= Rebaque =

1978–1979 Formula One team

(Mexico) Rebaque
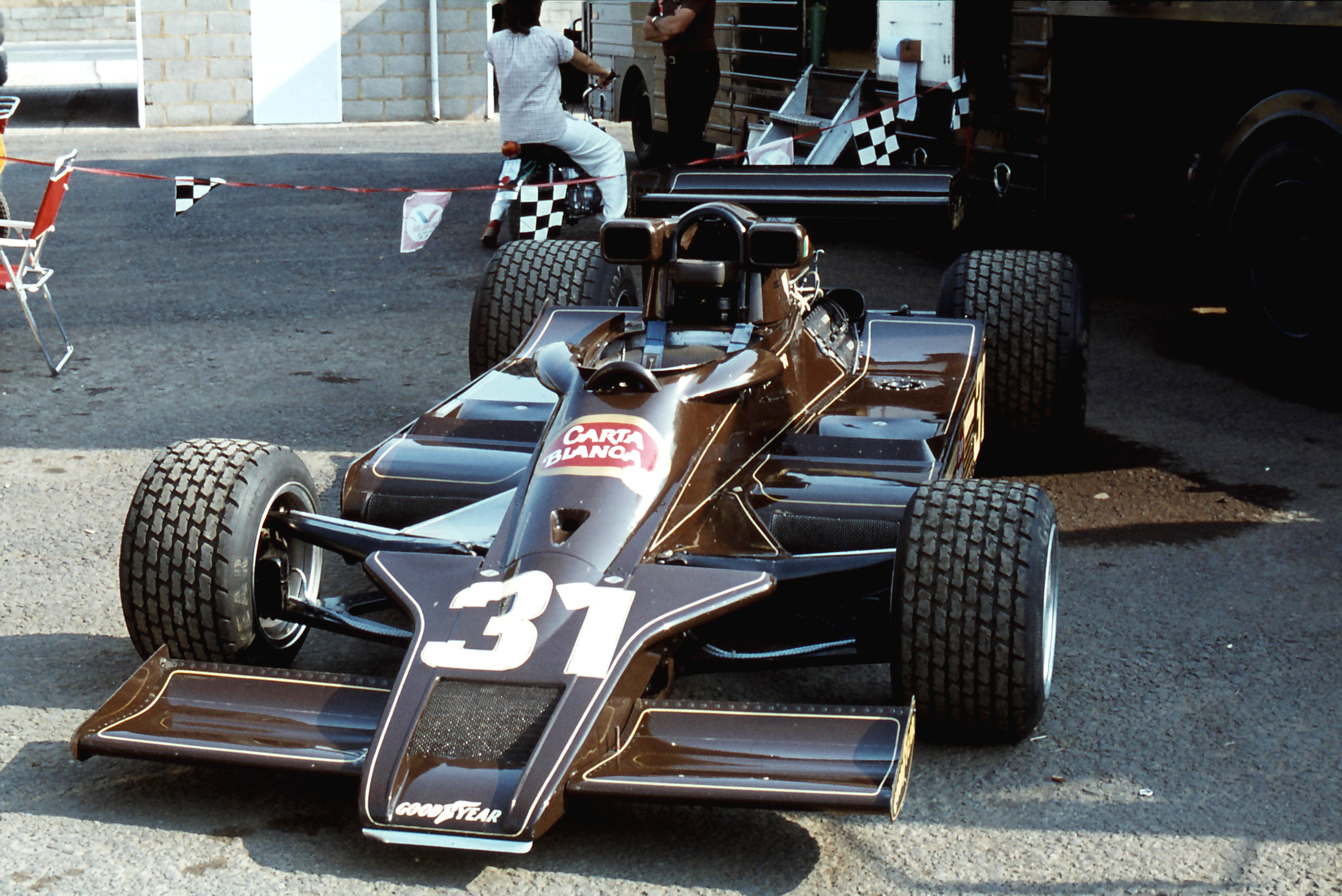
- Full name: Team Rebaque
- Base: Leamington Spa, UK
- Founder(s): Héctor Rebaque
- Noted staff: Peter Reinhardt; Geoff Ferris; Manuel "Chacho" Medina
- Noted drivers: (Mexico) Héctor Rebaque

Formula One World Championship career
- First entry: 1978 Argentine Grand Prix
- Races entered: 30 (19 starts)
- Engines: Ford Cosworth
- Constructors' Championships: 0
- Drivers' Championships: 0
- Race victories: 0 (best finish: 6th in the 1978 German Grand Prix)
- Pole positions: 0
- Fastest laps: 0
- Final entry: 1979 US Grand Prix

Team Rebaque was a Mexican Formula One entrant and constructor, based in Leamington Spa, UK. They participated in 30 Grands Prix, initially entering cars bought from Team Lotus, before finally building a car of their own. The Rebaque HR100 was entered for the team's final three races before the team's closure. The team qualified to race on 19 occasions, and achieved one World Constructors' Championship point with its best finish of sixth at the 1978 German Grand Prix. As of 2026, Rebaque is the most recent owner-driver in Formula 1.

== History ==
The team was founded by, and centred on, Héctor Rebaque, a Mexican driver who first drove in Formula One in 1977 for Hesketh. Following his debut season he was dropped by Hesketh, and with no other team willing to take him on as a driver Rebaque decided to start his own team. As of March 2026, this is the last time an owner-driver has been on the Formula 1 grid.

At the start of the 1978 Formula One season Rebaque agreed a deal with Team Lotus to buy their 1977 Type 78 model (JPS-15). He had very little experience, only having qualified for one race with Hesketh, and had a difficult year. Although he did score a point at the German Grand Prix, he also suffered the ignominy of being forced to retire from the Brazilian Grand Prix owing to driver fatigue.

== Rebaque HR100 ==
He continued the arrangement with Lotus for the 1979 season, this time buying the Championship winning Type 79 chassis. During the year he commissioned Penske to build a chassis, the Rebaque HR100. The design of the car - by Geoff Ferris with input from John Barnard - was heavily influenced by the design of the Lotus 79, also incorporating some elements of the Williams FW07's sidepods. It was completed in time for the Italian Grand Prix that year, although it either failed to qualify or to finish the final three races of the year. The team was closed down at the end of the year. Rebaque himself moved to the Brabham team midway through the following season.

== Complete Formula One results ==
(key) (results in bold indicate pole position; results in italics indicate fastest lap)

Year	Chassis	Engine	Tyres	Drivers	1	2	3	4	5	6	7	8	9	10	11	12	13	14	15	16	Points	WCC
1978	Lotus 78	Ford	**G**		ARG	BRA	RSA	USW	MON	BEL	ESP	SWE	FRA	GBR	GER	AUT	NED	ITA	USA	CAN	**1**	**n/a***
1978	Lotus 78	Ford	**G**	Héctor Rebaque	DNQ	Ret	10	DNPQ	DNPQ	DNPQ	Ret	12	DNQ	Ret	6	Ret	11	DNQ	Ret	DNQ	**1**	**n/a***
1979	Lotus 79	Ford	**G**		ARG	BRA	RSA	USW	ESP	BEL	MON	FRA	GBR	GER	AUT	NED	ITA	CAN	USA		**0**	n/a**
1979	Lotus 79	Ford	**G**	Héctor Rebaque	Ret	DNQ	Ret	Ret	Ret	Ret		12	9	Ret	DNQ	7					**0**	n/a**
1979	Rebaque HR100	Ford	**G**	Héctor Rebaque													DNQ	Ret	DNQ		**0**	**NC**

* Lotus-Ford finished 1st in the 1978 Constructors' Championship, scoring 86 points, but the 1 point scored by Team Rebaque did not contribute to the total (only the best result for each constructor at each race counted towards the championship)
** Lotus-Ford finished 4th in the 1979 Constructors' Championship, scoring 39 points, but Team Rebaque did not contribute to the points total
