= Lotus 78 =

Formula One racing car

Lotus 78 (John Player Special Mk. III)
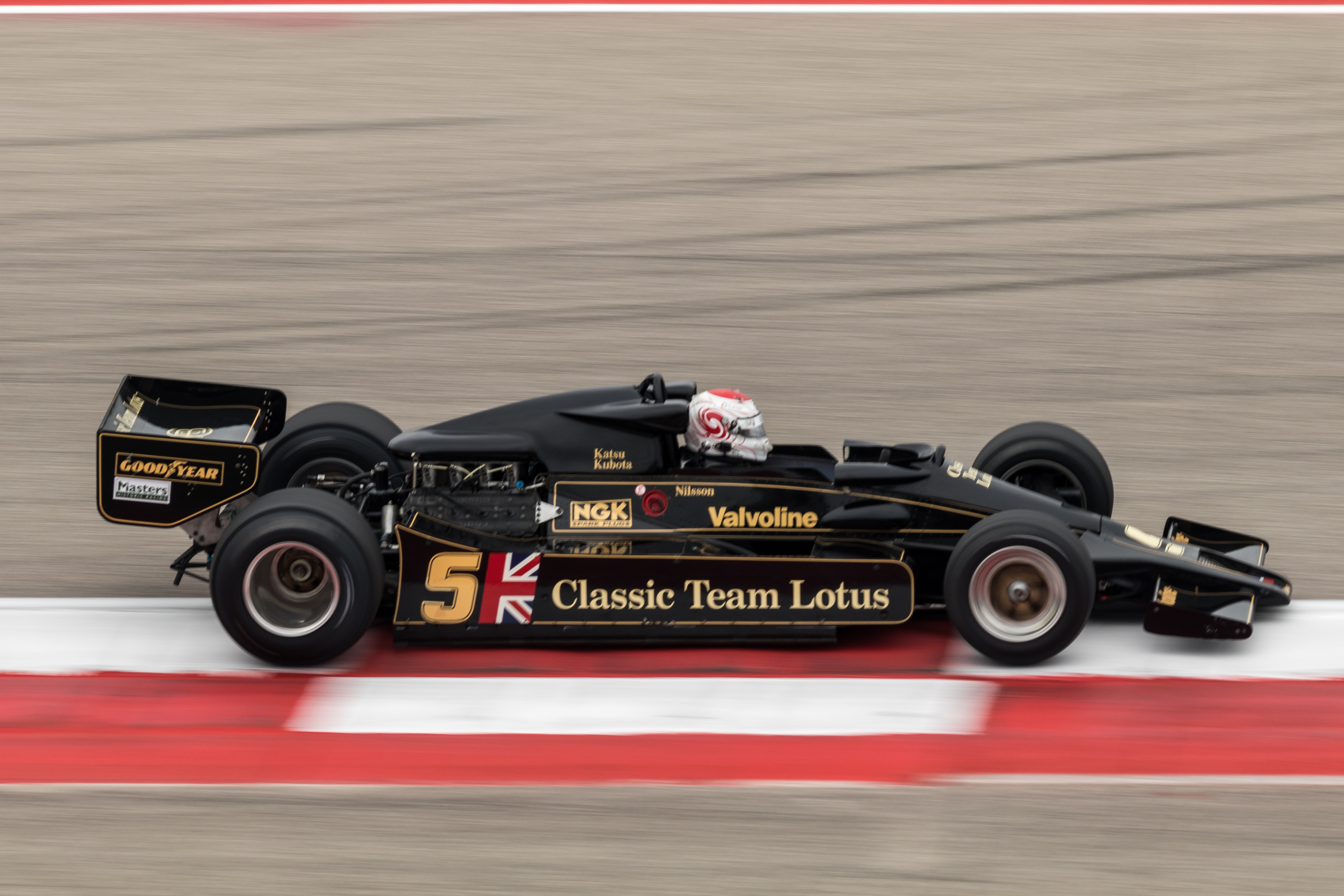
- The Lotus 78 during the 2017 FIA Masters Historic Formula One Championship at the Circuit of the Americas
- Category: Formula One
- Constructor: Team Lotus
- Designers: Colin Chapman (Executive Engineer); Tony Rudd (Head of Engineering); Ralph Bellamy (Chief Designer); Martin Ogilvie (Vehicle Engineer); Peter Wright (Aerodynamicist)
- Predecessor: Lotus 77
- Successor: Lotus 79

Technical specifications
- Chassis: Aluminium monocoque
- Suspension (front): Double wishbone, inboard spring/damper
- Suspension (rear): Parallel top links, lower wishbones, twin radius arms, outboard spring/damper
- Axle track: Front: 1,702 mm (67.0 in); Rear: 1,600 mm (63 in)
- Wheelbase: 2,741 mm (107.9 in)
- Engine: Ford-Cosworth DFV, 2,993 cc (182.6 cu in), V8, naturally aspirated, mid-engined, longitudinally mounted
- Transmission: Hewland FG400 5-speed manual
- Weight: 588 kg (1,296.3 lb)
- Fuel: Valvoline
- Tyres: Goodyear

Competition history
- Notable entrants: John Player Team Lotus, Rebaque
- Notable drivers: 5. (United States) Mario Andretti; 6. (Sweden) Gunnar Nilsson; 6. (Sweden) Ronnie Peterson; 31. (Mexico) Héctor Rebaque
- Debut: 1977 Argentine Grand Prix
- First win: 1977 United States Grand Prix West
- Last win: 1978 South African Grand Prix
- Last event: 1978 Italian Grand Prix (Lotus); 1978 Canadian Grand Prix (Team Rebaque)
Races	Wins	Podiums	Poles	F/Laps
33	7	11	9	7
- Constructors' Championships: 1 (1978)
- Drivers' Championships: 1 (Mario Andretti, 1978)

The Lotus 78 was a Formula One racing car used in the 1977 and 1978 seasons. It was designed by Peter Wright, Colin Chapman, Martin Ogilvie and Tony Rudd, and was the first ground effect car in Formula One.

== Concept ==
In early 1976, spurred on by a disappointing lack of pace of the ageing Lotus 72 the previous season and the indifferent performance of the current Lotus 77, Lotus’ founder and principal design engineer Colin Chapman wrote a 27-page document detailing some new ideas on low drag air penetration. Having studied the de Havilland Mosquito fighter bomber, he had paid close attention to its wing mounted radiators, and the hot air outlets that were designed to induce lift. Chapman realised that, inverted, such a system could give significant downforce. Careful examination of Bernoulli's principle of fluid dynamics confirmed his thoughts on the effects of an upturned aeroplane wing profile fitted to a car, and he finally handed the document to his head of engineering, Tony Rudd.

Rudd appointed a team to work on the project: chief designer Ralph Bellamy, vehicle engineer Martin Ogilvie and aerodynamicist Peter Wright. Rudd and Wright had previously worked for BRM, and before joining Lotus in 1970 had done a design study into the possibility of an inverted wing profile fitted to one of their cars. Rudd had tested a number of scale models, but lack of the right testing methods and BRM's declining fortunes meant development had never got beyond the experimental stage. However, Wright remembered their work and brought it into the project.

Wright then set about experimenting with F1 car body shapes using a wind tunnel and a rolling road, when by happy accident he began to get remarkable results in one of the models. Closer inspection found that as the rolling road's speed increased, the shaped underbody was being drawn closer to the surface of the road. Wright experimented with pieces of cardboard attached to the side of the model car body, and the level of perceived downforce produced was phenomenal. The results were presented to Colin Chapman, who gave the team free rein to come up with an F1 chassis design.

After a round of design sketches and engineering drawings and further work in the wind tunnel at Imperial College, the car was put into production. Five examples were built, codenamed John Player Special Mk. III, otherwise known as the Lotus 78 which appeared in July 1976. Mario Andretti wanted to introduce the car early, possibly at the Dutch Grand Prix that year but was overruled by Chapman, as he didn't want other teams discovering what Lotus had achieved.

The 78 was introduced at the first race of 1977, and proved to be the class car of the field that season, winning five races. The car proved relatively easy to set up and modify, with particular attention paid to the undercar aerodynamics and their interaction with the track surface, hence a stiffer suspension design which was required to maintain the aerodynamic effects.

== Development ==
The 78 was loosely based on the Lotus 72, sharing the same basic wedge shape and internal layout, but featuring detailed aerodynamic improvements, better weight distribution and a longer wheelbase. It had a slimmer, stronger monocoque made from aluminium sheet and honeycomb, which was developed from the 77. The bodywork was made up of fibreglass body panels with aluminium used to strengthen the chassis at points. The car created quite a stir when it first appeared, and outwardly seemed ahead of its time. Internally of course, it was a quantum leap ahead. Andretti worked hard with the car, testing for many thousands of miles at the Lotus test track in Hethel.

Based on Bernoulli's discoveries, the underside of the sidepods were shaped as inverted aerofoils, in the same vein as conventional wings but on a much larger scale. Wright and Chapman had discovered that by shaping the floor of the car in this way, they could accelerate the air passing through the gap between the ground and the underside, thereby reducing the air pressure under the car relative to that over it. This created significant underpressure, effectively sucking the vehicle down and forcing the tyres harder onto the track.

Copying the Mosquito's radiator design, the radiators were positioned so that the hot air escaping would pass over the upper bodywork of the car, creating even more downforce. To make the suction effect as great as possible, the monocoque was slimmer, forcing the air passing through between the ground and the inverted wing shape cover as much as possible.

The greater force downwards on the tyres gave more grip and thus higher cornering speeds. This ground effect had the great advantage of being a low drag solution unlike conventional wings, meaning that the increased cornering ability was not compromised by a decrease in straight-line speed. If anything, because of the decreased air resistance, the top speed of the car also increased accordingly.

To begin with, brushes were fitted to the base of each sidepod to keep the low pressure area under the car. When these proved insufficient, Lotus tried plastic skirts, but these abraded very quickly, until finally moveable rubber skirts were developed which proved very effective. The sliding skirts sealed the gap between the sides of the cars and the ground and prevented excessive air being sucked into the low pressure area under the car and dissipating the ground effect. Andretti described driving the 78 as if it were 'painted to the road'.

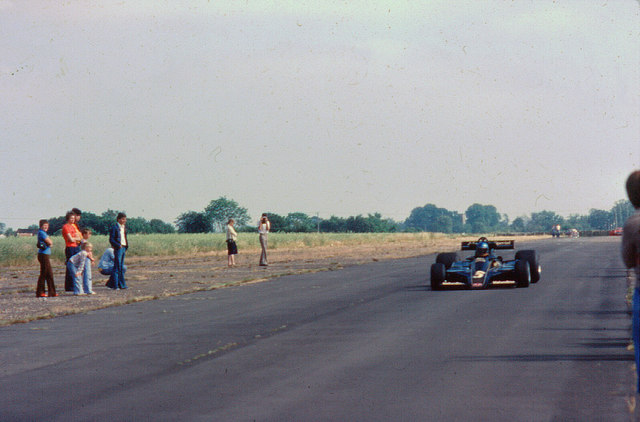
The Lotus 78 being tested at the Lotus test track in Hethel

The fuel tanks were three separate cells, with one behind the driver and one each in the midsection of each sidepod. The sidepod tanks could be controlled from the cockpit by the driver and could be used to fuel the engine separately or together, improving performance and weight bias in cornering. The suspension set up from the previous Lotus 77 was used, with the suspension designed for quick changes in geometry. This helped set the car up for a specific circuit when required.

Unfortunately after first tests were done, the low pressure area under the car was found to be too far forward, requiring a very large rear wing to be designed resulting in a lot of drag at high speeds. This was especially noticeable on fast tracks such as Hockenheim and the Österreichring, where the Ferraris and McLarens were much faster than the 78. To compensate, Ford provided development versions of the Ford Cosworth DFV, increasing the car's speed but also sacrificing reliability. Andretti had no fewer than five engine failures in 1977, costing him the world championship to Niki Lauda, even though he had won four races and taken six pole positions to Lauda's three wins and two pole positions. Eventually a smaller wing was designed in time for the Italian Grand Prix (see above picture), which cut the drag factor significantly, and allowed Andretti to take a popular 'home' victory.

Another problem was with the rear suspension, which although slightly modified to allow clearer airflow from the rear of the sidepods, was still directly in the path of the exiting air, which affected the stability of the back of the car, causing oversteer.

== Racing history ==
=== 1977 ===
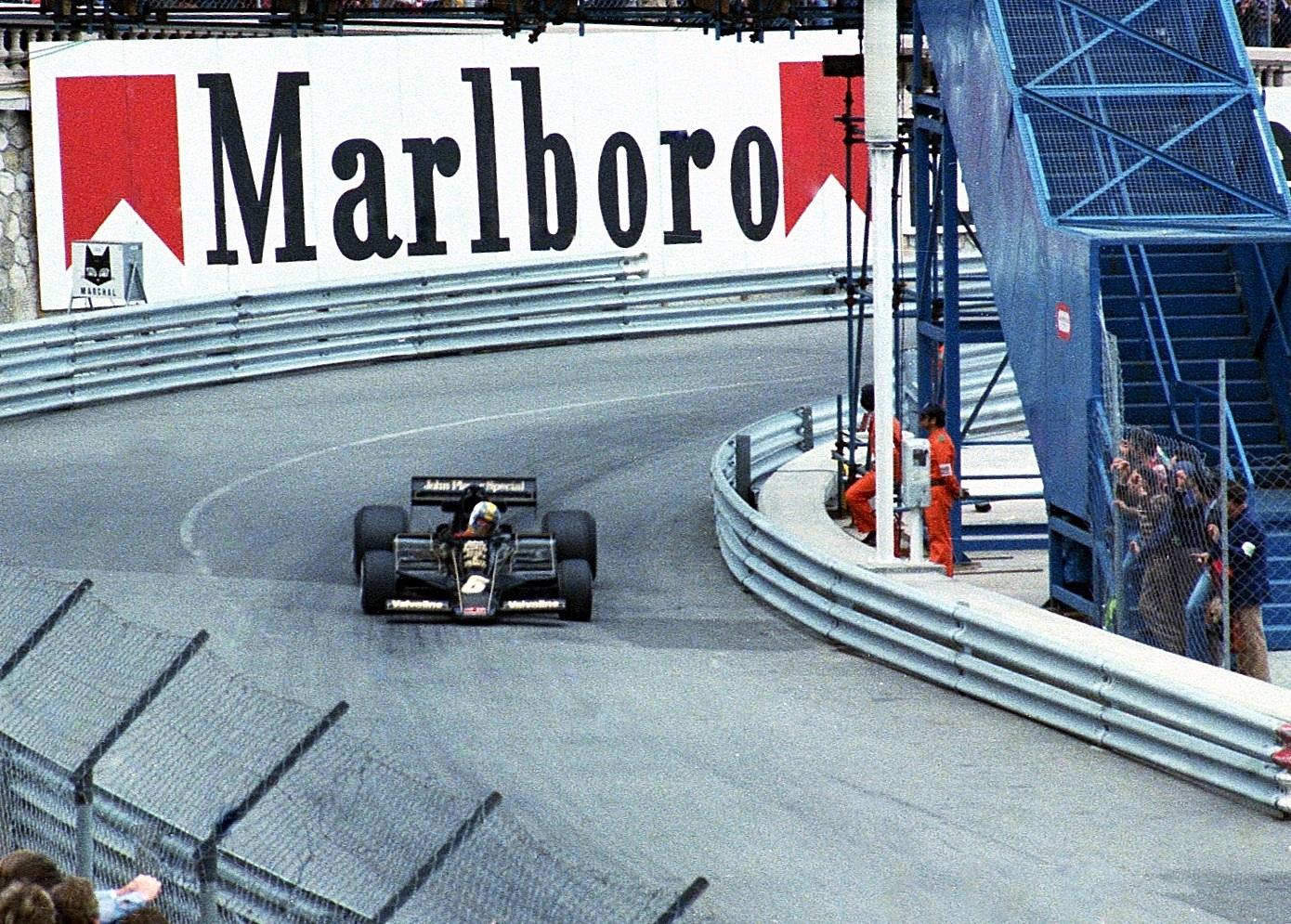
Gunnar Nilsson driving the 78 at the 1977 Monaco Grand Prix

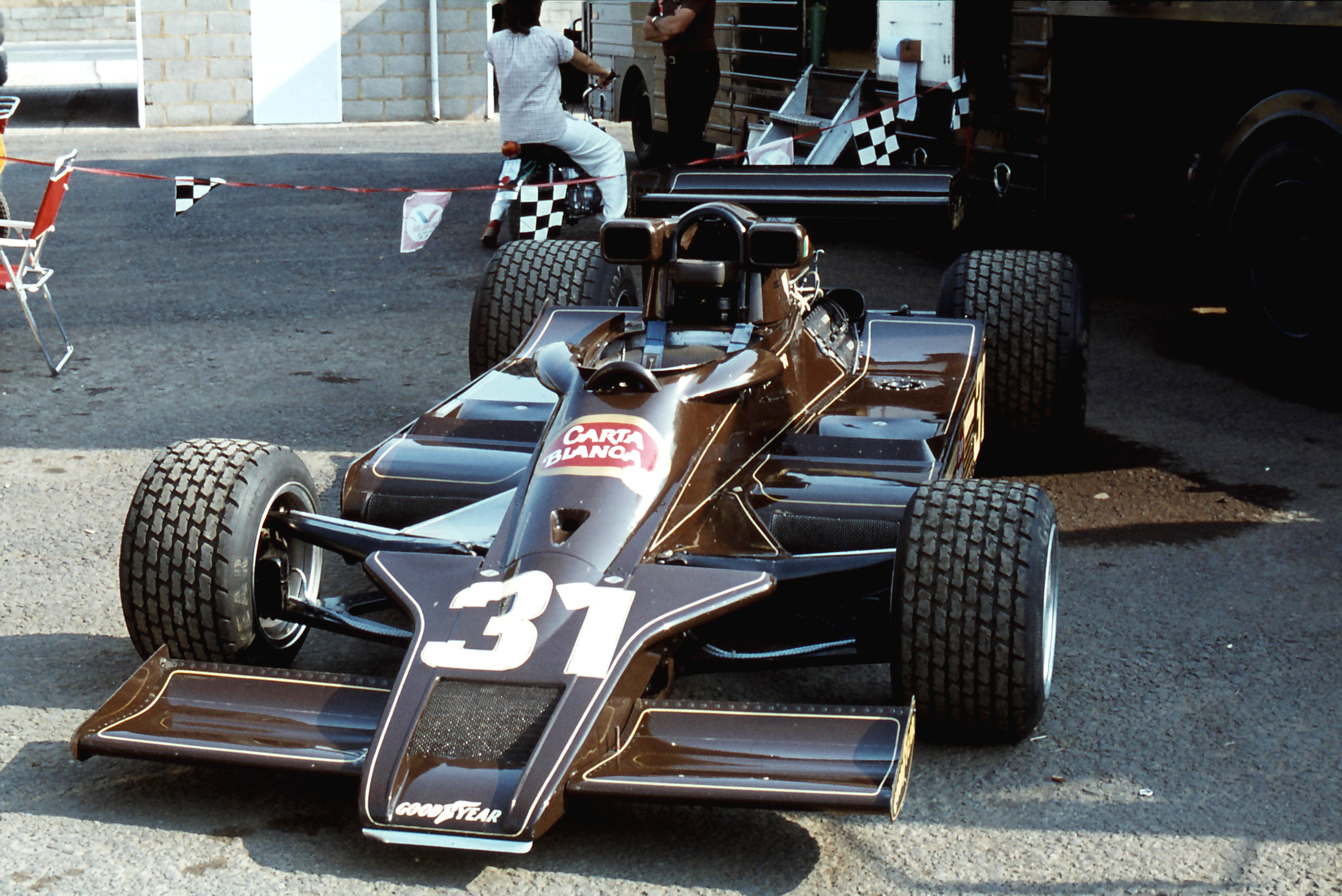
Héctor Rebaque's Lotus 78 at the 1979 British Grand Prix, where it was used as a spare car

It was obvious that the Lotus 78 had some special feature, as proved by Andretti and Gunnar Nilsson winning the race in Belgium: When the car worked well, it was almost uncatchable. Other teams started scrambling to somehow replicate whatever it was in their own car designs for 1978. The problem they had was that they didn't really know what was so special about the car, as Chapman and other members of the Lotus team came up with any number of explanations of the car's performance to obfuscate the real reason, and the side skirts on the car hid the underside of the car from view.

=== 1978 ===
The 78 was good enough to still be a winner in early 1978, with Andretti and Ronnie Peterson scoring a win each and another three pole positions before it was replaced by the Lotus 79, which was as far ahead of the 78 as the 78 had been ahead of the rest of the field in 1977.

The 78 was to see one further works team start, however. Owing to damage sustained to his 79 in practice, Ronnie Peterson was forced to use the reserve car, 78/3 (JPS-17), to qualify for the 1978 Italian Grand Prix. The car had not been maintained or developed by the team as they concentrated on the 79, and the car was hurriedly prepared for the race. Although his teammate Andretti predictably took pole position, the slower 78 was only good enough for fifth place on the grid for Peterson. The Swede was caught up in a massive start line accident, which resulted in his car ramming the barriers nose-first, completely destroying the front end of the vehicle. Peterson later died owing to complications arising from the treatment he received following the crash.

The original development prototype, 78/1 (JPS-15), was sold to Héctor Rebaque. He ran this car through his Rebaque privateer team in World Championship events during 1978 and 1979, and in non-Championship races into the early 1980s.

In all, the Lotus 78 took seven wins, nine pole positions and scored 106 points in its career.

== Formula One results ==
(key) (results in bold indicate pole position; results in italics indicate fastest lap)

Year	Entrant	Engine	Tyres	Drivers	1	2	3	4	5	6	7	8	9	10	11	12	13	14	15	16	17	Points	WCC
1977	John Player Team Lotus	Ford Cosworth DFV V8	G		ARG	BRA	RSA	USW	ESP	MON	BEL	SWE	FRA	GBR	GER	AUT	NED	ITA	USA	CAN	JPN	62	**2nd**
1977	John Player Team Lotus	Ford Cosworth DFV V8	G	Mario Andretti	5	Ret	Ret	1	**1**	5	**Ret**	**6**	**1**	14	Ret	Ret	**Ret**	1	2	**9**	**Ret**	62	**2nd**
1977	John Player Team Lotus	Ford Cosworth DFV V8	G	Gunnar Nilsson	DNS	5	12	8	5	Ret	1	19	4	3	Ret	Ret	Ret	Ret	Ret	Ret	Ret	62	**2nd**
1978	John Player Team Lotus	Ford Cosworth DFV V8	G		ARG	BRA	RSA	USW	MON	BEL	ESP	SWE	FRA	GBR	GER	AUT	NED	ITA	USA	CAN		86	**1st**^{1}
1978	John Player Team Lotus	Ford Cosworth DFV V8	G	Mario Andretti	**1**	4	7	2	11													86	**1st**^{1}
1978	John Player Team Lotus	Ford Cosworth DFV V8	G	Ronnie Peterson	5	**Ret**	1	4	Ret	2								Ret				86	**1st**^{1}
1978	Team Rebaque	Ford Cosworth DFV V8	G	Héctor Rebaque	DNQ	Ret	10	DNPQ	DNPQ	DNPQ	Ret	12	DNQ	Ret	6	Ret	11	DNQ	Ret	DNQ		86	**1st**^{1}

^1 This total includes points scored by the Lotus 79 used by Team Lotus for the remainder of the season.

== Bibliography ==
- Tipler, John (2003). Lotus 78 and 79: The Ground Effect Cars. Crowood Press. p. 192. ISBN 978-1-86126-586-9.
- Mario Andretti: World Champion by Mario Andretti and Nigel Roebuck
- Autosport 60th Anniversary issue, 2010
- Nye, Doug (1986). Autocourse history of the Grand Prix car 1966–85. Hazleton publishing. ISBN 0-905138-37-6.
