= 1979 United States Grand Prix =

- Race 15 of 15 in the 1979 Formula One season
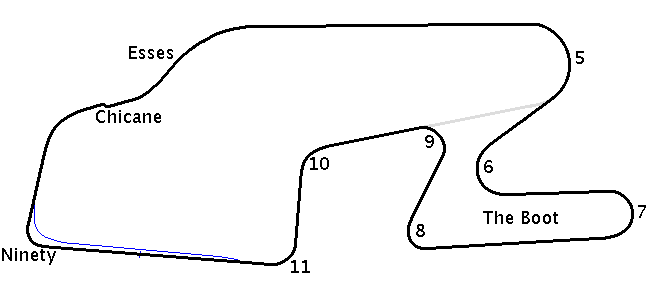

Race details
- Date: October 7, 1979
- Official name: XXII Toyota United States Grand Prix
- Location: Watkins Glen Grand Prix Race Course; Watkins Glen, New York
- Course: Permanent road course
- Course length: 5.435 km (3.377 miles)
- Distance: 59 laps, 320.67 km (199.24 miles)
- Weather: Rain with temperatures reaching a maximum of 15 °C (59 °F); Wind speeds up to 27.78 km/h (17.26 mph)

Pole position
Driver	(Australia) Alan Jones	Williams-Ford
- Time: 1:35.615

Fastest lap
Driver	(Brazil) Nelson Piquet	Brabham-Ford
- Time: 1:40.054 on lap 51

Podium
First	(Canada) Gilles Villeneuve	Ferrari
Second	(France) René Arnoux	Renault
Third	(France) Didier Pironi	Tyrrell-Ford

The 1979 United States Grand Prix was a Formula One motor race held on October 7, 1979 at the Watkins Glen Grand Prix Race Course in Watkins Glen, New York. It was the fifteenth and final race of the 1979 World Championship of F1 Drivers and the 1979 International Cup for F1 Constructors. This event was also referred to as the United States Grand Prix East in order to distinguish it from the United States Grand Prix West held on April 8, 1979 in Long Beach, California.

The 59-lap race took place in wet conditions, and was won by Gilles Villeneuve, driving a Ferrari. René Arnoux finished second in a Renault, with Didier Pironi third in a Tyrrell-Ford. The win, Villeneuve's third of the season, enabled him to secure second place in the Drivers' Championship behind team-mate Jody Scheckter.

This was the final Formula One race for the 1969 and 1970 championship runner-up Jacky Ickx, Alex Ribeiro, Arturo Merzario and former Brabham driver Hans-Joachim Stuck, as well as the final race for the Wolf team. Villeneuve's win was also to be the final one for a car with a flat-12 engine and the three points scored by Elio de Angelis would be the last points scored by the Shadow team.

Prior to his joining the team in 1980, then unknown young French driver Alain Prost was offered the chance to race with McLaren at Watkins Glen. However, Prost turned the drive down believing he was not yet physically or mentally ready for his F1 debut and that he would do neither the team or himself justice by racing.

== Summary ==
By the time the teams got to Watkins Glen for the last race of the 1979 season, Jody Scheckter had already clinched the Drivers' Championship, while his Ferrari team had secured the Constructors' Championship.

On Friday, the rain was heavy enough all day that only a few cars made any serious attempt at a lap time. Of the six that did actually record a time, Gilles Villeneuve was fastest by over nine seconds.

Saturday started bright and sunny, and Alan Jones topped the charts in his Williams for the entire session. He ended up 1.3 seconds quicker than the Brabham of Brazilian Nelson Piquet, who gained the front row in his first drive at Watkins Glen. Scheckter had trouble with the engine in his race car and traffic with his spare, and ended up 16th, one spot ahead of the previous season's champion, Mario Andretti.

The forecast for Sunday was a 50% chance of rain. About twenty minutes before the start, the rain came, and all but two of the cars started with rain tires. The two that did not were Piquet and Andretti, who, in 17th spot on the grid, had nothing to lose by the gamble.

At the start, Piquet suffered with wheelspin on his slicks and was left behind. Scheckter took an outside line through turn one, but he got pushed onto the grass and had to wait for the entire field to go by before re-entering. Keke Rosberg spun and recovered, but he forced Bruno Giacomelli off behind him and into retirement with a bent steering arm. After one lap, the order was Villeneuve, Jones, Carlos Reutemann, Jacques Laffite, Jean-Pierre Jabouille, Clay Regazzoni, René Arnoux, Didier Pironi, John Watson and Jean-Pierre Jarier. After two laps, Villeneuve had extended his lead to five seconds.

By lap three, Jacky Ickx, in his last Grand Prix, had moved his Ligier from 24th to twelfth. As he closed on Derek Daly's Tyrrell approaching the turn before the pit entrance, however, he bumped Daly from behind and went off. His teammate, Jacques Laffite, running in fifth place, spun off on the next lap at the same place. Reutemann crashed out on lap seven from third place when his fire extinguisher sensing unit came loose and interfered with his pedals. The other Lotus, driven by Andretti, decided his gamble to start on slicks had not worked and pitted for wets, since it was still raining. He returned in 20th, but retired soon after when his gearbox became permanently lodged in fourth.

The gap between Villeneuve and Jones varied, with Regazzoni quite a bit back in third. When the rain became heavier, the Ferrari's Michelins performed better; when it slacked off, the intermediate surface favored the Goodyears on the Williams. On lap 20, Scheckter, now in third after fighting his way back from last place, pitted for slicks, as did Regazzoni. Scheckter later said that it was still too early, as he began sliding around down the straight, but the lap time comparison with Villeneuve helped the Ferrari crew to decide when to bring Villeneuve in.

On lap 21, Rosberg caught up with Pironi and tried to overtake on the inside. He could not hold his line, and when he slid wide, he took the Tyrrell with him. Pironi was able to continue, but Rosberg retired with a damaged gearbox. Beginning on lap 25, most of the cars came in for slicks, except the three leaders, Villeneuve, Jones and Arnoux. As the circuit continued to dry, Jones cut into Villeneuve's lead, taking off two seconds per lap. By lap 31, Jones was on his tail, and then quickly past. In two laps, he was 3.1 seconds clear. Villeneuve came in to change tires on lap 34, and returned 39.5 seconds behind Jones.

The Williams crew prepared to fit Jones' car with slicks as he came in on lap 37. After some difficulty removing the right rear, the racing manager waved the jacks away and the car out. As the mechanic on the right rear shouted and waved that he was not finished, the car sped from the pits. At the beginning of the back straight, the wheel came off and Jones retired.

Villeneuve now led Scheckter by almost a lap. Arnoux lost two positions, to fifth, when he pitted for tires, but regained third place, ahead of Daly and Pironi, in two laps. On lap 48, Scheckter felt his car floating about and thought he had a puncture. He decided to go one more lap, but never made it back. The tire shredded and he retired, leaving only nine cars still running. Daly spun off from fourth, and Piquet, after setting fastest lap of the race in pursuit of John Watson's McLaren, dropped out with a broken driveshaft five laps from the flag.

Villeneuve coasted home, allowing Elio de Angelis and Hans-Joachim Stuck to unlap themselves, but finishing with a 48-second margin over Arnoux. Later, Villeneuve revealed that he had been nursing the car with failing oil pressure for the final 25 laps. The American Shadow team celebrated de Angelis' fourth place, his only points of the year. The win by Villeneuve was his third, matching champion Scheckter's total, securing a one-two finish in the Drivers' Championship.

== Classification ==
=== Qualifying ===
Pos.	Driver	Constructor	Time
1	(Australia) Alan Jones	Williams–Ford	1:35.615
2	(Brazil) Nelson Piquet	Brabham–Ford	+1.299
3	(Canada) Gilles Villeneuve	Ferrari	+1.333
4	(France) Jacques Laffite	Ligier–Ford	+1.451
5	(Switzerland) Clay Regazzoni	Williams–Ford	+1.513
6	(Argentina) Carlos Reutemann	Lotus–Ford	+2.257
7	(France) René Arnoux	Renault	+2.580
8	(France) Jean-Pierre Jabouille	Renault	+2.603
9	(Argentina) Ricardo Zunino	Brabham–Ford	+2.894
10	(France) Didier Pironi	Tyrrell–Ford	+3.208
11	(France) Jean-Pierre Jarier	Tyrrell–Ford	+3.330
12	(Finland) Keke Rosberg	Wolf–Ford	+3.420
13	(United Kingdom) John Watson	McLaren–Ford	+3.618
14	(West Germany) Hans-Joachim Stuck	ATS–Ford	+3.714
15	(Republic of Ireland) Derek Daly	Tyrrell–Ford	+3.853
16	(South Africa) Jody Scheckter	Ferrari	+3.961
17	(United States) Mario Andretti	Lotus–Ford	+4.529
18	(Italy) Bruno Giacomelli	Alfa Romeo	+4.662
19	(Italy) Riccardo Patrese	Arrows–Ford	+4.722
20	(Italy) Elio de Angelis	Shadow–Ford	+5.010
21	(Switzerland) Marc Surer	Ensign–Ford	+5.020
22	(France) Patrick Tambay	McLaren–Ford	+5.116
23	(Brazil) Emerson Fittipaldi	Fittipaldi–Ford	+5.126
24	(Belgium) Jacky Ickx	Ligier–Ford	+5.139
Cut-off
25	(Italy) Vittorio Brambilla	Alfa Romeo	+5.174
26	(West Germany) Jochen Mass	Arrows–Ford	+5.209
27	(Netherlands) Jan Lammers	Shadow–Ford	+6.473
28	(Mexico) Héctor Rebaque	Rebaque–Ford	+7.445
29	(Brazil) Alex Ribeiro	Fittipaldi–Ford	+9.568
30	(Italy) Arturo Merzario	Merzario–Ford	+13.703

=== Race ===
Pos	No	Driver	Constructor	Tyre	Laps	Time/Retired	Grid	Points
1	12	(Canada) Gilles Villeneuve	Ferrari	MI	59	1:52:17.734	3	9
2	16	(France) René Arnoux	Renault	MI	59	+ 48.787	7	6
3	3	(France) Didier Pironi	Tyrrell-Ford	G	59	+ 53.199	10	4
4	18	(Italy) Elio de Angelis	Shadow-Ford	G	59	+ 1:30.512	20	3
5	9	(West Germany) Hans-Joachim Stuck	ATS-Ford	G	59	+ 1:41.259	14	2
6	7	(United Kingdom) John Watson	McLaren-Ford	G	58	+ 1 Lap	13	1
7	14	(Brazil) Emerson Fittipaldi	Fittipaldi-Ford	G	54	+ 5 Laps	23	
Ret	6	(Brazil) Nelson Piquet	Brabham-Ford	G	53	Transmission	2	
Ret	33	(Republic of Ireland) Derek Daly	Tyrrell-Ford	G	52	Spun Off	15	
Ret	11	(South Africa) Jody Scheckter	Ferrari	MI	48	Tyre	16	
Ret	29	(Italy) Riccardo Patrese	Arrows-Ford	G	44	Suspension	19	
Ret	27	(Australia) Alan Jones	Williams-Ford	G	36	Wheel	1	
Ret	22	(Switzerland) Marc Surer	Ensign-Ford	G	32	Engine	21	
Ret	28	(Switzerland) Clay Regazzoni	Williams-Ford	G	29	Accident	5	
Ret	5	(Argentina) Ricardo Zunino	Brabham-Ford	G	25	Spun Off	9	
Ret	15	(France) Jean-Pierre Jabouille	Renault	MI	24	Engine	8	
Ret	20	(Finland) Keke Rosberg	Wolf-Ford	G	20	Accident	12	
Ret	8	(France) Patrick Tambay	McLaren-Ford	G	20	Engine	22	
Ret	4	(France) Jean-Pierre Jarier	Tyrrell-Ford	G	18	Accident	11	
Ret	1	(United States) Mario Andretti	Lotus-Ford	G	16	Gearbox	17	
Ret	2	(Argentina) Carlos Reutemann	Lotus-Ford	G	6	Spun Off	6	
Ret	26	(France) Jacques Laffite	Ligier-Ford	G	3	Spun Off	4	
Ret	25	(Belgium) Jacky Ickx	Ligier-Ford	G	2	Spun Off	24	
Ret	35	(Italy) Bruno Giacomelli	Alfa Romeo	G	0	Spun Off	18	
DNQ	36	(Italy) Vittorio Brambilla	Alfa Romeo	G				
DNQ	30	(West Germany) Jochen Mass	Arrows-Ford	G				
DNQ	17	(Netherlands) Jan Lammers	Shadow-Ford	G				
DNQ	31	(Mexico) Héctor Rebaque	Rebaque-Ford	G				
DNQ	19	(Brazil) Alex Ribeiro	Fittipaldi-Ford	G				
DNQ	24	(Italy) Arturo Merzario	Merzario-Ford	G				

== Final championship standings ==
Drivers' Championship standings

Pos	Driver	Points
1	(South Africa) **Jody Scheckter**	51 (60)
2	(Canada) Gilles Villeneuve	47 (53)
3	(Australia) Alan Jones	40 (43)
4	(France) Jacques Laffite	36
5	(Switzerland) Clay Regazzoni	29 (32)

Constructors' Championship standings

Pos	Constructor	Points
1	(Italy) **Ferrari**	113
2	(United Kingdom) Williams-Ford	75
3	(France) Ligier-Ford	61
4	(United Kingdom) Lotus-Ford	39
5	(United Kingdom) Tyrrell-Ford	28

- Note: Only the top five positions are included for both sets of standings. Only the best 4 results from the first 7 races and the best 4 results from the last 8 races counted towards the Drivers' Championship. Numbers without parentheses are Championship points; numbers in parentheses are total points scored.
- **Bold text** indicates the 1979 World Champions.

Previous race: 1979 Canadian Grand Prix	FIA Formula One World Championship; 1979 season	Next race: 1980 Argentine Grand Prix
Previous race: 1978 United States Grand Prix	United States Grand Prix	Next race: 1980 United States Grand Prix
