= Héctor Rebaque =

Mexican racing driver (born 1956)

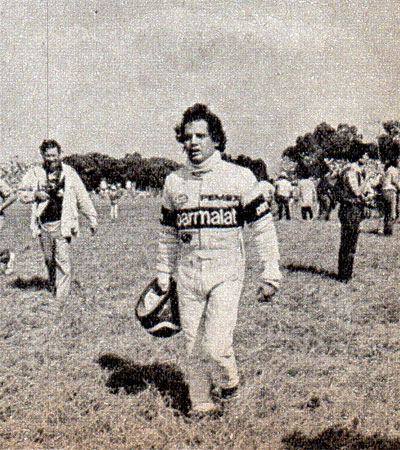
- Rebaque at the 1981 Argentine Grand Prix
- Born: Héctor Alonso Rebaque; 5 February 1956 (age 70); Mexico City, Mexico

Formula One World Championship career
- Nationality: (Mexico) Mexican
- Active years: 1977–1981
- Team(s): Hesketh, Rebaque, Brabham
- Entries: 58 (41 starts)
- Championships: 0
- Wins: 0
- Podiums: 0
- Career points: 13
- Pole positions: 0
- Fastest laps: 0
- First entry: 1977 Belgian Grand Prix
- Last entry: 1981 Caesars Palace Grand Prix

Champ Car career
- 6 races run over 1 year
- Years active: 1982
- Team: Forsythe
- Best finish: 15th (1982)
- First race: 1982 Stroh's 200 (Atlanta)
- Last race: 1982 Road America 200 (Road America)
- First win: 1982 Road America 200 (Road America)
Wins	Podiums	Poles
1	1	0

Héctor Alonso Rebaque (born 5 February 1956) is a Mexican former racing driver and businessman, who competed in Formula One from 1977 to 1981.

Born and raised in Mexico City, Rebaque participated in 58 Formula One Grands Prix. He founded Rebaque in 1978, entering a privateer Lotus 78 before constructing the Rebaque HR100 in collaboration with Penske, which he entered the final three Grands Prix of 1979 with. Rebaque also competed in Formula One for Hesketh and Brabham.

Rebaque transitioned to CART for 1982, winning the Road America 200 in his rookie season; he retired from oval racing following a testing incident at Michigan International Speedway one week later. Rebaque returned to Europe for the non-championship 1983 Race of Champions with Brabham, before retiring from motor racing aged 27. Since his retirement, Rebaque has moved into business, operating several architectural firms across Mexico.

== Early life ==
Rebaque was born on 5 February 1956 in Mexico City, Mexico.

== Racing career ==
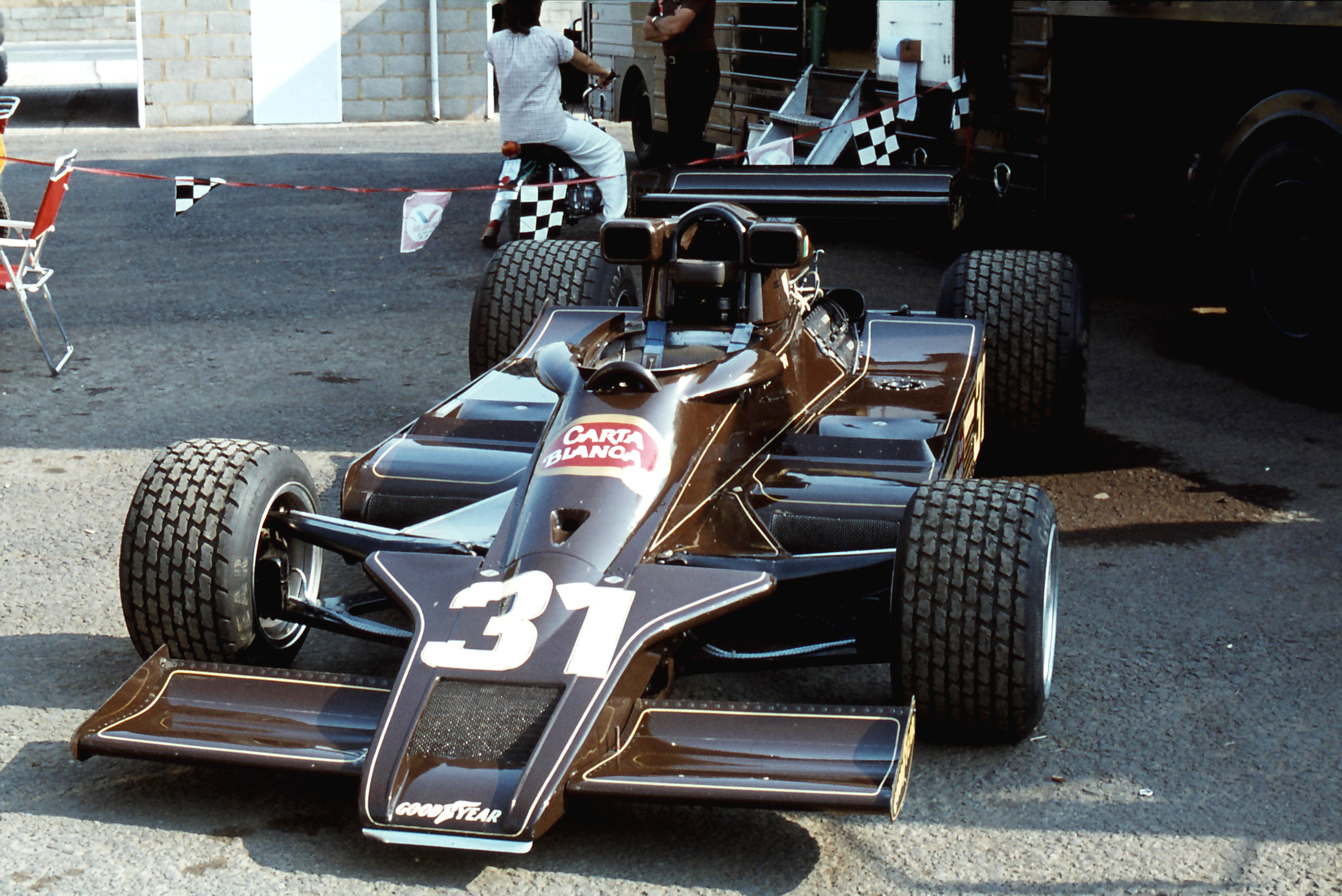
Rebaque's Lotus 78 at the 1979 British GP

Rebaque participated in 58 Formula One World Championship Grands Prix, debuting on 1977 Belgian Grand Prix, the first participation of a Mexican driver in the category since the death of Pedro Rodríguez in a Interserie's race in Norisring in 1971. He scored a total of 13 championship points. He also ran his own Formula One team, Rebaque, in 1978 and 1979; usually he raced Lotuses but for the last three races in 1979, he fielded his own car designed by Penske which he called the HR100.

In the middle of 1980, Rebaque substituted for Ricardo Zunino as team mate to Nelson Piquet at Brabham, where he stayed throughout the 1981 season achieving his best Formula One results, finishing 10th in the Championship.

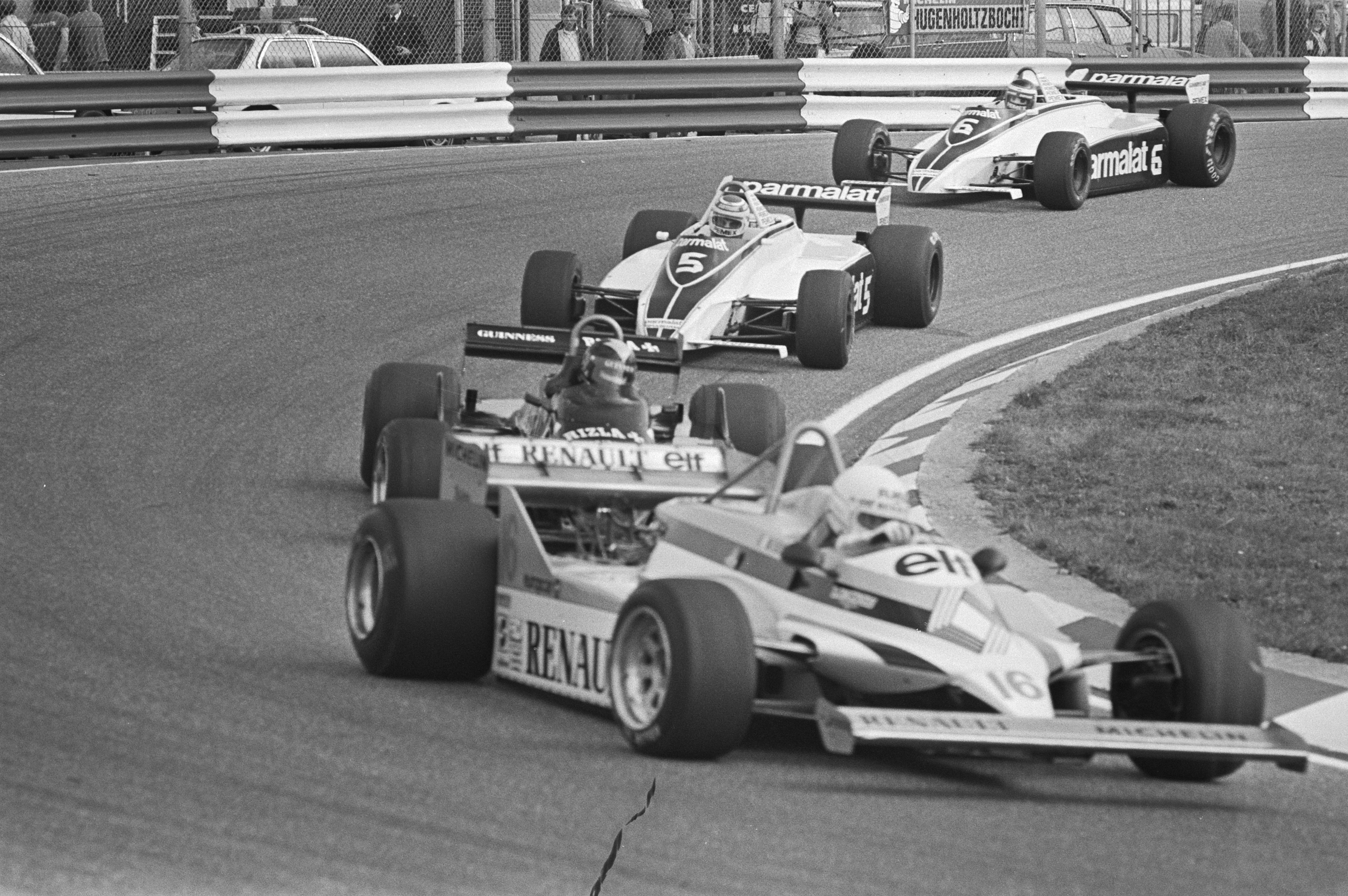
Rebaque No. 6 at the 1981 Dutch GP

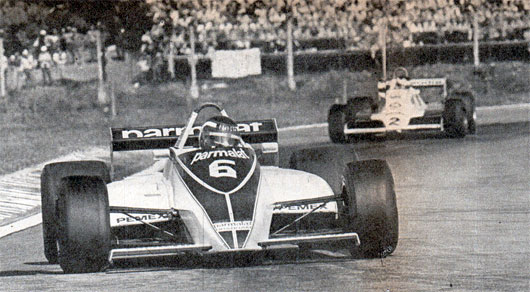
Rebaque at the 1981 Argentine GP

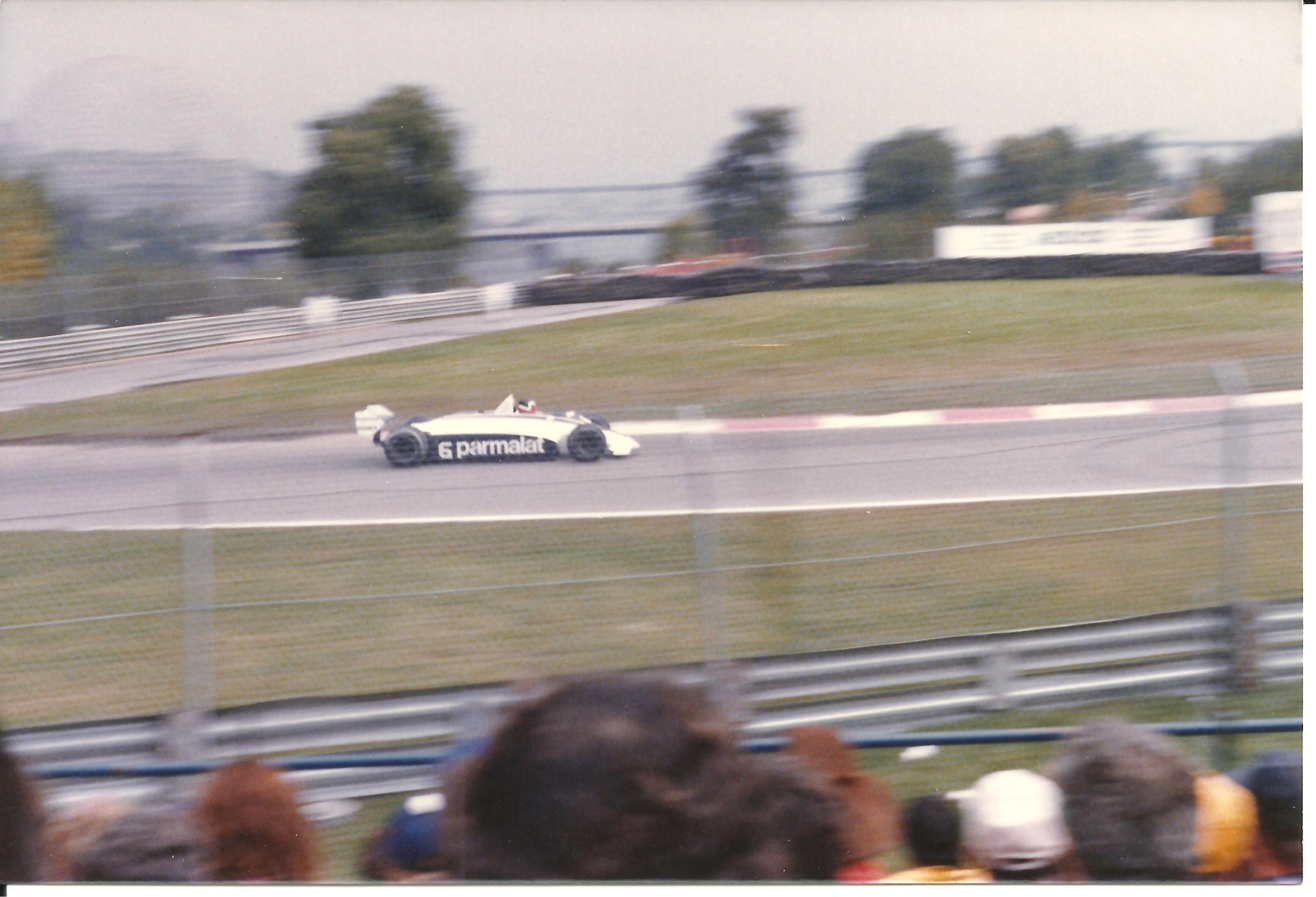
Rebaque at the 1981 Canadian Grand Prix

Rebaque also drove in the 1982 CART IndyCar season for Forsythe Racing including the 1982 Indianapolis 500 where he finished 13th after a pit fire on lap 151. He won his final CART race, which was the first one held at Road America. However, he was injured a week later in a testing crash at Michigan International Speedway. From there, he decided to return to road racing as he felt oval racing was too dangerous.

Rebaque's final race was the 1983 Race of Champions, a Formula One non-points race at Brands Hatch.

== Helmet ==
Rebaque's helmet was black with a green, white and red design surrounding the visor area. The colours used are the colours of the Mexican flag.

== Business ==
After his retirement from racing track, Rebaque now works in architecture related businesses in Mexico.

== Racing record ==
=== Career summary ===
Season	Series	Team	Races	Wins	Poles	F/Laps	Podiums	Points	Position
1973	World Sportscar Championship	John Buffum	1	0	0	0	0	N/A	NC
1974	John Player British Formula Atlantic		6	0	0	0	0	3	27th
1974	MCD/Southern Organs British Formula Atlantic	Fred Opert Racing	2	0	0	0	0	3	14th
1974	World Sportscar Championship	Ecurie Ecosse	1	0	0	0	0	0	NC
1974	World Sportscar Championship	Rebaque-Rojas Racing Team	1	0	0	0	0	0	NC
1974	24 Hours of Le Mans	Rebaque-Rojas Racing Team	1	0	0	0	0	N/A	DNF
1974	IMSA GT Championship	Héctor Rebaque Sr.	1	1	0	?	1	N/A	DNF
1975	Formula Atlantic	Fred Opert Racing	5	0	0	0	0	16	16th
1975	European Formula Two	Fred Opert Racing	5	0	0	0	0	3	22nd
1975	24 Hours of Daytona	Héctor Rebaque Sr.	1	0	0	0	0	N/A	9th
1976	CASC Formula Atlantic	Carl Haas Racing	5	0	0	0	0	27	14th
1976	IMSA Formula Atlantic	Fred Opert Racing	3	0	0	0	0	16	9th
1977	Formula One	Hesketh Racing	1	0	0	0	0	0	NC
1978	Formula One	Rebaque	9	0	0	0	0	1	19th
1979	Formula One	Rebaque	10	0	0	0	0	0	NC
1980	Formula One	Parmalat Racing	7	0	0	0	0	1	20th
1981	Formula One	Parmalat Racing	14	0	0	0	0	11	10th
1981–82	USAC Championship Car	Carta Blanca	1	0	0	0	0	25	33rd
1982	CART PPG Indy Car World Series	Forsythe Racing	5	1	0	0	1	48	15th

=== Complete 24 Hours of Le Mans Results ===
Year	Team	Co-Drivers	Car	Class	Laps	Pos.	Class Pos.
1974	(Mexico) Rebaque-Rojas Racing Team	(Mexico) Memo Rojas, Sr. (Mexico) Freddy Van Beuren	Porsche 911 Carrera	S 3.0	60	DNF	DNF

=== Complete 1000 km of Mexico City ===
Year	Team	Co-Drivers	Car	Class	Laps	Pos.	Class Pos.
1974	(Mexico) Rebaque-Rojas Racing Team	(Mexico) Memo Rojas, Sr. (Mexico) Freddy Van Beuren	Porsche Carrera	GTO	200	**1st**	**1st**

=== Complete European Formula Two Championship results ===
(key) (Races in bold indicate pole position; races in italics indicate fastest lap)

Year	Entrant	Chassis	Engine	1	2	3	4	5	6	7	8	9	10	11	12	13	14	Pos.	Pts
1975	Fred Opert Racing	Chevron B29	Ford	EST; Ret	THR; 4	HOC; 9	NÜR; 12	PAU	HOC	SAL	ROU	MUG	PER	SIL	ZOL; Ret	NOG; DNQ	VLL	22nd	3

=== Complete Formula One World Championship results ===
(key) (Races in bold indicate pole position; races in italics indicate fastest lap)

Year	Entrant	Chassis	Engine	1	2	3	4	5	6	7	8	9	10	11	12	13	14	15	16	17	WDC	Pts
1977	Hesketh Racing	Hesketh 308E	Ford Cosworth DFV 3.0 V8	ARG	BRA	RSA	USW	ESP	MON	BEL; DNQ	SWE; DNQ	FRA; DNQ	GBR	GER; Ret	AUT; DNQ	NED; DNQ	ITA	USA	CAN	JPN	NC	0
1978	Team Rebaque	Lotus 78	Ford Cosworth DFV 3.0 V8	ARG; DNQ	BRA; Ret	RSA; 10	USW; DNPQ	MON; DNPQ	BEL; DNPQ	ESP; Ret	SWE; 12	FRA; DNQ	GBR; Ret	GER; 6	AUT; Ret	NED; 11	ITA; DNQ	USA; Ret	CAN; DNQ		19th	1
1979	Team Rebaque	Lotus 79	Ford Cosworth DFV 3.0 V8	ARG; Ret	BRA; DNQ	RSA; Ret	USW; Ret	ESP; Ret	BEL; Ret	MON	FRA; 12	GBR; 9	GER; Ret	AUT; DNQ	NED; 7						NC	0
1979	Team Rebaque	Rebaque HR100	Ford Cosworth DFV 3.0 V8													ITA; DNQ	CAN; Ret	USA; DNQ			NC	0
1980	Parmalat Racing	Brabham BT49	Ford Cosworth DFV 3.0 V8	ARG	BRA	RSA	USW	BEL	MON	FRA	GBR; 7	GER; Ret	AUT; 10	NED; Ret	ITA; Ret	CAN; 6	USA; Ret				20th	1
1981	Parmalat Racing	Brabham BT49C	Ford Cosworth DFV 3.0 V8	USW; Ret	BRA; Ret	ARG; Ret	SMR; 4	BEL; Ret	MON; DNQ	ESP; Ret	FRA; 9	GBR; 5	GER; 4	AUT; Ret	NED; 4	ITA; Ret	CAN; Ret	CPL; Ret			10th	11

=== American open-wheel racing ===
(key) (Races in bold indicate pole position)

==== CART PPG Indy Car World Series ====
Year	Team	No.	Chassis	Engine	1	2	3	4	5	6	7	8	9	10	11	Pos.	Pts	Ref
1982	Forsythe Racing	32	March 82C	Cosworth DFX V8t	PHX	ATL; 13	MIL; DNS	CLE; 18	MCH; 25	MIL	POC	RIV; 20	ROA; 1	MCH	PHX	15th	48	

==== Indianapolis 500 ====
Year	Chassis	Engine	Start	Finish	Team
1982	March 82C	Cosworth	15	13	Forsythe Racing

== Bibliography ==
Héctor Alonso Rebaque – El ùltimo amateur de la F1 , Carlos Eduardo Jalife Villalon, Scuderia Hermanos Rodriguez, 2010 ISBN .
