= 1978 Argentine Grand Prix =

- Race 1 of 16 in the 1978 Formula One season

Race details
- Date: 15 January 1978
- Location: Buenos Aires, Argentina
- Course: Permanent road course
- Course length: 5.81 km (3.61 miles)
- Distance: 52 laps, 302.12 km (187.72 miles)
- Weather: Dry

Pole position
| Driver | (United States) Mario Andretti | Lotus-Ford |
- Time: 1:47.75

Fastest lap
| Driver | (Canada) Gilles Villeneuve | Ferrari |
- Time: 1:49.76 on lap 3

Podium
| First | (United States) Mario Andretti | Lotus-Ford |
| Second | (Austria) Niki Lauda | Brabham-Alfa Romeo |
| Third | (France) Patrick Depailler | Tyrrell-Ford |

The 1978 Argentine Grand Prix was a Formula One motor race held on 15 January 1978 at Buenos Aires. It was the first race of the 1978 World Championship of F1 Drivers and the 1978 International Cup for F1 Constructors. The 52-lap race was won from pole position by American driver Mario Andretti, driving a Lotus-Ford, with Austrian Niki Lauda second in a Brabham-Alfa Romeo and Frenchman Patrick Depailler third in a Tyrrell-Ford. This was the debut of multiple-time Constructors' Champions, Williams.

== Overview ==
Mario Andretti took pole in his Lotus, with Carlos Reutemann's Ferrari joining him on the front row and Ronnie Peterson in the other Lotus third on the grid. The start was uneventful, with Andretti and Reutemann easily keeping first and second, with John Watson in the Brabham taking third from Peterson. Watson took second from Reutemann on the seventh lap, but Andretti was uncatchable. Reutemann ran third for a while, but then began to drop down the order, and so reigning world champion Niki Lauda took third in his Brabham, which became second with ten laps left when Watson's engine blew up. Andretti motored on to a crushing victory, with Lauda second and Patrick Depailler's Tyrrell taking the final spot on the podium ahead of James Hunt in the leading McLaren, Ronnie Peterson in the other Lotus and Patrick Tambay in the other McLaren.

== Classification ==
=== Qualifying classification ===
| Pos. | Driver | Constructor | Time | No |
|---|---|---|---|---|
| 1 | Mario Andretti | Lotus-Ford | 1:47,75 | 1 |
| 2 | Carlos Reutemann | Ferrari | 1:47.84 | 2 |
| 3 | Ronnie Peterson | Lotus-Ford | 1:48,39 | 3 |
| 4 | John Watson | Brabham-Alfa Romeo | 1:48,42 | 4 |
| 5 | Niki Lauda | Brabham-Alfa Romeo | 1:48,70 | 5 |
| 6 | James Hunt | McLaren-Ford | 1:48,72 | 6 |
| 7 | Gilles Villeneuve | Ferrari | 1:48,97 | 7 |
| 8 | Jacques Laffite | Ligier-Matra | 1:49,13 | 8 |
| 9 | Patrick Tambay | McLaren-Ford | 1:49,74 | 9 |
| 10 | Patrick Depailler | Tyrrell-Ford | 1:49,69 | 10 |
| 11 | Jean-Pierre Jarier | ATS-Ford | 1:49,77 | 11 |
| 12 | Vittorio Brambilla | Surtees-Ford | 1:49,91 | 12 |
| 13 | Jochen Mass | ATS-Ford | 1:50,06 | 13 |
| 14 | Alan Jones | Williams-Ford | 1:50,11 | 14 |
| 15 | Jody Scheckter | Wolf-Ford | 1:50,35 | 15 |
| 16 | Clay Regazzoni | Shadow-Ford | 1:50,45 | 16 |
| 17 | Emerson Fittipaldi | Fittipaldi-Ford | 1:50,82 | 17 |
| 18 | Hans-Joachim Stuck | Shadow-Ford | 1:51,16 | 18 |
| 19 | Rupert Keegan | Surtees-Ford | 1:51,42 | 19 |
| 20 | Arturo Merzario | Merzario-Ford | 1:51,68 | 20 |
| 21 | Danny Ongais | Ensign-Ford | 1:51,71 | 21 |
| 22 | Lamberto Leoni | Ensign-Ford | 1:51,94 | 22 |
| 23 | Didier Pironi | Tyrrell-Ford | 1:51,99 | 23 |
| 24 | Brett Lunger | McLaren-Ford | 1:52,27 | 24 |
| 25 | Hector Rebaque | Lotus-Ford | 1:52,52 | DNQ |
| 26 | Eddie Cheever | Theodore-Ford | 1:53,25 | DNQ |
| 27 | Divina Galica | Hesketh-Ford | 1:56,69 | DNQ |

*Positions in red indicate entries that failed to qualify.

=== Race classification ===
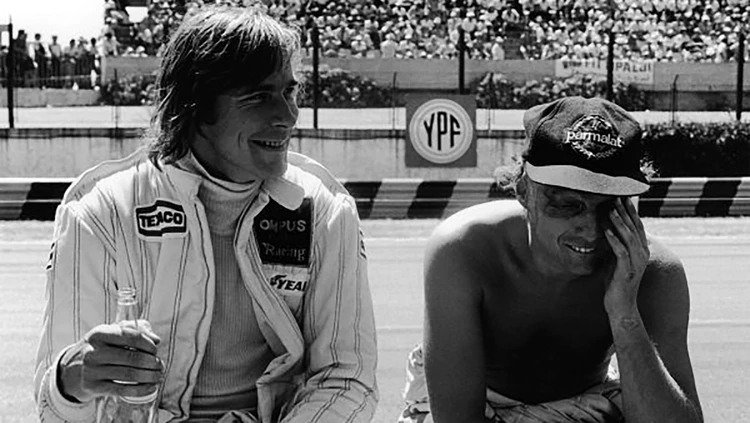
James Hunt (left) and Niki Lauda at the Grand Prix

| Pos | No | Driver | Constructor | Tyre | Laps | Time/Retired | Grid | Points |
|---|---|---|---|---|---|---|---|---|
| 1 | 5 | (United States) Mario Andretti | Lotus-Ford | G | 52 | 1:37:04.47 | 1 | 9 |
| 2 | 1 | (Austria) Niki Lauda | Brabham-Alfa Romeo | G | 52 | + 13.21 | 5 | 6 |
| 3 | 4 | (France) Patrick Depailler | Tyrrell-Ford | G | 52 | + 13.64 | 10 | 4 |
| 4 | 7 | (United Kingdom) James Hunt | McLaren-Ford | G | 52 | + 16.05 | 6 | 3 |
| 5 | 6 | (Sweden) Ronnie Peterson | Lotus-Ford | G | 52 | + 1:14.85 | 3 | 2 |
| 6 | 8 | (France) Patrick Tambay | McLaren-Ford | G | 52 | + 1:19.90 | 9 | 1 |
| 7 | 11 | (Argentina) Carlos Reutemann | Ferrari | MI | 52 | + 1:22.60 | 2 | |
| 8 | 12 | (Canada) Gilles Villeneuve | Ferrari | MI | 52 | + 1:38.88 | 7 | |
| 9 | 14 | (Brazil) Emerson Fittipaldi | Fittipaldi-Ford | G | 52 | + 1:40.60 | 17 | |
| 10 | 20 | (South Africa) Jody Scheckter | Wolf-Ford | G | 52 | + 1:43.50 | 15 | |
| 11 | 9 | (West Germany) Jochen Mass | ATS-Ford | G | 52 | + 1:49.07 | 13 | |
| 12 | 10 | (France) Jean-Pierre Jarier | ATS-Ford | G | 51 | + 1 Lap | 11 | |
| 13 | 30 | (United States) Brett Lunger | McLaren-Ford | G | 51 | + 1 Lap | 24 | |
| 14 | 3 | (France) Didier Pironi | Tyrrell-Ford | G | 51 | + 1 Lap | 23 | |
| 15 | 17 | (Switzerland) Clay Regazzoni | Shadow-Ford | G | 51 | + 1 Lap | 16 | |
| 16 | 26 | (France) Jacques Laffite | Ligier-Matra | G | 50 | Engine | 8 | |
| 17 | 16 | (West Germany) Hans-Joachim Stuck | Shadow-Ford | G | 50 | + 2 Laps | 18 | |
| 18 | 19 | (Italy) Vittorio Brambilla | Surtees-Ford | G | 50 | + 2 Laps | 12 | |
| Ret | 2 | (United Kingdom) John Watson | Brabham-Alfa Romeo | G | 41 | Engine | 4 | |
| Ret | 27 | (Australia) Alan Jones | Williams-Ford | G | 36 | Fuel System | 14 | |
| Ret | 22 | (United States) Danny Ongais | Ensign-Ford | G | 35 | Distributor | 21 | |
| Ret | 23 | (Italy) Lamberto Leoni | Ensign-Ford | G | 28 | Engine | 22 | |
| Ret | 37 | (Italy) Arturo Merzario | Merzario-Ford | G | 9 | Differential | 20 | |
| Ret | 18 | (United Kingdom) Rupert Keegan | Surtees-Ford | G | 4 | Overheating | 19 | |
| DNQ | 25 | (Mexico) Héctor Rebaque | Lotus-Ford | G | | | | |
| DNQ | 32 | (United States) Eddie Cheever | Theodore-Ford | G | | | | |
| DNQ | 24 | (United Kingdom) Divina Galica | Hesketh-Ford | G | | | | |

== Notes ==
- This was the Formula One World Championship debut for American driver Eddie Cheever and French driver and future Grand Prix winner Didier Pironi.
- This was the 1st fastest lap set by a Canadian driver.
- This was the Formula One World Championship debut for German constructor ATS, British constructor and future World Champion Williams, Hong Kong constructor Theodore — the first from Hong Kong — and the debut for Italian constructor Merzario.
- This race also marked the 50th Grand Prix start for Ensign.

== Championship standings after the race ==
Drivers' Championship standings

| Pos | Driver | Points |
|---|---|---|
| 1 | (United States) Mario Andretti | 9 |
| 2 | (Austria) Niki Lauda | 6 |
| 3 | (France) Patrick Depailler | 4 |
| 4 | (United Kingdom) James Hunt | 3 |
| 5 | (Sweden) Ronnie Peterson | 2 |

Constructors' Championship standings

| Pos | Constructor | Points |
|---|---|---|
| 1 | (United Kingdom) Lotus-Ford | 9 |
| 2 | (United Kingdom) Brabham-Alfa Romeo | 6 |
| 3 | (United Kingdom) Tyrrell-Ford | 4 |
| 4 | (United Kingdom) McLaren-Ford | 3 |

- Note: Only the top five positions are included for both sets of standings.

| Previous race: 1977 Japanese Grand Prix | FIA Formula One World Championship; 1978 season | Next race: 1978 Brazilian Grand Prix |
| Previous race: 1977 Argentine Grand Prix | Argentine Grand Prix | Next race: 1979 Argentine Grand Prix |
