= 1978 South African Grand Prix =

- Race 3 of 16 in the 1978 Formula One season
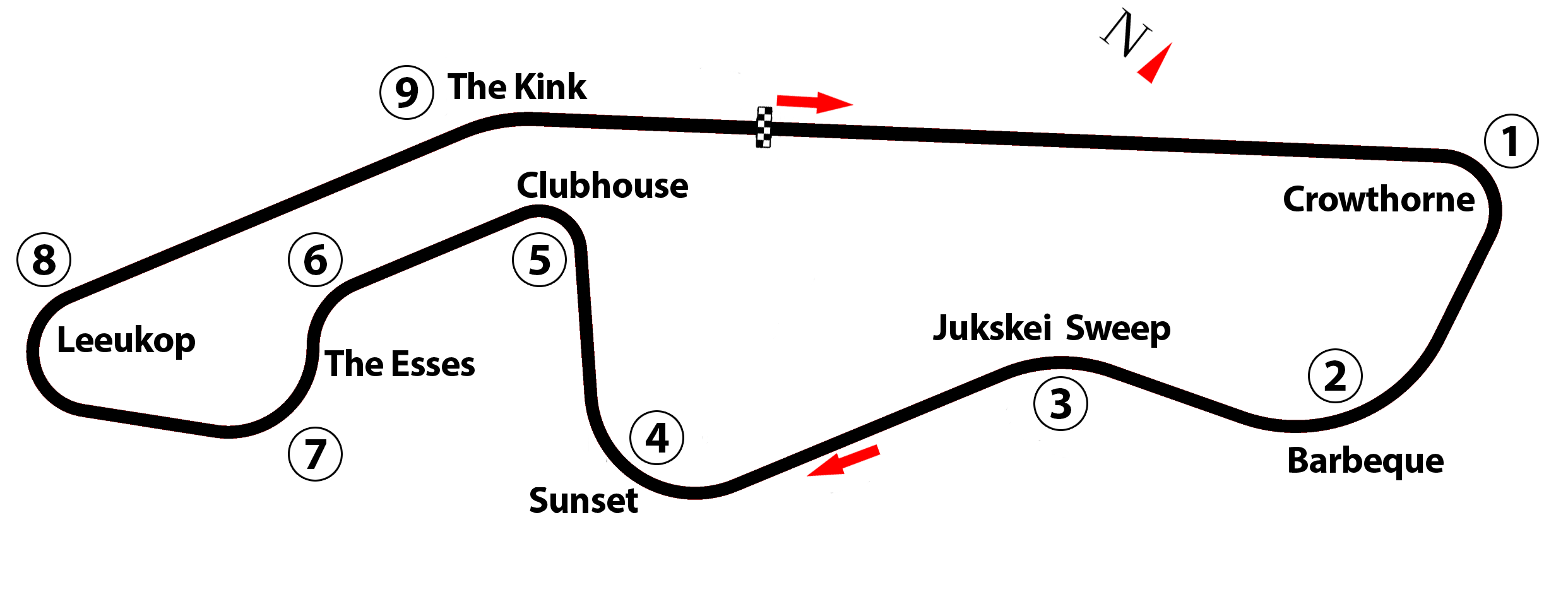

Race details
- Date: 4 March 1978
- Official name: XXIV Citizen and Asseng Grand Prix of South Africa
- Location: Kyalami; Transvaal Province, South Africa
- Course: Permanent racing facility
- Course length: 4.104 km (2.550 miles)
- Distance: 78 laps, 320.112 km (198.908 miles)
- Weather: Dry

Pole position
Driver	(Austria) Niki Lauda	Brabham-Alfa Romeo
- Time: 1:14.65

Fastest lap
Driver	(United States) Mario Andretti	Lotus-Ford
- Time: 1:17.09 on lap 2

Podium
First	(Sweden) Ronnie Peterson	Lotus-Ford
Second	(France) Patrick Depailler	Tyrrell-Ford
Third	(United Kingdom) John Watson	Brabham-Alfa Romeo

The 1978 South African Grand Prix (formally the XXIV Citizen and Asseng Grand Prix of South Africa) was a Formula One motor race held on 4 March 1978 at Kyalami. It was the third round of the 1978 Formula One season and the 300th World Championship Grand Prix held since the championship began in 1950. This was the debut race of the future world champion Keke Rosberg.

The Ferrari (312T3) and Brabham (BT46) teams had new cars in Kyalami for the race. The event also saw the return of Renault with its unique turbocharged car.

== Summary ==
Ronnie Peterson, in the Lotus 78 with its Colin Chapman-inspired ground effect aerodynamics, battled Patrick Depailler in his Tyrrell on the last lap to take a dramatic victory. John Watson finished third for Brabham. Young Italian, Riccardo Patrese got his Arrows into the lead before retiring with a blown engine. Pole sitter and reigning world champion Niki Lauda, in his first season with Brabham, retired with engine failure and the Ferraris of Carlos Reutemann and Gilles Villeneuve exited on lap 55. James Hunt, who had qualified third on the grid in his McLaren M26, only lasted five laps when his engine failed, while his new teammate Patrick Tambay, who qualified fourth, crashed out mid race.

== Classification ==
=== Qualifying ===
Pos	No	Driver	Constructor	Time	Gap
1	1	(Austria) Niki Lauda	Brabham-Alfa Romeo	1:14.65	—
2	5	(United States) Mario Andretti	Lotus-Ford	1:14.90	+0.25
3	7	(United Kingdom) James Hunt	McLaren-Ford	1:15.14	+0.49
4	8	(France) Patrick Tambay	McLaren-Ford	1:15.30	+0.65
5	20	(South Africa) Jody Scheckter	Wolf-Ford	1:15.32	+0.67
6	15	(France) Jean-Pierre Jabouille	Renault	1:15.36	+0.71
7	35	(Italy) Riccardo Patrese	Arrows-Ford	1:15.48	+0.83
8	12	(Canada) Gilles Villeneuve	Ferrari	1:15.50	+0.85
9	11	(Argentina) Carlos Reutemann	Ferrari	1:15.52	+0.87
10	2	(United Kingdom) John Watson	Brabham-Alfa Romeo	1:15.62	+0.97
11	6	(Sweden) Ronnie Peterson	Lotus-Ford	1:15.94	+1.29
12	4	(France) Patrick Depailler	Tyrrell-Ford	1:15.97	+1.32
13	3	(France) Didier Pironi	Tyrrell-Ford	1:16.38	+1.73
14	26	(France) Jacques Laffite	Ligier-Matra	1:16.40	+1.75
15	14	(Brazil) Emerson Fittipaldi	Fittipaldi-Ford	1:16.47	+1.82
16	9	(West Germany) Jochen Mass	ATS-Ford	1:16.60	+1.95
17	10	(France) Jean-Pierre Jarier	ATS-Ford	1:17.12	+2.47
18	27	(Australia) Alan Jones	Williams-Ford	1:17.16	+2.51
19	30	(United States) Brett Lunger	McLaren-Ford	1:17.30	+2.65
20	19	(Italy) Vittorio Brambilla	Surtees-Ford	1:17.32	+2.67
21	36	(West Germany) Rolf Stommelen	Arrows-Ford	1:17.49	+2.84
22	25	(Mexico) Héctor Rebaque	Lotus-Ford	1:17.50	+2.85
23	18	(United Kingdom) Rupert Keegan	Surtees-Ford	1:17.57	+2.92
24	32	(Finland) Keke Rosberg	Theodore-Ford	1:17.62	+2.97
25	24	(United States) Eddie Cheever	Hesketh-Ford	1:17.83	+3.18
26	37	(Italy) Arturo Merzario	Merzario-Ford	1:18.15	+3.50
27	31	(France) René Arnoux	Martini-Ford	1:18.21	+3.56
28	17	(Switzerland) Clay Regazzoni	Shadow-Ford	1:18.30	+3.65
29	22	(Italy) Lamberto Leoni	Ensign-Ford	1:18.38	+3.73
30	16	(West Germany) Hans-Joachim Stuck	Shadow-Ford	1:18.45	+3.80

*Positions in red indicate entries that failed to qualify.

=== Race ===
Pos	No	Driver	Constructor	Tyre	Laps	Time/Retired	Grid	Points
1	6	(Sweden) Ronnie Peterson	Lotus-Ford	G	78	1:42:15.767	12	9
2	4	(France) Patrick Depailler	Tyrrell-Ford	G	78	+0.466	11	6
3	2	(United Kingdom) John Watson	Brabham-Alfa Romeo	G	78	+4.442	10	4
4	27	(Australia) Alan Jones	Williams-Ford	G	78	+30.986	18	3
5	26	(France) Jacques Laffite	Ligier-Matra	G	78	+1:09.218	13	2
6	3	(France) Didier Pironi	Tyrrell-Ford	G	77	+1 Lap	14	1
7	5	(United States) Mario Andretti	Lotus-Ford	G	77	+1 Lap	2	
8	10	(France) Jean-Pierre Jarier	ATS-Ford	G	77	+1 Lap	17	
9	36	(West Germany) Rolf Stommelen	Arrows-Ford	G	77	+1 Lap	22	
10	25	(Mexico) Héctor Rebaque	Lotus-Ford	G	77	+1 Lap	21	
11	30	(United States) Brett Lunger	McLaren-Ford	G	76	+2 Laps	20	
12	19	(Italy) Vittorio Brambilla	Surtees-Ford	G	76	+2 Laps	19	
Ret	35	(Italy) Riccardo Patrese	Arrows-Ford	G	63	Engine	7	
Ret	20	(South Africa) Jody Scheckter	Wolf-Ford	G	59	Spun Off	5	
Ret	8	(France) Patrick Tambay	McLaren-Ford	G	56	Accident	4	
Ret	12	(Canada) Gilles Villeneuve	Ferrari	MI	55	Oil Leak	8	
Ret	11	(Argentina) Carlos Reutemann	Ferrari	MI	55	Spun Off	9	
Ret	1	(Austria) Niki Lauda	Brabham-Alfa Romeo	G	52	Engine	1	
Ret	18	(United Kingdom) Rupert Keegan	Surtees-Ford	G	52	Engine	23	
Ret	9	(West Germany) Jochen Mass	ATS-Ford	G	43	Engine	15	
Ret	37	(Italy) Arturo Merzario	Merzario-Ford	G	39	Suspension	26	
Ret	15	(France) Jean-Pierre Jabouille	Renault	MI	38	Engine	6	
Ret	32	(Finland) Keke Rosberg	Theodore-Ford	G	15	Clutch	24	
Ret	14	(Brazil) Emerson Fittipaldi	Fittipaldi-Ford	G	9	Transmission	16	
Ret	24	(United States) Eddie Cheever	Hesketh-Ford	G	8	Oil Leak	25	
Ret	7	(United Kingdom) James Hunt	McLaren-Ford	G	5	Engine	3	
DNQ	31	(France) René Arnoux	Martini-Ford	G				
DNQ	17	(Switzerland) Clay Regazzoni	Shadow-Ford	G				
DNQ	23	(Italy) Lamberto Leoni	Ensign-Ford	G				
DNQ	16	(West Germany) Hans-Joachim Stuck	Shadow-Ford	G				

== Notes ==
- This was the Formula One World Championship debut for Finnish driver and future World Champion Keke Rosberg and for French driver and future Grand Prix winner René Arnoux.
- This was the Formula One World Championship debut for French constructor Martini (failed to qualify).

== Championship standings after the race ==
Drivers' Championship standings

	Pos	Driver	Points
	1	(United States) Mario Andretti	12
5	2	(Sweden) Ronnie Peterson	11
1	3	(Austria) Niki Lauda	10
1	4	(France) Patrick Depailler	10
2	5	(Argentina) Carlos Reutemann	9

Constructors' Championship standings

	Pos	Constructor	Points
	1	(United Kingdom) Lotus-Ford	21
	2	(United Kingdom) Brabham-Alfa Romeo	14
2	3	(United Kingdom) Tyrrell-Ford	11
1	4	(Italy) Ferrari	9
1	5	(Brazil) Fittipaldi-Ford	6

- Note: Only the top five positions are included for both sets of standings.

Previous race: 1978 Brazilian Grand Prix	FIA Formula One World Championship; 1978 season	Next race: 1978 United States Grand Prix West
Previous race: 1977 South African Grand Prix	South African Grand Prix	Next race: 1979 South African Grand Prix
