= 1978 United States Grand Prix West =

- Race 4 of 16 in the 1978 Formula One season
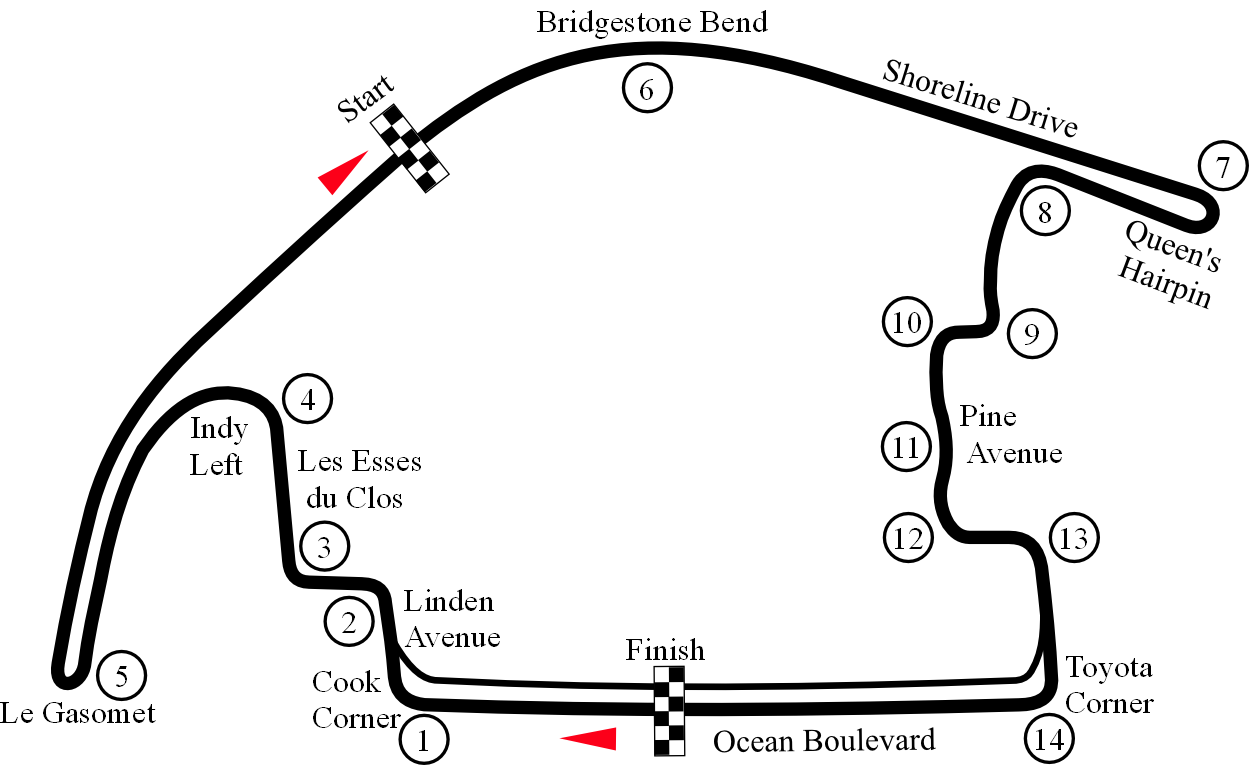

Race details
- Date: April 2, 1978
- Official name: Long Beach Grand Prix
- Location: Long Beach Street Circuit
- Course: Temporary street course
- Course length: 3.251 km (2.02 miles)
- Distance: 80 laps, 260.08 km (161.60 miles)
- Weather: Scattered clouds 17 °C (63 °F)

Pole position
Driver	(Argentina) Carlos Reutemann	Ferrari
- Time: 1:20.636

Fastest lap
Driver	(Australia) Alan Jones	Williams-Ford
- Time: 1:22.215 on lap 27

Podium
First	(Argentina) Carlos Reutemann	Ferrari
Second	(United States) Mario Andretti	Lotus-Ford
Third	(France) Patrick Depailler	Tyrrell-Ford

The 1978 United States Grand Prix West (officially the Long Beach Grand Prix) was a Formula One motor race held on April 2, 1978, at Long Beach Street Circuit.

== Summary ==
Carlos Reutemann took over at the halfway mark from Ferrari teammate Gilles Villeneuve, when the Canadian crashed out of the lead, and won by eleven seconds. It was the second American victory for the Argentine, who also won for Brabham at Watkins Glen in 1974. American Mario Andretti finished second to maintain a share of the Championship lead with Reutemann.

At the start of the weekend, though only 22 cars would make the grid, there were 30 entries, requiring a one-hour pre-qualifying session on Friday morning for the eight non-FICA members. From these eight, the fastest four would join the rest of the field in qualifying for one of the 22 starting spots.

Niki Lauda, who had placed his Ferrari on pole for the previous year's race, again set the early pace, this time in a Brabham. Late in the Friday morning session, however, Reutemann suddenly jumped to the top of the sheets with a 1:20.99 and eventually posted the day's best of 1:20.636. As usual at Long Beach, a number of drivers suffered from broken gearboxes, and on Saturday, though the weather was better, no one was able to better Reutemann's time. The first three rows of the final grid were occupied by just three teams, as Villeneuve completed the all-Ferrari front row, Brabham teammates Lauda and John Watson were third and fifth, and the Lotus pair of Andretti and Ronnie Peterson were fourth and sixth.

75,000 fans showed up for the race on Sunday. The start had been moved from in front of the pits on Ocean Boulevard to the curving "straight" on Shoreline Drive in order to avoid another first corner tangle. The strategy seemed to work, as everyone got through cleanly, though John Watson's late braking maneuver down the inside caused him to exit wide from the hairpin and force polesitter Reutemann wide with him, so Villeneuve tucked into the lead as they exited.

After one lap, the order was Villeneuve, Watson, Lauda, Reutemann, Andretti, Alan Jones, James Hunt and Peterson. In the lead of a Grand Prix for the first time, Villeneuve was driving superbly, as he began to extend his lead. On lap six, Hunt struck the wall at the apex of the last turn before the pit straight and knocked his right front wheel off. Three laps later, Watson retired from second with a blown engine. Andretti was dropping back in fourth, having chosen the wrong Goodyears and a poor top gear, and Jones was closing on him quickly. On lap 19, the Williams went through and took off after Reutemann.

With Villeneuve's lead at two seconds, Reutemann was pushing Lauda hard for second place. Suddenly, on lap 28, the Brabham went straight on at Turn One, looking as if his brakes had failed. Lauda stopped safely, however, stepped out and removed his helmet. An electrical failure had cut the motor. Meanwhile, Jones had caught up to Reutemann, and the top three were separated by just 2.5 seconds.

On lap 39, just before the halfway point, Villeneuve came up to lap Clay Regazzoni, who was in a battle with Jean-Pierre Jabouille's Renault. Rather than wait until the straight, the Canadian tried to get by in the twisty section leading up to Ocean Boulevard. There simply wasn't room, however, and, when Regazzoni braked earlier than Villeneuve expected, the Ferrari's right front wheel hit the left rear of the Shadow and was launched over the white car into the wall. Fortunately, no one was hurt.

This left Reutemann in the lead, ahead of Jones, then a long gap back to Andretti. Lap after lap, Jones hounded Reutemann, but the Ferrari was too fast down the straight for him to get by. On about lap 47, with Jones still on the Ferrari's tail, the front wings of the Williams strangely flopped down, the result of a fabrication failure. Jones continued to battle, but began losing around a second a lap. Adding to the Aussie's misery, his fuel pressure began fluctuating. His head jerked back and forth as the engine sputtered and, sometimes, cut out entirely. As one car after another passed, the struggling Williams fell all the way to eighth place. Recording the fastest lap of the race on lap 27 and repassing Emerson Fittipaldi on the last lap for seventh place were his only consolations after a spectacular drive.

Reutemann cruised to the finish, maintaining a twelve to fifteen second gap over Andretti, who had a similar cushion over Patrick Depailler in third.

== Classification ==
=== Pre-qualifying ===
Pos	No	Driver	Constructor	Time	Gap
1	36	(West Germany) Rolf Stommelen	Arrows-Ford	1:23.540	—
2	35	(Italy) Riccardo Patrese	Arrows-Ford	1:23.840	+0.300
3	37	(Italy) Arturo Merzario	Merzario-Ford	1:24.729	+1.189
4	30	(United States) Brett Lunger	McLaren-Ford	1:25.076	+1.536
5	32	(Finland) Keke Rosberg	Theodore-Ford	1:25.785	+2.245
6	25	(Mexico) Héctor Rebaque	Lotus-Ford	1:26.128	+2.588
7	39	(United States) Danny Ongais	Shadow-Ford	1:26.150	+2.610
8	24	(Republic of Ireland) Derek Daly	Hesketh-Ford	1:26.615	+3.075

*Positions in red indicate entries that failed to pre-qualify.

=== Qualifying ===
Pos	No	Driver	Constructor	Time	Gap
1	11	(Argentina) Carlos Reutemann	Ferrari	1:20.636	—
2	12	(Canada) Gilles Villeneuve	Ferrari	1:20.836	+0.200
3	1	(Austria) Niki Lauda	Brabham-Alfa Romeo	1:20.937	+0.301
4	5	(United States) Mario Andretti	Lotus-Ford	1:21.188	+0.552
5	2	(United Kingdom) John Watson	Brabham-Alfa Romeo	1:21.244	+0.608
6	6	(Sweden) Ronnie Peterson	Lotus-Ford	1:21.474	+0.838
7	7	(United Kingdom) James Hunt	McLaren-Ford	1:21.738	+1.102
8	27	(Australia) Alan Jones	Williams-Ford	1:21.935	+1.299
9	35	(Italy) Riccardo Patrese	Arrows-Ford	1:22.006	+1.370
10	20	(South Africa) Jody Scheckter	Wolf-Ford	1:22.163	+1.527
11	8	(France) Patrick Tambay	McLaren-Ford	1:22.234	+1.598
12	4	(France) Patrick Depailler	Tyrrell-Ford	1:22.414	+1.778
13	15	(France) Jean-Pierre Jabouille	Renault	1:22.491	+1.855
14	26	(France) Jacques Laffite	Ligier-Matra	1:22.630	+1.994
15	14	(Brazil) Emerson Fittipaldi	Fittipaldi-Ford	1:22.790	+2.154
16	9	(West Germany) Jochen Mass	ATS-Ford	1:23.106	+2.470
17	19	(Italy) Vittorio Brambilla	Surtees-Ford	1:23.212	+2.576
18	36	(West Germany) Rolf Stommelen	Arrows-Ford	1:23.291	+2.655
19	10	(France) Jean-Pierre Jarier	ATS-Ford	1:23.419	+2.783
20	17	(Switzerland) Clay Regazzoni	Shadow-Ford	1:23.454	+2.818
21	37	(Italy) Arturo Merzario	Merzario-Ford	1:23.589	+2.953
22	18	(United Kingdom) Rupert Keegan	Surtees-Ford	1:23.677	+3.041
23	16	(West Germany) Hans-Joachim Stuck	Shadow-Ford	1:23.733	+3.097
24	3	(France) Didier Pironi	Tyrrell-Ford	1:23.792	+3.156
25	30	(United States) Brett Lunger	McLaren-Ford	1:23.795	+3.159
26	22	(Italy) Lamberto Leoni	Ensign-Ford	1:24.008	+3.372

*Positions in red indicate entries that failed to qualify.

=== Race ===
Pos	No	Driver	Constructor	Tyre	Laps	Time/Retired	Grid	Points
1	11	(Argentina) Carlos Reutemann	Ferrari	MI	80	1:52:01.301	1	9
2	5	(United States) Mario Andretti	Lotus-Ford	G	80	+11.061 secs	4	6
3	4	(France) Patrick Depailler	Tyrrell-Ford	G	80	+28.951 secs	12	4
4	6	(Sweden) Ronnie Peterson	Lotus-Ford	G	80	+45.603 secs	6	3
5	26	(France) Jacques Laffite	Ligier-Matra	G	80	+1:22.884	14	2
6	35	(Italy) Riccardo Patrese	Arrows-Ford	G	79	+1 Lap	9	1
7	27	(Australia) Alan Jones	Williams-Ford	G	79	+1 Lap	8	
8	14	(Brazil) Emerson Fittipaldi	Fittipaldi-Ford	G	79	+1 Lap	15	
9	36	(West Germany) Rolf Stommelen	Arrows-Ford	G	79	+1 Lap	18	
10	17	(Switzerland) Clay Regazzoni	Shadow-Ford	G	79	+1 Lap	20	
11	10	(France) Jean-Pierre Jarier	ATS-Ford	G	75	+5 Laps	19	
12	8	(France) Patrick Tambay	McLaren-Ford	G	74	Accident	11	
Ret	20	(South Africa) Jody Scheckter	Wolf-Ford	G	59	Accident	10	
Ret	19	(Italy) Vittorio Brambilla	Surtees-Ford	G	50	Transmission	17	
Ret	15	(France) Jean-Pierre Jabouille	Renault	MI	43	Turbo	13	
Ret	12	(Canada) Gilles Villeneuve	Ferrari	MI	38	Accident	2	
Ret	1	(Austria) Niki Lauda	Brabham-Alfa Romeo	G	27	Ignition	3	
Ret	3	(France) Didier Pironi	Tyrrell-Ford	G	25	Gearbox	22	
Ret	37	(Italy) Arturo Merzario	Merzario-Ford	G	17	Gearbox	21	
Ret	9	(West Germany) Jochen Mass	ATS-Ford	G	11	Brakes	16	
Ret	2	(United Kingdom) John Watson	Brabham-Alfa Romeo	G	9	Engine	5	
Ret	7	(United Kingdom) James Hunt	McLaren-Ford	G	5	Accident	7	
DNS	18	(United Kingdom) Rupert Keegan	Surtees-Ford	G		Practice Accident		
DNS	16	(West Germany) Hans-Joachim Stuck	Shadow-Ford	G		Practice Accident		
DNQ	30	(United States) Brett Lunger	McLaren-Ford	G				
DNQ	22	(Italy) Lamberto Leoni	Ensign-Ford	G				
DNPQ	32	(Finland) Keke Rosberg	Theodore-Ford	G				
DNPQ	25	(Mexico) Héctor Rebaque	Lotus-Ford	G				
DNPQ	39	(United States) Danny Ongais	Shadow-Ford	G				
DNPQ	24	(Republic of Ireland) Derek Daly	Hesketh-Ford	G				

== Notes ==
- This was the Formula One World Championship debut for Irish driver Derek Daly.
- This was the 1st fastest lap set by Williams.

== Championship standings after the race ==
Drivers' Championship standings

	Pos	Driver	Points
4	1	(Argentina) Carlos Reutemann	18
1	2	(United States) Mario Andretti	18
1	3	(Sweden) Ronnie Peterson	14
	4	(France) Patrick Depailler	14
2	5	(Austria) Niki Lauda	10

Constructors' Championship standings

	Pos	Constructor	Points
	1	(United Kingdom) Lotus-Ford	27
2	2	(Italy) Ferrari	18
	3	(United Kingdom) Tyrrell-Ford	15
2	4	(United Kingdom) Brabham-Alfa Romeo	14
	5	(Brazil) Fittipaldi-Ford	6

- Note: Only the top five positions are included for both sets of standings.

Previous race: 1978 South African Grand Prix	FIA Formula One World Championship; 1978 season	Next race: 1978 Monaco Grand Prix
Previous race: 1977 United States Grand Prix West	United States Grand Prix West	Next race: 1979 United States Grand Prix West

Preceded by 1977 United States Grand Prix West	Grand Prix of Long Beach	Succeeded by 1979 United States Grand Prix West
