= 1978 Austrian Grand Prix =

- Race 12 of 16 in the 1978 Formula One season

Race details
- Date: 13 August 1978
- Official name: XVI Großer Preis von Österreich
- Location: Österreichring
- Course: Permanent racing facility
- Course length: 5.942 km (3.692 miles)
- Distance: 54 laps, 320.814 km (199.368 miles)
- Weather: Wet

Pole position
Driver	(Sweden) Ronnie Peterson	Lotus-Ford
- Time: 1:37.71

Fastest lap
Driver	(Sweden) Ronnie Peterson	Lotus-Ford
- Time: 1:43.12

Podium
First	(Sweden) Ronnie Peterson	Lotus-Ford
Second	(France) Patrick Depailler	Tyrrell-Ford
Third	(Canada) Gilles Villeneuve	Ferrari

The 1978 Austrian Grand Prix was a Formula One motor race held on 13 August 1978 at Österreichring. This was the last win for Ronnie Peterson before his death at the 1978 Italian Grand Prix, and was also the last win for a Swedish Formula One driver, as of 2025.

== Qualifying ==
=== Pre-qualifying classification ===
Pos.	Driver	Constructor	Time
—	Harald Ertl	Ensign-Ford	
—	Héctor Rebaque	Lotus-Ford	
—	Nelson Piquet	McLaren-Ford	
—	Brett Lunger	McLaren-Ford	
—	René Arnoux	Martini-Ford	
—	Keke Rosberg	Wolf-Ford	
—	Arturo Merzario	Merzario-Ford	
8	Rolf Stommelen	Arrows-Ford	1:44.88

*Positions in red indicate entries that failed to pre-qualify.

=== Qualifying classification ===
Pos.	Driver	Constructor	Time	No
1	Ronnie Peterson	Lotus-Ford	1:37.71	1
2	Mario Andretti	Lotus-Ford	1:37.76	2
3	Jean-Pierre Jabouille	Renault	1:38.32	3
4	Carlos Reutemann	Ferrari	1:38.50	4
5	Jacques Laffite	Ligier-Matra	1:38.71	5
6	Emerson Fittipaldi	Fittipaldi-Ford	1:38.77	6
7	Jody Scheckter	Wolf-Ford	1:38.85	7
8	James Hunt	McLaren-Ford	1:39.10	8
9	Didier Pironi	Tyrrell-Ford	1:39.23	9
10	John Watson	Brabham-Alfa Romeo	1:39.35	10
11	Gilles Villeneuve	Ferrari	1:39.40	11
12	Niki Lauda	Brabham-Alfa Romeo	1:39.49	12
13	Patrick Depailler	Tyrrell-Ford	1:39.51	13
14	Patrick Tambay	McLaren-Ford	1:39.59	14
15	Alan Jones	Williams-Ford	1:39.81	15
16	Riccardo Patrese	Arrows-Ford	1:40.11	16
17	Brett Lunger	McLaren-Ford	1:40.80	17
18	Héctor Rebaque	Lotus-Ford	1:40.84	18
19	Derek Daly	Ensign-Ford	1:41.02	19
20	Nelson Piquet	McLaren-Ford	1:41.15	20
21	Vittorio Brambilla	Surtees-Ford	1:41.16	21
22	Clay Regazzoni	Shadow-Ford	1:41.42	22
23	Hans-Joachim Stuck	Shadow-Ford	1:41.58	23
24	Harald Ertl	Ensign-Ford	1:41.60	24
25	Keke Rosberg	Wolf-Ford	1:41.72	25
26	René Arnoux	Martini-Ford	1:41.84	26
27	Arturo Merzario	Merzario-Ford	1:41.85	DNQ
28	Jochen Mass	ATS-Ford	1:42.47	DNQ
29	Rupert Keegan	Surtees-Ford	1:43.06	DNQ
30	Hans Binder	ATS-Ford	1:44.46	DNQ

*Positions in red indicate entries that failed to qualify.

== Race ==
=== Race start and rain ===
The crowds for the Austrian GP were full of Niki Lauda fans; but for them Lauda qualified only 12th as the Lotus cars again took the front row, with Ronnie Peterson on pole. The surprise in qualifying was Jean-Pierre Jabouille who qualified his turbocharged Renault third. The race started at 2:00 pm local, the start saw Peterson lead into the first corner, with Carlos Reutemann snatching second from Mario Andretti. Andretti tried to get the place back later in the lap, but the two collided and Andretti retired after his car spun into the barriers while Reutemann lost a couple of places to Patrick Depailler and Jody Scheckter. On the third lap, Scheckter slid off and crashed into Andretti's abandoned Lotus, damaging both cars. On the fourth lap, a heavy rainshower hit the track and Reutemann spun off and was beached but the marshals push-started his car as it was in a dangerous position, while Nelson Piquet and Héctor Rebaque crashed out. At the end of lap six, Gilles Villeneuve headed for the pits for rain tyres having executed a monumental spin, and next lap Jabouille lost control of the Renault, managed to gather it all up and also stopped for rain tyres, while Emerson Fittipaldi was into the pits and Pironi spun off and knocked the nose cone off his Tyrrell but rejoined. Peterson finished lap seven in full control of the situation and when the last car had gone through the officials decided to stop the race and the red and black flags were held out, meaning "Race to stop and restart at a later time." After the decision had been made Peterson spun off onto the grass and got stuck, so it was Depailler who arrived first at the red and black flags. As the rain poured down, the race was stopped. It was clearly stated that the Grand Prix would now be considered a two-part race, the first part having run for seven laps and the starting grid for the 47-lap second part would be in the order in which the competitors completed lap seven. Only those cars that arrived back at the pits under their own power would be allowed to start in the second part and there would be no changing to spare cars, though repairs and resetting of suspension and brakes for rain conditions would be allowed, and naturally everyone fitted rain tyres. During the red flag, Rebaque's was towed back by the marshals undamaged but could not join the restart, though Peterson and Reutemann drove their cars back, having been extricated from the grass verges. Patrese's Arrows was towed in with the nose cone damage, and should have been wheeled away along with Rebaque's Lotus but in the confusion the Arrows management sneaked the car into the pit lane and started repairing it, even though it was illegal. The restart was timed for 3:00 pm giving everyone adequate time to prepare their cars for a really wet track. At 2:40 pm. the pit road was to be opened to allow cars to set off on a warm-up lap, and it was to shut at 2:50 pm and anyone left behind would be out of the second part of the race. It was all quite clear, but there was some discussion as to whether Peterson and Reutemann had received outside assistance driving the first part of the race, even though they had driven their cars back to the pits. With Peterson on pole position and Reutemann in last position, having spun off on lap 5, it was a delicate situation, but was resolved by allowing them both to restart, though Reutemann would be considered to be two laps behind at the start of the second race. There should have been 21 cars lined up in pairs for the second part with Andretti, Scheckter, Rebaque and Piquet already out but there were 22 cars on new grid due to the Arrows team's shady tactics for Patrese.

=== Race restart ===
The race restarted at 3:15 pm after the rain relented, and once again Peterson led followed by Depailler and Lauda. As the track began to dry, Peterson started to pull away, and behind, Reutemann was on a charge and passed Lauda for third but he was black-flagged for receiving outside assistance, and Lauda crashed out soon after, leaving Gilles Villeneuve third. The drivers changed to slicks but the top 3 remained the same and stayed so till the end; Peterson winning ahead of Depailler, with Villeneuve taking his first ever podium.

=== Classification ===
Pos	No	Driver	Constructor	Tyre	Laps	Time/Retired	Grid	Points
1	6	(Sweden) Ronnie Peterson	Lotus-Ford	G	54	1:41:21.57	1	9
2	4	(France) Patrick Depailler	Tyrrell-Ford	G	54	+47.44 secs	13	6
3	12	(Canada) Gilles Villeneuve	Ferrari	MI	54	+1:39.76	11	4
4	14	(Brazil) Emerson Fittipaldi	Fittipaldi-Ford	G	53	+1 Lap	6	3
5	26	(France) Jacques Laffite	Ligier-Matra	G	53	+1 Lap	5	2
6	19	(Italy) Vittorio Brambilla	Surtees-Ford	G	53	+1 Lap	21	1
7	2	(United Kingdom) John Watson	Brabham-Alfa Romeo	G	53	+1 lap	10	
8	30	(United States) Brett Lunger	McLaren-Ford	G	52	+2 Laps	17	
9	31	(France) René Arnoux	Martini-Ford	G	52	+2 Laps	26	
NC	17	(Switzerland) Clay Regazzoni	Shadow-Ford	G	50	+4 Laps	22	
NC	32	(Finland) Keke Rosberg	Wolf-Ford	G	49	+5 Laps	25	
DSQ	22	(Republic of Ireland) Derek Daly	Ensign-Ford	G	41	Push start	19	
Ret	8	(France) Patrick Tambay	McLaren-Ford	G	40	Accident	14	
Ret	16	(West Germany) Hans-Joachim Stuck	Shadow-Ford	G	33	Accident	23	
Ret	15	(France) Jean-Pierre Jabouille	Renault	MI	31	Gearbox	3	
DSQ	11	(Argentina) Carlos Reutemann	Ferrari	MI	28	Push start	4	
Ret	1	(Austria) Niki Lauda	Brabham-Alfa Romeo	G	27	Accident	12	
Ret	3	(France) Didier Pironi	Tyrrell-Ford	G	20	Accident	9	
Ret	7	(United Kingdom) James Hunt	McLaren-Ford	G	7	Accident	8	
Ret	27	(Australia) Alan Jones	Williams-Ford	G	7	Accident	15	
Ret	35	(Italy) Riccardo Patrese	Arrows-Ford	G	7	Accident	16	
Ret	23	(Austria) Harald Ertl	Ensign-Ford	G	7	Accident	24	
Ret	25	(Mexico) Héctor Rebaque	Lotus-Ford	G	4	Accident	18	
Ret	29	(Brazil) Nelson Piquet	McLaren-Ford	G	4	Accident	20	
Ret	20	(South Africa) Jody Scheckter	Wolf-Ford	G	3	Accident	7	
Ret	5	(United States) Mario Andretti	Lotus-Ford	G	0	Accident	2	
DNQ	37	(Italy) Arturo Merzario	Merzario-Ford	G				
DNQ	9	(West Germany) Jochen Mass	ATS-Ford	G				
DNQ	18	(United Kingdom) Rupert Keegan	Surtees-Ford	G				
DNQ	10	(Austria) Hans Binder	ATS-Ford	G				
DNPQ	36	(West Germany) Rolf Stommelen	Arrows-Ford	G				
PO	18	(United Kingdom) Brian Henton	Surtees-Ford	G		Keegan's car		

== Notes ==
- This was the 10th fastest lap and 1st Grand Slam set by a Swedish driver.
- This was the 1st podium finish for a Canadian driver.
- This was Ronnie Peterson's 2nd win of the Austrian Grand Prix, becoming the first driver to win the Austrian Grand Prix multiple times. Since the inaugural 1964 Austrian Grand Prix, there were nine different winners.
- This was the 3rd win of the Austrian Grand Prix for Lotus. It broke the previous record set by Ferrari at the 1970 Austrian Grand Prix.
- This was the 100th fastest lap set by a Ford-powered car.

== Championship standings after the race ==
Drivers' Championship standings

	Pos	Driver	Points
	1	(United States) **Mario Andretti***	54
	2	(Sweden) **Ronnie Peterson***	45
2	3	(France) **Patrick Depailler***	32
1	4	(Argentina) **Carlos Reutemann***	31
1	5	(Austria) **Niki Lauda***	31

Constructors' Championship standings

	Pos	Constructor	Points
	1	(United Kingdom) **Lotus-Ford***	76
	2	(United Kingdom) **Brabham-Alfa Romeo***	40
1	3	(United Kingdom) Tyrrell-Ford	36
1	4	(Italy) Ferrari	35
1	5	(France) Ligier-Matra	16

- Note: Only the top five positions are included for both sets of standings.
- Competitors marked in bold and with an asterisk still had a theoretical chance of becoming World Champion.

Previous race: 1978 German Grand Prix	FIA Formula One World Championship; 1978 season	Next race: 1978 Dutch Grand Prix
Previous race: 1977 Austrian Grand Prix	Austrian Grand Prix	Next race: 1979 Austrian Grand Prix
