= 1978 Brazilian Grand Prix =

- Race 2 of 16 in the 1978 Formula One season
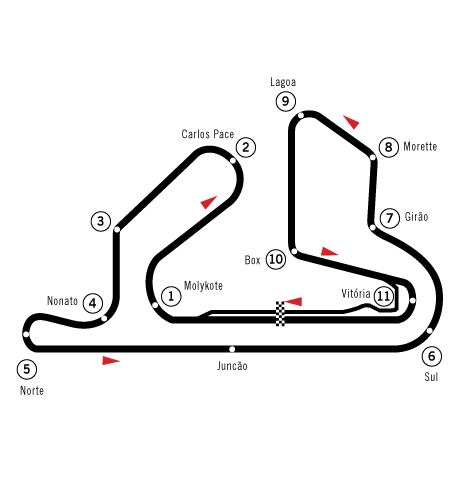

Race details
- Date: January 29, 1978
- Location: Jacarepagua, Brazil
- Course: Permanent racing facility
- Course length: 5.031 km (3.126 miles)
- Distance: 63 laps, 316.953 km (196.945 miles)
- Weather: Very hot and humid, 100.4°F (38°C)

Pole position
Driver	(Sweden) Ronnie Peterson	Lotus-Ford
- Time: 1:40.45

Fastest lap
Driver	(Argentina) Carlos Reutemann	Ferrari
- Time: 1:43.07 on lap 35

Podium
First	(Argentina) Carlos Reutemann	Ferrari
Second	(Brazil) Emerson Fittipaldi	Fittipaldi-Ford
Third	(Austria) Niki Lauda	Brabham-Alfa Romeo

The 1978 Brazilian Grand Prix was a Formula One motor race held on 29 January 1978 at Jacarepagua. The race was run at the height of summer in Rio de Janeiro in 100 °F temperatures, and it was won by Argentine driver Carlos Reutemann driving a Ferrari 312T2 in a flag-to-flag performance. The win also represented the first win for tyre manufacturer Michelin. Local driver Emerson Fittipaldi was second, scoring the first podium finish for the Fittipaldi team with Austrian Brabham driver Niki Lauda finishing third. French driver Didier Pironi took his first points in Formula One, finishing sixth, while Arrows made its F1 debut with Riccardo Patrese finishing tenth, four laps down.

== Qualifying ==
=== Qualifying classification ===
Pos.	Driver	Constructor	Time	No
1	(Sweden) Ronnie Peterson	Lotus-Ford	1:40.45	1
2	(United Kingdom) James Hunt	McLaren-Ford	1:40.53	2
3	(United States) Mario Andretti	Lotus-Ford	1:40.62	3
4	(Argentina) Carlos Reutemann	Ferrari	1:40.73	4
5	(France) Patrick Tambay	McLaren-Ford	1:40.94	5
6	(Canada) Gilles Villeneuve	Ferrari	1:40.97	6
7	(Brazil) Emerson Fittipaldi	Fittipaldi-Ford	1:41.50	7
8	(Australia) Alan Jones	Williams-Ford	1:41.87	8
9	(West Germany) Hans-Joachim Stuck	Shadow-Ford	1:42.07	9
10	(Austria) Niki Lauda	Brabham-Alfa Romeo	1:42.08	10
11	(France) Patrick Depailler	Tyrrell-Ford	1:42.10	11
12	(South Africa) Jody Scheckter	Wolf-Ford	1:42.11	12
13	(United States) Brett Lunger	McLaren-Ford	1:42.65	13
14	(France) Jacques Laffite	Ligier-Matra	1:42.71	14
15	(Switzerland) Clay Regazzoni	Shadow-Ford	1:42.80	15
16	(France) Jean-Pierre Jarier	ATS-Ford	1:42.91	16
17	(Italy) Lamberto Leoni	Ensign-Ford	1:43.17	17
18	(Italy) Riccardo Patrese	Arrows-Ford	1:43.19	18
19	(France) Didier Pironi	Tyrrell-Ford	1:43.55	19
20	(West Germany) Jochen Mass	ATS-Ford	1:43.74	20
21	(United Kingdom) John Watson	Brabham-Alfa Romeo	1:43.75	21
22	(Mexico) Héctor Rebaque	Lotus-Ford	1:43.86	22
23	(United States) Danny Ongais	Ensign-Ford	1:43.94	23
24	(United Kingdom) Rupert Keegan	Surtees-Ford	1:44.20	24
25	(Italy) Arturo Merzario	Merzario-Ford	1:44.20	DNQ
26	(United States) Eddie Cheever	Theodore-Ford	1:44.28	DNQ
27	(Italy) Vittorio Brambilla	Surtees-Ford	1:44.66	DNQ
28	(United Kingdom) Divina Galica	Hesketh-Ford	1:46.79	DNQ

*Positions in red indicate entries that failed to qualify.

== Race ==
=== Report ===
The first Formula One race held at Jacarepagua was held in typically extreme weather conditions of January in Rio, meaning the race was held in both hot and humid conditions. Ronnie Peterson took the pole position in the leading Lotus ahead of James Hunt in the leading McLaren, teammate Mario Andretti in the other Lotus, Carlos Reutemann in the leading Ferrari, Patrick Tambay in the second McLaren and Gilles Villeneuve in the other Ferrari.

Peterson got off to a poor start from the pole and dropped back to 4th, whilst into the first corner it was Reutemann from 4th on the grid who got the best start and lead the first lap for Ferrari ahead of Hunt, Andretti, Peterson, Tambay and Villeneuve. Hunt in the leading McLaren and Andretti in the leading Lotus were running 2nd and 3rd behind Reutemann, until Hunt was forced to pit for tyres whilst Andretti soon started to suffer from gearbox problems and dropped to 4th, handing their 2nd and 3rd places over to home favourite Emerson Fittipaldi and reigning world-champion Niki Lauda respectively. Peterson eventually retired after a collision by lap 16. The hot and humid conditions had eventually caused Hunt, Tambay and Villeneuve in the other Ferrari to all spin off and crash by lap 36. Reutemann meanwhile had no challengers for the lead all race long, and won by a comfortable margin ahead of former double world-champion Fittipaldi, Lauda, Andretti in the remaining Lotus, Clay Regazzoni in the Shadow and Didier Pironi in the Tyrrell.

=== Classification ===
Pos	No	Driver	Constructor	Tyre	Laps	Time/Retired	Grid	Points
1	11	(Argentina) Carlos Reutemann	Ferrari	MI	63	1:49:59.86	4	9
2	14	(Brazil) Emerson Fittipaldi	Fittipaldi-Ford	G	63	+49.13	7	6
3	1	(Austria) Niki Lauda	Brabham-Alfa Romeo	G	63	+57.02	10	4
4	5	(United States) Mario Andretti	Lotus-Ford	G	63	+1:33.12	3	3
5	17	(Switzerland) Clay Regazzoni	Shadow-Ford	G	62	+1 Lap	15	2
6	3	(France) Didier Pironi	Tyrrell-Ford	G	62	+1 Lap	19	1
7	9	(West Germany) Jochen Mass	ATS-Ford	G	62	+1 Lap	20	
8	2	(United Kingdom) John Watson	Brabham-Alfa Romeo	G	61	+2 Laps	21	
9	26	(France) Jacques Laffite	Ligier-Matra	G	61	+2 Laps	14	
10	36	(Italy) Riccardo Patrese	Arrows-Ford	G	59	+4 Laps	18	
11	27	(Australia) Alan Jones	Williams-Ford	G	58	+5 Laps	8	
Ret	25	(Mexico) Héctor Rebaque	Lotus-Ford	G	40	Physical	22	
Ret	12	(Canada) Gilles Villeneuve	Ferrari	MI	35	Spun Off	6	
Ret	8	(France) Patrick Tambay	McLaren-Ford	G	34	Spun Off	5	
Ret	7	(United Kingdom) James Hunt	McLaren-Ford	G	25	Spun Off	2	
Ret	16	(West Germany) Hans-Joachim Stuck	Shadow-Ford	G	25	Fuel System	9	
Ret	20	(South Africa) Jody Scheckter	Wolf-Ford	G	16	Accident	12	
Ret	6	(Sweden) Ronnie Peterson	Lotus-Ford	G	15	Collision	1	
Ret	22	(United States) Danny Ongais	Ensign-Ford	G	13	Brakes	23	
Ret	30	(United States) Brett Lunger	McLaren-Ford	G	11	Overheating	13	
Ret	4	(France) Patrick Depailler	Tyrrell-Ford	G	8	Accident	11	
Ret	18	(United Kingdom) Rupert Keegan	Surtees-Ford	G	5	Accident	24	
DNS	23	(Italy) Lamberto Leoni	Ensign-Ford	G	0	Transmission	17	
DNS	10	(France) Jean-Pierre Jarier	ATS-Ford	G		Mass Drove Car	16	
DNQ	37	(Italy) Arturo Merzario	Merzario-Ford	G				
DNQ	32	(United States) Eddie Cheever	Theodore-Ford	G				
DNQ	19	(Italy) Vittorio Brambilla	Surtees-Ford	G				
DNQ	24	(United Kingdom) Divina Galica	Hesketh-Ford	G				

== Notes ==
- This was the Formula One World Championship debut for British constructor Arrows.

== Championship standings after the race ==
Drivers' Championship standings

	Pos	Driver	Points
	1	(United States) Mario Andretti	12
	2	(Austria) Niki Lauda	10
4	3	(Argentina) Carlos Reutemann	9
5	4	(Brazil) Emerson Fittipaldi	6
2	5	(France) Patrick Depailler	4

Constructors' Championship standings

	Pos	Constructor	Points
	1	(United Kingdom) Lotus-Ford	12
	2	(United Kingdom) Brabham-Alfa Romeo	10
2	3	(Italy) Ferrari	9
4	4	(Brazil) Fittipaldi-Ford	6
2	5	(United Kingdom) Tyrrell-Ford	5

- Note: Only the top five positions are included for both sets of standings.

Previous race: 1978 Argentine Grand Prix	FIA Formula One World Championship; 1978 season	Next race: 1978 South African Grand Prix
Previous race: 1977 Brazilian Grand Prix	Brazilian Grand Prix	Next race: 1979 Brazilian Grand Prix
