= 1978 German Grand Prix =

- Race 11 of 16 in the 1978 Formula One season

Race details
- Date: 30 July 1978
- Official name: XL Großer Preis von Deutschland
- Location: Hockenheimring, West Germany
- Course: Permanent racing facility
- Course length: 6.790 km (4.219 miles)
- Distance: 45 laps, 305.505 km (189.81 miles)
- Weather: Dry

Pole position
Driver	(United States) Mario Andretti	Lotus-Ford
- Time: 1:51.90

Fastest lap
Driver	(Sweden) Ronnie Peterson	Lotus-Ford
- Time: 1:55.62 on lap 26

Podium
First	(United States) Mario Andretti	Lotus-Ford
Second	(South Africa) Jody Scheckter	Wolf-Ford
Third	(France) Jacques Laffite	Ligier-Matra

The 1978 German Grand Prix was a Formula One motor race held on 30 July 1978 at the Hockenheimring. Mario Andretti won the race from pole position, ahead of Jody Scheckter and Jacques Laffite.

== Report ==
This was the debut race of future world champion Nelson Piquet. Mario Andretti took pole with Ronnie Peterson in second and Niki Lauda third. At the start, Peterson got off better and took the lead from Andretti, and held it for four laps before Andretti retook it. Lauda ran third in the early stages, before he was passed by Alan Jones, and the duo battled until Lauda's engine failed, his fifth engine related retirement of the year. The two Lotus cars were cruising at the front, and Jones ran third comfortably until he retired with a fuel vaporization problem. Lotus's hopes of a 1–2 ended when Peterson's gearbox failed, Andretti was unaffected by that and cruised to his fifth win of the season, with Jody Scheckter second and Jacques Laffite third.

== Classification ==
=== Pre-qualifying ===
Pos	No	Driver	Constructor	Time	Gap
1	32	(Finland) Keke Rosberg	Wolf-Ford	2:10.13	—
2	37	(Italy) Arturo Merzario	Merzario-Ford	2:10.82	+0.69
3	25	(Mexico) Héctor Rebaque	Lotus-Ford	2:11.80	+1.67
4*	31	(France) René Arnoux	Martini-Ford	2:12.25	+2.12
5*	30	(United States) Brett Lunger	McLaren-Ford	2:12.45	+2.32

- Positions in red and an asterisk indicate entries that failed to pre-qualify.

=== Qualifying ===
Pos	No	Driver	Constructor	Time	Gap
1	5	(United States) Mario Andretti	Lotus-Ford	1:51.90	—
2	6	(Sweden) Ronnie Peterson	Lotus-Ford	1:51.99	+0.09
3	1	(Austria) Niki Lauda	Brabham-Alfa Romeo	1:52.29	+0.39
4	20	(South Africa) Jody Scheckter	Wolf-Ford	1:52.29	+0.78
5	2	(United Kingdom) John Watson	Brabham-Alfa Romeo	1:52.84	+0.94
6	27	(Australia) Alan Jones	Williams-Ford	1:53.50	+1.60
7	26	(France) Jacques Laffite	Ligier-Matra	1:53.40	+1.50
8	7	(United Kingdom) James Hunt	McLaren-Ford	1:53.46	+1.56
9	15	(France) Jean-Pierre Jabouille	Renault	1:53.61	+1.71
10	14	(Brazil) Emerson Fittipaldi	Fittipaldi-Ford	1:54.03	+2.13
11	8	(France) Patrick Tambay	McLaren-Ford	1:54.04	+2.14
12	11	(Argentina) Carlos Reutemann	Ferrari	1:54.17	+2.27
13	4	(France) Patrick Depailler	Tyrrell-Ford	1:54.32	+2.42
14	35	(Italy) Riccardo Patrese	Arrows-Ford	1:54.34	+2.44
15	12	(Canada) Gilles Villeneuve	Ferrari	1:54.40	+2.50
16	3	(France) Didier Pironi	Tyrrell-Ford	1:54.63	+2.73
17	36	(West Germany) Rolf Stommelen	Arrows-Ford	1:55.18	+3.28
18	25	(Mexico) Héctor Rebaque	Lotus-Ford	1:55.57	+3.67
19	32	(Finland) Keke Rosberg	Wolf-Ford	1:55.57	+3.67
20	19	(Italy) Vittorio Brambilla	Surtees-Ford	1:55.86	+3.96
21	22	(Brazil) Nelson Piquet	Ensign-Ford	1:56.15	+4.25
22	9	(West Germany) Jochen Mass	ATS-Ford	1:56.21	+4.31
23	23	(Austria) Harald Ertl	Ensign-Ford	1:56.25	+4.35
24	16	(West Germany) Hans-Joachim Stuck	Shadow-Ford	1:56.45	+4.55
25*	17	(Switzerland) Clay Regazzoni	Shadow-Ford	1:56.57	+4.67
26*	10	(France) Jean-Pierre Jarier	ATS-Ford	1:57.40	+5.50
27*	18	(United Kingdom) Rupert Keegan	Surtees-Ford	1:57.86	+5.96
28*	37	(Italy) Arturo Merzario	Merzario-Ford	1:58.31	+6.41

- Positions in red and an asterisk indicate entries that failed to qualify.

=== Race ===
Pos	No	Driver	Constructor	Tyre	Laps	Time/Retired	Grid	Points
1	5	(United States) Mario Andretti	Lotus-Ford	G	45	1:28:00.90	1	9
2	20	(South Africa) Jody Scheckter	Wolf-Ford	G	45	+15.35 secs	4	6
3	26	(France) Jacques Laffite	Ligier-Matra	G	45	+28.01 secs	7	4
4	14	(Brazil) Emerson Fittipaldi	Fittipaldi-Ford	G	45	+36.88 secs	10	3
5	3	(France) Didier Pironi	Tyrrell-Ford	G	45	+57.26 secs	16	2
6	25	(Mexico) Héctor Rebaque	Lotus-Ford	G	45	+1:37.86	18	1
7	2	(United Kingdom) John Watson	Brabham-Alfa Romeo	G	45	+1:39.53	5	
8	12	(Canada) Gilles Villeneuve	Ferrari	M	45	+1:56.87	15	
9	35	(Italy) Riccardo Patrese	Arrows-Ford	G	44	+1 Lap	14	
10	32	(Finland) Keke Rosberg	Wolf-Ford	G	42	+3 Laps	19	
11	23	(Austria) Harald Ertl	Ensign-Ford	G	41	Engine	23	
DSQ	36	(West Germany) Rolf Stommelen	Arrows-Ford	G	42	Illegal Pit Stop	17	
Ret	6	(Sweden) Ronnie Peterson	Lotus-Ford	G	36	Gearbox	2	
DSQ	7	(United Kingdom) James Hunt	McLaren-Ford	G	34	Illegal Pit Stop	8	
Ret	27	(Australia) Alan Jones	Williams-Ford	G	31	Fuel System	6	
Ret	22	(Brazil) Nelson Piquet	Ensign-Ford	G	31	Engine	21	
Ret	19	(Italy) Vittorio Brambilla	Surtees-Ford	G	24	Fuel System	20	
Ret	8	(France) Patrick Tambay	McLaren-Ford	G	16	Accident	11	
Ret	11	(Argentina) Carlos Reutemann	Ferrari	M	14	Fuel System	12	
Ret	1	(Austria) Niki Lauda	Brabham-Alfa Romeo	G	11	Engine	3	
Ret	15	(France) Jean-Pierre Jabouille	Renault	M	5	Engine	9	
Ret	9	(West Germany) Jochen Mass	ATS-Ford	G	1	Accident	22	
Ret	16	(West Germany) Hans-Joachim Stuck	Shadow-Ford	G	1	Accident	24	
Ret	4	(France) Patrick Depailler	Tyrrell-Ford	G	0	Accident	13	
DNQ	17	(Switzerland) Clay Regazzoni	Shadow-Ford	G				
DNQ	10	(France) Jean-Pierre Jarier	ATS-Ford	G				
DNQ	18	(United Kingdom) Rupert Keegan	Surtees-Ford	G				
DNQ	37	(Italy) Arturo Merzario	Merzario-Ford	G				
DNPQ	31	(France) René Arnoux	Martini-Ford	G				
DNPQ	30	(United States) Brett Lunger	McLaren-Ford	G				

== Notes ==
- This was the Formula One World Championship debut for Brazilian driver and future World Champion Nelson Piquet.
- This was the 10th Grand Prix start for Arrows and for ATS. It was also the 200th Grand Prix start for Brabham; in those 200 races Brabham won 19 Grands Prix, achieved 83 podium finishes, set 20 pole positions, 26 fastest laps, 3 Grand Slams and won 2 Driver's and 2 Constructor's Championships.
- Rolf Stommelen and James Hunt were disqualified for taking a wrong entry into the pit lane

== Championship standings after the race ==
Drivers' Championship standings

Pos	Driver	Points
1	(United States) **Mario Andretti***	54
2	(Sweden) **Ronnie Peterson***	36
3	(Argentina) **Carlos Reutemann***	31
4	(Austria) **Niki Lauda***	31
5	(France) **Patrick Depailler***	26

Constructors' Championship standings

	Pos	Constructor	Points
	1	(United Kingdom) **Lotus-Ford***	67
	2	(United Kingdom) **Brabham-Alfa Romeo***	40
	3	(Italy) **Ferrari***	31
	4	(United Kingdom) **Tyrrell-Ford***	30
3	5	(Canada) Wolf-Ford	14

- Note: Only the top five positions are included for both sets of standings.
- Competitors marked in bold and with an asterisk still had a theoretical chance of becoming World Champion.

Previous race: 1978 British Grand Prix	FIA Formula One World Championship; 1978 season	Next race: 1978 Austrian Grand Prix
Previous race: 1977 German Grand Prix	German Grand Prix	Next race: 1979 German Grand Prix
