= 1978 Dutch Grand Prix =

- Race 13 of 16 in the 1978 Formula One season

Race details
- Date: 27 August 1978
- Official name: XXVI Grote Prijs van Nederland
- Location: Zandvoort
- Course: Permanent racing facility
- Course length: 4.226 km (2.626 miles)
- Distance: 75 laps, 316.95 km (196.95 miles)
- Weather: Dry

Pole position
Driver	(United States) Mario Andretti	Lotus-Ford
- Time: 1:16.36

Fastest lap
Driver	(Austria) Niki Lauda	Brabham-Alfa Romeo
- Time: 1:19.57 on lap 57

Podium
First	(United States) Mario Andretti	Lotus-Ford
Second	(Sweden) Ronnie Peterson	Lotus-Ford
Third	(Austria) Niki Lauda	Brabham-Alfa Romeo

The 1978 Dutch Grand Prix was a Formula One motor race held at Zandvoort on 27 August 1978. It was the 13th race of the 1978 Formula One season. It was the final career victory for Mario Andretti, who went on to win the championship after Ronnie Peterson's fatal crash at Monza. It is also the last 1-2 finish for the original Lotus team, and also, the last win for an American Formula One driver, as of the 2025 season.

== Report ==
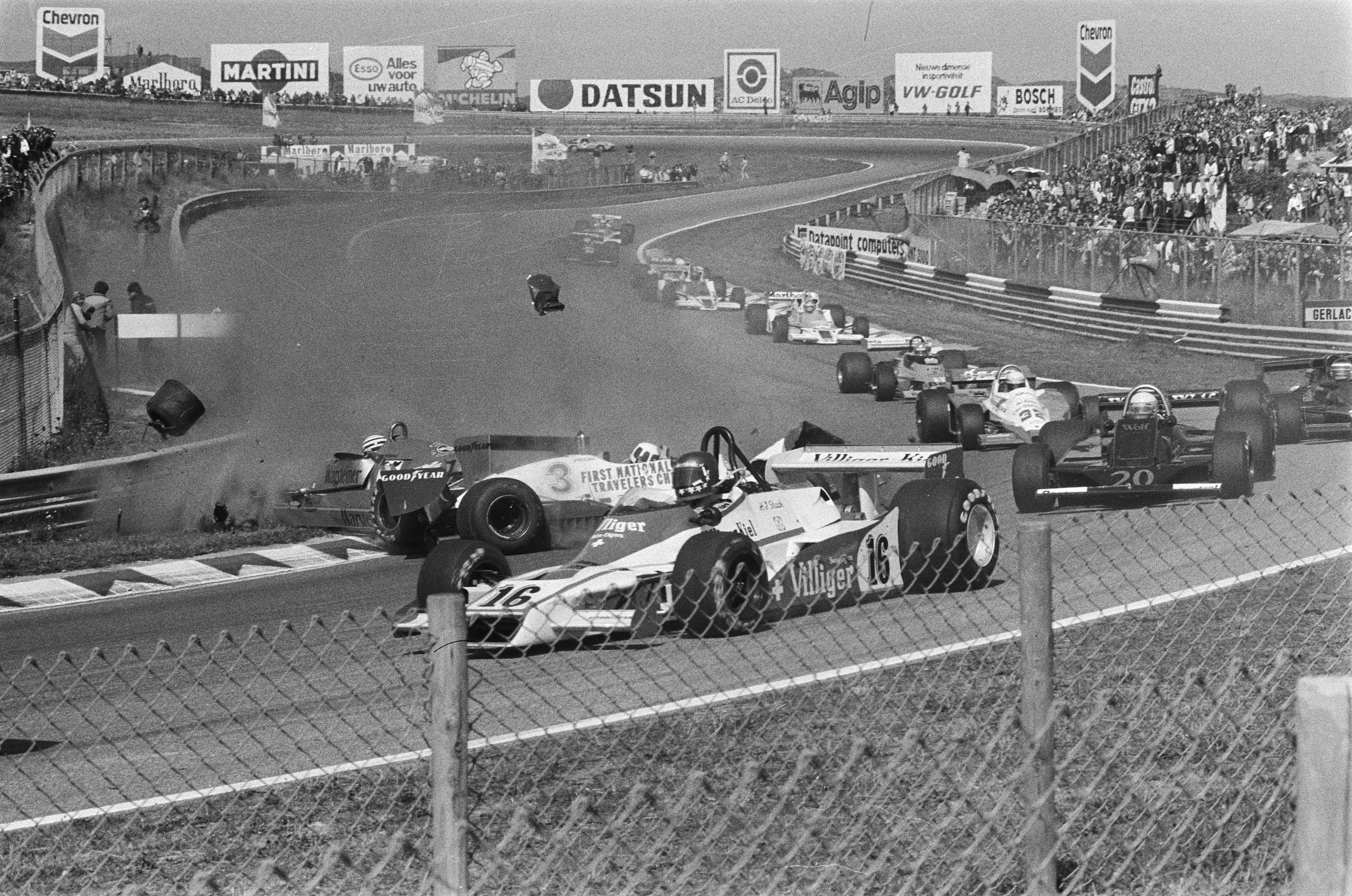
Patrese and Pironi's collision at the race start

For the fourth consecutive race, the Lotuses came 1–2 in qualifying with Mario Andretti ahead of Ronnie Peterson. Niki Lauda was third in the Brabham, ahead of the Ferraris of Carlos Reutemann and Gilles Villeneuve. The top ten was completed by Jacques Laffite in the Ligier, James Hunt in the McLaren, John Watson in the second Brabham, Jean-Pierre Jabouille in the Renault, and Emerson Fittipaldi in the Fittipaldi.

At the start of the race, Andretti led from Peterson with Laffite charging up to third, while at the second corner Didier Pironi's Tyrrell collided with Riccardo Patrese's Arrows. Thereafter, the race was relatively uneventful, Peterson dutifully following Andretti while Laffite fell back down the order, enabling Lauda to reclaim third. At the end, Andretti was just over three-tenths of a second ahead of Peterson, with Lauda a further 12 seconds back; the minor points went to Watson, Fittipaldi and Villeneuve.

This fourth 1–2 finish of the season for Lotus meant that, with three races left to run, only Andretti or Peterson could take the Drivers' Championship. It would go to Andretti in the next race at Monza, when Peterson crashed fatally.

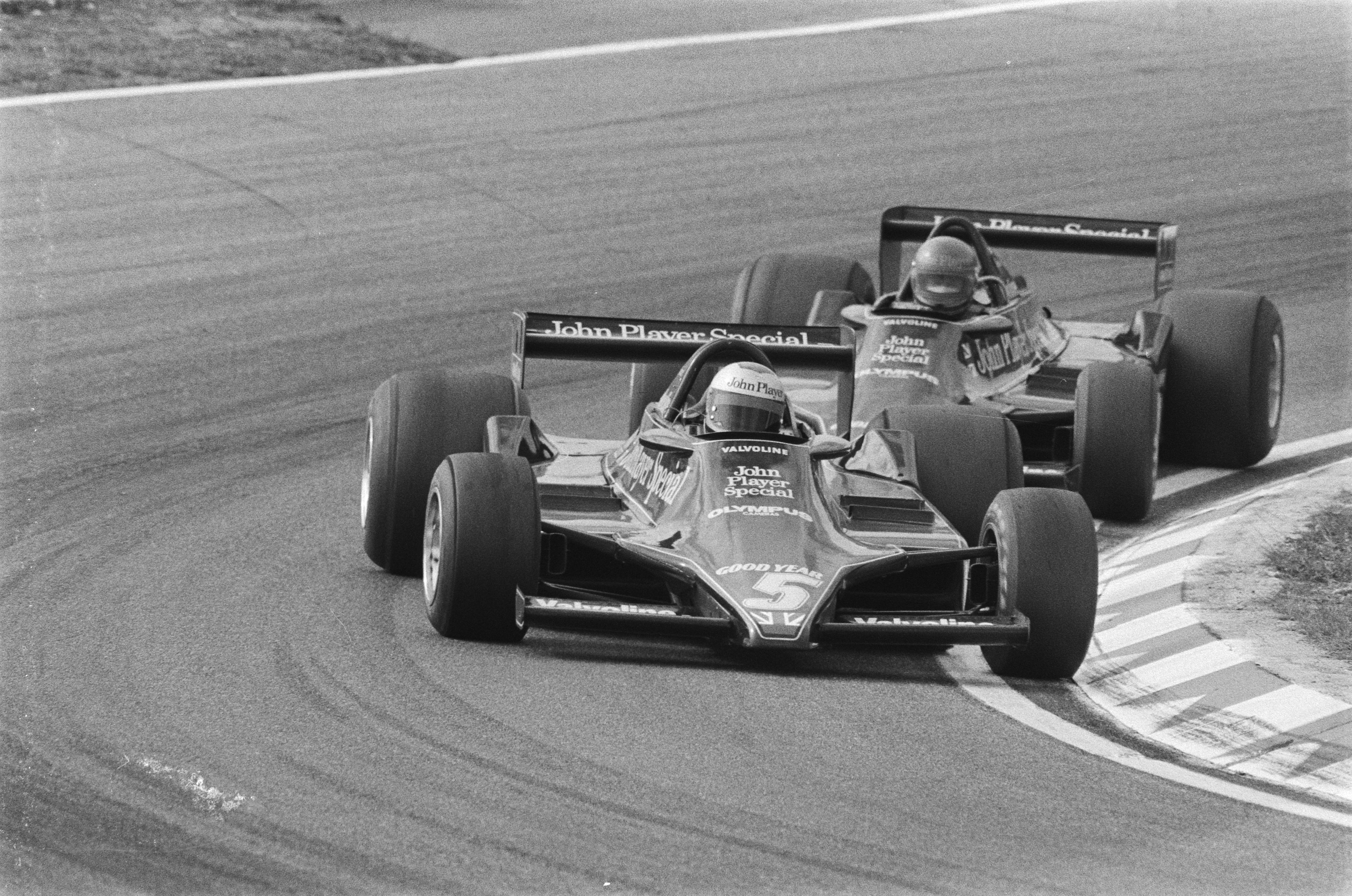
Andretti (front) and Peterson at the 1978 Dutch Grand Prix

== Classification ==
=== Pre-qualifying ===
Pos	No	Driver	Constructor	Time	Gap
1	33	(Italy) Bruno Giacomelli	McLaren-Ford	1:19.59	—
2	30	(United States) Brett Lunger	McLaren-Ford	1:20.01	+0.42
3	37	(Italy) Arturo Merzario	Merzario-Ford	1:20.32	+0.73
4	32	(Finland) Keke Rosberg	Wolf-Ford	1:20.46	+0.87
5	29	(Brazil) Nelson Piquet	McLaren-Ford	1:20.52	+0.93
6	31	(France) René Arnoux	Martini-Ford	1:20.52	+0.93
7	25	(Mexico) Héctor Rebaque	Lotus-Ford	1:20.95	+1.36
8	23	(Austria) Harald Ertl	Ensign-Ford	1:21.00	+1.41
9	39	(United States) Danny Ongais	Shadow-Ford	1:21.41	+1.82
10	36	(West Germany) Rolf Stommelen	Arrows-Ford	1:22.24	+2.65

*Positions in red indicate entries that failed to pre-qualify.

=== Qualifying ===
Pos.	Driver	Constructor	Time/Gap
1	(United States) Mario Andretti	Lotus–Ford	1:16.36
2	(Sweden) Ronnie Peterson	Lotus–Ford	+0.61
3	(Austria) Niki Lauda	Brabham–Alfa Romeo	+0.97
4	(Argentina) Carlos Reutemann	Ferrari	+0.98
5	(Canada) Gilles Villeneuve	Ferrari	+1.18
6	(France) Jacques Laffite	Ligier–Matra	+1.19
7	(United Kingdom) James Hunt	McLaren–Ford	+1.31
8	(United Kingdom) John Watson	Brabham–Alfa Romeo	+1.37
9	(France) Jean-Pierre Jabouille	Renault	+1.92
10	(Brazil) Emerson Fittipaldi	Fittipaldi–Ford	+1.94
11	(Australia) Alan Jones	Williams–Ford	+2.06
12	(France) Patrick Depailler	Tyrrell–Ford	+2.07
13	(Italy) Riccardo Patrese	Arrows–Ford	+2.14
14	(France) Patrick Tambay	McLaren–Ford	+2.14
15	(South Africa) Jody Scheckter	Wolf–Ford	+2.21
16	(Republic of Ireland) Derek Daly	Ensign–Ford	+3.03
17	(France) Didier Pironi	Tyrrell–Ford	+3.23
18	(West Germany) Hans-Joachim Stuck	Shadow–Ford	+3.26
19	(Italy) Bruno Giacomelli	McLaren–Ford	+3.47
20	(Mexico) Héctor Rebaque	Lotus–Ford	+3.66
21	(United States) Brett Lunger	McLaren–Ford	+3.67
22	(Italy) Vittorio Brambilla	Surtees–Ford	+3.90
23	(France) René Arnoux	Martini–Ford	+3.95
24	(Finland) Keke Rosberg	Wolf–Ford	+4.11
25	(United Kingdom) Rupert Keegan	Surtees–Ford	+4.16
26	(Brazil) Nelson Piquet	McLaren–Ford	+4.28
27	(Italy) Arturo Merzario	Merzario–Ford	+4.28
28	(Switzerland) Clay Regazzoni	Shadow–Ford	+4.33
29	(Netherlands) Michael Bleekemolen	ATS–Ford	+4.97
30	(West Germany) Jochen Mass	ATS–Ford	+5.46

*Positions in red indicate entries that failed to qualify.

=== Race ===
Pos	No	Driver	Constructor	Tyre	Laps	Time/Retired	Grid	Points
1	5	(United States) Mario Andretti	Lotus-Ford	G	75	1:41:04.23	1	9
2	6	(Sweden) Ronnie Peterson	Lotus-Ford	G	75	+0.32	2	6
3	1	(Austria) Niki Lauda	Brabham-Alfa Romeo	G	75	+12.21	3	4
4	2	(United Kingdom) John Watson	Brabham-Alfa Romeo	G	75	+20.92	8	3
5	14	(Brazil) Emerson Fittipaldi	Fittipaldi-Ford	G	75	+21.50	10	2
6	12	(Canada) Gilles Villeneuve	Ferrari	MI	75	+45.95	5	1
7	11	(Argentina) Carlos Reutemann	Ferrari	MI	75	+1:00.52	4	
8	26	(France) Jacques Laffite	Ligier-Matra	G	74	+1 lap	6	
9	8	(France) Patrick Tambay	McLaren-Ford	G	74	+1 lap	14	
10	7	(United Kingdom) James Hunt	McLaren-Ford	G	74	+1 lap	7	
11	25	(Mexico) Héctor Rebaque	Lotus-Ford	G	74	+1 lap	20	
12	20	(South Africa) Jody Scheckter	Wolf-Ford	G	73	+2 laps	15	
Ret	33	(Italy) Bruno Giacomelli	McLaren-Ford	G	60	Spun off	19	
Ret	16	(West Germany) Hans-Joachim Stuck	Shadow-Ford	G	56	Transmission	18	
Ret	31	(France) René Arnoux	Martini-Ford	G	40	Chassis	23	
Ret	37	(Italy) Arturo Merzario	Merzario-Ford	G	40	Engine	26	
DSQ	19	(Italy) Vittorio Brambilla	Surtees-Ford	G	37	Pushed at start	22	
Ret	15	(France) Jean-Pierre Jabouille	Renault	MI	35	Engine	9	
Ret	30	(United States) Brett Lunger	McLaren-Ford	G	35	Engine	21	
Ret	32	(Finland) Keke Rosberg	Wolf-Ford	G	21	Accident	24	
Ret	27	(Australia) Alan Jones	Williams-Ford	G	17	Throttle	11	
Ret	29	(Brazil) Nelson Piquet	McLaren-Ford	G	16	Transmission	25	
Ret	4	(France) Patrick Depailler	Tyrrell-Ford	G	13	Engine	12	
Ret	22	(Republic of Ireland) Derek Daly	Ensign-Ford	G	10	Transmission	16	
Ret	35	(Italy) Riccardo Patrese	Arrows-Ford	G	0	Accident	13	
Ret	3	(France) Didier Pironi	Tyrrell-Ford	G	0	Accident	17	
DNS	18	(United Kingdom) Rupert Keegan	Surtees-Ford	G		Injury		
DNQ	17	(Switzerland) Clay Regazzoni	Shadow-Ford	G				
DNQ	10	(Netherlands) Michael Bleekemolen	ATS-Ford	G				
DNQ	9	(West Germany) Jochen Mass	ATS-Ford	G				
DNPQ	23	(Austria) Harald Ertl	Ensign-Ford	G				
DNPQ	39	(United States) Danny Ongais	Shadow-Ford	G				
DNPQ	36	(West Germany) Rolf Stommelen	Arrows-Ford	G				

== Championship standings after the race ==
Drivers' Championship standings

	Pos	Driver	Points
	1	(United States) **Mario Andretti***	63
	2	(Sweden) **Ronnie Peterson***	51
2	3	(Austria) Niki Lauda	35
1	4	(France) Patrick Depailler	32
1	5	(Argentina) Carlos Reutemann	31

Constructors' Championship standings

	Pos	Constructor	Points
	1	(United Kingdom) **Lotus-Ford**	85
	2	(United Kingdom) Brabham-Alfa Romeo	44
1	3	(Italy) Ferrari	36
1	4	(United Kingdom) Tyrrell-Ford	36
	5	(France) Ligier-Matra	16

- Note: Only the top five positions are included for both sets of standings.
- Bold text indicates the 1978 World Constructors' Champion.
- Competitors marked in bold and with an asterisk still had a theoretical chance of becoming World Champion.

Previous race: 1978 Austrian Grand Prix	FIA Formula One World Championship; 1978 season	Next race: 1978 Italian Grand Prix
Previous race: 1977 Dutch Grand Prix	Dutch Grand Prix	Next race: 1979 Dutch Grand Prix
