= Desiré Wilson =

South African racing driver (born 1953)

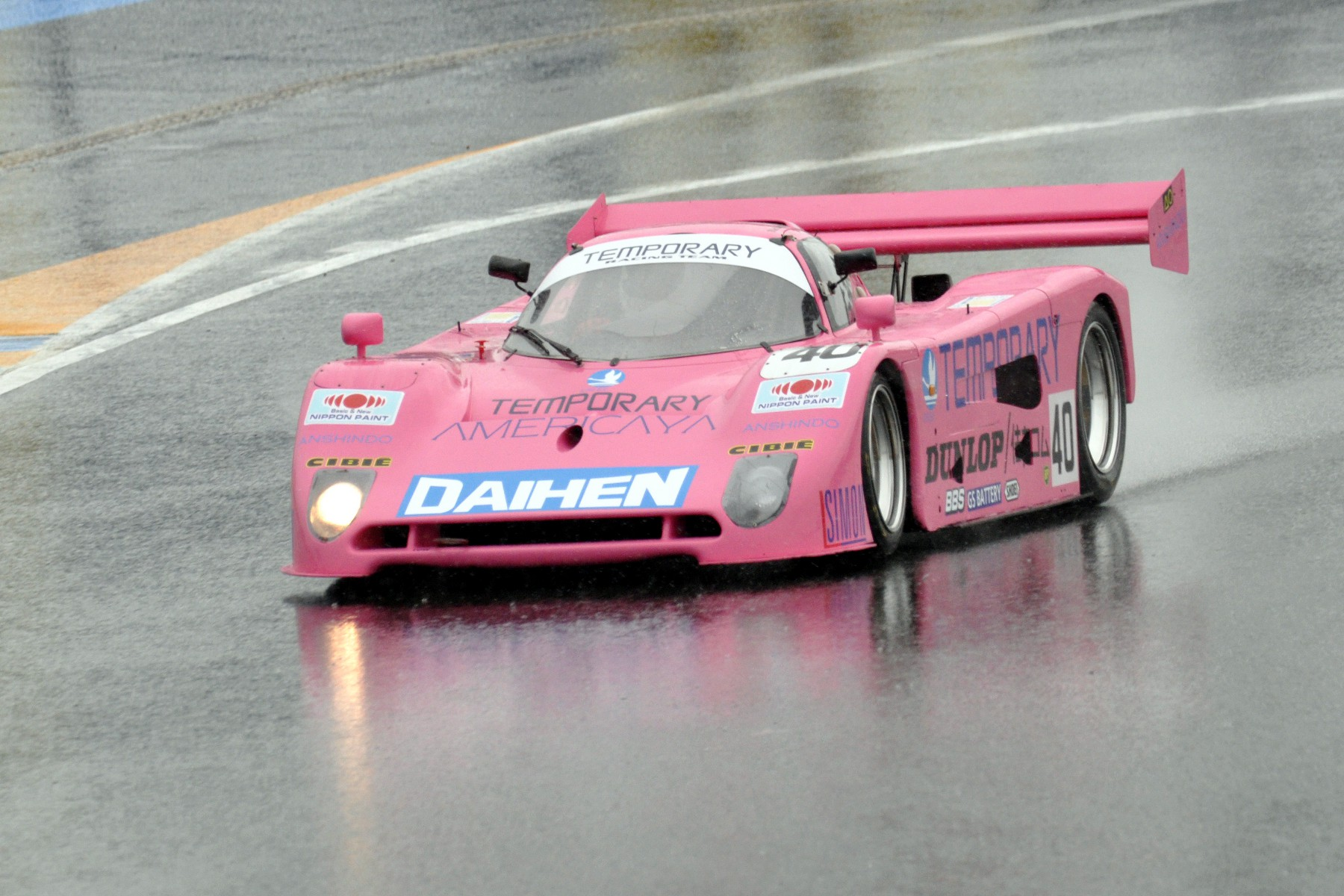
- The Spice SE90C of Desiré Wilson, Cathy Muller and Lyn St. James at the 1991 24 Hours of Le Mans
- Born: 26 November 1953 (age 72); Brakpan, Transvaal, Union of South Africa

Formula One World Championship career
- Nationality: (South Africa) South African
- Active years: 1980
- Team: non-works Williams
- Entries: 1 (0 starts)
- Championships: 0
- Wins: 0
- Podiums: 0
- Career points: 0
- Pole positions: 0
- Fastest laps: 0
- First entry: 1980 British Grand Prix

Desiré Wilson (née Randall), born 26 November 1953, is a former racing driver from South Africa and one of only five women to have competed in Formula One. Born in Brakpan, she entered one Formula One World Championship Grand Prix in 1980 with a non-works RAM Racing-prepared Williams FW07, but failed to qualify. She also raced in the 1981 non-world championship South African Grand Prix in a one off deal with Tyrrell Racing. This race was not part of the 1981 World Championship due, in part, to the FISA–FOCA war. She qualified 16th and, after the car stalled during the start of the race, she moved up through the field in wet conditions; as conditions dried, she fell back and damaged the car when it touched a wall while she was letting the race leader through.

Wilson became the only woman to win a Formula One race of any kind when she won at Brands Hatch in the short-lived British Aurora F1 Championship in 1980. As a result of this achievement, she has a grandstand at Brands Hatch named after her. Following her attempts in Formula One, Wilson participated in other disciplines including CART and sports car racing. Wilson entered the Indianapolis 500 three times in 1982, 1983, and 1984, but failed to qualify for any.

== Career ==
To date, Wilson is the only woman to have been licensed to drive in both CART Indycars and FIA Formula One World Championship. In 1980, she won both the Monza 1000km and the Silverstone 6 Hours World Championship for Makes races, thereby becoming the first woman to have claimed outright victories in any FIA World Championship race.

In 1967, at the age of twelve, Wilson came second in the South African nationals, driving midget cars. By 1972, she had made her full racing debut and was fourth in her first season of the South African Formula Vee Championship. After two more seasons on the Formula Vee circuit, finishing fourth and second respectively, Wilson decided to pursue the international acclaim associated with Formula One. She won the South African Formula Ford Championship in 1975 and defended the title the following season, as well as securing the "Driver to Europe" award. As a result, Wilson moved to Europe for the 1977 season, competing mainly in Formula Ford 2000 races, in the Benelux and British Championships, where she finished third and fourth respectively, winning races at Zandvoort and Colmar-Berg.

Wilson took another huge step forward in 1978, racing a Formula One March 751, updated to 761 specifications. After impressing many team bosses, she signed up to race in the Aurora AFX F1 Championship for Mario Deliotti Racing. Driving their Cosworth-powered Ensign N175, her best finish was a third place at the Thruxton Circuit. As her knowledge of the European tracks improved, so did her results. Whilst racing F1, she still drove a Lola T490 in the British Sports 2000 Championship, despite it being a minor national championship.

In 1979, Wilson became the first woman to lead an F1 race. She headed the field at Zolder for Melchester Racing, in their Tyrrell 008, although she spun in the wet on the penultimate lap, but fought back to finish third, whilst claiming the fastest lap of the race. In addition, Wilson took three more third places at Oulton Park, Brands Hatch and Thruxton. She ended the season in seventh place. She continued to race in Sports 2000, finishing third in the championship with her Lola.

1980 was to be Wilson's big year, although it started sponsor-less, racing Formula Pacific in New Zealand. Teddy Yip and his Theodore Racing team came to her rescue, giving her a Wolf WR4 for the Aurora series. Yip's faith was repaid by round two, when Wilson won the Evening News Trophy at Brands Hatch, beating Norman Dickson and Eliseo Salazar. In doing so, she became the first woman, and so far the only woman to win an F1 race. She recorded two more podium finishes, a fine second place at Thruxton and a third at Mallory Park, before her team ran out of money.

Wilson's successes did not stop there in 1980, when she formed a partnership with Alain de Cadenet and shared the driving duties of his De Cadenet LM1. After an impressive outing where the pair took third in the Brands Hatch 1000km, the pair went on the win both the Monza 1000km and the Silverstone 6 Hours races.

Wilson's victories drew the attention of John Macdonald and his F1 RAM Racing team. During a private test at Brands Hatch, driving a year-old Williams FW07, things looked promising, where she was twelfth overall. However, by the weekend of the British Grand Prix, the car had been replaced with an inferior model, which she had been beaten in several times in the Aurora AFX series. The car lacked aerodynamics modifications, and her lack of experience at this level meant she did not qualify.

This run of bad luck did not stop at Brands Hatch; after a practice accident for the 1980 24 Hours of Le Mans, Wilson and de Cadenet were not allowed to start in view of this earlier incident, despite setting eighth fastest lap in qualifying.

Wilson got the chance to redeem herself, when she accepted a drive with Tyrrell Racing for her home Grand Prix. However, the ongoing FISA–FOCA war within F1, led to the 1981 South African Grand Prix being a non-championship race, which nevertheless still attracted a strong field. Wilson qualified 16th, moved through the field to sixth before spinning out her Tyrrell 010, with gearbox troubles. But, she had managed to impress Ken Tyrrell, and was offered further drives. Due to lack of sponsorship and political situation, she was unable to take up Tyrrell's offer and the drive went to Ricardo Zunino, and then Michele Alboreto. The remainder of the season consisted of outing in Formula Atlantic and Sportscars.

Sportscars now became Wilson's main focus, after finished eighth in the 1981 Brands Hatch 1000km. In 1982, she raced in the IMSA series, failing to finish any races. A trip to France, for the Le Mans 24 hours did not fare any better, with her Grid S1, lasting only 24 minutes before the engine expired. Her only result of 1982 came in the 1982 Brands Hatch 1000km, when she finished fourth with Jonathan Palmer aboard a works Ford C100.

Wilson's career in American single-seaters started in 1982. Back with Teddy Yip's Theodore Racing, she passed her Indianapolis 500 rookie test without a problem, and during qualifying set the fastest ever lap by a female racer (191.042 mph). However, she failed to qualify for the event due to repeated engine failures and the early ending of the qualifying session in which her team-mate, Gordon Smiley, was killed. She returned the following year, but failed to qualify again. Meanwhile, she did race eight other Indycar races, with a best finish of tenth in the Grand Prix of Cleveland. Her finishing record with Wysard Racing was poor, though not always due to driver error. She was an impressive novice, especially considering her rapid recovery from a broken leg suffered in a terrifying crash in an IMSA race at Brainerd International Raceway. During the race, her Momo Corse March 83G's front suspension broke. Three weeks later, she was back in an Indycar. A third attempt in qualifying for the Indy 500, in 1984 also resulted in a DNQ.

During this time, sportscars had definitely not been forgotten. Wilson competed around the world in various series and cars, scoring some decent results in the process, but the highlight of 1983 was her 7th place at Le Mans, sharing an Obermaier Racing entered Porsche 956 with Axel Plankenhorn and Jürgen Lässig. With the help of these Germans, she finally broke her major-race duck with an excellent result. A return to Brands Hatch for the 1984 1000 km race, saw her take the Kremer Racing's Porsche 956 to fourth place, with the help of David Sutherland and fellow South African, George Fouché.

Although her international racing schedule started to thin out, Wilson's competitive spirit remained and in 1987, as she took a class win in the SCCA/Escort Endurance Challenge at Sears Point, sharing a Saleen Mustang with Lisa Cacares. While with Saleen Motorsport, she took a class win Sebring 6 hours alongside Scott Pruett, assisting Saleen to the constructors' title. After a few more outings in Porsche 962C's in Britain and Japan, she had one last shot at Le Mans in 1991 in a Spice SE90C. This all-female crew, with co-drivers Lyn St. James and Cathy Muller, lasted only 47 laps before crashing out.

Although Wilson returned to race a Mazda Xedos in the North American Super Touring Car Championship in 1997, she now only occasionally races at the Goodwood Revival.

== Personal life ==
Wilson is married to fellow South African and road course architect Alan Wilson.

== Racing record ==
=== Career summary ===
| Season | Series | Team | Races | Wins | Poles | F/Laps | Podiums | Points | Position |
|---|---|---|---|---|---|---|---|---|---|
| 1973 | South African Formula Vee Championship | | ? | ? | ? | ? | ? | ? | 4th |
| 1974 | South African Formula Vee Championship | | ? | ? | ? | ? | ? | ? | **2nd** |
| 1975 | South African Formula Ford Championship | | ? | ? | ? | ? | ? | ? | **1st** |
| 1976 | South African Formula Ford Championship | | ? | ? | ? | ? | ? | ? | **1st** |
| 1977 | Benelux Formula Ford 2000 Championship | | ? | ? | ? | ? | ? | ? | **3rd** |
| 1977 | Dutch Formula Ford 2000 Championship | | ? | ? | ? | ? | ? | ? | **3rd** |
| 1977 | British Formula Ford 2000 Championship | | ? | ? | ? | ? | ? | ? | **3rd** |
| 1978 | USAC Mini-Indy Series | | 1 | 0 | 0 | 0 | 0 | 2 | 69th |
| 1978 | Aurora AFX F1 Championship | Mario Deliotti Racing | 5 | 0 | 0 | 0 | 1 | 34 | 10th |
| 1979 | Aurora AFX F1 Championship | Melchester Racing | 15 | 0 | 0 | 1 | 4 | 28 | 7th |
| 1980 | Aurora AFX F1 Championship | Theodore Racing Hong Kong | 6 | 1 | 0 | 2 | 3 | 21 | 6th |
| 1980 | Aurora AFX F1 Championship | Colin Bennett Racing | 1 | 0 | 0 | 0 | 0 | 21 | 6th |
| 1980 | World Challenge for Endurance Drivers | Alain de Cadenet | 3 | 2 | 3 | 0 | 0 | 39 | 41st |
| 1980 | Formula One | Brands Hatch Racing | 1 | 0 | 0 | 0 | 0 | 0 | NC |
| 1980 | Macau Grand Prix | Susie Racing | 1 | 0 | 0 | 0 | 0 | N/A | 6th |
| 1980 | Aurora AFX New Zealand International Formula Pacific Series | | 8 | 0 | 0 | 0 | 0 | 0 | NC |
| 1981 | MCD British Formula Atlantic Championship | Goodwin Racing | 1 | 0 | 0 | 0 | 0 | 3 | 15th |
| 1981 | World Championship for Drivers and Makes | T-Bird Swap Shop | 1 | 0 | 0 | 0 | 0 | 14 | 187th |
| 1982 | FIA World Endurance Championship | Grid Racing | 1 | 0 | 0 | 0 | 0 | 10 | 46th |
| 1982 | FIA World Endurance Championship | Ford Motor Company | 1 | 0 | 0 | 0 | 0 | 10 | 46th |
| 1983 | IMSA Camel GT Championship | Momo Corse | 1 | 0 | 0 | 0 | 0 | 0 | NC |
| 1983 | FIA World Endurance Championship | Obermaier Racing | 1 | 0 | 0 | 0 | 0 | 4 | 63rd |
| 1983 | PPG Indy Car World Series | Wysard Motor Co | 8 | 0 | 0 | 0 | 0 | 3 | 28th |
| 1984 | FIA World Endurance Championship | Kremer Racing | 1 | 0 | 0 | 0 | 0 | 10 | 44th |
| 1986 | American Racing Series | ARS | 1 | 0 | 0 | 0 | 0 | 8 | 24th |
| 1986 | PPG Indy Car World Series | Machinists Union Racing | 3 | 0 | 0 | 0 | 0 | 0 | NC |
| 1989 | All Japan Sports Prototype Car Endurance Championship | Team Davey | 1 | 0 | 0 | 0 | 0 | 0 | NC |
| 1989 | World Sports Prototype Championship | Team Davey | 1 | 0 | 0 | 0 | 0 | 0 | NC |
| 1989 | British Formula 3000 | GA Motorsport | 1 | 0 | 0 | 0 | 0 | 3 | 12th |
| 1991 | World Sports Car Championship | Euro Racing (A.O. Racing) | 1 | 0 | 0 | 0 | 0 | 0 | NC |
| 1991 | Firestone Indy Lights Championship | Leading Edge Motorsport | 1 | 0 | 0 | 0 | 0 | 1 | 24th |
| 1993 | IMSA Exxon Supreme GT Series - GTS-1 | Tom Gloy Racing | 1 | 0 | 0 | 0 | 0 | 0 | NC |
| 1997 | North American Super Touring Championship | Schader Motorsports | 3 | 0 | 0 | 0 | 0 | 18 | 15th |
| 1999 | Speedvision World Challenge - GT | Speedvision/Vortech | 1 | 0 | 0 | 0 | 0 | 0 | NC |

=== Complete British Formula One Championship results ===
(key) (Races in bold indicate pole position; races in italics indicate fastest lap)

| Year | Entrant | Chassis | Engine | 1 | 2 | 3 | 4 | 5 | 6 | 7 | 8 | 9 | 10 | 11 | 12 | 13 | 14 | 15 | Pos. | Pts |
|---|---|---|---|---|---|---|---|---|---|---|---|---|---|---|---|---|---|---|---|---|
| 1978 | Mario Deliotti Racing | Ensign N175 | Ford Cosworth DFV 3.0 V8 | OUL | BRH | SNE | MAL | ZAN | DON | THR | OUL; Ret | MAL; 6 | BRH; 4 | THR; 3 | SNE; 6 | | | | 10th | 34 |
| 1979 | Melchester Racing | Tyrrell 008 | Ford Cosworth DFV 3.0 V8 | ZOL; 3 | OUL; 3 | BRH; 3 | MAL; 11 | SNE; Ret | THR; 3 | ZAN; 4 | DON; Ret | OUL; 5 | NOG; 4 | MAL; Ret | BRH; 7 | THR; 7 | SNE; 6 | SIL; 5 | 7th | 28 |
| 1980 | Theodore Racing Hong Kong | Wolf WR4 | Ford Cosworth DFV 3.0 V8 | OUL; Ret | BRH; 1 | SIL; 8 | MAL; Ret | THR; 2 | MNZ | | | | | | | | | | 6th | 21 |
| 1980 | Theodore Racing Hong Kong | Wolf WR3 | Ford Cosworth DFV 3.0 V8 | | | | | | | MAL; 3 | SNE | | | | | | | | 6th | 21 |
| 1980 | Colin Bennett Racing | Lotus 78 | Ford Cosworth DFV 3.0 V8 | | | | | | | | | BRH; Ret | THR | OUL | SIL | | | | 6th | 21 |

=== Complete Formula One World Championship results ===
(key)

| Year | Entrant | Chassis | Engine | 1 | 2 | 3 | 4 | 5 | 6 | 7 | 8 | 9 | 10 | 11 | 12 | 13 | 14 | WDC | Pts |
|---|---|---|---|---|---|---|---|---|---|---|---|---|---|---|---|---|---|---|---|
| 1980 | Brands Hatch Racing | Williams FW07 | Ford Cosworth DFV 3.0 V8 | ARG | BRA | RSA | USW | BEL | MON | FRA | GBR; DNQ | GER | AUT | NED | ITA | CAN | USA | NC | 0 |

=== Complete Formula One Non-Championship results ===
(key)

| Year | Entrant | Chassis | Engine | 1 | 2 | 3 |
|---|---|---|---|---|---|---|
| 1979 | Melchester Racing | Tyrrell 008 | Ford Cosworth DFV 3.0 V8 | ROC; 9 | GNM | DIN |
| 1981 | Tyrrell Racing Team | Tyrrell 010 | Ford Cosworth DFV 3.0 V8 | RSA; Ret | | |

=== Complete 24 Hours of Le Mans results ===
| Year | Team | Co-Drivers | Car | Class | Laps | Pos. | Class Pos. |
|---|---|---|---|---|---|---|---|
| 1982 | (United Kingdom) Grid Racing | (Spain) Emilio de Villota (United Kingdom) Alain de Cadenet | Grid Plaza S1-Ford Cosworth | C | 7 | DNF | DNF |
| 1983 | (West Germany) Obermaier Racing | (West Germany) Axel Plankenhorn (West Germany) Jürgen Lässig | Porsche 956 | C | 347 | 7th | 7th |
| 1991 | (Netherlands) Euro Racing (Japan) A.O. Racing | (United States) Lyn St. James (France) Cathy Muller | Spice SE90C-Ford Cosworth | C1 | 47 | DNF | DNF |

=== Complete 24 Hours of Daytona results ===
| Year | Team | Co-Drivers | Car | Class | Laps | Pos. | Class Pos. |
|---|---|---|---|---|---|---|---|
| 1982 | (United States) Thunderbird Swap Shop | (United States) Preston Henn (United States) Marty Hinza | Porsche 935 | GTP | 229 | DNF | DNF |
| 1993 | (United States) Tom Gloy Racing | (Canada) Ron Fellows (Japan) Tomiko Yoshikawa (Canada) Pieter Baljet | Ford Mustang | GTS | 189 | DNF | DNF |

=== Complete 12 Hours of Sebring results ===
| Year | Team | Co-Drivers | Car | Class | Laps | Pos. | Class Pos. |
|---|---|---|---|---|---|---|---|
| 1982 | (United States) North American Racing Team | (United States) Janet Guthrie (United States) Bonnie Henn | Ferrari 512 BB | GTP | 163 | DNF | DNF |

=== American open-wheel racing results ===
==== PPG Indy Car World Series ====
| Year | Team | No. | Chassis | Engine | 1 | 2 | 3 | 4 | 5 | 6 | 7 | 8 | 9 | 10 | 11 | 12 | 13 | 14 | 15 | 16 | 17 | Pos. | Pts | Ref |
|---|---|---|---|---|---|---|---|---|---|---|---|---|---|---|---|---|---|---|---|---|---|---|---|---|
| 1983 | Wysard Motor Co | 34 | March 82C | Cosworth DFX V8t | ATL | INDY; DNQ | MIL | | | | | | | | | | | | | | | 28th | 3 | |
| 1983 | Wysard Motor Co | 34 | March 83C | Cosworth DFX V8t | | | | CLE; 10 | MCH | ROA; 20 | POC; 31 | RIV; 14 | MOH; 16 | MCH | CPL; 23 | LAG; 19 | PHX; 13 | | | | | 28th | 3 | |
| 1984 | Wysard Motor Co | 34 | March 83C | Cosworth DFX V8t | LBH; DNQ | PHX | INDY; DNQ | MIL | POR | MEA | CLE | MCH | ROA | POC | MOH | SAN | MCH | PHX | LAG | CPL | | NC | 0 | |
| 1986 | Machinists Union Racing | 55 | March 86C | Cosworth DFX V8t | PHX | LBH | INDY | MIL | POR | MEA | CLE | TOR | MCH | POC | MOH; 13 | SAN | MCH | ROA; 19 | LAG; 16 | PHX | MIA | 38th | 0 | |

==== Indianapolis 500 ====
| Year | Chassis | Engine | Start | Finish | Team |
|---|---|---|---|---|---|
| 1982 | Eagle 81 | Cosworth | DNQ | | Theodore Racing |
| 1983 | March 82C | Cosworth | DNQ | | Wysard Motor Co |
| 1984 | March 83C | Cosworth | DNQ | | Wysard Motor Co |

==== Indy Lights ====
| Year | Team | Chassis | Engine | 1 | 2 | 3 | 4 | 5 | 6 | 7 | 8 | 9 | 10 | 11 | 12 | Pos. | Pts |
|---|---|---|---|---|---|---|---|---|---|---|---|---|---|---|---|---|---|
| 1986 | ARS | March 86A | Buick 4.2 V6 | PHX; 6 | MIL | MEA | TOR | POC | MOH | ROA | LAG | PHX | MIA | | | 24th | 8 |
| 1991 | Leading Edge Motorsport | March 86A | Buick 4.2 V6 | LBH | PHX | MIL | DET | POR | CLE | MEA | TOR | DEN; 12 | MOH | NAZ | LAG | 24th | 1 |

=== North American Touring Car Championship ===
(key)

North American Touring Car Championship results
| Year | Team | No. | Car | 1 | 2 | 3 | 4 | 5 | 6 | 7 | 8 | 9 | 10 | 11 | 12 | 13 | 14 | 15 | 16 | 17 | 18 | NATCC | Pts |
|---|---|---|---|---|---|---|---|---|---|---|---|---|---|---|---|---|---|---|---|---|---|---|---|
| 1997 | Schader Motorsports | 6 | Mazda Xedos 6 | LBH; 6 | LBH; 10 | SAV; DNS | SAV; DNS | DET | DET | PIR | PIR | CLE | CLE | TOR; 11 | TOR; DNS | MOH | MOH | VAN | VAN | LS | LS | 15th | 18 |

== See also ==
- List of female Formula One drivers
