= Jody Scheckter =

South African racing driver (born 1950)

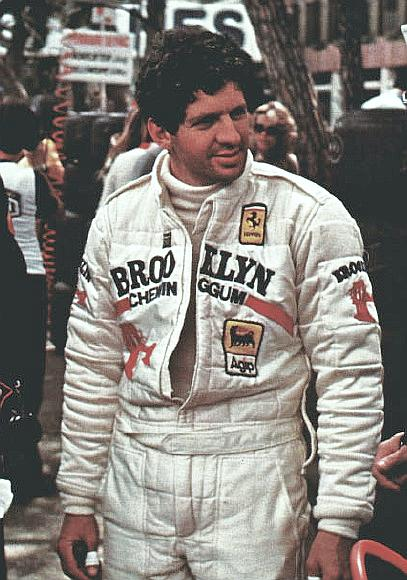
- Scheckter at the 1979 Monaco Grand Prix
- Born: Jody David Scheckter; 29 January 1950 (age 76); East London, Eastern Cape, Union of South Africa
- Spouses: Pamela Bailey; Clare Fawkes
- Children: 6, including Toby and Tomas
- Relatives: Ian Scheckter (brother)

Formula One World Championship career
- Nationality: (South Africa) South African
- Active years: 1972–1980
- Team(s): McLaren, Tyrrell, Wolf, Ferrari
- Entries: 113 (112 starts)
- Championships: 1 (1979)
- Wins: 10
- Podiums: 33
- Career points: 246 (255) (Note: Up until 1990, not all points scored by a driver contributed to their final World Championship tally (see list of points scoring systems for more information). Numbers without parentheses are Championship points; numbers in parentheses are total points scored.)
- Pole positions: 3
- Fastest laps: 5
- First entry: 1972 United States Grand Prix
- First win: 1974 Swedish Grand Prix
- Last win: 1979 Italian Grand Prix
- Last entry: 1980 United States Grand Prix

Jody David Scheckter (/ˈʃɛktər/; born 29 January 1950) is a South African former racing driver and businessman who competed in Formula One from 1972 to 1980. Scheckter won the Formula One World Drivers' Championship in 1979 with Ferrari, and remains the only African driver to have won a Formula One Grand Prix or the World Drivers' Championship; he won 10 Grands Prix across nine seasons.

Born and raised in East London, Cape Province, Scheckter rapidly ascended through the ranks of motor racing upon moving to the United Kingdom in 1971. His Formula One debut came the following year at the United States Grand Prix, driving for McLaren, who he had raced for that year in British and European Formula Two. Amongst winning the SCCA Continental Championship in Formula 5000, Scheckter entered a further five Grands Prix in 1973 with McLaren. Scheckter earned a full-time drive with Tyrrell the following season, taking his maiden win at the Swedish Grand Prix and finishing third in the championship. Scheckter won his home Grand Prix in South Africa in 1975 and placed third in the standings again in 1976, driving the six-wheeled P34; he remains the only driver to win a Grand Prix on six wheels.

Moving to Wolf in 1977, Scheckter took several race wins—including the Monaco Grand Prix—as he finished runner-up to Niki Lauda in the standings. After a winless season for Wolf in 1978, Scheckter moved to Ferrari to partner Gilles Villeneuve. Winning three Grands Prix in his first season for Ferrari, Scheckter clinched the title with his victory at the Italian Grand Prix, becoming the first World Drivers' Champion from Africa. He was unable to defend his title in 1980 as Ferrari struggled with the 312T5, retiring at the end of the season having achieved 10 race wins, three pole positions, five fastest laps and 33 podiums in Formula One.

Upon retiring from motor racing, Scheckter worked as a broadcaster for CBS, ABC and ITV. He founded a weapons simulation business in 1984 called Firearms Training Systems, whose revenue eclipsed £100 million by the early 1990s. Scheckter then moved into organic farming, owning Laverstoke Park Farm in England. His sons Toby and Tomas are both racing drivers.

== Career ==
Jody David Scheckter was born on 29 January 1950 in East London, Cape Province, Union of South Africa, and educated at Vincent Primary School (East London) and Selborne College

=== Formula One ===
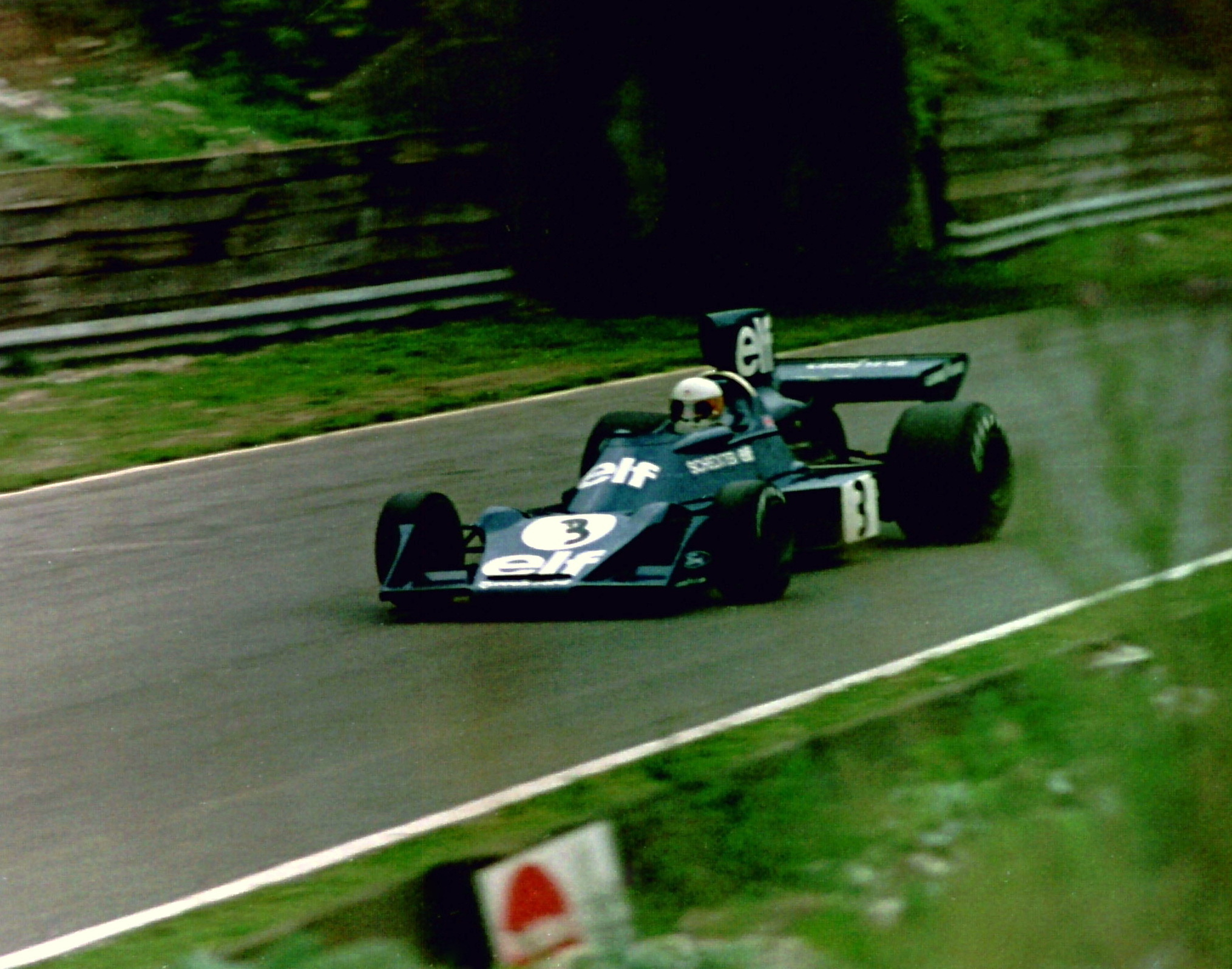
Scheckter in a Tyrrell 007 at the 1974 British Grand Prix at Brands Hatch.

==== 1972–1973: Debut years ====
Scheckter rapidly ascended to the ranks of Formula One after moving to Britain in early 1971. His Formula 1 debut occurred at the US Grand Prix at Watkins Glen in 1972 with McLaren, where he ran as high as third place before spinning and finishing ninth. Immediately becoming a name to watch, he continued his development the following year, winning the 1973 SCCA L&M Championship and racing five times in F1. In France, he almost won in only his third start in F1 before crashing into Emerson Fittipaldi, the reigning World Champion, who said after the crash about Scheckter: "This madman is a menace to himself and everybody else and does not belong in Formula 1." In his next start, the British Grand Prix at Silverstone, Scheckter's spin triggered a major accident which took nearly a dozen cars out of the race. The Grand Prix Drivers Association demanded his immediate banishment, which was only put off when McLaren agreed to rest their driver for four races. Scheckter's McLaren M23 bore the number zero during the Canadian and American Grands Prix of 1973. Scheckter is one of only two F1 drivers to compete under this number, the other being Damon Hill. During the practice for the American event at the Watkins Glen circuit, Frenchman François Cevert, who was due to be Scheckter's Tyrrell teammate for 1974, was killed in an appalling accident at the fast uphill Esses corners. Scheckter was behind Cevert when he crashed, and he stopped his McLaren, got out of his car and attempted to help Cevert out of his destroyed Tyrrell, but the 29-year-old Frenchman had been cut in half by the circuit's poorly installed Armco barriers and was already dead. Witnessing Cevert's dreadful accident left an indelible mark on the South African and caused him to abandon his reckless ways, becoming a more mature and calculating driver as a result.

==== 1974–1976: Tyrrell years ====
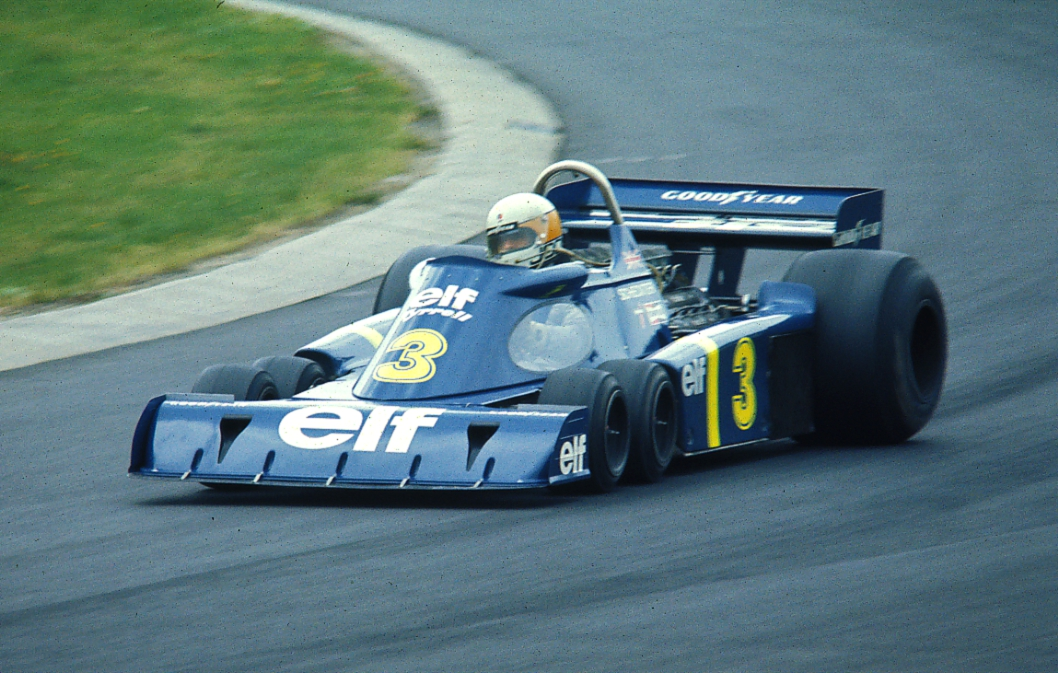
Scheckter in the iconic six-wheel Tyrrell P34 at the Nürburgring in 1976.

Tyrrell gave Scheckter his first full-time drive in F1, signing him for the 1974 season. After failing to score from the first three rounds with the 006 model, a switch to the 007 chassis rewarded Scheckter with his first points finish at the Spanish Grand Prix. Despite a collision with Tom Pryce, Scheckter finished third in Belgium, thus scoring his maiden F1 podium. Having finished second in Monaco, Scheckter passed polesitting teammate Patrick Depailler at the start of the Swedish Grand Prix and held on to win the race. He scored top fives in the next two events, before benefiting from a puncture for Niki Lauda's Ferrari to win in Britain and take over the championship lead. Scheckter finished second in Germany but retired early in Austria with a blown engine. Scheckter profited from reliability woes for the two Ferraris to finish third in Italy, a result that took him to within a point of standings leader Clay Regazzoni. His championship challenge suffered a bitter blow in Canada; running third, Scheckter crashed after the race's halfway mark due to a brake failure. Though he was still eligible to win the title at the season finale at Watkins Glen, Scheckter retired with a fuel pressure problem while holding off eventual champion Emerson Fittipaldi in fourth place. Scheckter finished third in the championship.

Scheckter's 1975 began with two non-scores; he finished 11th in Argentina after colliding with Jochen Mass at the start, then retired in Brazil with an oil tank issue. At his home race in South Africa, Scheckter won in emphatic fashion, passing Carlos Pace for the lead on lap 3 and leading every lap from thereon. In Spain, Scheckter suffered an early engine failure, whilst a puncture demoted him from a points position in Monaco. Scheckter worked his way to second in Belgium, though he failed to score points in the subsequent three races. This included a strong run at Zandvoort, where a potential third place was scuppered by a late engine failure. During the final laps of a weather-affected British Grand Prix, Scheckter went off, but was nevertheless credited with third place as the race was red flagged and the countback rule was applied. A horrible race followed at the Nürburgring, as Scheckter dropped from third to 20th at the start and later crashed out due to a tire failure. Eighth places in Austria and Italy, where Scheckter spun from third on lap 2, preceded a final points score with sixth in the United States. With just four points finishes across the season, Scheckter dropped to seventh in the standings.

Having started 1976 with two points finishes from the opening four races, Scheckter and teammate Depailler switched to Tyrrell's radical, six-wheeled Tyrrell P34. After finishing fourth in Belgium, Scheckter gave the six-wheeler its maiden podium in Monaco (a second place), as well as its only win at the Swedish Grand Prix. He then finished second in two successive races in Britain and Germany. A crash caused by a broken suspension ended his race in Austria, though Scheckter returned to the top five in the next three events. At the United States Grand Prix, Scheckter battled James Hunt for the victory all race, but eventually came up short and took second. Despite retiring with overheating problems in Japan, Scheckter had done enough to end the year third overall. Despite scoring points in ten of the 12 races he contested with the P34, Scheckter later went on record as saying the car was "a piece of junk" and left the team after 1976.

==== 1977–1978: Walter Wolf Racing ====
Scheckter joined the new Walter Wolf Racing team in 1977. At its maiden race in Argentina, Scheckter benefited from reliability issues for his rivals to claim victory. Engine issues stopped his race early in Brazil, though Scheckter bounced back by taking second in South Africa. Scheckter took the lead at the start of the United States Grand Prix West, but was passed by Mario Andretti in the closing stages, having felt a deflating front right tyre; he nevertheless finished third. Third in Spain preceded a win in Monaco, where Scheckter passed John Watson off the line and led every lap. Scheckter led the Belgian Grand Prix early on, but fell back after pitting for dry tyres later than his rivals on the drying track. He later retired with engine problems. In Sweden, Scheckter retired after colliding with second-placed Watson in an attempt to overtake. He then crashed out on his own in France. Scheckter's fourth successive retirement came in Britain, where an engine failure took him out of third place. Scheckter took pole for the German Grand Prix, and finished second after losing out to Niki Lauda in a battle for the lead. At the following race in Austria, Scheckter spun out, thus handing Lauda a 16-point championship advantage. Lauda extended the gap to 21 points with a win in the Netherlands, while Scheckter inherited third after Patrick Tambay ran out of fuel on the penultimate lap. Another blow to Scheckter's title chances came in Monza, the South African retiring from second place with another engine failure. Even though Scheckter finished third at Watkins Glen, Lauda had done enough to clinch the title two races in advance. Luck found Scheckter at the penultimate race in Canada, where an engine failure for the dominant Andretti handed him and Wolf their third win of the season. Scheckter concluded the year by finishing tenth in Japan; he finished second in the championship thanks to nine podiums.

By the start of the 1978 season, Walter Wolf's race team had become less competitive, the car having to be rebuilt after finishing a lowly tenth in Argentina. Scheckter retired from the next three races: he bent his suspension after colliding with Patrick Tambay in Brazil. He then spun out of his home Grand Prix after sliding with low engine power caused by a fuel injection pressure drop-off, having previously led the race before falling to sixth. Finally, Scheckter collided with Tambay while defending fifth place at Long Beach. Scheckter collected his first points with a third place finish at Monaco, where he nursed the car home despite breaking second gear with three laps to go. In Belgium, startline contact with Lauda led to Scheckter having to retire later on. Using the new Wolf WR5, Scheckter finished fourth in Spain but retired with water pipe issues in Sweden. He took sixth in France, then led the British Grand Prix before developing a gearbox issue which dropped him out. Scheckter qualified fourth in Germany but fell to the back with fuel-feed problems; he battled back to finish a strong second. In the heavy rain at Spielberg, Scheckter crashed out on lap 4, having previously run second. After finishing 12th at Zandvoort and Monza, Scheckter claimed third at the United States Grand Prix. Scheckter concluded the season in strong fashion, qualifying second in Canada and, after being passed by a fast Gilles Villeneuve, finishing second. With seventh place in the championship, Scheckter left Wolf to join Villeneuve at Ferrari.

==== 1979–1980: Championship and retirement ====
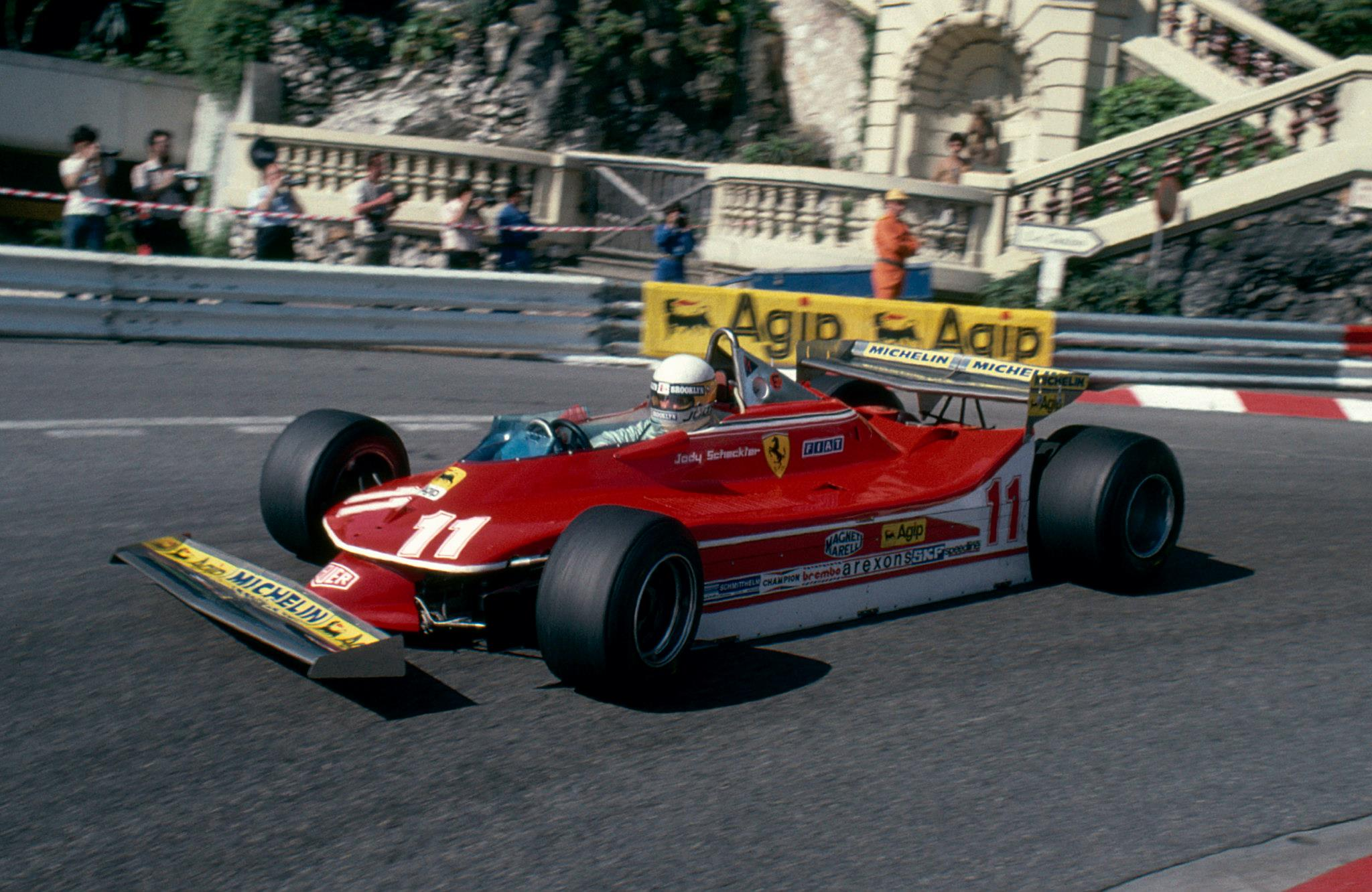
Scheckter driving for Ferrari at the 1979 Monaco Grand Prix.

Scheckter's 1979 began badly, as he sprained his wrist in a lap 1 collision with John Watson. After pitting for new tyres, Scheckter finished sixth in Brazil, the last race of the Ferrari 312T3 chassis. Once the 312T4 was introduced in South Africa, Ferrari scored a 1-2, with Villeneuve leading home Scheckter. The pair achieved the same result in Long Beach, before Villeneuve spun in Spain and Scheckter finished fourth. In a charging drive from seventh on the grid, Scheckter claimed his first win of the season at Zolder. He then qualified on pole for the Monaco Grand Prix and staved off a challenge from Clay Regazzoni to take victory. Seventh in France preceded a fifth place in Britain and fourth in Germany. Scheckter finished fourth again in Austria, before recovering from a bad start in Zandvoort to charge up to second. With a popular win at Ferrari's home in Monza, Scheckter clinched the world championship two races in advance. He concluded the year with a fourth place in Canada and a retirement caused by tyre failure in the United States.

However, Scheckter struggled badly in his 1980 title defence, even failing to qualify for the Canadian Grand Prix. After managing only two points, he announced his retirement from the team and the sport. He later explained his retirement by stating: "One or two drivers were dying every year, I’d won the championship and the magic was gone."

Scheckter was the last driver to win a Drivers' Championship for Ferrari until Michael Schumacher twenty-one years later in 2000.

== Other ventures ==
=== Broadcasting ===
In 1981, CBS Sports hired Scheckter as a Pit reporter for its F1 coverage. Scheckter was brought in by ABC's Wide World of Sports as a Pit reporter for the 1983 Monaco Grand Prix. Scheckter was a guest commentator for ITV during the 1999 San Marino Grand Prix, replacing Martin Brundle.

Scheckter won the World Superstars competition in 1981, taking place in Key Biscayne, Florida. He defeated athletes such as Russ Francis, Renaldo Nehemiah, Peter Müller, Rick Barry, Gaétan Boucher and Andy Ripley.

=== Business ===
After his retirement, Scheckter founded a weapons simulation business in 1984 called Firearms Training Systems (FATS), whose revenue eclipsed £100 million by the early 1990s. The company built firearms training simulators for military, law enforcement and security organisations.

=== Farming ===
Scheckter spent his time as a biodynamic farmer, having bought the 2,500 acres (1,000 ha) Laverstoke Park Farm, near Overton, Hampshire, 40 miles (64 km) south west of London. As an organic farming expert, Scheckter was featured in 2005 on the Visionhealth DVD and TV documentaries "Asthma: An Integrated Approach", "Arthritis: An Integrated Approach" and "Diabetes: An Integrated Approach". On 20 November 2011, he also appeared on the Countryfile television show to make a case for organic food. Laverstoke Park Farm was also featured on BBC's Escape To the Country where Scheckter showed viewers how Buffalo Mozzarella was made. In December 2009, Scheckter announced his intention to produce a biodynamic sparkling wine by 2012. In 2015, the farm was the setting for ITV's Sugar Free Farm where a group of celebrities had to go sugar free for two weeks whilst working on the farm. In 2024, it was announced the farm would cease dairy production and buffalo farming with operations at the compost plant not affected and that the farm would continue to host carfest,which it did until 2026, when Carfest moved to Silverstone.

In May 2025 Scheckter placed the farm on the market, as of November 2026 the farm remains unsold.

=== Charity ===
In 2004, Scheckter was reunited with his championship-winning Ferrari at the South African two-seater F1x2 Charity Grand Prix at Kyalami in South Africa.

== Personal life ==
Scheckter is married and has had six children: two, Toby and Tomas, from his previous wife Pamela; and four, Hugo, Freddie, Ila and Poppy, from his current marriage to Clare.

Scheckter's daughter Ila died on 17 October 2019, at age 21. The sale of his firearms simulation company provided funds to allow Scheckter to help the racing careers of his sons Tomas and Toby. Tomas raced in the Indy Racing League where he won two races. Scheckter's elder brother Ian also raced in Formula One.

== Awards and honours ==
In 1983, he was inducted into the International Jewish Sports Hall of Fame.

In 2024, at the South African Jewish Board of Deputies' 120th anniversary gala dinner, he was honoured among 100 remarkable Jewish South Africans who have contributed to South Africa. The ceremony included speeches from Chief Rabbi Ephraim Mirvis, and Scheckter was honoured among other sports figures such as Ali Bacher and Joel Stransky.

== Racing record ==
=== Career summary ===
Season	Series	Team	Races	Wins	Poles	F/Laps	Podiums	Points	Position
1972	European Formula Two	Bruce McLaren Motor Racing	8	1	0	1	1	15	8th
1972	British Formula Two	Bruce McLaren Motor Racing	5	1	0	0	1	12	4th
1972	Formula One	Yardley Team McLaren	1	0	0	0	0	0	NC
1973	SCCA Continental Championship	Taylor-Entin	9	4	2	2	8	144	**1st**
1973	Formula One	Yardley Team McLaren	5	0	0	0	0	0	NC
1973	European Formula Two	Motul Rondel Racing	2	0	0	0	0	0	NC
1973	European Formula 5000	Sid Taylor Racing	2	0	0	0	0	0	NC
1973	World Sportscar Championship	Herb Wetanson	0	0	0	0	0	0	NC
1974	Formula One	Elf Team Tyrrell	15	2	0	2	6	45	**3rd**
1974	World Sportscar Championship	BMW Motorsport	1	0	0	0	0	0	NC
1975	Formula One	Elf Team Tyrrell	14	1	0	0	3	20	7th
1975	World Sportscar Championship	Willi Kauhsen Racing Team	3	0	1	1	0	6	NC
1975	SCCA Continental Championship	Hogan Racing	1	0	0	0	0	0	NC
1975	SCCA Continental Championship	Shadow Racing Team	1	0	0	0	0	0	NC
1976	Formula One	Elf Team Tyrrell	16	1	1	1	5	49	**3rd**
1976	World Sportscar Championship	Automobiles Alpine	1	0	0	0	0	0	NC
1977	Formula One	Walter Wolf Racing	17	3	1	2	9	55	**2nd**
1978	Formula One	Walter Wolf Racing	16	0	0	0	4	24	7th
1979	Formula One	SEFAC Ferrari	15	3	1	0	6	51	**1st**
1980	Formula One	SEFAC Ferrari	13	0	0	0	0	2	19th

=== Complete Formula One World Championship results ===
(key) (Races in bold indicate pole position; races in italics indicate fastest lap)

Year	Entrant	Chassis	Engine	1	2	3	4	5	6	7	8	9	10	11	12	13	14	15	16	17	WDC	Points
1972	Yardley Team McLaren	McLaren M19A	Cosworth V8	ARG	RSA	ESP	MON	BEL	FRA	GBR	GER	AUT	ITA	CAN	USA; 9						NC	0
1973	Yardley Team McLaren	McLaren M19A	Cosworth V8	ARG	BRA	RSA; 9	ESP	BEL	MON	SWE											NC	0
1973	Yardley Team McLaren	McLaren M23	Cosworth V8								FRA; Ret	GBR; Ret	NED	GER	AUT	ITA	CAN; Ret	USA; Ret			NC	0
1974	Elf Team Tyrrell	Tyrrell 006	Cosworth V8	ARG; Ret	BRA; 13	RSA; 8															**3rd**	**45**
1974	Elf Team Tyrrell	Tyrrell 007	Cosworth V8				ESP; 5	BEL; 3	MON; 2	SWE; 1	NED; 5	FRA; 4	GBR; 1	GER; 2	AUT; Ret	ITA; 3	CAN; Ret	USA; Ret			**3rd**	**45**
1975	Elf Team Tyrrell	Tyrrell 007	Cosworth V8	ARG; 11	BRA; Ret	RSA; 1	ESP; Ret	MON; 7	BEL; 2	SWE; 7	NED; 16	FRA; 9	GBR; 3	GER; Ret	AUT; 8	ITA; 8	USA; 6				7th	20
1976	Elf Team Tyrrell	Tyrrell 007	Cosworth V8	BRA; 5	RSA; 4	USW; Ret	ESP; Ret														**3rd**	**49**
1976	Elf Team Tyrrell	Tyrrell P34	Cosworth V8					BEL; 4	MON; 2	**SWE**; 1	FRA; 6	GBR; 2	GER; 2	AUT; Ret	NED; 5	ITA; 5	CAN; 4	USA; 2	JPN; Ret		**3rd**	**49**
1977	Walter Wolf Racing	Wolf WR1	Cosworth V8	ARG; 1	BRA; Ret	RSA; 2	USW; 3		MON; 1		SWE; Ret		GBR; Ret				ITA; Ret		CAN; 1		**2nd**	**55**
1977	Walter Wolf Racing	Wolf WR2	Cosworth V8					ESP; 3						**GER**; 2		NED; 3		USA; 3			**2nd**	**55**
1977	Walter Wolf Racing	Wolf WR3	Cosworth V8							BEL; Ret		FRA; Ret			AUT; Ret					JPN; 10	**2nd**	**55**
1978	Walter Wolf Racing	Wolf WR4	Cosworth V8	ARG; 10																	7th	24
1978	Walter Wolf Racing	Wolf WR1	Cosworth V8		BRA; Ret	RSA; Ret		MON; 3	BEL; Ret												7th	24
1978	Walter Wolf Racing	Wolf WR3	Cosworth V8				USW; Ret														7th	24
1978	Walter Wolf Racing	Wolf WR5	Cosworth V8							ESP; 4	SWE; Ret	FRA; 6	GBR; Ret	GER; 2	AUT; Ret		ITA; 12				7th	24
1978	Walter Wolf Racing	Wolf WR6	Cosworth V8													NED; 12		USA; 3	CAN; 2		7th	24
1979	SEFAC Ferrari	Ferrari 312T3	Ferrari Flat-12	ARG; Ret	BRA; 6																**1st**	**51 (60)**
1979	SEFAC Ferrari	Ferrari 312T4	Ferrari Flat-12			RSA; 2	USW; 2	ESP; 4	BEL; 1	**MON**; 1	FRA; 7	GBR; 5	GER; 4	AUT; 4	NED; 2	ITA; 1	CAN; 4	USA; Ret			**1st**	**51 (60)**
1980	SEFAC Ferrari	Ferrari 312T5	Ferrari Flat-12	ARG; Ret	BRA; Ret	RSA; Ret	USW; 5	BEL; 8	MON; Ret	FRA; 12	GBR; 10	GER; 13	AUT; 13	NED; 9	ITA; 8	CAN; DNQ	USA; 11				19th	2

=== Formula One non-championship results ===
(key) (Races in bold indicate pole position) (Races in italics indicate fastest lap)

Year	Entrant	Chassis	Engine	1	2	3	4	5	6
1972	Yardley Team McLaren	McLaren M19A	Cosworth V8	ROC	BRA	INT	OUL	REP	VIC; NC
1973	Yardley Team McLaren	McLaren M19C	Cosworth V8	ROC; Ret	INT				
1974	Elf Team Tyrrell	Tyrrell 006	Cosworth V8	PRE; 2	ROC	INT			
1975	Elf Team Tyrrell	Tyrrell 007	Cosworth V8	ROC; Ret	INT	SUI			
1976	Elf Team Tyrrell	Tyrrell 007	Cosworth V8	ROC; Ret	INT; 3				
1977	Walter Wolf Racing	Wolf WR1	Ford V8	ROC; 2					
1979	SEFAC Ferrari	Ferrari 312T4	Ferrari Flat-12	ROC	GNM	DIN; 3			
1980	SEFAC Ferrari	Ferrari 312T5	Ferrari Flat-12	ESP; WD					

== See also ==
- Formula One drivers from South Africa
- List of select Jewish racing drivers

== Notes ==
Sporting positions
Preceded by Graham McRae	US Formula A/F5000; Champion; 1973	Succeeded by Brian Redman
Preceded by Mario Andretti	Formula One World Champion; 1979	Succeeded by Alan Jones
