= Wolf WR5 =

1978 Formula One racing car

Wolf WR5/6
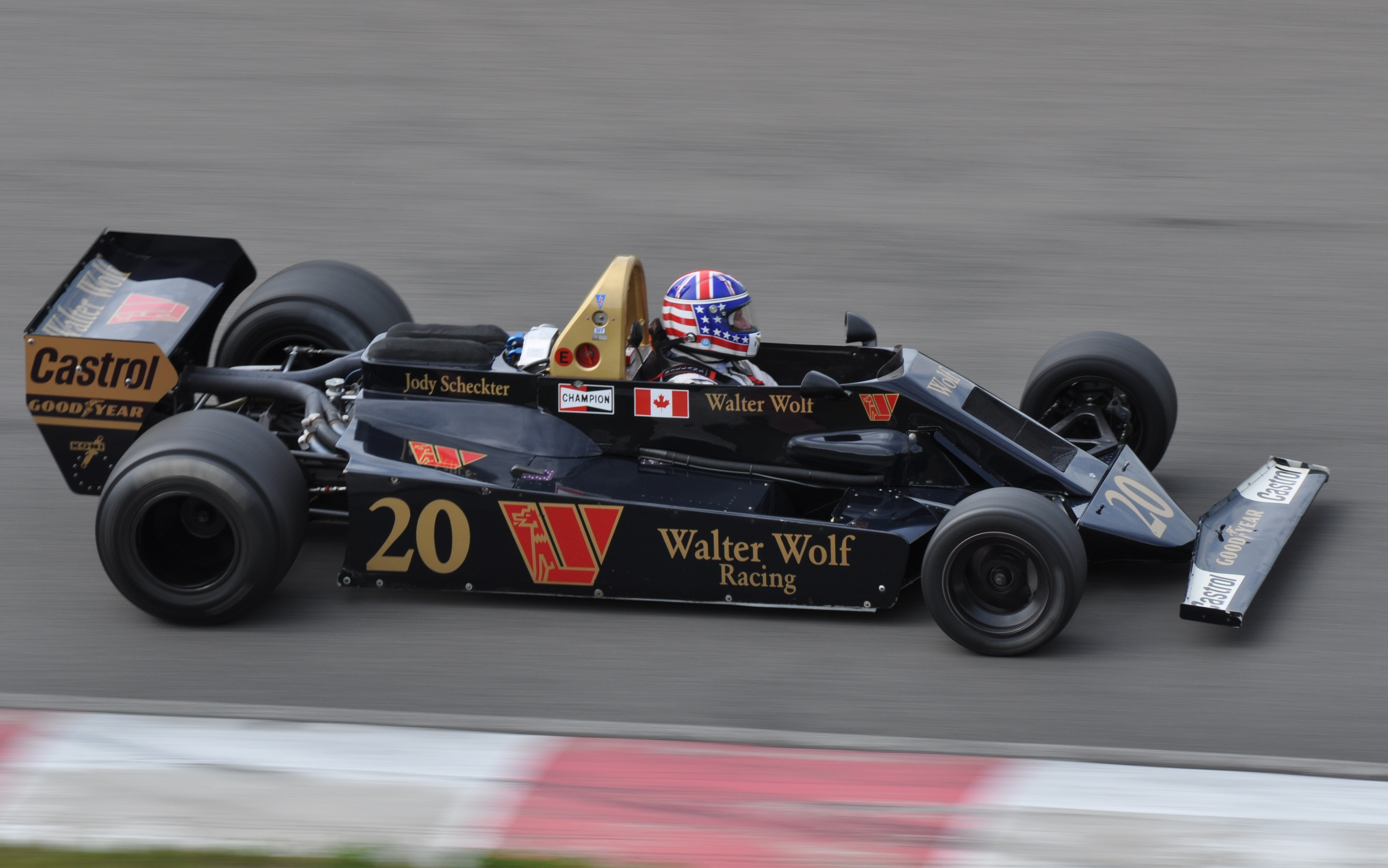
- The WR6 demonstrated in 2010
- Category: Formula One
- Constructor: Walter Wolf Racing
- Designer: Harvey Postlethwaite
- Predecessor: Wolf WR1-4
- Successor: Wolf WR7

Technical specifications
- Chassis: Aluminium monocoque, with engine as a fully stressed member.
- Axle track: Front: 1,626 mm (64.0 in); Rear: 1,626 mm (64.0 in)
- Wheelbase: 2,616 mm (103.0 in)
- Engine: Ford Cosworth DFV 2,993 cc (182.6 cu in) 90° V8, naturally aspirated, mid-mounted.
- Transmission: Hewland FGA 400 6-speed manual gearbox
- Weight: 596 kilograms (1,314 lb)
- Fuel: FINA
- Lubricants: Castrol
- Tyres: Goodyear

Competition history
- Notable entrants: Walter Wolf Racing
- Notable drivers: (South Africa) Jody Scheckter
- Debut: 1977 Argentine Grand Prix
Races	Wins	Podiums	Poles	F/Laps
12	0	3	0	0
- Unless otherwise stated, all data refer to Formula One World Championship Grands Prix only.

The Wolf WR5 was a Formula One racing car built for the 1978 Formula One season by the Walter Wolf Racing team. A further example of the model was built, and was given the chassis number WR6. They replaced the successful Wolf WR1 halfway through the 1978 season, trying to challenge the new ground effect Lotus 78. However, Wolf was unable to repeat their competitive performance of 1977, taking just three podium finishes with the WR5/6.

== Complete Formula One World Championship results ==
(key) (results in bold indicate pole position; results in italics indicate fastest lap)

Year	Entrant	Chassis	Drivers	1	2	3	4	5	6	7	8	9	10	11	12	13	14	15	16	Points	WCC
1978	Walter Wolf Racing	WR5; WR6		ARG	BRA	RSA	USW	MON	BEL	ESP	SWE	FRA	GBR	GER	AUT	NED	ITA	USA	CAN	24^{1}	5th
1978	Walter Wolf Racing	WR5; WR6	Jody Scheckter					PO	Ret	4	Ret	6	Ret	2	Ret	12	12	3	2	24^{1}	5th
1978	Walter Wolf Racing	WR5; WR6	Bobby Rahal															12	DNS	24^{1}	5th

^{1}20 points were scored using the WR5/6, the remaining points were scored using the Wolf WR1.
