= List of Formula One Grand Prix winners (constructors) =

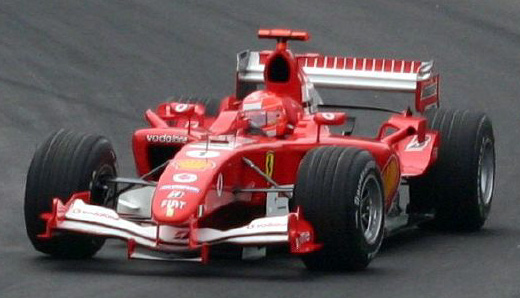
Scuderia Ferrari have won the most Formula One Grands Prix.

Formula One (F1) is the highest class of open-wheeled auto racing defined by the Fédération Internationale de l'Automobile (FIA), motorsport's world governing body. The "formula" in the name refers to a set of rules to which all participants and cars must conform. The F1 World Championship season consists of a series of races, known as Grands Prix, held usually on purpose-built circuits, and in a few cases on closed city streets. The results of each race are combined to determine two annual World Championships, one for drivers and one for constructors.

Ferrari hold the record for the most Grand Prix victories, having won 250 times. McLaren are second with 206 wins, and Mercedes are third with 143 wins. Nine countries have produced winning constructors; apart from the six countries which are regarded as the major competitors (France, Germany, Italy, Japan, the United Kingdom and the United States), Canada (Wolf), Ireland (Jordan), and Austria (Red Bull) have constructors that have won races despite not having a large automotive industry, with all three teams being based in the UK.

British constructors have won the most Grands Prix, with 16 constructors having won 540 races between them. Italian constructors are second with 272 wins between six constructors. German constructors are third, having won 145 Grands Prix between three constructors. During the first four championship seasons (1950–1953), only Italian constructors won championship races, with the exception of the Indianapolis 500. Five seasons (1973, 1986, 1991, 1992, and 1993) witnessed wins by only British constructors. Since the first win for a British constructor in 1957, British constructors won races in every season until 2013, except 2006. Only one constructor (Benetton) has achieved victories under two different nationalities. Though competing under various nationalities, since 1984 all championship races with the exception of two races (the 1996 Monaco Grand Prix won by the French-built Ligier car and the 2008 Canadian Grand Prix won by the Swiss-built BMW Sauber car) have been won only by cars built either in Great Britain or in Italy. (Note: For comparison, in the shorter period of 1950-1983 there were 44 races (excluding the Indianapolis 500) won by the non-British as well as non-Italian built cars. The winning cars were built in France (32), Germany (10), Japan (1) and the United States (1).)

== By constructor ==
All figures correct as of the 2026 Las Vegas Grand Prix

Note: All wins were achieved by works teams except for 20 races won by three privateer teams between the 1958 and 1970 seasons.

Key
| * | Constructor has competed in the 2026 season |
| ‡ | Formula One World Constructors' Champion |
| † | Has competed in the 2026 season and is a Formula One World Constructors' Champion |

Formula One Grand Prix wins by constructor
| Rank | Constructor | Licensed in | Wins | Years active | First win | Last win |
|---|---|---|---|---|---|---|
| 1 | Ferrari^{†} | Italy | 250 | 1950– | 1951 British Grand Prix | 2026 British Grand Prix |
| 2 | McLaren^{†} | United Kingdom | 206 | 1966– | 1968 Belgian Grand Prix | 2026 São Paulo Grand Prix |
| 3 | Mercedes^{†} | Germany | 143 | 1954–1955, 2010– | 1954 French Grand Prix | 2026 United States Grand Prix |
| 4 | Red Bull Racing^{†} (Note: Alfa Romeo, BMW Sauber, Red Bull, Renault and Shadow were at some point licensed in another country during their participation in Formula One, but did not record wins under these alternative nationalities.) | Austria | 134 | 2005– | 2009 Chinese Grand Prix | 2026 Las Vegas Grand Prix |
| 5 | Williams^{†} | United Kingdom | 114 | 1978– | 1979 British Grand Prix | 2012 Spanish Grand Prix |
| 6 | Team Lotus^{‡} | United Kingdom | 79 | 1958–1994 | 1960 Monaco Grand Prix | 1987 Detroit Grand Prix |
| 7 | Brabham^{‡} | United Kingdom | 35 | 1962–1987, 1989–1992 | 1964 French Grand Prix | 1985 French Grand Prix |
| 7 | Renault^{‡} | France | 35 | 1977–1985, 2002–2011, 2016–2020 | 1979 French Grand Prix | 2008 Japanese Grand Prix |
| 9 | Benetton^{‡} | United Kingdom; Italy (Note: Benetton held a British licence from 1986 to 1995 and an Italian licence from 1996 to 2001. They achieved 26 of their wins as a British team, and 1 as an Italian team.) | 27 | 1986–2001 | 1986 Mexican Grand Prix | 1997 German Grand Prix |
| 10 | Tyrrell^{‡} | United Kingdom | 23 | 1970–1998 | 1971 Spanish Grand Prix | 1983 Detroit Grand Prix |
| 11 | BRM^{‡} | United Kingdom | 17 | 1951, 1956–1977 | 1959 Dutch Grand Prix | 1972 Monaco Grand Prix |
| 12 | Cooper^{‡} | United Kingdom | 16 | 1950, 1952–1969 | 1958 Argentine Grand Prix | 1967 South African Grand Prix |
| 13 | Alfa Romeo | Italy | 10 | 1950–1951, 1979–1985, 2019–2023 | 1950 British Grand Prix | 1951 Spanish Grand Prix |
| 14 | Maserati | Italy | 9 | 1950–1960 | 1953 Italian Grand Prix | 1957 German Grand Prix |
| 14 | Vanwall^{‡} | United Kingdom | 9 | 1954–1960 | 1957 British Grand Prix | 1958 Moroccan Grand Prix |
| 14 | Matra^{‡} | France | 9 | 1967–1972 | 1968 Dutch Grand Prix | 1969 Italian Grand Prix |
| 14 | Ligier/Talbot Ligier (Note: Between 1981–1982 they competed as Talbot Ligier.) | France | 9 | 1976–1996 | 1977 Swedish Grand Prix | 1996 Monaco Grand Prix |
| 18 | Brawn^{‡} | United Kingdom | 8 | 2009 | 2009 Australian Grand Prix | 2009 Italian Grand Prix |
| 19 | Kurtis Kraft | United States | 5 | 1950–1960 | 1950 Indianapolis 500 | 1955 Indianapolis 500 |
| 20 | Jordan | Ireland | 4 | 1991–2005 | 1998 Belgian Grand Prix | 2003 Brazilian Grand Prix |
| 21 | Watson | United States | 3 | 1950–1953, 1956–1960 | 1956 Indianapolis 500 | 1960 Indianapolis 500 |
| 21 | March | United Kingdom | 3 | 1970–1977, 1981–1982, 1987–1989, 1992 | 1970 Spanish Grand Prix | 1976 Italian Grand Prix |
| 21 | Wolf | Canada | 3 | 1977–1979 | 1977 Argentine Grand Prix | 1977 Canadian Grand Prix |
| 21 | Honda | Japan | 3 | 1964–1968, 2006–2008 | 1965 Mexican Grand Prix | 2006 Hungarian Grand Prix |
| 25 | Salih | United States | 2 | 1957–1960 | 1957 Indianapolis 500 | 1958 Indianapolis 500 |
| 25 | Lotus F1 | United Kingdom | 2 | 2012–2015 | 2012 Abu Dhabi Grand Prix | 2013 Australian Grand Prix |
| 27 | Kuzma | United States | 1 | 1951–1960 | 1952 Indianapolis 500 | |
| 27 | Porsche | Germany | 1 | 1957–1964 | 1962 French Grand Prix | |
| 27 | Eagle | United States | 1 | 1966–1969 | 1967 Belgian Grand Prix | |
| 27 | Hesketh | United Kingdom | 1 | 1974–1978 | 1975 Dutch Grand Prix | |
| 27 | Penske | United States | 1 | 1974–1977 | 1976 Austrian Grand Prix | |
| 27 | Shadow | United Kingdom | 1 | 1973–1980 | 1977 Austrian Grand Prix | |
| 27 | Stewart | United Kingdom | 1 | 1997–1999 | 1999 European Grand Prix | |
| 27 | BMW Sauber (Note: From 1993–2005 and 2011–2018 they competed as Sauber; and from 2024–2025 as Kick Sauber.) | Germany | 1 | 1993–2018, 2024-2025 | 2008 Canadian Grand Prix | |
| 27 | Toro Rosso | Italy | 1 | 2006–2019 | 2008 Italian Grand Prix | |
| 27 | AlphaTauri | Italy | 1 | 2020–2023 | 2020 Italian Grand Prix | |
| 27 | Racing Point | United Kingdom | 1 | 2019–2020 | 2020 Sakhir Grand Prix | |
| 27 | Alpine* | France | 1 | 2021– | 2021 Hungarian Grand Prix | |

== By nationality ==
All figures correct as of the 2026 Las Vegas Grand Prix

Formula One constructor wins by nationality
| Rank | Country | Wins | Constructor(s) | First win | Last win |
|---|---|---|---|---|---|
| 1 | United Kingdom | 542 | 16 | 1957 British Grand Prix (Vanwall) | 2026 São Paulo Grand Prix (McLaren) |
| 2 | Italy (Note: One of Benetton's 27 wins were scored with their Italian licence. All the others count towards the British totals.) | 272 | 6 | 1950 British Grand Prix (Alfa Romeo) | 2026 British Grand Prix (Ferrari) |
| 3 | Germany | 145 | 3 | 1954 French Grand Prix (Mercedes) | 2026 United States Grand Prix (Mercedes) |
| 4 | Austria | 134 | 1 | 2009 Chinese Grand Prix (Red Bull) | 2026 Las Vegas Grand Prix (Red Bull) |
| 5 | France | 54 | 4 | 1968 Dutch Grand Prix (Matra) | 2021 Hungarian Grand Prix (Alpine) |
| 6 | United States | 13 (Note: Of these, 11 wins were at the Indianapolis 500.) | 6 (Note: Of these, 4 constructors only won at the Indianapolis 500.) | 1950 Indianapolis 500 (Kurtis Kraft) (Note: The 1967 Belgian Grand Prix won by Eagle, if the Indianapolis 500 is excluded.) | 1976 Austrian Grand Prix (Penske) (Note: Though American-owned, Shadow achieved a victory at the 1977 Austrian Grand Prix having raced with a British licence. See the "1976 Austrian Grand Prix Entry list". and the "1977 Austrian Grand Prix Entry list".) |
| 7 | Ireland | 4 | 1 | 1998 Belgian Grand Prix (Jordan) | 2003 Brazilian Grand Prix (Jordan) |
| 8 | Japan | 3 | 1 | 1965 Mexican Grand Prix (Honda) | 2006 Hungarian Grand Prix (Honda) |
| 9 | Canada | 3 | 1 | 1977 Argentine Grand Prix (Wolf) | 1977 Canadian Grand Prix (Wolf) |

== Record progression ==
| Constructor | Record number of wins | Record held between |
|---|---|---|
| (Italy) Alfa Romeo | 1–10 | 1950 British Grand Prix – 1952 Italian Grand Prix |
| (Italy) Ferrari | 11–49 | 1953 Argentine Grand Prix – 1973 South African Grand Prix |
| (United Kingdom) Lotus | 50–57 | 1973 Spanish Grand Prix – 1975 Italian Grand Prix |
| (Italy) Ferrari | 58–103 | 1975 United States Grand Prix – 1993 Japanese Grand Prix |
| (United Kingdom) McLaren | 104 | 1993 Australian Grand Prix – 1995 Monaco Grand Prix |
| (Italy) Ferrari | 105–250 | 1995 Canadian Grand Prix – present |

== See also ==
- List of Formula One World Constructors' Champions
- List of Formula One constructors
- List of Formula One Grand Prix winners
- Most World Championship Grand Prix wins by engine manufacturer

== Bibliography ==
- Hayhoe, David; Holland, David (2006). Grand Prix Data Book (4th ed.). Haynes Publishing. ISBN 1-84425-223-X.
- Hughes, Mark; Tremayne, David (2002). The Concise Encyclopedia of Formula 1. Parragon. ISBN 0-75258-766-8.
