= 1980 Evening News Trophy =

Brands Hatch (1976-1987)

The Evening News Trophy, was the second round of the 1980 Aurora AFX F1 Championship, at Brands Hatch, the race held on 7 April 1980 (Easter Monday). The race is notable for the victory of Desiré Wilson, who became the first female driver to win a Formula One race.

== Report ==
=== Entry ===
A meagre total of 10 cars were entered for the event, the second race of the series of the 1980 Easter holidays.

=== Race ===
The race was held over 40 laps of Brands Hatch's Grand Prix circuit, a distance of 104.56 miles. A small piece of history was carved out, when Desiré Wilson became the first woman to win a F1 race, a feat which she achieved in remarkable style. At the wheel of her Theodore Racing with Hi-Line Wolf WR4, she simply trounced the opposition, leading from start to finish and extending her advantage of over 15 seconds at the end of the race.

For the Theodore Racing, Wilson's victory more than compensated for the disappointment for teammate Geoff Lees caused the race to be stopped on the first lap. An over-zealous start for the middle of the poor 10-car grid saw the Wolf barge Norman Dickson’s Lotus 78, then spin wildly in the pack; Lees continued, but suspension failure stranded him in the middle of the track. Dickson was the other star of the race. The gritty Scotsman passed the Williams FW07s of poleman Emilio de Villota and Eliseo Salazar on the early stages, fighting off the latter in his defence of second spot after de Villota and Guy Edwards effectively eliminated each other after a touch at Hawthorns.

Giacomo Agostini’s fourth-placed drive was a lonely one in a rebuilt car after a heavy race morning shunt, while the Chevrons of Tony Dean and Brian Robinson squabbled over the F2 category throughout.

== Classification ==
=== Result ===
Class Winners are in Bold text.

Pos.	Class	Driver	Entrant	Car - Engine	Reason Out
1st	**F1**	**(South Africa) Desiré Wilson**	**Theodore Racing**	**Wolf-Cosworth WR4**	
2nd	F1	(United Kingdom) Norman Dickson	Colin Bennett Racing	Lotus-Cosworth 78	
3rd	F1	(Chile) Eliseo Salazar	RAM Racing	Williams-Cosworth FW07	
4th	F1	(Italy) Giacomo Agostini	Team Agostini	Williams-Cosworth FW06	
5th	**F2**	(United Kingdom) **Tony Dean**	**A G Dean**	**Chevron-Hart B42**	
6th	F2	(United Kingdom) Brian Robinson	Grange Performance Cars	Chevron-Hart B48	
DNF	F1	(Spain) Emilio de Villota	RAM Racing	Williams-Cosworth FW07	Collision with Edwards
DNF	F1	(United Kingdom) Guy Edwards	Charles W Clowes Racing	Arrows-Cosworth A1	Collision with de Villota
DNF	F2	(United Kingdom) Bob Howlings	Bob Howlings Racing	Chevron-Hart B42	
DNF	F1	(United Kingdom) Geoff Lees	Theodore Racing	Wolf-Cosworth WR4	Suspension
