= Wolf WR1 =

Formula One car

Wolf WR1-4
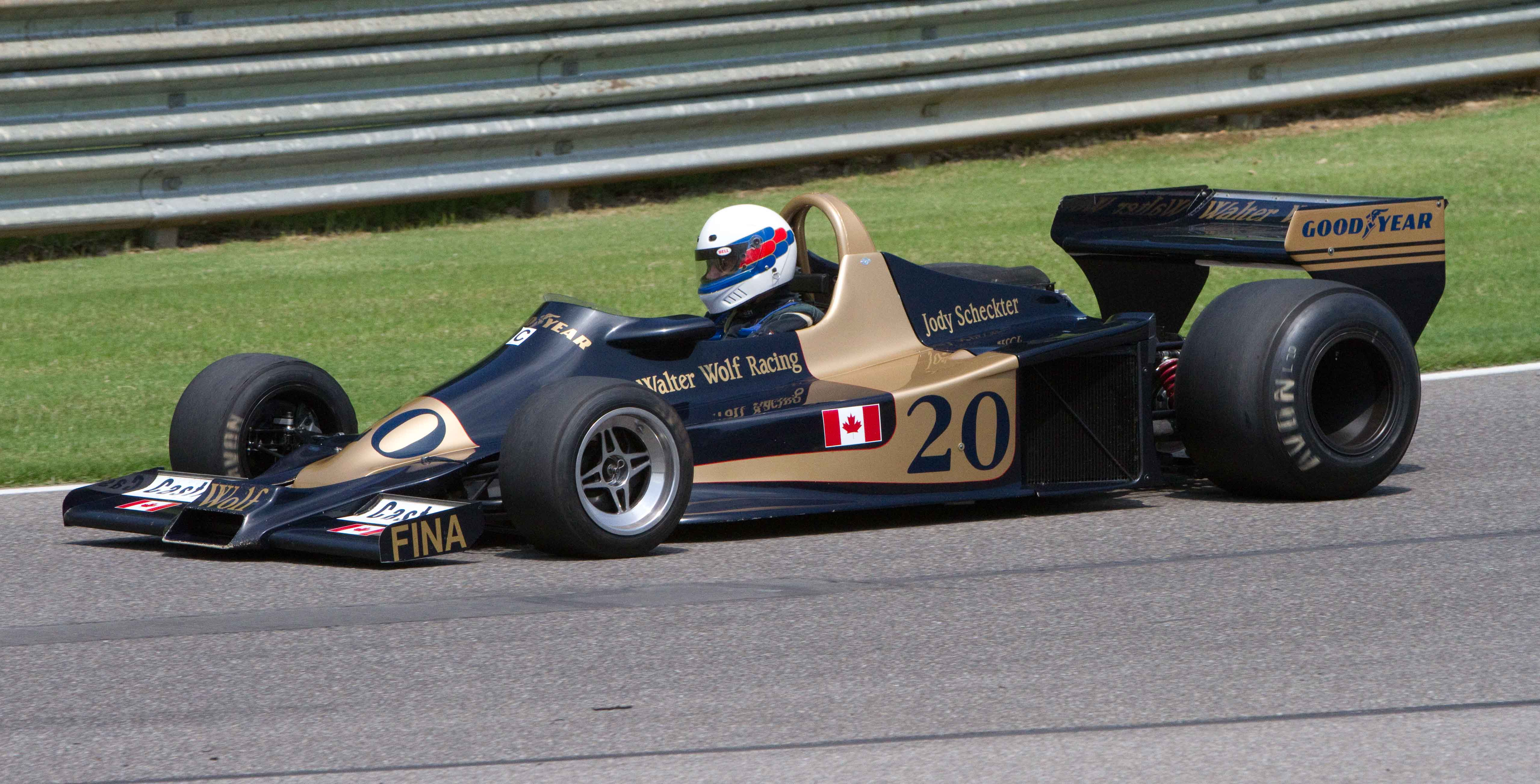
- The WR1 demonstrated at Barber Motorsports Park in 2010
- Category: Formula One
- Constructor: Walter Wolf Racing
- Designer: Harvey Postlethwaite
- Successor: Wolf WR5

Technical specifications
- Chassis: Aluminium monocoque, with engine as a fully stressed member.
- Axle track: Front: 1,410 mm (56 in); Rear: 1,524 mm (60.0 in)
- Wheelbase: 2,616 mm (103.0 in)
- Engine: Ford Cosworth DFV 2,993 cc (182.6 cu in) 90° V8, naturally aspirated, mid-mounted.
- Transmission: Hewland FGA 400 6-speed manual gearbox
- Weight: 585 kilograms (1,290 lb)
- Fuel: FINA
- Lubricants: Castrol
- Tyres: Goodyear

Competition history
- Notable entrants: Walter Wolf Racing
- Notable drivers: (South Africa) Jody Scheckter (Finland) Keke Rosberg
- Debut: 1977 Argentine Grand Prix
Races	Wins	Podiums	Poles	F/Laps
27	3	10	1	2
- Unless otherwise stated, all data refer to Formula One World Championship Grands Prix only.

The Wolf WR1 was a Formula One car built for the 1977 season by the Walter Wolf Racing team. Four examples of the car were produced. The first, completed well before the start of the season, was the WR1. Another two identical cars were built: WR2, finished ahead of the first race; and WR3, ready in March 1977. At the end of the season, a fourth car, WR4, was produced with slight adjustments, and WR1 was remodeled in similar fashion for 1978. The original car was driven exclusively by South African future 1979 World Champion Jody Scheckter in 1977. WR3 and WR4 were also driven by fellow future World Champion Keke Rosberg in the 1978 season.

== Design and competition history ==
For the 1976 Formula One season, Canadian Walter Wolf had bought 60% of the team Frank Williams Racing Cars, agreeing to keep on previous owner Williams as manager. However, Williams left the team before the start of the 1977 season to form his new team Williams Grand Prix Engineering. Having run a renamed Hesketh 308C in 1976, Wolf now needed to build his own car, recruiting a group of talented designers for the job, spearheaded by Harvey Postlethwaite, who had worked at Hesketh Racing. WR1 became the team's first self-constructed car and it made an instant impression when Scheckter won on its début at the 1977 Argentine Grand Prix. The South African would go on to win two additional races, the prestigious Monaco Grand Prix and the team's home race in Canada, all in the WR1 chassis. He eventually finished the Championship in second place. Overall, WR1 was the most successful of the three chassis used in 1977: it raced in ten of the 17 races, scoring all three wins and one fastest lap. Scheckter managed another fastest lap at the Japanese Grand Prix in WR3 and one pole position with WR2 at Hockenheim.

With the arrival of ground effect in 1978, the car became obsolete, even in its remodelled WR4 configuration, and was used only in some of the races. WR3 and later WR4 were given to Theodore Racing for their new recruit Keke Rosberg, who finished just one of his races in the car, at the 1978 German Grand Prix. Scheckter scored one more podium finish in WR1 at the 1978 Monaco Grand Prix. Halfway through the season, the WR1 design was replaced with the new Wolf WR5.

== Complete Formula One World Championship results ==
(key) (results in bold indicate pole position; results in italics indicate fastest lap)

Year	Entrant	Chassis	Drivers	1	2	3	4	5	6	7	8	9	10	11	12	13	14	15	16	17	Points	WCC
1977	Walter Wolf Racing	WR1; WR2; WR3		ARG	BRA	RSA	USW	ESP	MON	BEL	SWE	FRA	GBR	GER	AUT	NED	ITA	USA	CAN	JPN	55	4th
1977	Walter Wolf Racing	WR1; WR2; WR3	Jody Scheckter	1	Ret	2	3	3	1	Ret	Ret	Ret	Ret	**2**	Ret	3	Ret	3	1	10	55	4th
1978	Walter Wolf Racing	WR1; WR4		ARG	BRA	RSA	USW	MON	BEL	ESP	SWE	FRA	GBR	GER	AUT	NED	ITA	USA	CAN		24^{1}	5th
1978	Walter Wolf Racing	WR1; WR4	Jody Scheckter	10	Ret	Ret	Ret	3													24^{1}	5th
1978	Walter Wolf Racing	WR1; WR4	Bobby Rahal																Ret		24^{1}	5th
1978	Theodore Racing	WR3; WR4	Keke Rosberg											10	NC	Ret	DNPQ				24^{1}	5th

^{1}4 points were scored using WR1-4, the remaining points were scored using the WR5-6.
