= Formula One drivers from South Africa =

List of Formula One drivers who competed as South Africans

- Drivers: 24 (Note: Includes Tony Kotze who competed in non-championship Formula One races but never entered a World Championship Grand Prix.)
- Grands Prix: 151
- Entries: 210 (Note: Syd van der Vyver, Alex Blignaut, David Clapham, Brian Raubenheimer, William Ferguson and Desiré Wilson each had one Grand Prix entry but did not start the race.)
- Starts: 189
- Best season finish: 1st (1979)
- Wins: 10
- Podiums: 36
- Pole positions: 3
- Fastest laps: 5
- Points: 282
- First entry: 1961 British Grand Prix
- First win: 1974 Swedish Grand Prix
- Latest win: 1979 Italian Grand Prix
- Latest entry: 1980 United States Grand Prix
- 2026 drivers: None

There have been 24 Formula One drivers from South Africa, with 17 of them having started at least one Grand Prix, and four of them having started more than four races. Jody Scheckter is by far the most prolific and successful South African driver, being the only one to have won a race. During his nine-year career Scheckter won 10 races and the 1979 World Drivers' Championship. There has not been a driver from South Africa in Formula One since 1980.

== Current drivers ==
There are no South African drivers currently competing in Formula One, and none have competed in the sport since 1980. Jody Scheckter was the last South African to enter a race having started the 1980 United States Grand Prix at Watkins Glen.

== Former drivers ==
A total of 17 South African drivers have started in at least one race, but only three of them have ever scored any points. Some other drivers have entered Grand Prix events but did not qualify or otherwise make it through to start the race. That includes Desiré Wilson, one of the few female drivers in Formula One.

=== Notable former drivers ===
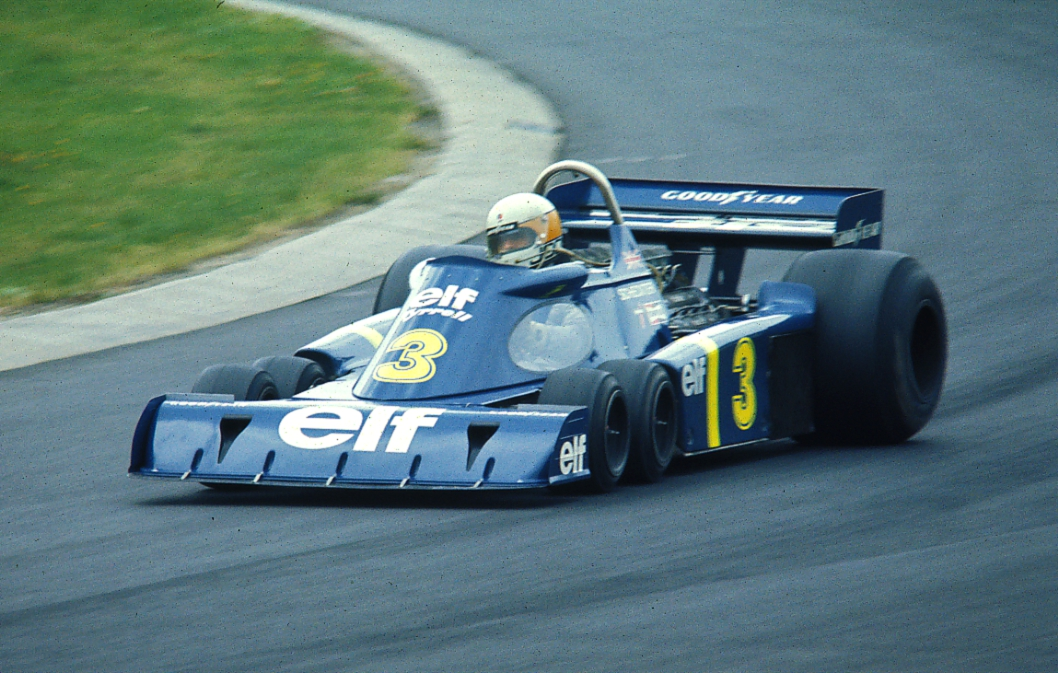
Jody Scheckter in the six-wheeled Tyrrell P34 at the 1976 German Grand Prix

Jody Scheckter's early career gave people cause to label him as a "fast but borderline reckless racing driver" and an "erratic, crash-prone wild man". He debuted with a one-off drive for McLaren in 1972 and was brought for five events the following year. Ken Tyrrell signed Scheckter for the 1974 season, replacing world champion Jackie Stewart. After a slow start he found his form, winning two races and finishing on the podium four other times on his way to third in the championship. He fared less well in 1975 with only one victory, but again came third in the title race of 1976. During that year he drove the unusual Tyrrell P34 and became the only driver to win a Formula One race in a six-wheeled car. His move to new start-up – Wolf – saw him win three races and finish second in the championship but he fared less well in 1978, finishing on the podium just four times. This was enough for him to seek a drive elsewhere and he was signed by Enzo Ferrari for what would prove to be his championship-winning 1979 season. Having achieved this goal he became somewhat uninterested in the sport, driving in the 1980 season to see out his contract before retiring. Across his ten seasons Scheckter drove in 111 races and won ten times.

Ian Scheckter, Jody's elder brother, drove in six races, with different cars, between 1974 and 1976. He landed a full-time drive with March for the 1977 season but only managed to finish in two races, with a best position of tenth place. He left the sport and returned to his home country, finding great success and winning six titles in Formula Atlantic.

Tony Maggs impressed enough on his two drives for Lotus in 1961 to be signed by Cooper for two seasons. He finished second in the French Grand Prix in both 1962 and 1963, but stood on the podium on only one other occasion. He was dropped in favour of Phil Hill and moved to BRM for 1964. After starting just three races with the team, he had a one-off drive for Lotus at the 1965 South African Grand Prix, moving instead to sports cars.

British-born Dave Charlton moved to South Africa when he was young. He started 11 races over eight years starting from 1967, most of which were in South Africa. He was most active in 1972 when he entered four races, but was unable to finish in any of them. Though he never finished higher than 12th place, he is statistically the country's fourth most experienced driver.

=== Driver statistics ===
Following drivers started at least one race:

Drivers	Active Years	Entries	Wins	Podiums	Career Points	Poles	Fastest Laps	Championships
Tony Maggs	1961–1965	27 (25 starts)	0	3	26	0	0	-
Bruce Johnstone	1962	1	0	0	0	0	0	-
Neville Lederle	1962, 1965	2 (1 start)	0	0	1	0	0	-
Ernie Pieterse	1962–1963, 1965	3 (2 starts)	0	0	0	0	0	-
Doug Serrurier	1962–1963, 1965	3 (2 starts)	0	0	0	0	0	-
Trevor Blokdyk	1963, 1965	2 (1 start)	0	0	0	0	0	-
Peter de Klerk	1963, 1965, 1969–1970	4	0	0	0	0	0	-
Paddy Driver	1963, 1974	2 (1 start)	0	0	0	0	0	-
Brausch Niemann	1963, 1965	2 (1 start)	0	0	0	0	0	-
Dave Charlton	1965, 1967–1968, 1970–1975	14 (11 starts)	0	0	0	0	0	-
Jackie Pretorius	1965, 1968, 1971, 1973	4 (3 starts)	0	0	0	0	0	-
Luki Botha	1967	1	0	0	0	0	0	-
Basil van Rooyen	1968–1969	2	0	0	0	0	0	-
Jody Scheckter	1972–1980	113 (112 starts)	10	33	246 (255)	3	5	1 (1979)
Eddie Keizan	1973–1975	3	0	0	0	0	0	-
Ian Scheckter	1974–1977	20 (18 starts)	0	0	0	0	0	-
Guy Tunmer	1975	1	0	0	0	0	0	-

== See also ==
- List of Formula One Grand Prix winners
