= 1979 British Grand Prix =

- Race 9 of 15 in the 1979 Formula One season
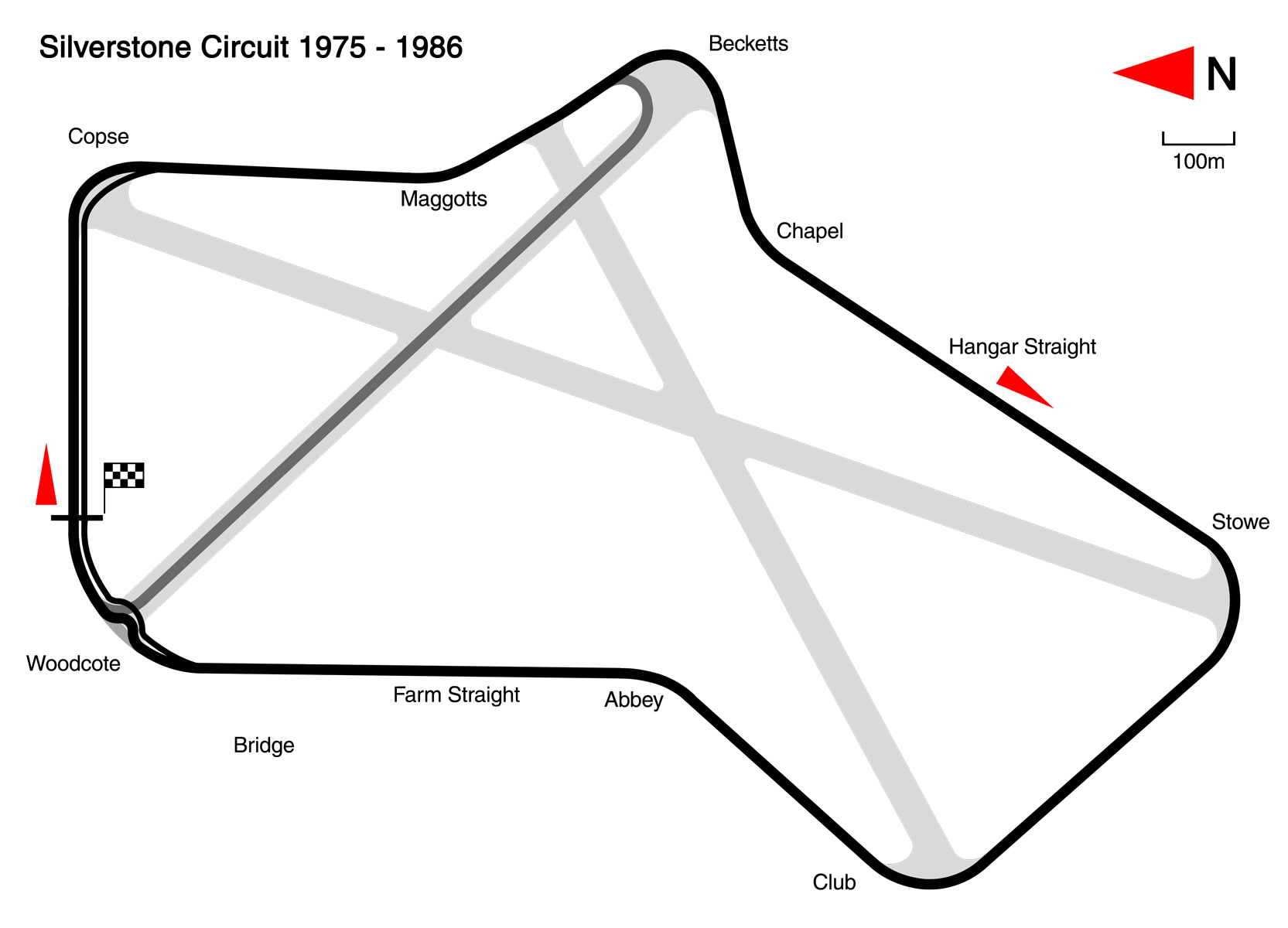

Race details
- Date: 14 July 1979
- Official name: XXXII Marlboro British Grand Prix
- Location: Silverstone Circuit, Northamptonshire, United Kingdom
- Course: Permanent racing facility
- Course length: 4.718 km (2.932 miles)
- Distance: 68 laps, 320.871 km (199.380 miles)
- Weather: Dry

Pole position
Driver	(Australia) Alan Jones	Williams-Ford
- Time: 1:11.88

Fastest lap
Driver	(Switzerland) Clay Regazzoni	Williams-Ford
- Time: 1:14.40 on lap 39

Podium
First	(Switzerland) Clay Regazzoni	Williams-Ford
Second	(France) René Arnoux	Renault
Third	(France) Jean-Pierre Jarier	Tyrrell-Ford

The 1979 British Grand Prix (formally the XXXII Marlboro British Grand Prix) was a Formula One motor race held at Silverstone on 14 July 1979. It was the ninth race of the 1979 World Championship of F1 Drivers and the 1979 International Cup for F1 Constructors.

The 68-lap race was won by Clay Regazzoni, driving a Williams-Ford. It was the first Formula One victory for the Williams team and Regazzoni's final victory in Formula One. René Arnoux finished second in a Renault, with Jean-Pierre Jarier third in a Tyrrell-Ford.

== Qualifying ==
=== Qualifying report ===
Qualifying saw Alan Jones take his and the Williams team's first pole position by 0.6 seconds from Jean-Pierre Jabouille in the Renault; the Williams FW07 had been modified by engineers Patrick Head and Frank Dernie to correct some aerodynamic problems on the car. Nelson Piquet took third in the Brabham with the second Williams of Clay Regazzoni alongside him on the second row, while René Arnoux in the second Renault and Niki Lauda in the second Brabham made up the third row. Completing the top ten were John Watson in the McLaren, the Lotuses of Carlos Reutemann and Mario Andretti, and Jacques Laffite in the Ligier. The Ferraris disappointed, with championship leader Jody Scheckter only managing 11th and Gilles Villeneuve 13th.

=== Qualifying classification ===
Pos.	Driver	Constructor	Time	No
1	Alan Jones	Williams-Ford	1:11.88	1
2	Jean-Pierre Jabouille	Renault	1:12.48	2
3	Nelson Piquet	Brabham-Alfa Romeo	1:12.65	3
4	Clay Regazzoni	Williams-Ford	1:13.11	4
5	René Arnoux	Renault	1:13.29	5
6	Niki Lauda	Brabham-Alfa Romeo	1:13.44	6
7	John Watson	McLaren-Ford	1:13.57	7
8	Carlos Reutemann	Lotus-Ford	1:13.87	8
9	Mario Andretti	Lotus-Ford	1:14.20	9
10	Jacques Laffite	Ligier-Ford	1:14.37	10
11	Jody Scheckter	Ferrari	1:14.60	11
12	Elio de Angelis	Shadow-Ford	1:14.87	12
13	Gilles Villeneuve	Ferrari	1:14.90	13
14	Keke Rosberg	Wolf-Ford	1:14.96	14
15	Didier Pironi	Tyrrell-Ford	1:15.28	15
16	Jean-Pierre Jarier	Tyrrell-Ford	1:15.63	16
17	Jacky Ickx	Ligier-Ford	1:15.63	17
18	Patrick Tambay	McLaren-Ford	1:15.67	18
19	Riccardo Patrese	Arrows-Ford	1:15.77	19
20	Jochen Mass	Arrows-Ford	1:16.19	20
21	Jan Lammers	Shadow-Ford	1:16.66	21
22	Emerson Fittipaldi	Fittipaldi-Ford	1:16.68	22
23	Patrick Gaillard	Ensign-Ford	1:17.07	23
24	Héctor Rebaque	Lotus-Ford	1:17.32	24
DNQ	Hans-Joachim Stuck	ATS-Ford	1:17.44	—
DNQ	Arturo Merzario	Merzario-Ford	1:19.57	—

== Race ==
=== Race report ===
At the start of the race, Regazzoni charged into the lead, but was repassed by team-mate Jones and Jabouille before the end of the first lap. Andretti and the Ferraris also made fast starts, running close to Piquet, Lauda and Arnoux. At the end of lap 2, Piquet made a mistake at Woodcote and spun off, before Andretti dropped out with a broken wheel bearing on lap 4. Then Lauda encountered brake problems which eventually led to his retirement on lap 13, leaving Arnoux fourth with Scheckter fifth and Villeneuve dutifully following the South African.

Up at the front, Jones established a commanding lead over Jabouille, who was struggling on Michelin tyres that were wearing quickly. On lap 17, the Frenchman pitted for new tyres, promoting Regazzoni to second. However, disaster struck for Jabouille when, after a long stop, part of his front wing got caught in an air hose that had not been removed from under the car and was broken off as he accelerated. He was forced to return to the pits for repairs, during which his turbo overheated.

At half-distance, Jones still led comfortably, with Regazzoni still second and well clear of Arnoux, and Laffite moving ahead of the Ferraris into fourth. Then, approaching Woodcote at the end of lap 39, Jones's engine failed, a water pump problem causing it to overheat. Six laps later, Laffite also retired with engine trouble. This left only four drivers on the lead lap - Regazzoni, Arnoux, Scheckter and Villeneuve - with Jean-Pierre Jarier up to fifth in his Tyrrell and Watson sixth.

The Ferraris were also struggling on Michelins, and Villeneuve pitted for new tyres on lap 50, before stopping with fuel vaporization problems five laps from the end. Scheckter, meanwhile, was lapped by Regazzoni on lap 56, before Jarier and Watson passed him in the closing laps.

Regazzoni eventually took the chequered flag 24 seconds ahead of Arnoux, giving Williams their first Formula One victory. It was also Regazzoni's fifth and final win and, as of 2024, the last win in F1 for a Swiss driver. After Jarier, Watson and Scheckter came Jacky Ickx, taking the final point in the second Ligier.

This was the first Grand Prix on which James Hunt, who had retired from racing the previous month, commentated alongside Murray Walker for the BBC's Grand Prix programme.

=== Classification ===
Pos	No	Driver	Constructor	Tyre	Laps	Time/Retired	Grid	Points
1	28	(Switzerland) Clay Regazzoni	Williams-Ford	G	68	1:26:11.17	4	9
2	16	(France) René Arnoux	Renault	MI	68	+24.28	5	6
3	4	(France) Jean-Pierre Jarier	Tyrrell-Ford	G	67	+1 lap	16	4
4	7	(United Kingdom) John Watson	McLaren-Ford	G	67	+1 lap	7	3
5	11	(South Africa) Jody Scheckter	Ferrari	MI	67	+1 lap	11	2
6	25	(Belgium) Jacky Ickx	Ligier-Ford	G	67	+1 lap	17	1
7	8	(France) Patrick Tambay	McLaren-Ford	G	66	Out of fuel	18	
8	2	(Argentina) Carlos Reutemann	Lotus-Ford	G	66	+2 laps	8	
9	31	(Mexico) Héctor Rebaque	Lotus-Ford	G	66	+2 laps	24	
10	3	(France) Didier Pironi	Tyrrell-Ford	G	66	+2 laps	15	
11	17	(Netherlands) Jan Lammers	Shadow-Ford	G	65	+3 laps	21	
12	18	(Italy) Elio de Angelis	Shadow-Ford	G	65	+3 laps^{1}	12	
13	22	(France) Patrick Gaillard	Ensign-Ford	G	65	+3 laps	23	
14	12	(Canada) Gilles Villeneuve	Ferrari	MI	63	Fuel system	13	
Ret	29	(Italy) Riccardo Patrese	Arrows-Ford	G	45	Gearbox	19	
Ret	26	(France) Jacques Laffite	Ligier-Ford	G	44	Engine	10	
Ret	20	(Finland) Keke Rosberg	Wolf-Ford	G	44	Fuel system	14	
Ret	27	(Australia) Alan Jones	Williams-Ford	G	38	Water pump	1	
Ret	30	(West Germany) Jochen Mass	Arrows-Ford	G	37	Gearbox	20	
Ret	14	(Brazil) Emerson Fittipaldi	Fittipaldi-Ford	G	25	Engine	22	
Ret	15	(France) Jean-Pierre Jabouille	Renault	MI	21	Turbo	2	
Ret	5	(Austria) Niki Lauda	Brabham-Alfa Romeo	G	12	Brakes	6	
Ret	1	(United States) Mario Andretti	Lotus-Ford	G	3	Wheel bearing	9	
Ret	6	(Brazil) Nelson Piquet	Brabham-Alfa Romeo	G	1	Spun off	3	
DNQ	9	(West Germany) Hans-Joachim Stuck	ATS-Ford	G				
DNQ	24	(Italy) Arturo Merzario	Merzario-Ford	G				

Notes

- ^1 – Elio de Angelis finished 11th, but received a one-minute time penalty for a jump start.

== Notes ==
- This was the 25th Grand Prix start for Williams, their first pole position and their first Grand Prix win.

== Championship standings after the race ==
Drivers' Championship standings

Pos	Driver	Points
1	(South Africa) Jody Scheckter	32 (36)
2	(Canada) Gilles Villeneuve	26
3	(France) Jacques Laffite	24
4	(France) Patrick Depailler	20 (22)
5	(Argentina) Carlos Reutemann	20 (25)

Constructors' Championship standings

	Pos	Constructor	Points
	1	(Italy) Ferrari	62
	2	(France) Ligier-Ford	47
	3	(United Kingdom) Lotus-Ford	37
1	4	(United Kingdom) Williams-Ford	23
1	5	(United Kingdom) Tyrrell-Ford	21

- Note: Only the top five positions are included for both sets of standings. Only the best 4 results from the first 7 races and the best 4 results from the last 8 races counted towards the Drivers' Championship. Numbers without parentheses are championship points; numbers in parentheses are total points scored.

Previous race: 1979 French Grand Prix	FIA Formula One World Championship; 1979 season	Next race: 1979 German Grand Prix
Previous race: 1978 British Grand Prix	British Grand Prix	Next race: 1980 British Grand Prix
