= 1978 Monaco Grand Prix =

Coordinates: 43°44′4.74″N 7°25′16.8″E

- Race 5 of 16 in the 1978 Formula One season
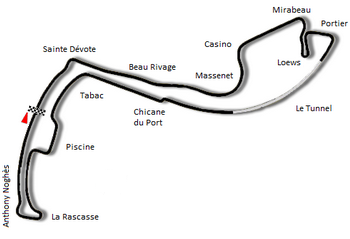

Race details
- Date: 7 May 1978
- Location: Circuit de Monaco
- Course: Street circuit
- Course length: 3.312 km (2.057 miles)
- Distance: 75 laps, 248.4 km (154.348 miles)
- Weather: Dry

Pole position
Driver	(Argentina) Carlos Reutemann	Ferrari
- Time: 1:28.34

Fastest lap
Driver	(Austria) Niki Lauda	Brabham-Alfa Romeo
- Time: 1:28.65 on lap 72

Podium
First	(France) Patrick Depailler	Tyrrell-Ford
Second	(Austria) Niki Lauda	Brabham-Alfa Romeo
Third	(South Africa) Jody Scheckter	Wolf-Ford

The 1978 Monaco Grand Prix was a Formula One motor race held on 7 May 1978 at Monaco. It was the fifth race of the 1978 World Championship of F1 Drivers and the 1978 International Cup for F1 Constructors.

The 75-lap race was won by Frenchman Patrick Depailler, driving a Tyrrell-Ford. It was Depailler's first Formula One victory in his 69th Grand Prix. Niki Lauda finished second in a Brabham-Alfa Romeo, with Jody Scheckter third in a Wolf-Ford.

== Report ==
Carlos Reutemann started on pole with the Brabham duo of John Watson and Niki Lauda second and third. Watson had a good start and led into the first corner, whereas Reutemann collided with James Hunt and had to pit for repairs, which left Patrick Depailler and Lauda second and third. For the first half of the race, the top three remained the same until Watson had an off allowing Depailler and Lauda through, but the latter then suffered a puncture and had to pit for tyres before charging back up and retaking second from Watson towards the end of the race. At the front, Depailler took his first career victory with Lauda second, and Jody Scheckter third after Watson made another mistake in the final laps. Jean-Pierre Jabouille's 10th-place finish was Renault's first race finish.

== Classification ==
=== Pre-qualifying classification ===
Pos.	Driver	Constructor	Time
1	Riccardo Patrese	Arrows-Ford	1:31,31
2	Rolf Stommelen	Arrows-Ford	1:31,88
3	Keke Rosberg	Theodore-Ford	1:33,07
4	Derek Daly	Hesketh-Ford	1:33,55
5	René Arnoux	Martini-Ford	1:33,72
6	Héctor Rebaque	Lotus-Ford	1:34,59
7	Brett Lunger	McLaren-Ford	1:34,86
8	Arturo Merzario	Merzario-Ford	1:49,43

*Positions in red indicate entries that failed to pre-qualify.

=== Qualifying classification ===
Pos.	Driver	Constructor	Time	No
1	Carlos Reutemann	Ferrari	1:28,34	1
2	John Watson	Brabham-Alfa Romeo	1:28,83	2
3	Niki Lauda	Brabham-Alfa Romeo	1:28,84	3
4	Mario Andretti	Lotus-Ford	1:29,10	4
5	Patrick Depailler	Tyrrell-Ford	1:29,14	5
6	James Hunt	McLaren-Ford	1:29,22	6
7	Ronnie Peterson	Lotus-Ford	1:29,23	7
8	Gilles Villeneuve	Ferrari	1:29,40	8
9	Jody Scheckter	Wolf-Ford	1:29,50	9
10	Alan Jones	Williams-Ford	1:29,51	10
11	Patrick Tambay	McLaren-Ford	1:30,08	11
12	Jean-Pierre Jabouille	Renault	1:30,18	12
13	Didier Pironi	Tyrrell-Ford	1:30,55	13
14	Riccardo Patrese	Arrows-Ford	1:30,59	14
15	Jacques Laffite	Ligier-Matra	1:30,60	15
16	Jacky Ickx	Ensign-Ford	1:30,72	16
17	Hans-Joachim Stuck	Shadow-Ford	1:31,30	17
18	Rupert Keegan	Surtees-Ford	1:31,31	18
19	Rolf Stommelen	Arrows-Ford	1:31,31	19
20	Emerson Fittipaldi	Fittipaldi-Ford	1:31,36	20
21	Jochen Mass	ATS-Ford	1:31,40	DNQ
22	Clay Regazzoni	Shadow-Ford	1:31,61	DNQ
23	Jean-Pierre Jarier	ATS-Ford	1:32,11	DNQ
24	Vittorio Brambilla	Surtees-Ford	1:32,46	DNQ

*Positions in red indicate entries that failed to qualify.

=== Race classification ===
Pos	No	Driver	Constructor	Tyre	Laps	Time/Retired	Grid	Points
1	4	(France) Patrick Depailler	Tyrrell-Ford	G	75	1:55:14.66	5	9
2	1	(Austria) Niki Lauda	Brabham-Alfa Romeo	G	75	+ 22.45	3	6
3	20	(South Africa) Jody Scheckter	Wolf-Ford	G	75	+ 32.29	9	4
4	2	(United Kingdom) John Watson	Brabham-Alfa Romeo	G	75	+ 33.53	2	3
5	3	(France) Didier Pironi	Tyrrell-Ford	G	75	+ 1:08.06	13	2
6	35	(Italy) Riccardo Patrese	Arrows-Ford	G	75	+ 1:08.77	14	1
7	8	(France) Patrick Tambay	McLaren-Ford	G	74	+ 1 Lap	11	
8	11	(Argentina) Carlos Reutemann	Ferrari	MI	74	+ 1 Lap	1	
9	14	(Brazil) Emerson Fittipaldi	Fittipaldi-Ford	G	74	+ 1 Lap	20	
10	15	(France) Jean-Pierre Jabouille	Renault	MI	71	+ 4 Laps	12	
11	5	(United States) Mario Andretti	Lotus-Ford	G	69	+ 6 Laps	4	
Ret	12	(Canada) Gilles Villeneuve	Ferrari	MI	62	Accident	8	
Ret	6	(Sweden) Ronnie Peterson	Lotus-Ford	G	56	Gearbox	7	
Ret	7	(United Kingdom) James Hunt	McLaren-Ford	G	43	Handling	6	
Ret	36	(West Germany) Rolf Stommelen	Arrows-Ford	G	38	Driver Unwell	19	
Ret	27	(Australia) Alan Jones	Williams-Ford	G	29	Oil Leak	10	
Ret	22	(Belgium) Jacky Ickx	Ensign-Ford	G	27	Brakes	16	
Ret	16	(West Germany) Hans-Joachim Stuck	Shadow-Ford	G	24	Accident	17	
Ret	26	(France) Jacques Laffite	Ligier-Matra	G	13	Gearbox	15	
Ret	18	(United Kingdom) Rupert Keegan	Surtees-Ford	G	8	Transmission	18	
DNQ	9	(West Germany) Jochen Mass	ATS-Ford	G				
DNQ	17	(Switzerland) Clay Regazzoni	Shadow-Ford	G				
DNQ	10	(France) Jean-Pierre Jarier	ATS-Ford	G				
DNQ	19	(Italy) Vittorio Brambilla	Surtees-Ford	G				
DNPQ	32	(Finland) Keke Rosberg	Theodore-Ford	G				
DNPQ	24	(Republic of Ireland) Derek Daly	Hesketh-Ford	G				
DNPQ	31	(France) René Arnoux	Martini-Ford	G				
DNPQ	25	(Mexico) Héctor Rebaque	Lotus-Ford	G				
DNPQ	30	(United States) Brett Lunger	McLaren-Ford	G				
DNPQ	37	(Italy) Arturo Merzario	Merzario-Ford	G				

== Notes ==
- This was the 10th podium finish for Wolf.

== Championship standings after the race ==
Drivers' Championship standings

	Pos	Driver	Points
3	1	(France) Patrick Depailler	23
1	2	(Argentina) Carlos Reutemann	18
1	3	(United States) Mario Andretti	18
1	4	(Austria) Niki Lauda	16
1	5	(Sweden) Ronnie Peterson	14

Constructors' Championship standings

	Pos	Constructor	Points
	1	(United Kingdom) Lotus-Ford	27
1	2	(United Kingdom) Tyrrell-Ford	24
1	3	(United Kingdom) Brabham-Alfa Romeo	20
2	4	(Italy) Ferrari	18
	5	(Brazil) Fittipaldi-Ford	6

- Note: Only the top five positions are included for both sets of standings.

Previous race: 1978 United States Grand Prix West	FIA Formula One World Championship; 1978 season	Next race: 1978 Belgian Grand Prix
Previous race: 1977 Monaco Grand Prix	Monaco Grand Prix	Next race: 1979 Monaco Grand Prix
