= Walter Wolf Racing =

Former auto racing team

Wolf
- Full name: Walter Wolf Racing
- Base: Reading, United Kingdom
- Founder(s): Walter Wolf
- Noted drivers: (Finland) Keke Rosberg (South Africa) Jody Scheckter (United Kingdom) James Hunt (United States) Bobby Rahal
- Previous name: Wolf–Williams Racing

Formula One World Championship career
- First entry: 1977 Argentine Grand Prix
- Races entered: 48
- Constructors: Wolf-Ford
- Drivers' Championships: 0
- Race victories: 3
- Pole positions: 1
- Fastest laps: 2
- Final entry: 1979 United States Grand Prix

Walter Wolf Racing was a Formula One constructor active from 1977 to 1979, in most races competing with one car only. Being one of the very few teams in Formula One history to win the first race the team entered, it scored three race victories overall and earned Jody Scheckter the runner-up world champion title of the 1977 season. After modest success in 1978, it completely fell back in 1979 and ceased activities after.

The team was owned and run by Slovenian-Canadian Walter Wolf. The team was based in Reading, UK but raced with a Canadian licence.

== History ==
=== 1975–77 ===
In 1975, the Slovenian naturalized Canadian businessman Walter Wolf had started to appear at many of the F1 races during the season. A year later, he bought 60% of Frank Williams Racing Cars while agreeing to keep Frank Williams as manager of the team. Simultaneously, Wolf bought the assets of Hesketh Racing who had withdrawn from F1 due to financial issues and bought some equipment from Embassy Hill, after they had shut down their F1 team following a plane crash that killed six people including team owner Graham Hill and his driver Tony Brise. The team was based in the Williams facility at Reading but used most of the cars and equipment once owned by Hesketh Racing. The Hesketh 308C became known as the Wolf–Williams FW05 and soon afterwards Harvey Postlethwaite arrived as chief engineer. Jacky Ickx and Frenchman Michel Leclère were hired to drive. The team, however, was not very competitive and failed to qualify at a number of races during the year. Leclère left after the French Grand Prix and was replaced by Arturo Merzario while Ickx failed to perform and was dropped after the British Grand Prix, to be followed by a string of pay drivers.

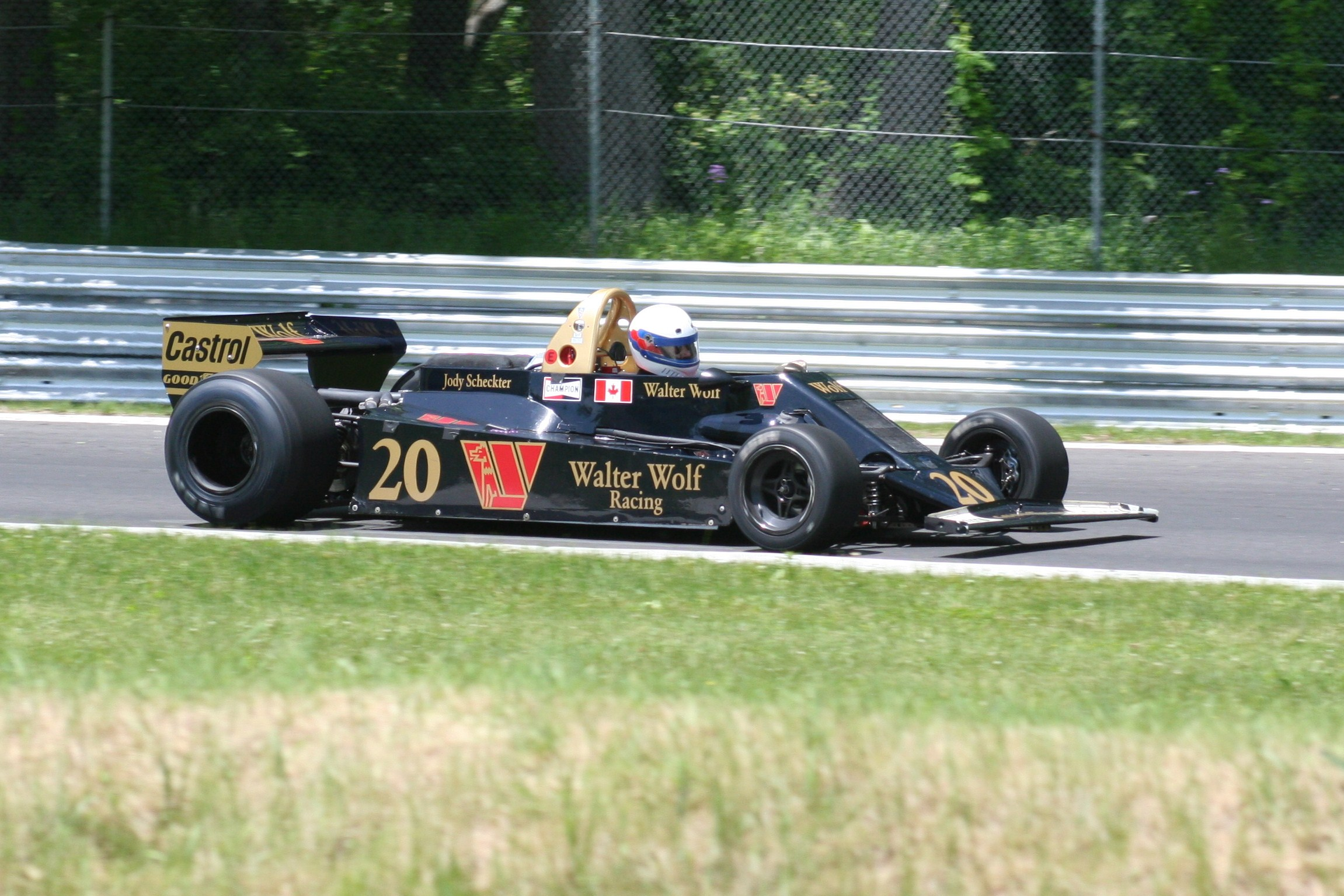
Jody Scheckter's 1978 Wolf WR6 being driven at a Historic Grand Prix at the Lime Rock Park circuit in 2009.

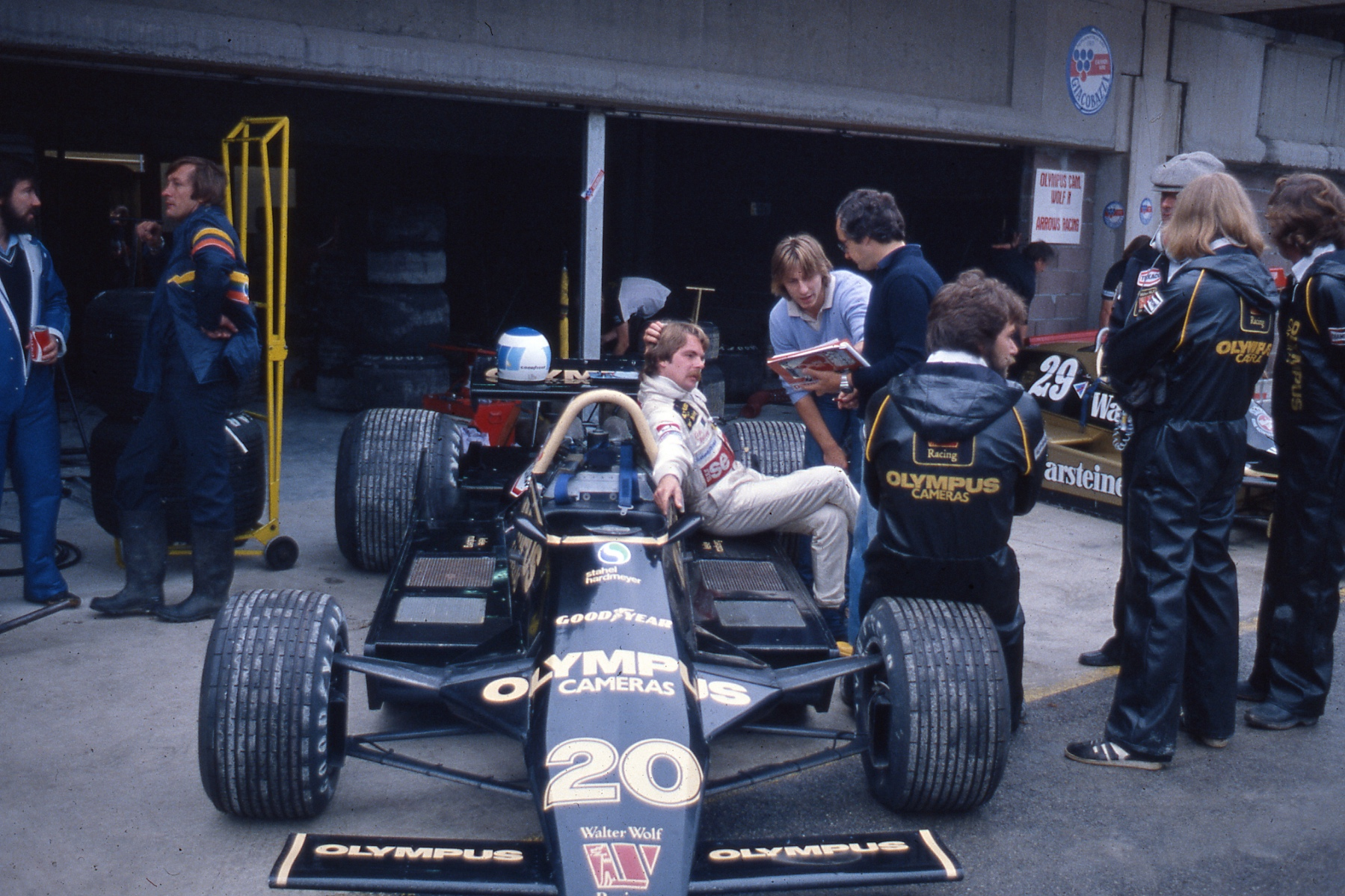
Keke Rosberg with his Wolf WR8 and team members at the non-championship Dino Ferrari Grand Prix in 1979.

At the end of 1976, Wolf decided that the team needed restructuring. He removed Frank Williams from the manager's job and replaced him with Peter Warr from Team Lotus. Disillusioned, Williams soon left the team, taking Patrick Head and several others to set up Williams Grand Prix Engineering. Postlethwaite's WR1 was a conventional Cosworth package but with Jody Scheckter hired from Tyrrell, the team won its first race in Argentina. Scheckter started tenth, and took advantage of six of the cars ahead of him retiring. During the 1977 season, Scheckter went on to win the Monaco Grand Prix and the Canadian Grand Prix and also six other podium finishes, which enabled him to finish second to Niki Lauda in the World Championship and gave Wolf fourth place in the Constructors' Championship.

Around this time, the team developed the WD1 sports car for Can-Am racing. The car was developed with Italian firm Dallara; hence the acronym (Wolf-Dallara).

=== 1978–79 ===
The team remained the same for the 1978 season. Postlethwaite produced the WR5, a new car for the ground-effects era. This did not appear until the Belgian GP. Scheckter finished fourth in Spain and second in Germany but the WR5 soon made way for the WR6 with which he ended the year with a third in the US Grand Prix and second in Canada. He finished seventh in the World Championship.

In 1979, Scheckter was signed up by Ferrari and Wolf signed James Hunt to replace him. Postlethwaite designed the WR7 which ran with Olympus sponsorship. The car was not very successful and retired more than 7 times during the first half of the season. The WR8 soon followed. In mid-season Hunt decided to retire and Wolf quickly hired Keke Rosberg to replace him. The appearance of the WR9 did little to change the team's fortunes. At the end of the year Wolf grew tired of his F1 adventure and sold the team to Wilson and Emerson Fittipaldi, who merged its assets into Fittipaldi Automotive.

A Wolf Racing WR1 is on display at the Canadian Motorsport Hall of Fame.

As of 2015, a Wolf Racing WR4 is being shown and raced at vintage F1 car events in the United States, campaigned by MotoGP world champion Eddie Lawson.

James Hunt's WR7 is on display at Brooklands Museum, Surrey, UK.

== Other motorsport ventures ==
Walter Wolf was also involved in production cars, providing assistance to Lamborghini to develop the Countach in 1978 when the Italian constructor teetered on the brink of bankruptcy.

== Complete Formula One World Championship results ==
(key)

=== Works entries ===
Year	Chassis	Engine(s)	Tyres	Drivers	1	2	3	4	5	6	7	8	9	10	11	12	13	14	15	16	17	Points	WCC
1977	WR1; WR2; WR3	Ford V8	G		ARG	BRA	RSA	USW	ESP	MON	BEL	SWE	FRA	GBR	GER	AUT	NED	ITA	USA	CAN	JPN	55	4th
1977	WR1; WR2; WR3	Ford V8	G	(South Africa) Jody Scheckter	1	Ret	2	3	3	1^{F}	Ret	Ret	Ret	Ret	2^{P}	Ret	3	Ret	3	1	10^{F}	55	4th
1978	WR4; WR5; WR1; WR6	Ford V8	G		ARG	BRA	RSA	USW	MON	BEL	ESP	SWE	FRA	GBR	GER	AUT	NED	ITA	USA	CAN		24	5th
1978	WR4; WR5; WR1; WR6	Ford V8	G	(South Africa) Jody Scheckter	10	Ret	Ret	Ret	3	Ret	4	Ret	6	Ret	2	Ret	12	12	3	2		24	5th
1978	WR4; WR5; WR1; WR6	Ford V8	G	(United States) Bobby Rahal															12	Ret		24	5th
1979	WR7; WR8; WR9	Ford V8	G		ARG	BRA	RSA	USW	ESP	BEL	MON	FRA	GBR	GER	AUT	NED	ITA	CAN	USA			0	14th
1979	WR7; WR8; WR9	Ford V8	G	(United Kingdom) James Hunt	Ret	Ret	8	Ret	Ret	Ret	Ret											0	14th
1979	WR7; WR8; WR9	Ford V8	G	(Finland) Keke Rosberg								9	Ret	Ret	Ret	Ret	Ret	DNQ	Ret			0	14th

=== Private entries ===
Year	Entrant	Chassis	Engine(s)	Tyres	Drivers	1	2	3	4	5	6	7	8	9	10	11	12	13	14	15	16
1978	Theodore Racing Hong Kong	WR3; WR4	Ford V8	**G**		ARG	BRA	RSA	USW	MON	BEL	ESP	SWE	FRA	GBR	GER	AUT	NED	ITA	USA	CAN
1978	Theodore Racing Hong Kong	WR3; WR4	Ford V8	**G**	(Finland) Keke Rosberg											10	NC	Ret	DNPQ		

=== Non-Championship results ===
(key) (results in bold indicate pole position; results in italics indicate fastest lap)

Year	Chassis	Engine	Driver	1	2	3
1977	WR3	Ford Cosworth DFV V8		ROC		
1977	WR3	Ford Cosworth DFV V8	(South Africa) Jody Scheckter	2		
1979	WR8	Ford Cosworth DFV V8		ROC	GNM	DIN
1979	WR8	Ford Cosworth DFV V8	(United Kingdom) James Hunt		2	
1979	WR9	Ford Cosworth DFV V8	(Finland) Keke Rosberg			6

== See also ==
- Wolf Racing Cars
- Wolf-Williams Racing

== Sources ==
- "Wolf WR/1-4 1977–1978". Automobile Historique (in French) (48). May 2005.
- Llorens, Frederick (2008). Wolf Racing, un loup en Formule 1 (in French). TheBookEdition. ISBN 978-2-9519955-3-6.
