= Walter Wolf =

Canadian businessman

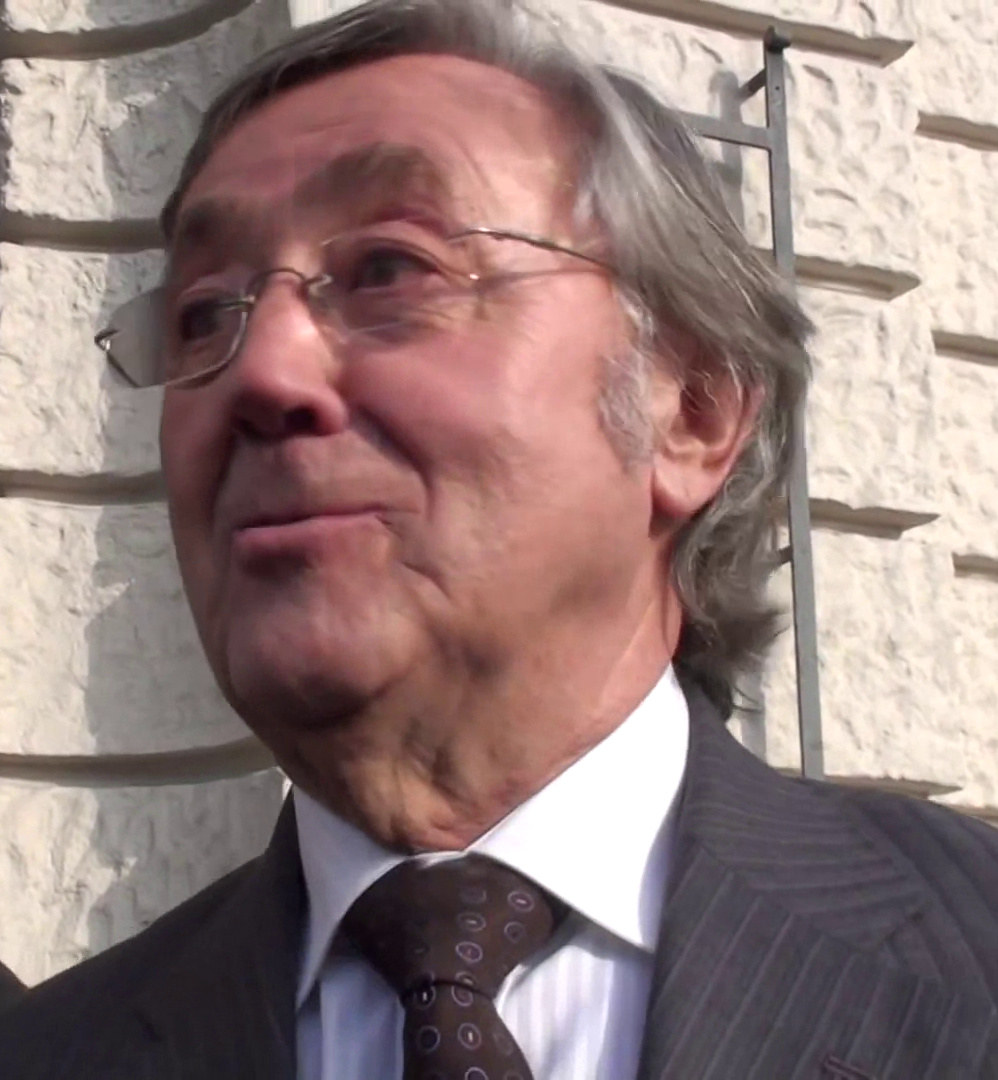
- Wolf in 2012
- Born: 5 October 1939 (age 87); Maribor, Kingdom of Yugoslavia
- Occupation: Businessman
- Known for: Walter Wolf Racing

Walter Wolf (born 5 October 1939) is a Slovenian-Canadian businessman who owned a Formula One team that won three races and is the name-sake of cigarette, perfume, and clothing brands.

== Life and career ==
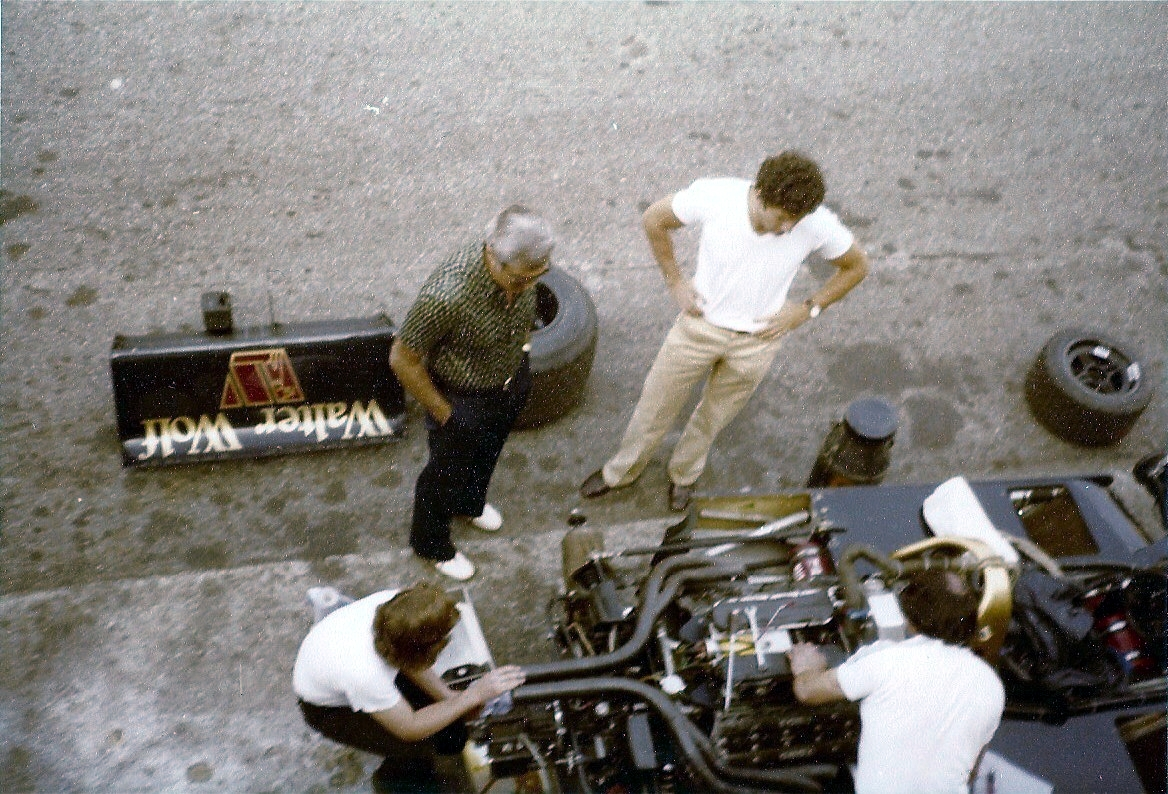
Walter Wolf (standing on the left) in 1978

Wolf was born in Maribor, Slovenia. His mother was Austrian-Slovene from Lower Styria, while his father was a German from Reutlingen. Wolf spent his childhood in his birthtown Maribor, Slovenia, then a republic of Yugoslavia. After his father returned from a Soviet military internment camp in 1954, the family moved to Wuppertal in West Germany. In 1958, they moved to Canada.

In Canada, Wolf became a businessman. At first, his funds helped prop up Frank Williams' fledgling F1 team before Williams left in 1977 to form Williams Grand Prix Engineering. Wolf's team continued as Walter Wolf Racing and before being wound up in 1979 managed to win three F1 Grands Prix.

In 1993, Wolf helped finance the unsuccessful American fire apparatus company Firewolf Industries, housed in a former Piper Aircraft factory building near Lakeland, Florida, US. The actor and vintage car collector L. Christian Mixon worked as a sales manager for this company briefly in 1993.

Wolf was inducted into the Canadian Motorsport Hall of Fame in 1998.

In 2008, Wolf was involved in the so-called Patria affair, a corruption scandal involving the Finnish company Patria. The Finnish broadcasting company YLE's investigative program MOT made claims that he was a mediator in the paying of bribes to Slovenian government officials, including Prime Minister Janez Janša. Both Wolf and Janša rejected all accusations as being untrue. Finnish police issued an arrest warrant against him, but so far he has not been apprehended.

== Branded products ==
The Croatian tobacco company Adris grupa markets one of its cigarette brands as "Walter Wolf". There were also perfumes marketed under the Walter Wolf name.

== See also ==
- Walter Wolf Countach
