= Gunnar Nilsson Memorial Trophy =

1979 British motorsport event

The Gunnar Nilsson Memorial Trophy was a time trial for Formula One cars held at the Donington Park circuit in England on 3 June 1979. It was part of a two-day motor-racing meeting to raise funds for the cancer research project set up by Swedish F1 driver Gunnar Nilsson shortly before his death from cancer in October 1978. The Memorial Trophy was planned as a non-championship F1 race, with a full grid, but the Fédération Internationale de l'Automobile (FIA) – the sport's governing body – refused to recognise the event and most of the teams withdrew. With the entrants reduced to just five cars, each driver was permitted five laps alone on the track to achieve their fastest time. The winning driver was Alan Jones, driving a Williams FW07.

== Programme ==
The organisers at Donington had hoped to host a non-championship F1 race in the manner of the annual Race of Champions meetings. Despite the lack of wheel-to-wheel racing, Motor Sport magazine chose to report it as "Donington's first Grand Prix for over 40 years".

The event was organised to accompany round three of the inaugural BMW M1 Procar Championship, which featured several of the drivers from that year's Formula One World Championship, including Niki Lauda, Mario Andretti, James Hunt, John Watson, Hans-Joachim Stuck, Alan Jones and Nelson Piquet. Also held on 3 June, the BMW M1 Procar race was televised, and the meeting was given further publicity through the efforts of former F1 driver Jackie Stewart and racing enthusiast and ex-Beatle George Harrison. In a TV interview the pair gave at the circuit, Stewart praised Nilsson's character and determination in using his final weeks to work on setting up the fund; he also emphasised that a Swede had done this to benefit a London hospital, rather than one in his homeland. Harrison's song "Faster" was released as a charity single to benefit the Gunnar Nilsson Memorial Fund.

The programme for the meeting included a race for historic F1 cars, which was held on 2 June. The entrants included Juan Manuel Fangio, Stewart (racing one of his championship-winning Tyrrells), Hunt and Harrison, who drove Stirling Moss's 1961 Lotus 18.

For the Memorial Trophy event, the FIA's snub meant that the illegality of the Brabham BT46B "fan car", imposed following the 1978 Swedish Grand Prix, did not apply. Brabham therefore fielded the BT46B driven by Watson in Sweden for Piquet to use in the time trial. The Memorial Trophy was the final competition event for Hunt, who retired from racing immediately afterwards.

The BMW M1 Procar round was won by Piquet. Jones won the time trial, ahead of Hunt's Wolf WR8 and Andretti's Lotus 79. Other events on 3 June included demonstration laps by former F1 drivers such as Stewart, Dan Gurney, Denny Hulme and Fangio. The latter drove a Mercedes-Benz W125. There was also a Formula Three Championship round, won by Michael Roe, and a BMW saloon car race, won by Martin Brundle.

In his round-up of 1979 for Autocourse, journalist Maurice Hamilton described the Donington weekend as an "excellent meeting" and marvelled at Fangio's skills, at age 68. Hamilton also said that the efforts of drivers and others close to Nilsson in raising £800,000 that year for a new cancer treatment unit was a "most rewarding" aspect of 1979 and would outlive the "unfortunate political manoeuvring" that had characterised the season at times.

== Classification ==
| Pos | Driver | Constructor | Time |
|---|---|---|---|
| 1 | (Australia) Alan Jones | Williams-Cosworth FW07 | 1:01.37 |
| 2 | (United Kingdom) James Hunt | Wolf-Cosworth WR8 | 1:02.54 |
| 3 | (United States) Mario Andretti | Lotus-Cosworth 79 | 1:02.67 |
| 4 | (Brazil) Nelson Piquet | Brabham-Alfa Romeo BT46B | 1:03.61 |
| 5 | (United Kingdom) Rupert Keegan | Arrows-Cosworth A1B | 1:05.09 |
