= 1977 Argentine Grand Prix =

- Race 1 of 17 in the 1977 Formula One season

Race details
- Date: 9 January 1977
- Location: Autódromo Oscar Alfredo Gálvez, Buenos Aires, Argentina
- Course: Permanent road course
- Course length: 5.81 km (3.61 miles)
- Distance: 53 laps, 307.93 km (191.33 miles)
- Weather: Dry

Pole position
Driver	(United Kingdom) James Hunt	McLaren-Ford
- Time: 1:48.68

Fastest lap
Driver	(United Kingdom) James Hunt	McLaren-Ford
- Time: 1:51.06 on lap 21

Podium
First	(South Africa) Jody Scheckter	Wolf-Ford
Second	(Brazil) Carlos Pace	Brabham-Alfa Romeo
Third	(Argentina) Carlos Reutemann	Ferrari

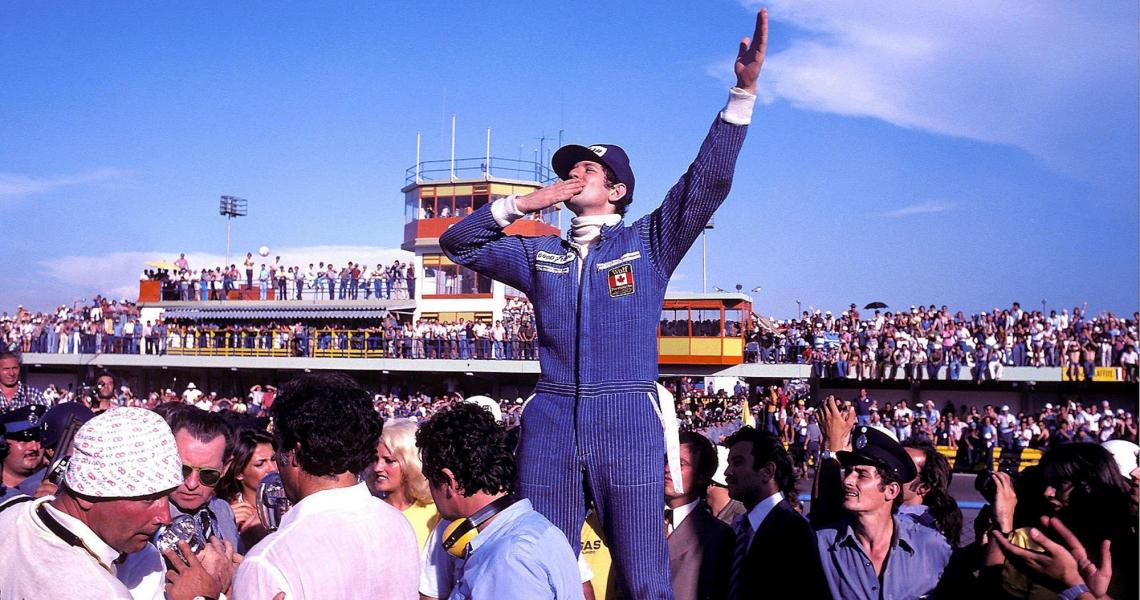
Jody Scheckter celebrating the victory.

The 1977 Argentine Grand Prix was a Formula One motor race held at the Autódromo Oscar Alfredo Gálvez, Buenos Aires, Argentina on 9 January 1977. It was the first round of the 1977 Formula One season.

== Qualifying ==
=== Qualifying classification ===
Pos.	Driver	Constructor	Time	No
1	(United Kingdom) James Hunt	McLaren-Ford	1:48.68	1
2	(United Kingdom) John Watson	Brabham-Alfa Romeo	1:48.96	2
3	(France) Patrick Depailler	Tyrrell-Ford	1:49.13	3
4	(Austria) Niki Lauda	Ferrari	1:49.73	4
5	(Germany) Jochen Mass	McLaren-Ford	1:49.81	5
6	(Brazil) Carlos Pace	Brabham-Alfa Romeo	1:49.97	6
7	(Argentina) Carlos Reutemann	Ferrari	1:50.02	7
8	(United States) Mario Andretti	Lotus-Ford	1:50.13	8
9	(United Kingdom) Tom Pryce	Shadow-Ford	1:50.65	9
10	(Sweden) Gunnar Nilsson	Lotus-Ford	1:50.66	DNS
11	(South Africa) Jody Scheckter	Wolf-Ford	1:50.76	10
12	(Switzerland) Clay Regazzoni	Ensign-Ford	1:50.97	11
13	(Italy) Vittorio Brambilla	Surtees-Ford	1:51.03	12
14	(Sweden) Ronnie Peterson	Tyrrell-Ford	1:51.34	13
15	(France) Jacques Laffite	Ligier-Matra	1:51.52	14
16	(Brazil) Emerson Fittipaldi	Copersucar-Ford	1:51.53	15
17	(South Africa) Ian Scheckter	March-Ford	1:52.40	16
18	(Austria) Hans Binder	Surtees-Ford	1:53.11	17
19	(Brazil) Ingo Hoffmann	Copersucar-Ford	1:53.28	18
20	(Brazil) Alex Ribeiro	March-Ford	1:53.54	19
21	(Italy) Renzo Zorzi	Shadow-Ford	1:54.19	20

== Race ==
=== Report ===
The 1977 season started in Argentina, and it was reigning world champion James Hunt who started off his title defence with pole position in his McLaren. Countryman John Watson shared the front row with him in the Brabham, and Patrick Depailler in the six-wheeled Tyrrell was third on the grid.

Watson took the lead at the start with Hunt second. Watson led for the first 10 laps until Hunt moved ahead and pulled away, with Mario Andretti's Lotus third, but soon the other McLaren of Jochen Mass took the place. Mass had to retire soon after with an engine failure which caused him to spin, and a suspension failure took teammate and race leader Hunt out three laps later. Watson took the lead again, but he also had suspension failures and let teammate Carlos Pace through. Watson eventually retired, and Pace struggled towards the end due to heat in his cockpit and was passed by Jody Scheckter's Wolf and Andretti, but the latter retired then with a wheel bearing failure. Scheckter took the first win of 1977, with Pace second, and home hero Carlos Reutemann completing the podium for Ferrari.

=== Classification ===
Pos	No	Driver	Constructor	Laps	Time/Retired	Grid	Points
1	20	(South Africa) Jody Scheckter	Wolf-Ford	53	1:40:11.19	11	9
2	8	(Brazil) Carlos Pace	Brabham-Alfa Romeo	53	+ 43.24	6	6
3	12	(Argentina) Carlos Reutemann	Ferrari	53	+ 46.02	7	4
4	28	(Brazil) Emerson Fittipaldi	Fittipaldi-Ford	53	+ 55.48	16	3
5	5	(United States) Mario Andretti	Lotus-Ford	51	Wheel bearing	8	2
6	22	(Switzerland) Clay Regazzoni	Ensign-Ford	51	+ 2 laps	12	1
7	19	(Italy) Vittorio Brambilla	Surtees-Ford	48	Out of fuel	13	
Ret	10	(South Africa) Ian Scheckter	March-Ford	45	Electrical	17	
NC	16	(United Kingdom) Tom Pryce	Shadow-Ford	45	+ 8 laps	9	
Ret	7	(United Kingdom) John Watson	Brabham-Alfa Romeo	41	Suspension	2	
Ret	9	(Brazil) Alex Ribeiro	March-Ford	39	Transmission	20	
NC	26	(France) Jacques Laffite	Ligier-Matra	37	+ 16 laps	15	
Ret	4	(France) Patrick Depailler	Tyrrell-Ford	32	Overheating	3	
Ret	1	(United Kingdom) James Hunt	McLaren-Ford	31	Suspension	1	
Ret	2	(Germany) Jochen Mass	McLaren-Ford	28	Spun off	5	
Ret	3	(Sweden) Ronnie Peterson	Tyrrell-Ford	28	Spun off	14	
Ret	29	(Brazil) Ingo Hoffmann	Fittipaldi-Ford	22	Engine	19	
Ret	11	(Austria) Niki Lauda	Ferrari	20	Fuel system	4	
Ret	18	(Austria) Hans Binder	Surtees-Ford	18	Accident	18	
Ret	17	(Italy) Renzo Zorzi	Shadow-Ford	2	Gearbox	21	
DNS	6	(Sweden) Gunnar Nilsson	Lotus-Ford			10	

== Notes ==
- This was the 100th fastest lap set by a British driver.
- This race marked the 5th Grand Prix win for a South African driver.
- This was the Formula One World Championship debut for Canadian constructor Walter Wolf Racing, and also the debut Grand Prix win for Wolf - the first Canadian constructor to do so.

== Championship standings after the race ==
Drivers' Championship standings

Pos	Driver	Points
1	(South Africa) Jody Scheckter	9
2	(Brazil) Carlos Pace	6
3	(Argentina) Carlos Reutemann	4
4	(Brazil) Emerson Fittipaldi	3
5	(United States) Mario Andretti	2

Constructors' Championship standings

Pos	Constructor	Points
1	(Canada) Wolf-Ford	9
2	(United Kingdom) Brabham-Alfa Romeo	6
3	(Italy) Ferrari	4
4	(Brazil) Fittipaldi-Ford	3
5	(United Kingdom) Lotus-Ford	2

- Note: Only the top five positions are included for both sets of standings.

Previous race: 1976 Japanese Grand Prix	FIA Formula One World Championship; 1977 season	Next race: 1977 Brazilian Grand Prix
Previous race: 1975 Argentine Grand Prix	Argentine Grand Prix	Next race: 1978 Argentine Grand Prix
