= Arrows Grand Prix results =

Racing team results

These are the complete Grand Prix racing results for Arrows Grand Prix International, also including Footwork Arrows.

== Complete Formula One World Championship results ==
(key)

Year	Chassis	Engine(s)	Tyres	Drivers	1	2	3	4	5	6	7	8	9	10	11	12	13	14	15	16	17	Points	WCC
Arrows
1978	FA1; A1	Ford Cosworth DFV 3.0 V8	**G**		ARG	BRA	RSA	USW	MON	BEL	ESP	SWE	FRA	GBR	GER	AUT	NED	ITA	USA	CAN		11	9th
1978	FA1; A1	Ford Cosworth DFV 3.0 V8	**G**	(Italy) Riccardo Patrese		10	Ret	6	6	Ret	Ret	2	8	Ret	9	Ret	Ret	Ret		4		11	9th
1978	FA1; A1	Ford Cosworth DFV 3.0 V8	**G**	(Germany) Rolf Stommelen			9	9	Ret	Ret	14	14	15	DNQ	DSQ	DNPQ	DNPQ	DNPQ	16	DNQ		11	9th
1979	A1; A2	Ford Cosworth DFV 3.0 V8	**G**		ARG	BRA	RSA	USW	ESP	BEL	MON	FRA	GBR	GER	AUT	NED	ITA	CAN	USA			5	9th
1979	A1; A2	Ford Cosworth DFV 3.0 V8	**G**	(Italy) Riccardo Patrese	DNS	9	11	Ret	10	5	Ret	14	Ret	Ret	Ret	Ret	13	Ret	Ret			5	9th
1979	A1; A2	Ford Cosworth DFV 3.0 V8	**G**	(Germany) Jochen Mass	8	7	12	9	8	Ret	6	15	Ret	6	Ret	6	Ret	DNQ	DNQ			5	9th
1980	A3	Ford Cosworth DFV 3.0 V8	**G**		ARG	BRA	RSA	USW	BEL	MON	FRA	GBR	GER	AUT	NED	ITA	CAN	USA				11	7th
1980	A3	Ford Cosworth DFV 3.0 V8	**G**	(Italy) Riccardo Patrese	Ret	6	Ret	2	Ret	8	9	9	9	14	Ret	Ret	Ret	Ret				11	7th
1980	A3	Ford Cosworth DFV 3.0 V8	**G**	(Germany) Jochen Mass	Ret	10	6	7	Ret	4	10	13	8	DNQ			11	Ret				11	7th
1980	A3	Ford Cosworth DFV 3.0 V8	**G**	(New Zealand) Mike Thackwell											DNQ							11	7th
1980	A3	Ford Cosworth DFV 3.0 V8	**G**	(Germany) Manfred Winkelhock												DNQ						11	7th
1981	A3	Ford Cosworth DFV 3.0 V8	**MI**; **P**		USW	BRA	ARG	SMR	BEL	MON	ESP	FRA	GBR	GER	AUT	NED	ITA	CAN	CPL			10	8th
1981	A3	Ford Cosworth DFV 3.0 V8	**MI**; **P**	(Italy) Riccardo Patrese	Ret^{P}	3	7	2	Ret	Ret	Ret	14	10	Ret	Ret	Ret	Ret	Ret	11			10	8th
1981	A3	Ford Cosworth DFV 3.0 V8	**MI**; **P**	(Italy) Siegfried Stohr	DNQ	Ret	9	DNQ	Ret	Ret	Ret	DNQ	Ret	12	Ret	7	DNQ					10	8th
1981	A3	Ford Cosworth DFV 3.0 V8	**MI**; **P**	(Canada) Jacques Villeneuve Sr.														DNQ	DNQ			10	8th
1982	A4; A5	Ford Cosworth DFV 3.0 V8	**P**		RSA	BRA	USW	SMR	BEL	MON	DET	CAN	NED	GBR	FRA	GER	AUT	SUI	ITA	CPL		5	10th
1982	A4; A5	Ford Cosworth DFV 3.0 V8	**P**	(United Kingdom) Brian Henton	DNQ	DNQ	Ret															5	10th
1982	A4; A5	Ford Cosworth DFV 3.0 V8	**P**	(Switzerland) Marc Surer				WD	7	9	8	5	10	Ret	13	6	Ret	15	11	7		5	10th
1982	A4; A5	Ford Cosworth DFV 3.0 V8	**P**	(Italy) Mauro Baldi	DNQ	10	DNQ	WD	Ret	DNQ	Ret	8	6	9	Ret	Ret	6	DNQ	12	11		5	10th
1983	A6	Ford Cosworth DFV 3.0 V8	**G**		BRA	USW	FRA	SMR	MON	BEL	DET	CAN	GBR	GER	AUT	NED	ITA	EUR	RSA			4	10th
1983	A6	Ford Cosworth DFV 3.0 V8	**G**	(Switzerland) Marc Surer	6	5	10	6	Ret	11	11	Ret	17	7	Ret	8	10	Ret	8			4	10th
1983	A6	Ford Cosworth DFV 3.0 V8	**G**	(Brazil) Chico Serra	9		Ret	8	7													4	10th
1983	A6	Ford Cosworth DFV 3.0 V8	**G**	(Australia) Alan Jones		Ret																4	10th
1983	A6	Ford Cosworth DFV 3.0 V8	**G**	(Belgium) Thierry Boutsen						Ret	7	7	15	9	13	14	Ret	11	9			4	10th
1984	A6	Ford Cosworth DFV 3.0 V8	**G**		BRA	RSA	BEL	SMR	FRA	MON	CAN	DET	DAL	GBR	GER	AUT	NED	ITA	EUR	POR		3	10th
1984	A6	Ford Cosworth DFV 3.0 V8	**G**	(Belgium) Thierry Boutsen	6	12		5														3	10th
1984	A6	Ford Cosworth DFV 3.0 V8	**G**	(Switzerland) Marc Surer	7	9	8		Ret	DNQ	Ret	Ret										3	10th
1984	A7	BMW M12/13 1.5 L4 t	**G**	(Switzerland) Marc Surer				Ret					Ret	11	Ret	6	Ret	Ret	Ret	Ret		3	11th (Note: For the purposes of the World Constructors' Championship, a constructor is the combination of the person or body which designs the chassis and engine of the entry. Thus, Arrows-Ford and Arrows-BMW are recognised as separate entries in the championship.)
1984	A7	BMW M12/13 1.5 L4 t	**G**	(Belgium) Thierry Boutsen			Ret		11	DNQ	Ret	Ret	Ret	Ret	Ret	5	Ret	10	9	Ret		3	11th
1985	A8	BMW M12/13 1.5 L4 t	**G**		BRA	POR	SMR	MON	CAN	DET	FRA	GBR	GER	AUT	NED	ITA	BEL	EUR	RSA	AUS		14	8th
1985	A8	BMW M12/13 1.5 L4 t	**G**	(Austria) Gerhard Berger	Ret	Ret	Ret	Ret	13	11	Ret	8	7	Ret	9	Ret	7	10	5	6		14	8th
1985	A8	BMW M12/13 1.5 L4 t	**G**	(Belgium) Thierry Boutsen	11	Ret	2	9	9	7	9	Ret	4	8	Ret	9	10	6	6	Ret		14	8th
1986	A8; A9	BMW M12/13 1.5 L4 t	**G**		BRA	ESP	SMR	MON	BEL	CAN	DET	FRA	GBR	GER	HUN	AUT	ITA	POR	MEX	AUS		1	10th
1986	A8; A9	BMW M12/13 1.5 L4 t	**G**	(Switzerland) Marc Surer	Ret	Ret	9	9	9													1	10th
1986	A8; A9	BMW M12/13 1.5 L4 t	**G**	(Germany) Christian Danner							Ret	11	Ret	Ret	Ret	6	8	11	9	Ret		1	10th
1986	A8; A9	BMW M12/13 1.5 L4 t	**G**	(Belgium) Thierry Boutsen	Ret	7	7	8	Ret	Ret	Ret	NC	NC	10	Ret	Ret	7	10	7	Ret		1	10th
1987	A10	Megatron M12/13 1.5 L4 t	**G**		BRA	SMR	BEL	MON	DET	FRA	GBR	GER	HUN	AUT	ITA	POR	ESP	MEX	JPN	AUS		11	7th
1987	A10	Megatron M12/13 1.5 L4 t	**G**	(United Kingdom) Derek Warwick	Ret	11	Ret	Ret	Ret	Ret	5	Ret	6	Ret	Ret	13	10	Ret	10	Ret		11	7th
1987	A10	Megatron M12/13 1.5 L4 t	**G**	(United States) Eddie Cheever	Ret	Ret	4	Ret	6	Ret	Ret	Ret	8	Ret	Ret	6	8	4	9	Ret		11	7th
1988	A10B	Megatron M12/13 1.5 L4 t	**G**		BRA	SMR	MON	MEX	CAN	DET	FRA	GBR	GER	HUN	BEL	ITA	POR	ESP	JPN	AUS		23	5th
1988	A10B	Megatron M12/13 1.5 L4 t	**G**	(United Kingdom) Derek Warwick	4	9	4	5	7	Ret	Ret	6	7	Ret	5	4	4	Ret	Ret	Ret		23	5th
1988	A10B	Megatron M12/13 1.5 L4 t	**G**	(United States) Eddie Cheever	8	7	Ret	6	Ret	Ret	11	7	10	Ret	6	3	Ret	Ret	Ret	Ret		23	5th
1989	A11	Ford Cosworth DFR 3.5 V8	**G**		BRA	SMR	MON	MEX	USA	CAN	FRA	GBR	GER	HUN	BEL	ITA	POR	ESP	JPN	AUS		13	7th
1989	A11	Ford Cosworth DFR 3.5 V8	**G**	(United Kingdom) Derek Warwick	5	5	Ret	Ret	Ret	Ret		9	6	10	6	Ret	Ret	9	6	Ret		13	7th
1989	A11	Ford Cosworth DFR 3.5 V8	**G**	(United Kingdom) Martin Donnelly							12											13	7th
1989	A11	Ford Cosworth DFR 3.5 V8	**G**	(United States) Eddie Cheever	Ret	9	7	7	3	Ret	7	DNQ	12	5	Ret	DNQ	Ret	Ret	8	Ret		13	7th
1990	A11; A11B	Ford Cosworth DFR 3.5 V8	**G**		USA	BRA	SMR	MON	CAN	MEX	FRA	GBR	GER	HUN	BEL	ITA	POR	ESP	JPN	AUS		2	9th
1990	A11; A11B	Ford Cosworth DFR 3.5 V8	**G**	(Italy) Michele Alboreto	10	Ret	DNQ	DNQ	Ret	17	10	Ret	Ret	12	13	12	9	10	Ret	DNQ		2	9th
1990	A11; A11B	Ford Cosworth DFR 3.5 V8	**G**	(Germany) Bernd Schneider	12													DNQ				2	9th
1990	A11; A11B	Ford Cosworth DFR 3.5 V8	**G**	(Italy) Alex Caffi		Ret	DNQ	5	8	DNQ	Ret	7	9	9	10	9	13		9	DNQ		2	9th
Footwork
1991	A11C; FA12	Porsche 3512 3.5 V12	**G**		USA	BRA	SMR	MON	CAN	MEX	FRA	GBR	GER	HUN	BEL	ITA	POR	ESP	JPN	AUS		0	NC
1991	A11C; FA12	Porsche 3512 3.5 V12	**G**	(Italy) Alex Caffi	DNQ	DNQ	DNQ	DNQ														0	NC
1991	A11C; FA12	Porsche 3512 3.5 V12	**G**	(Sweden) Stefan Johansson					Ret	DNQ												0	NC
1991	A11C; FA12	Porsche 3512 3.5 V12	**G**	(Italy) Michele Alboreto	Ret	DNQ	DNQ	Ret	Ret	Ret												0	NC
1991	FA12C	Ford Cosworth DFR 3.5 V8	**G**	(Italy) Michele Alboreto							Ret	Ret	DNQ	DNQ	DNPQ	DNQ	15	Ret	DNQ	13		0	NC
1991	FA12C	Ford Cosworth DFR 3.5 V8	**G**	(Sweden) Stefan Johansson							DNQ	DNQ										0	NC
1991	FA12C	Ford Cosworth DFR 3.5 V8	**G**	(Italy) Alex Caffi									DNPQ	DNPQ	DNQ	DNPQ	DNPQ	DNPQ	10	15		0	NC
1992	FA13	Mugen-Honda MF-351H 3.5 V10	**G**		RSA	MEX	BRA	ESP	SMR	MON	CAN	FRA	GBR	GER	HUN	BEL	ITA	POR	JPN	AUS		6	7th
1992	FA13	Mugen-Honda MF-351H 3.5 V10	**G**	(Italy) Michele Alboreto	10	13	6	5	5	7	7	7	7	9	7	Ret	7	6	15	Ret		6	7th
1992	FA13	Mugen-Honda MF-351H 3.5 V10	**G**	(Japan) Aguri Suzuki	8	DNQ	Ret	7	10	11	DNQ	Ret	12	Ret	Ret	9	Ret	10	8	8		6	7th
1993	FA13B; FA14	Mugen-Honda MF-351 HB 3.5 V10	**G**		RSA	BRA	EUR	SMR	ESP	MON	CAN	FRA	GBR	GER	HUN	BEL	ITA	POR	JPN	AUS		4	9th
1993	FA13B; FA14	Mugen-Honda MF-351 HB 3.5 V10	**G**	(United Kingdom) Derek Warwick	7	9	Ret	Ret	13	Ret	16	13	6	17	4	Ret	Ret	15	14	10		4	9th
1993	FA13B; FA14	Mugen-Honda MF-351 HB 3.5 V10	**G**	(Japan) Aguri Suzuki	Ret	Ret	Ret	9	10	Ret	13	12	Ret	Ret	Ret	Ret	Ret	Ret	Ret	7		4	9th
1994	FA15	Ford HBE7/8 3.5 V8	**G**		BRA	PAC	SMR	MON	ESP	CAN	FRA	GBR	GER	HUN	BEL	ITA	POR	EUR	JPN	AUS		9	9th
1994	FA15	Ford HBE7/8 3.5 V8	**G**	(Brazil) Christian Fittipaldi	Ret	4	13	Ret	Ret	DSQ	8	9	4	14	Ret	Ret	8	17	8	8		9	9th
1994	FA15	Ford HBE7/8 3.5 V8	**G**	(Italy) Gianni Morbidelli	Ret	Ret	Ret	Ret	Ret	Ret	Ret	Ret	5	Ret	6	Ret	9	11	Ret	Ret		9	9th
1995	FA16	Hart 830 3.0 V8	**G**		BRA	ARG	SMR	ESP	MON	CAN	FRA	GBR	GER	HUN	BEL	ITA	POR	EUR	PAC	JPN	AUS	5	8th
1995	FA16	Hart 830 3.0 V8	**G**	(Italy) Gianni Morbidelli	Ret	Ret	13	11	9	6	14								Ret	Ret	3	5	8th
1995	FA16	Hart 830 3.0 V8	**G**	(Italy) Max Papis								Ret	Ret	Ret	Ret	7	Ret	12				5	8th
1995	FA16	Hart 830 3.0 V8	**G**	(Japan) Taki Inoue	Ret	Ret	Ret	Ret	Ret	9	Ret	Ret	Ret	Ret	12	8	15	Ret	Ret	12	Ret	5	8th
1996	FA17	Hart 830 3.0 V8	**G**		AUS	BRA	ARG	EUR	SMR	MON	ESP	CAN	FRA	GBR	GER	HUN	BEL	ITA	POR	JPN		1	9th
1996	FA17	Hart 830 3.0 V8	**G**	(Brazil) Ricardo Rosset	9	Ret	Ret	11	Ret	Ret	Ret	Ret	11	Ret	11	8	9	Ret	14	13		1	9th
1996	FA17	Hart 830 3.0 V8	**G**	(Netherlands) Jos Verstappen	Ret	Ret	6	Ret	Ret	Ret	Ret	Ret	Ret	10	Ret	Ret	Ret	8	Ret	11		1	9th
Arrows
1997	A18	Yamaha OX11A 3.0 V10	**B**		AUS	BRA	ARG	SMR	MON	ESP	CAN	FRA	GBR	GER	HUN	BEL	ITA	AUT	LUX	JPN	EUR	9	8th
1997	A18	Yamaha OX11A 3.0 V10	**B**	(United Kingdom) Damon Hill	DNS	17	Ret	Ret	Ret	Ret	9	12	6	8	2	13	Ret	7	8	12	Ret	9	8th
1997	A18	Yamaha OX11A 3.0 V10	**B**	(Brazil) Pedro Diniz	10	Ret	Ret	Ret	Ret	Ret	8	Ret	Ret	Ret	Ret	7	Ret	13	5	13	Ret	9	8th
1998	A19	Arrows T2-F1 3.0 V10	**B**		AUS	BRA	ARG	SMR	ESP	MON	CAN	FRA	GBR	AUT	GER	HUN	BEL	ITA	LUX	JPN		6	7th
1998	A19	Arrows T2-F1 3.0 V10	**B**	(Brazil) Pedro Diniz	Ret	Ret	Ret	Ret	Ret	6	9	14	Ret	Ret	Ret	11	5	Ret	Ret	Ret		6	7th
1998	A19	Arrows T2-F1 3.0 V10	**B**	(Finland) Mika Salo	Ret	Ret	Ret	9	Ret	4	Ret	13	Ret	Ret	14	Ret	DNS	Ret	14	Ret		6	7th
1999	A20	Arrows 20E 3.0 V10	**B**		AUS	BRA	SMR	MON	ESP	CAN	FRA	GBR	AUT	GER	HUN	BEL	ITA	EUR	MAL	JPN		1	9th
1999	A20	Arrows 20E 3.0 V10	**B**	(Spain) Pedro de la Rosa	6	Ret	Ret	Ret	11	Ret	11	Ret	Ret	Ret	15	Ret	Ret	Ret	Ret	13		1	9th
1999	A20	Arrows 20E 3.0 V10	**B**	(Japan) Toranosuke Takagi	7	8	Ret	Ret	12	Ret	DSQ	16	Ret	Ret	Ret	Ret	Ret	Ret	Ret	Ret		1	9th
2000	A21	Supertec FB02 3.0 V10	**B**		AUS	BRA	SMR	GBR	ESP	EUR	MON	CAN	FRA	AUT	GER	HUN	BEL	ITA	USA	JPN	MAL	7	7th
2000	A21	Supertec FB02 3.0 V10	**B**	(Spain) Pedro de la Rosa	Ret	8	Ret	Ret	Ret	6	DNS	Ret	Ret	Ret	6	16	16	Ret	Ret	12	Ret	7	7th
2000	A21	Supertec FB02 3.0 V10	**B**	(Netherlands) Jos Verstappen	Ret	7	14	Ret	Ret	Ret	Ret	5	Ret	Ret	Ret	13	15	4	Ret	Ret	10	7	7th
2001	A22	Asiatech 001 3.0 V10	**B**		AUS	MAL	BRA	SMR	ESP	AUT	MON	CAN	EUR	FRA	GBR	GER	HUN	BEL	ITA	USA	JPN	1	10th
2001	A22	Asiatech 001 3.0 V10	**B**	(Netherlands) Jos Verstappen	10	7	Ret	Ret	12	6	8	10	Ret	13	10	9	12	10	Ret	Ret	15	1	10th
2001	A22	Asiatech 001 3.0 V10	**B**	(Brazil) Enrique Bernoldi	Ret	Ret	Ret	10	Ret	Ret	9	Ret	Ret	Ret	14	8	Ret	12	Ret	13	14	1	10th
2002	A23	Cosworth CR-3 3.0 V10	**B**		AUS	MAL	BRA	SMR	ESP	AUT	MON	CAN	EUR	GBR	FRA	GER	HUN	BEL	ITA	USA	JPN	2	11th
2002	A23	Cosworth CR-3 3.0 V10	**B**	(Germany) Heinz-Harald Frentzen	DSQ	11	Ret	Ret	6	11	6	13	13	Ret	DNQ	Ret						2	11th
2002	A23	Cosworth CR-3 3.0 V10	**B**	(Brazil) Enrique Bernoldi	DSQ	Ret	Ret	Ret	Ret	Ret	12	Ret	10	Ret	DNQ	Ret						2	11th

=== Non-Championship results ===
(key) (results in bold indicate pole position; results in italics indicate fastest lap)

Year	Entrant	Chassis	Engine	Driver	1	2	3
1979	Warsteiner Arrows Racing Team	A1	Ford Cosworth DFV V8		ROC	GNM	DIN
1979	Warsteiner Arrows Racing Team	A1	Ford Cosworth DFV V8	(Germany) Jochen Mass	4		
1979	Warsteiner Arrows Racing Team	A1	Ford Cosworth DFV V8	(Italy) Riccardo Patrese			4
1979	Charles Clowes Racing	A1	Ford Cosworth DFV V8	(United Kingdom) Rupert Keegan	Ret	5	
1980	Warsteiner Arrows Racing Team	A3	Ford Cosworth DFV V8		ESP		
1980	Warsteiner Arrows Racing Team	A3	Ford Cosworth DFV V8	(Germany) Jochen Mass	2		
1980	Warsteiner Arrows Racing Team	A3	Ford Cosworth DFV V8	(Italy) Riccardo Patrese	Ret		
1981	Ragno Arrows Beta Racing Team	A3	Ford Cosworth DFV V8		RSA		
1981	Ragno Arrows Beta Racing Team	A3	Ford Cosworth DFV V8	(Italy) Riccardo Patrese	6		
1981	Ragno Arrows Beta Racing Team	A3	Ford Cosworth DFV V8	(Italy) Siegfried Stohr	Ret		
1983	Arrows Racing Team	A6	Ford Cosworth DFV V8		ROC		
1983	Arrows Racing Team	A6	Ford Cosworth DFV V8	(Australia) Alan Jones	3		
1983	Arrows Racing Team	A6	Ford Cosworth DFV V8	(Brazil) Chico Serra	Ret		
