= Arrows A1 =

Arrows A1 Arrows A1B
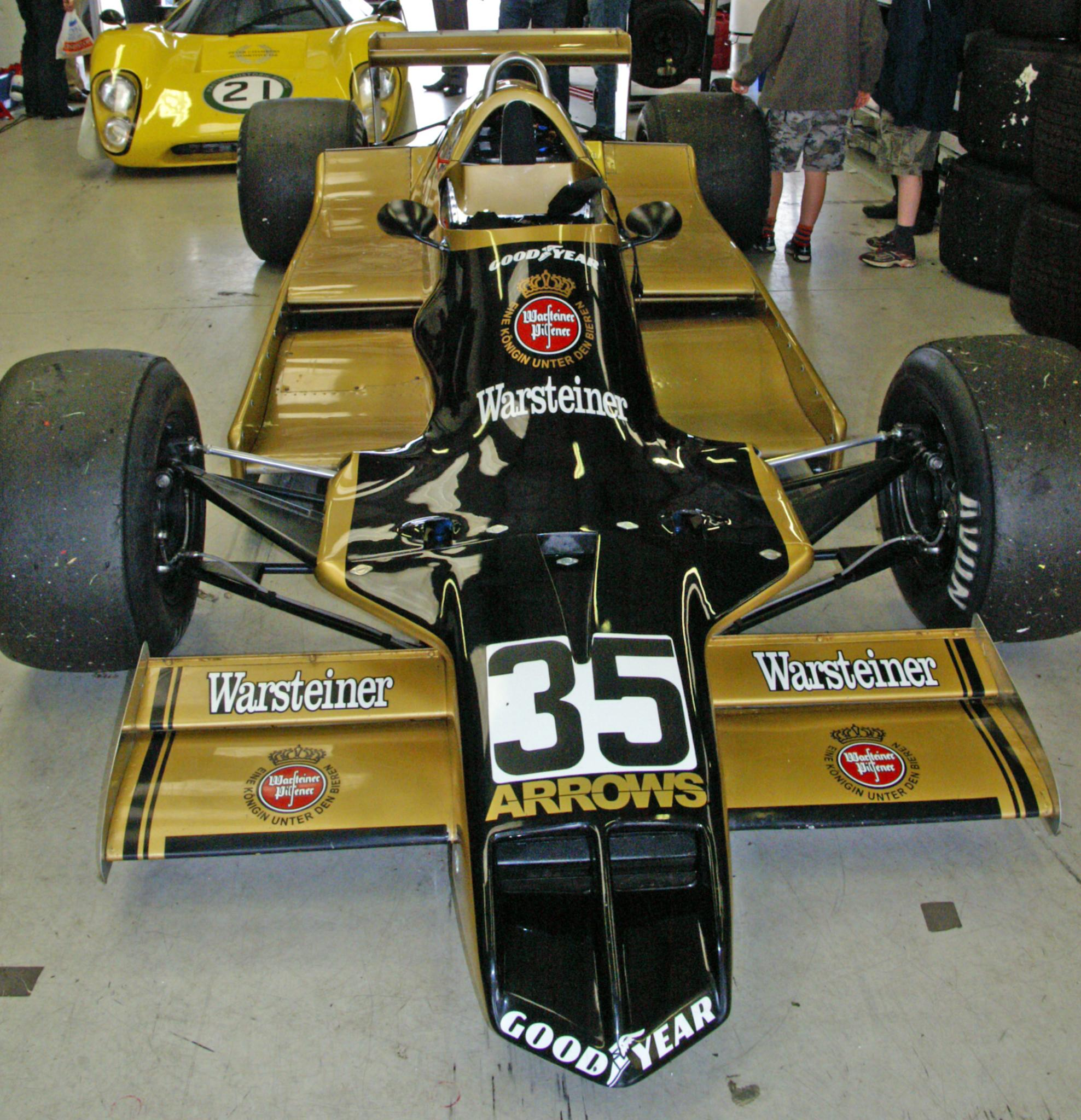
- The A1 of Riccardo Patrese at the 2009 Silverstone Classic
- Category: Formula One
- Constructor: Arrows Grand Prix International
- Designers: Tony Southgate (Technical Director); Dave Wass (Chief Designer)
- Predecessor: FA1
- Successor: A2

Technical specifications
- Chassis: Aluminium monocoque
- Suspension (front): Wishbones with inboard springs / dampers
- Suspension (rear): Wishbones with inboard springs / dampers
- Axle track: Front: 1,676 mm (66.0 in); Rear: 1,549 mm (61.0 in)
- Wheelbase: 2,690 mm (106 in)
- Engine: Cosworth DFV, 2,993 cc (182.6 cu in), 90° V8, NA, mid-engine, longitudinally mounted
- Transmission: Hewland FGA and later FGB/C 5-speed manual
- Weight: 593 kg (1,307 lb)
- Fuel: FINA / Valvoline
- Tyres: Goodyear

Competition history
- Notable entrants: Arrows Racing Team
- Notable drivers: (Italy) Riccardo Patrese (West Germany) Rolf Stommelen (West Germany) Jochen Mass (United Kingdom) Rupert Keegan
- Debut: 1978 Austrian Grand Prix
- Last event: 1979 Canadian Grand Prix
Races	Wins	Poles	F/Laps
25 entries and 19 starts	0	0	0
- Constructors' Championships: 0
- Drivers' Championships: 0

The Arrows A1 was the car with which Arrows Grand Prix International competed in the 1978 and 1979 Formula One seasons. It replaced the Arrows FA1, which was banned by the London High Court on 31 July 1978 after a legal protest from the Shadow team on the grounds that it was a carbon-copy of the Shadow DN9.

Arrows anticipated that they would lose against Shadow and designed and built the A1 in under 60 days whilst the court case was being heard. Hence Arrows were able to present the Arrows A1 to the press just three days after the court case ended and did not miss any races.

Given that the FA1 was a carbon-copy of the Shadow DN9, the A1 isisthe he essentially first true F1 car designed and built by Arrows Grand Prix International.

== Design ==
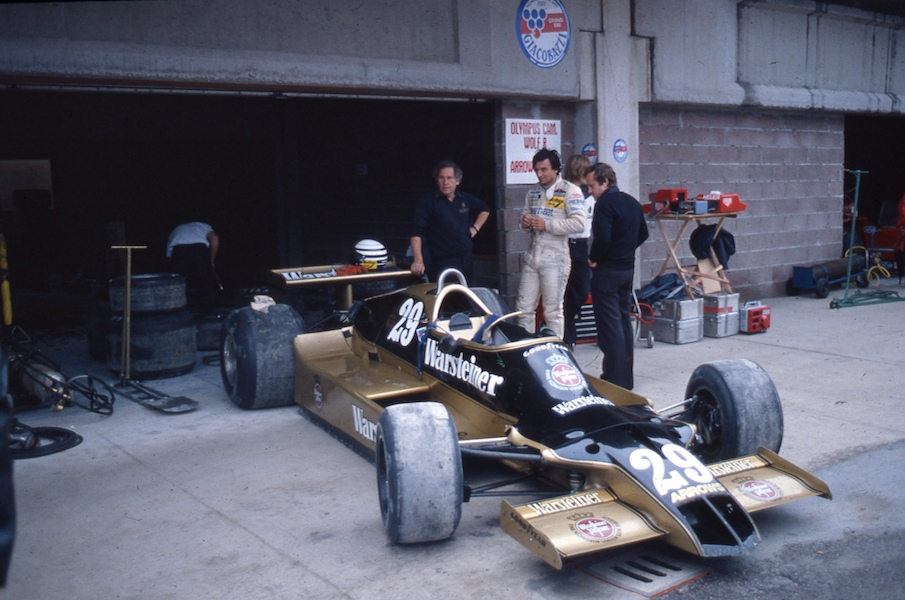
Riccardo Patrese with his A1-C (chassis A1-05) at the 1979 Gran Premio di Dino Ferrari at Imola where he finished 4th

The Arrows A1 was one of the first "ground effects" Formula 1 cars and despite being rushed into service without any testing or development after the FA1 was banned, the Arrows A1 proved competitive. Riccardo Patrese finished 4th in the 1978 Canadian GP. A number of further 4th and 5th places followed in 1979 and that year's Monaco GP could have been the Arrows A1 crowning-glory, with Jochen Mass running as high as third in the race (after qualifying eighth) before brake issues dropped him down to sixth at the chequered flag.

In total six Arrows A1 were built, chassis numbers A1-01 to A1-06. The first three cars (chassis A1-01, A1-02, and A1-03) were used in 1978 and were all built to the same "initial" 1978 specification. For the first race of 1979 (the Argentine GP) three cars (in effect two race-ready cars and a spare monocoque) had been prepared to an updated specification, known as A1-B specification. The two race cars were chassis A1-03 (which had been updated) and the new chassis A1-05, whilst the spare monocoque was new chassis A1-04. During the Argentine GP warm-up, the A1-05 was crashed and this chassis was subsequently rebuilt to a further improved A1-C specification alongside the final Arrows A1 chassis built, A1-06. Both A1-05 and A1-06 debuted at the 1979 South African GP and were used by Riccardo Patrese (A1-06) and Jochen Mass (A1-05) till the radical, but unsuccessful, Arrows A2 was introduced. In fact, even after the Arrows A2 had been introduced, Riccardo Patrese chose at times to practice in and race the older Arrows A1 believing it to be a superior car, with more predictable handling.

The A1-B update included stiffening the monocoque and revising the "ground-effects" side-pods. The A1-C update included a new rear wing with a single central support, improved rear-suspension geometry and totally re-designed "ground-effects" side-pods which were more swept-up towards the rear tyre.

As the updated A1-C specification cars (A1-05 and A1-06) were introduced, three older specification Arrows A1's (A1-02, A1-03 and A1-04) were sold to Charles Clowes Racing and A1-01 was put on display in a museum. Charles Clowes Racing competed in the 1979 and 1980 British Formula One Championship with his three A1's. Rupert Keegan won the championship in 1979 in a Clowes-run Arrows A1 and Guy Edwards finished a very close 3rd in the 1980 season in one of Clowes' Arrows A1 behind two Williams FW07's.

== Formula One entries ==
Year	Team	Engine	Drivers
1978	Arrows Grand Prix International	Cosworth DFV	Riccardo Patrese and Rolf Stommelen
1979	Arrows Grand Prix International	Cosworth DFV	Riccardo Patrese and Jochen Mass
1979	Charles Clowes Racing	Cosworth DFV	Rupert Keegan and Ricardo Zunino
1979	Melchester Racing	Cosworth DFV	Neil Bettridge
1980	Charles Clowes Racing	Cosworth DFV	Guy Edwards, Vivian Candy, Leon Walger and Renzo Zorzi

== Complete Formula One World Championship results ==
(key)

Year	Entrant	Engine	Tyres	Drivers	1	2	3	4	5	6	7	8	9	10	11	12	13	14	15	16	Points	WCC
1978	Arrows Grand Prix International	Ford Cosworth DFV	G		ARG	BRA	RSA	USW	MON	BEL	ESP	SWE	FRA	GBR	GER	AUT	NED	ITA	USA	CAN	11*	10th
1978	Arrows Grand Prix International	Ford Cosworth DFV	G	Riccardo Patrese												Ret	Ret	Ret		4	11*	10th
1978	Arrows Grand Prix International	Ford Cosworth DFV	G	Rolf Stommelen												DNPQ	DNPQ	DNPQ	16	DNQ	11*	10th
1979	Warsteiner Arrows Grand Prix International	Ford Cosworth DFV	G		ARG	BRA	RSA	USW	ESP	BEL	MON	FRA	GBR	GER	AUT	NED	ITA	CAN	USA		5*	9th
1979	Warsteiner Arrows Grand Prix International	Ford Cosworth DFV	G	Riccardo Patrese	DNS	9	11	Ret	10	5	Ret							Ret			5*	9th
1979	Warsteiner Arrows Grand Prix International	Ford Cosworth DFV	G	Jochen Mass	8	7	12	9	8	Ret	6										5*	9th

* 8 points in 1978 scored using the FA1
* 2 points in 1979 scored using the A2
