= Jochen Mass =

German racing driver (1946–2025)

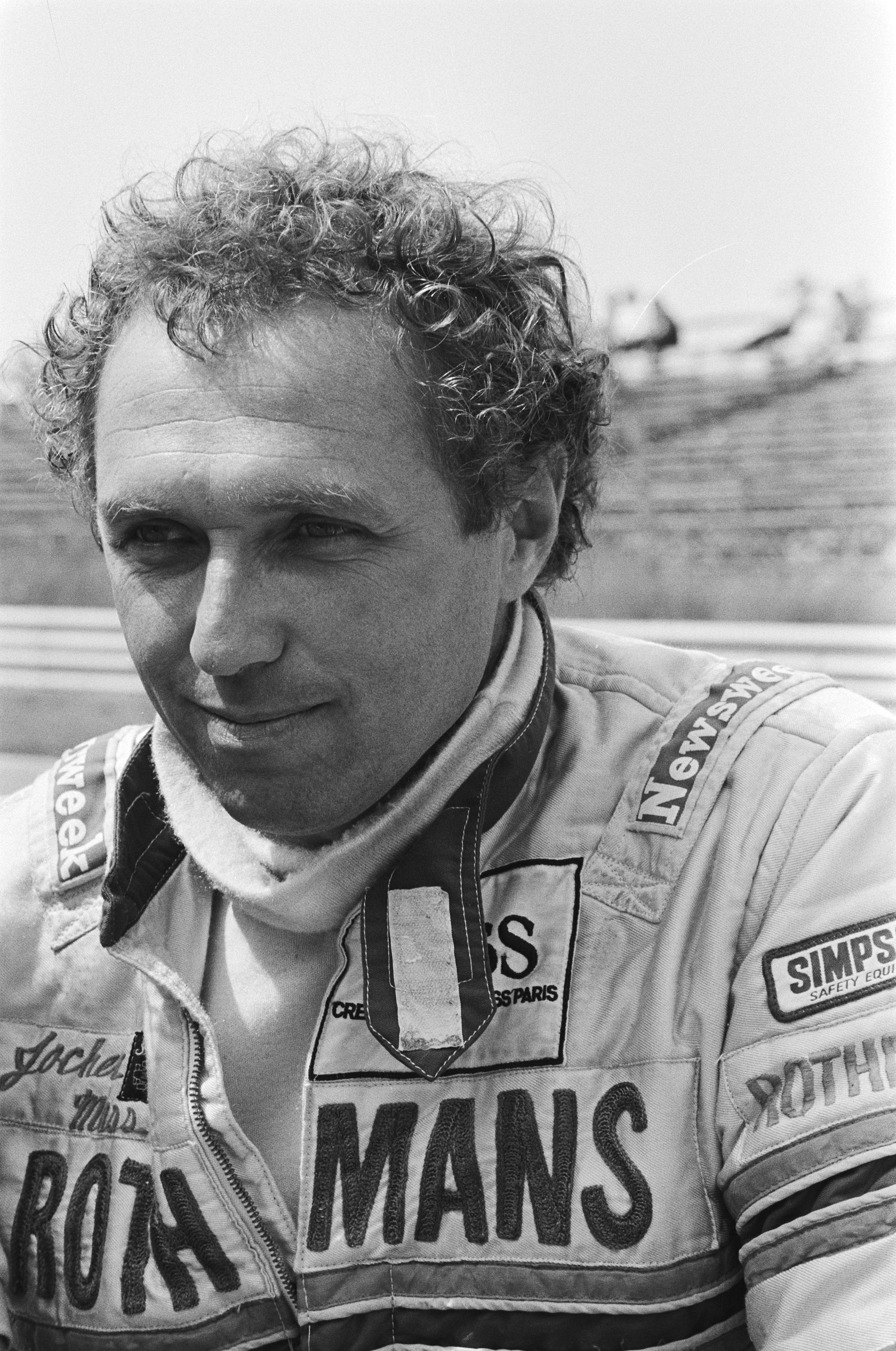
- Mass at the 1982 Dutch Grand Prix
- Born: Jochen Richard Mass; 30 September 1946; Dorfen, Bavaria, Germany
- Died: 4 May 2025 (aged 78); Cannes, Alpes-Maritimes, France
- Spouses: Esthéa Mellet; Bettina (m. 1994)
- Children: 4

Formula One World Championship career
- Nationality: (West Germany) West German
- Active years: 1973–1980, 1982
- Team(s): Surtees, McLaren, ATS, Arrows, March
- Entries: 114 (105 starts)
- Championships: 0
- Wins: 1
- Podiums: 8
- Career points: 71
- Pole positions: 0
- Fastest laps: 2
- First entry: 1973 British Grand Prix
- First win: 1975 Spanish Grand Prix
- Last entry: 1982 French Grand Prix

24 Hours of Le Mans career
- Years: 1972, 1978, 1981–1983, 1985–1989, 1991, 1995
- Teams: Ford, Martini, Porsche, Sauber, Price
- Best finish: 1st (1989)
- Class wins: 1 (1989)

Jochen Richard Mass (German pronunciation: [ˈjɔxn̩ ˈʁɪçaʁt maːs]; 30 September 1946 – 4 May 2025) was a German racing driver and broadcaster, who competed in Formula One from 1973 to 1982. Mass won the 1975 Spanish Grand Prix with McLaren. In endurance racing, Mass won the 24 Hours of Le Mans in 1989 with Sauber.

Born and raised in Bavaria, Mass made appearances in Formula Super Vee, Formula Three, and European Formula Two throughout his early career. He finished runner-up in the latter in 1973, having already taken victory at the 24 Hours of Spa alongside Hans-Joachim Stuck the year prior. Mass made his Formula One debut at the 1973 British Grand Prix with Surtees, making sporadic appearances before achieving a full-time seat in 1974. Mass moved to McLaren from the Canadian Grand Prix onwards, where he achieved his only race win at the curtailed 1975 Spanish Grand Prix. In his final season with McLaren in 1977, having taken several podiums with the team, Mass finished a career-best sixth in the World Drivers' Championship. After a non-classified championship finish in 1978 with ATS, Mass spent two seasons at Arrows. He was seriously injured at the 1980 Austrian Grand Prix, bruising his neck and fracturing vertebrae as his Arrows A3 rolled over during practice. After a year hiatus, Mass returned in 1982 with March. Following his crash with Mauro Baldi at the 1982 French Grand Prix—only two months after his involvement in the death of Gilles Villeneuve—Mass retired from Formula One, having achieved one win, two fastest laps, and eight podiums.

Outside Formula One, Mass entered 12 editions of the 24 Hours of Le Mans from 1972 to 1995, winning in 1989 alongside Manuel Reuter and Stanley Dickens, driving the Sauber C9, as well as finishing runner-up in the World Sportscar Championship, matching his result from 1984. He also finished runner-up at Le Mans in 1982 with Porsche. Mass was the champion of the Deutsche Rennsport Meisterschaft in 1985, as well as twice finishing runner-up in Interserie, all with Joest. Mass was also a race-winner in the British Saloon Car Championship. Upon retiring from motor racing, Mass became a commentator for RTL from 1993 to 1997. Mass made frequent appearances at Goodwood events from the 1990s onwards, including the Festival of Speed and the Revival. In popular culture, Mass appeared as himself in Rush (2013).

== Early life ==
Jochen Richard Mass was born on 30 September 1946 in Dorfen, Bavaria. His father's family came from Mecklenburg, where his grandfather worked as a ship captain. This led to Mass working on ships of the Merchant navy after leaving school, which started a lifelong passion for boats and sailing. His interest in racing started late when he attended a hillclimbing race where his girlfriend worked as a steward. He then quit working on a ship and started an apprenticeship at an Alfa Romeo dealership in Mannheim. The owner, who entered Alfas in numerous racing events, saw Mass' talent which started his racing career.

== Career ==
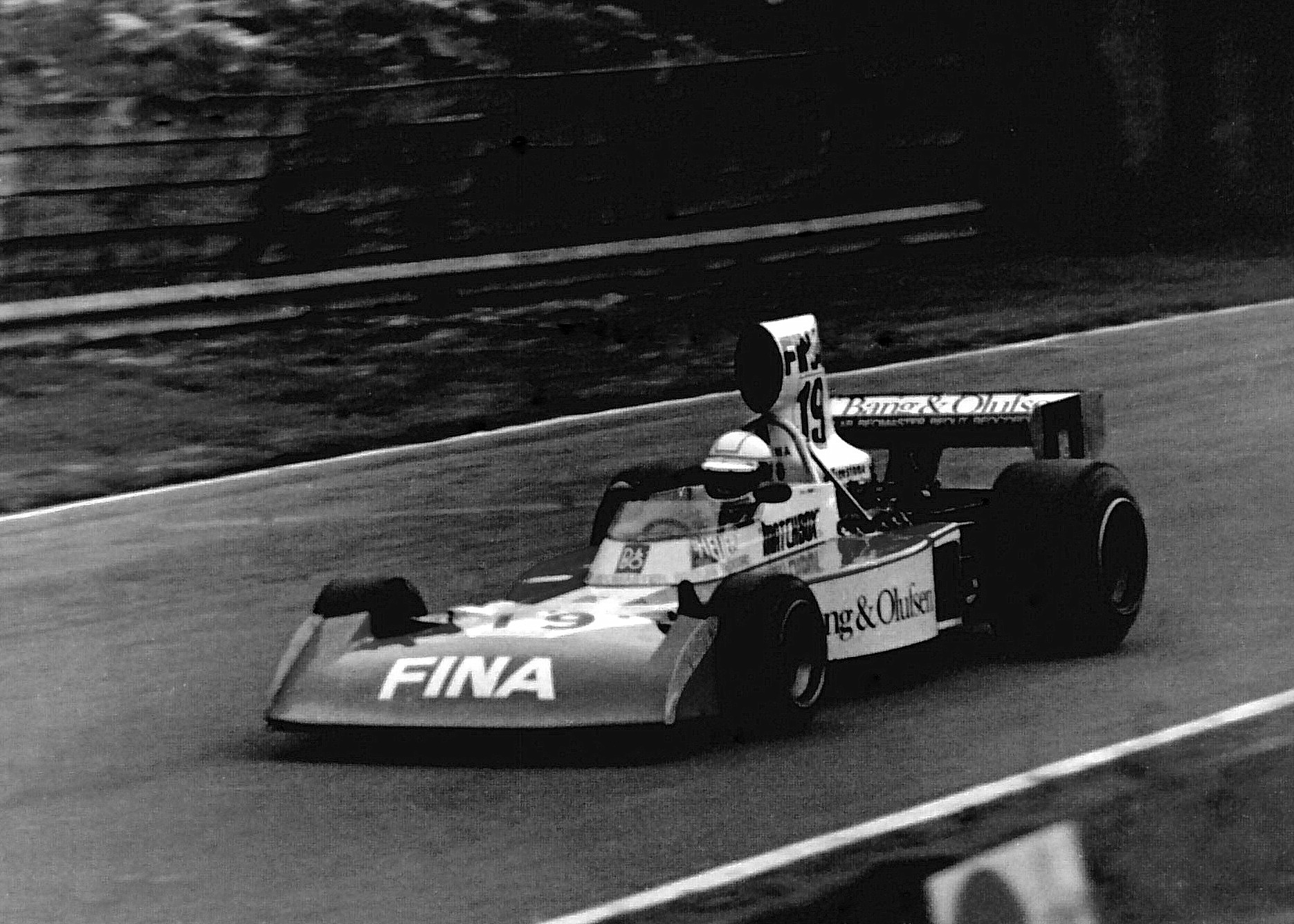
Mass driving for Surtees at the 1974 British Grand Prix at Brands Hatch

Mass participated in 114 Formula One World Championship Grands Prix, debuting on 14 July 1973 at the British Grand Prix. He won one GP race (1975 Spanish Grand Prix), secured no pole positions, achieved eight podiums and scored a total of 71 championship points.

On 8 May 1982, Mass was involved in an incident with Gilles Villeneuve which led to the latter's death. With only 10 minutes left until the end of the qualifying session for the 1982 Belgian Grand Prix at Zolder, Villeneuve collided with Mass while attempting to overtake him. As Villeneuve came up behind Mass exiting a super-fast left turn, Mass moved to the right hand side of the track to let Villeneuve through. Villeneuve had already committed to the right hand side and the two cars touched wheels, launching the Canadian skyward. Villeneuve's car hit the ground nose-first and was then torn apart in a series of violent cartwheels. His seat was dislodged and he was flung from his car, landing heavily among the catch fencing at the opposite side of the track. Mass stopped his car, jumped out and ran back to Villeneuve's wrecked car. Villeneuve was flown to hospital and taken off life-support later that evening.

In addition to Formula One, Mass enjoyed great success in sports car racing, gaining international prominence with his performance during the European Touring Car Championship in the early 1970s. In 1972, he teamed up with Hans-Joachim Stuck to drive a Ford Capri RS2600 to victory at the Spa 24 Hours endurance race in Belgium. He went on to win that year's World Sportscar Championship. He finished second to Clay Regazzoni and Arturo Merzario in a November 1972 9-hour race at the Kyalami Circuit, in Johannesburg, South Africa. Mass' co-driver in a Chevron B-21 was Gerry Birrell. Mass, driving a Surtees TS-15, tied with Jean Pierre Beltoise in qualifying for the Jim Clark Memorial Formula Two auto race in April 1973 held at Hockenheim, both drivers recording times of 2 minutes, 2.8 seconds, for an average of 124.3 miles per hour.

Mass placed second to Jean-Pierre Jarier in a Formula Two race at Nivelles, in June 1973. He had finished second in the first heat and third in the second. In his first Formula One race at the 1973 British Grand Prix he wasn't able to complete a lap, because he, as well as his two Surtees teammates, were part of the multi-car-collision that led to the end of Andrea de Adamich's career. He completed his first Formula One race at the 1973 German Grand Prix at the Nürburgring. Mass came in seventh in a Surtees.

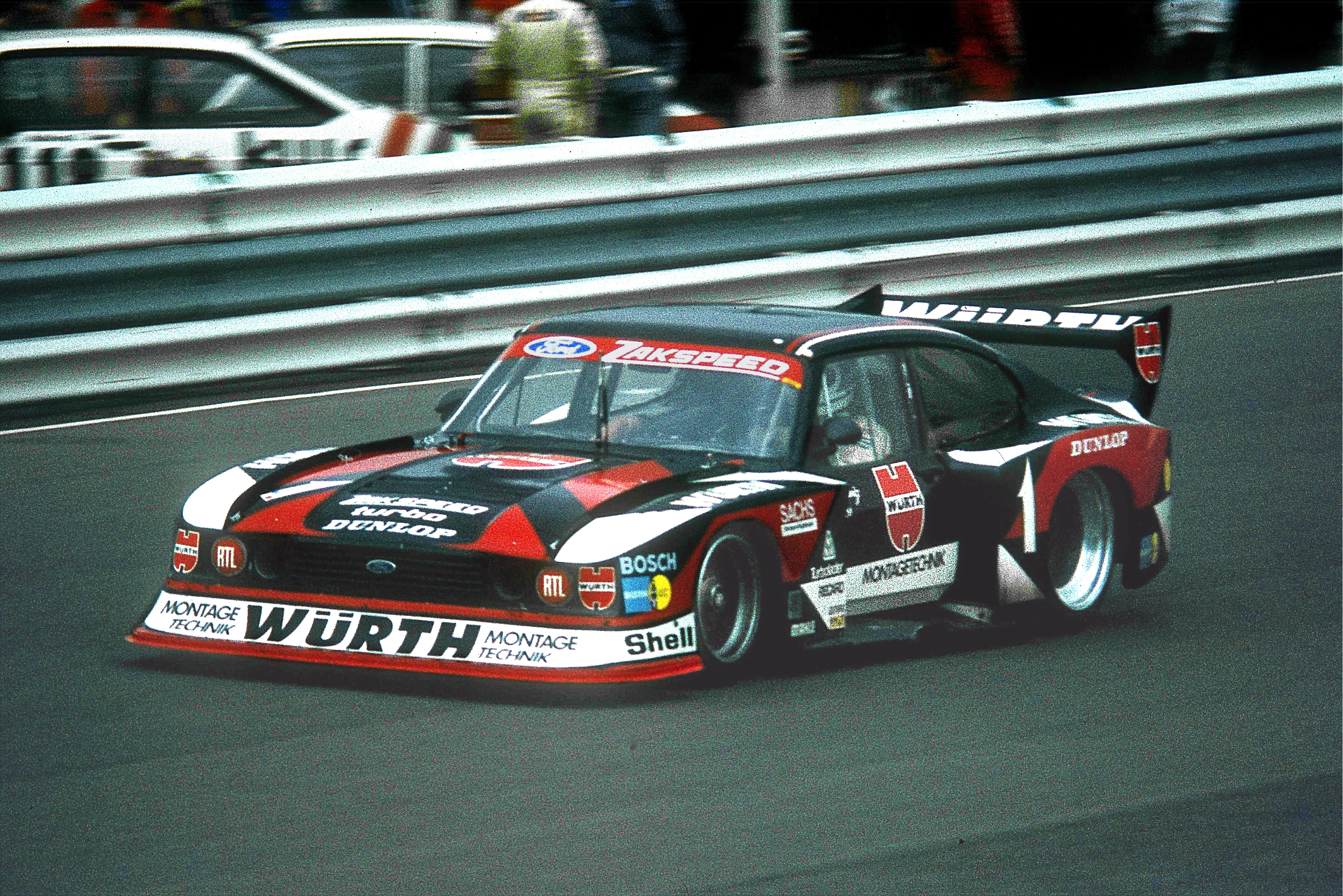
Mass with Ford Capri Turbo at the Nürburgring in 1980

After driving three races for them in 1973, Mass secured a full-time ride with Surtees for the 1974 season. Mass soon was unhappy with the team, because John Surtees couldn't afford to pay him regularly and they were using cheap, low-quality material for the car which broke constantly. At the 1974 Monaco Grand Prix qualifying a part of the right rear suspension broke on his TS16. Mass blamed it on faulty material, while John Surtees insisted that Mass hit the wall somewhere on the track. Mass subsequently refused to start the race. He continued to race for the team for five more races until John Surtees agreed to let him out of his contract and Mass went on to sign with McLaren. At the last race of the season at Watkins Glen, his replacement at Surtees, Helmut Koinigg, whom Mass warned about the car on the flight to North America, died in an accident caused by suspension failure.

Mass drove a McLaren-Ford to third place in the 1975 Brazilian Grand Prix at Interlagos.

Mass won the 1975 Spanish Grand Prix after leader, Rolf Stommelen's car hit a protective barrier, exploded into flames, and catapulted into the crowd at the Montjuich circuit. Four spectators were killed and twelve were injured. Stommelen suffered multiple fractures and was in critical condition after the accident, taking three months to fully recover. Mass was declared the winner in his Texaco McLaren-Ford, when the race was stopped immediately after the accident (being the last win for a German driver for the next 17 years, until the 1992 Belgian Grand Prix with Michael Schumacher).

Merzario and Mass led an Alfa Romeo sweep of the first two positions in the 1975 Coppa Florio manufacturers championship automobile race at Pergusa. Mass was third in the 1975 French Grand Prix at Le Castellet. On lap 38 he broke the record set by Denny Hulme, clocking a time of 1:50.60 over the 3.61-mile circuit. Mass and Jacky Ickx teamed in a Porsche to claim victory in the Dijon Six-Hour Race. Mass won the eighth and final race of the 1976 World Sports Car Championship series. He completed the 4.2 kilometre, Salzburg course in 1 hour, 28 minutes, 25.24 seconds, with an average speed of 125 m.p.h.

At the 1976 German Grand Prix, Mass was in a good position to win his home Grand Prix. He was the only one to start on dry tires on a partially wet Nordschleife. The track dried and after the second lap he led with a good margin after the other drivers all needed to pit for dry tires. The race was stopped after the severe accident of Niki Lauda and restarted in dry conditions which eliminated Mass's advantage and he finished 3rd, while his teammate James Hunt won the race.

Mass and Ickx drove a Porsche 935 in the 1977 24 Hours of Daytona endurance race. Mass was clocked at 126.477 m.p.h. around the 3.84 mile Daytona road course. Mass won both 20-lap heats of the 1977 Jim Clark Memorial race in Hockenheim. He drove a March-BMW.

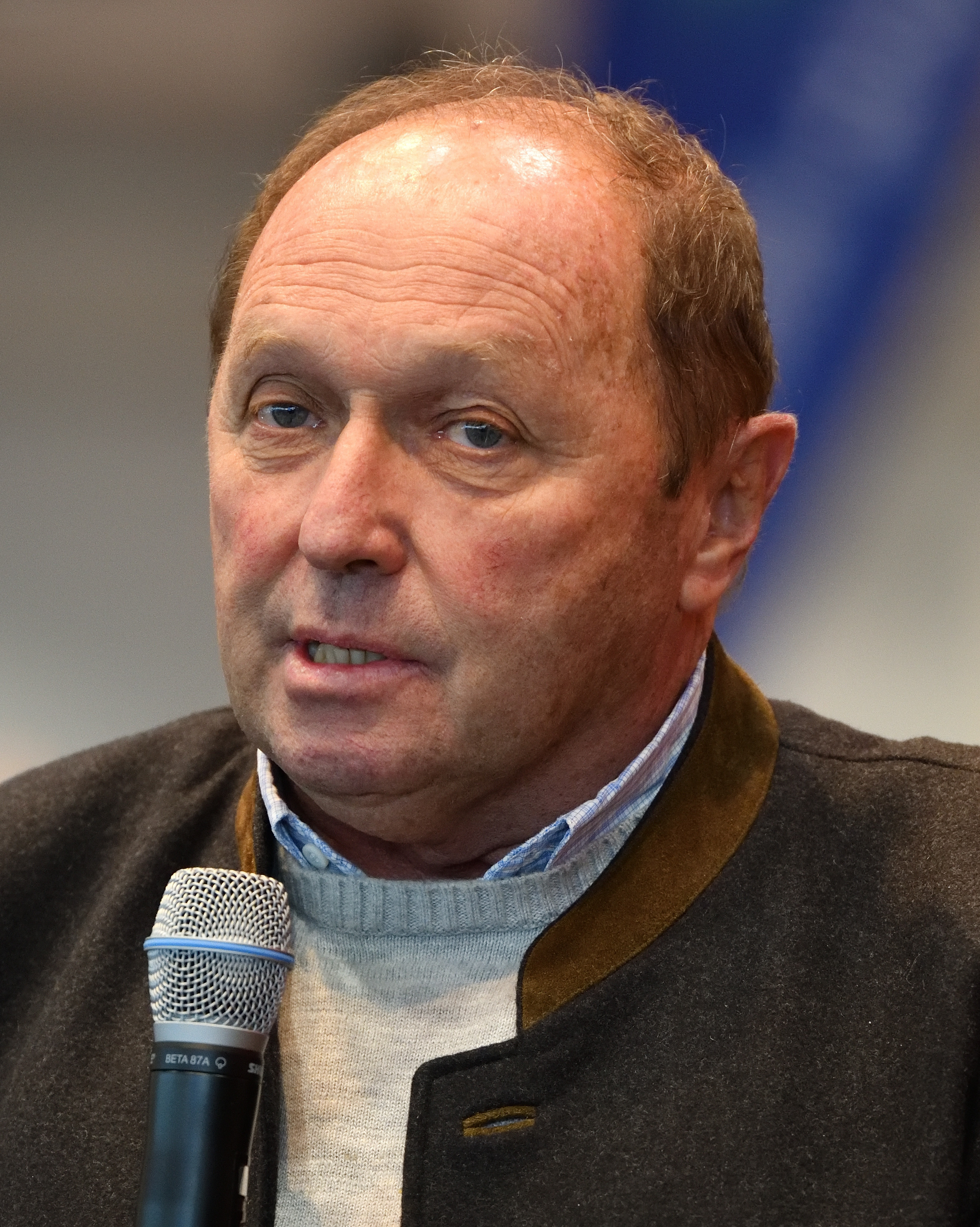
Mass in 2017

After the 1977 season, Mass left McLaren and signed with the ATS team, because of his good relationship with Robin Herd who was hired as the technical director. Herd left the team early in the season after disagreements with team owner Günter Schmid. Mass' season proved disastrous, scoring no points, failing to qualify for three races and having to sit out the last three races after breaking his leg during testing. He subsequently left the team and moved to Arrows for 1979 season.

During his two seasons with Arrows, Mass recorded five points finishes. His best showings were at the two Monaco GPs. In 1979 he was on road to a podium finish around 15 seconds behind the leading Ferraris when his brakes failed. After a lengthy repair pit stop he still finished sixth albeit seven laps down. In 1980 he recorded his best non-McLaren F1 finish there with a fourth place.

Mass' Arrows turned over several times at the 1980 Austrian Grand Prix at Zeltweg. He bruised his neck and wrenched a vertebra but was able to leave the hospital.

Mass was convinced to stop racing Formula One cars after an accident with Mauro Baldi at the 1982 French Grand Prix at Paul Ricard. His March and the Arrows of Baldi touched at maximum speeds, both cars flying off the track and through a containment fence. Mass's car continued, hitting a tyre-lined guardrail. The March finally came to rest upside down and on fire, almost halfway into a spectator area. Amazingly he escaped with light burns only, and Baldi was uninjured.

Among his many victories, in 1985, Mass won the Circuito del Mugello 1,000 km race in Italy driving a Porsche 962C and in 1987 partnered with Bobby Rahal to claim victory at the 1987 12 Hours of Sebring race.

Mass won the Porsche Cup, an annual award presented by Porsche AG to recognize the world's most successful privateer racing driver competing with Porsche machinery in a customer racing team, in 1985.

Mass and Bobby Rahal combined to win the Champion Spark Plug Grand Prix at the Mid-Ohio Sports Car Course in Lexington, Ohio. Driving a Porsche 962, they inherited the lead 18 laps from the end. Mass won the 24 Hours of Le Mans in 1989, driving a Sauber Mercedes C9. It was the second triumph for Mercedes-Benz at Le Mans, their previous win having come in 1952. At Sauber, he served as a mentor to their stable of young drivers including Michael Schumacher, Heinz-Harald Frentzen and Karl Wendlinger.

Mass drove the Mercedes-Benz museum's historic cars. In the 2004 Mille Miglia, he drove the original Mercedes-Benz 300 SLR that Stirling Moss had driven to victory in the 1955 race. To raise money for charity, the passenger seat next to him was auctioned off to the highest bidder.

From 1993 to 1997, Mass was a Formula One co-commentator for the German broadcaster RTL.

Mass played himself in Ron Howard's 2013 film Rush.

== Personal life and death ==
During his racing career, Mass resided in Monaco. He later lived in Southern France with his wife Bettina. He had two sons with his first wife Esti and two daughters with Bettina.

Mass died in Cannes, France on 4 May 2025 due to complications from a stroke that he suffered in February of the same year. He was 78.

== Racing record ==
=== Career summary ===
Season	Series	Team	Races	Wins	Poles	F/Laps	Podiums	Points	Position
1971	European Formula Super Vee		?	?	?	?	?	15	6th
1971	European Touring Car Championship		?	?	?	?	?	13	14th
1971	Shellsport National British Formula Three		3	0	0	0	1	16	5th
1972	European Formula Two	STP March Racing Team	4	0	0	0	0	1	27th
1972	24 Hours of Le Mans	Ford Motor Company Deutschland	1	0	0	0	0	N/A	DNF
1972	British Saloon Car Championship	Ford Köln	1	1	0	0	1	9	28th
1972	British Saloon Car Championship − Class D	Ford Köln	1	1	0	0	1	9	7th
1973	European Formula Two	Team Surtees	13	2	2	3	6	42	**2nd**
1973	Formula One	Team Surtees	3	0	0	0	0	N/A	NC
1973	British Saloon Car Championship	Ford Köln	1	0	0	1	1	6	29th
1973	British Saloon Car Championship − Class D	Ford Köln	1	0	0	1	1	6	8th
1974	Formula One	Team Surtees	10	0	0	0	0	0	NC
1974	Formula One	Yardley McLaren	2	0	0	0	0	0	NC
1975	Formula One	Marlboro Team Texaco	14	1	0	1	4	20	8th
1976	Formula One	Marlboro Team McLaren	16	0	0	1	2	19	9th
1976	European Formula Two	Project Four Racing	0	0	0	0	0	0	NC^{‡}
1976	European Formula Two	Willi Kauhsen Racing Team	1	0	0	0	0	0	NC^{‡}
1976	European Formula Two	Fred Opert Racing	1	0	0	0	0	0	NC^{‡}
1977	Formula One	Marlboro Team McLaren	17	0	0	0	2	25	6th
1977	European Formula Two	March Racing Ltd Yardley	2	2	1	1	2	0	NC^{‡}
1978	Formula One	ATS Racing	10	0	0	0	0	0	NC
1978	European Formula Two	ICI Chevron Cars	3	0	0	0	0	0	NC
1978	24 Hours of Le Mans	Martini Racing Porsche System	1	0	0	0	0	N/A	DNF
1979	Formula One	Warsteiner Arrows Racing Team	13	0	0	0	0	3	18th
1980	Formula One	Warsteiner Arrows Racing Team Warsteiner Arrows Racing with Penthouse Rizla+.	11	0	0	0	0	4	17th
1981	24 Hours of Le Mans	Porsche System	1	0	0	0	0	N/A	12th
1982	Formula One	March Grand Prix Team Rothmans Racing with March Grand Prix	9	0	0	0	0	0	NC
1982	24 Hours of Le Mans	Rothmans Porsche	1	0	0	0	1	N/A	**2nd**
1983	24 Hours of Le Mans	Rothmans Porsche	1	0	0	0	0	N/A	DNF
1985	24 Hours of Le Mans	Rothmans Porsche	1	0	0	0	0	N/A	10th
1986	24 Hours of Le Mans	Rothmans Porsche	1	0	0	0	0	N/A	DNF
1987	24 Hours of Le Mans	Rothmans Porsche AG	1	0	0	0	0	N/A	DNF
1988	24 Hours of Le Mans	Team Sauber Mercedes	0	0	0	0	0	N/A	DNS
1989	24 Hours of Le Mans	Team Sauber Mercedes	1	0	0	0	1	N/A	**1st**
1991	24 Hours of Le Mans	Team Sauber Mercedes	1	0	0	0	0	N/A	DNF
1995	24 Hours of Le Mans	West Competition / David Price Racing	1	0	0	0	0	N/A	DNF

^{‡} Graded drivers not eligible for European Formula Two Championship points

=== Complete European Formula Two Championship results ===
(key) (Races in bold indicate pole position; races in italics indicate fastest lap)

Year	Entrant	Chassis	Engine	1	2	3	4	5	6	7	8	9	10	11	12	13	14	15	16	17	Pos.	Pts
1972	STP March Racing Team	March 722	Ford BDA	MAL	THR	HOC; Ret	PAU; Ret	PAL; 8	HOC	ROU; Ret	ÖST	IMO	MAN	PER	SAL	ALB	HOC				27th	1
1973	Team Surtees FINA	Surtees TS15	Ford BDA	MAL; Ret	HOC; Ret	THR; DSQ	NÜR; Ret	PAU	**KIN**; 1	NIV; 2	**HOC**; 1	ROU; 2	MNZ; Ret	MAN; 2	KAR	PER; 3	SAL	NOR	ALB; 6	VLL; Ret	2nd	42
1976	Project Four Racing	March 762	Lancia-Ferrari	HOC; DNQ	THR	VLL	SAL	PAU													NC	0^{‡}
1976	Willi Kauhsen Racing Team	March 762	Hart						HOC; Ret	ROU	MUG	PER	EST	NOG							NC	0^{‡}
1976	Fred Opert Racing	Chevron B40	BMW												HOC; 6						NC	0^{‡}
1977	March Racing Ltd Yardley	March 772P	BMW	SIL	THR	**HOC**; 1	NÜR; 1	VLL	PAU	MUG	ROU	NOG	PER	MIS	EST	DON					NC	0^{‡}
1978	ICI Chevron Cars	Chevron B42	Hart	THR; 12	HOC; 7	NÜR; 8	PAU	MUG	VAL	ROU	DON	NOG	PER	MIS	HOC						NC	0

^{‡} Graded drivers not eligible for European Formula Two Championship points

=== 24 Hours of Le Mans results ===
Year	Team	Co-Drivers	Car	Class	Laps	Pos.	Class Pos.
1972	(Germany) Ford Motor Company Deutschland	(Germany) Hans-Joachim Stuck	Ford Capri 2600RS	S 3.0	152	DNF	DNF
1978	(Germany) Martini Racing Porsche System	(Belgium) Jacky Ickx (France) Henri Pescarolo	Porsche 936/78	S +2.0	255	DNF	DNF
1981	(Germany) Porsche System	(Australia) Vern Schuppan (United States) Hurley Haywood	Porsche 936	S +2.0	312	12th	**2nd**
1982	(Germany) Rothmans Porsche System	(Australia) Vern Schuppan	Porsche 956	C	356	**2nd**	**2nd**
1983	(Germany) Rothmans Porsche	(Germany) Stefan Bellof	Porsche 956	C	281	DNF	DNF
1985	(Germany) Rothmans Porsche	(Belgium) Jacky Ickx	Porsche 962C	C1	348	10th	10th
1986	(Germany) Rothmans Porsche	(France) Bob Wollek (Australia) Vern Schuppan	Porsche 962C	C1	180	DNF	DNF
1987	(Germany) Rothmans Porsche AG	(France) Bob Wollek (Australia) Vern Schuppan	Porsche 962C	C1	16	DNF	DNF
1988	(Switzerland) Team Sauber Mercedes	(Italy) Mauro Baldi (United Kingdom) James Weaver	Sauber C9-Mercedes-Benz	C1	–	DNS	DNS
1989	(Germany) Team Sauber Mercedes	(Germany) Manuel Reuter (Sweden) Stanley Dickens	Sauber C9-Mercedes-Benz	C1	389	**1st**	**1st**
1991	(Germany) Team Sauber Mercedes	(France) Jean-Louis Schlesser (France) Alain Ferté	Mercedes-Benz C11	C2	319	DNF	DNF
1995	(United Kingdom) West Competition (United Kingdom) David Price Racing	(Denmark) John Nielsen (Germany) Dr. Thomas Bscher	McLaren F1 GTR	GT1	131	DNF	DNF

=== Complete British Saloon Car Championship results ===
(key) (Races in bold indicate pole position; races in italics indicate fastest lap.)

Year	Team	Car	Class	1	2	3	4	5	6	7	8	9	10	Pos.	Pts	Class
1972	Ford Köln	Ford Capri RS2600	D	BRH	OUL	THR	SIL	CRY	BRH	OUL	SIL ovr:1 cls:1	MAL	BRH	28th	9	7th
1973	Ford Köln	Ford Capri RS2600	D	BRH	SIL	THR	THR	SIL	ING	BRH	SIL ovr:2 cls:2	BRH		29th	6	8th

=== Complete Formula One World Championship results ===
(key) (races in italics indicate fastest lap)

Year	Entrant	Chassis	Engine	1	2	3	4	5	6	7	8	9	10	11	12	13	14	15	16	17	WDC	Points
1973	Team Surtees	Surtees TS14A	Ford Cosworth DFV 3.0 V8	ARG	BRA	RSA	ESP	BEL	MON	SWE	FRA	GBR; Ret	NED	GER; 7	AUT	ITA	CAN	USA; Ret			NC	0
1974	Team Surtees	Surtees TS16	Ford Cosworth DFV 3.0 V8	ARG; Ret	BRA; 17																NC	0
1974	Bang & Olufsen Team Surtees	Surtees TS16	Ford Cosworth DFV 3.0 V8			RSA; Ret	ESP; Ret	BEL; Ret	MON; DNS	SWE; Ret	NED; Ret	FRA; Ret	GBR; 14	GER; Ret	AUT	ITA					NC	0
1974	Yardley McLaren	McLaren M23B	Ford Cosworth DFV 3.0 V8														CAN; 16	USA; 7			NC	0
1975	Marlboro Team Texaco	McLaren M23C	Ford Cosworth DFV 3.0 V8	ARG; 14	BRA; 3	RSA; 6	ESP; 1^{‡}	MON; 6	BEL; Ret	SWE; Ret	NED; Ret	FRA; 3	GBR; 7	GER; Ret	AUT; 4^{‡}	ITA; Ret	USA; 3				8th	20
1976	Marlboro Team McLaren	McLaren M23D	Ford Cosworth DFV 3.0 V8	BRA; 6	RSA; 3	USW; 5	ESP; Ret	BEL; 6	MON; 5	SWE; 11	FRA; 15	GBR; Ret	GER; 3	AUT; 7		ITA; Ret	CAN; 5	USA; 4	JPN; Ret		9th	19
1976	Marlboro Team McLaren	McLaren M26	Ford Cosworth DFV 3.0 V8												NED; 9						9th	19
1977	Marlboro Team McLaren	McLaren M23E	Ford Cosworth DFV 3.0 V8	ARG; Ret	BRA; Ret	RSA; 5	USW; Ret	ESP; 4	MON; 4	BEL; Ret	SWE; 2	FRA; 9									6th	25
1977	Marlboro Team McLaren	McLaren M26	Ford Cosworth DFV 3.0 V8										GBR; 4	GER; Ret	AUT; 6	NED; Ret	ITA; 4	USA; Ret	CAN; 3	JPN; Ret	6th	25
1978	ATS Racing	ATS HS1	Ford Cosworth DFV 3.0 V8	ARG; 11	BRA; 7	RSA; Ret	USW; Ret	MON; DNQ	BEL; 11	ESP; 9	SWE; 13	FRA; 13	GBR; NC	GER; Ret	AUT; DNQ	NED; DNQ	ITA	USA	CAN		NC	0
1979	Warsteiner Arrows Racing Team	Arrows A1	Ford Cosworth DFV 3.0 V8	ARG; 8	BRA; 7	RSA; 12	USW; 9	ESP; 8	BEL; Ret	MON; 6											18th	3
1979	Warsteiner Arrows Racing Team	Arrows A2	Ford Cosworth DFV 3.0 V8								FRA; 15	GBR; Ret	GER; 6	AUT; Ret	NED; 6	ITA; Ret	CAN; DNQ	USA; DNQ			18th	3
1980	Warsteiner Arrows Racing Team	Arrows A3	Ford Cosworth DFV 3.0 V8	ARG; Ret	BRA; 10	RSA; 6	USW; 7	BEL; Ret	MON; 4	FRA; 10	GBR; 13	GER; 8	AUT; DNQ	NED; DNS	ITA						17th	4
1980	Warsteiner Arrows Racing with Penthouse Rizla+.	Arrows A3	Ford Cosworth DFV 3.0 V8													CAN; 11	USA; Ret				17th	4
1982	March Grand Prix Team	March 821	Ford Cosworth DFV 3.0 V8	RSA; 12																	NC	0
1982	Rothmans Racing with March Grand Prix	March 821	Ford Cosworth DFV 3.0 V8		BRA; 8	USW; 8	SMR	BEL; Ret	MON; DNQ	DET; 7	CAN; 11	NED; Ret	GBR; 10	FRA; Ret	GER	AUT	SUI	ITA	CPL		NC	0

^{‡} Half points awarded as less than 75% of race distance was completed.

=== Complete Formula One non-championship results ===
(key)

Year	Entrant	Chassis	Engine	1	2	3
1974	Team Surtees	Surtees TS16	Ford Cosworth DFV 3.0 V8	PRE; 4	ROC; DNS	INT; 2
1975	Marlboro Team Texaco	McLaren M23C	Ford Cosworth DFV 3.0 V8	ROC; Ret	INT	SUI; 3
1979	Warsteiner Arrows Racing Team	Arrows A1	Ford Cosworth DFV 3.0 V8	ROC; 4	GNM	DIN
1980	Warsteiner Arrows Racing Team	Arrows A3	Ford Cosworth DFV 3.0 V8	ESP; 2		

== See also ==
- Formula One drivers from Germany

Sporting positions
Preceded by Dieter Glemser	European Touring Car Champion; 1972	Succeeded by Toine Hezemans
Preceded by Stefan Bellof	Deutsche Rennsport Meisterschaft; Champion; 1985	Succeeded by End series
Preceded by Jan Lammers; Johnny Dumfries; Andy Wallace	Winner of the 24 Hours of Le Mans; 1989; With: Manuel Reuter & Stanley Dickens	Succeeded by John Nielsen; Price Cobb; Martin Brundle
