= Shadow DN9 =

Formula One racing car

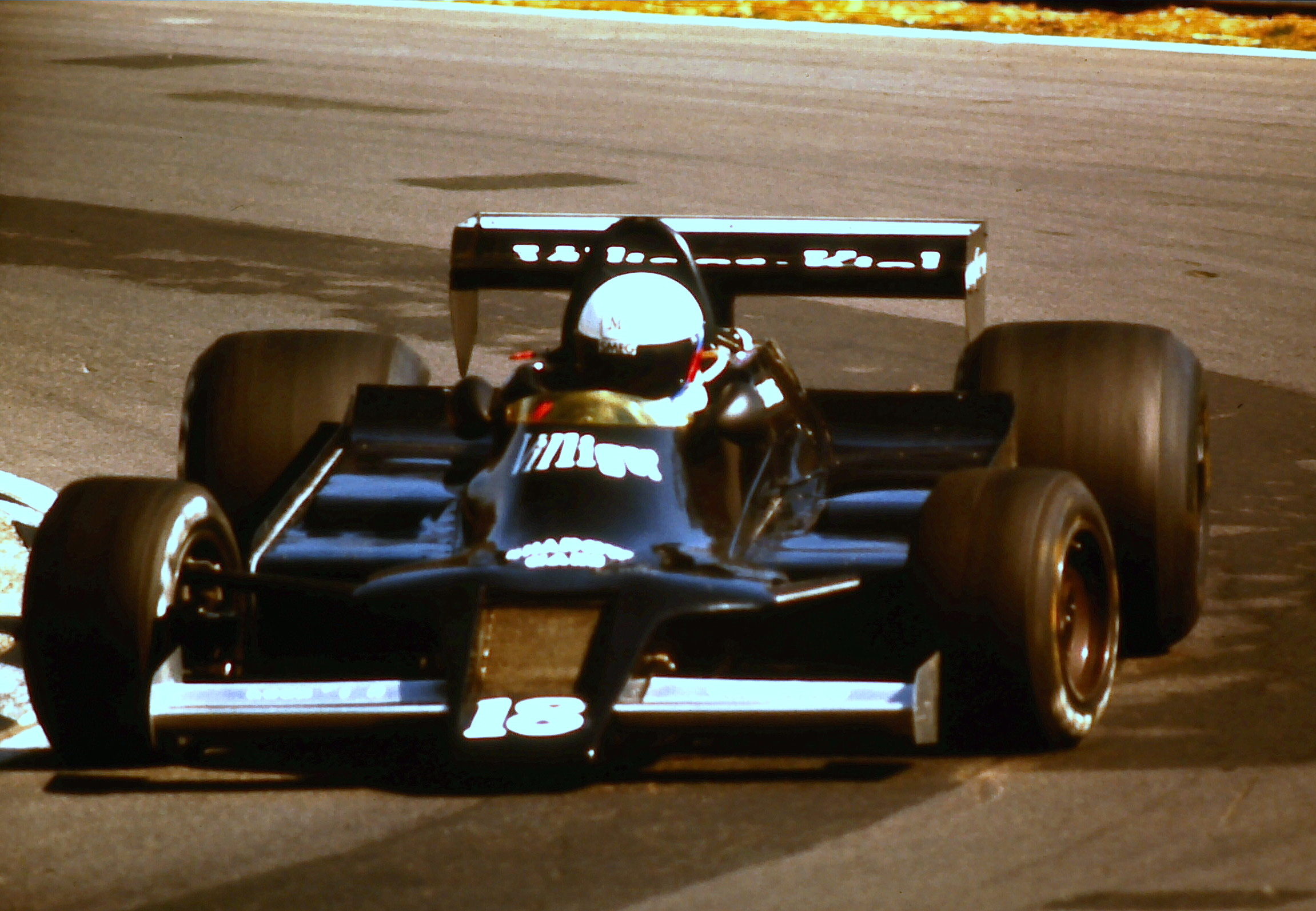
- Elio de Angelis driving the Shadow DN9B at Brands Hatch during the non-championship Race of Champions in 1979
- Category: Formula One
- Constructor: Shadow Racing Cars
- Designers: Tony Southgate; John Baldwin
- Predecessor: DN8
- Successor: DN11

Technical specifications
- Chassis: Aluminium monocoque
- Axle track: Front: 1,631 mm (64.2 in); Rear: 1,641 mm (64.6 in)
- Wheelbase: 2,642 mm (104.0 in)
- Engine: Cosworth DFV NA
- Transmission: Hewland FGA 400 5-speed manual
- Weight: 605 kg (1,334 lb)
- Fuel: FINA/Valvoline
- Tyres: Goodyear

Competition history
- Notable entrants: Shadow Racing Cars
- Notable drivers: (Italy) Elio de Angelis; (Switzerland) Clay Regazzoni; (Germany) Hans-Joachim Stuck
- Debut: 1978 United States Grand Prix West
| Races | Wins | Poles | F/Laps |
|---|---|---|---|
| 26 | 0 | 0 | 0 |
- Constructors' Championships: 0
- Drivers' Championships: 0

The Shadow DN9 was a Formula One car used by the Shadow team during the 1978 and 1979 Formula One seasons. It is most famous for having been copied by the new Arrows team for their FA1. Arrows, formed by a disgruntled group of Shadow's staffers, were in the end prohibited from using the design.

== Development ==
The DN9 was developed by Tony Southgate, returning to Shadow from Team Lotus. After racing the last three-quarters of the 1978 season, it returned for 1979. A new sponsor (Holland's Samson shag tobacco) necessitated a new paintjob and a series of wind tunnel tests and subsequent aerodynamic improvements were carried out. New side skirts were introduced, helping to lower drag while doubling downforce.

== Racing history ==
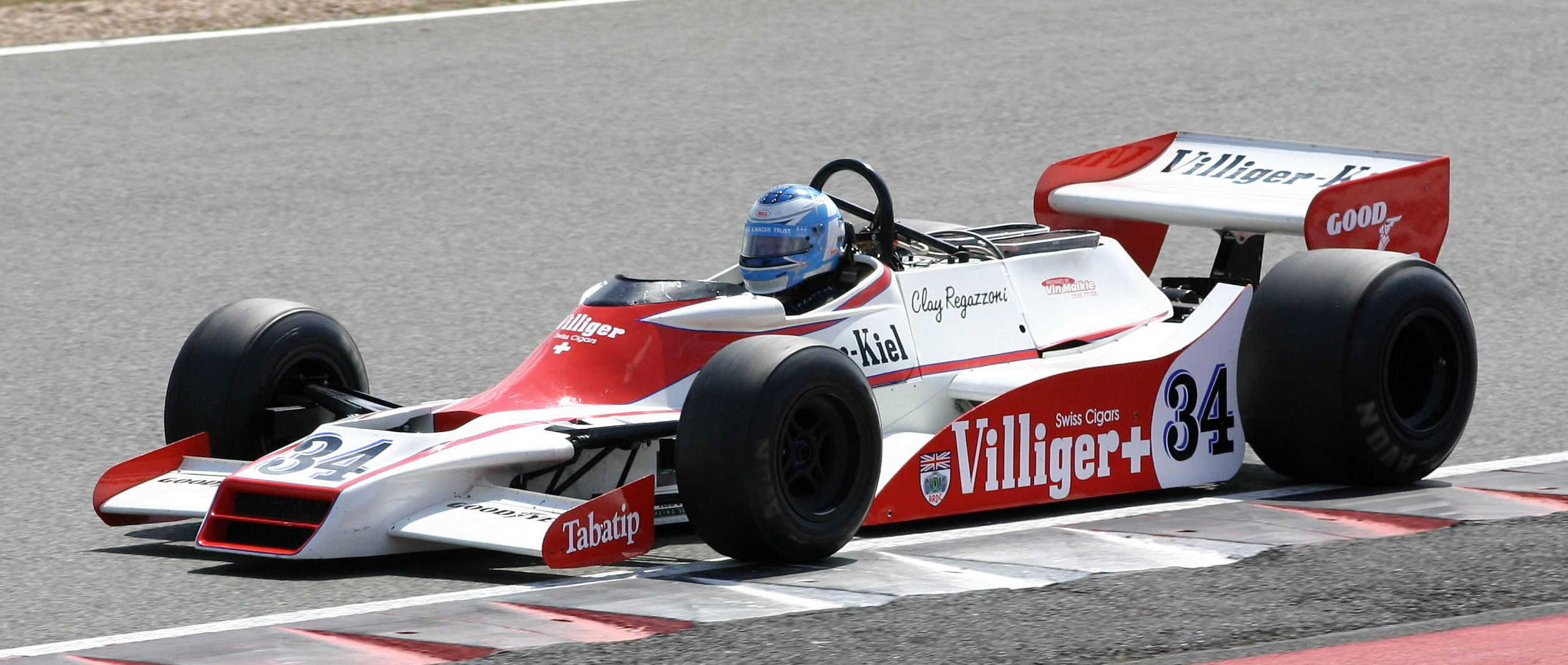
The DN9 in 1978 livery, as raced by Clay Regazzoni

The DN9 was introduced at the 1978 Long Beach Grand Prix for first driver Hans-Joachim Stuck's use, although he did not start the race. Second driver Clay Regazzoni got the new car for the race after (Monaco). Hawaiian driver Danny Ongais was also entered twice, by Interscope Racing, but failed pre-qualifying on both occasions. Ongais also tested at Silverstone, where he went faster than Lammers who was to become Shadow's second driver in 1979.

A disappointing 1978 meant using drivers of a lower caliber for 1979, with rookie drivers Elio de Angelis and Jan Lammers scoring only once, with de Angelis' surprise fourth place in the car's last race at the rainy 1979 United States Grand Prix. Interscope Racing, the privateer who had twice entered a DN9 in 1978, was the team fielding de Angelis, Shadow's de facto first driver. The choice of Dutchman Lammers was tied to the Shadows team's main sponsor, the Dutch Samson shag tobacco company.

== Complete Formula One World Championship results ==
(key) (Results in bold indicate pole position; results in italics indicate fastest lap.)

| Year | Entrant(s) | Engine(s) | Tyres | Drivers | 1 | 2 | 3 | 4 | 5 | 6 | 7 | 8 | 9 | 10 | 11 | 12 | 13 | 14 | 15 | 16 | Points | WCC |
|---|---|---|---|---|---|---|---|---|---|---|---|---|---|---|---|---|---|---|---|---|---|---|
| 1978 | Villiger Shadow | Ford V8 | G | | ARG | BRA | RSA | USW | MON | BEL | ESP | SWE | FRA | GBR | GER | AUT | NED | ITA | USA | CAN | **6*** | 11th |
| 1978 | Villiger Shadow | Ford V8 | G | Hans-Joachim Stuck | | | | DNS | Ret | Ret | Ret | 11 | 11 | 5 | Ret | Ret | Ret | Ret | Ret | Ret | **6*** | 11th |
| 1978 | Villiger Shadow | Ford V8 | G | Clay Regazzoni | | | | | DNQ | Ret | 15 | 5 | Ret | Ret | DNQ | NC | DNQ | NC | 14 | DNQ | **6*** | 11th |
| 1978 | Interscope Racing | Ford V8 | G | Danny Ongais | | | | DNPQ | | | | | | | | | DNPQ | | | | **6*** | 11th |
| 1979 | Samson Shadow Racing | Ford V8 | G | | ARG | BRA | RSA | USW | ESP | BEL | MON | FRA | GBR | GER | AUT | NED | ITA | CAN | USA | | **3** | 10th |
| 1979 | Samson Shadow Racing | Ford V8 | G | Jan Lammers | Ret | 14 | Ret | Ret | 12 | 10 | DNQ | 18 | 11 | 10 | Ret | Ret | DNQ | 9 | DNQ | | **3** | 10th |
| 1979 | Shadow Racing | Ford V8 | G | Elio de Angelis | 7 | 12 | Ret | 7 | Ret | Ret | DNQ | 16 | 12 | 11 | Ret | Ret | Ret | Ret | 4 | | **3** | 10th |

* 2 points scored in 1978 was with the DN8
