= Arrows A2 =

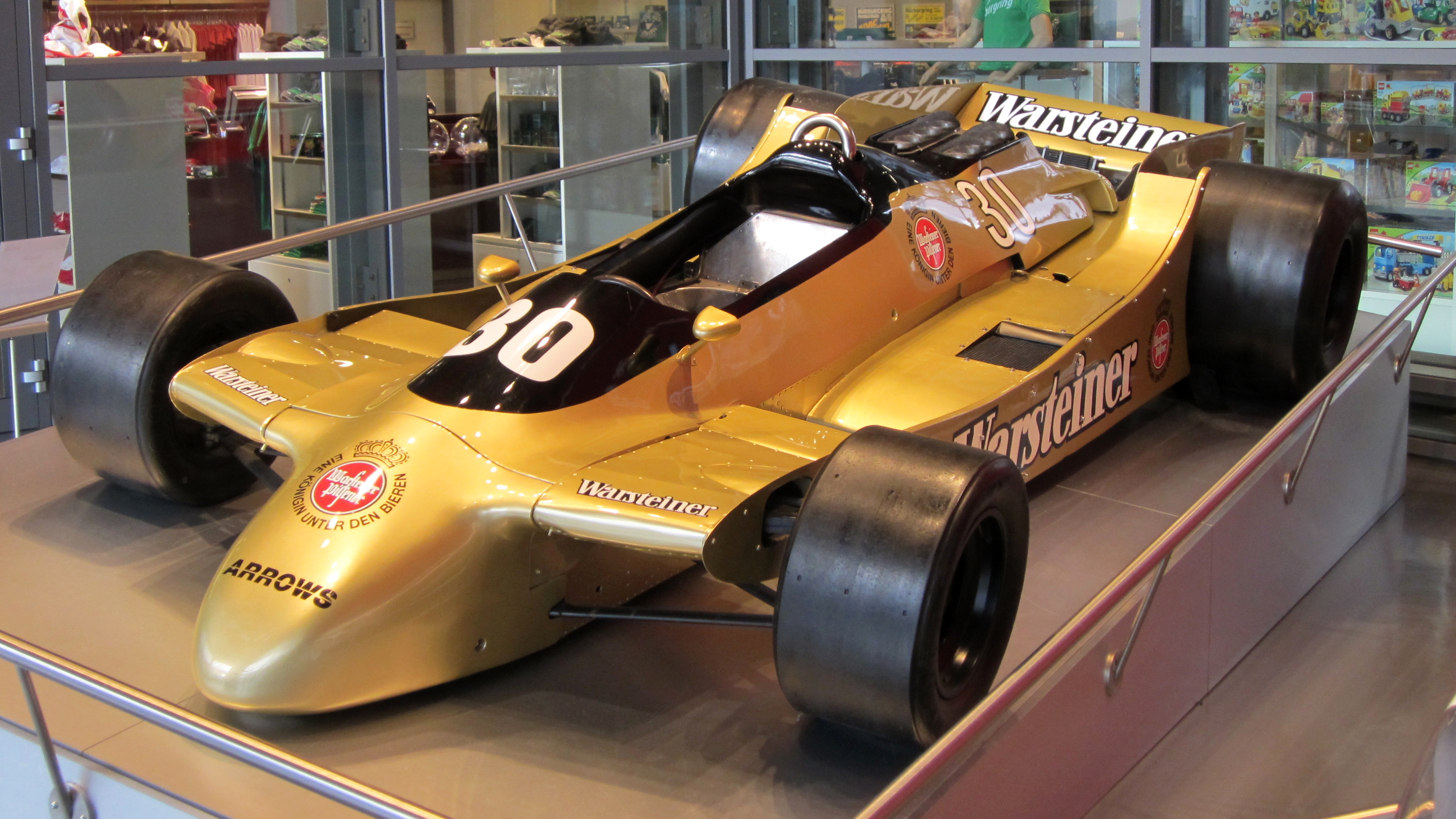
- The A2 of Jochen Mass on display at the Nürburgring Motorsport Museum
- Category: Formula One
- Constructor: Arrows
- Designers: Tony Southgate (Technical Director); Dave Wass (Chief Designer)
- Predecessor: A1B
- Successor: A3

Technical specifications
- Chassis: Riveted aluminium monocoque
- Suspension (front): Rocker arms, lower wishbones, inboard coil springs
- Suspension (rear): parallel bars, coil springs
- Axle track: Front: 1,153 mm (45.4 in); Rear: 1,549 mm (61.0 in)
- Wheelbase: 2,718 mm (107.0 in)
- Engine: Cosworth DFV, 2,993 cc (182.6 cu in), 90° V8, NA, mid-engine, longitudinally mounted
- Transmission: Hewland FGA 400 5-speed manual
- Weight: 591 kg (1,303 lb)
- Fuel: FINA
- Tyres: Goodyear

Competition history
- Notable entrants: Warsteiner Arrows Racing Team
- Notable drivers: 29. (Italy) Riccardo Patrese; 30. (West Germany) Jochen Mass
- Debut: 1979 French Grand Prix
- Last event: 1979 United States Grand Prix
Races	Wins	Poles	F/Laps
8	0	0	0
- Constructors' Championships: 0
- Drivers' Championships: 0

The Arrows A2 was a Formula One racing car, designed by Tony Southgate and Dave Wass, was used by the Arrows team in the latter half of the 1979 Formula One season. Powered by a Cosworth DFV V8 engine and driven by Riccardo Patrese and Jochen Mass, it was relatively unsuccessful with its best finish being sixth on two occasions.

== Design and development ==
For the 1979 season, Tony Southgate supervised the design and development of the Arrows A2. Unlike most contemporary cars, the engine, a Cosworth DFV V8 engine, and gearbox of the A2 were set at a four-degree angled incline. This enabled the use of aerodynamic underfloor sections across the full width of the chassis. This had the effect of raising the car's centre of gravity. The A2 generated extensive downforce, but at the expense of handling. Within weeks design work started on the A2's successor, the A3, and the previous year's car, the A1, was brought back for one final entry in the 1979 season.

== Race history ==
The A2 made its debut at the 1979 French Grand Prix but finished well down the field. Mass managed a pair of sixth places, at the German and Dutch Grands Prix.

== Complete Formula One World Championship results ==
(key)

Year	Entrant	Engine	Tyres	Drivers	1	2	3	4	5	6	7	8	9	10	11	12	13	14	15	Points	WCC
1979	Warsteiner Arrows	Ford Cosworth DFV	G		ARG	BRA	RSA	USW	ESP	BEL	MON	FRA	GBR	GER	AUT	NED	ITA	CAN	USA	5^{1}	9th
1979	Warsteiner Arrows	Ford Cosworth DFV	G	Riccardo Patrese								14	Ret	Ret	Ret	Ret	13		Ret	5^{1}	9th
1979	Warsteiner Arrows	Ford Cosworth DFV	G	Jochen Mass								15	Ret	6	Ret	6	Ret	DNQ	DNQ	5^{1}	9th

^1 3 points scored using the A1B.
