= Arrows FA1 =

Formula One car

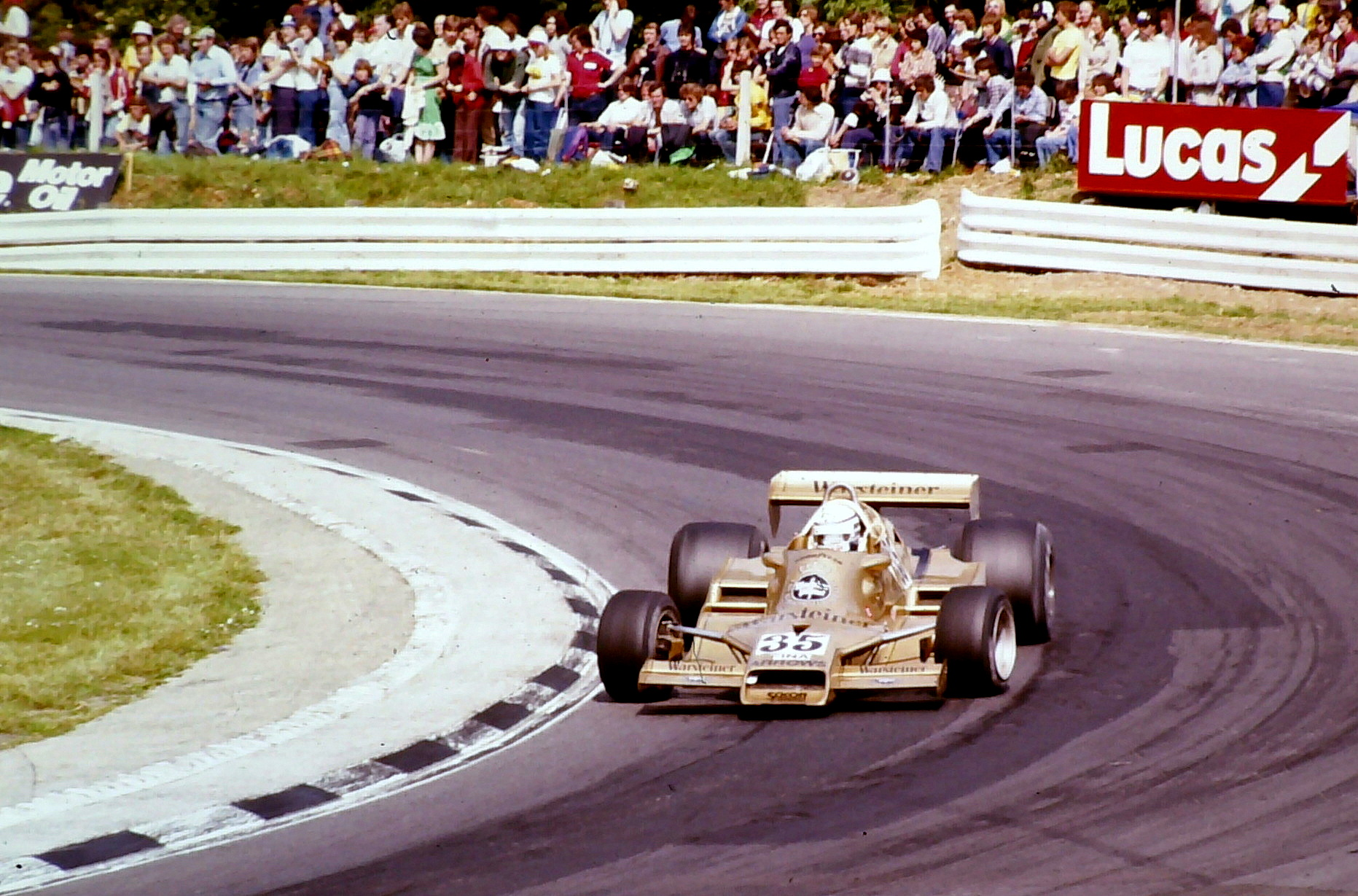
- Riccardo Patrese driving the FA1 at the 1978 British Grand Prix
- Category: Formula One
- Constructor: Arrows
- Designers: Tony Southgate (Technical Director); Dave Wass (Chief Designer)
- Successor: A1

Technical specifications
- Chassis: Aluminium monocoque
- Axle track: Front: 1,651 mm (65.0 in); Rear: 1,524 mm (60.0 in)
- Wheelbase: 2,590 mm (102 in)
- Engine: Cosworth DFV, 2,993 cc (182.6 cu in), 90° V8, NA, mid-engine, longitudinally mounted
- Transmission: Hewland FGA 400 5-speed manual
- Weight: 593 kg (1,307 lb)
- Fuel: FINA / Valvoline
- Tyres: Goodyear

Competition history
- Notable entrants: Arrows Grand Prix International
- Notable drivers: 35. (Italy) Riccardo Patrese; 36. (West Germany) Rolf Stommelen
- Debut: 1978 Brazilian Grand Prix
- Last event: 1978 German Grand Prix
Races	Wins	Podiums	Poles	F/Laps
10	0	1	0	0
- Constructors' Championships: 0
- Drivers' Championships: 0

The Arrows FA1 was a Formula One car used by the Arrows Grand Prix International team during the first half of the 1978 Formula One season.

== Design ==
The FA1 was in reality a Shadow DN9, which Tony Southgate had designed for Shadow whilst working as a consultant for them. Southgate mistakenly believed that because he had designed the Shadow DN9 whilst working as a consultant (and not a Shadow employee) that he owned the intellectual rights to the Shadow DN9 design. Based on this misconception, Arrows built the FA1, which was essentially a carbon copy of the DN9.

== Banning ==
The FA1 was banned by the London High Courts partway through the 1978 season after a legal protest from the Shadow team, on the grounds that the FA1 was a blatant copy of the DN9. The judgement handed down ruled that over 70% of the FA1 was identical to the DN9 and that all four Arrows FA1's should be broken up by Arrows and their parts handed over to the Shadow team.

Knowing it would lose the case, Arrows hurriedly designed and built a new car, the A1, whilst the court case was being heard and so did not miss a race.

== Complete Formula One World Championship results ==
(key) (Results in bold indicate pole position; results in italics indicate fastest lap)

Year	Entrant	Engine	Tyres	Drivers	1	2	3	4	5	6	7	8	9	10	11	12	13	14	15	16	Points	WCC
1978	Arrows Racing Team	Ford Cosworth DFV	**G**		ARG	BRA	RSA	USW	MON	BEL	ESP	SWE	FRA	GBR	GER	AUT	NED	ITA	USA	CAN	**11** ^{1}	**10th** ^{1}
1978	Arrows Racing Team	Ford Cosworth DFV	**G**	Riccardo Patrese		10	Ret	6	6	Ret	Ret	2	8	Ret	9						**11** ^{1}	**10th** ^{1}
1978	Arrows Racing Team	Ford Cosworth DFV	**G**	Rolf Stommelen			9	9	Ret	Ret	14	14	15	DNQ	DSQ						**11** ^{1}	**10th** ^{1}

^1 3 points scored using the A1.
