= Arrows A3 =

Formula One Car

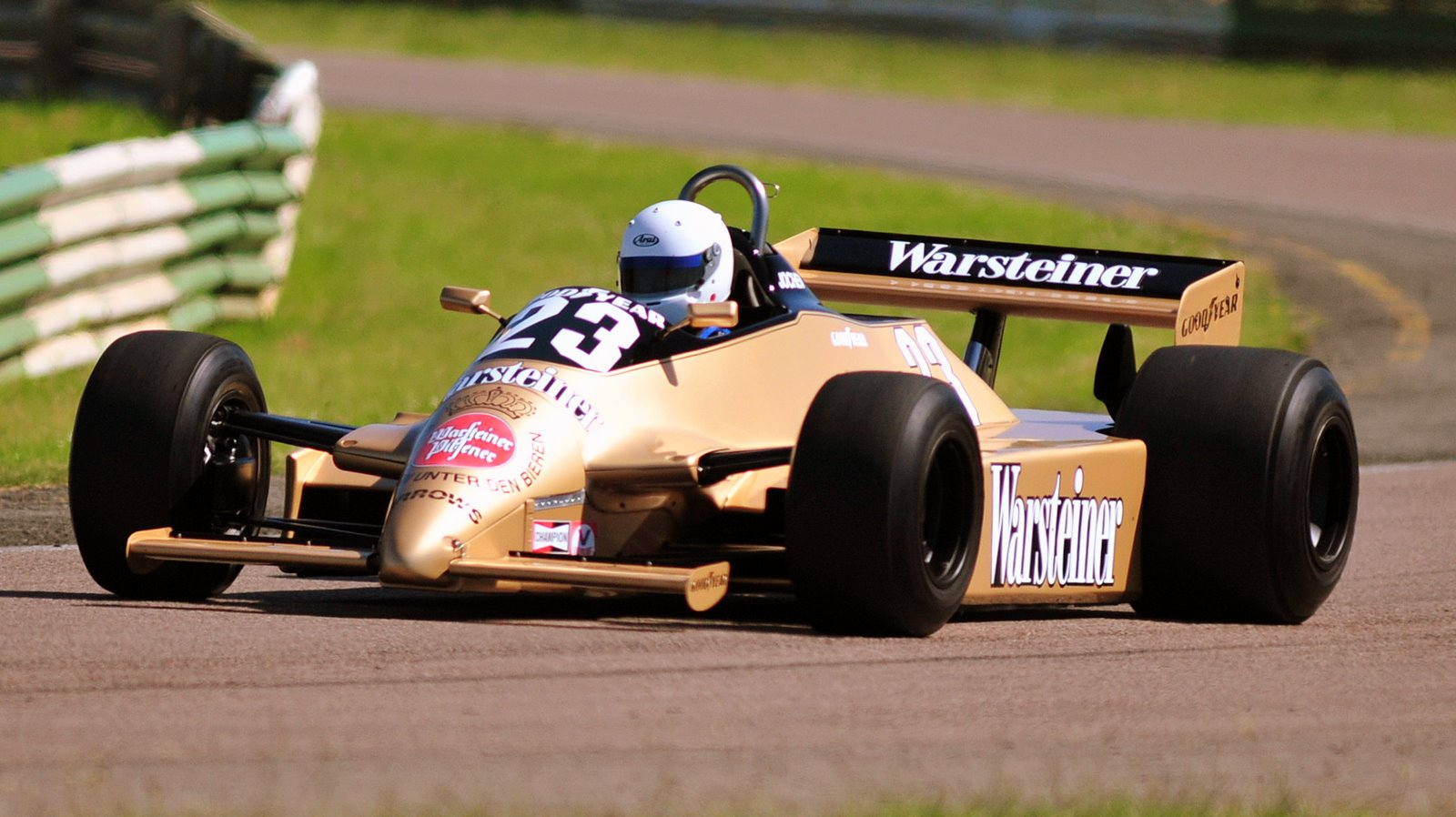
- The A3 at Mallory Park
- Category: Formula One
- Constructor: Arrows
- Designers: Tony Southgate (Technical Director); Dave Wass (Chief Designer)
- Predecessor: A2
- Successor: A4

Technical specifications
- Chassis: Aluminium monocoque
- Suspension (front): Double wishbones, springs
- Suspension (rear): Double wishbones, springs
- Axle track: Front: 1,727 mm (68.0 in); Rear: 1,600 mm (63 in)
- Wheelbase: 2,591 mm (102.0 in)
- Engine: Cosworth DFV, 2,993 cc (182.6 cu in), 90° V8, NA, mid-engine, longitudinally mounted
- Transmission: Hewland FGA 400 5/6-speed manual
- Fuel: Valvoline
- Tyres: Goodyear (1980); Michelin (1981); Pirelli (1981)

Competition history
- Notable entrants: Arrows Racing Team
- Notable drivers: (Italy) Riccardo Patrese (West Germany) Jochen Mass (New Zealand) Mike Thackwell (West Germany) Manfred Winkelhock
- Debut: 1980 Argentine Grand Prix
- Last event: 1981 Caesars Palace Grand Prix
Races	Wins	Podiums	Poles	F/Laps
29	0	3	1	0
- Constructors' Championships: 0
- Drivers' Championships: 0
- Unless otherwise stated, all data refer to Formula One World Championship Grands Prix only.

The Arrows A3 was a Formula One car which the Arrows team used to compete in the 1980 and 1981 Formula One seasons.

After the failure of the A2 in the 1979 Formula One season, the A3 was a very conventional design. The A3 featured a short wheelbase and conventional front nose and rear wing. The only aerodynamic novelty was a gearbox enclosure to reduce drag.

The car was used in 1981, as Arrows did not have the resources to create a car with hydropneumatic suspension like the Brabham BT49C.

== Complete Formula One World Championship results ==
(key) (results in bold indicate pole position)

Year	Entrant	Engine	Tyres	Drivers	1	2	3	4	5	6	7	8	9	10	11	12	13	14	15	Points	WCC
1980	Warsteiner Arrows Racing Team	Ford Cosworth DFV	**G**		ARG	BRA	RSA	USW	BEL	MON	FRA	GBR	GER	AUT	NED	ITA	CAN	USA		11	7th
1980	Warsteiner Arrows Racing Team	Ford Cosworth DFV	**G**	Riccardo Patrese	Ret	6	Ret	2	Ret	8	9	9	9	14	Ret	Ret	Ret	Ret		11	7th
1980	Warsteiner Arrows Racing Team	Ford Cosworth DFV	**G**	Jochen Mass	Ret	10	6	7	Ret	4	10	13	8	DNQ			11	Ret		11	7th
1980	Warsteiner Arrows Racing Team	Ford Cosworth DFV	**G**	Mike Thackwell											DNQ					11	7th
1980	Warsteiner Arrows Racing Team	Ford Cosworth DFV	**G**	Manfred Winkelhock												DNQ				11	7th
1981	Arrows Racing Team	Ford Cosworth DFV	**MI**; **P**		USW	BRA	ARG	SMR	BEL	MON	ESP	FRA	GBR	GER	AUT	NED	ITA	CAN	CPL	10	8th
1981	Arrows Racing Team	Ford Cosworth DFV	**MI**; **P**	Riccardo Patrese	**Ret**	3	7	2	Ret	Ret	Ret	14	10	Ret	Ret	Ret	Ret	Ret	11	10	8th
1981	Arrows Racing Team	Ford Cosworth DFV	**MI**; **P**	Siegfried Stohr	DNQ	Ret	9	DNQ	Ret	Ret	Ret	DNQ	Ret	12	Ret	7	DNQ			10	8th
1981	Arrows Racing Team	Ford Cosworth DFV	**MI**; **P**	Jacques Villeneuve														DNQ	DNQ	10	8th
