= 1979 German Grand Prix =

- Race 10 of 15 in the 1979 Formula One season

Race details
- Date: 29 July 1979
- Official name: XLI Großer Preis von Deutschland
- Location: Hockenheimring, West Germany
- Course: Permanent racing facility
- Course length: 6.790 km (4.219 miles)
- Distance: 45 laps, 305.505 km (189.81 miles)
- Weather: Dry

Pole position
Driver	(France) Jean-Pierre Jabouille	Renault
- Time: 1:48.48

Fastest lap
Driver	(Canada) Gilles Villeneuve	Ferrari
- Time: 1:51.89 on lap 40

Podium
First	(Australia) Alan Jones	Williams-Ford
Second	(Switzerland) Clay Regazzoni	Williams-Ford
Third	(France) Jacques Laffite	Ligier-Ford

The 1979 German Grand Prix was a Formula One motor race held on 29 July 1979 at the Hockenheimring. The race, contested over 45 laps, was the tenth race of the 1979 Formula One season and was won by Alan Jones, driving a Williams-Ford, with team-mate Clay Regazzoni second and Jacques Laffite third in a Ligier-Ford. This was the second consecutive win for the Williams team, following Regazzoni's triumph at Silverstone two weeks previously.

Jean-Pierre Jabouille had taken pole position in his Renault, but out-braked himself and spun off chasing Jones into the Sachskurve on the seventh lap. Jones had a leaky rear tire for the last twenty laps of the race, but Regazzoni received orders to stay behind. The one-two finish moved Williams into third place in the Constructors' Championship.

== Qualifying ==
Pos	No	Driver	Constructor	Car	Lap	Gap
1	15	(France) Jean-Pierre Jabouille	Renault	Renault RS10	1:48.48	
2	27	(Australia) Alan Jones	Williams-Ford	Williams FW07	1:48.75	+0.27
3	26	(France) Jacques Laffite	Ligier-Ford	Ligier JS11	1:49.43	+0.95
4	6	(Brazil) Nelson Piquet	Brabham-Alfa Romeo	Brabham BT48	1:49.50	+1.02
5	11	(South Africa) Jody Scheckter	Ferrari	Ferrari 312 T4	1:50.00	+1.52
6	28	(Switzerland) Clay Regazzoni	Williams-Ford	Williams FW07	1:50.12	+1.64
7	5	(Austria) Niki Lauda	Brabham-Alfa Romeo	Brabham BT48	1:50.37	+1.89
8	3	(France) Didier Pironi	Tyrrell-Ford	Tyrrell 009	1:50.40	+1.92
9	12	(Canada) Gilles Villeneuve	Ferrari	Ferrari 312 T4	1:50.41	+1.93
10	16	(France) René Arnoux	Renault	Renault RS10	1:50.48	+2.00
11	1	(United States) Mario Andretti	Lotus-Ford	Lotus 79	1:50.68	+2.20
12	7	(United Kingdom) John Watson	McLaren-Ford	McLaren M29	1:50.86	+2.38
13	2	(Argentina) Carlos Reutemann	Lotus-Ford	Lotus 79	1:50.94	+2.46
14	25	(Belgium) Jacky Ickx	Ligier-Ford	Ligier JS11	1:51.07	+2.59
15	8	(France) Patrick Tambay	McLaren-Ford	McLaren M29	1:51.47	+2.99
16	4	(United Kingdom) Geoff Lees	Tyrrell-Ford	Tyrrell 009	1:51.50	+3.02
17	20	(Finland) Keke Rosberg	Wolf-Ford	Wolf WR7	1:52.01	+3.53
18	30	(West Germany) Jochen Mass	Arrows-Ford	Arrows A2	1:52.74	+4.26
19	29	(Italy) Riccardo Patrese	Arrows-Ford	Arrows A2-1	1:52.93	+4.45
20	17	(Netherlands) Jan Lammers	Shadow-Ford	Shadow DN9B	1:53.59	+5.11
21	18	(Italy) Elio de Angelis	Shadow-Ford	Shadow DN9B	1:53.73	+5.25
22	14	(Brazil) Emerson Fittipaldi	Fittipaldi-Ford	Fittipaldi F6A	1:54.01	+5.53
23	9	(West Germany) Hans-Joachim Stuck	ATS-Ford	ATS D2	1:54.47	+5.99
24	31	(Mexico) Héctor Rebaque	Lotus-Ford	Lotus 79	1:55.86	+7.38
DNQ	22	(France) Patrick Gaillard	Ensign-Ford	Ensign N179	1:55.95	+7.47
DNQ	24	(Italy) Arturo Merzario	Merzario-Ford	Merzario A2	2:01.84	+13.36

== Classification ==
Pos	No	Driver	Constructor	Tyre	Laps	Time/Retired	Grid	Points
1	27	(Australia) Alan Jones	Williams-Ford	G	45	1:24:48.83	2	9
2	28	(Switzerland) Clay Regazzoni	Williams-Ford	G	45	+2.91	6	6
3	26	(France) Jacques Laffite	Ligier-Ford	G	45	+18.39	3	4
4	11	(South Africa) Jody Scheckter	Ferrari	M	45	+31.20	5	3
5	7	(United Kingdom) John Watson	McLaren-Ford	G	45	+1:37.80	12	2
6	30	(West Germany) Jochen Mass	Arrows-Ford	G	44	+1 Lap	18	1
7	4	(United Kingdom) Geoff Lees	Tyrrell-Ford	G	44	+1 Lap	16	
8	12	(Canada) Gilles Villeneuve	Ferrari	M	44	+1 Lap	9	
9	3	(France) Didier Pironi	Tyrrell-Ford	G	44	+1 Lap	8	
10	17	(Netherlands) Jan Lammers	Shadow-Ford	G	44	+1 Lap	20	
11	18	(Italy) Elio de Angelis	Shadow-Ford	G	43	+2 Laps	21	
12	6	(Brazil) Nelson Piquet	Brabham-Alfa Romeo	G	42	Engine	4	
Ret	29	(Italy) Riccardo Patrese	Arrows-Ford	G	34	Tyre	19	
Ret	8	(France) Patrick Tambay	McLaren-Ford	G	30	Suspension	15	
Ret	20	(Finland) Keke Rosberg	Wolf-Ford	G	29	Engine	17	
Ret	5	(Austria) Niki Lauda	Brabham-Alfa Romeo	G	27	Engine	7	
Ret	25	(Belgium) Jacky Ickx	Ligier-Ford	G	24	Tyre	14	
Ret	31	(Mexico) Héctor Rebaque	Lotus-Ford	G	22	Handling	24	
Ret	1	(United States) Mario Andretti	Lotus-Ford	G	16	Transmission	11	
Ret	16	(France) René Arnoux	Renault	M	9	Tyre	10	
Ret	15	(France) Jean-Pierre Jabouille	Renault	M	7	Spun Off	1	
Ret	14	(Brazil) Emerson Fittipaldi	Fittipaldi-Ford	G	4	Electrical	22	
Ret	2	(Argentina) Carlos Reutemann	Lotus-Ford	G	1	Accident	13	
Ret	9	(West Germany) Hans-Joachim Stuck	ATS-Ford	G	0	Suspension	23	
DNQ	22	(France) Patrick Gaillard	Ensign-Ford	G				
DNQ	24	(Italy) Arturo Merzario	Merzario-Ford	G				

== Notes ==
- This was the 25th Grand Prix start for Arrows.
- This was the 5th and 6th podium finish for Williams.

== Championship standings after the race ==
Drivers' Championship standings

	Pos	Driver	Points
	1	(South Africa) Jody Scheckter*	35 (39)
	2	(France) Jacques Laffite*	28
	3	(Canada) Gilles Villeneuve*	26
2	4	(Switzerland) Clay Regazzoni*	22
1	5	(France) Patrick Depailler*	20 (22)

Constructors' Championship standings

	Pos	Constructor	Points
	1	(Italy) Ferrari*	65
	2	(France) Ligier-Ford*	51
1	3	(United Kingdom) Williams-Ford*	38
1	4	(United Kingdom) Lotus-Ford*	37
	5	(United Kingdom) Tyrrell-Ford*	21

- Note: Only the top five positions are included for both sets of standings. Only the best 4 results from the first 7 races and the best 4 results from the last 8 races counted towards the Drivers' Championship. Numbers without parentheses are Championship points; numbers in parentheses are total points scored.
- Competitors marked with an asterisk still had a theoretical chance of becoming World Champion.

Previous race: 1979 British Grand Prix	FIA Formula One World Championship; 1979 season	Next race: 1979 Austrian Grand Prix
Previous race: 1978 German Grand Prix	German Grand Prix	Next race: 1980 German Grand Prix
