= Arrows Grand Prix International =

British Formula One team

Arrows
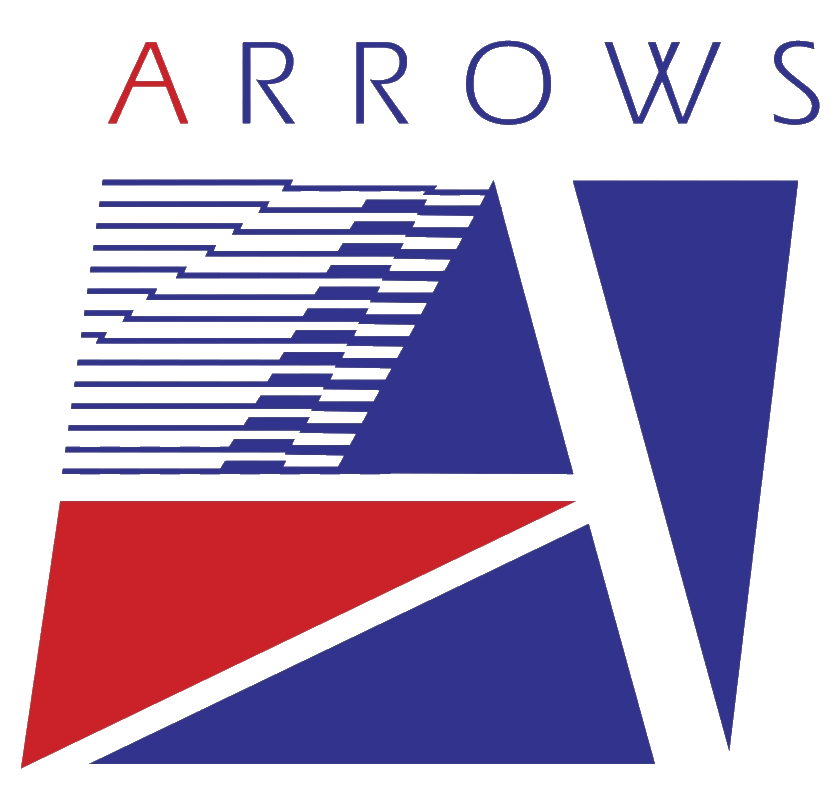
- Full name: Arrows Grand Prix International
- Base: Milton Keynes, United Kingdom (1977–1996); Leafield, United Kingdom (1997–2002)
- Founder(s): Franco Ambrosio; Alan Rees; Jackie Oliver; Dave Wass; Tony Southgate
- Noted staff: Tom Walkinshaw; Heini Mader; Justin Loosley; Ross Brawn
- Noted drivers: (Italy) Riccardo Patrese (West Germany) Rolf Stommelen (West Germany) Jochen Mass (Australia) Alan Jones (Belgium) Thierry Boutsen (Austria) Gerhard Berger (United Kingdom) Derek Warwick (United States) Eddie Cheever (United Kingdom) Damon Hill (Netherlands) Jos Verstappen (Brazil) Enrique Bernoldi

Formula One World Championship career
- First entry: 1978 Brazilian Grand Prix
- Races entered: 394 entries (382 starts)
- Constructors' Championships: 0
- Drivers' Championships: 0
- Race victories: 0 (Best finish: five 2nd places, last one at 1997 Hungarian Grand Prix)
- Podiums: 9
- Points: 164
- Pole positions: 1
- Fastest laps: 0
- Final entry: 2002 German Grand Prix

Arrows Grand Prix International was a British Formula One team active from 1978 to 2002. It was known as Footwork from 1991 to 1996.

== Origins ==
The Arrows Grand Prix International team was founded in Milton Keynes, England in November 1977, by Italian businessman Franco Ambrosio, Alan Rees, former racing driver Jackie Oliver, Dave Wass and Tony Southgate (the team deriving its name from the initials of their surnames) when they left the Shadow team. The team was formed and appeared on the grid for their first race at the 1978 Brazilian Grand Prix, all within three months.

Arrows signed Gunnar Nilsson and Riccardo Patrese to drive, but Nilsson was diagnosed with cancer shortly afterwards. His failing health caused Rolf Stommelen to take his place. The team initially ran a copy of the Shadow DN9, with the initials of the team's first sponsor, Franco Ambrosio, used in naming the car, the Arrows FA1. However, Ambrosio left the team in early 1978 when jailed in Italy for financial irregularities and main sponsor became Warsteiner. Shadow sued for copyright infringement, and the London High Courts ruled that the FA1 was a direct copy of the Shadow DN9. Arrows knew that they would lose the case and designed a brand new car, the Arrows A1, in 52 days. It was shown the day after the High Court of Justice in London upheld Shadow's claim and banned the team from racing the FA1.

== Arrows Grand Prix International ==
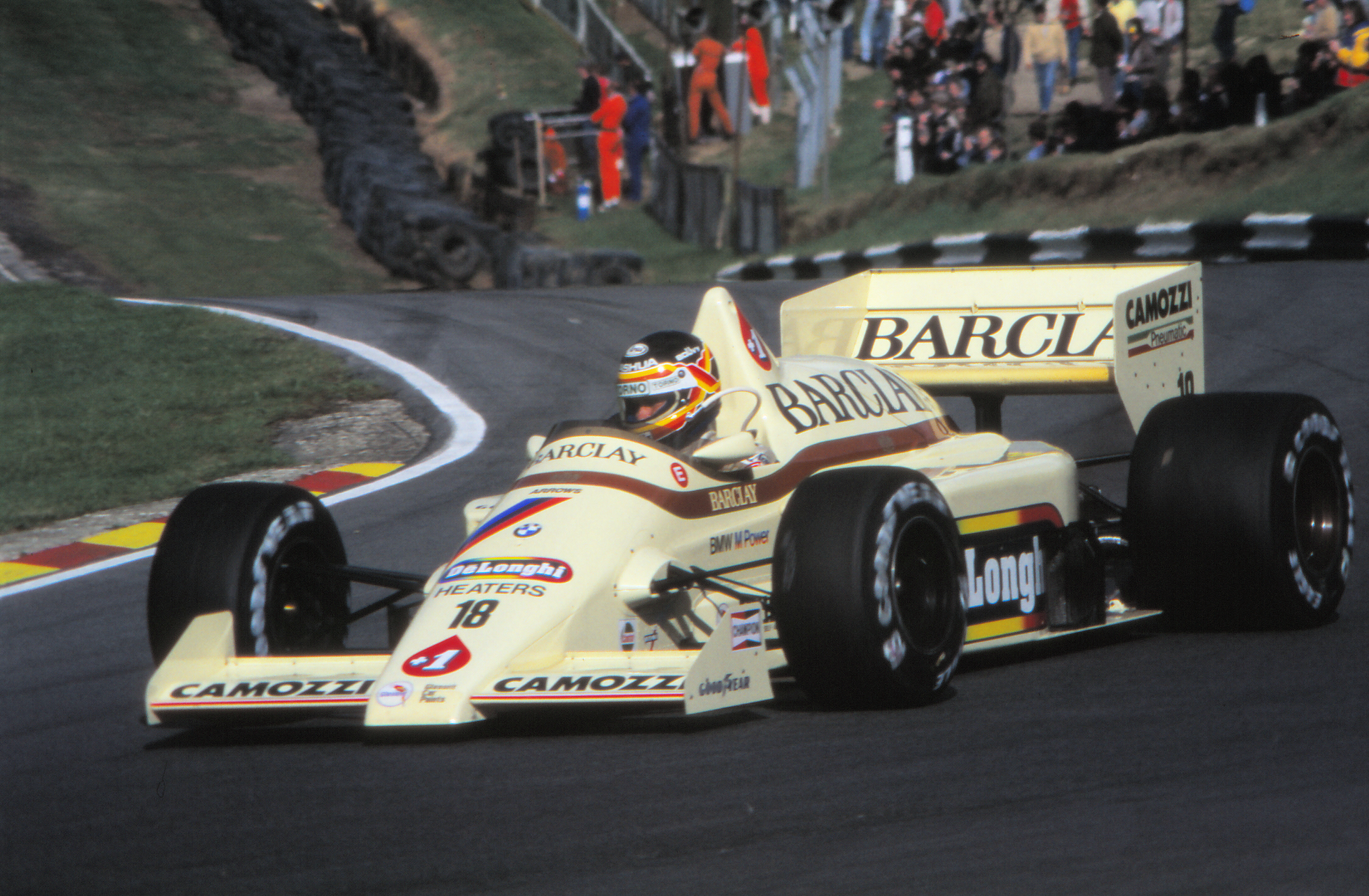
Thierry Boutsen during practice for the 1985 European Grand Prix

Patrese scored points in the team's third race, the US West Grand Prix at Long Beach. He was on course for victory in South Africa, but an engine failure in the closing stages of the race robbed him of the win. A second-place finish in Sweden behind Niki Lauda and the infamous fan car was a highlight for the Italian. In September 1978, in the Italian Grand Prix at Monza, Patrese was involved in an accident which eventually claimed the life of Ronnie Peterson. Patrese was accused of causing the accident and then subsequently banned from racing at the following event (the United States Grand Prix) by his fellow drivers. Patrese was later exonerated of all charges.

At the 1979 Monaco GP, Jochen Mass' Arrows A1 moved into third place during the race and looked to be closing in on the leaders. However, brake issues dropped him down to sixth position by the chequered flag. Lotus had introduced ground effect to F1 in 1978. As a result, Tony Southgate designed a radical ground effect car, the A2. While striking to look at, it was not competitive and Arrows was forced to use an upgraded version of the A1.

=== Moderate success in the 1980s ===
With the A2 being too radical, Southgate penned the Arrows A3 for 1980. The car was competitive, and it was used during the following season as well. In 1981, Patrese scored the team's only Formula One pole position in Long Beach, which he led until retiring with mechanical problems on lap 33 of 80. Arrows finished joint eighth in the Constructors' Championship that year.

At the Long Beach Grand Prix in 1983, 1980 World Drivers' Champion Alan Jones was tempted out of retirement on a one-off basis. He qualified 12th but dropped out with pain in the closing stages. A few weeks prior to the race Jones had fallen from a horse on his farm at home in Australia resulting in a broken hip. Jones also drove for the team at the 1983 Race of Champions at Brands Hatch (the last ever in-season, non-championship Formula One race), finishing 3rd and a week later was later entered in the French Grand Prix with a view to keeping the drive for the duration of the season, however expected sponsorship money never materialised and the teams regular driver Chico Serra returning to the seat.

In 1984 with BMW M12 turbo engines and sponsorship from cigarette brand Barclay things got much better. That year they were ninth in the Constructors' Championship and eighth in 1985. At the 1985 San Marino Grand Prix, Thierry Boutsen finished third behind Alain Prost and Elio de Angelis. However, after the race, Prost was disqualified because his car was 2 kg underweight, giving Boutsen the second place.

Tony Southgate had fallen out with the other founder members and left to work for Tom Walkinshaw, who would have a major impact on the team in later years. The 1986 season was a disaster. The A9 car was delivered late after British Aerospace had problems building the team's first carbon composite chassis. The car proved uncompetitive and its designer Dave Wass left to join Benetton, leaving just Oliver and Alan Rees in charge. Oliver wasted no time in replacing the two and hired Ross Brawn to design the effective A10 for 1987.

BMW pulled out of Formula One and the engines were badged Megatron through a deal with Arrows major sponsor USF&G, but the British team had their best seasons yet, finishing seventh in 1987 and fifth in 1988 (the final year for turbocharged engines) thanks to frequent points finishes by drivers Eddie Cheever and Derek Warwick. While 1987 and 1988 were Arrows' best years in F1, they were also the cause of frustration for the team and its drivers Warwick and Cheever. At the start of 1987 the sports ruling body (FIA) mandated that all turbo powered cars were to use a pop-off valve in order to restrict turbo boost. This was done not only to slow the cars down for safety reasons, but it was an effort to curb the rapidly rising costs of Formula One. The problem for Arrows was that the valve would regularly cut in lower than the set limit (4.0 bar in 1987, 2.5 bar in 1988). This meant that the Megatron engines were not producing their full power. It took the team's engine designer Heini Mader until just before the 1988 Italian Grand Prix at Monza (Round 12) to find the solution, which was simply moving the valve closer to the engine, something Honda and Ferrari engineers had long before discovered. Although Cheever and Warwick finished the race in third and fourth respectively, it was too little too late as the turbo era ended after the 1988 season.

Warwick and Cheever stayed with the team for 1989 and drove the Brawn designed Arrows A11, which was powered by the Ford DFR V8 engine. The team's best finish came at the United States Grand Prix in Cheever's home town of Phoenix. There, the American scored his final podium finish by finishing third. Ultimately, however, Cheever struggled in the A11 (which had to be specially modified early in the season so the tall American could fit in the car) and he actually failed to qualify at the British and Italian Grands Prix. Warwick's perennial bad luck also continued: a long pit stop during the opening race in Brazil cost him what many believed would have been his first win, while at Round 6 in the wet Canadian Grand Prix, Warwick briefly led, and was in second place when his Ford V8 blew. He had been regularly faster than those behind him (including eventual winner Thierry Boutsen, who drove a Williams-Renault), and could have won when race leader Ayrton Senna blew the Honda engine in his McLaren with only two laps remaining. After finishing fifth in 1988, Arrows dropped to seventh in 1989.

== Footwork Arrows ==
Japanese businessman Wataru Ohashi invested in Arrows in 1990 and the cars started displaying the Footwork logo prominently. Jackie Oliver sold his shares in the team to Ohashi, but remained as team principal. Alan Jenkins was hired as technical director after Brawn moved to TWR, but had a difficult relationship with Oliver. The team was officially renamed Footwork in 1991, and secured a deal to race with Porsche V12 engines, but the car was woefully uncompetitive. The engine was overweight and underpowered and Porsche quickly pulled the plug. Footwork quickly switched to a Ford V8.

In 1992 the team switched to Mugen engines while Jenkins continued to design simple but effective cars on a limited budget. The 1994 season was the most competitive showing, with several points finishes gained, including a double points finish in Germany. Christian Fittipaldi was partnered with Gianni Morbidelli after impressive performances in testing, while the FA15 featured some innovative aerodynamics. Alan D. Harrison (longest serving member having been with JO & AR since early Shadow F1) took over as Team Manager, after John Wickham. Morbidelli was Footwork's most successful driver, and scored a podium in Australia in 1995, the final race in the Footwork era. Morbidelli enjoyed the experience, stating they were his favourite years in racing but conceded that money was tight. Oliver had retained control throughout the entire period, funding the team from his own pocket after Ohashi withdrew his support and taking on pay drivers due to lack of sponsorship.

== TWR Arrows ==
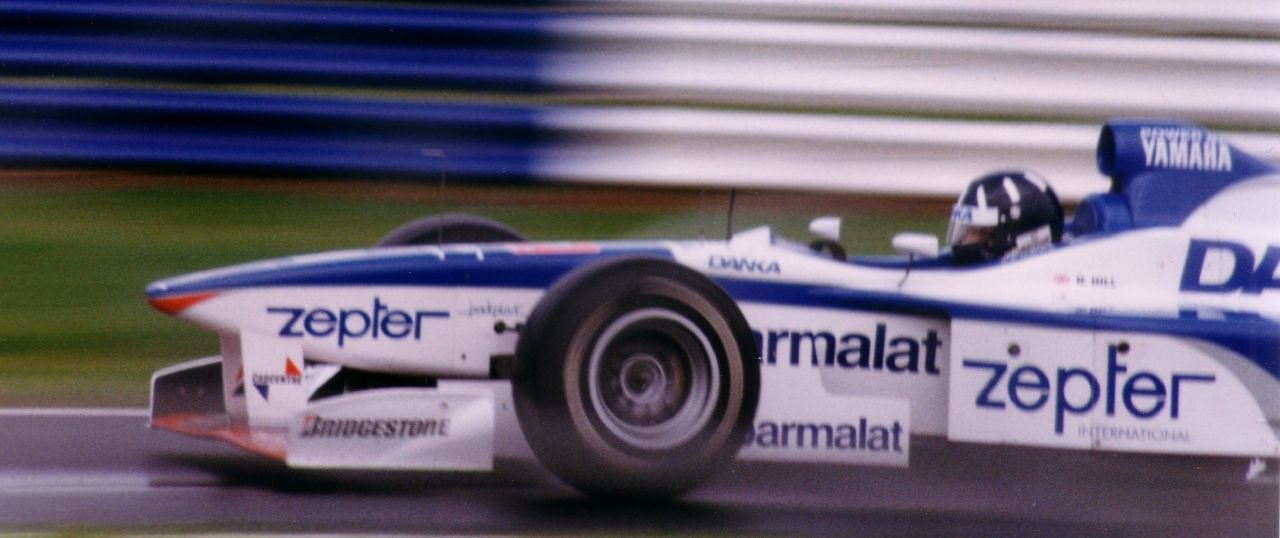
At the 1997 British GP, Hill scored his first point for the Arrows team.

After a failed attempt to buy Ligier, Tom Walkinshaw bought 51% of the team. In so doing he bought out Alan Rees' share in March 1996, and the team dropped the Footwork name (though the team was still listed as Footwork in the constructor standings that year). In taking over Arrows, he brought designer Frank Dernie and several others with him from Ligier and dropped Alan Jenkins, who joined the new Stewart outfit. Walkinshaw had a history of success in various motor sport categories, having won the World Sportscar Championship for Jaguar three times, several touring car championships and had been behind Michael Schumacher's first world title. At the time, TWR was running the Holden Racing Team in Australia with great success. At home, Walkinshaw was operating the Volvo team in the British Touring Car Championship, and the Volvo and Arrows programmes were operated concurrently.

Walkinshaw had plans to turn Arrows into a world championship winning team. To that end in September he signed up World Champion Damon Hill and hired wealthy Brazilian Pedro Diniz to help pay for Hill's salary. His TWR operation moved the outfit to Leafield and put a new technical team in place. John Judd prepared the Yamaha sourced engine, while Dernie made way for John Barnard who was hired as designer and technical chief. Under an exclusive deal, Bridgestone supplied tyres. The team nearly secured a maiden victory at the 1997 Hungarian Grand Prix, where Hill started in third position and passed Michael Schumacher to take first place. Hill led comfortably until with just two laps left, a rubber seal in the hydraulic system failed. Hill was overtaken on the last lap but he clung on to finish second.

As Hill left Arrows after 1997 season to race for Jordan, the team contracted Finnish driver Mika Salo to partner Diniz for the 1998 F1 season. The 1998 season marked a new era for Arrows, as the team decided to build its own engines after buying out Brian Hart's preparation company. A V10 Arrows T2-F1 was made to power the cars for the team. It proved to be a difficult season, although both cars finished a respectable fourth and sixth at the eventful 1998 Monaco GP, and Diniz went on to score a single fifth-place finish at the wet Belgian race. Arrows ended up finishing seventh in the Constructors' Championship, with a total of six points. Barnard left the team after a dispute with Walkinshaw, with Mike Coughlan taking over as technical director. At this point Zakspeed tried to buy Walkinshaw's shares in Arrows for around $40 million but terms could not be reached and the deal fell through.

At the start of the 1999 Formula One season Malik Ado-Ibrahim bought a 25% shareholding in the team, and his T-Minus brand appeared on the cars for most of the year. However, he too could not provide sufficient funding. The idea behind the T-Minus brand was that companies and corporations would purchase the rights to use the name and they would be permitted to use the brand to promote their products. Malik stated that he had intentions to use the brand in conjunction with Lamborghini but a deal never pulled through. An Arrows employee at the time stated 'The T-Minus brand has brought in absolutely no money over the year' and that 'It was simply a dream in the Prince's head and nothing materialised.' The year was a tough one. Money was tight and the car was a mild update of the 1998 model. A solitary point was scored all season. During 1999, Jackie Oliver sold his remaining shares, leaving Walkinshaw in complete control. A deal with equity company Morgan Grenfell who bought into Arrows kept the team afloat, but would have long term implications for TWR. The driver lineup also changed when the team brought in rookie Pedro de la Rosa and 1998 Tyrrell driver Toranosuke Takagi, who both brought much needed funds.

In the 2000 season, Jos Verstappen returned to Arrows with teammate Pedro de la Rosa, where he had driven in 1996 and his teammate then was Ricardo Rosset. The chassis was an Arrows A21 with a Supertec (rebadged Renault) engine, the in-house built units proving unsuccessful. The Supertec engine was not the most powerful, but was still very good, and had been developed further for the season. Allied to an excellent aerodynamic package and good rear end stability, it allowed the Arrows A21 to set the best straight line speeds consistently around the circuits. An influx of sponsorship from Orange helped to fund the team. Generally, both Verstappen and de la Rosa were competitive within a close midfield. During the 2000 season, the Arrows team took part in a thirteen-part TV series named Racing Arrows, which followed the team and drivers throughout the year. It was shown on British TV channel ITV in 2001 during late-night slots.

Supertec was bought out by Renault at the end of 2000, which could have caused the team to take on expensive customer engines for 2001. As a result, a switch to Asiatech (rebadged Peugeot) V10s in 2001 and the loss of a lot of staff including team manager Steve Nielsen and designer Eghbal Hamidy left the team significantly weaker in 2001 when Tom Walkinshaw decided to replace de la Rosa with F1 debutant Enrique Bernoldi. The team struggled through the season and Verstappen scored the team's only point in Austria.

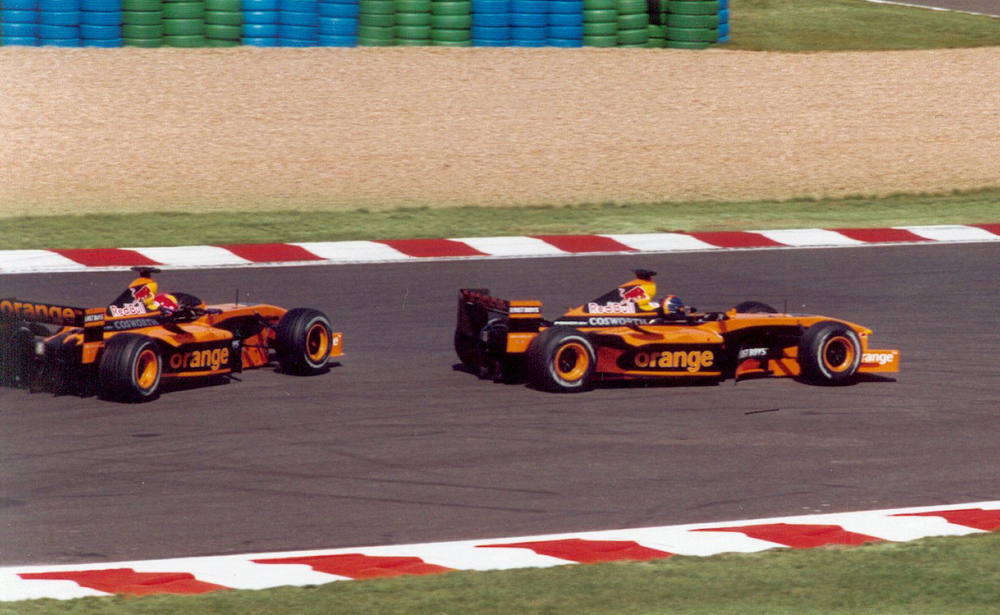
Heinz-Harald Frentzen and Enrique Bernoldi deliberately failed to qualify as per the instructions of the Arrows Grand Prix team at the 2002 French Grand Prix as the team's financial problems worsened.

For 2002, Walkinshaw made a deal to use customer Jaguar-spec Cosworth V10 engines in order to help Jaguar become a competitive team and retained Bernoldi (with support from Red Bull) but dropped Verstappen in favour of Heinz-Harald Frentzen, who became available when Prost Grand Prix closed down. This caused Verstappen successfully to sue for breach of contract. That year also saw a costly payout to Pedro Diniz after unsuccessfully suing the Brazilian, who had taken his funding to Sauber for 1999. The team faced a third litigation from Frentzen, who was contracted on a race-by-race basis and who had not yet been paid. Mounting debts including money owed to Cosworth spelled the end. Allied to sponsorship problems, Arrows ran out of money in the mid-season and did not appear at all the races at the end of the year, their drivers deliberately failing to qualify for the French Grand Prix.

Negotiations were undertaken throughout the season with potential investors to buy into the team or buy it outright, such as Craig Pollock, who had just been ousted from BAR and twice made an offer for the team, and Dietrich Mateschitz.

The team went into liquidation at the end of the season, also forcing TWR to close. The FIA rejected Arrows' entry application for the 2003 season prior to start date in Australia.

In their chequered history, Arrows set the unenviable record of 382 races without a win, although they collected nine podium finishes (one under Footwork) including five second places.

== Final chapter of Arrows Grand Prix International ==
All the Arrows A23 chassis and the full Arrows Grand Prix International intellectual property rights were bought by the Minardi team, including the initial concept and drawings of the Arrows A24. The Arrows A23 was renamed the Minardi PS04 and in back-to-back tests it was found superior to Minardi's PS03. Minardi however decided that they could not run a "pure-Arrows" and hence use the Arrows intellectual property to take the best from the PS03, PS04 / Arrows A23 and Arrows A24 design concepts to develop the Minardi PS04B for the 2004 season. For the following season the PS04B was developed into the PS05.

In 2005 the Arrows Grand Prix International bloodline continued through into Super Aguri when Paul Stoddart sold the combined Minardi and Arrows Grand Prix International intellectual property rights, as well as the Minardi PS05 cars to Red Bull and Aguri Suzuki respectively.

At the end of 2005, the newly formed Super Aguri F1 team took over the former Arrows base at Leafield in Oxfordshire and bought four unmodified Arrows A23s from Minardi, all of the spare parts, as well as the Arrows Grand Prix International intellectual property rights. Many of the ex-Arrows staff were hired to engineer the team, including technical director Mark Preston. The 2002 Arrows A23s were run (with minor modifications) as the Super Aguri SA05 during the first races of the 2006 season. An update of the 2002 Arrows chassis was designated the SA06 and made its debut at the 2006 German Grand Prix.

In late 2008 when Super Aguri folded, Formtech Composites purchased the intellectual property rights held by Super Aguri and took over the former Arrows base at Leafield. Today, Formtech Composites engineer composite components for the automotive, motorsport, military and aerospace industries.

== Racing record ==
Year	Name	Car	Engine	Tyres	No.	Drivers	Points	WCC
Arrows
1978	(United Kingdom) Arrows Racing Team (United Kingdom) Warsteiner Arrows Racing Team	FA1; A1	Ford-Cosworth DFV 3.0 V8	G	35	(Italy) Riccardo Patrese	11	9th
1978	(United Kingdom) Arrows Racing Team (United Kingdom) Warsteiner Arrows Racing Team	FA1; A1	Ford-Cosworth DFV 3.0 V8	G	36	(Italy) Riccardo Patrese	11	9th
1978	(United Kingdom) Arrows Racing Team (United Kingdom) Warsteiner Arrows Racing Team	FA1; A1	Ford-Cosworth DFV 3.0 V8	G	36	(Germany) Rolf Stommelen	11	9th
1979	(United Kingdom) Warsteiner Arrows Racing Team	A1; A2	Ford-Cosworth DFV 3.0 V8	G	29	(Italy) Riccardo Patrese	5	9th
1979	(United Kingdom) Warsteiner Arrows Racing Team	A1; A2	Ford-Cosworth DFV 3.0 V8	G	30	(Germany) Jochen Mass	5	9th
1980	(United Kingdom) Warsteiner Arrows Racing Team (United Kingdom) Warsteiner Arrows Racing with Penthouse Rizla+.	A3	Ford-Cosworth DFV 3.0 V8	G	29	(Italy) Riccardo Patrese	11	7th
1980	(United Kingdom) Warsteiner Arrows Racing Team (United Kingdom) Warsteiner Arrows Racing with Penthouse Rizla+.	A3	Ford-Cosworth DFV 3.0 V8	G	30	(Germany) Jochen Mass	11	7th
1980	(United Kingdom) Warsteiner Arrows Racing Team (United Kingdom) Warsteiner Arrows Racing with Penthouse Rizla+.	A3	Ford-Cosworth DFV 3.0 V8	G	30	(New Zealand) Mike Thackwell	11	7th
1980	(United Kingdom) Warsteiner Arrows Racing Team (United Kingdom) Warsteiner Arrows Racing with Penthouse Rizla+.	A3	Ford-Cosworth DFV 3.0 V8	G	30	(Germany) Manfred Winkelhock	11	7th
1981	(United Kingdom) Ragno Arrows Beta Racing Team	A3	Ford-Cosworth DFV 3.0 V8	M P	29	(Italy) Riccardo Patrese	10	8th
1981	(United Kingdom) Ragno Arrows Beta Racing Team	A3	Ford-Cosworth DFV 3.0 V8	M P	30	(Italy) Siegfried Stohr (Canada) Jacques Villeneuve Sr.	10	8th
1982	(United Kingdom) Ragno Arrows	A4; A5	Ford-Cosworth DFV 3.0 V8	P	29	(United Kingdom) Brian Henton (Switzerland) Marc Surer	5	10th
1982	(United Kingdom) Ragno Arrows	A4; A5	Ford-Cosworth DFV 3.0 V8	P	30	(Italy) Mauro Baldi	5	10th
1983	(United Kingdom) Arrows Racing Team	A6	Ford-Cosworth DFV 3.0 V8	G	29	(Switzerland) Marc Surer	4	10th
1983	(United Kingdom) Arrows Racing Team	A6	Ford-Cosworth DFV 3.0 V8	G	30	(Brazil) Chico Serra (Australia) Alan Jones (Belgium) Thierry Boutsen	4	10th
1984	(United Kingdom) Barclay Nordica Arrows	A6	Ford-Cosworth DFV 3.0 V8	G	17	(Belgium) Thierry Boutsen	3	10th
1984	(United Kingdom) Barclay Nordica Arrows	A6	Ford-Cosworth DFV 3.0 V8	G	18	(Switzerland) Marc Surer	3	10th
1984	(United Kingdom) Barclay Nordica Arrows	A7	BMW M12/13 1.5 L4t	G	17	(Belgium) Thierry Boutsen	3	11th
1984	(United Kingdom) Barclay Nordica Arrows	A7	BMW M12/13 1.5 L4t	G	18	(Switzerland) Marc Surer	3	11th
1985	(United Kingdom) Barclay Arrows BMW	A8	BMW M12/13 1.5 L4t	G	17; 18	(Austria) Gerhard Berger (Belgium) Thierry Boutsen	14	8th
1986	(United Kingdom) Barclay Arrows BMW	A8; A9	BMW M12/13 1.5 L4t	G	17 18	(Switzerland) Marc Surer (Germany) Christian Danner (Belgium) Thierry Boutsen	1	10th
1987	(United Kingdom) USF&G Arrows Megatron	A10	Megatron M12/13 1.5 L4t	G	17; 18	(United Kingdom) Derek Warwick (United States) Eddie Cheever	11	7th
1988	(United Kingdom) USF&G Arrows Megatron	A10B	Megatron M12/13 1.5 L4t	G	17 18	(United Kingdom) Derek Warwick (United States) Eddie Cheever	23	5th
1989	(United Kingdom) USF&G Arrows Ford	A11	Ford-Cosworth DFR 3.5 V8	G	9 10	(United Kingdom) Derek Warwick (United Kingdom) Martin Donnelly (United States) Eddie Cheever	13	7th
1990	(United Kingdom) Footwork Arrows Racing	A11; A11B	Ford-Cosworth DFR 3.5 V8	G	9; 10	(Italy) Michele Alboreto (Germany) Bernd Schneider (Italy) Alex Caffi	2	9th
Footwork
1991	(United Kingdom) Footwork Porsche (United Kingdom) Footwork Ford	A11C; FA12; FA12C	Porsche 3512 3.5 V12; Ford-Cosworth DFR 3.5 V8	G	9; 10	(Italy) Michele Alboreto (Italy) Alex Caffi (Sweden) Stefan Johansson	0; 0	NC; NC
1992	(United Kingdom) Footwork Mugen Honda	FA13	Mugen-Honda MF-351H 3.5 V10	G	9; 10	(Italy) Michele Alboreto (Japan) Aguri Suzuki	6	7th
1993	(United Kingdom) Footwork Mugen Honda	FA13B; FA14	Mugen-Honda MF-351HB 3.5 V10	G	9; 10	(United Kingdom) Derek Warwick (Japan) Aguri Suzuki	4	9th
1994	(United Kingdom) Footwork Ford	FA15	Ford HBE7/8 3.5 V8	G	9; 10	(Brazil) Christian Fittipaldi (Italy) Gianni Morbidelli	9	9th
1995	(United Kingdom) Footwork Hart	FA16	Hart 830 3.0 V8	G	9; 10	(Italy) Gianni Morbidelli (Italy) Max Papis (Japan) Taki Inoue	5	8th
1996	(United Kingdom) Footwork Hart	FA17	Hart 830 3.0 V8	G	16; 17	(Brazil) Ricardo Rosset (Netherlands) Jos Verstappen	1	9th
TWR Arrows
1997	(United Kingdom) Danka Arrows Yamaha	A18	Yamaha OX11A 3.0 V10	B	1; 2	(United Kingdom) Damon Hill (Brazil) Pedro Diniz	9	8th
1998	(United Kingdom) Danka Zepter Arrows	A19	Arrows T2-F1 3.0 V10	B	16; 17	(Brazil) Pedro Diniz (Finland) Mika Salo	6	7th
1999	(United Kingdom) Repsol Arrows	A20	Arrows A20E 3.0 V10	B	14; 15	(Spain) Pedro de la Rosa (Japan) Toranosuke Takagi	1	9th
2000	(United Kingdom) Arrows F1 Team	A21	Supertec FB02 3.0 V10	B	18; 19	(Spain) Pedro de la Rosa (Netherlands) Jos Verstappen	7	7th
2001	(United Kingdom) Orange Arrows Asiatech	A22	Asiatech 001 3.0 V10	B	14; 15	(Netherlands) Jos Verstappen (Brazil) Enrique Bernoldi	1	10th
2002	(United Kingdom) Orange Arrows	A23	Cosworth CR-3 3.0 V10	B	20; 21	(Germany) Heinz-Harald Frentzen (Brazil) Enrique Bernoldi	2	11th
