= McLaren M28 =

Formula One racing car

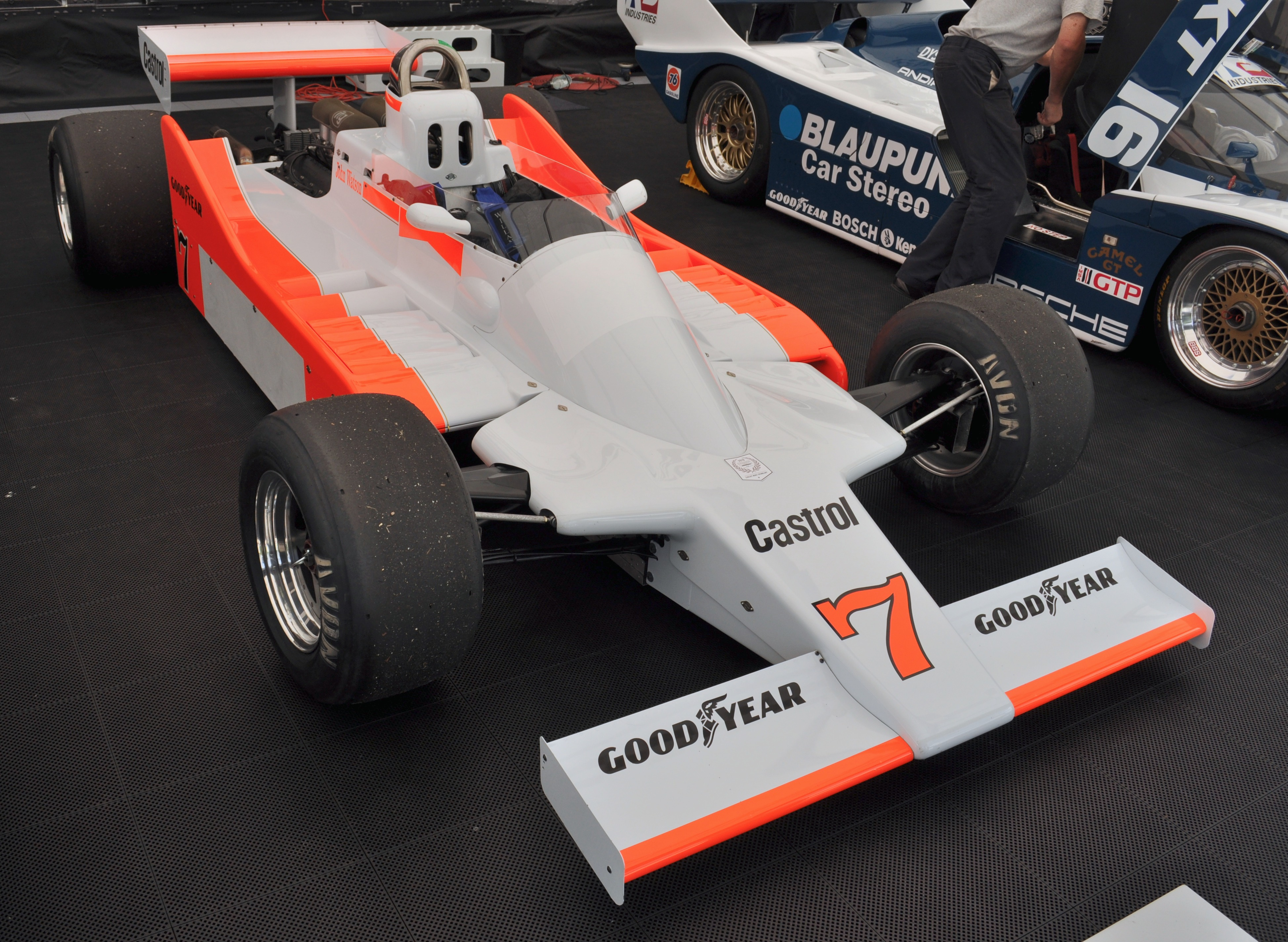
- Category: Formula One
- Constructor: McLaren
- Designers: Gordon Coppuck; Steve Harvey (Design Engineer); Dave Quill (Design Engineer); Ray Stokoe (Design Engineer)
- Predecessor: McLaren M26
- Successor: McLaren M29

Technical specifications
- Chassis: Aluminium monocoque
- Engine: Ford-Cosworth DFV, 2993cc V8, naturally aspirated, mid-engined, longitudinally mounted
- Transmission: McLaren / Hewland FGA 400/6 6-speed manual
- Fuel: Castrol
- Tyres: Goodyear

Competition history
- Notable entrants: Marlboro Team McLaren
- Notable drivers: 7. (United Kingdom) John Watson; 8. (France) Patrick Tambay
- Debut: 1979 Argentine Grand Prix
Races	Wins	Poles	F/Laps
9	0	0	0

The McLaren M28 is a Formula One racing car built and run by McLaren in the 1979 Formula One World Championship. Powered by a naturally-aspirated Ford Cosworth 3-litre engine, the M28 was designed and wind tunnel tested during the latter half of 1978.

== Development ==
Following a disastrous 1978 season, James Hunt left for Walter Wolf Racing and was supposed to be replaced by Ronnie Peterson but he was killed at the 1978 Italian Grand Prix. McLaren was left with few drivers available on the market and John Watson was signed for 1979. The car was noticeably larger than contemporary designs and was much bulkier looking. Three chassis were built. The bulky design had a sharp impact on top speed, and the car was one of the slowest through speed traps. The car first appeared on track in October 1978 during a test at Watkins Glen.

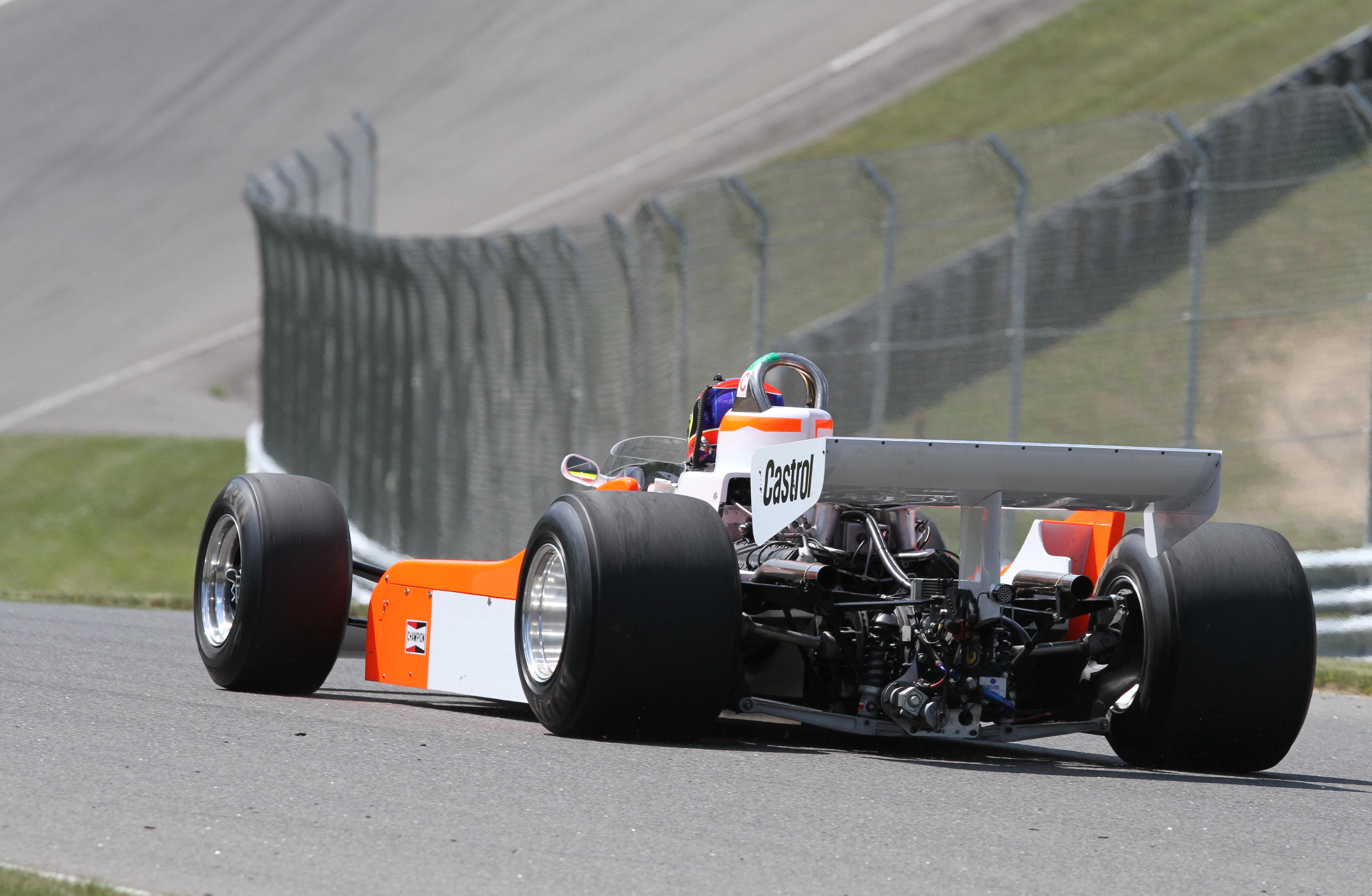
M28 rear view on track

During initial testing, the M28 was soon found to have problems with poor grip as its ground effect design proved not particularly effective. Watson described the car as "a disaster." Patrick Tambay was even less enthused by the M28, labelling it "a shitbox." The car suffered from a lack of torsional rigidity and a poor understanding of the ground effect aerodynamics required to be competitive against the new generation of F1 cars.

Watson described how after the first round of tests had been done, the chassis was drooping and had lost all tensile strength. The team, unused to working with advanced aerodynamics tried conventional adjustments to compensate, to no avail. He later stated that the M28 was the worst F1 car that he ever drove.

Coppuck had designed the car to have a very narrow monocoque constructed of aluminium and nomex honeycomb to give the car a stiff chassis with as large an underfloor area as possible for the ground effect to work, but the upshot was that the car had a large frontal area which caused drag. McLaren boss Teddy Mayer was shocked at the car's lack of performance, stating that Coppuck had dropped the ball.

The M28 was completely redesigned, and the B spec car was introduced in Belgium, but there was no improvement in performance. Efforts to resolve the car's problems had made the M28 overweight and slow. However, it was still the preferred chassis over its predecessor, the McLaren M26, and was used during the first half of the 1979 season until a better design could be introduced. As their rivals introduced better cars through the season McLaren rapidly slipped out of the running for the championship. However, it was driven to third in the opening race of the season, the 1979 Argentine Grand Prix, by Watson, who also took sixth in Belgium and fourth at Monaco. Its second driver was Patrick Tambay.

In addition to the McLaren team's customary red and white Marlboro sponsorship livery, the M28 also raced in the colours of German beer company Löwenbräu at the 1979 United States Grand Prix West.

== Complete Formula One World Championship results ==
(key) (results in bold indicate pole position) (results in italics indicate fastest lap)

Year	Entrant	Engine	Tyres	Drivers	1	2	3	4	5	6	7	8	9	10	11	12	13	14	15	Points	WCC
1979	Marlboro Team McLaren	Ford Cosworth DFV	**G**		ARG	BRA	RSA	USW	ESP	BEL	MON	FRA	GBR	GER	AUT	NED	ITA	CAN	USA	15*	7th
1979	Marlboro Team McLaren	Ford Cosworth DFV	**G**	John Watson	3	8	Ret	Ret	Ret	6	4	11								15*	7th
1979	Marlboro Team McLaren	Ford Cosworth DFV	**G**	Patrick Tambay	Ret		10	Ret	13		DNQ	10	7							15*	7th

* 7 points scored using the McLaren M29.
