= Williams FW06 =

Formula One motor racing car

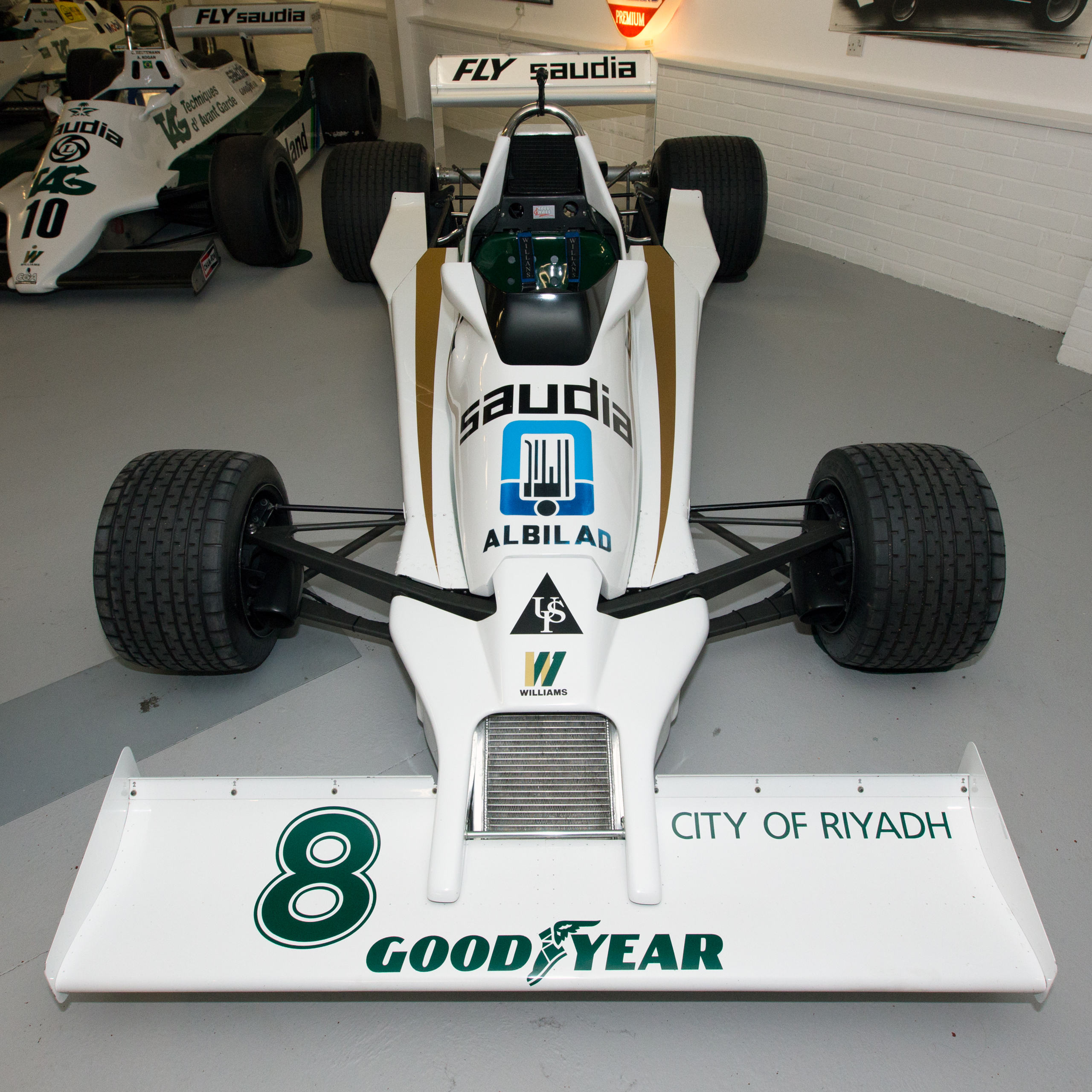
- Category: Formula One
- Constructor: Williams
- Designer: Patrick Head
- Predecessor: Williams FW04
- Successor: Williams FW07

Technical specifications
- Chassis: Aluminium monocoque
- Engine: Ford-Cosworth DFV 2,993 cc (182.6 cu in) 90° V8 naturally aspirated mid-mounted
- Transmission: Hewland FGA 400 6-speed manual
- Tyres: Goodyear

Competition history
- Notable entrants: Williams Grand Prix Engineering; Albilad-Saudia Racing Team (1979)
- Notable drivers: 27. (Australia) Alan Jones; 28. (Switzerland) Clay Regazzoni
- Debut: 1978 Argentine Grand Prix
Races	Wins	Poles	F/Laps
20	0	0	2

The Williams FW06 was the first car produced by the combination of Frank Williams and Patrick Head for their Williams Grand Prix Engineering Formula One team. As was the standard arrangement for the many small British garagiste teams, the car was powered by the Cosworth DFV 3.0 litre V8 engine.

== Concept ==
After a season running a customer March chassis in 1977 with limited results, just as in 1975 Frank Williams decided on a completely independent car for the new season. The FW06 was Patrick Head's first full F1 design. Inspired by the shortcomings of the March and his quick fix improvements done to the FW04 he took no chances and penned a simple and light car that handled well. It had a conventional design but was as tightly packaged as possible. As was normal at the time, some parts for the car were not bespoke items, but bought off the shelf. For example the radiators were sourced from a Volkswagen Golf. However reliability was an issue to begin with.

== Race history ==
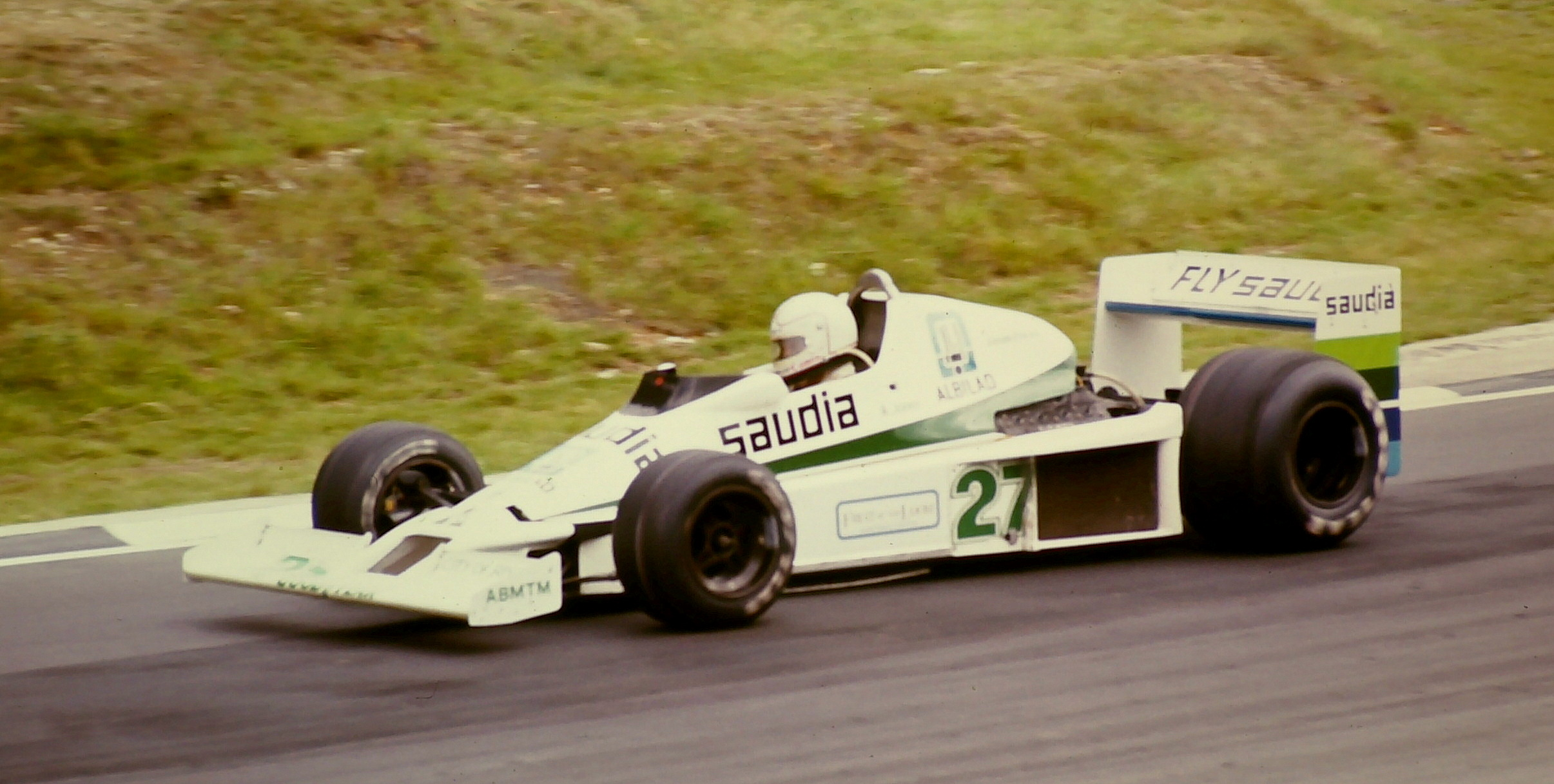
Alan Jones driving the FW06 at the 1978 British Grand Prix

With major sponsorship secured from Saudi Arabian Airlines and TAG, the FW06 first took to the racetrack in the 1978 Argentine Grand Prix in the hands of Alan Jones, and a single car competed in all 16 rounds of the World Championship that season, finishing in the points 3 times including a second place at Watkins Glen, equalling Williams best result at the 1975 German Grand Prix. An excellent drive by Jones at Long Beach was unrewarded. While running second the car developed mechanical trouble and fell back. Jones liked the car, stating that it was pleasant to drive and was very drivable compared to previous machinery he had been given, and felt it was one of the best non ground effect cars that season. The higher budget afforded by the sponsorship deal allowed Patrick Head to continually develop the FW06 throughout the year. Williams finished ninth in the constructors' championship in 1978, matching the best performance by the team in its first incarnation achieved in 1975.

The FW06 also saw service in the first four races of the 1979 season, with Clay Regazzoni joining Jones in the team. Jones finished in third place at Long Beach, but by now the car was being left behind by the ground effect cars of Lotus, Ligier, Tyrrell and others, and the car was replaced by the FW07.

Upon being retired, the FW06 chassis was bought by motorcycle ace Giacomo Agostini, who had decided on a switch to car racing and drove the car with sponsorship from Marlboro in the British Formula One Championship in 1979 and 1980.

== In popular culture ==
The car appeared in the video game Formula One Championship Edition in the classic cars along with other cars including the Lotus 49C, Lotus 72D, Cooper T51, Alfa Romeo 158 and Renault RS01.

== Complete Formula One World Championship results ==
(key) (results in bold indicate pole position) (results in italics indicate fastest lap)

Year	Entrant	Engine	Tyres	Drivers	1	2	3	4	5	6	7	8	9	10	11	12	13	14	15	16	Points	WCC
1978	Williams Grand Prix Engineering	Ford Cosworth DFV V8	**G**		ARG	BRA	RSA	USW	MON	BEL	ESP	SWE	FRA	GBR	GER	AUT	NED	ITA	USA	CAN	11	9th
1978	Williams Grand Prix Engineering	Ford Cosworth DFV V8	**G**	Alan Jones	Ret	14	4	7	Ret	10	8	Ret	5	Ret	Ret	Ret	Ret	13	2	9	11	9th
1979	Albilad-Saudia Racing Team	Ford Cosworth DFV V8	**G**		ARG	BRA	RSA	USW	ESP	BEL	MON	FRA	GBR	GER	AUT	NED	ITA	CAN	USA		**75**^{1}	**2nd**
1979	Albilad-Saudia Racing Team	Ford Cosworth DFV V8	**G**	Alan Jones	9	Ret	Ret	3													**75**^{1}	**2nd**
1979	Albilad-Saudia Racing Team	Ford Cosworth DFV V8	**G**	Clay Regazzoni	10	15	9	Ret													**75**^{1}	**2nd**

^1 71 points in scored using the Williams FW07.
