= 1979 Formula One season =

33rd season of FIA Formula One motor racing

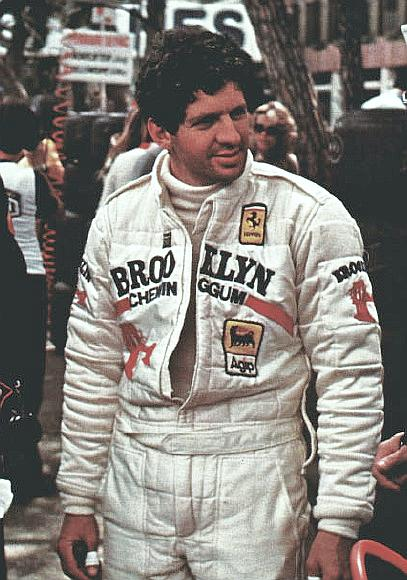
Jody Scheckter won the Drivers' Championship, driving for Ferrari.

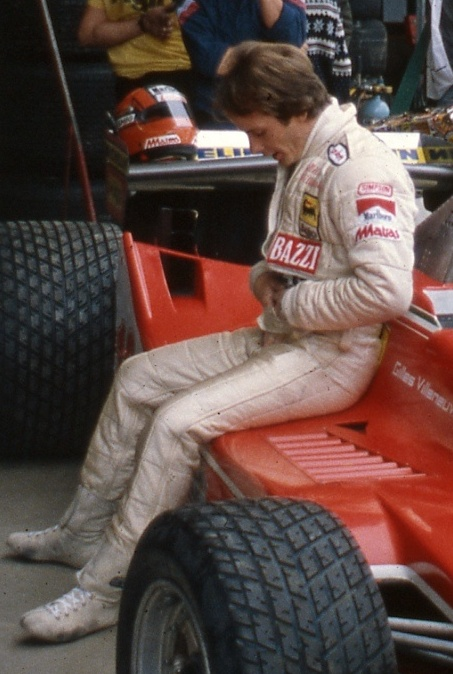
Gilles Villeneuve finished runner-up in the Drivers' Championship, 4 points behind Ferrari teammate Scheckter.

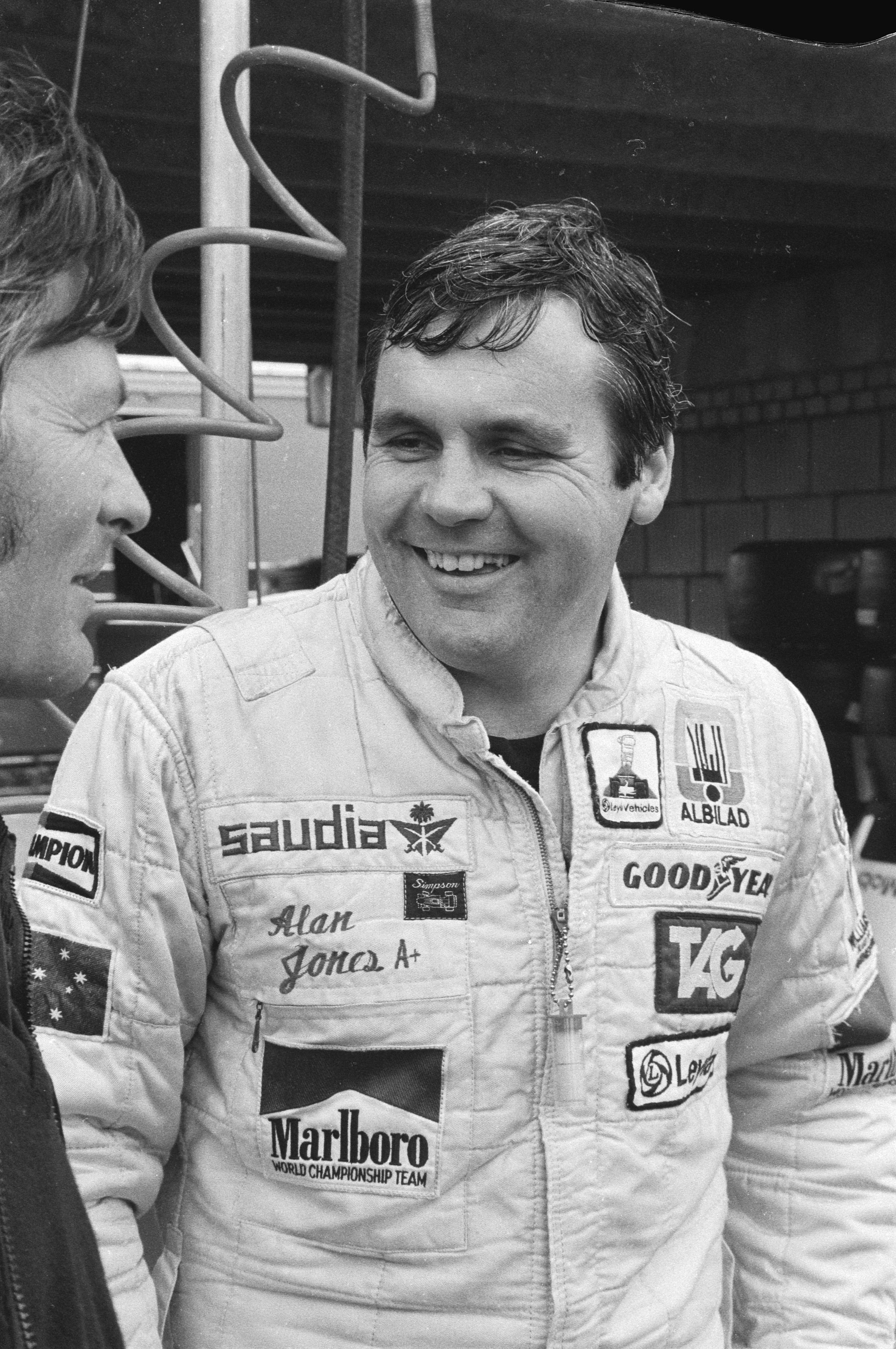
Alan Jones (pictured in 1980) finished third in the Drivers' Championship, driving for Williams.

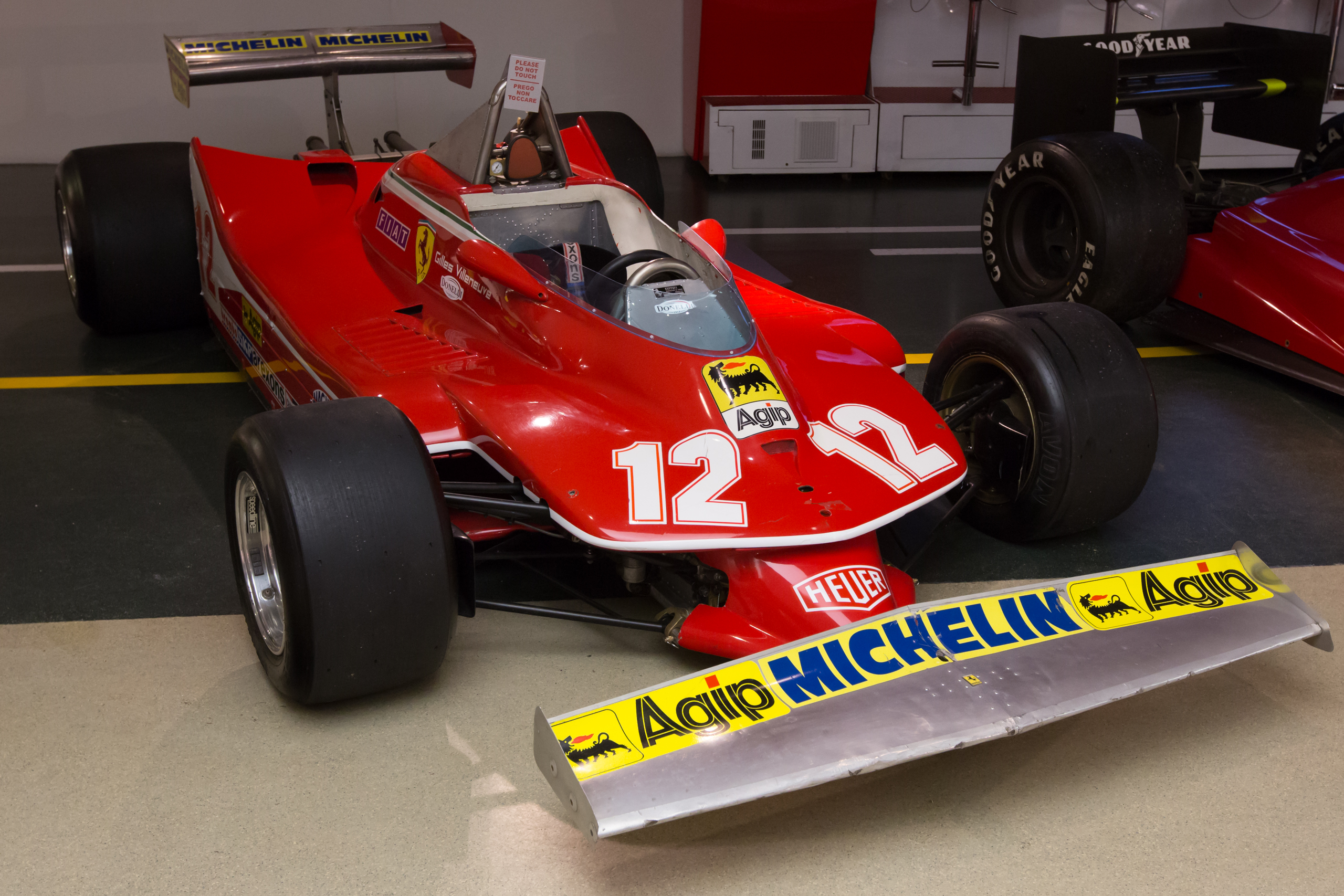
Ferrari won the International Cup for F1 Constructors with its 312T3 and 312T4 (pictured) models.

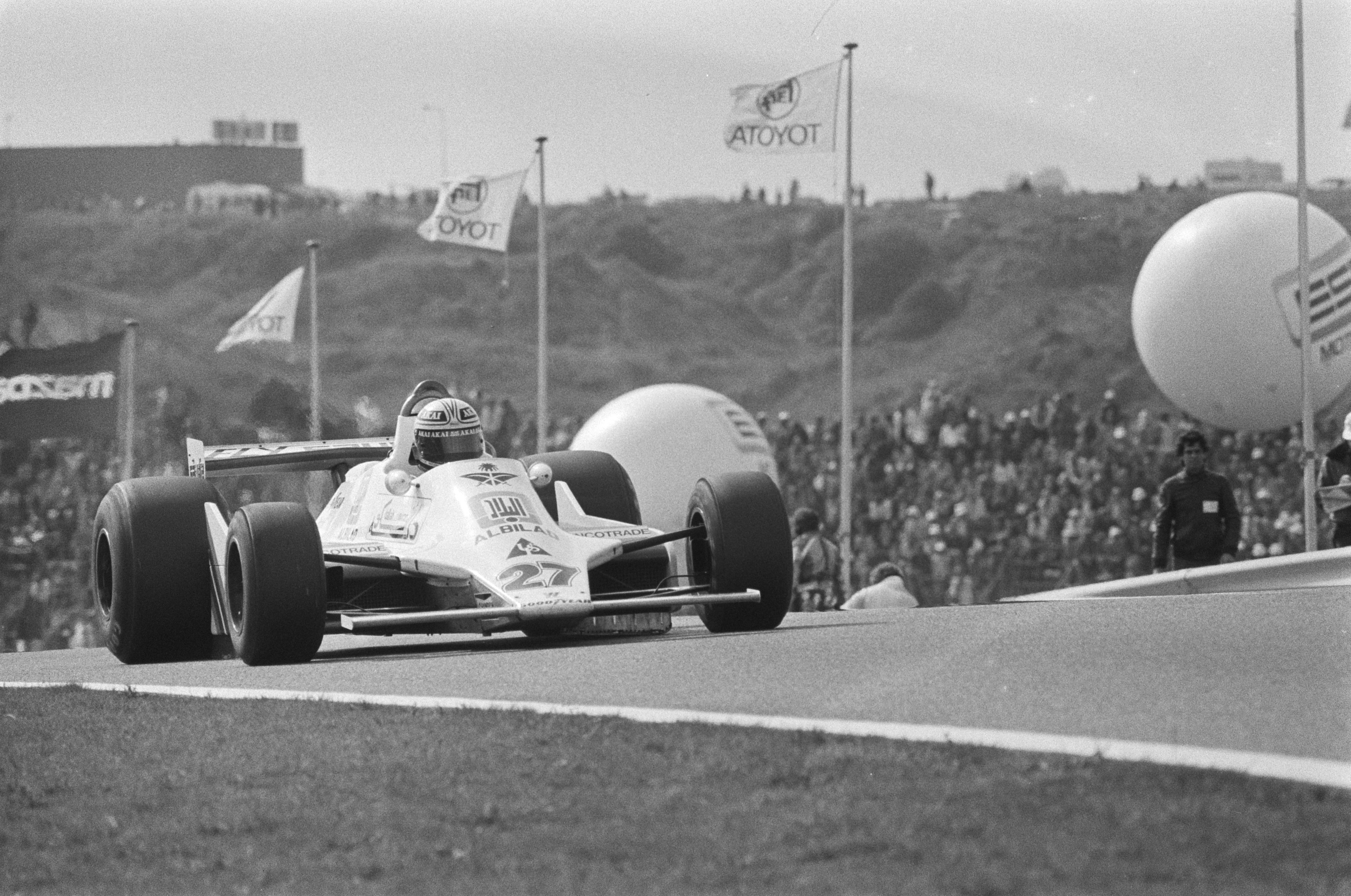
Williams placed second with its FW06 and FW07 (pictured) models.

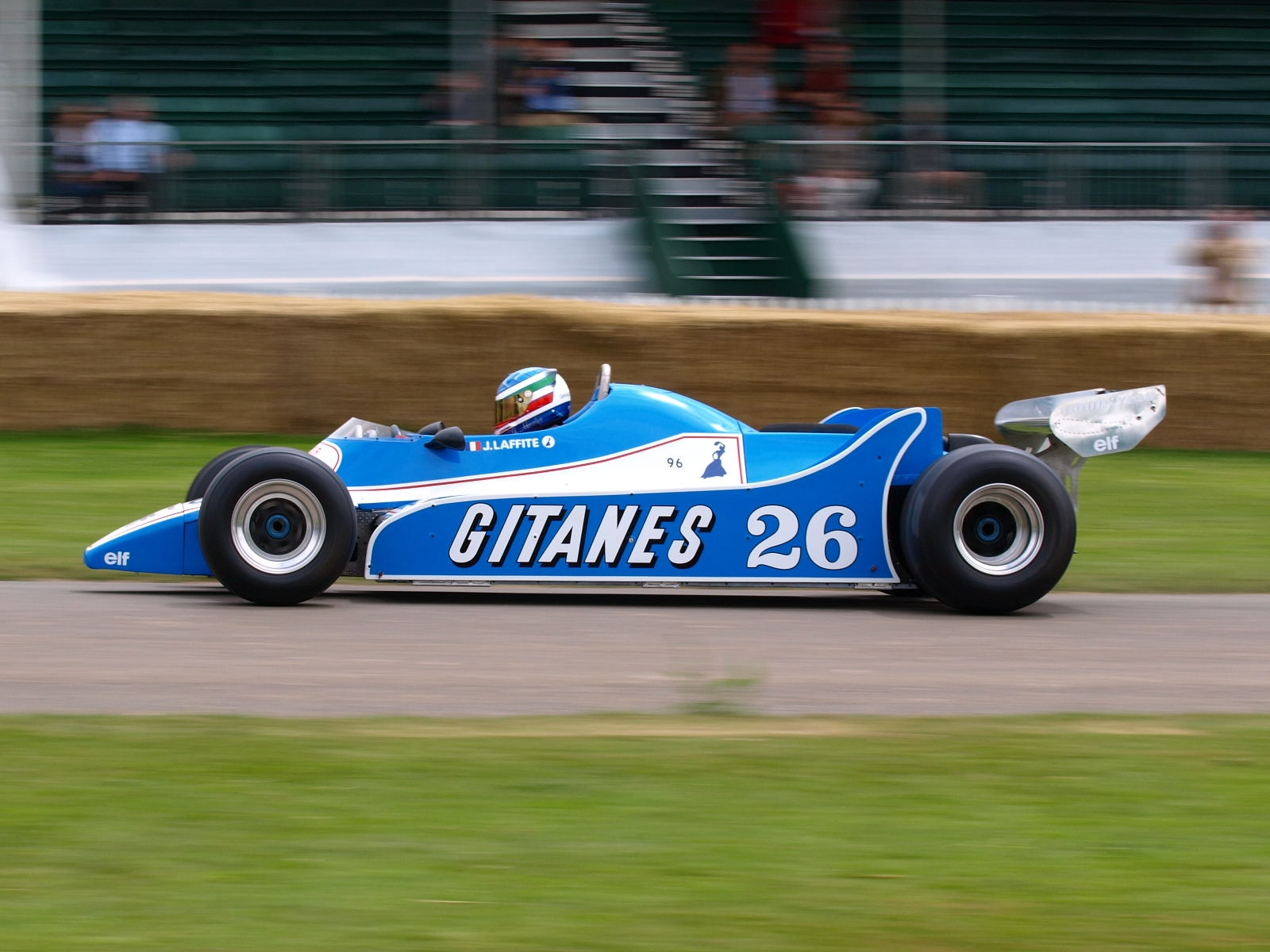
Ligier placed third with its JS11 model.

The 1979 Formula One season was the 33rd season of FIA Formula One motor racing. It featured the 1979 World Championship of F1 Drivers and the 1979 International Cup for F1 Constructors which were contested concurrently over a fifteen-round series which commenced on 21 January 1979, and ended on 7 October 1979. The season also included three non-championship Formula One races.

Jody Scheckter won the Drivers' Championship and, with teammate Gilles Villeneuve in second place, Ferrari won the Constructors' Championship. This was the team's fourth Constructors' Championship in five years, and more would follow, but it would be their last Drivers' Championship for the next 21 years. As of 2026, Scheckter remains the first and only driver from an African country to win the World Championship.

This was the final season for 1976 F1 world champion James Hunt.

== Drivers and constructors ==
The following drivers and constructors contested the 1979 World Championship of F1 Drivers and the 1979 International Cup for F1 Constructors.

Entrant	Constructor	Chassis	Engine	Tyres	No	Driver	Rounds
(United Kingdom) Martini Racing Team Lotus	Lotus-Ford	79; 80	Ford Cosworth DFV 3.0 V8	G	1	(United States) Mario Andretti	All
(United Kingdom) Martini Racing Team Lotus	Lotus-Ford	79; 80	Ford Cosworth DFV 3.0 V8	G	2	(Argentina) Carlos Reutemann	All
(United Kingdom) Team Tyrrell (United Kingdom) Candy Tyrrell Team	Tyrrell-Ford	009	Ford Cosworth DFV 3.0 V8	G	3	(France) Didier Pironi	All
(United Kingdom) Team Tyrrell (United Kingdom) Candy Tyrrell Team	Tyrrell-Ford	009	Ford Cosworth DFV 3.0 V8	G	4	(France) Jean-Pierre Jarier	1–9, 12–15
(United Kingdom) Team Tyrrell (United Kingdom) Candy Tyrrell Team	Tyrrell-Ford	009	Ford Cosworth DFV 3.0 V8	G	4	(United Kingdom) Geoff Lees	10
(United Kingdom) Team Tyrrell (United Kingdom) Candy Tyrrell Team	Tyrrell-Ford	009	Ford Cosworth DFV 3.0 V8	G	4	(Republic of Ireland) Derek Daly	11
(United Kingdom) Team Tyrrell (United Kingdom) Candy Tyrrell Team	Tyrrell-Ford	009	Ford Cosworth DFV 3.0 V8	G	33	(Republic of Ireland) Derek Daly	14–15
(United Kingdom) Parmalat Racing	Brabham-Alfa Romeo	BT46; BT48	Alfa Romeo 115-12 3.0 F12; Alfa Romeo 1260 3.0 V12	G	5	(Austria) Niki Lauda	1–13
(United Kingdom) Parmalat Racing	Brabham-Alfa Romeo	BT46; BT48	Alfa Romeo 115-12 3.0 F12; Alfa Romeo 1260 3.0 V12	G	6	(Brazil) Nelson Piquet	1–13
(United Kingdom) Parmalat Racing	Brabham-Ford	BT49	Ford Cosworth DFV 3.0 V8	G	5	(Argentina) Ricardo Zunino	14–15
(United Kingdom) Parmalat Racing	Brabham-Ford	BT49	Ford Cosworth DFV 3.0 V8	G	6	(Brazil) Nelson Piquet	14–15
(United Kingdom) Marlboro Team McLaren (United Kingdom) Löwenbräu Team McLaren	McLaren-Ford	M26; M28; M28B; M28C; M29	Ford Cosworth DFV 3.0 V8	G	7	(United Kingdom) John Watson	All
(United Kingdom) Marlboro Team McLaren (United Kingdom) Löwenbräu Team McLaren	McLaren-Ford	M26; M28; M28B; M28C; M29	Ford Cosworth DFV 3.0 V8	G	8	(France) Patrick Tambay	All
(West Germany) ATS Wheels	ATS-Ford	D2; D3	Ford Cosworth DFV 3.0 V8	G	9	(West Germany) Hans-Joachim Stuck	All
(Italy) SEFAC Ferrari	Ferrari	312T3; 312T4; 312T4B	Ferrari 015 3.0 F12	M	11	(South Africa) Jody Scheckter	All
(Italy) SEFAC Ferrari	Ferrari	312T3; 312T4; 312T4B	Ferrari 015 3.0 F12	M	12	(Canada) Gilles Villeneuve	All
(Brazil) Fittipaldi Automotive	Fittipaldi-Ford	F5A; F6; F6A	Ford Cosworth DFV 3.0 V8	G	14	(Brazil) Emerson Fittipaldi	All
(Brazil) Fittipaldi Automotive	Fittipaldi-Ford	F5A; F6; F6A	Ford Cosworth DFV 3.0 V8	G	19	(Brazil) Alex Ribeiro	14–15
(France) Équipe Renault Elf	Renault	RS01; RS10	Renault-Gordini EF1 1.5 V6 t	M	15	(France) Jean-Pierre Jabouille	All
(France) Équipe Renault Elf	Renault	RS01; RS10	Renault-Gordini EF1 1.5 V6 t	M	16	(France) René Arnoux	All
(United Kingdom) Samson Shadow Racing (United Kingdom) Interscope Shadow Racing (United Kingdom) Shadow Racing	Shadow-Ford	DN9	Ford Cosworth DFV 3.0 V8	G	17	(Netherlands) Jan Lammers	All
(United Kingdom) Samson Shadow Racing (United Kingdom) Interscope Shadow Racing (United Kingdom) Shadow Racing	Shadow-Ford	DN9	Ford Cosworth DFV 3.0 V8	G	18	(Italy) Elio de Angelis	All
(Canada) Olympus Cameras Wolf Racing (Canada) Michelob Wolf Racing	Wolf-Ford	WR7; WR8; WR9	Ford Cosworth DFV 3.0 V8	G	20	(United Kingdom) James Hunt	1–7
(Canada) Olympus Cameras Wolf Racing (Canada) Michelob Wolf Racing	Wolf-Ford	WR7; WR8; WR9	Ford Cosworth DFV 3.0 V8	G	20	(Finland) Keke Rosberg	8–15
(United Kingdom) Team Ensign	Ensign-Ford	N177; N179	Ford Cosworth DFV 3.0 V8	G	22	(Republic of Ireland) Derek Daly	1–7
(United Kingdom) Team Ensign	Ensign-Ford	N177; N179	Ford Cosworth DFV 3.0 V8	G	22	(France) Patrick Gaillard	8–12
(United Kingdom) Team Ensign	Ensign-Ford	N177; N179	Ford Cosworth DFV 3.0 V8	G	22	(Switzerland) Marc Surer	13–15
(Italy) Team Merzario	Merzario-Ford	A1B; A2; A4	Ford Cosworth DFV 3.0 V8	G	24	(Italy) Arturo Merzario	1–6, 8–15
(Italy) Team Merzario	Merzario-Ford	A1B; A2; A4	Ford Cosworth DFV 3.0 V8	G	24	(Italy) Gianfranco Brancatelli	7
(France) Ligier Gitanes	Ligier-Ford	JS11	Ford Cosworth DFV 3.0 V8	G	25	(France) Patrick Depailler	1–7
(France) Ligier Gitanes	Ligier-Ford	JS11	Ford Cosworth DFV 3.0 V8	G	25	(Belgium) Jacky Ickx	8–15
(France) Ligier Gitanes	Ligier-Ford	JS11	Ford Cosworth DFV 3.0 V8	G	26	(France) Jacques Laffite	All
(United Kingdom) Albilad-Saudia Racing Team	Williams-Ford	FW06; FW07	Ford Cosworth DFV 3.0 V8	G	27	(Australia) Alan Jones	All
(United Kingdom) Albilad-Saudia Racing Team	Williams-Ford	FW06; FW07	Ford Cosworth DFV 3.0 V8	G	28	(Switzerland) Clay Regazzoni	All
(United Kingdom) Warsteiner Arrows Racing Team	Arrows-Ford	A1; A2	Ford Cosworth DFV 3.0 V8	G	29	(Italy) Riccardo Patrese	All
(United Kingdom) Warsteiner Arrows Racing Team	Arrows-Ford	A1; A2	Ford Cosworth DFV 3.0 V8	G	30	(West Germany) Jochen Mass	All
(Mexico) Team Rebaque	Lotus-Ford	79	Ford Cosworth DFV 3.0 V8	G	31	(Mexico) Héctor Rebaque	1–6, 8–12
(Mexico) Team Rebaque	Rebaque-Ford	HR100	Ford Cosworth DFV 3.0 V8	G	31	(Mexico) Héctor Rebaque	13–15
(Italy) Autodelta	Alfa Romeo	177; 179	Alfa Romeo 115-12 3.0 F12; Alfa Romeo 1260 3.0 V12	G	35	(Italy) Bruno Giacomelli	6, 8, 13, 15
(Italy) Autodelta	Alfa Romeo	177; 179	Alfa Romeo 115-12 3.0 F12; Alfa Romeo 1260 3.0 V12	G	36	(Italy) Vittorio Brambilla	13–15
(Germany) Willi Kauhsen Racing Team	Kauhsen-Ford	WK	Ford Cosworth DFV 3.0 V8	G	36	(Italy) Gianfranco Brancatelli	5–6

=== Team and driver changes ===
Several high-profile changes happened among the leading teams for this season, as the death of Swedish driver Ronnie Peterson the previous September precipitated a merry-go-round of some of the most highly regarded drivers on the grid:

- Reigning champions Team Lotus signed Carlos Reutemann from Ferrari to replace Peterson. Ferrari took on Jody Scheckter to fill the gap, and the Wolf team hired James Hunt in his place.
- McLaren had originally signed Peterson to replace Hunt but when Peterson was killed, fellow British contender John Watson was signed instead. His place at Brabham was taken by the highly regarded but inexperienced Nelson Piquet, who had driven for them at the final race of last season.
- Tyrrell attracted ex-Lotus driver Jean-Pierre Jarier instead of Patrick Depailler, who moved to Ligier. The French team had acquired Matra's assets for their entrance in Formula 1, but lost their factory support before the 1979 season. They secured a deal for Ford-Cosworth engines, just like the majority of teams.
- Clay Regazzoni moved from Shadow to Williams, while René Arnoux moved to Renault for his second season. Both teams expanded their operations to two cars for the first time.
- Hans-Joachim Stuck had moved to ATS, so Shadow had two open seats. They signed Jan Lammers and Elio de Angelis, both making their F1 debuts.
- Arrows replaced Rolf Stommelen with Jochen Mass.

==== Mid-season changes ====
- Following a string of races in which he failed to finish, James Hunt retired from driving halfway through the season to join BBC Sport as a commentator. His seat was taken by future champion Keke Rosberg.
- Patrick Depailler suffered a hang gliding accident in June and broke both legs. Ligier, who were supported by the French government, were forced to find a French replacement driver, which they found in French-speaking Belgian Jacky Ickx. It was Ickx's last F1 drive.
- Derek Daly was let go by the Ensign team and replaced by debutant Patrick Gaillard, who did not provide better results. Finally, Formula Two champion Marc Surer picked up the drive. He did not deliver, but for him, it was a good entry into the sport and he would eventually spend eight years in F1.
- Jean-Pierre Jarier missed two races due to liver issues.
- After driving a privatised Lotus 79, Héctor Rebaque debuted with his self-made chassis, the Rebaque HR100 in the Italian Grand Prix.
- In 1976, Alfa Romeo returned to F1 as engine supplier to Brabham, but designer Carlo Chiti persuaded the manufacturer to develop their own chassis. The Alfa Romeo 177 made its debut at the 1979 Belgian Grand Prix. They quit the supply deal with Brabham, leaving them to switch to Ford-Cosworth V8's with two races to go in the year. According to Niki Lauda, this was not a step forward: during the first practice session with the V8, the Austrian suddenly retired the car and quit the team, as he had no more desire to "continue the silliness of driving around in circles". Test driver Ricardo Zunino took his place.
- Fittipaldi expanded to two cars with two races to go in the season.

== Calendar ==
Round	Grand Prix	Circuit	Date
1	Argentine Grand Prix	(Argentina) Autodromo de Buenos Aires, Buenos Aires	21 January
2	Brazilian Grand Prix	(Brazil) Autodromo de Interlagos, São Paulo	4 February
3	South African Grand Prix	(South Africa) Kyalami Grand Prix Circuit, Midrand	3 March
4	United States Grand Prix West	(United States) Long Beach Street Circuit, Long Beach	8 April
5	Spanish Grand Prix	(Spain) Circuito Permanente del Jarama, Madrid	29 April
6	Belgian Grand Prix	(Belgium) Circuit Zolder, Heusden-Zolder	13 May
7	Monaco Grand Prix	Circuit de Monaco, Monte Carlo	27 May
8	French Grand Prix	(France) Dijon-Prenois, Prenois	1 July
9	British Grand Prix	(United Kingdom) Silverstone Circuit, Silverstone	14 July
10	German Grand Prix	(West Germany) Hockenheimring, Hockenheim	29 July
11	Austrian Grand Prix	(Austria) Österreichring, Spielberg	12 August
12	Dutch Grand Prix	(Netherlands) Circuit Park Zandvoort, Zandvoort	26 August
13	Italian Grand Prix	(Italy) Autodromo Nazionale di Monza, Monza	9 September
14	Canadian Grand Prix	(Canada) Île Notre-Dame Circuit, Montréal	30 September
15	United States Grand Prix	(United States) Watkins Glen Grand Prix Course, New York	7 October

=== Calendar changes ===
- The Spanish Grand Prix was moved up six weeks, ahead of the Belgian and Monaco Grand Prix. Those two races also swapped places compared to 1978.
- The Swedish Grand Prix was originally scheduled to be held on 17 June at Anderstorp Raceway, but was cancelled as enthusiasm for Formula One in Sweden had faded as a result of the deaths of Swedish drivers Ronnie Peterson and Gunnar Nilsson. There was never another Swedish Grand Prix.
- The French Grand Prix was moved from Circuit Paul Ricard to Dijon-Prenois, in keeping with the event-sharing arrangement between the two circuits. Likewise, the British Grand Prix was moved from Brands Hatch to Silverstone.
- The United States Grand Prix and Canadian Grand Prix swapped places on the calendar. The race at Watkins Glen now hosted the season finale.

== Regulation changes ==
- The cockpit opening was to be made bigger.
- It was stipulated for the first time that an F1 car had to have two rear-view mirrors.

== Season report ==
=== Pre-season ===
The domination of the Lotus 79 meant that all the teams had to build new "ground-effect" cars for the 1979 season. Team Lotus, aiming to stay one step ahead, was designing the new Lotus 80. Cigarette maker John Player Special withdrew from F1 and Olympus moved to Wolf and Lotus landed a new sponsorship package with Martini, Tissot and Essex Petroleum. Mario Andretti was retained and Carlos Reutemann had been signed to drive even before Ronnie Peterson's death at Monza. Peterson had signed a deal to join McLaren, to replace James Hunt. After Peterson was killed McLaren turned to John Watson, who was out of work having been dropped by Brabham.

The McLaren team produced a new McLaren M28 for Watson and Patrick Tambay to drive. Hunt had received a huge offer to drive for Wolf Racing with Harvey Postlethwaite designing a new WR7. Jody Scheckter had joined Gilles Villeneuve at Ferrari and the team produced the ungainly 312T4, which was handicapped aerodynamically by the flat-12 engine, which made ground-effect difficult. The engine was however very powerful.

Ligier expanded to two cars with Patrick Depailler being hired from Tyrrell to partner Jacques Laffite. The team gave up with the old Matra engine and ran Cosworths instead and Gerard Ducarouge designed the JS11. Williams also expanded to two cars and signed Clay Regazzoni to partner Alan Jones while Patrick Head finished off the new FW07 design.

Also expanding was Renault Sport which hired Rene Arnoux to partner Jean-Pierre Jabouille. The pair started the year with the old RS01 while the new RS10 was finished. Brabham had a new Alfa Romeo V12 engine and Niki Lauda was joined by rising star Nelson Piquet in the Parmalat-sponsored team. Tyrrell was struggling for money as Elf had decided to put its money behind Renault and First National City Travelers Checks had decided not to continue. The team had hired Jean-Pierre Jarier to partner Didier Pironi and Maurice Philippe designed a new 008 chassis.

Arrows hired Jochen Mass to partner Riccardo Patrese and continued with the A1 chassis, although the bullet-nosed A2 was under development. ATS hired Hans Stuck to drive its new D3 chassis while Ensign had Derek Daly, Fittipaldi continued with his own car while Shadow was left without any drivers and so hired youngsters Elio de Angelis and Jan Lammers to drive. Surtees and Theodore disappeared while Hector Rebaque bought a 1978 Lotus and pushed ahead with his own car. Arturo Merzario was also struggling on with his own design, while Kauhsen and Alfa Romeo were both preparing their own teams.

=== Race 1: Argentina ===
Like in previous years, the opening race of the season was in Argentina at the Buenos Aires circuit located on the outskirts of the capital city. Most people expected the Lotus cars driven by defending champion Mario Andretti, and his new teammate Carlos Reutemann to dominate but, to many people's surprise, it was the Ligier team that dominated qualifying, with Jacques Laffite on pole ahead of Patrick Depailler, leaving home favorite Reutemann to qualify third, with Jarier fourth ahead of Scheckter, Watson, Andretti, Pironi, Tambay and Villeneuve. Laffite led at the start with Depailler following, but the two men starting on the third row, John Watson in the McLaren collided with Jody Scheckter's Ferrari at the very fast first 2 corners, creating chaos behind. The resulting accident involved Pironi, Tambay, Piquet, Merzario and Andretti; Piquet was taken to hospital) and the race was red-flagged, and aside from Piquet's injury, no one else was injured.

The race restarted after the mess was cleared, and this time Depailler set off into the lead with Jean-Pierre Jarier's Tyrrell and Watson (in his spare car) following him. But soon Laffite was up to second, and a few laps later he took the lead from Depailler. The Ligiers drove away, whereas Jarier struggled and dropped down the order with engine troubles, leaving Watson third before he was passed by a recovering Reutemann. Reutemann drove a stirring race in front of his home crowd, but it wasn't enough as Laffite went on and won comfortably, but teammate Depailler suffered a misfire and dropped to fourth, leaving Reutemann second and Watson third.

=== Race 2: Brazil ===
The drivers stayed in South America for the second round which was held in Brazil, returning to the 5-mile Interlagos circuit in São Paulo; the longest circuit on the calendar. The Ligiers were in top form again, Laffite taking pole comfortably with Depailler alongside, with the Lotuses led by Reutemann on the second row.

The second row featured the Lotuses of Carlos Reutemann and Mario Andretti and the third row featured the Ferraris of Gilles Villeneuve and Jody Scheckter. Jean-Pierre Jabouille put his Renault seventh, just ahead of Didier Pironi's Tyrrell. The top 10 was completed by Emerson Fittipaldi (Fittipaldi) and James Hunt (Wolf). Brabham was in trouble on this occasion with Niki Lauda down in 12th place and the hobbling Nelson Piquet 22nd.

This time, Laffite was able to lead right from the first corner with Reutemann taking second from Depailler, but Depailler regained the place soon after and Andretti also passed his teammate to take third. Andretti however soon retired with a misfire, and so Reutemann was back in third. In the race Laffite took the lead while Reutemann briefly grabbed second place before Depailler seized it back again. Reutemann lost third place as well as Andretti went past him. Behind them came Scheckter and Fittipaldi. Fittipaldi then overtook Scheckter and moved to fourth when Andretti's Lotus began to misfire and went into the pits. Piquet retired from his first home race after losing his front wing in an attempt to overtake Regazzoni, who later also collided with Tambay, eliminating Tambay. Fittipaldi then attacked Reutemann while behind them Scheckter came under pressure from Pironi. Pironi got ahead but then spun and found himself behind again. He repeated the overtaking move and began to pull away from the Ferrari. On the twenty-second lap Fittipaldi's fine charge ended when a rear wheel worked itself loose and he had to pit. Both Ferraris pitted for new tires and Villeneuve got ahead and they finished fifth and sixth behind Laffite, Depailler, Reutemann and Pironi. Laffite dominated as he had in Buenos Aires, completing his clean sweep of the South American segment of this Formula One season, although he was pushed by Depailler all the way – Depailler finished 2nd to Laffite to complete a 1–2 for Ligier and Reutemann completing the podium.

=== Race 3: South Africa ===
External videos
- South African Grand Prix, 1979. AP Archive – British Movietone News footage.

There was a four-week break between the Brazilian and South African GPs and the battle for control of the sport between the Formula One Constructors Association and the newly formed FISA under Jean-Marie Balestre was heating up but the South African race went ahead anyway. At the high-altitude Kyalami circuit between Johannesburg and Pretoria, Ferrari debuted their new ground-effect 312T4 to replace the 312T3 at this race, which had been used for the South American rounds; teams often debuted their new cars after the Argentine and Brazilian rounds, although some often debuted their new cars in Argentina, like Ligier, Brabham and Tyrrell. Since the dominant Ligier performances in South America the opposition had been working hard to perfect ground-effect technology. There were no changes in the driver lineup but after practice there was the rather surprising sight of the old non-ground effect Renault RS1 of Jean-Pierre Jabouille on pole position. This was largely due to the extra horsepower the car had at high altitude. Jabouille was ahead of the Ferraris of Scheckter and Villeneuve. Niki Lauda was fourth fastest in the Brabham while the two Ligiers were fifth and sixth, Patrick Depailler setting a faster time than Jacques Laffite. The top 10 was completed by Didier Pironi's Tyrrell, Mario Andretti's Lotus, Jean-Pierre Jarier's Tyrrell and the second Renault of René Arnoux.

It was overcast when the race started but Jabouille stayed ahead of Scheckter and Villeneuve, even banging wheels through the fast Barbecue and Jukskei corners. Within a few moments however a cloudburst resulted in the race being stopped but before that happened Villeneuve had managed to get ahead of Scheckter and Jabouille. As a result, he was on pole for the restart. The weather was still uncertain and several drivers (notably Scheckter, Depailler, Patrick Tambay (McLaren) and Nelson Piquet (Brabham) decided to race on slicks. At the restart Villeneuve was able to build up a lead but as the track dried it became clear that the men who had gambled on slicks were in a much better position and Scheckter took the lead when Villeneuve pitted on lap 15. He rejoined second ahead of Tambay and Piquet. Villeneuve charged after Scheckter. Piquet began to suffer engine trouble and fell behind Jarier and Andretti and a few laps later the pair were also ahead of Tambay. Jabouille then moved back up to fifth with Reutemann and Laffite following him until the Renault engine failed again. With Laffite having spun off because of a puncture, Reutemann moved to fifth.

When the race restarted, most drivers were on wets, but Scheckter and a few others opted for slicks. Villeneuve led at the restart and built up a gap, but the track dried and he had to pit for slicks along with most of the field. This left Scheckter leading comfortably, and he looked well set for a home win until he had to pit for new tyres, handing the lead back to Villeneuve and in behind, Patrick Tambay briefly ran third in his McLaren, until he was passed by Jarier. It was Villeneuve who won the race with Scheckter close behind, and Jarier taking the final spot on the podium. On lap 52 Scheckter pitted for new tires and so Villeneuve took the lead with Scheckter now chasing him. The gap closed to within four seconds at the flag but victory went to Villeneuve, with Scheckter 2nd for a Ferrari 1–2. Jarier was a distant third with Andretti fourth, Reutemann fifth and Lauda sixth. Piquet nursed his car to seventh.

=== Race 4: United States West ===
Five weeks after the South African race, the field went to the United States to compete at the gruelling Long Beach street circuit near Los Angeles, California. There were no changes in the driver lineup for Long Beach and South African GP winner Gilles Villeneuve took pole position in his 312T4. His former Ferrari teammate Reutemann was second in the Lotus while Scheckter was third quickest ahead of the two Ligiers of Depailler and Laffite. Home favorite Mario Andretti completed the top six in his Lotus while the top 10 was rounded off by Jean-Pierre Jarier's Tyrrell, James Hunt (Wolf), Riccardo Patrese (Arrows) and Alan Jones (Williams). The Brabhams were again not very competitive with Niki Lauda 11th and Nelson Piquet 12th while Jan Lammers did a good job to put his Shadow 14th. The McLarens were uncompetitive with John Watson and Patrick Tambay 18th and 19th. It was a disastrous practice for Renault as Arnoux and Jabouille were breaking gearboxes all throughout practice, so the Renault team decided to withdraw their entries on grounds of safety.

The starting procedure was a mess with Reutemann being forced to start from the pits half a lap behind because of an electrical failure. Villeneuve overshot his grid position and decided to lead the field around again. When the grid arrived on the grid for the second time, Laffite's car locked up and turned sideways and so Villeneuve led half the field around again, the rest having been stopped by officials. The leaders had to then weave through the backmarkers to take up their positions. Finally the race got underway with Villeneuve taking off into the lead with Depailler holding off Scheckter to grab second. In the process the South African damaged a front wing. Further back in the field Tambay ran into the back of Lammers and was launched through the air and landed on top of Lauda's Brabham. Both cars were out.

Villeneuve thus led Depailler, Scheckter and Jarier and Andretti but it was Jarier who was on the move and he soon overtook both Scheckter and Depailler to run second. Depailler then dropped behind Scheckter and the Ferrari driver then attacked Jarier and finally on lap 27 he moved to second place. The two Ferraris were out ahead and interest centered on the battle for third with Jarier under pressure from Depailler, Andretti and Jones. The Williams driver managed to get ahead of Andretti and all three then overtook Jarier and so as the race went into its closing stages Jones was challenging Depailler. On lap 62 he got ahead, but it wasn't enough to catch Villeneuve and Scheckter, who finished 1–2. In the closing laps Depailler lost fourth gear and dropped behind Andretti, while Jarier finished sixth.

One week after Long Beach, the Race of Champions at the fast, undulating Brands Hatch circuit in southern England featured another victory for Gilles Villeneuve.

=== Race 5: Spain ===
After another long break, this time for three weeks, the Spanish Grand Prix was next, at the tight and twisty Jarama circuit near the Spanish capital of Madrid, starting a trilogy of Grands Prix at tight and twisty circuits. Lotus had the new 80 ready for Mario Andretti while Renault had a new RS10 and Williams had a pair of the new FW07s. McLaren had modified the M28 after a disappointing start to the year. The Kauhsen team made its first appearance with driver Gianfranco Brancatelli but the car was a long way off the pace and failed to qualify as did Arturo Merzario in his A2 and Derek Daly in his Ensign. At the front the Ligiers were back on top again with Jacques Laffite taking pole position from Patrick Depailler. Villeneuve was third quickest with Andretti fourth in the new Lotus. Jody Scheckter was fifth in his Ferrari with Niki Lauda and Nelson Piquet sixth and seventh in their improving, but untrustworthy Brabhams. Then came Carlos Reutemann in an old Lotus 79 and the top 10 was rounded off by Jean-Pierre Jabouille in the new Renault and Didier Pironi's Tyrrell.

At the start Depailler took the lead from Laffite while Villeneuve tried to challenge the Ligiers and dropped behind the fast-starting Reutemann. Keen to win back his place Villeneuve spun and dropped down the order. Laffite tried to find a way to pass Depailler but eventually missed a gear and blew up his engine. This left Reutemann second with Scheckter third until lap 60 when he dropped behind Lauda. The Austrian then went out with an engine failure, matching Piquet's early exit so Scheckter regained the position only to lose it a few laps later to Andretti. So Depailler won ahead of the Lotus pair of Reutemann and Andretti, while Scheckter thus had to settle for fourth place with Jarier fifth and Pironi sixth.

=== Race 6: Belgium ===
The Belgian Grand Prix at Zolder was 2 weeks after Spain, and the F1 field had grown to 28 cars with the appearance of Bruno Giacomelli in the new Alfa Romeo F1 car, the company's first official entry in the World Championship since the end of 1951. This was using the old flat-12 engines while a new car was being built for the new V12, which was being run by the Brabham team. The entry was otherwise unchanged although Tyrrell had managed to find some much-needed sponsorship from Italian domestic appliance maker Candy. Qualifying resulted in the usual story of Ligier domination with Jacques Laffite ahead of Patrick Depailler. Nelson Piquet impressed many by qualifying third in his Brabham while Alan Jones gave the first hint that the Williams FW07 was going to be a competitive car by qualifying fourth. The third row featured Mario Andretti, who had decided to use the old Lotus 79 instead of the new 80 and Gilles Villeneuve in his Ferrari. His teammate Jody Scheckter was on the fourth row, alongside Carlos Reutemann's Lotus while the top 10 was rounded off by the two Tyrrells of Jean-Pierre Jarier and Didier Pironi. Niki Lauda was 11th in his Brabham and Giacomelli was 12th in the Alfa. At the back of the grid McLaren's woes continued with Patrick Tambay failing to qualify an old M26 after John Watson destroyed the difficult M28 in testing.

At the start of the race Depailler went into the lead with Jones grabbing second from Piquet while Laffite dropped to fourth. On the second lap Scheckter collided with Clay Regazzoni's Williams and Villeneuve was also involved as he snagged the rear wheel of the Williams at the chicane. Both Ferraris were able to keep going by Regazzoni was out. Villeneuve had to pit for a new nose cone. On the fourth lap, Laffite overtook Piquet, while behind them Scheckter was able to get ahead of Andretti and soon afterwards Scheckter also overtook Piquet who was having tyre trouble after a promising start. The order settled for a while and then Laffite slipped ahead of Jones and on lap 19 took the lead. Depailler quickly dropped behind Jones as well and on lap 24 Jones went into the lead. Both Brabhams again expired with engine trouble on lap 23. Jones's hopes of victory ended on lap 40 with electrical failure and as Laffite had fallen behind Depailler again it was the second Ligier driver who went back into the lead until lap 47 when he understeered off into the barriers at the first corner and Laffite went back into the lead. Behind him was Scheckter and the Ferrari closed gradually in and on lap 54 went ahead. All this left Reutemann in third place but in the closing laps he was caught and passed by Pironi. So Scheckter won in front of Laffite, Pironi and Reutemann, while Patrese finished fifth with Watson sixth. Villeneuve finished seventh after running out of fuel on the final lap.

=== Race 7: Monaco ===
The next race was the illustrious Monaco GP, Jody Scheckter's victory in Belgium had moved the South African to the top of the standings in the World Championship with 25 points but he was only a point clear of Jacques Laffite with Lotus's Carlos Reutemann (21) and Gilles Villeneuve and Patrick Depailler (20 apiece) close behind. The title was wide open. With only 20 starters at Monaco there was a pre-qualifying session for Jochen Mass (Arrows), Hans Stuck (ATS) and Gianfranco Brancatelli (who was standing in for Merzario as he was injured and the Kauhsen team had closed its doors). With Rebaque failing to appear and Alfa Romeo staying at home only one man needed to be weeded out and the Merzario was not a match for the Arrows and the ATS, so Brancatelli went home early. Ferrari seemed to be developing faster than Ligier and the front row featured Jody Scheckter and Gilles Villeneuve in the red cars. Patrick Depailler was third in his Ligier but Niki Lauda (Brabham) was slightly fastest that Jacques Laffite (Ligier) and so took fourth place. Jean-Pierre Jarier (Tyrrell) was sixth fastest with his teammate Didier Pironi matching his time, while Mass was an impressive eighth ahead of Alan Jones (Williams) and James Hunt (Wolf). The two Lotuses were off the pace with Mario Andretti (in the Lotus 80) in 13th and Carlos Reutemann (in an old 79) 11th. McLaren had a new version of the M28 for John Watson and he qualified 14th but Patrick Tambay failed to make it in the earlier version of the car.

At the start Scheckter took the lead with Lauda getting ahead of Villeneuve and Depailler in the run to Ste Devote. Laffite was fifth with Pironi sixth and Jones seventh. On the third lap Villeneuve was able to get ahead of Lauda and set off in pursuit of Scheckter. For the next few laps it was quiet as Villeneuve closed the gap to the leader while Lauda ran third under pressure from Depailler, Laffite, Pironi, Jones and the rest. On lap 16 Pironi ran into the back of Laffite, which forced the Ligier driver into pits. Three laps later Pironi punted Depailler out of the way at the Loews Hairpin. On lap 22 Pironi tried to pass Lauda and the two collided and retired. This left Jones in third place but he survived only until lap 43 when he retired having damaged his steering. As fourth placed Jarier had disappeared with a transmission problem a little earlier Mass found himself third but he was in gearbox trouble and dropped behind Clay Regazzoni's Williams. On lap 54 Villeneuve's race ended with transmission failure and so Scheckter seemed to have everything under control. But in the closing laps Regazzoni closed in dramatically (despite a gearbox problem). At the same time Depailler was closing on Reutemann for third. The last lap provided an exciting battle but Scheckter got to the line first, four-tenths ahead of Regazzoni. Reutemann was third because Depailler's engine had blown, so fourth went to Watson with Depailler classified fifth and Mass sixth, although the German driver was seven laps behind.

=== Race 8: France ===
With the two Swedish drivers in Formula 1 having died (Ronnie Peterson after an accident at Monza and Gunnar Nilsson a few weeks later from cancer), there was no interest and therefore no money for a Swedish GP in 1979 and so there was a 5-week gap between Monaco at the end of May and the French GP at the fast Dijon-Prenois circuit.

The break was used for testing and a lot of the cars were modified. Just after Monaco James Hunt announced that he was quitting F1 and so he was replaced by Keke Rosberg. Patrick Depailler blew all hopes he had of a successful season by breaking both his legs in a hang-gliding accident and so Ligier asked Jacky Ickx to take over its second car. Derek Daly also decided that he was wasting his time with Ensign and went back to Formula Two. Ensign tried to hire Tiff Needell but he was denied a superlicence and so the drive went to Patrick Gaillard. The entry also included Bruno Giacomelli in the Alfa Romeo, Arturo Merzario and Héctor Rebaque. Renault had made a big effort to be competitive in France and the result was that Jean-Pierre Jabouille and won pole with Rene Arnoux second fastest. Then came Gilles Villeneuve (Ferrari) and Nelson Piquet (Brabham). The third row featured World Championship leader Jody Scheckter (Ferrari) and Niki Lauda in the second Brabham while the top 10 was completed by Alan Jones (Williams), Jacques Laffite (Ligier), Clay Regazzoni (Williams) and Jean-Pierre Jarier (Tyrrell). With ATS withdrawing Hans Stuck because of a fight with Goodyear only Gaillard and Merzario failed to qualify.

In the race Villeneuve took the lead with Jabouille second, Scheckter third. Arnoux made a poor start and dropped to ninth. The early part of the race witnessed Arnoux climbing back through the field. By the 10th lap he was fourth and on lap 15 he took third place. At the front Villeneuve's Ferrari began to handle less well and on lap 47 Jabouille moved ahead as Villeneuve fell back towards Arnoux. Piquet blew his chances of a good position soon afterwards by spinning from fourth place (having overtaken Scheckter) and so the place went to Jones.

In the closing laps, as Jabouille pulled away to win, a legendary battle between Arnoux and Villeneuve was to take place, cementing this race's place in F1 history. Arnoux caught Villeneuve and on lap 78 he went ahead. On the next lap, the penultimate lap, Arnoux's engine began to splutter and Villeneuve was back ahead and for the last lap the pair indulged in a wild battle as they ducked and dived and banged wheels. With half a lap to go Arnoux drifted a little wide and Villeneuve was able to go down the inside and secure second place. The two crossed the line just two-tenths of a second apart. Jones was fourth, Jarier fifth and Regazzoni sixth. Renault's first victory and the first for a turbocharged engine marked an important turning point in F1 history. The turbocharged engine had become competitive.

=== Race 9: Great Britain ===
The second half of the year started in Britain at the fastest circuit of the year, the airfield Silverstone circuit 40 miles east of Birmingham. The Williams FW07 had been improving rapidly and new modifications to correct aerodynamic leakage and a new system to keep the skirts touching the ground at all times resulted in the car being fastest in pre-British GP testing. John Watson also had a new McLaren M29, to replace the troublesome M28 and so there was much excitement as the teams gathered at Silverstone just a fortnight after Jean-Pierre Jabouille's first victory for Renault at Dijon. The Alfa Romeo team did not appear and so only Hans Stuck (ATS) and Arturo Merzario (in a new Merzario chassis, based on the Kauhsen F1 car) failed to qualify. Alan Jones was very quick in qualifying and took pole position by 0.6sec with Jabouille alongside him. Then came Nelson Piquet (Brabham), Clay Regazzoni in the second Williams, Rene Arnoux (Renault), Niki Lauda (Brabham), Watson, Carlos Reutemann and Mario Andretti (Lotus) and Jacques Laffite's Ligier. World Championship leader Jody Scheckter was a disappointing 11th while Elio de Angelis impressed by putting his Shadow 12th on the grid, ahead of Gilles Villeneuve's Ferrari and Keke Rosberg in the new Wolf WR9.

At the start Jones went into the lead with Jabouille chasing and the fast-starting Regazzoni third. Piquet ran fourth but soon spun off and so Lauda took the position although he quickly fell behind Arnoux and Villeneuve who had stormed through from the midfield. He was followed by Scheckter. Jabouille's challenge faded with his tires and on lap 17 Regazzoni moved to second place and Jabouille then headed for the pits. The stop went wrong he had to pit again and then his engine overheated. This elevated Arnoux to third place with Scheckter fourth and Villeneuve fifth. Jones remained in the lead until lap 39 when he retired with an overheating engine. Regazzoni went into the lead and won to give Frank Williams his first Grand Prix victory. Arnoux finished second with Jean-Pierre Jarier (Tyrrell) climbing through the leaders in the closing stages to take third place, ahead of Watson, the fading Scheckter and Ickx after Laffite and Villeneuve both went out with mechanical troubles.

=== Race 10: Germany ===
The tenth race of the year was held in Germany, and on the ultra-fast, straight dominated Hockenheim circuit near Stuttgart, where the entry was the same as it had been at Silverstone. Tyrrell's Jean-Pierre Jarier was in hospital with a liver problem and so the team had replaced him with Formula 2 driver Geoff Lees. Qualifying resulted in Jean-Pierre Jabouille taking pole for Renault on the fast Hockenheim track but Alan Jones was second in the Williams and Jacques Laffite seemed to be rather off than usual in the Ligier. Nelson Piquet was fourth in his Brabham, ahead of Scheckter, Regazzoni, Lauda, Pironi, Villeneuve, and Arnoux.

In the race Jones took the lead at the start with Jabouille second, Laffite third, Scheckter fourth and Regazzoni fifth. Jones held off intense pressure from Jabouille in the early stages of the race, until the latter tried too hard and spun off giving second to Laffite and third to Regazzoni. Regazzoni then closed up on Laffite and went into second place on lap 13. The Williams 1-2 lasted all the way to the finish with Laffite third and Scheckter fourth. For much of the race fifth place belonged to Villeneuve but he had to pit to have a rear wing adjusted and that gave Lauda the position for a brief moment before he suffered engine failure. Piquet then took the place but he too suffered engine failure and so the position went to John Watson (McLaren) with Jochen Mass of Arrows in sixth place, just ahead of Lees.

=== Race 11: Austria ===
The field went to the very high-speed Österreichring circuit in Austria, and in qualifying once again the Renault turbo was the car to beat, Arnoux taking his first career pole, with Jones forcing Jabouille to settle for the second row. The entry was the same as it had been in Hockenheim but there had been a change at Tyrrell with Derek Daly being brought in to stand-in for the unwell Jean-Pierre Jarier. ATS had undergone a restructuring with former Grand Prix driver Vic Elford becoming team manager and the team had the brand new D2, which had been designed by Nigel Stroud. As the Österreichring is high up in the Austrian Alps, the Renault turbo had an advantage and Rene Arnoux was on pole position with Alan Jones second. Then came Jabouille and Niki Lauda in the fastest of the two Brabham-Alfa Romeos. The third row featured Villeneuve and Regazzoni, and the top 10 was completed by Piquet, Laffite, Scheckter and Pironi.

Villeneuve made a sensational start to take the lead from Jones, Lauda and Arnoux, who made a bad start. Jabouille lost his clutch at the start and dropped to ninth but quickly caught up. Villeneuve stayed ahead until the third lap when Jones breezed ahead, while Arnoux quickly dispensed with Lauda. Arnoux then took Villeneuve for second, before Jabouille set off on a charge and took second himself until his gearbox failed. Arnoux thus settled back into second place with Villeneuve third, Scheckter fourth, Regazzoni fifth and Laffite sixth. As Laffite soon moved ahead of Regazzoni, Lauda and Piquet raced behind but yet again the Alfa Romeo engines on both Brabhams failed. Arnoux continued to chase down Jones until he suffered fuel pressure problems and dropped down to sixth place, and handing second back to Villeneuve. With the Renault challenge finished, Jones was able to cruise to victory with Villeneuve second and Laffite completing the podium after passing Scheckter on the last lap. Scheckter added to his World Championship total with fourth place and the final points went to Regazzoni and Arnoux.

=== Race 12: Holland ===
F1 arrived at the beach-side Zandvoort circuit near Amsterdam, and the fast Zandvoort circuit had been modified with an awkward chicane placed between both of the most dangerous parts of the track, the very fast Hondenvlak and Tunnel Oost corners. The chicane didn't slow down the cars much and the new corner proved to be more of a nuisance than a reduction in danger. Williams was in dominant form, the team having won three successive victories at Silverstone, Hockenheim and at the Österreichring. The scoring system meant that each driver could keep only his four best finishes from each half of the season and as Jones had collected only four points at the midway point he knew that his maximum score for the year would be 40 points. Jody Scheckter had amassed 30 points in the first part of the season and so Jones was not really a threat and the South African had picked up five points and needed only six more to be sure of beating Jones. The threat to Ferrari from Ligier and Lotus had faded completely. Scheckter's only real challenge therefore came from his teammate Villeneuve but as he was the Ferrari number two driver, Scheckter's position was solid. The only change in the driver lineup was the return to action of Jean-Pierre Jarier after being out of action with hepatitis for two races. In qualifying Arnoux was on pole from Jones, Regazzoni, Jabouille and the two Ferraris, Scheckter ahead of Villeneuve on this occasion. The top 10 was completed by Laffite, Keke Rosberg (Wolf), Lauda and Pironi.

At the start Jones took the lead but Arnoux found himself in a sandwich with Regazzoni on the inside and Jabouille and Villeneuve on the outside. Arnoux thus collided with Regazzoni (the Williams losing its left front wheel) and Arnoux damaging his rear suspension. Thus Jones was followed into the first corner by Villeneuve, Jabouille and Pironi. Scheckter was left behind and started at the very back of the field. Lauda did not last long as he had hurt his wrist in a Procar accident and he was forced to withdraw. While Scheckter charged up through the midfield, the order remained stable at the front although fifth-placed Laffite dropped away early on because of a misfire. Rosberg took over. On lap 11 Villeneuve overtook Jones on the outside at Tarzan Corner to grab the lead and on the next lap Rosberg moved the Wolf ahead of Pironi's Tyrrell in fourth place. Pironi later drifted behind Scheckter who then caught and passed Rosberg and profited from Jabouille's retirement with a clutch failure.

On lap 47 Villeneuve spun and Jones went back into the lead (despite having gearbox trouble) and four laps later Villeneuve's left rear tire exploded and he spun again. He rejoined and drove an entire lap on three wheels. When he got to the pits the suspension was too badly damaged to continue. So Jones won again for Williams while Scheckter finished second and after Pironi went out with a suspension failure third place went to Laffite with Piquet fourth, Jacky Ickx fifth for Ligier and Jochen Mass sixth in his Arrows.

=== Race 13: Italy ===
The Italian Grand Prix at the very fast Monza Autodrome near Milan was next, and the Milan Auto Club's response to driver's concerns about the safety and almost total lack of run off at the Monza Park circuit had been responded to, with huge improvements in safety added to the circuit, including new and expansive run off areas at the Lesmos and the Curva Grande, and a new track surface. The field was slightly larger than normal at Monza with the return to the World Championship of Alfa Romeo which fielded a new 179 chassis for Bruno Giacomelli and the old 177 for Vittorio Brambilla, back in action for the first time since the crash at Monza the previous season. Ensign decided to give Formula Two star Marc Surer a run in its car in place of Patrick Gaillard, while Hector Rebaque had his HR100 chassis ready for the first time. In qualifying it was no surprise to see the powerful Renault turbos first and second with Jean-Pierre Jabouille ahead of Rene Arnoux. Then came Scheckter, Jones, Villeneuve, and Regazzoni. The top 10 was completed by Laffite, Piquet and Lauda in the two Brabham-Alfa Romeos and Mario Andretti in the Lotus.

As usual the Renaults were slow off the line and so Scheckter grabbed the lead from Arnoux. Behind then Villeneuve grabbed third while Laffite made a good start to get into fourth place. Jones dropped to the back of the field. On the second lap Arnoux was able to pass Scheckter to take the lead and for the next few laps the five front-runners were nose-to-tail, while Regazzoni ran in a lonely sixth position. On Lap 2 Piquet tangled with Regazzoni and had a huge accident at Curva Grande that tore off the back half of the Brabham. Arnoux's lead lasted until lap 13 when Arnoux's car began to misfire and he dropped away leaving Scheckter, Villeneuve, Laffite and Jabouille by themselves. Later in the race Jabouille dropped away with engine trouble and Laffite stopped with a similar problem and so third place went to Regazzoni with Lauda, Andretti and Jarier picking up the other points.

Jody Scheckter and Gilles Villeneuve finished the race in first and second place. As a result, Scheckter won the Drivers' Championship and Ferrari won the Constructors' Championship. Clay Regazzoni finished 3rd, ahead of Lauda, Andretti and Jarier.

One week after the Italian GP, the non-championship Dino Ferrari Grand Prix at the Imola circuit near Bologna was held, this race was won by Niki Lauda.

=== Race 14: Canada ===
At the Île Notre-Dame Circuit in Montreal for the Canadian Grand Prix, it was Lauda in the news, announcing in the middle of practice that he no longer wanted to be a Formula 1 driver, after completing a few laps in the all-new Brabham-Cosworth BT49. Brabham boss Bernie Ecclestone decided to put Argentina's Ricardo Zunino in the car. The other changes to the field were a third Tyrrell for Derek Daly and a second Fittipaldi for Alex Ribeiro. The Alfa Romeo team appeared with two 179 chassis for Bruno Giacomelli and Vittorio Brambilla but the organizers refused to let them practice if they did not pre-qualify and the team refused to pre-qualify. After qualifying Alan Jones (Williams) was on pole position with local hero Gilles Villeneuve second in his Ferrari then came Clay Regazzoni (Williams) and Nelson Piquet in one of the new Brabham-Cosworths. Fifth on the grid was Jacques Laffite (Ligier) with Didier Pironi (Tyrrell), Jean-Pierre Jabouille (Renault), Rene Arnoux (Renault), the new World Champion Jody Scheckter (Ferrari) and Mario Andretti (Lotus) completing the top 10. Zunino qualified 19th and Hector Rebaque put his own HR100 chassis 22nd. There were political battles over whether or not Alfa Romeo would be allowed to run and eventually a compromise was reached with Brambilla allowed to run but Giacomelli being refused an entry.

In the race, which turned out to be a classic, Villeneuve took the lead at the start with Jones and Regazzoni chasing him. Piquet ran fourth but then moved ahead of Regazzoni to take third. Jones shadowed Villeneuve for the early part of the race and eventually slipped ahead at the hairpin, the two cars banging wheels. Jones was then able to stay ahead and win but Villeneuve was only a second behind him at the finish- it was revealed later by Williams engineer Frank Dernie that Jones's car was on the verge of failing right at the end. Piquet ran third until the closing laps when he dropped behind Regazzoni again and retired soon afterwards with a gearbox problem. Scheckter finished fourth with Pironi fifth and John Watson (McLaren) sixth.

=== Race 15: United States (East) ===
1 week after Canada, the teams traveled 5 hours south into the United States, to the spectacular, bumpy and fast Watkins Glen circuit in rural western New York, 4 hours from New York City. At this race, the last race of the season it saw a field of 30 cars fighting for 24 grid positions. There were no driver changes and after qualifying Alan Jones, winner of four of the previous five races, was on pole position again. The main interest of the event was whether or not Jones would finish runner-up to the new World Champion Jody Scheckter or whether his Ferrari teammate Gilles Villeneuve would be able to hold him off. Second on the grid was Nelson Piquet in the promising new Brabham-Cosworth BT49 which had appeared at the previous race. Villeneuve was third in his Ferrari with Jacques Laffite (Ligier) fourth, Clay Regazzoni (Williams) fifth and Carlos Reutemann (Lotus) sixth. The top 10 was completed by the two Renaults of Rene Arnoux and Jean-Pierre Jabouille, the Brabham of Ricardo Zunino and Didier Pironi's Tyrrell.

The area was mostly soaked with rain, and this made conditions treacherous. On Saturday, during one of the periods when it stopped raining and the track dried out, Jones took pole again from Nelson Piquet in the new Brabham BT49 in his first ever visit to Watkins Glen. Come race day, it started to rain and become windy 20 minutes before the start of the race. At the start, Villeneuve, 3rd on the grid blasted through to take the lead at the first corner. Bruno Giacomelli crashed at Turn 9 and then Jacky Ickx, in his last F1 Grand Prix in a career stretching back to 1967 with 8 Grand Prix victories spun off on Lap 3 and his teammate Laffite compounded Ligier's misery by also spinning off on Lap 4 at the fast Turn 11. The race itself was another battle between Villeneuve and Jones, with the Canadian out in front. Once Jones came in to change to dry tires, Jones left the pit lane too fast before one of the mechanics had put the left rear tire on properly; he only made it between Turns 7 and 8 before the wheel came off and he had to retire. This left Villeneuve with no challengers at all and he went on to win his third race of the year in front of Frenchmen Arnoux and Pironi.

== Results and standings ==
=== Grands Prix ===
Round	Grand Prix	Pole position	Fastest lap	Winning driver	Winning constructor	Report
1	(Argentina) Argentine Grand Prix	(France) Jacques Laffite	(France) Jacques Laffite	(France) Jacques Laffite	(France) Ligier-Ford	Report
2	(Brazil) Brazilian Grand Prix	(France) Jacques Laffite	(France) Jacques Laffite	(France) Jacques Laffite	(France) Ligier-Ford	Report
3	(South Africa) South African Grand Prix	(France) Jean-Pierre Jabouille	(Canada) Gilles Villeneuve	(Canada) Gilles Villeneuve	(Italy) Ferrari	Report
4	United States Grand Prix West	(Canada) Gilles Villeneuve	(Canada) Gilles Villeneuve	(Canada) Gilles Villeneuve	(Italy) Ferrari	Report
5	(Spain) Spanish Grand Prix	(France) Jacques Laffite	(Canada) Gilles Villeneuve	(France) Patrick Depailler	(France) Ligier-Ford	Report
6	(Belgium) Belgian Grand Prix	(France) Jacques Laffite	(Canada) Gilles Villeneuve	(South Africa) Jody Scheckter	(Italy) Ferrari	Report
7	Monaco Grand Prix	(South Africa) Jody Scheckter	(France) Patrick Depailler	(South Africa) Jody Scheckter	(Italy) Ferrari	Report
8	(France) French Grand Prix	(France) Jean-Pierre Jabouille	(France) René Arnoux	(France) Jean-Pierre Jabouille	(France) Renault	Report
9	(United Kingdom) British Grand Prix	(Australia) Alan Jones	(Switzerland) Clay Regazzoni	(Switzerland) Clay Regazzoni	(United Kingdom) Williams-Ford	Report
10	(West Germany) German Grand Prix	(France) Jean-Pierre Jabouille	(Canada) Gilles Villeneuve	(Australia) Alan Jones	(United Kingdom) Williams-Ford	Report
11	(Austria) Austrian Grand Prix	(France) René Arnoux	(France) René Arnoux	(Australia) Alan Jones	(United Kingdom) Williams-Ford	Report
12	(Netherlands) Dutch Grand Prix	(France) René Arnoux	(Canada) Gilles Villeneuve	(Australia) Alan Jones	(United Kingdom) Williams-Ford	Report
13	(Italy) Italian Grand Prix	(France) Jean-Pierre Jabouille	(Switzerland) Clay Regazzoni	(South Africa) Jody Scheckter	(Italy) Ferrari	Report
14	(Canada) Canadian Grand Prix	(Australia) Alan Jones	(Australia) Alan Jones	(Australia) Alan Jones	(United Kingdom) Williams-Ford	Report
15	United States Grand Prix	(Australia) Alan Jones	(Brazil) Nelson Piquet	(Canada) Gilles Villeneuve	(Italy) Ferrari	Report

=== Scoring system ===
Points were awarded to the top six classified finishers. For the first time, the International Cup for F1 Constructors counted the points of all drivers for a constructor. For the World Drivers' Championship, the best four results from rounds 1-7 and the best four results from rounds 8-15 were counted, while, for the Cup, all rounds were counted.

Numbers without parentheses are championship points; numbers in parentheses are total points scored. Points were awarded in the following system:

Position	1st	2nd	3rd	4th	5th	6th
Points	9	6	4	3	2	1

=== World Drivers' Championship standings ===
Pos	Driver	ARG (Argentina)	BRA (Brazil)	RSA (South Africa)	USW (United States)	ESP (Spain)	BEL (Belgium)	MON (Monaco)	FRA (France)	GBR (United Kingdom)	GER (West Germany)	AUT (Austria)	NED (Netherlands)	ITA (Italy)	CAN (Canada)	USA (United States)	Points
1	(South Africa) Jody Scheckter	Ret	(6)	2	2	(4)	1	1^{P}	7	(5)	4	4	2	1	(4)	Ret	51 (60)
2	(Canada) Gilles Villeneuve	Ret	5	1^{F}	1^{P}^{F}	7^{F}	7^{F}	Ret	2	14†	8^{F}	2	Ret^{F}	2	(2)	1	47 (53)
3	(Australia) Alan Jones	9	Ret	Ret	3	Ret	Ret	Ret	(4)	Ret^{P}	1	1	1	9	1^{P}^{F}	Ret^{P}	40 (43)
4	(France) Jacques Laffite	1^{P}^{F}	1^{P}^{F}	Ret	Ret	Ret^{P}	2^{P}	Ret	8	Ret	3	3	3	Ret	Ret	Ret	36
5	(Switzerland) Clay Regazzoni	10	15	9	Ret	Ret	Ret	2	(6)	1^{F}	2	(5)	Ret	3^{F}	3	Ret	29 (32)
6	(France) Patrick Depailler	4	2	Ret	5	1	Ret	(5)^{F}									20 (22)
7	(Argentina) Carlos Reutemann	2	3	(5)	Ret	2	(4)	3	13	8	Ret	Ret	Ret	7	Ret	Ret	20 (25)
8	(France) René Arnoux	Ret	Ret	Ret	DNS	9	Ret	Ret	3^{F}	2	Ret	6^{P}^{F}	Ret^{P}	Ret	Ret	2	17
9	(United Kingdom) John Watson	3	8	Ret	Ret	Ret	6	4	11	4	5	9	Ret	Ret	6	6	15
10	(France) Didier Pironi	Ret	4	Ret	DSQ	6	3	Ret	Ret	10	9	7	Ret	10	5	3	14
11	(France) Jean-Pierre Jarier	Ret	DNS	3	6	5	11	Ret	5	3			Ret	6	Ret	Ret	14
12	(United States) Mario Andretti	5	Ret	4	4	3	Ret	Ret	Ret	Ret	Ret	Ret	Ret	5	10	Ret	14
13	(France) Jean-Pierre Jabouille	Ret	10	Ret^{P}	DNS	Ret	Ret	NC	1^{P}	Ret	Ret^{P}	Ret	Ret	14^{P}	Ret	Ret	9
14	(Austria) Niki Lauda	Ret	Ret	6	Ret	Ret	Ret	Ret	Ret	Ret	Ret	Ret	Ret	4	WD		4
15	(Italy) Elio de Angelis	7	12	Ret	7	Ret	Ret	DNQ	16	12	11	Ret	Ret	Ret	Ret	4	3
=	(Brazil) Nelson Piquet	Ret	Ret	7	8	Ret	Ret	Ret	Ret	Ret	12	Ret	4	Ret	Ret	Ret^{F}	3
17	(Belgium) Jacky Ickx								Ret	6	Ret	Ret	5	Ret	Ret	Ret	3
18	(West Germany) Jochen Mass	8	7	12	9	8	Ret	6	15	Ret	6	Ret	6	Ret	DNQ	DNQ	3
19	(Italy) Riccardo Patrese	DNS	9	11	Ret	10	5	Ret	14	Ret	Ret	Ret	Ret	13	Ret	Ret	2
=	(West Germany) Hans-Joachim Stuck	DNQ	Ret	Ret	DSQ	14	8	Ret	DNS	DNQ	Ret	Ret	Ret	11	Ret	5	2
21	(Brazil) Emerson Fittipaldi	6	11	13	Ret	11	9	Ret	Ret	Ret	Ret	Ret	Ret	8	8	7	1
—	(Mexico) Héctor Rebaque	Ret	DNQ	Ret	Ret	Ret	Ret		12	9	Ret	DNQ	7	DNQ	Ret	DNQ	0
—	(France) Patrick Tambay	Ret	Ret	10	Ret	13	DNQ	DNQ	10	7	Ret	10	Ret	Ret	Ret	Ret	0
—	(Argentina) Ricardo Zunino														7	Ret	0
—	(United Kingdom) Geoff Lees										7						0
—	(Republic of Ireland) Derek Daly	11	13	DNQ	Ret	DNQ	DNQ	DNQ				8			Ret	Ret	0
—	(United Kingdom) James Hunt	Ret	Ret	8	Ret	Ret	Ret	Ret									0
—	(Netherlands) Jan Lammers	Ret	14	Ret	Ret	12	10	DNQ	18	11	10	Ret	Ret	DNQ	9	DNQ	0
—	(Finland) Keke Rosberg								9	Ret	Ret	Ret	Ret	Ret	DNQ	Ret	0
—	(Italy) Vittorio Brambilla													12	Ret	DNQ	0
—	(France) Patrick Gaillard								DNQ	13	DNQ	Ret	DNQ				0
—	(Italy) Bruno Giacomelli						Ret		17					Ret		Ret	0
—	(Italy) Arturo Merzario	Ret	DNQ	DNQ	Ret	DNQ	DNQ		DNQ	DNQ	DNQ	DNQ	DNQ	DNQ	DNQ	DNQ	0
—	(Switzerland) Marc Surer													DNQ	DNQ	Ret	0
—	(Italy) Gianfranco Brancatelli					DNQ	DNQ	DNPQ									0
—	(Brazil) Alex Ribeiro														DNQ	DNQ	0
Pos	Driver	ARG (Argentina)	BRA (Brazil)	RSA (South Africa)	USW (United States)	ESP (Spain)	BEL (Belgium)	MON (Monaco)	FRA (France)	GBR (United Kingdom)	GER (West Germany)	AUT (Austria)	NED (Netherlands)	ITA (Italy)	CAN (Canada)	USA (United States)	Points

Key
Colour	Result
Gold	Winner
Silver	Second place
Bronze	Third place
Green	Other points position
Blue	Other classified position
Blue	Not classified, finished (NC)
Purple	Not classified, retired (Ret)
Red	Did not qualify (DNQ)
Red	Did not pre-qualify (DNPQ)
Black	Disqualified (DSQ)
White	Did not start (DNS)
White	Race cancelled (C)
Blank	Did not practice (DNP)
Blank	Excluded (EX)
Blank	Did not arrive (DNA)
Blank	Withdrawn (WD)
Blank	Did not enter (empty cell)
Annotation	Meaning
P	Pole position
F	Fastest lap
†	Did not finish, but classified for completing over 90% of the race distance

=== International Cup for F1 Constructors standings ===
Pos	Constructor	Car no.	ARG (Argentina)	BRA (Brazil)	RSA (South Africa)	USW (United States)	ESP (Spain)	BEL (Belgium)	MON (Monaco)	FRA (France)	GBR (United Kingdom)	GER (West Germany)	AUT (Austria)	NED (Netherlands)	ITA (Italy)	CAN (Canada)	USA (United States)	Points
1	(Italy) Ferrari	11	Ret	6	2	2	4	1	1^{P}	7	5	4	4	2	1	4	Ret	113
1	(Italy) Ferrari	12	Ret	5	1^{F}	1^{P}^{F}	7^{F}	7^{F}	Ret	2	14†	8^{F}	2	Ret^{F}	2	2	1	113
2	(United Kingdom) Williams-Ford	27	9	Ret	Ret	3	Ret	Ret	Ret	4	Ret^{P}	1	1	1	9	1^{P}^{F}	Ret^{P}	75
2	(United Kingdom) Williams-Ford	28	10	15	9	Ret	Ret	Ret	2	6	1^{F}	2	5	Ret	3^{F}	3	Ret	75
3	(France) Ligier-Ford	25	4	2	Ret	5	1	Ret	5^{F}	Ret	6	Ret	Ret	5	Ret	Ret	Ret	61
3	(France) Ligier-Ford	26	1^{P}^{F}	1^{P}^{F}	Ret	Ret	Ret^{P}	2^{P}	Ret	8	Ret	3	3	3	Ret	Ret	Ret	61
4	(United Kingdom) Lotus-Ford	1	5	Ret	4	4	3	Ret	Ret	Ret	Ret	Ret	Ret	Ret	5	10	Ret	39
4	(United Kingdom) Lotus-Ford	2	2	3	5	Ret	2	4	3	13	8	Ret	Ret	Ret	7	Ret	Ret	39
4	(United Kingdom) Lotus-Ford	31	Ret	DNQ	Ret	Ret	Ret	Ret		12	9	Ret	DNQ	7				39
5	(United Kingdom) Tyrrell-Ford	3	Ret	4	Ret	DSQ	6	3	Ret	Ret	10	9	7	Ret	10	5	3	28
5	(United Kingdom) Tyrrell-Ford	4	Ret	DNS	3	6	5	11	Ret	5	3	7	8	Ret	6	Ret	Ret	28
5	(United Kingdom) Tyrrell-Ford	33														Ret	Ret	28
6	(France) Renault	15	Ret	10	Ret^{P}	DNS	Ret	Ret	NC	1^{P}	Ret	Ret^{P}	Ret	Ret	14^{P}	Ret	Ret	26
6	(France) Renault	16	Ret	Ret	Ret	DNS	9	Ret	Ret	3^{F}	2	Ret	6^{P}^{F}	Ret^{P}	Ret	Ret	2	26
7	(United Kingdom) McLaren-Ford	7	3	8	Ret	Ret	Ret	6	4	11	4	5	9	Ret	Ret	6	6	15
7	(United Kingdom) McLaren-Ford	8	Ret	Ret	10	Ret	13	DNQ	DNQ	10	7	Ret	10	Ret	Ret	Ret	Ret	15
8	(United Kingdom) Brabham-Alfa Romeo	5	Ret	Ret	6	Ret	Ret	Ret	Ret	Ret	Ret	Ret	Ret	Ret	4			7
8	(United Kingdom) Brabham-Alfa Romeo	6	Ret	Ret	7	8	Ret	Ret	Ret	Ret	Ret	12	Ret	4	Ret			7
9	(United Kingdom) Arrows-Ford	29	DNS	9	11	Ret	10	5	Ret	14	Ret	Ret	Ret	Ret	13	Ret	Ret	5
9	(United Kingdom) Arrows-Ford	30	8	7	12	9	8	Ret	6	15	Ret	6	Ret	6	Ret	DNQ	DNQ	5
10	(United Kingdom) Shadow-Ford	17	Ret	14	Ret	Ret	12	10	DNQ	18	11	10	Ret	Ret	DNQ	9	DNQ	3
10	(United Kingdom) Shadow-Ford	18	7	12	Ret	7	Ret	Ret	DNQ	16	12	11	Ret	Ret	Ret	Ret	4	3
11	(West Germany) ATS-Ford	9	DNQ	Ret	Ret	DSQ	14	8	Ret	DNS	DNQ	Ret	Ret	Ret	11	Ret	5	2
12	(Brazil) Fittipaldi-Ford	14	6	11	13	Ret	11	9	Ret	Ret	Ret	Ret	Ret	Ret	8	8	7	1
12	(Brazil) Fittipaldi-Ford	19														DNQ	DNQ	1
—	(United Kingdom) Brabham-Ford	5														7	Ret	0
—	(United Kingdom) Brabham-Ford	6														Ret	Ret^{F}	0
—	(Canada) Wolf-Ford	20	Ret	Ret	8	Ret	Ret	Ret	Ret	9	Ret	Ret	Ret	Ret	Ret	DNQ	Ret	0
—	(United Kingdom) Ensign-Ford	22	11	13	DNQ	Ret	DNQ	DNQ	DNQ	DNQ	13	DNQ	Ret	DNQ	DNQ	DNQ	Ret	0
—	(Italy) Alfa Romeo	35						Ret		17					Ret		Ret	0
—	(Italy) Alfa Romeo	36													12	Ret	DNQ	0
—	(Italy) Merzario-Ford	24	Ret	DNQ	DNQ	Ret	DNQ	DNQ	DNPQ	DNQ	DNQ	DNQ	DNQ	DNQ	DNQ	DNQ	DNQ	0
—	(Mexico) Rebaque-Ford	31													DNQ	Ret	DNQ	0
—	(West Germany) Kauhsen-Ford	36					DNQ	DNQ										0
Pos	Constructor	Car no.	ARG (Argentina)	BRA (Brazil)	RSA (South Africa)	USW (United States)	ESP (Spain)	BEL (Belgium)	MON (Monaco)	FRA (France)	GBR (United Kingdom)	GER (West Germany)	AUT (Austria)	NED (Netherlands)	ITA (Italy)	CAN (Canada)	USA (United States)	Points

== Non-championship races ==
Two other Formula One races, which did not count towards the World Championship of Drivers or the International Cup for F1 Constructors, were also held in 1979. There was also a time trial, or sprint, held at Donington, replacing a planned race that did not get regulatory approval.

Race name	Circuit	Date	Winning driver	Constructor	Report
(United Kingdom) Marlboro / Daily Mail Race of Champions	Brands Hatch	15 April	(Canada) Gilles Villeneuve	(Italy) Ferrari	Report
(United Kingdom) Gunnar Nilsson Memorial Trophy	Donington Park	3 June	(Australia) Alan Jones	(United Kingdom) Williams-Ford	Report
(Italy) Dino Ferrari Grand Prix	Imola	16 September	(Austria) Niki Lauda	(United Kingdom) Brabham-Alfa Romeo	Report
