= 1979 Brazilian Grand Prix =

- Race 2 of 15 in the 1979 Formula One season

Race details
- Date: 4 February 1979
- Location: Autódromo de Interlagos; São Paulo, Brazil
- Course: Permanent racing facility
- Course length: 7.960 km (4.946 miles)
- Distance: 40 laps, 318.400 km (197.840 miles)
- Weather: Dry

Pole position
Driver	(France) Jacques Laffite	Ligier-Ford
- Time: 2:23.07

Fastest lap
Driver	(France) Jacques Laffite	Ligier-Ford
- Time: 2:28.76 on lap 23

Podium
First	(France) Jacques Laffite	Ligier-Ford
Second	(France) Patrick Depailler	Ligier-Ford
Third	(Argentina) Carlos Reutemann	Lotus-Ford

The 1979 Brazilian Grand Prix was a Formula One motor race held at Interlagos on 4 February 1979. It was the second race of the 1979 World Championship of F1 Drivers and the 1979 International Cup for F1 Constructors.

== Qualifying ==
=== Qualifying classification ===
Pos.	No.	Driver	Constructor	Time	Grid
1	26	(France) Jacques Laffite	Ligier-Ford	2:23.07	1
2	25	(France) Patrick Depailler	Ligier-Ford	2:23.99	2
3	2	(Argentina) Carlos Reutemann	Lotus-Ford	2:24.15	3
4	1	(United States) Mario Andretti	Lotus-Ford	2:24.28	4
5	12	(Canada) Gilles Villeneuve	Ferrari	2:24.34	5
6	11	(South Africa) Jody Scheckter	Ferrari	2:24.48	6
7	15	(France) Jean-Pierre Jabouille	Renault	2:24.85	7
8	3	(France) Didier Pironi	Tyrrell-Ford	2:25.16	8
9	14	(Brazil) Emerson Fittipaldi	Fittipaldi-Ford	2:26.35	9
10	20	(United Kingdom) James Hunt	Wolf-Ford	2:26.37	10
11	16	(France) René Arnoux	Renault	2:26.43	11
12	5	(Austria) Niki Lauda	Brabham-Alfa Romeo	2:27.57	12
13	27	(Australia) Alan Jones	Williams-Ford	2:27.67	13
14	7	(United Kingdom) John Watson	McLaren-Ford	2:27.82	14
15	4	(France) Jean-Pierre Jarier	Tyrrell-Ford	2:27.89	15
16	29	(Italy) Riccardo Patrese	Arrows-Ford	2:28.08	16
17	28	(Switzerland) Clay Regazzoni	Williams-Ford	2:28.88	17
18	8	(France) Patrick Tambay	McLaren-Ford	2:29.39	18
19	30	(West Germany) Jochen Mass	Arrows-Ford	2:29.42	19
20	17	(Italy) Elio de Angelis	Shadow-Ford	2:30.29	20
21	18	(Netherlands) Jan Lammers	Shadow-Ford	2:31.60	21
22	6	(Brazil) Nelson Piquet	Brabham-Alfa Romeo	2:31.64	22
23	22	(Republic of Ireland) Derek Daly	Ensign-Ford	2:31.78	23
24	9	(West Germany) Hans-Joachim Stuck	ATS-Ford	2:32.27	24
DNQ	31	(Mexico) Héctor Rebaque	Lotus-Ford	2:32.66	—
DNQ	24	(Italy) Arturo Merzario	Merzario-Ford	2:34.08	—

== Race ==
=== Race report ===
The Ligier team dominated the race weekend with their superior ground-effect JS11. Frenchman Jacques Laffite dominated the race weekend and made the most of his superbly set-up Ligier by taking pole position, smashing Jean-Pierre Jarier's 1975 pole time by 7 seconds, setting fastest lap and leading every lap of the race up to the finish. Laffite's teammate Patrick Depailler started and finished 2nd. Laffite and the Ligier team completed their domination of the South American fortnight, Laffite also dominantly won in Argentina.

=== Classification ===
Pos	No	Driver	Constructor	Tyre	Laps	Time/Retired	Grid	Points
1	26	(France) Jacques Laffite	Ligier-Ford	G	40	1:40:09.64	1	9
2	25	(France) Patrick Depailler	Ligier-Ford	G	40	+ 5.28	2	6
3	2	(Argentina) Carlos Reutemann	Lotus-Ford	G	40	+ 44.14	3	4
4	3	(France) Didier Pironi	Tyrrell-Ford	G	40	+ 1:25.88	8	3
5	12	(Canada) Gilles Villeneuve	Ferrari	M	39	+ 1 Lap	5	2
6	11	(South Africa) Jody Scheckter	Ferrari	M	39	+ 1 Lap	6	1
7	30	(West Germany) Jochen Mass	Arrows-Ford	G	39	+ 1 Lap	19	
8	7	(United Kingdom) John Watson	McLaren-Ford	G	39	+ 1 Lap	14	
9	29	(Italy) Riccardo Patrese	Arrows-Ford	G	39	+ 1 Lap	16	
10	15	(France) Jean-Pierre Jabouille	Renault	M	39	+ 1 Lap	7	
11	14	(Brazil) Emerson Fittipaldi	Fittipaldi-Ford	G	39	+ 1 Lap	9	
12	18	(Italy) Elio de Angelis	Shadow-Ford	G	39	+ 1 Lap	20	
13	22	(Republic of Ireland) Derek Daly	Ensign-Ford	G	39	+ 1 Lap	23	
14	17	(Netherlands) Jan Lammers	Shadow-Ford	G	39	+ 1 Lap	21	
15	28	(Switzerland) Clay Regazzoni	Williams-Ford	G	38	+ 2 Laps	17	
Ret	27	(Australia) Alan Jones	Williams-Ford	G	33	Fuel System	13	
Ret	9	(West Germany) Hans-Joachim Stuck	ATS-Ford	G	31	Steering	24	
Ret	16	(France) René Arnoux	Renault	M	28	Spun Off	11	
Ret	20	(United Kingdom) James Hunt	Wolf-Ford	G	7	Steering	10	
Ret	8	(France) Patrick Tambay	McLaren-Ford	G	7	Collision	18	
Ret	5	(Austria) Niki Lauda	Brabham-Alfa Romeo	G	5	Gearbox	12	
Ret	6	(Brazil) Nelson Piquet	Brabham-Alfa Romeo	G	5	Accident	22	
Ret	1	(United States) Mario Andretti	Lotus-Ford	G	2	Fuel Leak	4	
DNS	4	(France) Jean-Pierre Jarier	Tyrrell-Ford	G	0	Electrical	15	
DNQ	31	(Mexico) Héctor Rebaque	Lotus-Ford	G				
DNQ	24	(Italy) Arturo Merzario	Merzario-Ford	G				

== Notes ==
- This was the 9th and 10th podium finish for Ligier.

== Championship standings after the race ==
Drivers' Championship standings

	Pos	Driver	Points
	1	(France) Jacques Laffite	18
	2	(Argentina) Carlos Reutemann	10
1	3	(France) Patrick Depailler	9
1	4	(United Kingdom) John Watson	4
16	5	(France) Didier Pironi	3

Constructors' Championship standings

	Pos	Constructor	Points
	1	(France) Ligier-Ford	27
	2	(United Kingdom) Lotus-Ford	12
	3	(United Kingdom) McLaren-Ford	4
3	4	(United Kingdom) Tyrrell-Ford	3
	5	(Italy) Ferrari	3

- Note: Only the top five positions are included for both sets of standings.

== Additional notes ==
- ^a Although the circuit length was quoted in MotorSport magazine as 7.873 km, the fastest lap's time/speed quoted are consistent with the 7.87385 km length, same as quoted in 1980 race report.
- ^b Although the race distance was quoted in MotorSport magazine as 314.92 km, the winner's time/speed quoted are consistent with the 314.954 km distance, same as quoted in 1980 race report.

Previous race: 1979 Argentine Grand Prix	FIA Formula One World Championship; 1979 season	Next race: 1979 South African Grand Prix
Previous race: 1978 Brazilian Grand Prix	Brazilian Grand Prix	Next race: 1980 Brazilian Grand Prix
