= 1979 Argentine Grand Prix =

- Race 1 of 15 in the 1979 Formula One season

Race details
- Date: January 21, 1979
- Location: Buenos Aires, Argentina
- Course: Permanent road course
- Course length: 5.81 km (3.61 miles)
- Distance: 53 laps, 307.93 km (191.33 miles)
- Weather: Dry

Pole position
| Driver | (France) Jacques Laffite | Ligier-Ford |
- Time: 1:44.20

Fastest lap
| Driver | (France) Jacques Laffite | Ligier-Ford |
- Time: 1:46.91 on lap 42

Podium
| First | (France) Jacques Laffite | Ligier-Ford |
| Second | (Argentina) Carlos Reutemann | Lotus-Ford |
| Third | (United Kingdom) John Watson | McLaren-Ford |

The 1979 Argentine Grand Prix was a Formula One motor race held on 21 January 1979 at the Autódromo Municipal Ciudad de Buenos Aires. The race had to be restarted because there was a huge crash at the second of the very fast esses after the pit straight that took off a number of drivers, including Jody Scheckter, Nelson Piquet, John Watson, Patrick Tambay and Mario Andretti.

After qualifying, James Hunt's WR7 was declared illegal, as the clutch-driven impeller blades which drew air through the air coiler were ruled an 'aerodynamic device'. Wolf mechanics modified the fan, and the car was allowed to start.

== Classification ==
=== Qualifying classification ===
| Pos. | No. | Driver | Constructor | Time | Grid |
|---|---|---|---|---|---|
| 1 | 26 | (France) Jacques Laffite | Ligier-Ford | 1:44.20 | 1 |
| 2 | 25 | (France) Patrick Depailler | Ligier-Ford | 1:45.24 | 2 |
| 3 | 2 | (Argentina) Carlos Reutemann | Lotus-Ford | 1:45.34 | 3 |
| 4 | 4 | (France) Jean-Pierre Jarier | Tyrrell-Ford | 1:45.36 | 4 |
| 5 | 11 | (South Africa) Jody Scheckter | Ferrari | 1:45.58 | 5 |
| 6 | 7 | (United Kingdom) John Watson | McLaren-Ford | 1:45.76 | 6 |
| 7 | 1 | (United States) Mario Andretti | Lotus-Ford | 1:45.96 | 7 |
| 8 | 3 | (France) Didier Pironi | Tyrrell-Ford | 1:46,43 | 8 |
| 9 | 8 | (France) Patrick Tambay | McLaren-Ford | 1:46.56 | 9 |
| 10 | 12 | (Canada) Gilles Villeneuve | Ferrari | 1:46.88 | 10 |
| 11 | 14 | (Brazil) Emerson Fittipaldi | Fittipaldi-Ford | 1:47.15 | 11 |
| 12 | 15 | (France) Jean-Pierre Jabouille | Renault | 1:47.46 | 12 |
| 13 | 29 | (Italy) Riccardo Patrese | Arrows-Ford | 1:48.33 | DNS |
| 14 | 30 | (West Germany) Jochen Mass | Arrows-Ford | 1:48.34 | 13 |
| 15 | 27 | (Australia) Alan Jones | Williams-Ford | 1:48.44 | 14 |
| 16 | 17 | (Italy) Elio de Angelis | Shadow-Ford | 1:48.51 | 15 |
| 17 | 28 | (Switzerland) Clay Regazzoni | Williams-Ford | 1:48.64 | 16 |
| 18 | 20 | (United Kingdom) James Hunt | Wolf-Ford | 1:48.77 | 17 |
| 19 | 31 | (Mexico) Héctor Rebaque | Lotus-Ford | 1:49.36 | 18 |
| 20 | 6 | (Brazil) Nelson Piquet | Brabham-Alfa Romeo | 1:49.49 | 19 |
| 21 | 18 | (Netherlands) Jan Lammers | Shadow-Ford | 1:49.51 | 20 |
| 22 | 24 | (Italy) Arturo Merzario | Merzario-Ford | 1:50.26 | 21 |
| 23 | 5 | (Austria) Niki Lauda | Brabham-Alfa Romeo | 1:50.29 | 22 |
| 24 | 22 | (Republic of Ireland) Derek Daly | Ensign-Ford | 1:51.05 | 23 |
| 25 | 9 | (West Germany) Hans-Joachim Stuck | ATS-Ford | 1:51.28 | DNS |
| 26 | 16 | (France) René Arnoux | Renault | 1:51.52 | 24 |

=== Race classification ===
| Pos | No | Driver | Constructor | Tyre | Laps | Time/Retired | Grid | Points |
|---|---|---|---|---|---|---|---|---|
| 1 | 26 | (France) Jacques Laffite | Ligier-Ford | G | 53 | 1:36:03.21 | 1 | 9 |
| 2 | 2 | (Argentina) Carlos Reutemann | Lotus-Ford | G | 53 | +14.94 secs | 3 | 6 |
| 3 | 7 | (United Kingdom) John Watson | McLaren-Ford | G | 53 | +1:28.81 | 6 | 4 |
| 4 | 25 | (France) Patrick Depailler | Ligier-Ford | G | 53 | +1:41.72 | 2 | 3 |
| 5 | 1 | (United States) Mario Andretti | Lotus-Ford | G | 52 | +1 Lap | 7 | 2 |
| 6 | 14 | (Brazil) Emerson Fittipaldi | Fittipaldi-Ford | G | 52 | +1 Lap | 11 | 1 |
| 7 | 18 | (Italy) Elio de Angelis | Shadow-Ford | G | 52 | +1 Lap | 16 | |
| 8 | 30 | (West Germany) Jochen Mass | Arrows-Ford | G | 51 | +2 Laps | 14 | |
| 9 | 27 | (Australia) Alan Jones | Williams-Ford | G | 51 | +2 Laps | 15 | |
| 10 | 28 | (Switzerland) Clay Regazzoni | Williams-Ford | G | 51 | +2 Laps | 17 | |
| 11 | 22 | (Republic of Ireland) Derek Daly | Ensign-Ford | G | 51 | +2 Laps | 24 | |
| Ret | 12 | (Canada) Gilles Villeneuve | Ferrari | MI | 48 | Engine | 10 | |
| Ret | 31 | (Mexico) Héctor Rebaque | Lotus-Ford | G | 46 | Suspension | 19 | |
| Ret | 17 | (Netherlands) Jan Lammers | Shadow-Ford | G | 42 | Transmission | 21 | |
| Ret | 20 | (United Kingdom) James Hunt | Wolf-Ford | G | 41 | Electrical | 18 | |
| Ret | 4 | (France) Jean-Pierre Jarier | Tyrrell-Ford | G | 15 | Engine | 4 | |
| Ret | 15 | (France) Jean-Pierre Jabouille | Renault | MI | 15 | Engine | 12 | |
| Ret | 5 | (Austria) Niki Lauda | Brabham-Alfa Romeo | G | 8 | Fuel System | 23 | |
| Ret | 16 | (France) René Arnoux | Renault | MI | 6 | Engine | 26 | |
| Ret | 11 | (South Africa) Jody Scheckter | Ferrari | MI | 0 | Collision | 5 | |
| Ret | 3 | (France) Didier Pironi | Tyrrell-Ford | G | 0 | Collision | 8 | |
| Ret | 8 | (France) Patrick Tambay | McLaren-Ford | G | 0 | Collision | 9 | |
| Ret | 6 | (Brazil) Nelson Piquet | Brabham-Alfa Romeo | G | 0 | Collision | 20 | |
| Ret | 24 | (Italy) Arturo Merzario | Merzario-Ford | G | 0 | Collision | 22 | |
| DNS | 29 | (Italy) Riccardo Patrese | Arrows-Ford | G | 0 | Accident | 13 | |
| DNS | 9 | (West Germany) Hans-Joachim Stuck | ATS-Ford | G | 0 | | 25 | |

== Notes ==
- This was the Formula One World Championship debut for Dutch driver and future Le Mans winner Jan Lammers and Italian driver and future Grand Prix winner Elio de Angelis.
- This was the 1st Grand Slam for Ligier and for a French driver.
- This was the 50th Grand Prix start for Ligier.

== Championship standings after the race ==
Drivers' Championship standings

| Pos | Driver | Points |
|---|---|---|
| 1 | (France) Jacques Laffite | 9 |
| 2 | (Argentina) Carlos Reutemann | 6 |
| 3 | (United Kingdom) John Watson | 4 |
| 4 | (France) Patrick Depailler | 3 |
| 5 | (United States) Mario Andretti | 2 |

Constructors' Championship standings

| Pos | Constructor | Points |
|---|---|---|
| 1 | (France) Ligier-Ford | 12 |
| 2 | (United Kingdom) Lotus-Ford | 8 |
| 3 | (United Kingdom) McLaren-Ford | 4 |
| 4 | (Brazil) Fittipaldi-Ford | 1 |

- Note: Only the top five positions are included for both sets of standings.

| Previous race: 1978 Canadian Grand Prix | FIA Formula One World Championship; 1979 season | Next race: 1979 Brazilian Grand Prix |
| Previous race: 1978 Argentine Grand Prix | Argentine Grand Prix | Next race: 1980 Argentine Grand Prix |
