= 1979 United States Grand Prix West =

- Race 4 of 15 in the 1979 Formula One season
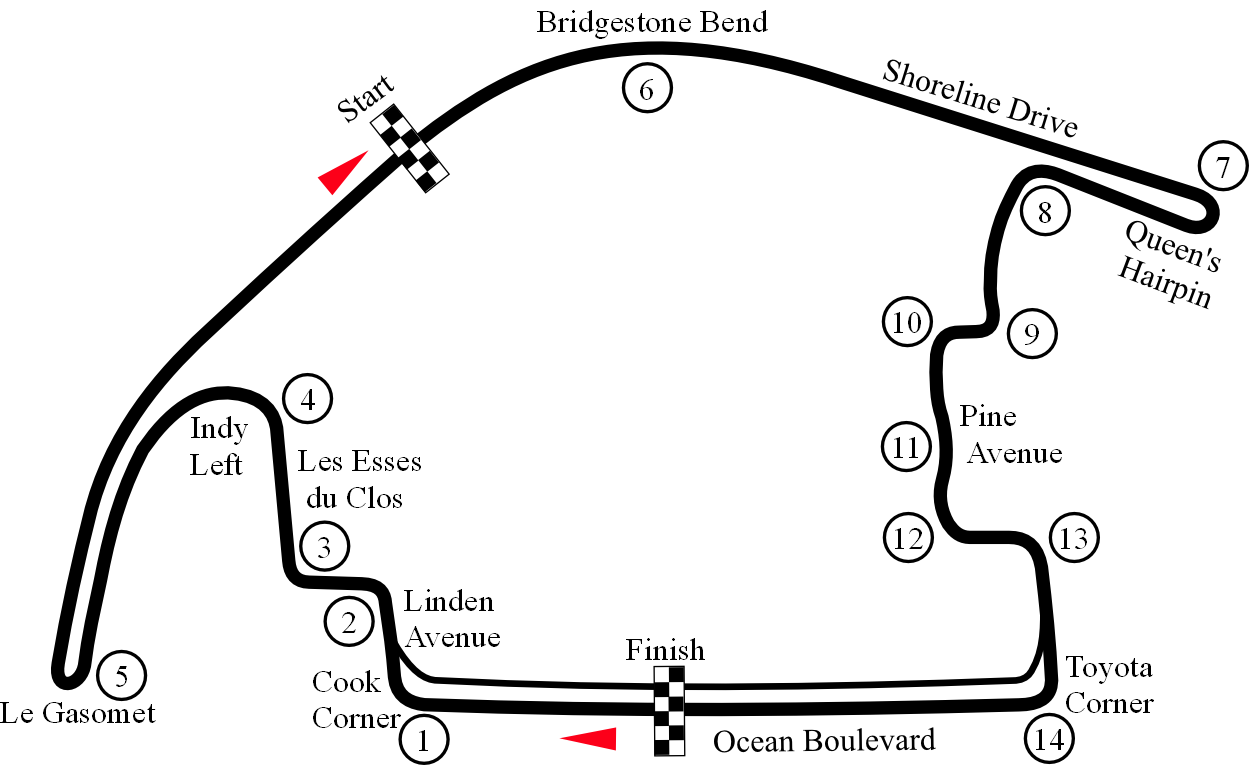

Race details
- Date: April 8, 1979
- Official name: Lubri Lon Long Beach Grand Prix
- Location: Long Beach Street Circuit
- Course: Temporary street course
- Course length: 3.251 km (2.02 miles)
- Distance: 80 laps, 260.08 km (161.60 miles)
- Weather: Sunny and warm with temperatures reaching up to 66 °F (19 °C); winds gusting up to 8 miles per hour (13 km/h)

Pole position
Driver	(Canada) Gilles Villeneuve	Ferrari
- Time: 1:18.825

Fastest lap
Driver	(Canada) Gilles Villeneuve	Ferrari
- Time: 1:21.20

Podium
First	(Canada) Gilles Villeneuve	Ferrari
Second	(South Africa) Jody Scheckter	Ferrari
Third	(Australia) Alan Jones	Williams-Ford

The 1979 United States Grand Prix West, formally titled the Lubri Lon Long Beach Grand Prix, was a Formula One motor race held on April 8, 1979, at Long Beach Street Circuit. Canadian Gilles Villeneuve captured pole, fastest lap and the win for Scuderia Ferrari, followed by his teammate Jody Scheckter, as the Prancing Horses took a big step toward reclaiming the Constructors' and Drivers' Championships from Team Lotus. Villeneuve's win came by almost half a minute over Scheckter, and Alan Jones joined them on the podium for Williams. It was the third win of Villeneuve's career, his second in succession, and the third United States Grand Prix win in a row for Ferrari.

== Summary ==
Qualifying was a battle between Ferrari, Lotus and Ligier, and, as is usually the case at Long Beach, the circuit was littered with broken cars by the end of each session. Carlos Reutemann, in the second Lotus, held the pole until the very end of the final session, when Villeneuve bumped him.

With only Ferrari and Renault on Michelin tires, Villeneuve was able to use seven sets of qualifiers in the final session, while the Goodyear runners had only two sets per car. On his final charge, Villeneuve switched off his rev limiter at the end of the straight, raising the revs by 200 to 12,600 and giving him enough extra speed to pip Reutemann by six hundredths of a second. Scheckter was third, ahead of the two Ligiers of Patrick Depailler and Jacques Laffite, then Mario Andretti in sixth.

On Saturday morning, Jean-Pierre Jabouille had a driveshaft on his Renault break on the curving back straight, flinging him into the wall at 180 mph. A badly sprained arm would keep him out of the race. Then, in the Sunday morning warmup, a stronger version of the driveshaft, produced by the team in the garage, broke on teammate René Arnoux's car. Rather than taking a chance on duplicating Jabouille's incident, the team withdrew their remaining car from the race, allowing Derek Daly's Ensign onto the starting grid.

100,000 fans gathered on Sunday, which turned sunny and warm just in time for the race. As with the previous year, the start would be on the Shoreline Drive straight, rather than in front of the pits, giving the drivers more of a run down to the first corner. On the warmup lap preceding the drive around to the grid, Reutemann's engine cut out, and he had to be helped back to the pits. The problem was quickly solved, and, while the organizers ruled that he must start from the back of the grid, Reutemann ignored the officials and went back out.

The cars made their way around for the start on Shoreline Drive, and as they approached the grid markings, pole-sitter Villeneuve drove past his starting position. This confused the entire field, who were taking their cue from Villeneuve. Some actually thought the race had started, and everyone ended up back at the pits. On the way to the grid, Laffite's Ligier had suddenly slid across the track when car's rear end seized. He was allowed to switch to his spare car and start the race from the pits with Reutemann. Villeneuve could have been penalized for missing his start position and botching the race start, but was not. A bemused James Hunt was interviewed by American television and offered his opinion on the favoritism he felt was consistently shown to the Ferrari team.

When the race finally started, Villeneuve led the field into the Queen's Hairpin. At the end of one full lap, Villeneuve led Depailler, Scheckter, Jean-Pierre Jarier, Andretti, Riccardo Patrese, Jones and Nelson Piquet. Villeneuve got to the first corner ahead of Scheckter and quickly began to draw away. Scheckter lost a position to Depailler on the first half lap, but began pushing hard to take back second place. When Depailler missed a gear, Scheckter nearly hit him in the back, and Jarier slipped his Tyrrell past both of them. On the next lap, Scheckter also got around Depailler, whose troubles with fourth gear would last the entire race.

Villeneuve continued to run untroubled in the lead, expanding his margin whenever he chose and setting the race's fastest lap before half-distance. The battle for second, however, was fierce as Jarier, Scheckter, Depailler, Andretti and Jones formed a massive train. Jarier was fighting a wheel vibration and holding everyone up, but no one could pass him on the straight.

On lap 28, Scheckter got by the struggling Tyrrell, but it was not until laps 45 and 46, respectively, that Depailler and Jones could follow. By that time, Scheckter had a cushion of nearly twenty seconds back to Depailler in third. With the Ligier still struggling, Jones moved into third place on lap 63. This left Andretti behind Depailler and the two traded positions several times, the Lotus able to go through in the curvy sections, while the Ligier continually repassed on the straight. Finally, as Depailler attempted to lap Jarier, now in sixth spot, he bent his front wing against Jarier's wheel, and Andretti was able to take hold of fourth place for good.

Depailler's persistence was rewarded with a hard-earned fifth place, and Jarier inherited sixth when Héctor Rebaque, having come from twenty-third to the points, collided with Daly while trying to lap him in the esses.

It was the second win of the season for Villeneuve and put him on top of the Driver's standings.

== Classification ==
=== Qualifying ===
Pos.	No.	Driver	Constructor	Q1	Q2	Gap
1	12	(Canada) Gilles Villeneuve	Ferrari	1:20.186	1:18.825	—
2	2	(Argentina) Carlos Reutemann	Lotus-Ford	1:20.126	1:18.886	+0.041
3	11	(South Africa) Jody Scheckter	Ferrari	1:20.291	1:18.911	+0.086
4	25	(France) Patrick Depailler	Ligier-Ford	1:20.867	1:19.025	+0.200
5	26	(France) Jacques Laffite	Ligier-Ford	1:20.225	1:19.032	+0.207
6	1	(United States) Mario Andretti	Lotus-Ford	1:20.574	1:19.454	+0.629
7	4	(France) Jean-Pierre Jarier	Tyrrell-Ford	1:20.916	1:19.580	+0.755
8	20	(United Kingdom) James Hunt	Wolf-Ford	1:20.913	1:19.643	+0.818
9	29	(Italy) Riccardo Patrese	Arrows-Ford	1:21.831	1:19.727	+0.902
10	27	(Australia) Alan Jones	Williams-Ford	1:22.532	1:19.910	+1.085
11	5	(Austria) Niki Lauda	Brabham-Alfa Romeo	1:21.436	1:20.041	+1.216
12	6	(Brazil) Nelson Piquet	Brabham-Alfa Romeo	1:21.565	1:20.456	+1.631
13	30	(West Germany) Jochen Mass	Arrows-Ford	1:22.350	1:20.608	+1.783
14	17	(Netherlands) Jan Lammers	Shadow-Ford	1:23.161	1:20.740	+1.915
15	28	(Switzerland) Clay Regazzoni	Williams-Ford	1:21.767	1:20.768	+1.943
16	14	(Brazil) Emerson Fittipaldi	Fittipaldi-Ford	1:22.498	1:21.033	+2.208
17	3	(France) Didier Pironi	Tyrrell-Ford	1:22.000	1:21.192	+2.367
18	7	(United Kingdom) John Watson	McLaren-Ford	1:23.725	1:21.304	+2.479
19	8	(France) Patrick Tambay	McLaren-Ford	1:22.569	1:21.411	+2.586
20	15	(France) Jean-Pierre Jabouille	Renault	1:21.635	-	+2.810
21	18	(Italy) Elio de Angelis	Shadow-Ford	1:23.433	1:21.961	+3.136
22	16	(France) René Arnoux	Renault	1:22.088	-	+3.263
23	9	(West Germany) Hans-Joachim Stuck	ATS-Ford	1:23.724	1:22.828	+4.003
24	24	(Italy) Arturo Merzario	Merzario-Ford	-	1:22.938	+4.113
25	31	(Mexico) Héctor Rebaque	Lotus-Ford	1:24.808	1:22.990	+4.165
26	22	(Republic of Ireland) Derek Daly	Ensign-Ford	1:25.076	1:23.888	+5.063

=== Race ===
Pos	No	Driver	Constructor	Laps	Time/Retired	Grid	Points
1	12	(Canada) Gilles Villeneuve	Ferrari	80	1:50:25.40	1	9
2	11	(South Africa) Jody Scheckter	Ferrari	80	+29.38	3	6
3	27	(Australia) Alan Jones	Williams-Ford	80	+59.69	10	4
4	1	(United States) Mario Andretti	Lotus-Ford	80	+1:04.33	6	3
5	25	(France) Patrick Depailler	Ligier-Ford	80	+1:23.52	4	2
6	4	(France) Jean-Pierre Jarier	Tyrrell-Ford	79	+1 lap	7	1
7	18	(Italy) Elio de Angelis	Shadow-Ford	78	+2 laps	20	
8	6	(Brazil) Nelson Piquet	Brabham-Alfa Romeo	78	+2 laps	12	
9	30	(West Germany) Jochen Mass	Arrows-Ford	78	+2 laps	13	
DSQ	3	(France) Didier Pironi	Tyrrell-Ford	72	Push start	17	
Ret	31	(Mexico) Héctor Rebaque	Lotus-Ford	71	Accident	23	
Ret	22	(Republic of Ireland) Derek Daly	Ensign-Ford	69	Accident	24	
Ret	7	(United Kingdom) John Watson	McLaren-Ford	62	Injection	18	
DSQ	9	(West Germany) Hans-Joachim Stuck	ATS-Ford	49	Push start	21	
Ret	28	(Switzerland) Clay Regazzoni	Williams-Ford	48	Engine	15	
Ret	17	(Netherlands) Jan Lammers	Shadow-Ford	47	Suspension	14	
Ret	29	(Italy) Riccardo Patrese	Arrows-Ford	40	Brakes	9	
Ret	2	(Argentina) Carlos Reutemann	Lotus-Ford	21	Transmission	2	
Ret	14	(Brazil) Emerson Fittipaldi	Fittipaldi-Ford	19	Transmission	16	
Ret	24	(Italy) Arturo Merzario	Merzario-Ford	13	Engine	22	
Ret	26	(France) Jacques Laffite	Ligier-Ford	8	Brakes	5	
Ret	20	(United Kingdom) James Hunt	Wolf-Ford	0	Transmission	8	
Ret	5	(Austria) Niki Lauda	Brabham-Alfa Romeo	0	Accident	11	
Ret	8	(France) Patrick Tambay	McLaren-Ford	0	Collision	19	
WD	16	(France) René Arnoux	Renault		Withdrawn		
DNS	15	(France) Jean-Pierre Jabouille	Renault		Injury in practice		

== Notes ==
- This was the 1st pole position set by and first Grand Slam for a Canadian driver.
- This was the 10th Grand Prix start for Italian constructor Merzario.
- This race marked the 88th pole position for Ferrari. It broke the previous record set by Lotus at the 1978 Canadian Grand Prix.

== Championship standings after the race ==
Drivers' Championship standings

	Pos	Driver	Points
2	1	(Canada) Gilles Villeneuve	20
1	2	(France) Jacques Laffite	18
2	3	(South Africa) Jody Scheckter	13
2	4	(Argentina) Carlos Reutemann	12
1	5	(France) Patrick Depailler	11

Constructors' Championship standings

	Pos	Constructor	Points
1	1	(Italy) Ferrari	33
1	2	(France) Ligier-Ford	29
	3	(United Kingdom) Lotus-Ford	20
	4	(United Kingdom) Tyrrell-Ford	8
	5	(United Kingdom) McLaren-Ford	4

- Note: Only the top five positions are included for both sets of standings.

Previous race: 1979 South African Grand Prix	FIA Formula One World Championship; 1979 season	Next race: 1979 Spanish Grand Prix
Previous race: 1978 United States Grand Prix West	United States Grand Prix West	Next race: 1980 United States Grand Prix West

Preceded by 1978 United States Grand Prix West	Grand Prix of Long Beach	Succeeded by 1980 United States Grand Prix West
