= 1979 South African Grand Prix =

- Race 3 of 15 in the 1979 Formula One season
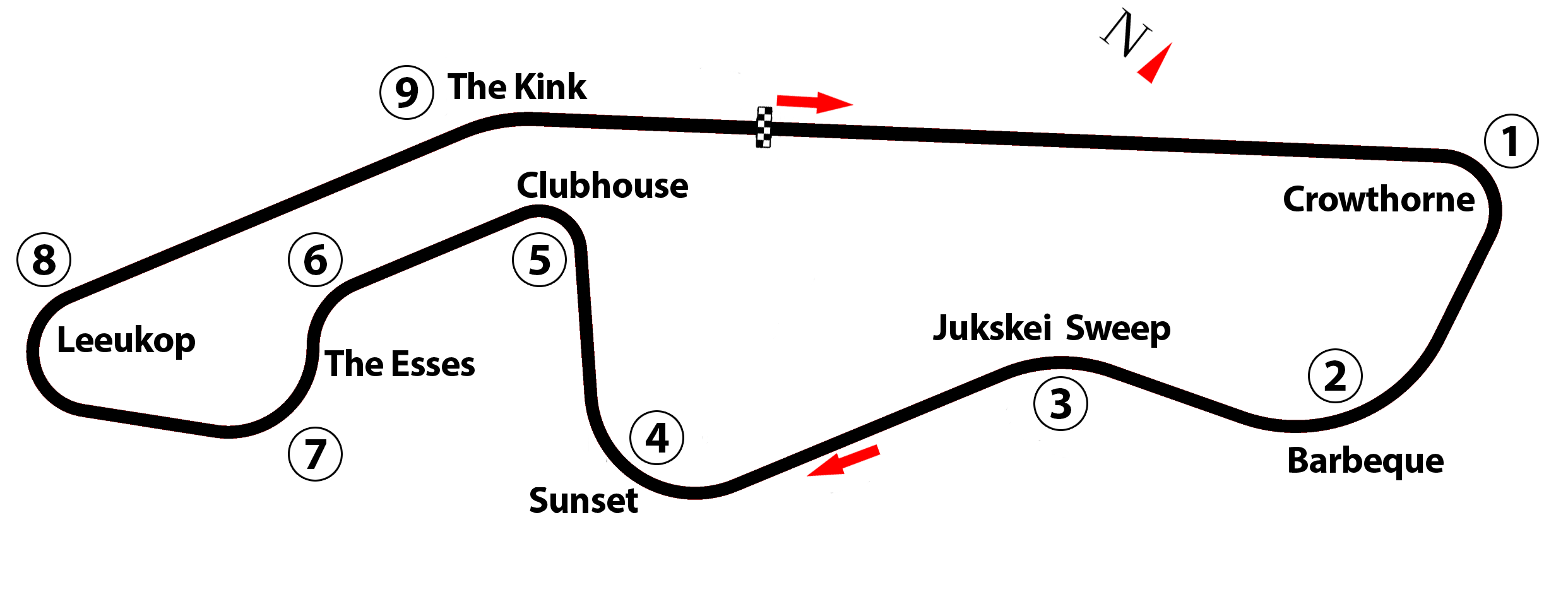

Race details
- Date: 3 March 1979
- Official name: XXV Simba Grand Prix of South Africa
- Location: Kyalami; Transvaal Province, South Africa
- Course: Permanent racing facility
- Course length: 4.104 km (2.550 miles)
- Distance: 78 laps, 320.112 km (198.908 miles)
- Weather: Wet

Pole position
Driver	(France) Jean-Pierre Jabouille	Renault
- Time: 1:11.80

Fastest lap
Driver	(Canada) Gilles Villeneuve	Ferrari
- Time: 1:14.412 on lap 23

Podium
First	(Canada) Gilles Villeneuve	Ferrari
Second	(South Africa) Jody Scheckter	Ferrari
Third	(France) Jean-Pierre Jarier	Tyrrell-Ford

The 1979 South African Grand Prix (formally the XXV Simba Grand Prix of South Africa) was a Formula One motor race held on 3 March 1979 at Kyalami. The race, contested over 78 laps, was the third race of the 1979 Formula One season and was won by Gilles Villeneuve, driving a Ferrari. Teammate and local driver Jody Scheckter finished second, while Jean-Pierre Jarier finished third in a Tyrrell-Ford.

== Qualifying ==
=== Qualifying classification ===
Pos.	No.	Driver	Constructor	Time	Grid
1	15	(France) Jean-Pierre Jabouille	Renault	1:11,80	1
2	11	(South Africa) Jody Scheckter	Ferrari	1:12.04	2
3	12	(Canada) Gilles Villeneuve	Ferrari	1:12.07	3
4	5	(Austria) Niki Lauda	Brabham-Alfa Romeo	1:12.12	4
5	25	(France) Patrick Depailler	Ligier-Ford	1:12.15	5
6	26	(France) Jacques Laffite	Ligier-Ford	1:12.26	6
7	3	(France) Didier Pironi	Tyrrell-Ford	1:12,33	7
8	1	(United States) Mario Andretti	Lotus-Ford	1:12,36	8
9	4	(France) Jean-Pierre Jarier	Tyrrell-Ford	1:12,55	9
10	16	(France) René Arnoux	Renault	1:12,69	10
11	2	(Argentina) Carlos Reutemann	Lotus-Ford	1:12,75	11
12	6	(Brazil) Nelson Piquet	Brabham-Alfa Romeo	1:13,07	12
13	20	(United Kingdom) James Hunt	Wolf-Ford	1:14,21	13
14	7	(United Kingdom) John Watson	McLaren-Ford	1:14,44	14
15	17	(Italy) Elio de Angelis	Shadow-Ford	1:14,44	15
16	29	(Italy) Riccardo Patrese	Arrows-Ford	1:14,54	16
17	8	(France) Patrick Tambay	McLaren-Ford	1:14,58	17
18	14	(Brazil) Emerson Fittipaldi	Fittipaldi-Ford	1:14,61	18
19	27	(Australia) Alan Jones	Williams-Ford	1:14,64	19
20	30	(West Germany) Jochen Mass	Arrows-Ford	1:15,00	20
21	18	(Netherlands) Jan Lammers	Shadow-Ford	1:15,35	21
22	28	(Switzerland) Clay Regazzoni	Williams-Ford	1:15,68	22
23	31	(Mexico) Héctor Rebaque	Lotus-Ford	1:16,15	23
24	9	(West Germany) Hans-Joachim Stuck	ATS-Ford	1:16.31	24
DNQ	22	(Republic of Ireland) Derek Daly	Ensign-Ford	1:16.64	—
DNQ	24	(Italy) Arturo Merzario	Merzario-Ford	1:18.14	—

== Race ==
=== Classification ===
Pos	No	Driver	Constructor	Tyre	Laps	Time/Retired	Grid	Points
1	12	(Canada) Gilles Villeneuve	Ferrari	MI	78	1:41:49.96	3	9
2	11	(South Africa) Jody Scheckter	Ferrari	MI	78	+ 3.42	2	6
3	4	(France) Jean-Pierre Jarier	Tyrrell-Ford	G	78	+ 22.11	9	4
4	1	(United States) Mario Andretti	Lotus-Ford	G	78	+ 27.88	8	3
5	2	(Argentina) Carlos Reutemann	Lotus-Ford	G	78	+ 1:06.97	11	2
6	5	(Austria) Niki Lauda	Brabham-Alfa Romeo	G	77	+ 1 Lap	4	1
7	6	(Brazil) Nelson Piquet	Brabham-Alfa Romeo	G	77	+ 1 Lap	12	
8	20	(United Kingdom) James Hunt	Wolf-Ford	G	77	+ 1 Lap	13	
9	28	(Switzerland) Clay Regazzoni	Williams-Ford	G	76	+ 2 Laps	22	
10	8	(France) Patrick Tambay	McLaren-Ford	G	75	+ 3 Laps	17	
11	29	(Italy) Riccardo Patrese	Arrows-Ford	G	75	+ 3 Laps	16	
12	30	(West Germany) Jochen Mass	Arrows-Ford	G	74	+ 4 Laps	20	
13	14	(Brazil) Emerson Fittipaldi	Fittipaldi-Ford	G	74	+ 4 Laps	18	
Ret	31	(Mexico) Héctor Rebaque	Lotus-Ford	G	71	Engine	23	
Ret	16	(France) René Arnoux	Renault	MI	67	Tyre	10	
Ret	27	(Australia) Alan Jones	Williams-Ford	G	63	Suspension	19	
Ret	7	(United Kingdom) John Watson	McLaren-Ford	G	61	Ignition	14	
Ret	9	(West Germany) Hans-Joachim Stuck	ATS-Ford	G	57	Accident	24	
Ret	15	(France) Jean-Pierre Jabouille	Renault	MI	47	Engine	1	
Ret	26	(France) Jacques Laffite	Ligier-Ford	G	45	Accident	6	
Ret	3	(France) Didier Pironi	Tyrrell-Ford	G	25	Throttle	7	
Ret	18	(Italy) Elio de Angelis	Shadow-Ford	G	16	Accident	15	
Ret	25	(France) Patrick Depailler	Ligier-Ford	G	4	Accident	5	
Ret	17	(Netherlands) Jan Lammers	Shadow-Ford	G	2	Accident	21	
DNQ	22	(Republic of Ireland) Derek Daly	Ensign-Ford	G				
DNQ	24	(Italy) Arturo Merzario	Merzario-Ford	G				

== Notes ==
- This was the first pole position set by Renault and a Renault-powered car.

== Championship standings after the race ==
Drivers' Championship standings

	Pos	Driver	Points
	1	(France) Jacques Laffite	18
	2	(Argentina) Carlos Reutemann	12
4	3	(Canada) Gilles Villeneuve	11
1	4	(France) Patrick Depailler	9
3	5	(South Africa) Jody Scheckter	7

Constructors' Championship standings

	Pos	Constructor	Points
	1	(France) Ligier-Ford	27
3	2	(Italy) Ferrari	18
1	3	(United Kingdom) Lotus-Ford	17
	4	(United Kingdom) Tyrrell-Ford	7
2	5	(United Kingdom) McLaren-Ford	4

- Note: Only the top five positions are included for both sets of standings.

Previous race: 1979 Brazilian Grand Prix	FIA Formula One World Championship; 1979 season	Next race: 1979 United States Grand Prix West
Previous race: 1978 South African Grand Prix	South African Grand Prix	Next race: 1980 South African Grand Prix
