= Reviglio =

Reviglio is a surname. Notable people with the surname include:

- Franco Reviglio (1935–2025), Italian academic, businessman and socialist politician
- Víctor Reviglio (born 1938), Argentine politician and diplomat
