= Carlos Reutemann =

Argentine racing driver and politician (1942–2021)

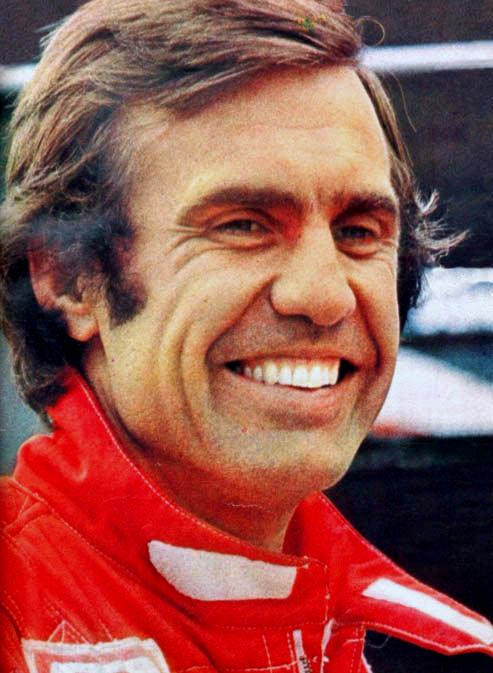
- Reutemann at the 1981 Italian Grand Prix

Governor of Santa Fe
- In office 10 December 1999 – 10 December 2003
- Vice Governor: Marcelo Muniagurria
- Preceded by: Jorge Obeid
- Succeeded by: Jorge Obeid
- In office 10 December 1991 – 10 December 1995
- Vice Governor: Miguel Angel Robles
- Preceded by: Víctor Reviglio
- Succeeded by: Jorge Obeid

National Senator for Santa Fe
- In office 10 December 2003 – 7 July 2021
- Preceded by: Oscar Lambert
- Succeeded by: Alexandra Vucasovich
- In office 10 December 1995 – 10 December 1999
- Preceded by: Louis Rubeo
- Succeeded by: Arturo Rolando di Pietro

Personal details
- Born: Carlos Alberto Reutemann; 12 April 1942 Santa Fe, Argentina
- Died: 7 July 2021 (aged 79) Santa Fe, Argentina
- Party: Justicialist Party
- Other political affiliations: Cambiemos (2015–2019)
- Spouses: Mimicha Bobbio (m. 1968; div. 1980) Verónica Ghio (m. 2006)
- Children: 2
- Occupation: Racing driver; politician

Formula One World Championship career
- Active years: 1972–1982
- Team(s): Brabham, Ferrari, Lotus, Williams
- Entries: 146
- Championships: 0
- Wins: 12
- Podiums: 45
- Career points: 298 (310) (Note: Up until 1990, not all points scored by a driver contributed to their final World Championship tally (see list of points scoring systems for more information). Numbers without parentheses are Championship points; numbers in parentheses are total points scored.)
- Pole positions: 6
- Fastest laps: 6
- First entry: 1972 Argentine Grand Prix
- First win: 1974 South African Grand Prix
- Last win: 1981 Belgian Grand Prix
- Last entry: 1982 Brazilian Grand Prix

World Rally Championship record
- Years active: 1980, 1985
- Co-driver: (Italy) Mirko Perissutti (France) Jean-François Fauchille
- Teams: Fiat, Peugeot
- Rallies: 2
- Championships: 0
- Rally wins: 0
- Podiums: 2
- Stage wins: 1
- Total points: 24
- First rally: 1980 Rally Argentina
- Last rally: 1985 Rally Argentina

Carlos Alberto "Lole" Reutemann (12 April 1942 – 7 July 2021) was an Argentine racing driver and politician, who competed in Formula One from 1972 to 1982 and served as the Governor of Santa Fe from 1999 to 2003. Reutemann was runner-up in the Formula One World Drivers' Championship in 1981 with Williams and—at the time of his retirement—held the record for most podium finishes (45); he won 12 Grands Prix across 11 seasons. A member of the Justicialist Party, he was a National Senator for Santa Fe from 2003 until his death in 2021.

As a racing driver, Reutemann was among Formula One's leading protagonists between 1972 and 1982. He scored 12 Grand Prix wins and six pole positions. In 1981 while driving for Williams he finished second in the World Drivers' Championship by one point, having been overtaken in the last race of the season. Reutemann also finished in third overall three times for three separate teams, 1975 for Brabham, 1978 for Ferrari, and 1980 for Williams. To date, he is the last Argentine driver to win a Grand Prix.

In terms of race wins, Reutemann's final Ferrari season in 1978 was his most successful with four wins, but he fell short to the consistency of the Lotus team with Mario Andretti and Ronnie Peterson and was not in championship contention to the final race. He finished third, just behind Peterson, who had died in an accident at Monza earlier that autumn. In 1981, Reutemann instead relied on consistency, but narrowly lost out to Nelson Piquet for the title. He became the second Formula One driver after Leo Kinnunen to be at the podium of a World Rally Championship event, when he finished third in the 1980 and 1985 editions of Rally Argentina. He was also for three decades the only Formula One driver to score drivers' championship points in both F1 and WRC, until Kimi Räikkönen's eighth place at the 2010 Jordan Rally.

As a popular governor and a senator, Reutemann was considered by some, on several occasions, to be a worthy candidate for president of Argentina. While he considered running for president in the 2011 Argentine general election, he ultimately declined to do so. Reutemann died in a medical facility in Santa Fe, Argentina, on 7 July 2021 after suffering from issues relating to a haemorrhage as well as other health issues.

== Racing career ==
=== Early years ===
Descended from a Swiss-German grandfather, an Argentine father and an Italian mother, Reutemann was the first successful Argentine Formula One driver to come along since the retirement of five-time World Champion Juan Manuel Fangio in 1958. He first raced in 1965 in a Fiat saloon car. After racing touring cars and Formula 2 in Argentina, he moved to Europe in 1970 to drive a Brabham for the Automobile Club of Argentina Team in the European Formula 2 series. He immediately received attention when he took out Austrian Formula One driver Jochen Rindt (that year's eventual posthumous World Champion) on the first lap of his first race at Hockenheim, but carried on to finish fourth. The next season, he finished a close second in the series to Sweden's Ronnie Peterson.

=== Formula One: early years ===
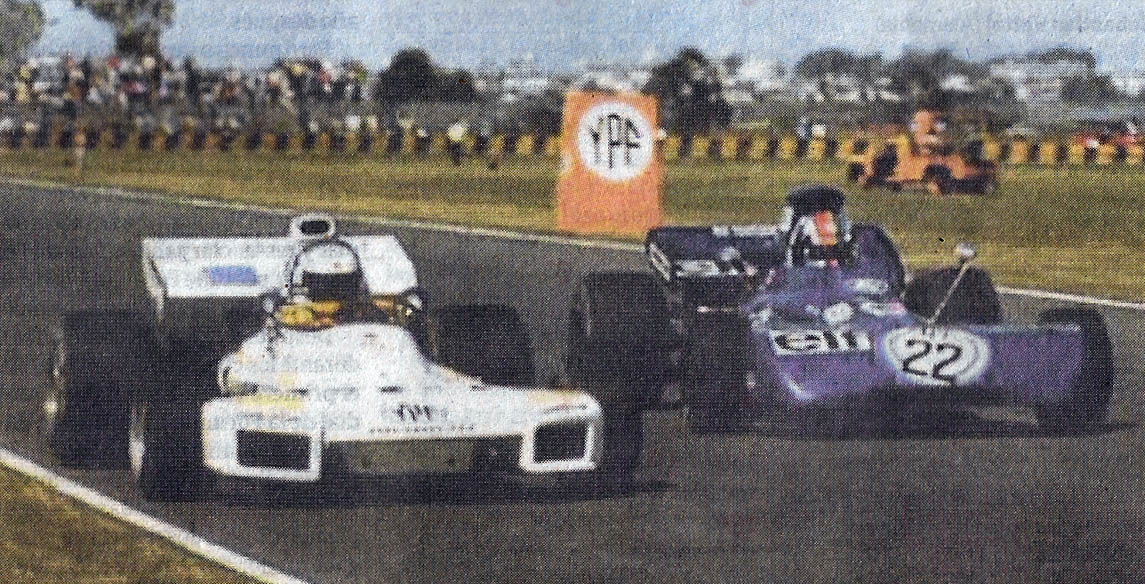
Reutemann's (left) debut in Formula One, the 1972 Argentine Grand Prix in Buenos Aires

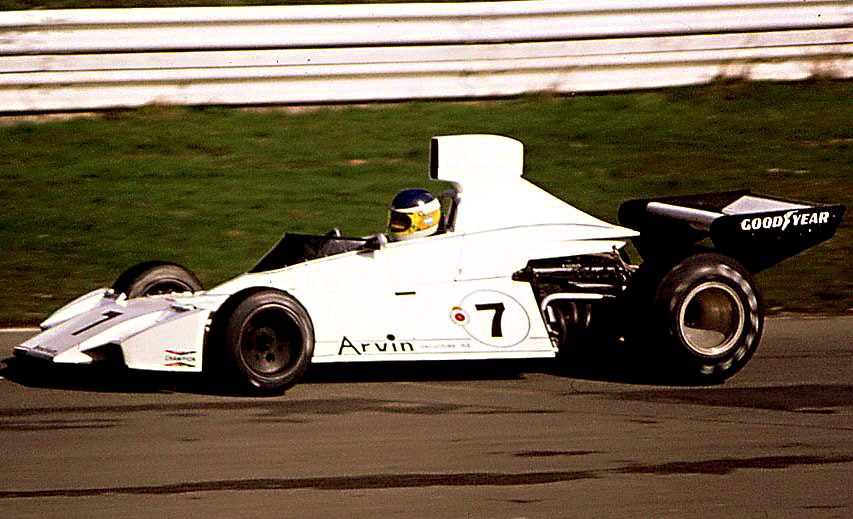
Reutemann at the wheel of the Brabham BT44 during the 1974 Race of Champions at Brands Hatch, England

Brabham F1 team boss Bernie Ecclestone signed Reutemann to drive alongside veteran and two-time World Champion Graham Hill for the 1972 season. At the first race, in front of his home crowd at Buenos Aires for his first Grand Prix, Reutemann qualified his Brabham BT34 on pole position. This was a feat previously performed only by Mario Andretti, and since matched only by Jacques Villeneuve; his teammate Hill qualified 16th. He finished the race in seventh after having to pit to replace his soft tyres, and the main highlight for the rest of the year was his win in the non-championship Interlagos Grand Prix.

Teamed with Brazilian Wilson Fittipaldi Júnior for the 1973 season, Reutemann scored two podium finishes and seventh in the Drivers' Championship in the tiny but radical Gordon Murray-designed BT42. For 1974, Murray designed the BT44, which was a further improvement and the team finished a close fifth in the Constructors' Championship. Reutemann, who very much liked the BT44 took the first three victories of his F1 career at South Africa, Austria, and the United States. He might have won the first race of the year in Argentina, too, but the Brabham team apparently failed to properly fuel his car and he ran out of fuel with less than two laps to go while safely in the lead. Though he matched Drivers' Champion Emerson Fittipaldi's win total, inconsistent performances in the other races left Reutemann sixth in the season standings.

Five podium finishes in 1975, including a win in Germany at the old 14-mile Nürburgring allowed Reutemann to place third in that year's championship. The Brabham team switched to the Alfa Romeo flat-12 engine for 1976 and suffered from serious reliability problems. After seven retirements and only one finish in the points (fourth place in Spain) in the first twelve races, Reutemann negotiated a release from his Brabham contract to sign with Ferrari, who was looking for a temporary replacement for the injured Niki Lauda. Lauda's unexpected speedy recovery resulted in Reutemann racing only once for the team, in a third car at Monza, and then sitting out for the final three races.

For the 1977 season, Ferrari opted to keep the now fully recovered Lauda and have Reutemann replacing Clay Regazzoni, who moved on to the Ensign team. In the first two races, Reutemann finished third in Argentina and won in Brazil, outdriving Lauda in both events and taking the championship lead. For the Brazilian race, Ferrari had just designed a new rear wing that was put on Reutemann's car and not Lauda's, so Reutemann went into this Brazilian GP with a performance advantage and a psychological high- the psychological aspect being crucial to how Reutemann would perform in the race. Reutemann would later state in an interview that this was his best race. Over the course of the season, however, Lauda reaffirmed his position as team leader, and the Austrian won his second championship, while Reutemann finished fourth and did not win another race that year. Reutemann also did not have a good relationship with Ferrari chief engineer Mauro Forghieri, who was weary, distrustful of and often frustrated by Reutemann and his temperament, even though Reutemann consistently finished races in the points and rarely ever retired (although difficult to drive, the 1977 B-spec. Ferrari 312T2 was a very reliable car).

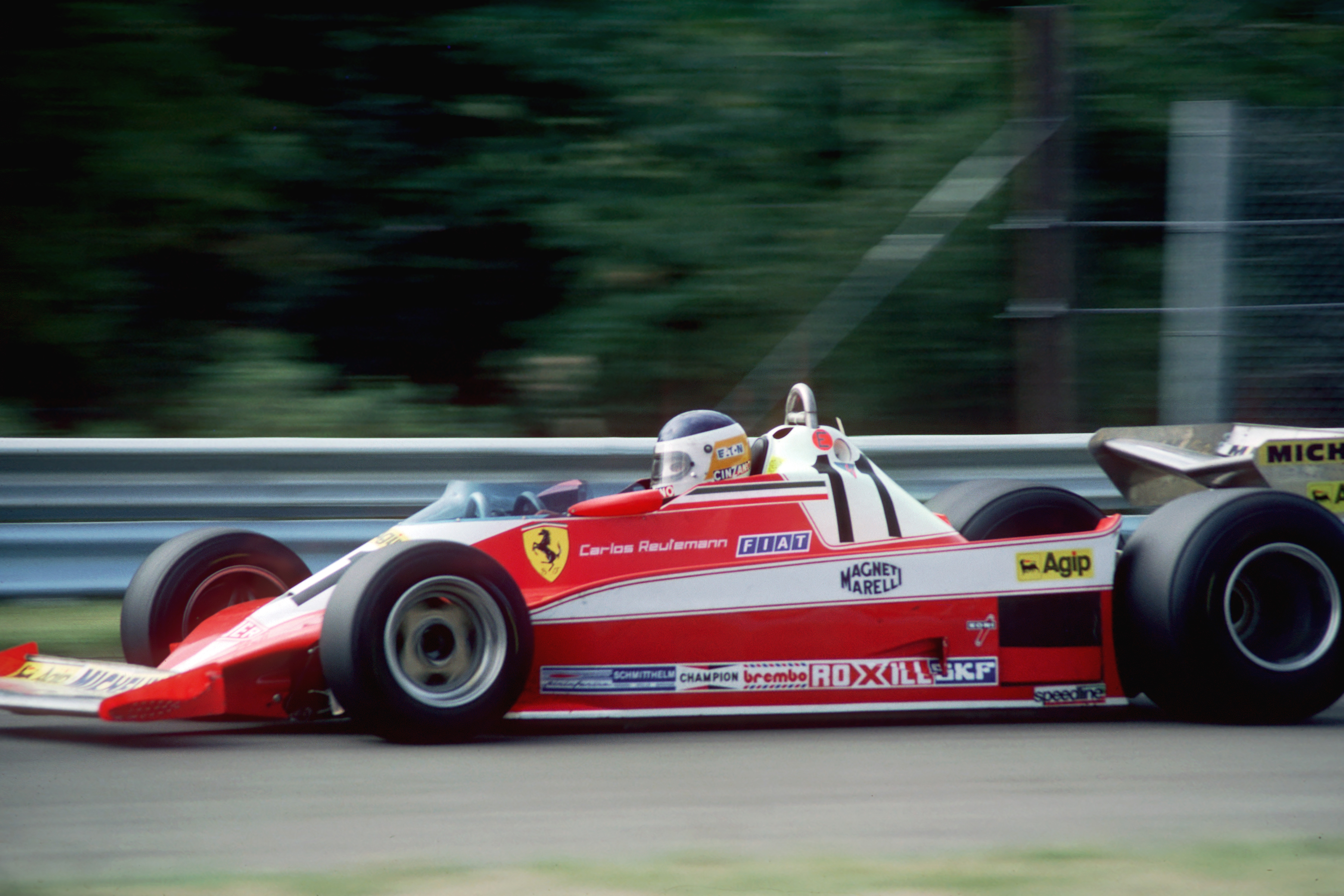
Reutemann driving his Ferrari 312T3 to victory at the 1978 USA Grand Prix at Watkins Glen, New York

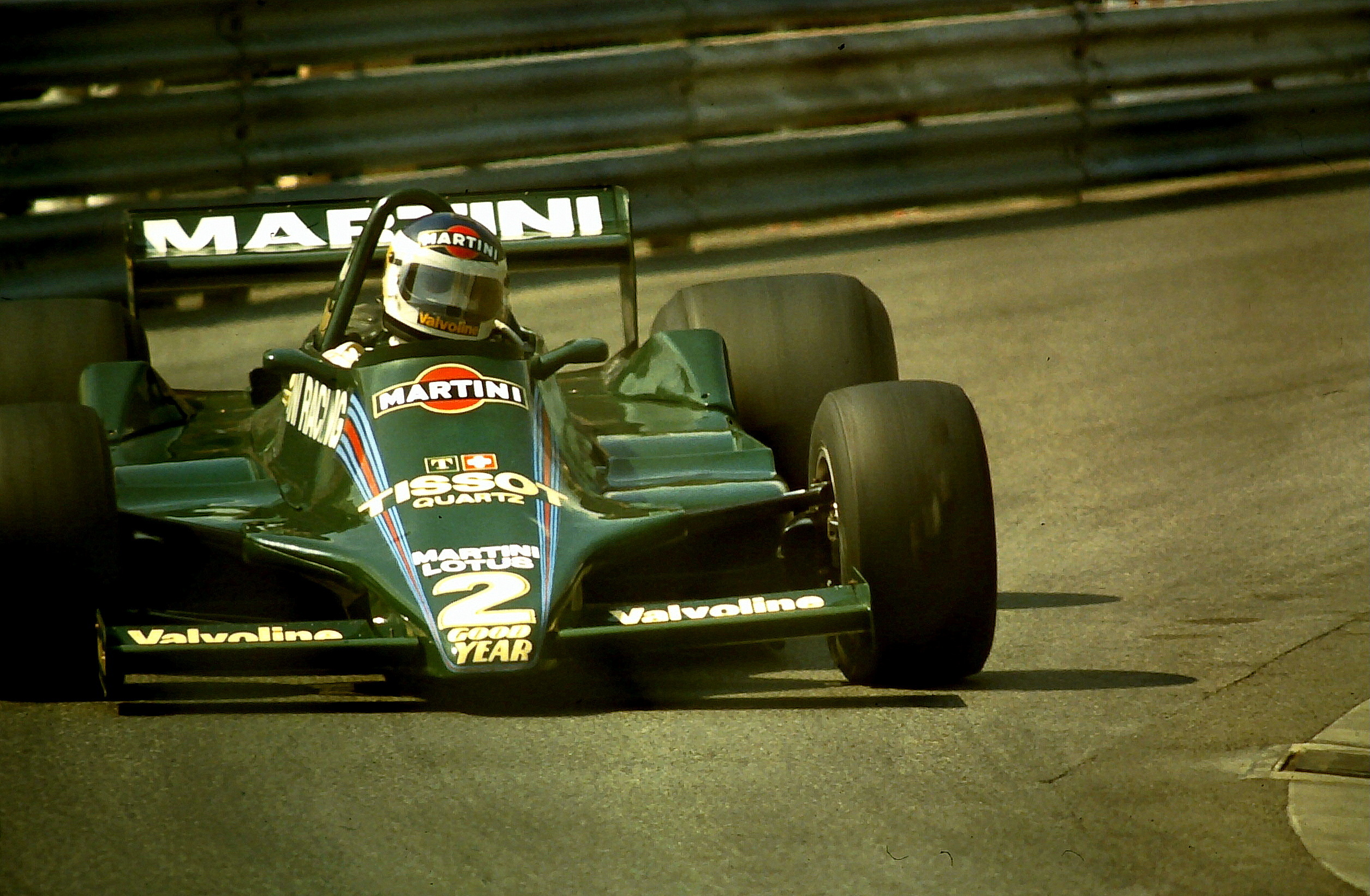
Reutemann driving the Lotus 79 at the 1979 Monaco Grand Prix

When Lauda moved to Brabham in 1978, Reutemann became the senior member of the Ferrari team, joined by the young Canadian Gilles Villeneuve. Reutemann used the 312T2B to win in Brazil, and a 312T3 to win in Britain and twice in the United States (Long Beach and Watkins Glen). Reutemann's win in Britain at Brands Hatch was particularly memorable as he took advantage of Lauda being held up by backmarker Bruno Giacomelli, and Reutemann passed a beleaguered Lauda for the lead at Clearways. However, the Lotus team was dominant once their new 79 was introduced at Monaco, and Reutemann finished a close third in the points standings behind Andretti and Peterson. Reutemann also had a huge accident at the Spanish Grand Prix after a tyre failure and a collision with Jacques Laffite sent his Ferrari into the air, clearing the Armco barrier and landing in the debris fencing.

With an opening at Lotus in 1979 after the death of Ronnie Peterson, Reutemann decided to move from Ferrari to Lotus. The first few races went well for him – highlights being forceful second places in Argentina and Spain, plus third places at Brazil and Monaco – but, as the season wore on, the team struggled while Jody Scheckter won the title for Ferrari. After four podiums and six points finishes in the first seven races, Reutemann ended up finishing in only seventh place for the season. Reutemann leaving Ferrari for Lotus for the 1979 season was poorly timed because with the introduction of the model 312T4, Ferrari was able to make a big comeback and place its drivers in 1st and 2nd place in the final standings of the season.

=== Career at Williams ===
Joining the Williams team for 1980 put him back in a competitive car once again- the very quick FW07. The season started off badly for the patriotic Argentine, he failed to win his home Grand Prix in Buenos Aires (which was the first race of the season; this was a feat he would never accomplish) after his car suffered engine failure. Reutemann got out of the car, took off his helmet, sat down next to his car, and burst into tears in full view of cameras broadcasting the race worldwide and in front of the 80,000 spectators at the track. However, the season got much better as he would win at Monaco and score eight podiums throughout the year to finish third in the championship. His partnership with number one driver and World Champion Alan Jones was productive for Williams, who won their first Constructors' Championship with a then-record 120 points.

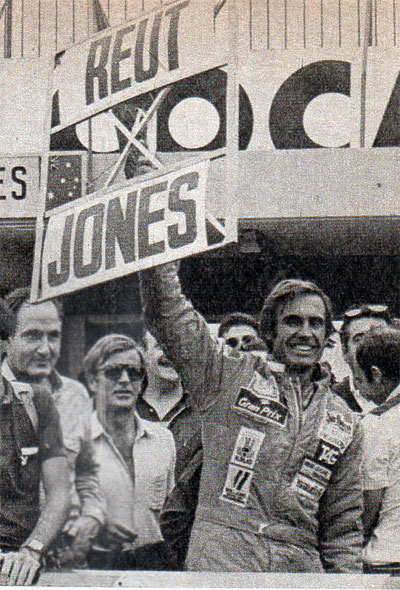
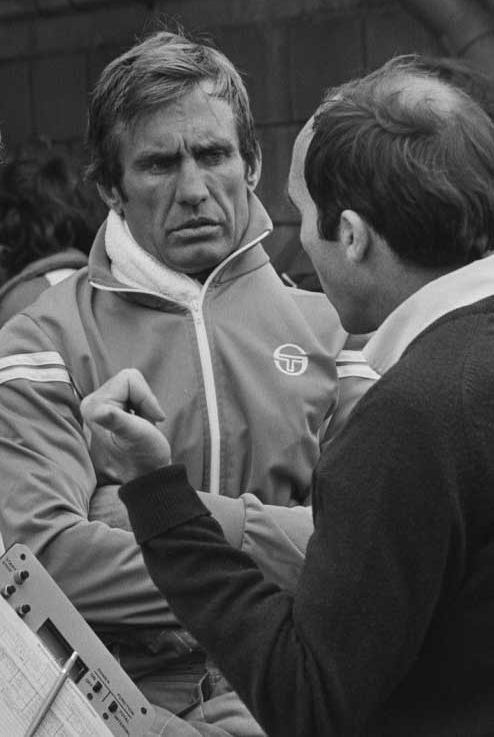
Two moments of Reutemann during the 1981 F1 season: (left): holding the "Reut-Jones" sign at the Argentine Grand Prix; (right): with Frank Williams at the Dutch Grand Prix

Reutemann's relationship with his teammate soured when, the following season, Reutemann disobeyed the team's orders and thereby refused to allow Jones to win in Brazil. Jones never forgave this act of disobedience on the part of his teammate, while Reutemann felt frustrated at Jones' refusal to acknowledge his help, especially after having just given him the victory at the Long Beach. Reutemann continued to score more points than Jones throughout the remainder of the season, and the Brazilian victory (and another in Belgium) helped put him in a position to challenge for the title in a three-way battle with Nelson Piquet and Jacques Laffite at the season-ending race in Las Vegas. In what was probably a defining moment of the season, Reutemann was ordered in Germany to turn over his race car to teammate Jones for the race due to the latter's car failure and had to race with the spare car. That proved disastrous when his engine failed, preventing him from scoring points in a race where he had qualified in 3rd place.

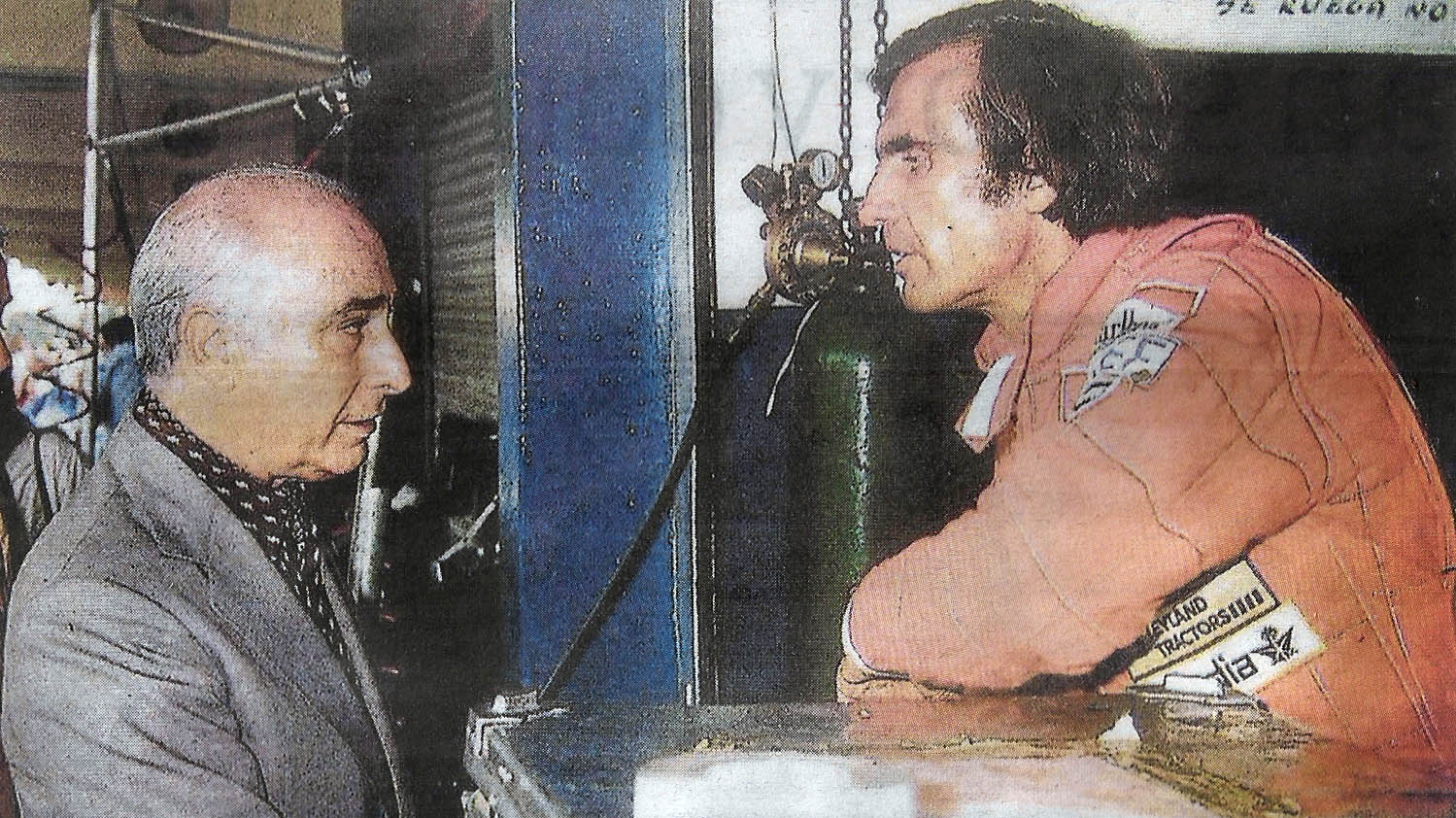
Reutemann with Juan Manuel Fangio at the 1981 Argentine Grand Prix

Reutemann arrived in Las Vegas with a one-point lead in the championship over Brazilian Nelson Piquet. He began the race from pole position, ahead of Jones, who had vowed not to provide any "help" in Reutemann's quest, while Piquet was fourth. At the start, Jones jumped into the lead and Reutemann was quickly passed by Villeneuve, Alain Prost, and Bruno Giacomelli.

On lap 17, battling over seventh place as they approached the last left-hander before the pits, Piquet's Brabham was nearly touching the back of Reutemann's Williams. Piquet got around Reutemann on the inside when Reutemann, fighting for the championship, braked early. On the next lap, Andretti also went by Reutemann. Piquet put himself in a position to score points when he took over sixth place from John Watson on lap 22. Reutemann continued to slip backwards with gearbox trouble, having lost fourth gear as early as lap two. Reutemann finished the race in eighth, a lap down, and the title went to Piquet. Meanwhile, if that year's season opener, in South Africa, which had been run as a Formula Libre race and one which Ferrari, Alfa Romeo, Renault, and Ligier didn't attend, had been a race with World Championship points awarded, Reutemann would have been World Champion with 58 points against Piquet's 56.

He returned with Williams for 1982, finishing second in the South African Grand Prix, the only Cosworth-engined runner able to take the fight to the much more powerful turbo-engined Renaults. The Falklands War, however, generated a tense political period between Argentina and the United Kingdom, and Reutemann chose to distance himself from the team and retire after the Brazilian race. In light of the further developments that took place in Reutemann's life, many felt that his decision to terminate his racing career was made with an eye to his future in politics. This is disputed by Williams's Chief Designer Patrick Head, who felt that the Falklands War was only an excuse and that Reutemann had simply retired because "his heart wasn't in it anymore".

After his retirement, Reutemann was invited by Guy Ligier to test a Ligier in a 1984 pre-season test. He tested a Ligier JS21 modified to test the new-for 1984 Renault Gordini EF4 V6 turbo. The test took place at Paul Ricard in November 1983 and he used Michel Ferté's helmet, who was also present at the test. This was his only test and he never drove in the 1984 season.

=== Formula One: legacy ===
In 2016, in an academic paper that reported a mathematical modeling study that assessed the relative influence of driver and machine, Reutemann was ranked the 27th best Formula One driver of all time.

=== Rallying career ===
Reutemann was approached by Fiat during the 1980 F1 season with an offer to drive a Fiat 131 in the inaugural 1980 Codasur Rally (now Rally Argentina), where he finished in third place. In 1985, he accepted another offer to drive in the Argentinian Rally, this time by Peugeot. Driving a 205 T16 Reutemann again finished in third place.

== Political career ==
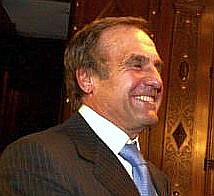
Reutemann in 2003.

After retiring from racing, Reutemann's popularity led the Justicialist Party of the province of Santa Fe to invite him to run for governor. He won the election and ran the province for one four-year term (1991–1995). The provincial constitution does not allow for re-election, but after four years Reutemann presented again and won the governorship for the period 1999–2003. During those years, his profile grew and he became one of the leading politicians in Santa Fe and in Argentina.

Reutemann's second term was marked by the nationwide economic problems brought by the recession that had started in 1999 and ultimately led to the socioeconomic crash of 2001. Under Reutemann, Santa Fe kept a conservative fiscal policy, whereby it applied discounts and froze public workers' salaries and pensions through an Economic Emergency Law. The province was among the few not to resort to the issue of government bonds as a form of quasi-currency, and thus did not become highly indebted.

After the 2001 crash and the resignation of Fernando de la Rúa, Reutemann surprised and disappointed many by declining, on several occasions, to run for president. He finally presented himself for the 2003 general election and won a seat in the National Senate.

During the 2005 legislative elections Reutemann chose not to be a major participant in the campaign. After the Justicialist Party lost to the Socialist Party candidates for the first time in Santa Fe, members of the party were rumored to be unhappy about Reutemann's low profile. Reutemann also declined to run for governor of Santa Fe again in the 2007 elections.

On 1 January 2006, Reutemann was named Commendatore della Repubblica by President of the Italian Republic Carlo Azeglio Ciampi.

During a session in the Argentine Senate on 17 July 2008, Reutemann presented an alternative project for the Commission of Agriculture in opposition to the one of then Vice-president Julio Cobos. His project didn't pass, and in February 2009 he renounced his role in the Bloque Parliamentario del Frente para la Victoria to create his own political fraction, "Santa Fe Federal", with the intention of protecting the interests of the province.

Reutemann was re-elected to the Senate both in 2009 and 2015, when he formed part of the Cambiemos alliance nationally and supported Mauricio Macri in the presidential election. He died in office, so María Alejandra Vucasovich replaced him for the remainder of his term.

== Death ==
Reutemann suffered an intestinal haemorrhage in May 2021, and was hospitalized. His condition worsened, and he suffered from anaemia, dehydration, hypoalbuminemia, haemodynamic instability, and very rapid weight loss. He died on 7 July, at 79 years old, and the news was announced by his daughter on social media.

Many Argentine politicians gave their condolences through their Twitter accounts, such as the presidents Mauricio Macri, Alberto Fernández, and Cristina Fernández de Kirchner, and many from both major parties, Juntos por el Cambio and Frente de Todos.

== Racing record ==
=== Career summary ===
Season	Series	Team	Races	Wins	Poles	F/Laps	Podiums	Points	Position
1970	European Formula Two	Automovil Club Argentino	7	0	0	0	0	3	13th
1971	European Formula Two	Automovil Club Argentino	11	0	1	1	6	38	**2nd**
1972	Formula One	Motor Racing Developments	10	0	1	0	0	3	16th
1972	European Formula Two	Motul Rondel Racing	10	0	0	0	4	26	4th
1973	Formula One	Motor Racing Developments	15	0	0	0	2	16	7th
1973	24 Hours of Le Mans	Scuderia Ferrari	1	0	0	0	0	N/A	DNF
1974	Formula One	Motor Racing Developments	14	3	1	1	4	32	6th
1974	Formula One	Hitachi Team Brabham	1	0	0	0	0	32	6th
1975	Formula One	Martini Racing	14	1	0	0	6	37	**3rd**
1976	Formula One	Martini Racing	12	0	0	0	0	3	16th
1976	Formula One	SEFAC Ferrari	1	0	0	0	0	3	16th
1977	Formula One	SEFAC Ferrari	17	1	0	0	6	42	4th
1978	Formula One	SEFAC Ferrari	16	4	2	2	7	48	**3rd**
1979	Formula One	Martini Racing Team Lotus	15	0	0	0	4	20	7th
1979	BMW M1 Procar Championship	BMW Motorsport	1	0	0	0	0	3	25th
1980	Formula One	Albilad Williams Racing Team	14	1	0	1	8	42	**3rd**
1980	BMW M1 Procar Championship	BMW Motorsport	8	1	0	0	2	64	5th
1980	World Rally Championship	Fiat Italia	1	0	0	0	1	12	21st
1981	Formula One	Albilad Williams Racing Team	6	2	1	1	5	49	**2nd**
1981	Formula One	TAG Williams Team	9	0	1	1	2	49	**2nd**
1982	Formula One	TAG Williams Team	2	0	0	0	1	6	15th
1985	World Rally Championship	Peugeot Sport	1	0	0	0	1	12	18th

=== Complete Formula One World Championship results ===
(key) (Races in bold indicate pole position, races in italics indicate fastest lap)

Year	Entrant	Chassis	Engine	1	2	3	4	5	6	7	8	9	10	11	12	13	14	15	16	17	WDC	Points
1972	Motor Racing Developments	Brabham BT34	Ford Cosworth DFV 3.0 V8	**ARG**; 7	RSA; Ret	ESP	MON														16th	3
1972	Motor Racing Developments	Brabham BT37	Ford Cosworth DFV 3.0 V8					BEL; 13	FRA; 12	GBR; 8	GER; Ret	AUT; Ret	ITA; Ret	CAN; 4	USA; Ret						16th	3
1973	Motor Racing Developments	Brabham BT37	Ford Cosworth DFV 3.0 V8	ARG; Ret	BRA; 11	RSA; 7															7th	16
1973	Motor Racing Developments	Brabham BT42	Ford Cosworth DFV 3.0 V8				ESP; Ret	BEL; Ret	MON; Ret	SWE; 4	FRA; 3	GBR; 6	NED; Ret	GER; Ret	AUT; 4	ITA; 6	CAN; 8	USA; 3			7th	16
1974	Motor Racing Developments	Brabham BT44	Ford Cosworth DFV 3.0 V8	ARG; 7	BRA; 7	RSA; 1	ESP; Ret		MON; Ret	SWE; Ret	NED; 12	FRA; Ret	GBR; 6	GER; 3	AUT; 1	ITA; Ret	CAN; 9	**USA**; 1			6th	32
1974	Hitachi Team Brabham	Brabham BT44	Ford Cosworth DFV 3.0 V8					BEL; Ret													6th	32
1975	Martini Racing	Brabham BT44B	Ford Cosworth DFV 3.0 V8	ARG; 3	BRA; 8	RSA; 2	ESP; 3^{‡}	MON; 9	BEL; 3	SWE; 2	NED; 4	FRA; 14	GBR; Ret	GER; 1	AUT; 14	ITA; 4	USA; Ret				**3rd**	**37**
1976	Martini Racing	Brabham BT45	Alfa Romeo 115-12 3.0 F12	BRA; 12	RSA; Ret	USW; Ret	ESP; 4	BEL; Ret	MON; Ret	SWE; Ret	FRA; 11	GBR; Ret	GER; Ret	AUT; Ret	NED; Ret						16th	3
1976	SEFAC Ferrari	Ferrari 312T2	Ferrari 015 3.0 F12													ITA; 9	CAN	USA	JPN		16th	3
1977	SEFAC Ferrari	Ferrari 312T2B	Ferrari 015 3.0 F12	ARG; 3	BRA; 1	RSA; 8	USW; Ret	ESP; 2	MON; 3	BEL; Ret	SWE; 3	FRA; 6	GBR; 15	GER; 4	AUT; 4	NED; 6	ITA; Ret	USA; 6	CAN; Ret	JPN; 2	4th	42
1978	SEFAC Ferrari	Ferrari 312T2B	Ferrari 015 3.0 F12	ARG; 7	BRA; 1																**3rd**	**48**
1978	SEFAC Ferrari	Ferrari 312T3	Ferrari 015 3.0 F12			RSA; Ret	**USW**; 1	**MON**; 8	BEL; 3	ESP; Ret	SWE; 10	FRA; 18	GBR; 1	GER; Ret	AUT; DSQ	NED; 7	ITA; 3	USA; 1	CAN; 3		**3rd**	**48**
1979	Martini Racing Team Lotus	Lotus 79	Ford Cosworth DFV 3.0 V8	ARG; 2	BRA; 3	RSA; 5	USW; Ret	ESP; 2	BEL; 4	MON; 3	FRA; 13	GBR; 8	GER; Ret	AUT; Ret	NED; Ret	ITA; 7	CAN; Ret	USA; Ret			7th	20 (25)
1980	Albilad Williams Racing Team	Williams FW07B	Ford Cosworth DFV 3.0 V8	ARG; Ret	BRA; Ret	RSA; 5	USW; Ret	BEL; 3	MON; 1	FRA; 6	GBR; 3	GER; 2	AUT; 3	NED; 4	ITA; 3	CAN; 2	USA; 2				**3rd**	**42 (49)**
1981	Albilad Williams Racing Team	Williams FW07C	Ford Cosworth DFV 3.0 V8	USW; 2	BRA; 1	ARG; 2	SMR; 3	**BEL**; 1	MON; Ret												**2nd**	**49**
1981	TAG Williams Team	Williams FW07C	Ford Cosworth DFV 3.0 V8							ESP; 4	FRA; 10	GBR; 2	GER; Ret	AUT; 5	NED; Ret	ITA; 3	CAN; 10	**CPL**; 8			**2nd**	**49**
1982	TAG Williams Team	Williams FW07C	Ford Cosworth DFV 3.0 V8	RSA; 2	BRA; Ret	USW	SMR	BEL	MON	DET	CAN	NED	GBR	FRA	GER	AUT	SUI	ITA	CPL		15th	6

Notes

- ^{‡} – ^{‡} Half points were awarded because the races were stopped before 75% of the scheduled distance was completed.

=== Non-championship Formula One results ===
(key) (Races in bold indicate pole position, races in italics indicate fastest lap) (Races in italics indicate fastest lap)

Year	Entrant	Chassis	Engine	1	2	3	4	5	6	7	8
1971	Ecurie Bonnier	McLaren M7C	Ford Cosworth DFV 3.0 V8	ARG; 3	ROC	QUE	SPR	INT	RIN	OUL	
1971	Motor Racing Developments	Brabham BT33	Ford Cosworth DFV 3.0 V8								VIC; 9
1972	Motor Racing Developments	Brabham BT34	Ford Cosworth DFV 3.0 V8	ROC	BRA; 1	INT	OUL	REP			
1972	Motor Racing Developments	Brabham BT37	Ford Cosworth DFV 3.0 V8						VIC; 10		
1974	Motor Racing Developments	Brabham BT44	Ford Cosworth DFV 3.0 V8	**PRE**; Ret	ROC; Ret	INT					
1975	Martini Racing	Brabham BT44B	Ford Cosworth DFV 3.0 V8	ROC	INT; 8	SUI					
1979	Martini Racing Team Lotus	Lotus 79	Ford Cosworth DFV 3.0 V8	ROC	GNM	DIN; 2					
1980	Albilad-Williams Racing Team	Williams FW07B	Ford Cosworth DFV 3.0 V8	ESP; Ret							
1981	Albilad-Williams Racing Team	Williams FW07C	Ford Cosworth DFV 3.0 V8	RSA; 1							

=== Complete 24 Hours of Le Mans results ===
Year	Team	Co-Drivers	Car	Class	Laps	Pos.	Class Pos.
1973	(Italy) SpA Ferrari SEFAC	(Australia) Tim Schenken	Ferrari 312PB	S 3.0	182	DNF	DNF

=== Complete WRC results ===
Year	Entrant	Car	1	2	3	4	5	6	7	8	9	10	11	12	WDC	Points
1980	Fiat Italia	Fiat 131 Abarth	MON	SWE	POR	KEN	GRC	ARG; 3	FIN	NZL	ITA	FRA	GBR	CIV	21st	12
1985	Peugeot Talbot Sport	Peugeot 205 Turbo 16	MON	SWE	POR	KEN	FRA	GRC	NZL	ARG; 3	FIN	ITA	CIV	GBR	18th	12

== Notes ==
Sporting positions
Preceded by Pablo Brea	Argentine Formula Two Champion; 1969	Succeeded by Osvaldo Bessia
Political offices
Preceded by Víctor Reviglio	Governor of Santa Fe; 1991–1995	Succeeded by Jorge Obeid
Preceded by Jorge Obeid	Governor of Santa Fe; 1999–2003	Succeeded by Jorge Obeid
