= Álvaro González (politician) =

Argentine politician

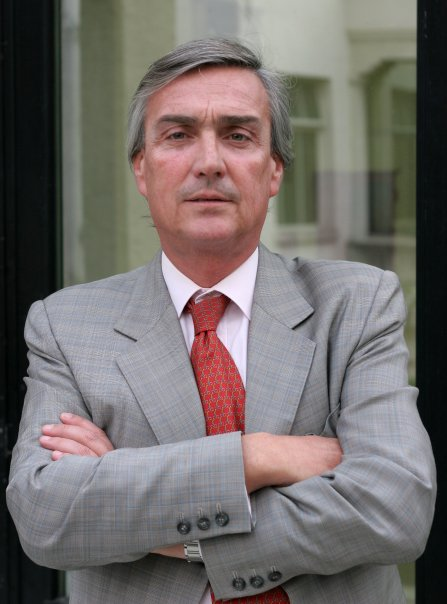

National Deputy
- Incumbent
- Assumed office 10 December 2015
- Constituency: City of Buenos Aires

First Vice President of the Chamber of Deputies
- In office 10 December 2019 – 10 December 2020
- President: Sergio Massa
- Preceded by: José Luis Gioja
- Succeeded by: Omar De Marchi

Legislator of the City of Buenos Aires
- In office 10 December 2003 – 10 December 2011

Personal details
- Born: 12 October 1958 (age 67) Buenos Aires, Argentina
- Party: Justicialist Party (until 2003); Republican Proposal (since 2003)
- Other political affiliations: Juntos por el Cambio (2015–present)
- Education: National University of the Littoral

Álvaro Gustavo González (born 12 October 1958) is an Argentine lawyer and politician, currently serving as National Deputy elected in the Federal Capital. A member of Republican Proposal, González was first elected in 2015. González was Vice President of the Chamber from 2019 to 2020.

González was member of the Buenos Aires City Legislature from 2003 to 2011.

== Early life and education ==
González was born on 12 October 1958 in Buenos Aires, but grew up in Santa Fe. He finished high school at Colegio La Salle and studied law at the National University of the Littoral, graduating in 1984.

== Political career ==
In 1984, González began working at the provincial Senate of Santa Fe, and later worked as an aide in the province's Ministry of Public Works, Health and Environment. From 1987 to 1989 he was a personal advisor to Governor Víctor Reviglio. Later, from 1989 to 1991, he was undersecretary of public affairs. He also served as an aide in the provincial Chamber of Deputies and in the Justice Ministry.

In the 2003 legislative election in Buenos Aires, González was elected to the City Legislature as part of the "Porteño Generational Movement" list within the Commitment to Change alliance. He was re-elected in 2007 as the 16th candidate in the Republican Proposal list.

In 2011, Chief of Government of Buenos Aires Mauricio Macri appointed González as undersecretary of public affairs, under then-cabinet chief Horacio Rodríguez Larreta. In the 2015 legislative election, González ran for a seat in the Argentine Chamber of Deputies as the fifth candidate in the Cambiemos list in Buenos Aires. The list received 45.80% of the votes, and González was elected. González was re-elected in 2019, again as the fifth candidate in the Juntos por el Cambio list.

As a national deputy, Polledo formed part of the parliamentary commissions on Accounting Oversight, Analysis of Tax Norms, Energy and Fuels, Finances, Political Trials, Mining, and Public Works. He was an opponent of the legalization of abortion in Argentina. He voted against the two Voluntary Interruption of Pregnancy bills that were debated by the Argentine Congress in 2018 and 2020.

From 2019 to 2020, he was First Vice President of the Chamber, succeeding José Luis Gioja and preceding Omar De Marchi.

== Electoral history ==
Electoral history of Álvaro González
Election	Office	List	#	District	Votes			Result	Ref.
Election	Office	List	#	District	Total	%	P.	Result	Ref.
2003	City Legislator	Porteño Generational Movement	4	City of Buenos Aires	140,645	8.10%	7th (Note: Presented on an electoral list. The data shown represents the share of the vote the entire party/alliance received in that constituency.)	Elected	
2007	City Legislator	Republican Proposal Alliance	16	City of Buenos Aires	768,748	44.32%	1st	Not elected (Note: Assumed office on 10 December 2007 following the resignation of Mariano Nadorowski.)	
2015	National Deputy	Cambiemos	5	City of Buenos Aires	895,391	45.80%	1st	Elected	
2019	National Deputy	Juntos por el Cambio	5	City of Buenos Aires	1,060,404	53.02%	1st	Elected	
