= Brabham =

British racing car manufacturer and Formula One racing team

- Full name: Motor Racing Developments, Ltd.
- Base: Weybridge, United Kingdom (1962–1977); Chessington, United Kingdom (1977–1989); Milton Keynes, United Kingdom (1990–1992)
- Founder(s): Jack Brabham; Ron Tauranac
- Noted staff: Bernie Ecclestone; Gordon Murray; Ron Dennis; Charlie Whiting; John Judd; Herbie Blash
- Noted drivers: (Australia) Jack Brabham (Brazil) Nelson Piquet (United States) Dan Gurney (New Zealand) Denny Hulme (Austria) Jochen Rindt (Belgium) Jacky Ickx (Switzerland) Silvio Moser (United Kingdom) Graham Hill (Argentina) Carlos Reutemann (Austria) Niki Lauda (Italy) Riccardo Patrese (Italy) Elio de Angelis (United Kingdom) Derek Warwick (Italy) Stefano Modena (United Kingdom) Martin Brundle (Italy) Andrea de Cesaris (Australia) David Brabham (United Kingdom) Damon Hill (Mexico) Héctor Rebaque (United Kingdom) John Watson (Brazil) Carlos Pace

Formula One World Championship career
- First entry: 1962 German Grand Prix
- Races entered: 403 entries (394 starts)
- Engines: Climax, Repco, Ford, Alfa Romeo, BMW, Judd, Yamaha
- Constructors' Championships: 2 (1966, 1967)
- Drivers' Championships: 4 (1966, 1967, 1981, 1983)
- Race victories: 35
- Podiums: 120
- Points: 832
- Pole positions: 40
- Fastest laps: 41 (Note: This is the number of different World Championship races in which a Brabham set the fastest lap time. In the 1969 Canadian Grand Prix, two drivers each set equal fastest lap time in a Brabham.)
- Final entry: 1992 Hungarian Grand Prix

Motor Racing Developments Ltd., commonly known as Brabham (/ˈbræbəm/ BRAB-əm), was a British racing car manufacturer and Formula One racing team. It was founded in 1962 by the Australian driver Jack Brabham and the British-Australian designer Ron Tauranac. The team had a successful thirty-year history, winning four FIA Formula One World Drivers' Championships and two World Constructors' Championships.

Under Brabham and Tauranac, Brabham won double world championships in 1966 and 1967, with the 1966 drivers' title going to Jack Brabham and the 1967 title going to Denny Hulme. Jack Brabham is the only Formula One driver to win a Drivers' Championship in a car bearing his own name. Brabham was the first Formula One team to use a wind tunnel to design cars. It became the world's largest manufacturer of open-wheel racing cars sold to customer teams, having built more than 500 cars by 1970. Teams using Brabham cars won championships in Formula Two and Formula Three. The cars also competed in events like the Indianapolis 500 and Formula 5000 racing.

The businessman Bernie Ecclestone owned Brabham during most of the 1970s and 1980s, and later became responsible for administering the commercial aspects of Formula One. Under Ecclestone and chief designer Gordon Murray, the team won two more Drivers' Championships in the 1980s with Brazilian Nelson Piquet. During this period, the team withdrew from manufacturing customer cars but introduced innovations such as carbon brakes and hydropneumatic suspension; it also reintroduced in-race refuelling. Its unique 'fan car' won its only race, in 1978, before being withdrawn. Piquet won his first championship in 1981 in the ground effect BT49-Ford. In 1983, he became the first driver to win a title with a turbocharged car, the Brabham BT52, which was powered by BMW's M12 straight-four engine and won four Grands Prix that season. Ecclestone sold the team in 1988.

Midway through the 1992 season, the team collapsed financially and was investigated for fraud, as its new owner, Japanese engineering firm Middlebridge, failed to make its loan repayments. In 2009, a German organisation unsuccessfully attempted to enter the 2010 Formula One season using the Brabham name.

== Origins ==
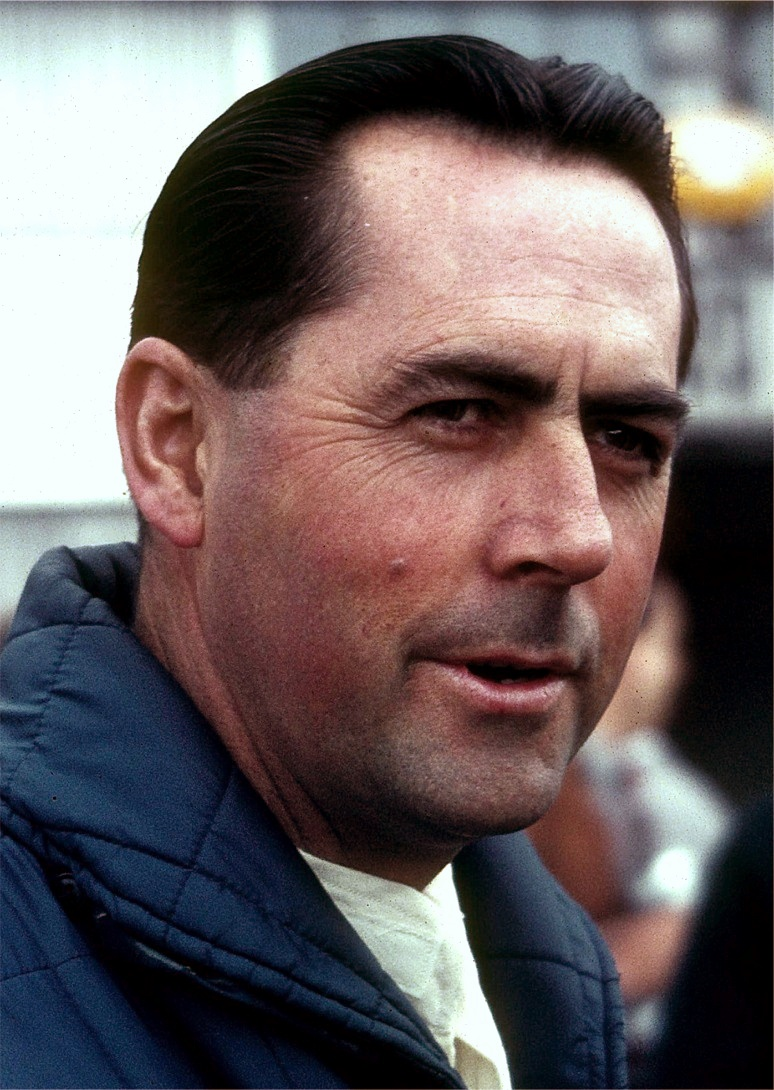
Jack Brabham was 40 when he won the F1 drivers' title in a Brabham car

The Brabham team was founded by Jack Brabham and Ron Tauranac, who met in 1951 while both were successfully building and racing cars in their native Australia. Brabham, who had been a highly successful dirt oval speedway Speedcar driver with multiple Australian national and state titles to his credit before moving full-time into road racing in 1953, was the more successful driver. He went to the United Kingdom in 1955 to further his racing career. There he started driving for the Cooper Car Company works team. By 1958, he had progressed with them to Formula One, the highest category of open-wheel racing defined by the Fédération Internationale de l'Automobile (FIA), motorsport's world governing body. (Note: "FIA" has been used throughout this article to refer to the motor sports governing body. Until 1978 motor sport was governed directly by the Commission Sportive Internationale (CSI) and from 1978 by the Fédération Internationale du Sport Automobile (FISA), both subsidiary bodies of the FIA. In 1992 the FIA subsumed FISA and its governing role.) In 1959 and 1960, Brabham won the Formula One World Drivers' Championship in Cooper's revolutionary mid-engined cars.

Despite their innovation of placing the engine behind the driver, the Coopers and their chief designer, Owen Maddock, were generally resistant to developing their cars. Brabham pushed for further advances, and played a significant role in developing Cooper's highly successful 1960 T53 "lowline" car, with input from his friend Tauranac. Brabham was confident he could do better than Cooper. In late 1959, he asked Tauranac to come to the UK and work with him. Initially, they produced upgrade kits for Sunbeam Rapier and Triumph Herald road cars at his car dealership, Jack Brabham Motors. However, their long-term aim was to design racing cars. Brabham described Tauranac as "absolutely the only bloke I'd have gone into partnership with". Later, Brabham offered a Coventry-Climax FWE-engined version of the Herald, with 83 hp (62 kW) and uprated suspension to match the extra power.

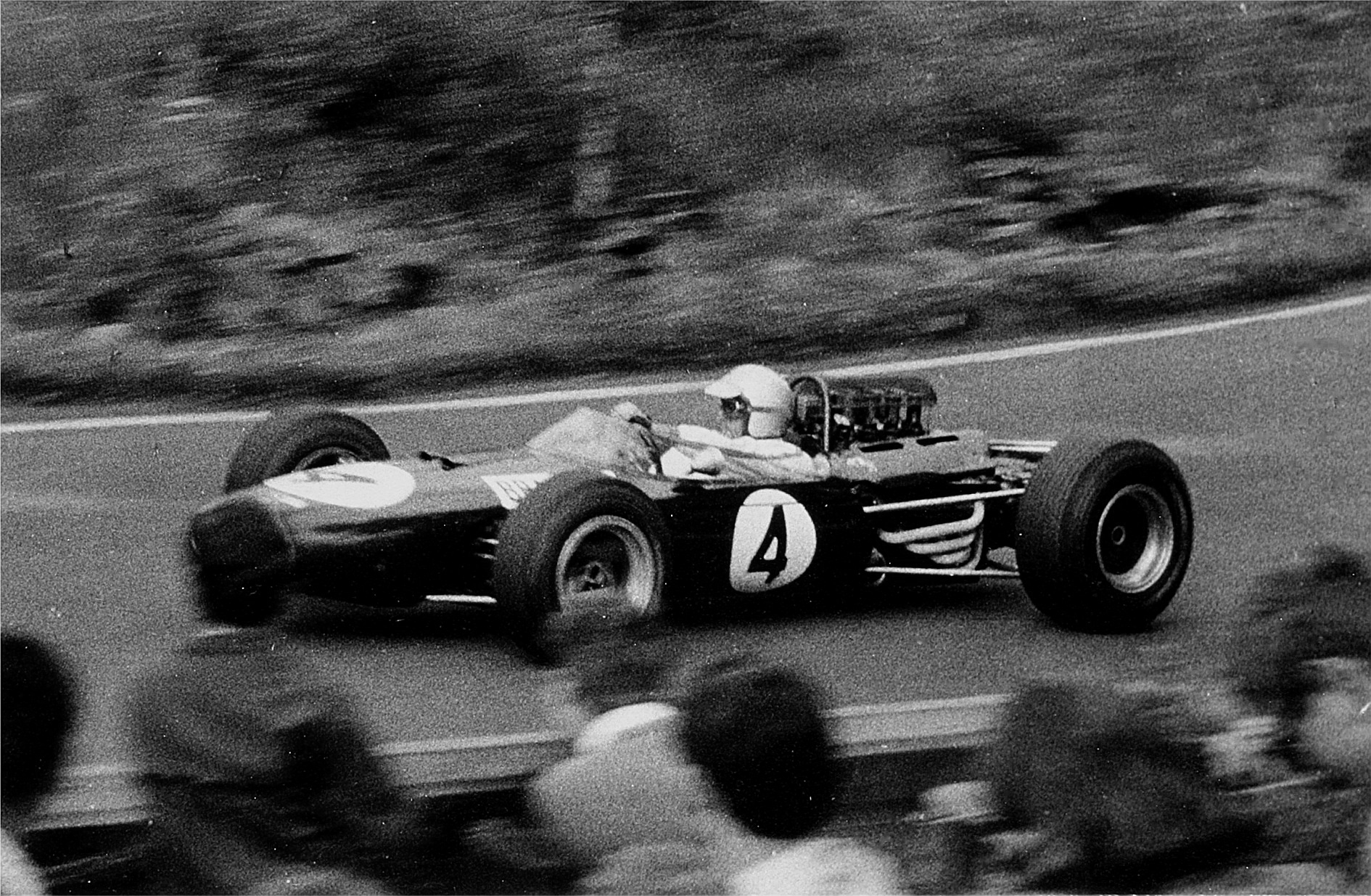
Brabham in a 1965 Grand Prix car

To meet their aim of designing racing cars, Brabham and Tauranac set up Motor Racing Developments Ltd. (MRD), deliberately avoiding the use of either man's name. The new company would compete with Cooper in the market for customer-built racing cars. As Brabham was still employed by Cooper, Tauranac produced the first MRD car, for the entry level Formula Junior class, in secrecy. Unveiled in the summer of 1961, the "MRD" was soon renamed. Motoring journalist Jabby Crombac pointed out that "[the] way a Frenchman pronounces those initials—written phonetically, 'em air day'—sounded perilously like the French word... merde." Gavin Youl achieved a second-place finish at Goodwood and another at Mallory Park in the MRD-Ford. The cars were subsequently known as Brabhams, with type numbers starting with BT for "Brabham Tauranac".

By the 1961 Formula One season, the Lotus and Ferrari teams had developed the mid-engined approach further than Cooper. Brabham had a poor season, scoring only four points, and—having run his own private Coopers in non-championship events during 1961—left the company in 1962 to drive for his own team: the Brabham Racing Organisation, using cars built by Motor Racing Developments. The team was based at New Haw in Weybridge in England until 1977, when it moved to a new base at Chessington. The team held a British licence.

== Racing history in Formula One ==
=== Jack Brabham and Ron Tauranac (1961–1970) ===
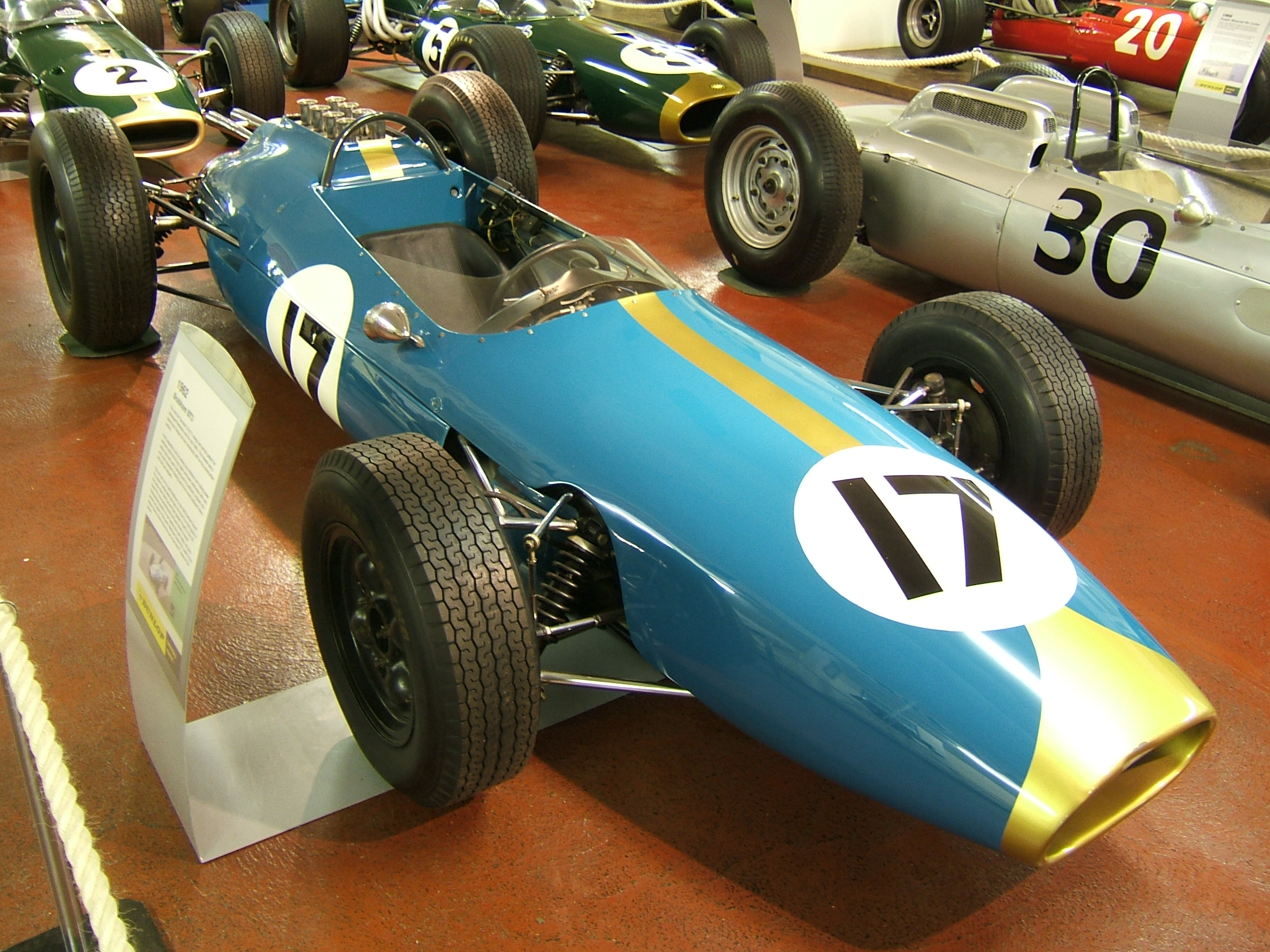
The Brabham BT3, the first Brabham Formula One design

Motor Racing Developments initially concentrated on making money by building cars for sale to customers in lower formulae, so the new car for the Formula One team was not ready until partway through the 1962 Formula One season. The Brabham Racing Organisation (BRO) started the year fielding a customer Lotus chassis, which was delivered at 3am to keep it a secret. Brabham took two points finishes in Lotuses, before the turquoise-liveried Brabham BT3 car made its debut at the 1962 German Grand Prix. It retired with a throttle problem after 9 of the 15 laps, but went on to take a pair of fourth places at the end of the season.

From the 1963 season, Brabham was partnered by American driver Dan Gurney, the pair now running in Australia's racing colours of green and gold. Brabham took the team's first win at the non-championship Solitude Grand Prix in 1963. Gurney took the marque's first two wins in the world championship, at the 1964 French and Mexican Grands Prix. Brabham works and customer cars took another three non-championship wins during the 1964 season. The 1965 season was less successful, with no championship wins. Brabham finished third or fourth in the Constructors' Championship for three years running, but poor reliability marred promising performances on several occasions. Motor sport authors Mike Lawrence and David Hodges have said that a lack of resources may have cost the team results, a view echoed by Tauranac.

The Brabham Racing Organisation entered the "works" cars until 1968.

The Repco Brabham logo from the 1960s, illustrating the joint branding of the period

The FIA doubled the Formula One engine capacity limit to 3 litres for the 1966 season and suitable engines were scarce. Brabham used engines from Australian engineering firm Repco, which had never produced a Formula One engine before, based on aluminium V8 engine blocks from the defunct American Oldsmobile F85 road car project, and other off-the-shelf parts. Consulting and design engineer Phil Irving (of Vincent Motorcycle fame) was the project engineer responsible for producing the initial version of the engine. Few expected the Brabham-Repcos to be competitive, but the light and reliable cars ran at the front from the start of the season. At the French Grand Prix at Reims-Gueux, Brabham became the first man to win a Formula One world championship race in a car bearing his own name. Only his former teammate, Bruce McLaren, has since matched the achievement. It was the first in a run of four straight wins for the Australian veteran. Brabham won his third title in 1966, becoming the only driver to win the Formula One World Championship in a car carrying his own name (cf Surtees, Hill and Fittipaldi Automotive). In 1967, the title went to Brabham's teammate, New Zealander Denny Hulme. Hulme had better reliability through the year, possibly due to Brabham's desire to try new parts first. The Brabham team took the Constructors' World Championship in both years.

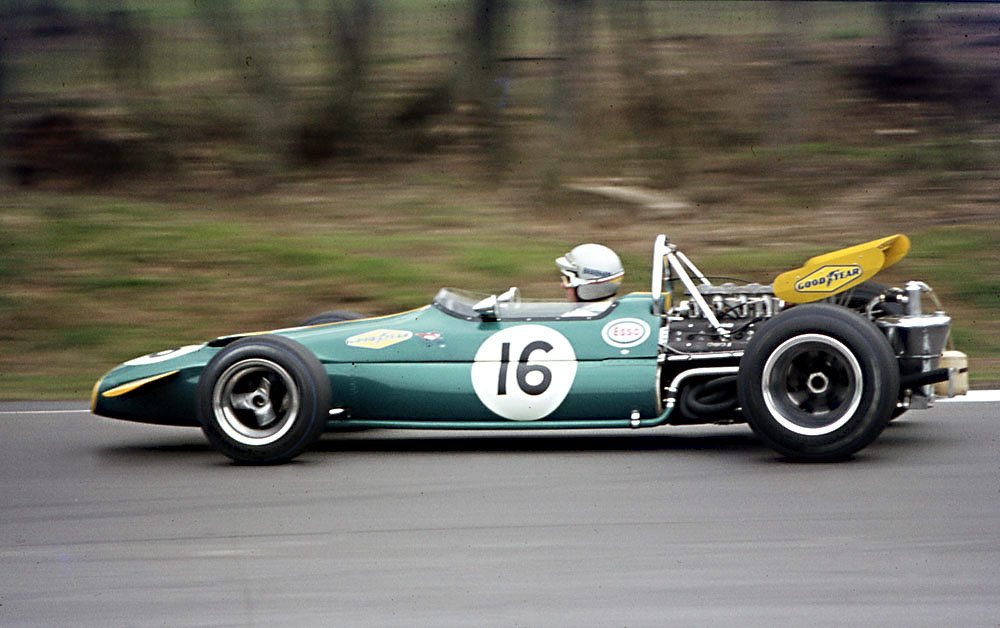
Brabham BT33. Technically conservative, Brabham did not produce a monocoque car until 1970.

For 1968, Austrian Jochen Rindt replaced Hulme, who had left to join McLaren. Repco produced a more powerful version of their V8 to maintain competitiveness against Ford's new Cosworth DFV, but it proved very unreliable. Slow communications between the UK and Australia had always made identifying and correcting problems very difficult. The car was fast—Rindt set pole position twice during the season—but Brabham and Rindt finished only three races between them, and ended the year with only ten points.

Although Brabham bought Cosworth DFV engines for the 1969 season, Rindt left to join Lotus. His replacement, Jacky Ickx, had a strong second half to the season, winning in Germany and Canada, after Brabham was sidelined by a testing accident. Ickx finished second in the Drivers' Championship, with 37 points to Jackie Stewart's 63. Brabham himself took a couple of pole positions and two top-3 finishes, but did not finish half the races. The team were second in the Constructors' Championship, aided by second places at Monaco and Watkins Glen scored by Piers Courage, driving a Brabham for the Frank Williams Racing Cars privateer squad.

Brabham took his last win in the opening race of the 1970 season and was competitive throughout the year, although mechanical failures blunted his challenge. After losing secured victories in the last corner at both Monaco and England, Jack decided he had had enough, and sold his part in the company to former Jochen Rindt manager, a businessman named Bernie Ecclestone, at the end of the year. Aided by number-two driver Rolf Stommelen, the team came fourth in the Constructors' Championship.

=== Ron Tauranac (1971) ===
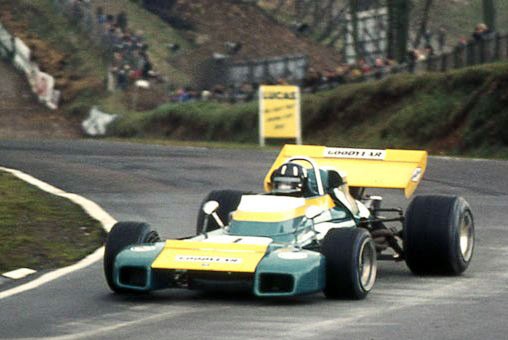
Brabham BT34. Graham Hill took his final Formula One win in the non-championship BRDC International Trophy at Silverstone.

Tauranac signed double world champion Graham Hill and young Australian Tim Schenken to drive for the 1971 season. Tauranac designed the unusual 'lobster claw' BT34, featuring twin radiators mounted ahead of the front wheels, a single example of which was built for Hill. Although Hill, no longer a front-runner since his 1969 accident, took his final Formula One win in the non-championship BRDC International Trophy at Silverstone, the team scored only seven championship points.

=== Bernie Ecclestone (1972–1988) ===
Tauranac left Brabham early in the 1972 season after Ecclestone changed the way the company was organised without consulting him. Ecclestone has since said "In retrospect, the relationship was never going to work", noting that "[Tauranac and I] both take the view: 'Please be reasonable, do it my way'". The highlights of an aimless year, during which the team ran three different models, were pole position for Argentinian driver Carlos Reutemann at his home race at Buenos Aires and a victory in the non-championship Interlagos Grand Prix. For the 1973 season, Ecclestone promoted the young South African engineer Gordon Murray to chief designer and moved Herbie Blash from the Formula Two programme to become the Formula One team manager. Both would remain with the team for the next 15 years. For 1973, Murray produced the triangular cross-section BT42, with which Reutemann scored two podium finishes and finished seventh in the Drivers' Championship.

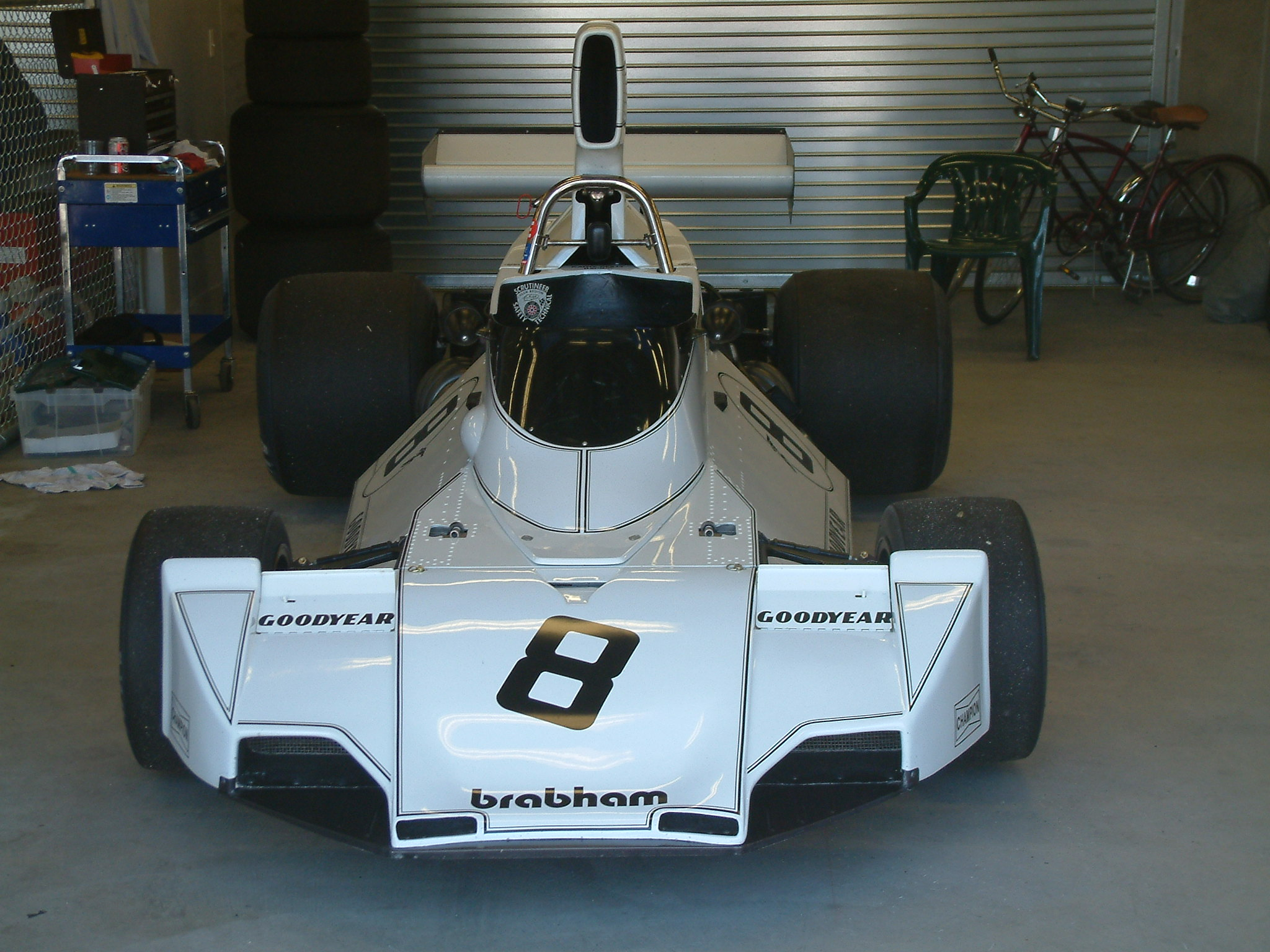
The Brabham BT44 on display in 2003. The car was used in the 1974 and 1975 seasons.

In the 1974 season, Reutemann took the first three victories of his Formula One career, and Brabham's first since 1970. The team finished a close fifth in the Constructors' Championship, fielding the much more competitive BT44s. After a strong finish to the 1974 season, many observers felt the team were favourites to win the 1975 title. The year started well, with a first win for Brazilian driver Carlos Pace at the Interlagos circuit in his native São Paulo. However, as the season progressed, tyre wear frequently slowed the cars in races, and the team was constantly outperformed by Ferrari and McLaren. Pace took another two podiums and finished sixth in the championship; while Reutemann had five podium finishes, including a dominant win in the 1975 German Grand Prix, and finished third in the Drivers' Championship. The team likewise ranked second in the Constructors' Championship at the end of the year.

While rival teams Lotus and McLaren relied on the Cosworth DFV engine from the late 1960s to the early 1980s, Ecclestone sought a competitive advantage by investigating other options. Despite the success of Murray's Cosworth-powered cars, Ecclestone signed a deal with Italian motor manufacturer Alfa Romeo to use their large and powerful flat-12 engine from the 1976 season. The engines were free, but they rendered the new BT45s, now in red Martini Racing livery, unreliable and overweight. At that time, designer David North was hired to work alongside Murray. The 1976 and 1977 seasons saw Brabham fall toward the back of the field again. Reutemann negotiated a release from his contract before the end of the 1976 season and signed with Ferrari. Ulsterman John Watson replaced him at Brabham for 1977. Watson lost near certain victory in the French Grand Prix (Dijon) of that year when his car ran low on fuel on the last lap and was passed by Mario Andretti's Lotus, with Watson's second place being the team's best result of the season. The car often showed at the head of races, but the unreliability of the Alfa Romeo engine was a major problem. The team lost Pace early in the 1977 season when he died in a light aircraft accident.

For the 1978 season, Murray's BT46 featured several new technologies to overcome the weight and packaging difficulties caused by the Alfa Romeo engines. Ecclestone signed then two-time Formula One world champion Niki Lauda from Ferrari through a deal with Italian dairy products company Parmalat which met the cost of Lauda ending his Ferrari contract and made up his salary to the £200,000 Ferrari was offering. 1978 was the year of the dominant Lotus 79 "wing car", which used aerodynamic ground effect to stick to the track when cornering, but Lauda won two races in the BT46, one with the controversial "B" or "fan car" version.

The partnership with Alfa Romeo ended during the 1979 season, the team's first with young Brazilian driver Nelson Piquet. Murray designed the full-ground effect BT48 around a rapidly developed new Alfa Romeo V12 engine and incorporated an effective "carbon-carbon braking" system—a technology Brabham pioneered in 1976. However, unexpected movement of the car's aerodynamic centre of pressure made its handling unpredictable and the new engine was unreliable. The team dropped to eighth in the Constructors' Championship by the end of the season. Alfa Romeo started testing their own Formula One car during the season, prompting Ecclestone to revert to Cosworth DFV engines, a move Murray described as being "like having a holiday". The new, lighter, Cosworth-powered BT49 was introduced before the end of the year at the Canadian Grand Prix; where after practice Lauda announced his immediate retirement from driving, later saying that he "was no longer getting any pleasure from driving round and round in circles".

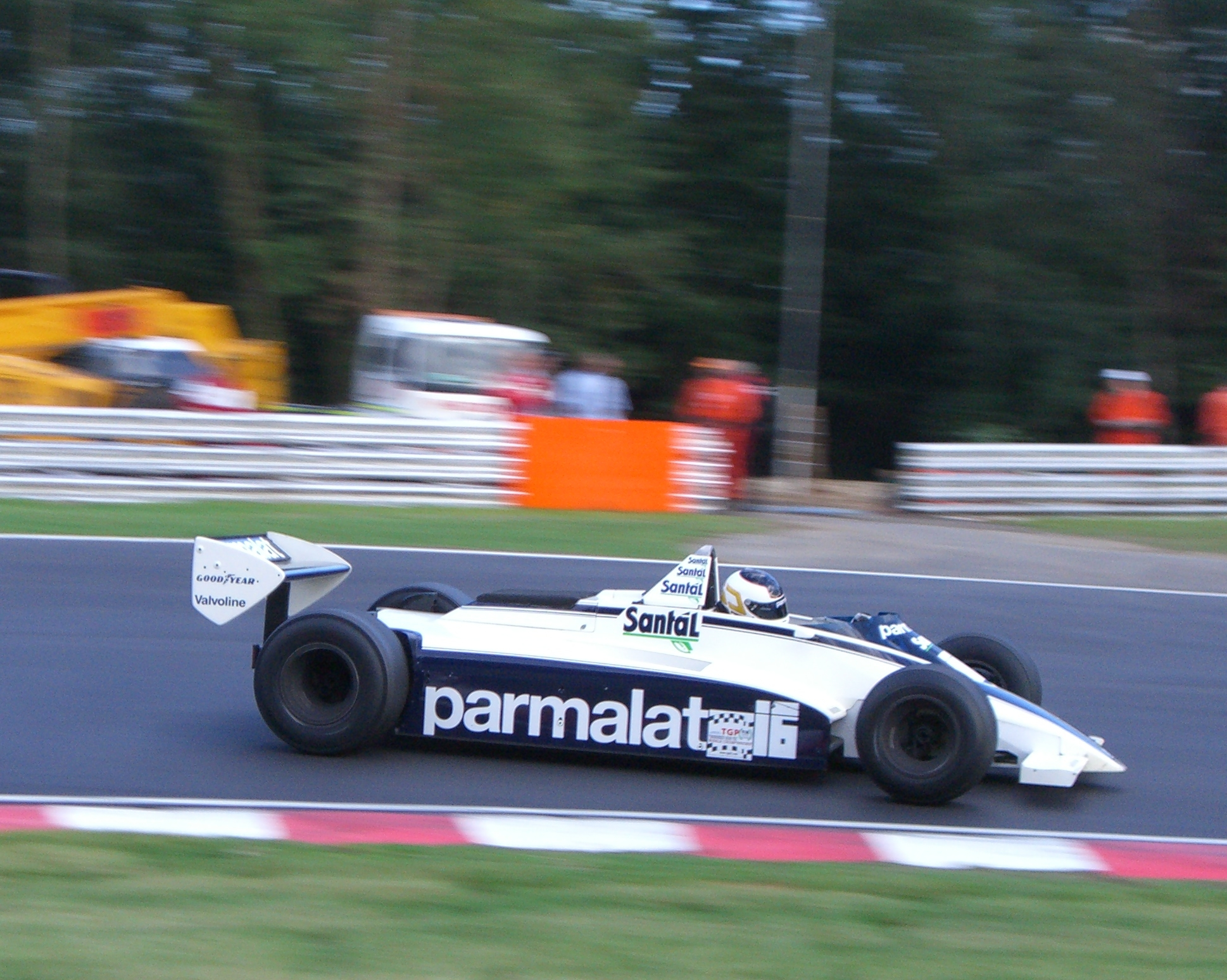
The Brabham BT49 competed over four seasons, winning one championship.

The team used the BT49 over four seasons. In the 1980 season Piquet scored three wins and the team took third in the Constructors' Championship with Piquet second in the Drivers' Championship. This season saw the introduction of the blue and white livery that the cars would wear through several changes of sponsor, until the team's demise in 1992. With a better understanding of ground effect, the team further developed the BT49C for the 1981 season, incorporating a hydropneumatic suspension system to avoid ride height limitations intended to reduce downforce. Piquet, who had developed a close working relationship with Murray, took the drivers' title with three wins, albeit amid accusations of cheating. The team finished second in the Constructors' Championship, behind the Williams team.

Renault had introduced turbocharged engines to Formula One in 1977. Brabham had tested a BMW four-cylinder M12 turbocharged engine in the summer of 1981. For the 1982 season the team designed a new car, the BT50, around the BMW engine which, like the Repco engine 16 years before, was based on a road car engine block, the BMW M10. Brabham continued to run the Cosworth-powered BT49D in the early part of the season while reliability and driveability issues with the BMW units were resolved. The relationship came close to ending, with the German manufacturer insisting that Brabham use their engine. The turbo car took its first win at the Canadian Grand Prix. In the Constructors' Championship, the team finished fifth, the drivers Riccardo Patrese, who scored the last win of the Brabham-Ford combination in the Monaco Grand Prix, 10th and World Champion Piquet a mere 11th in the Drivers' Championship. In the 1983 season, Piquet took the championship lead from Renault's Alain Prost at the last race of the year, the South African Grand Prix to become the first driver to win the Formula One Drivers' World Championship with a turbo-powered car. The team did not win the Constructors' Championship in either 1981 or 1983, despite Piquet's success. Patrese was the only driver other than Piquet to win a race for Brabham in this period—the drivers in the second car contributed only a fraction of the team's points in each of these championship seasons. Patrese finished ninth in the Drivers' Championship with 13 points, dropping the team behind Ferrari and Renault to third in the Constructors' Championship.

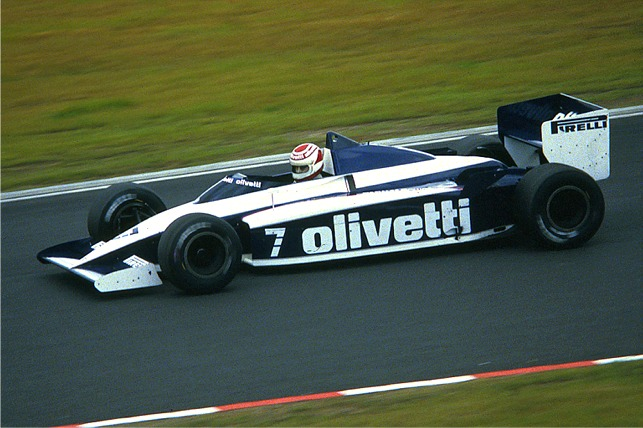
Nelson Piquet and his BT54 were hampered by Pirelli tyres in 1985.

Piquet took the team's last wins: two in 1984 by winning the seventh and eighth races of that season, the Canadian Grand Prix and the Detroit Grand Prix, and one in 1985 by winning the French Grand Prix. He finished fifth in 1984 and a mere eighth in 1985 in the respective Drivers' Championships. After seven years and two world championships, Piquet felt he was worth more than Ecclestone's salary offer for 1986, and reluctantly left for the Williams team at the end of the season.

For the 1986 season, Patrese returned to Brabham, and was joined by Elio de Angelis. The season was a disaster for Brabham, scoring only two points. Murray's radical long and low BT55, with its BMW M12 engine tilted over to improve its aerodynamics and lower its centre of gravity, had severe reliability issues, and the Pirelli tyres performed poorly. De Angelis became the Formula One team's only fatality when he died in a testing accident at the Paul Ricard circuit. Derek Warwick, who replaced de Angelis, was close to scoring two points for fifth in the British Grand Prix, but a problem on the last lap dropped him out of the points.

In August, BMW after considering running their own in-house team, announced their departure from Formula One at the end of the season. Murray, who had largely taken over the running of the team as Ecclestone became more involved with his role at the Formula One Constructors Association, felt that "the way the team had operated for 15 years broke down". He left Brabham in November to join McLaren.

Ecclestone held BMW to their contract for the 1987 season, but the German company would only supply the laydown engine. The upright units, around which Brabham had designed their new car, were sold for use by the Arrows team. Senior figures at Brabham, including Murray, have admitted that by this stage Ecclestone had lost interest in running the team. The 1987 season was only slightly more successful than the previous year—Patrese and de Cesaris scoring 10 points between them, including two third places at the Belgian Grand Prix and the Mexican Grand Prix. Unable to locate a suitable engine supplier, the team missed the FIA deadline for entry into the 1988 world championship and Ecclestone finally announced the team's withdrawal from Formula One at the Brazilian Grand Prix in April 1988. During the season-ending Australian Grand Prix, Ecclestone announced he had sold MRD to EuroBrun team owner Walter Brun for an unknown price.

=== Joachim Lüthi (1989) ===
Brun soon sold the team on, this time to Swiss financier Joachim Lüthi, who brought it back into Formula One for the 1989 season. The new Brabham BT58, powered by a Judd V8 engine (originally another of Jack Brabham's companies), was produced for the 1989 season. Italian driver Stefano Modena, who had driven for the team in the 1987 Australian Grand Prix in a one off drive for the team, drove alongside the more experienced Martin Brundle who was returning to Formula One after spending 1988 winning the World Sportscar Championship for Jaguar. Modena took the team's last podium: a third place at the Monaco Grand Prix (Brundle, who had only just scraped through pre-qualifying by 0.021 seconds before qualifying a brilliant 4th, had been running third but was forced to stop to replace a flat battery, finally finishing sixth). The team also failed to make the grid sometimes: Brundle failed to prequalify at the Canadian Grand Prix and the French Grand Prix. The team finished 9th in the Constructors' Championship at the end of the season.

=== Middlebridge Racing (1989–1992) ===
After Lüthi's arrest on tax fraud charges in mid-1989, several parties disputed the ownership of the team. Middlebridge Group Limited, a Japanese engineering firm owned by billionaire Koji Nakauchi, was already involved with established Formula 3000 team Middlebridge Racing and gained control of Brabham for the 1990 season. Herbie Blash had returned to run the team in 1989 and continued to do so in 1990. Middlebridge paid for its purchase using £1 million loaned to them by finance company Landhurst Leasing, but the team remained underfunded and would only score a few more points finishes in its last three seasons.

Jack Brabham's youngest son, David, raced for the Formula One team for a short time in 1990 including the season-ending Australian Grand Prix (the first time a Brabham had driven a Brabham car in an Australian Grand Prix since 1968). 1990 was another disastrous year, with Modena's fifth place in the season-opening United States Grand Prix being the only top six finish. The team finished ninth in the Constructors' Championship. Brundle and fellow Briton Mark Blundell, scored only three points during the 1991 season. Due to poor results in the first half of 1991, they had to prequalify in the second half of the season; Blundell failed to do so in Japan, as did Brundle in Australia. The team finished 10th in the Constructors' Championship, behind another struggling British team, Lotus. The 1992 season started with Eric van de Poele and Giovanna Amati after Japanese Formula 3000 driver Akihiko Nakaya was denied a superlicense. Damon Hill, the son of another former Brabham driver and World Champion, debuted in the team after Amati was dropped when her sponsorship failed to materialise. Amati, the fifth and last (as of May 2026) woman to race in Formula One, ended her career with three DNQs.

Argentine Sergio Rinland designed the team's final cars around Judd engines, except for 1991 when Yamaha powered the cars. In the 1992 season the cars (which were updated versions of the 1991 car) rarely qualified for races. Hill gave the team its final finish, at the Hungarian Grand Prix, where he crossed the finish line 11th and last, four laps behind the winner, Ayrton Senna. After the end of that race the team ran out of funds and collapsed.

Middlebridge Group Limited had been unable to continue making repayments against the £6 million ultimately provided by Landhurst Leasing, which went into administration. The Serious Fraud Office investigated the case. Landhurst's managing directors were found guilty of corruption and imprisoned, having accepted bribes for further loans to Middlebridge. It was one of four teams to leave Formula One that year. (cf March Engineering, Fondmetal and Andrea Moda Formula). Although there was talk of reviving the team for the following year, its assets passed to Landhurst Leasing and were auctioned by the company's receivers in 1993. Among these was the team's old factory in Chessington, which was acquired by Yamaha Motor Sports and used to house Activa Technology Limited, a company manufacturing composite components for race and road cars run by Herbie Blash. The factory was bought by the Carlin DPR GP2 motor racing team in 2006.

== Motor Racing Developments ==
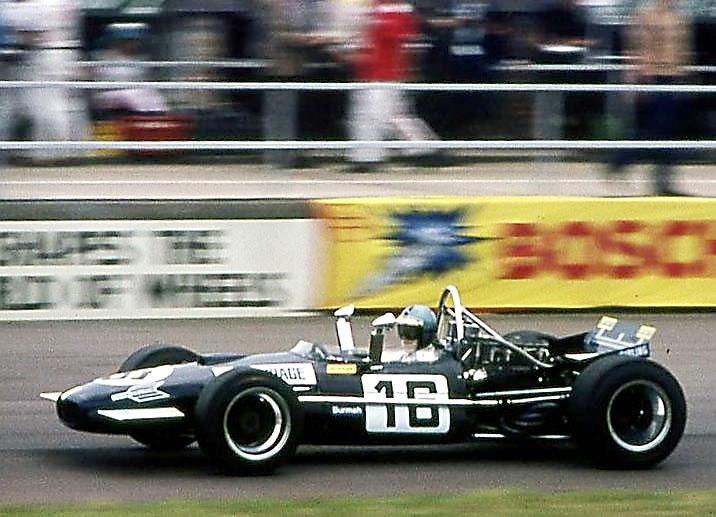
Several F1 teams used Brabhams (Piers Courage, FWRC, 1969).

Brabham cars were also widely used by other teams, and not just in Formula One. Jack Brabham and Ron Tauranac called the company they set up in 1961 to design and build formula racing cars to customer teams Motor Racing Developments (MRD), and this company had a large portfolio of other activities. Initially, Brabham and Tauranac each held 50 per cent of the shares. Tauranac was responsible for design and running the business, while Brabham was the test driver and arranged corporate deals like the Repco engine supply and the use of the MIRA wind tunnel. He also contributed ideas to the design process and often machined parts and helped build the cars.

From 1963 to 1965, MRD was not directly involved in Formula One, and often ran works cars in other formulae. A separate company, Jack Brabham's Brabham Racing Organisation, ran the Formula One works entry. Like other customers, BRO bought its cars from MRD, initially at £3,000 per car, although it did not pay for development parts. Tauranac was unhappy with his distance from the Formula One operation and before the 1966 season suggested that he was no longer interested in producing cars for Formula One under this arrangement. Brabham investigated other chassis suppliers for BRO, however the two reached an agreement and from 1966 MRD was much more closely involved in this category. After Jack Brabham sold his shares in MRD to Ron Tauranac at the end of 1969, the works Formula One team was MRD.

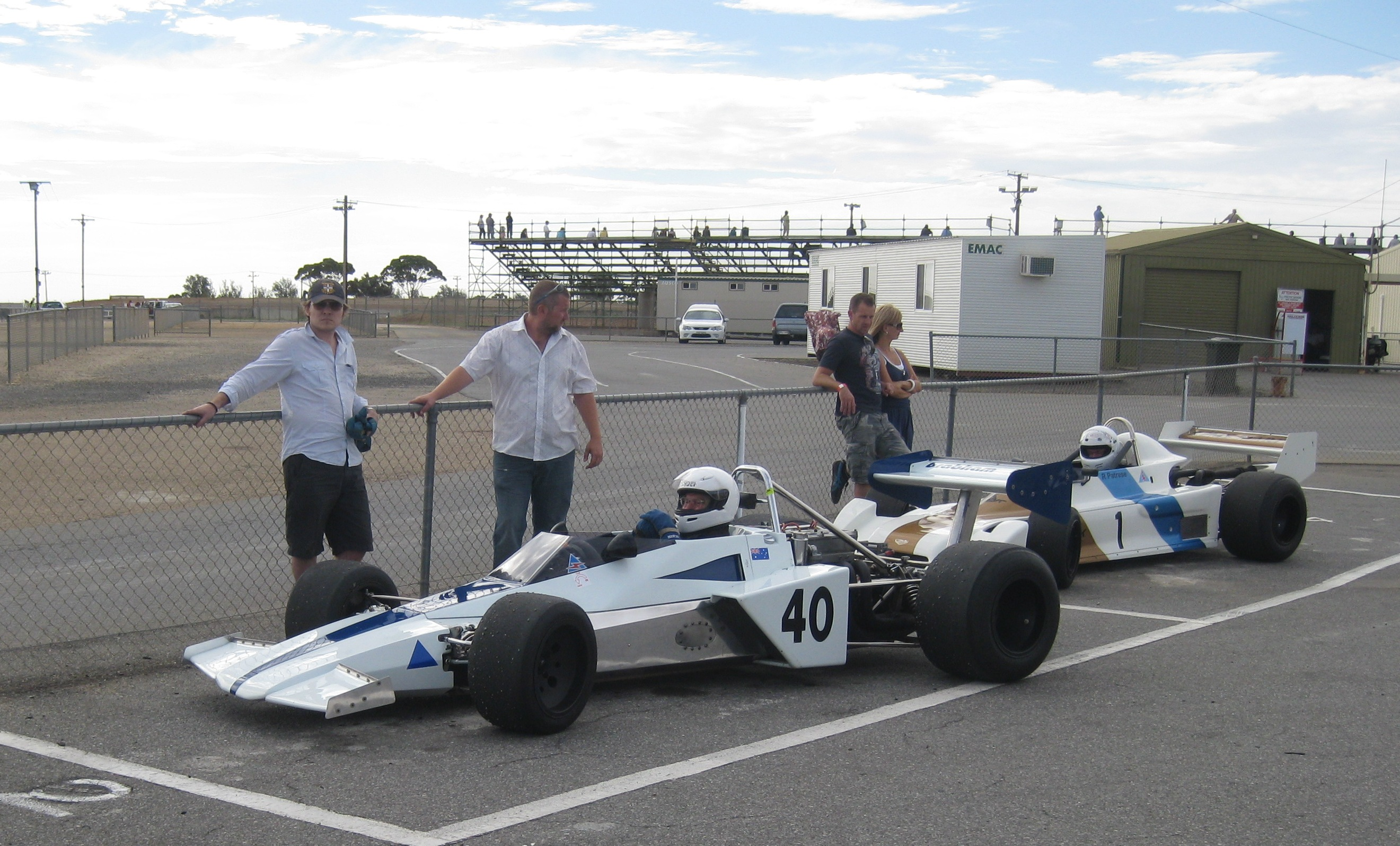
The BT40 was the last Formula Two model from Brabham.

Despite only building its first car in 1961, by the mid-1960s MRD had overtaken established constructors like Cooper to become the largest manufacturer of single-seat racing cars in the world, and by 1970 had built over 500 cars. Of the other Formula One teams which used Brabhams, Frank Williams Racing Cars and the Rob Walker Racing Team were the most successful. The 1965 British Grand Prix saw seven Brabhams compete, only two of them from the works team, and there were usually four or five at championship Grands Prix throughout that season. The firm built scores of cars for the lower formulae each year, peaking with 89 cars in 1966. Brabham had the reputation of providing customers with cars of a standard equal to those used by the works team, which worked "out of the box". The company provided a high degree of support to its customers—including Jack Brabham helping customers set up their cars. During this period the cars were usually known as "Repco Brabhams", not because of the Repco engines used in Formula One between 1966 and 1968, but because of a smaller-scale sponsorship deal through which the Australian company had been providing parts to Jack Brabham since his Cooper days.

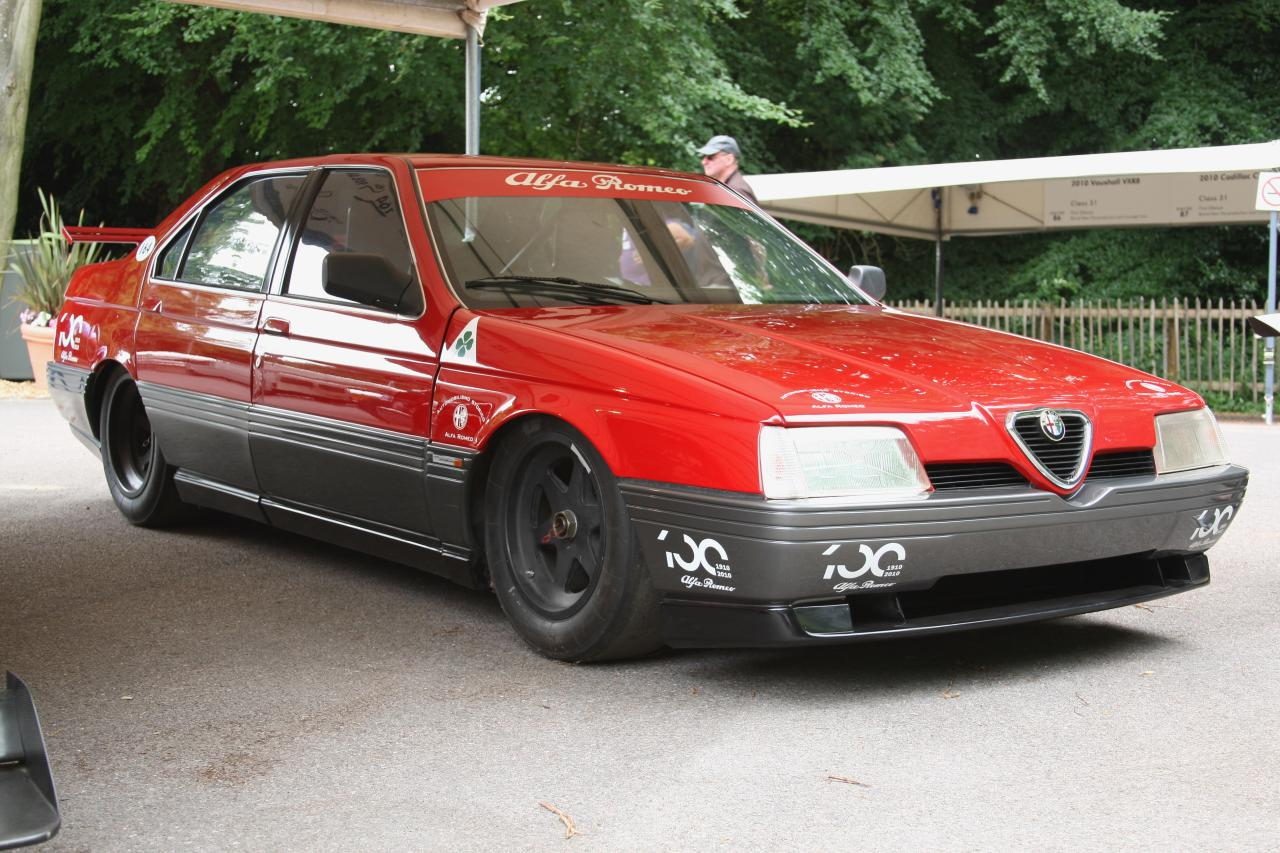
The Brabham Alfa Romeo 164 "procar" (1988)

At the end of 1971 Bernie Ecclestone bought MRD. He retained the Brabham brand, as did subsequent owners. Although the production of customer cars continued briefly under Ecclestone's ownership, he believed the company needed to focus on Formula One to succeed. The last production customer Brabhams were the Formula Two BT40 and the Formula Three BT41 of 1973, although Ecclestone sold ex-works Formula One BT44Bs to RAM Racing as late as 1976.

In 1988 Ecclestone sold Motor Racing Developments to Alfa Romeo. The Formula One team did not compete that year, but Alfa Romeo put the company to use designing and building a prototype "Procar"—a racing car with the silhouette of a large saloon (the Alfa Romeo 164) covering a composite racing car chassis and mid-mounted race engine. This was intended for a racing series for major manufacturers to support Formula One Grands Prix, and was designated the Brabham BT57.

== Racing history in other categories ==
=== IndyCar ===
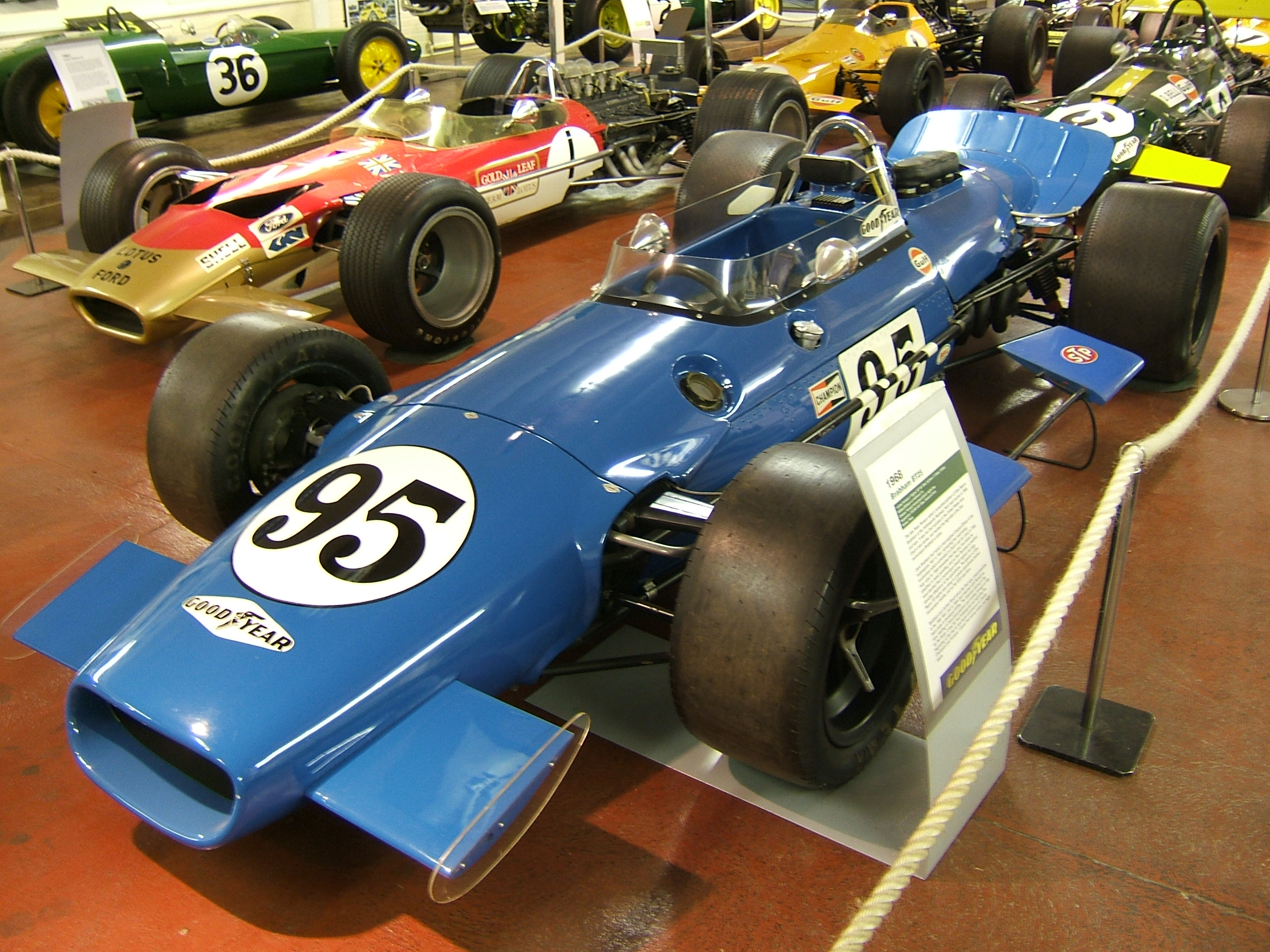
Brabham's last USAC race-winning car, the Brabham BT25 IndyCar of 1968

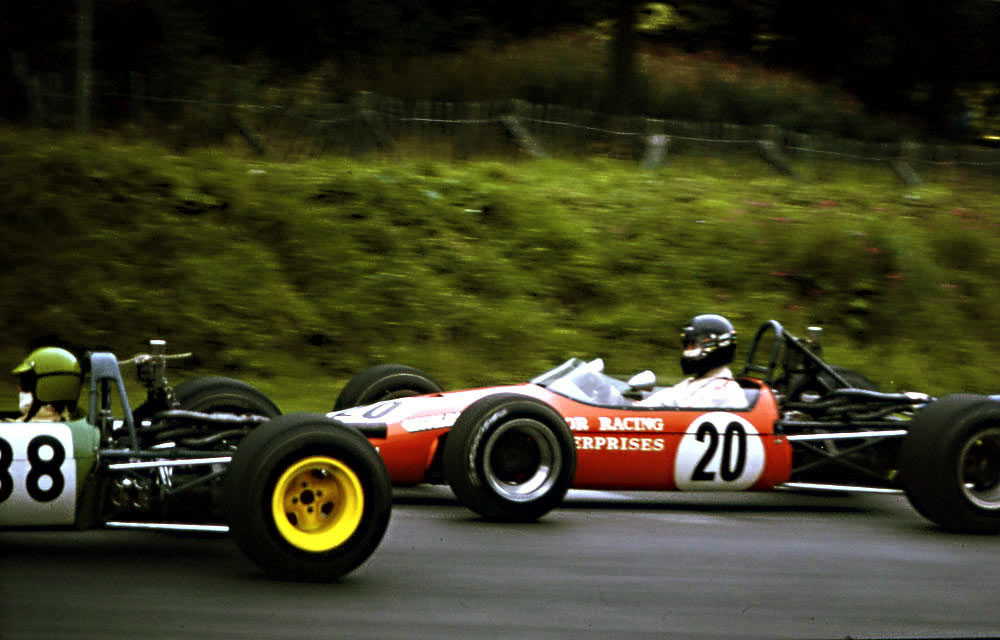
Top drivers used Brabham F3 cars in their early careers. (James Hunt, 1969)

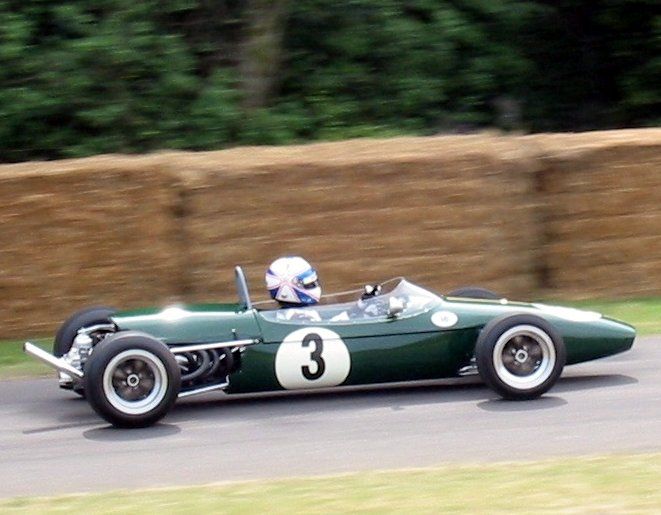
The Brabham BT18-Honda completely dominated Formula Two in 1966.

Brabham cars competed at the Indianapolis 500 from the mid-1960s to the early 1970s. After an abortive project in 1962, MRD was commissioned in 1964 to build an IndyCar chassis powered by an American Offenhauser engine. The resultant BT12 chassis was raced by Jack Brabham as the "Zink-Urschel Trackburner" at the 1964 event and retired with a fuel tank problem. The car was entered again in 1966, taking a third place for Jim McElreath. From 1968 to 1970, Brabham returned to Indianapolis, at first with a 4.2-litre version of the Repco V8 the team used in Formula One—with which Peter Revson finished fifth in 1969—before reverting to the Offenhauser engine for 1970. The Brabham-Offenhauser combination was entered again in 1971 by J.C. Agajanian, finishing fifth in the hands of Bill Vukovich II. Although no Brabham car ever won at Indianapolis, McElreath won four United States Automobile Club (USAC) races over 1965 and 1966 in the BT12. The "Dean Van Lines Special" in which Mario Andretti won the 1965 USAC national championship was a direct copy of this car, made with permission from Brabham by Andretti's crew chief Clint Brawner. Revson took Brabham's final USAC race win in a BT25 in 1969, using the Repco engine.

=== Formula Two ===
In the 1960s and early 1970s, drivers who had reached Formula One often continued to compete in Formula Two. In 1966 MRD produced the BT18 for the lower category, with a Honda engine acting as a stressed component. The car was extremely successful, winning 11 consecutive Formula Two races in the hands of the Formula One pairing of Brabham and Hulme. Cars were entered by MRD and not by the Brabham Racing Organisation, avoiding a direct conflict with Repco, their Formula One engine supplier.

=== Formula Three ===
The first Formula Three Brabham, the BT9, won only four major races in 1964. The BT15 which followed in 1965 was a highly successful design. 58 cars were sold, which won 42 major races. Further developments of the same concept, including wings by the end of the decade, were highly competitive up until 1971. The BT38C of 1972 was Brabham's first production monocoque and the first not designed by Tauranac. Although 40 were ordered, it was less successful than its predecessors. The angular BT41 was the final Formula Three Brabham.

=== Formula 5000 ===
Brabham made one car for Formula 5000 racing, the Brabham BT43. Rolled out in late 1973 it was tested in early 1974 by John Watson at Silverstone before making its debut at the Rothmans F5000 Championship Round at Monza on 30 June 1974, driven by Martin Birrane. Former Australian Drivers' Champion Kevin Bartlett used the Chevrolet powered Brabham BT43 to finish 3rd in the 1978 Australian Drivers' Championship including finishing 5th in the 1978 Australian Grand Prix.

=== Sports cars ===
Tauranac did not enjoy designing sports cars and could only spare a small amount of his time from MRD's very successful single-seater business. Only 14 sports car models were built between 1961 and 1972, out of a total production of almost 600 chassis. The BT8A was the only one built in any numbers, and was quite successful in national level racing in the UK in 1964 and 1965. The design was "stretched" in 1966 to become the one-off BT17, originally fitted with the 4.3-litre version of the Repco engine for Can-Am racing. It was quickly abandoned by MRD after engine reliability problems became evident.

== Technical innovation ==
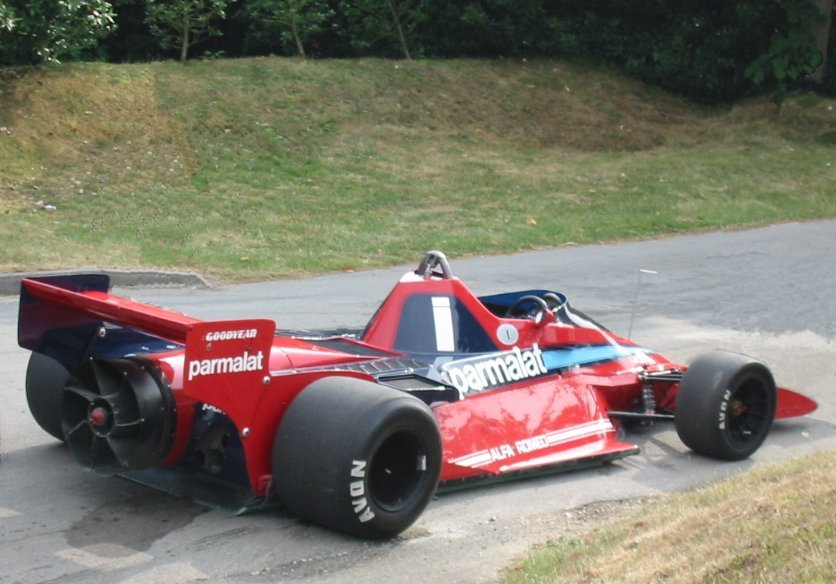
The 1978 BT46B "Fan car" won its only race before being banned. It was nicknamed the "Fan Car" due to the large fan at the rear of the car.

Brabham was considered a technically conservative team in the 1960s, chiefly because it persevered with traditional spaceframe cars long after Lotus introduced lighter, stiffer monocoque chassis to Formula One in 1962. Chief designer Tauranac reasoned that monocoques of the time were not usefully stiffer than well designed spaceframe chassis, and were harder to repair and less suitable for MRD's customers. His "old fashioned" cars won the Brabham team the 1966 and 1967 championships, and were competitive in Formula One until rule changes forced a move to monocoques in 1970.

Despite the perceived conservatism, in 1963 Brabham was the first Formula One team to use a wind tunnel to hone its designs to reduce drag and stop the cars lifting off the ground at speed. The practice became the norm in only the early 1980s, and is possibly the most important factor in the design of modern cars. Towards the end of the 1960s, teams began to exploit aerodynamic downforce to push the cars' tyres down harder on the track and enable them to maintain faster speeds through high-speed corners. At the 1968 Belgian Grand Prix, Brabham was the first, alongside Ferrari, to introduce full width rear wings to this effect.

The team's most fertile period of technical innovation came in the 1970s and 1980s when Gordon Murray became technical director. During 1976, the team introduced carbon-carbon brakes to Formula One, which promised reduced unsprung weight and better stopping performance due to carbon's greater coefficient of friction. The initial versions used carbon-carbon composite brake pads and a steel disc faced with carbon "pucks." The technology was not reliable at first; in 1976, Carlos Pace crashed at 180 mph (290 km/h) at the Österreichring circuit after heat build-up in the brakes boiled the brake fluid, leaving him with no way of stopping the car. By 1979, Brabham had developed an effective carbon-carbon braking system, combining structural carbon discs with carbon brake pads.

Although Brabham experimented with airdams and underbody skirts in the mid-1970s, the team, like the rest of the field, did not immediately understand Lotus's development of a ground effect car in 1977. The Brabham BT46B "Fan car" of 1978, generated enormous downforce with a fan, which sucked air from beneath the car, although its claimed use was for engine cooling. The car raced only once in the Formula One World Championship—Niki Lauda winning the 1978 Swedish Grand Prix—before a loophole in the regulations was closed by the FIA.

Although in 1979 Murray was the first to use lightweight carbon fibre composite panels to stiffen Brabham's aluminium alloy monocoques, he echoed his predecessor Tauranac in being the last to switch to the new fully composite monocoques. Murray was reluctant to build the entire chassis from composite materials until he understood their behaviour in a crash, an understanding achieved in part through an instrumented crash test of a BT49 chassis. The team did not follow McLaren's 1981 MP4/1 with its own fully composite chassis until the "lowline" BT55 in 1986, the last team to do so. This technology is now used in all top level single seater racing cars.

For the 1981 season the FIA introduced a 6 cm (2.4 in) minimum ride height for the cars, intended to slow them in corners by limiting the downforce created by aerodynamic ground effect. Gordon Murray devised a hydropneumatic suspension system for the BT49C, which allowed the car to settle to a much lower ride height at speed. Brabham was accused of cheating by other teams, although Murray believes that the system met the letter of the regulations. No action was taken against the team and others soon produced systems with similar effects.

At the 1982 British Grand Prix, Brabham reintroduced the idea of re-fuelling and changing the car's tyres during the race, unseen since the 1957 Formula One season, to allow its drivers to sprint away at the start of races on a light fuel load and soft tyres. After studying techniques used at the Indianapolis 500 and in NASCAR racing in the United States, the team was able to refuel and re-tyre the car in 14 seconds in tests ahead of the race. In 1982 Murray felt the tactic did little more than "get our sponsors noticed at races we had no chance of winning," but in 1983 the team made good use of the tactic. Refuelling was banned for 1984, although it reappeared between 1994 and 2009, but tyre changes have remained part of Formula One.

== Controversy ==
The fan car and hydropneumatic suspension exploited loopholes in the sporting regulations. In the early 1980s, Brabham was accused of going further and breaking the regulations. During 1981, Piquet's first championship year, rumours circulated of illegal underweight Brabham chassis. Driver Jacques Laffite was among those to claim that the cars were fitted with heavily ballasted bodywork before being weighed at scrutineering. The accusation was denied by Brabham's management. No formal protest was made against the team and no action was taken against it by the sporting authorities.

From 1978, Ecclestone was president of the Formula One Constructors Association (FOCA), a body formed by the teams to represent their interests. This left his team open to accusations of having advance warning of rule changes. Ecclestone denies that the team benefited from this and Murray has noted that, contrary to this view, at the end of 1982 the team had to abandon its new BT51 car, built on the basis that ground effect would be permitted in 1983. Brabham had to design and build a replacement, the BT52, in only three months. At the end of the 1983 season, Renault and Ferrari, both beaten to the Drivers' Championship by Piquet, protested that the Research Octane Number (RON) 102.4 of the team's fuel was above the legal limit of 102. The FIA declared that a figure of up to 102.9 was permitted under the rules, and that Brabham had not exceeded this limit.

== Later use of the Brabham name ==
=== Revival attempts ===
On 4 June 2009, Franz Hilmer confirmed that he had used the name to lodge an entry for the 2010 Formula One season as a cost-capped team under the new budget cap regulations. The Brabham family was not involved and announced that it was seeking legal advice over the use of the name. The team's entry was not accepted, and the Brabham family later obtained legal recognition of their exclusive rights to the Brabham brand.

=== Brabham Racing ===
In September 2014, David Brabham—the son of Brabham founder Sir Jack Brabham—announced the reformation of the Brabham Racing team under the name Project Brabham, with plans to enter the 2015 FIA World Endurance Championship and 2015 24 Hours of Le Mans in the LMP2 category using a crowdsourcing business model. The company also expressed interest in returning to Formula One, but did not have the financial capacity to do so.

In 2019, Brabham Automotive announced its goal to enter the 2021 FIA World Endurance Championship using a BT62 in the GTE class. The team competed in the 2019 GT Cup Championship. It also entered the final two races of the 2019 Britcar Endurance Championship, winning on its debut.

In 2021, Brabham Automotive debuted their BT63 GT2 car at the season finale of the 2021 GT2 European Series.

== Championship results ==
Results achieved by the "works" Brabham team. Bold results indicate a championship win.

Summary of Brabham Formula One World Championship results
Season	Entrant	Car	Tyres	Engine	Drivers	Constructors' Championship
1962	Brabham Racing Organisation	Lotus 24; Brabham BT3	D	Coventry Climax FWMV	Jack Brabham	7th (9 points)
1963	Brabham Racing Organisation	Brabham BT3; Brabham BT7; Lotus 25	D	Coventry Climax FWMV	Jack Brabham; Dan Gurney	3rd (28 points)
1964	Brabham Racing Organisation	Brabham BT7; Brabham BT11	D	Coventry Climax FWMV	Jack Brabham; Dan Gurney	4th (33 points)
1965	Brabham Racing Organisation	Brabham BT7; Brabham BT11	D G	Coventry Climax FWMV	Jack Brabham; Dan Gurney; Denny Hulme; Giancarlo Baghetti	3rd (27 pts)
1966	Brabham Racing Organisation	Brabham BT19; Brabham BT20; Brabham BT22	G	Repco 620; Coventry Climax FPF	Jack Brabham; Denny Hulme	Champion (42 pts)
1967	Brabham Racing Organisation	Brabham BT19; Brabham BT20; Brabham BT24	G	Repco 620; Repco 740	Jack Brabham; Denny Hulme	Champion (37 pts)
1968	Brabham Racing Organisation	Brabham BT24; Brabham BT26	G	Repco 740; Repco 860	Jack Brabham; Jochen Rindt; Dan Gurney	8th (10 pts)
1969	Motor Racing Developments	Brabham BT26A	G	Cosworth DFV	Jack Brabham; Jacky Ickx	2nd (51 pts)
1970	Motor Racing Developments	Brabham BT33	G	Cosworth DFV	Jack Brabham; Rolf Stommelen	4th (35 pts)
1971	Motor Racing Developments	Brabham BT33; Brabham BT34	G	Cosworth DFV	Graham Hill; Tim Schenken; Dave Charlton	9th (5 pts)
1972	Motor Racing Developments	Brabham BT33; Brabham BT34; Brabham BT37	G	Cosworth DFV	Graham Hill; Carlos Reutemann; Wilson Fittipaldi	9th (7 pts)
1973	Motor Racing Developments; Ceramica Pagnossin Team MRD	Brabham BT37; Brabham BT42	G	Cosworth DFV	Carlos Reutemann; Wilson Fittipaldi; Andrea de Adamich; Rolf Stommelen; John Watson	4th (49 pts)
1974	Motor Racing Developments	Brabham BT42; Brabham BT44	G	Cosworth DFV	Carlos Reutemann; Carlos Pace; Rikky von Opel; Richard Robarts; Teddy Pilette	5th (35 pts)
1975	Martini Racing	Brabham BT44B	G	Cosworth DFV	Carlos Reutemann; Carlos Pace	2nd (54 pts)
1976	Martini Racing	Brabham BT45	G	Alfa Romeo 115-12	Carlos Reutemann; Carlos Pace; Rolf Stommelen; Larry Perkins	9th (9 pts)
1977	Martini Racing	Brabham BT45B	G	Alfa Romeo 115-12	Carlos Pace; John Watson; Hans-Joachim Stuck; Giorgio Francia	5th (27 pts)
1978	Parmalat Racing Team	Brabham BT45C; Brabham BT46/B/C	G	Alfa Romeo 115-12	Niki Lauda; John Watson; Nelson Piquet	3rd (53 pts)
1979	Parmalat Racing Team	Brabham BT46; Brabham BT48; Brabham BT49	G	Alfa Romeo 115-12; Alfa Romeo 1260; Cosworth DFV	Niki Lauda; Nelson Piquet; Ricardo Zunino	8th (6 pts)
1980	Parmalat Racing Team	Brabham BT49/B	M	Cosworth DFV	Nelson Piquet; Ricardo Zunino; Héctor Rebaque	3rd (55 pts)
1981	Parmalat Racing Team	Brabham BT49/B/C	M G	Cosworth DFV	Nelson Piquet; Héctor Rebaque; Ricardo Zunino	2nd (61 pts)
1982	Parmalat Racing Team	Brabham BT49D; Brabham BT50	G	Cosworth DFV; BMW M12/13	Nelson Piquet; Riccardo Patrese	5th (41 pts)
1983	Fila Sport	Brabham BT52/B	M	BMW M12/13	Nelson Piquet; Riccardo Patrese	3rd (72 pts)
1984	MRD International	Brabham BT53	M	BMW M12/13	Nelson Piquet; Teo Fabi; Corrado Fabi; Manfred Winkelhock	4th (38 pts)
1985	Motor Racing Developments Ltd	Brabham BT54	P	BMW M12/13	Nelson Piquet; Marc Surer; François Hesnault	5th (26 pts)
1986	Motor Racing Developments Ltd	Brabham BT54; Brabham BT55	P	BMW M12/13/1	Elio de Angelis; Riccardo Patrese; Derek Warwick	9th (2 pts)
1987	Motor Racing Developments Ltd	Brabham BT56	G	BMW M12/13/1	Riccardo Patrese; Andrea de Cesaris; Stefano Modena	8th (10 pts)
1989	Motor Racing Developments	Brabham BT58	P	Judd EV	Martin Brundle; Stefano Modena	9th (8 pts)
1990	Motor Racing Developments	Brabham BT58; Brabham BT59	P	Judd EV	Stefano Modena; David Brabham; Gregor Foitek	10th (2 pts)
1991	Motor Racing Developments Ltd	Brabham BT59Y; Brabham BT60Y	P	Yamaha OX99	Martin Brundle; Mark Blundell	9th (3 pts)
1992	Motor Racing Developments Ltd	Brabham BT60B	G	Judd GV	Eric van de Poele; Giovanna Amati; Damon Hill	NC (0 pts)

== See also ==
- List of Brabham racing cars

== Footnotes ==
Sporting positions
Preceded by Lotus	Formula One Constructors' Champion; 1966–1967	Succeeded by Lotus
