= José María Vernet =

Argentine politician (1944–2024)

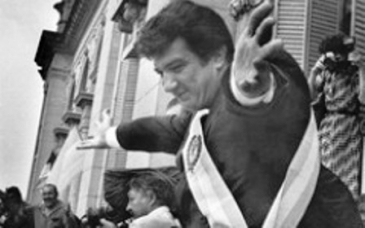

Ministry of Foreign Affairs, International Trade and Worship
- In office 23 December 2001 – 2 January 2002
- President: Adolfo Rodríguez Saá
- Preceded by: Adalberto Rodríguez Giavarini
- Succeeded by: Carlos Ruckauf

Governor of Santa Fe Province
- In office 11 December 1983 – 11 December 1987
- Preceded by: Héctor Salvi
- Succeeded by: Víctor Reviglio

Personal details
- Born: 24 February 1944 Rosario, Santa Fe Province, Argentina
- Died: 23 February 2024 (aged 79) Funes, Santa Fe Province, Argentina
- Party: Justicialist
- Education: National University of Córdoba
- Occupation: Accountant

José María Vernet (24 February 1944 – 23 February 2024) was an Argentine politician of the Justicialist Party. He served as Governor of Santa Fe from 1983 to 1987.

== Life and career ==
Vernet was born in Rosario on 24 February 1944. He enrolled at the National University of Córdoba, and earned a degree in Accountancy.

Vernet would obtain the Justicialist Party's nomination for Governor of Santa Fe as a compromise candidate chosen by feuding Peronist factions ahead of elections in 1983. Elected in October, his margin of victory was the closest of the 22 gubernatorial races that year, defeating UCR candidate Aníbal Reinaldo by around 15,000 votes, or 1%. The computerized tallying system failed during a recount of the close election, and Peronist officials themselves later acknowledged the possibility that Reinaldo would have prevailed by 12,000 votes.

Governor Vernet's tenure was highlighted by his efforts to decentralize the provincial bureaucratic and judicial systems, establishing a network of municipal courts throughout the province. He did likewise with a variety of public services, transferring numerous local utilities and public housing communities from the provincial aegis to cooperatives based in each town.

Vernet established a number of new offices, however, including the Ministry of Production, Commerce and Industry and Commerce; the Plan Lote and Proyecto Sol poverty relief programs; and EMPA, an adult education and job training service. He commemorated the bicentennial of early provincial leader Estanislao López in 1986 by establishing the Cuerpo de Dragones de la Independencia, an honor guard of the Provincial Police.

Vernet was elected First Vice President of the Justicialist Party in 1984. Vernet's tenure as governor became known as the "Peronist Cooperative" for the unwieldy coalition he secured between his wing of the Justicialist Party (dominated by Steelworkers Union leader Lorenzo Miguel), and other factions in the big tent party. Vernet faced mounting criticism for the increase in public spending toward the end of his term. Following the end of his term in 1987, his fellow Peronist successor, Víctor Reviglio, advanced numerous investigations of provincial government officials in Vernet's administration. Vernet, who had left office with high approval ratings, lost much of his earlier popularity within a year. He summarized the conflictive nature of provincial politics by remarking that, as Santa Fe governors are limited to one consecutive term, "it would be as awkward to oppose a governor during the first two years, as it would to support him during the last two years." The 1985 comment would later be known in Santa Fe as "Vernet's Theorem."

Vernet later relocated to Mar del Plata, and was appointed Minister of Production of by the Governor of Buenos Aires, Antonio Cafiero. He was appointed to a minor post by Interior Minister Carlos Corach in the 1990s, and served as Minister of Foreign Relations for ad interim president Adolfo Rodríguez Saá during his very brief rule in the last week of 2001, immediately after the December 2001 riots and the resignation of Fernando de la Rúa.

The presidential candidate on the Federal Commitment ticket in 2011, Alberto Rodríguez Saá, nominated the former governor as his running mate; they obtained fourth place.

Vernet died on 23 February 2024, at the age of 79.

Preceded by Héctor Salvi	Governor of Santa Fe; 1983–1987	Succeeded by Víctor Reviglio
