= Brabham BT34 =

Formula One racing car

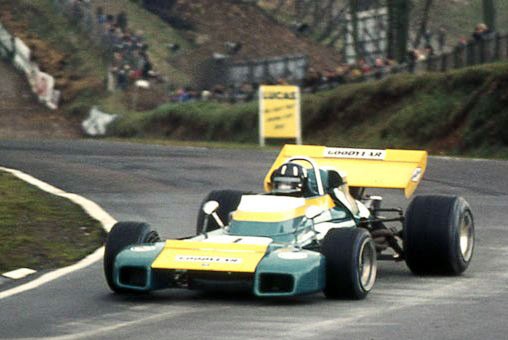
- Graham Hill in the BT34, 1971 Race of Champions at Brands Hatch
- Category: Formula One
- Constructor: Brabham
- Designer: Ron Tauranac
- Predecessor: BT33
- Successor: BT37

Technical specifications
- Chassis: Aluminium monocoque.
- Axle track: Front: 1,600 mm (63 in); Rear: 1,626 mm (64.0 in)
- Wheelbase: 2,413 mm (95.0 in)
- Engine: Ford-Cosworth DFV 2,993 cc (182.6 cu in) 90° V8, naturally aspirated, mid-mounted.
- Transmission: Hewland 5-speed manual gearbox.
- Weight: 550 kg (1,213 lb)
- Fuel: Esso
- Tyres: Goodyear

Competition history
- Notable entrants: Motor Racing Developments
- Notable drivers: (United Kingdom) Graham Hill (Argentina) Carlos Reutemann (Brazil) Wilson Fittipaldi
- Debut: 1971 South African Grand Prix
Races	Wins	Podiums	Poles	F/Laps
20	0	0	1	0
- Constructors' Championships: 0
- Drivers' Championships: 0

The Brabham BT34 was a Formula One racing car designed by Ron Tauranac, and used by Brabham during part of the 1971 and 1972 Formula One seasons.

== Development ==
In 1971, Jack Brabham sold his share of the team to co-owner and designer Ron Tauranac. Englishman Graham Hill was signed to drive the BT34 and Tauranac also signed Australian Tim Schenken to drive the older Brabham BT33. Tauranac designed the BT34, which was nicknamed the 'lobster claw', as derived from its twin radiators (claw) mounted ahead of the front wheels. Only one BT34 was built for Hill.

== Racing history ==
=== 1971 ===
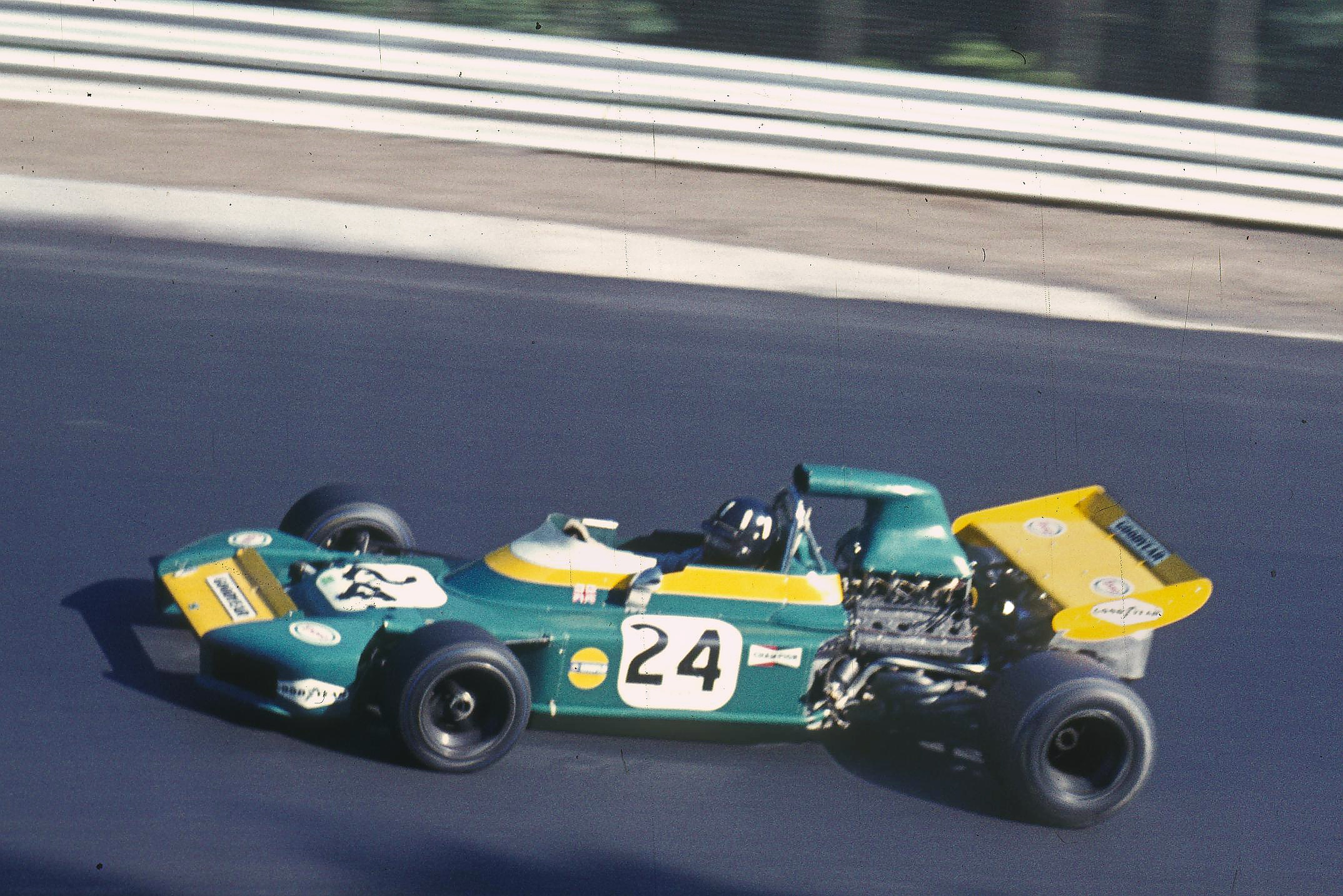
Graham Hill driving the Brabham BT34 at the Nürburgring in 1971

Brabham used the BT33 in the 1971 South African Grand Prix. The BT34 made its debut at Spain, and Hill retired with steering issues. The Englishman crashed at the Monaco Grand Prix. Hill finished tenth at Holland and retired at the French Grand Prix with a broken oil pipe. The start of Britain was a shambles, with a bungled flag drop causing a crash between Hill and Jackie Oliver (McLaren), for which Oliver was fined £50. Hill finished ninth at the German Grand Prix. Hill finished fifth at Austria and retired at the Italian Grand Prix with a broken gearbox. Hill crashed at a wet race in Canada. The Englishman finished seventh at the United States Grand Prix.

Brabham finished the season in ninth place in the Constructors' Championship, with five points, scored by Schenken in the Brabham BT33. Only a team's best place finish in any one race counted towards the constructors' championship. Hill's fifth place at the Austrian Grand Prix did not count towards the final points total as Schenken finished third.

At the end of the year, Tauranac, an engineer by choice, started to feel his Formula One budget of £100,000 was a risk he could not afford to take on his own and searched around for an experienced business partner. He sold Brabham for £100,000 at the end of the year to Bernie Ecclestone, former manager of Jochen Rindt and former owner of Connaught Engineering. Tauranac stayed on to design the cars and run the factory.

=== 1972 ===
Tauranac left the Brabham team in early 1972 after Ecclestone changed the way Brabham was organised without letting him know. Ecclestone said, "In retrospect, the relationship was never going to work", noting that "[Ron Tauranac and I] both took the view: 'Please be reasonable, do this my way'". The 1972 season was disappointing, despite the team running three different cars, the BT33, BT34 and BT37.

Brabham replaced Schenken with Argentinian Carlos Reutemann for 1972. Hill remained with the team, but Brabham put the Argentinian in the BT34. The 1972 Argentine Grand Prix saw Reutemann take pole in his first grand prix but finish seventh. The Argentinian retired from South Africa with fuel system failure. Reutemann broke his ankle after a mechanical failure on his Rondel Racing entered Brabham at Thruxton during a Formula Two race. The BT34 was not used at the Spanish and Monaco Grands Prix. For Belgium, Brabham entered a third car for Brazilian Wilson Fittipaldi, but he retired with a broken gearbox. The Brazilian finished eighth at the French Grand Prix. Fittipaldi finished 12th at Britain despite having stopped the car on lap 69 with broken suspension. The Brazilian finished seventh at the German Grand Prix. Fittipaldi retired from the final four races of the year, brake failure at Austria, broken suspension in Italy, broken gearbox at Canada and engine failure at the United States.

The Brabham team had scored seven World Championship points, four by Hill and three by Reutemann, earning them ninth place in the Constructors' Championship for the second season running.

The BT34 was replaced by the Brabham BT37 for the 1973 season.

== Complete Formula One World Championship results ==
Points for the 1971 and 1972 International Cup for F1 Manufacturers were awarded on a 9–6–4–3–2–1 basis to the top six finishers in each race. Only the best placed car from each manufacturer was eligible to score points. For classification, only the best five results from the first half of the season and the best five results from the second half of the season could be retained.

(key)(results in bold indicate pole position)

Year	Entrant	Engine	Tyres	Drivers	1	2	3	4	5	6	7	8	9	10	11	12	Points	WCC
1971	Motor Racing Developments	Ford Cosworth DFV 3.0 V8	**G**		RSA	ESP	MON	NED	FRA	GBR	GER	AUT	ITA	CAN	USA		**5**^{1}	**9th**^{1}
1971	Motor Racing Developments	Ford Cosworth DFV 3.0 V8	**G**	Graham Hill		Ret	Ret	10	Ret	Ret	9	5	Ret	Ret	7		**5**^{1}	**9th**^{1}
1972	Motor Racing Developments	Ford Cosworth DFV 3.0 V8	**G**		ARG	RSA	ESP	MON	BEL	FRA	GBR	GER	AUT	ITA	CAN	USA	**7**^{2}	**9th**^{2}
1972	Motor Racing Developments	Ford Cosworth DFV 3.0 V8	**G**	Carlos Reutemann	**7**	Ret											**7**^{2}	**9th**^{2}
1972	Motor Racing Developments	Ford Cosworth DFV 3.0 V8	**G**	Wilson Fittipaldi					Ret	8	12	7	Ret	Ret	Ret	Ret	**7**^{2}	**9th**^{2}

^1 This total includes points scored by the Brabham BT33.
^2 All points scored by the Brabham BT33 and Brabham BT37.

== Non-Championship Formula One results ==
(key) (Races in bold indicate pole position) (Races in italics indicate fastest lap)

Year	Entrant	Engines	Tyres	Drivers	1	2	3	4	5	6	7	8
1971	Motor Racing Developments	Ford Cosworth DFV 3.0 V8	**G**		ARG	ROC	QUE	SPR	INT	RIN	OUL	VIC
1971	Motor Racing Developments	Ford Cosworth DFV 3.0 V8	**G**	Graham Hill		Ret	26		1			8
1972	Motor Racing Developments	Ford Cosworth DFV 3.0 V8	**G**		ROC	BRA	INT	OUL	REP	VIC		
1972	Motor Racing Developments	Ford Cosworth DFV 3.0 V8	**G**	Carlos Reutemann		1						
