= Brabham BT33 =

Formula One racing car

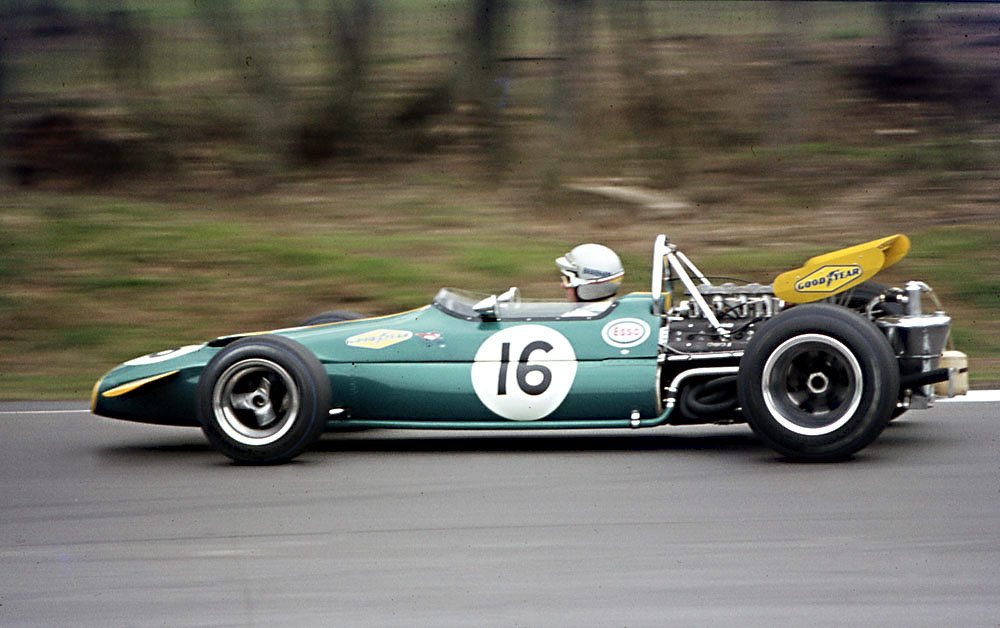
- Jack Brabham in the BT33 at the 1970 Race of Champions
- Category: Formula One
- Constructor: Motor Racing Developments
- Designer: Ron Tauranac
- Predecessor: Brabham BT26
- Successor: Brabham BT34

Technical specifications
- Chassis: Steel monocoque
- Suspension (front): Double wishbones, inboard coil springs over dampers, anti-roll bar
- Suspension (rear): Double wishbones, twin radius arms, coil springs over dampers, anti-roll bar
- Engine: Cosworth DFV; 2,993 cc (182.6 cu in) 90° V8, NA, mid-engine, longitudinally mounted
- Transmission: Hewland DG 300 5-speed manual, ZF differential
- Fuel: Esso
- Tyres: Goodyear, Firestone

Competition history
- Notable entrants: Brabham Racing Organisation
- Notable drivers: (Australia) Jack Brabham (Germany) Rolf Stommelen (Australia) Tim Schenken (United Kingdom) Graham Hill
- Debut: 1970 South African Grand Prix
Races	Wins	Poles	F/Laps
28	1	2	3
- Constructors' Championships: 0
- Drivers' Championships: 0

The Brabham BT33 was a Formula One racing car built for the 1970 F1 season. It was Ron Tauranac's first F1 monocoque design. After a promising start to the season, including a first-race pole and win at the South African Grand Prix, it faded somewhat and ultimately finished fourth in the World Constructors Championship, with drivers Jack Brabham and Rolf Stommelen finishing sixth and eleventh respectively in the Driver's Championship.

== Concept ==
Designed by Ron Tauranac, the BT33 was his first monocoque F1 car, a change partly forced on him by regulation changes regarding fuel cells which the spaceframe chassis could not accommodate. Apart from the chassis, the design incorporated many elements of the previous season's BT26A, although the front coil-over dampers were moved inboard.

== Racing history ==
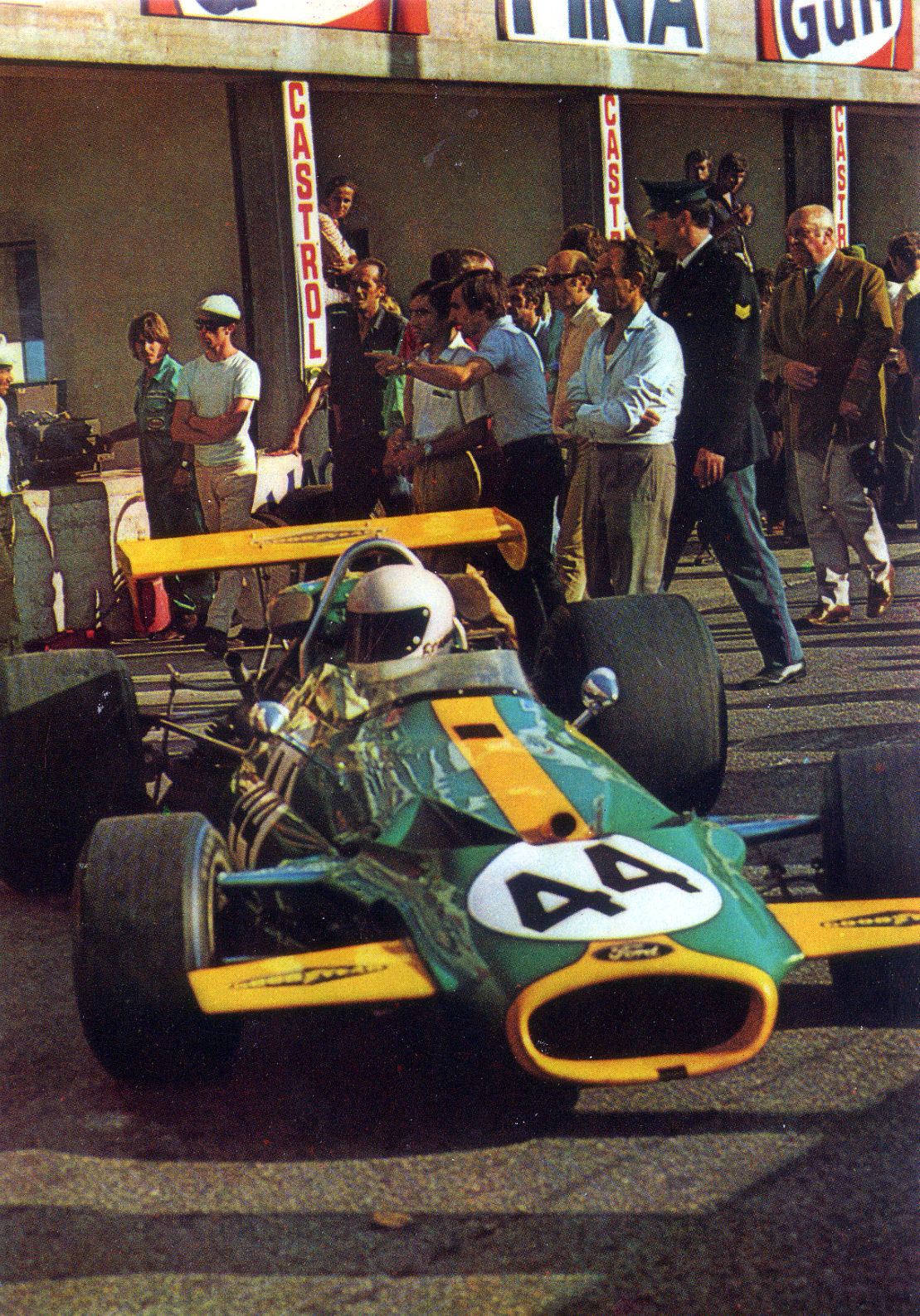
Jack Brabham in the BT33 at the 1970 Italian Grand Prix

In 1970 Jack Brabham managed only one win, in the season opener in South Africa, with only three other points finishes that year. He did set one other pole position, and two fastest laps. Team mate Rolf Stommelen also had four points finishes, his best result being third in Austria.

1971 and 1972 saw the BT33 playing second string to the BT34 and BT37, picking up only two championship points over the two seasons.

Its final World Championship race was the 1972 Monaco Grand Prix where Wilson Fittipaldi finished in ninth place.

In non-championship races, the best results were two wins in the 1972 South African F2 Championship, achieved by John Love.

== Complete Formula One World Championship results ==
(key) (results in bold indicate pole position; results in italics indicate fastest lap)

Year	Entrant	Engine	Tyres	Driver	1	2	3	4	5	6	7	8	9	10	11	12	13	Points^{1}	WCC^{1}
1970	Brabham Racing Organisation	Cosworth DFV	G		RSA	ESP	MON	BEL	NED	FRA	GBR	GER	AUT	ITA	CAN	USA	MEX	**35**	4th
1970	Brabham Racing Organisation	Cosworth DFV	G	Jack Brabham	**1**	**Ret**	2	Ret	11	3	2	Ret	13	Ret	Ret	10	Ret	**35**	4th
1970	Brabham Racing Organisation	Cosworth DFV	G	Rolf Stommelen	Ret	Ret	DNQ	5	DNQ	7	DNS	5	3	5	Ret	12	Ret	**35**	4th
1971	Brabham Racing Organisation	Cosworth DFV	G		RSA	ESP	MON	NED	FRA	GBR	GER	AUT	ITA	CAN	USA			**5**^{2}	9th
1971	Brabham Racing Organisation	Cosworth DFV	G	Graham Hill	9													**5**^{2}	9th
1971	Brabham Racing Organisation	Cosworth DFV	G	Tim Schenken		9	10	Ret	12	12	6	3	Ret	Ret	Ret			**5**^{2}	9th
1971	Ecurie Everegreen	Cosworth DFV	G	Chris Craft										DNQ	Ret			**5**^{2}	9th
1971	Scribante Lucky Strike Racing	Cosworth DFV	G	Dave Charlton	Ret													**5**^{2}	9th
1972	Brabham Racing Organisation	Cosworth DFV	G		ARG	RSA	ESP	MON	BEL	FRA	GBR	GER	AUT	ITA	CAN	USA		**7**^{3}	9th
1972	Brabham Racing Organisation	Cosworth DFV	G	Graham Hill	Ret	6												**7**^{3}	9th
1972	Brabham Racing Organisation	Cosworth DFV	G	Wilson Fittipaldi			7	9										**7**^{3}	9th
1972	Team Gunston	Cosworth DFV	F	William Ferguson		DNS												**7**^{3}	9th

^{1} Points were awarded on a 9–6–4–3–2–1 basis to the first six finishers at each round, but only the best placed car for each make was eligible to score points. The best six results from the first seven and five from the last six counted in 1970, the best five from the first six and four from the last five in 1971 and the best five from the first six and five from the last six in 1972.
^{2} Includes points scored using the Brabham BT34
^{3} Includes points scored using the Brabham BT37.
