= Víctor Reviglio =

Argentine politician and diplomat

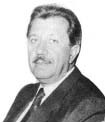
Victor Reviglio

Víctor Félix Reviglio (born 4 April 1938) is an Argentine Justicialist Party politician and diplomat. He was the governor of the province of Santa Fe from 11 December 1987 to 11 December 1991.

Reviglio qualified as a doctor at the National University of Córdoba. In 1973 he became undersecretary of public health of Santa Fe Province, taking a national position in 1975 as national director of medical attention. He returned to the Province in 1983 to be Minister of Health, Environment and Social Action.

Reviglio won the governorship by a wide margin over Radical Civic Union candidate Luis Cáceres in 1987. He served as Argentine Ambassador to Nicaragua under President Carlos Menem from 1992 until 1997, and was Minister of Health in the short-lived presidency of Adolfo Rodríguez Saá.

Political offices
Preceded by José María Vernet	Governor of Santa Fe; 1987–1991	Succeeded by Carlos Reutemann
