= Geoff Lees (racing driver) =

British racing driver (born 1951)

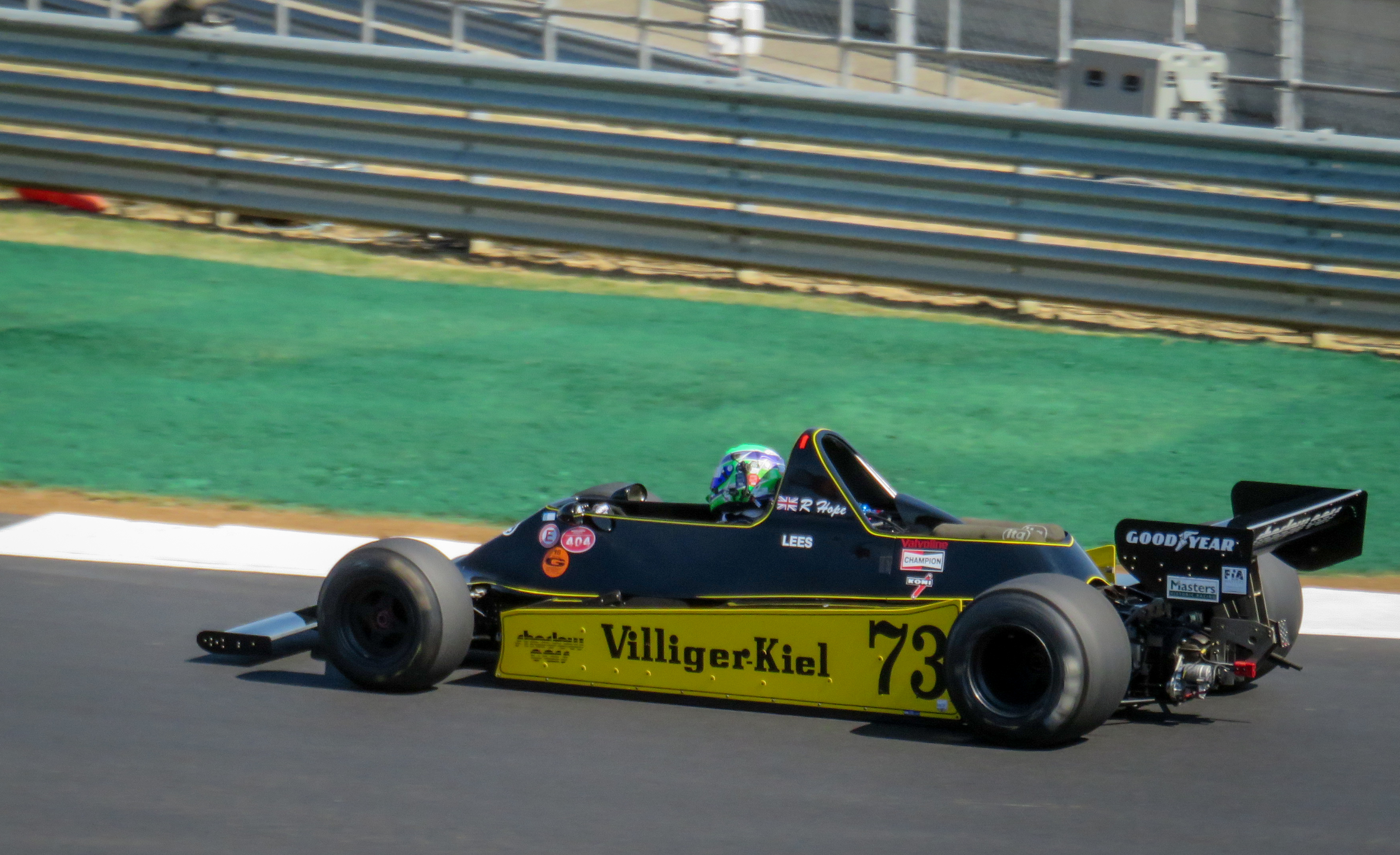
- Lees' Shadow DN11 at the 2018 British Grand Prix
- Born: Geoffrey Thompson Lees; 1 May 1951 (age 75); Kingsbury, Warwickshire, England

Formula One World Championship career
- Nationality: (United Kingdom) British
- Active years: 1978–1980, 1982
- Team(s): Tyrrell, Ensign, Shadow, RAM, Theodore, Lotus
- Entries: 12 (5 starts)
- Championships: 0
- Wins: 0
- Podiums: 0
- Career points: 0
- Pole positions: 0
- Fastest laps: 0
- First entry: 1978 British Grand Prix
- Last entry: 1982 French Grand Prix

Geoffrey Thompson Lees (born 1 May 1951) is a British former racing driver from England. He participated in 12 Formula One World Championship Grands Prix, making his first appearance on 16 July 1978. He scored no championship points.

== Career ==
Lees was born near Kingsbury, Warwickshire. His first Grand Prix chance came with a non-works Ensign run by Mario Deliotti, the owner of an Alfa Romeo dealership in Birmingham, at his home race in 1978. Lees failed to qualify. The following year he had a one-off drive for Tyrrell, while also competing in America in the Can-Am Challenge for the VDS team. Before a more regular ride with the struggling Shadow team in 1980. Later that year he also drove for the works Ensign team, and failed to qualify a RAM-entered Williams in the US. He participated in the Formula One non-championship race held on 7 February 1981 at Kyalami for Theodore where he went into the crash barriers on lap 11 due to a broken front suspension. In the hope of taking one step backward and then two steps forward, he joined Ralt-Honda for the European Formula Two championship. He won the championship, but his hopes of "re-entering Formula One with more dignity" were quashed when Honda decided to spend another year developing their F1 engine. Lees, one year ahead of Honda, failed to find a good seat at the highest level, and his F1 career petered out in 1982 with single drives for Theodore and Lotus.

In his Formula One career, Lees seemed stuck in uncompetitive cars, and when success proved elusive, he moved to Japan in the early 1980s. There he enjoyed a long career in the Japanese Formula Two, winning the 1983 title and collecting eight wins. He also represented various Japanese marques in sports car racing championships such as the Fuji Grand Champion Series, where he won three titles in 1986, 1988 and 1989, and the All Japan Sports Prototype Championship, where he got the C-class title in 1992. Lees became a highly paid and highly respected part of the Japanese racing scene. He has also driven at Le Mans numerous times, with his best finish being a sixth place overall in 1990.

== Racing record ==
=== Complete British Saloon Car Championship results ===
(key) (Races in bold indicate pole position; races in italics indicate fastest lap.)

Year	Team	Car	Class	1	2	3	4	5	6	7	8	9	10	DC	Pts	Class
1976	British Leyland	Triumph Dolomite Sprint	C	BRH	SIL	OUL	THR	THR	SIL	BRH	MAL; 9†	SNE	BRH; Ret	38th	3	10th

=== Complete European Formula Two Championship results ===
(key) (Races in bold indicate pole position; races in italics indicate fastest lap)

Year	Entrant	Chassis	Engine	1	2	3	4	5	6	7	8	9	10	11	12	Pos.	Pts
1978	Polifac BMW Junior Team	March 782	BMW	THR	HOC	NÜR	PAU	MUG	VLL	ROU	DON; Ret					14th	4
1978	Raven Racing	Chevron B42	Hart									NOG; 6	PER; DNQ	MIS; 4	HOC; Ret	14th	4
1980	Ralt Racing	Ralt RH6/80	Honda	THR	HOC	NÜR	VLL	PAU	SIL	ZOL	MUG	ZAN	PER	MIS	HOC; Ret	NC	0
1981	Ralt Racing	Ralt RH6/81	Honda	SIL; 7	**HOC**; 5	THR; NC	NÜR; 5	VLL; 5	MUG; 2	PAU; 1	PER; Ret	SPA; 1	DON; 1	MIS; 2	MAN; 2	**1st**	**51**

=== Complete Formula One World Championship results ===
(key)

Year	Entrant	Chassis	Engine	1	2	3	4	5	6	7	8	9	10	11	12	13	14	15	16	WDC	Pts
1978	Mario Deliotti Racing	Ensign N175	Ford Cosworth DFV 3.0 V8	ARG	BRA	RSA	USW	MON	BEL	ESP	SWE	FRA	GBR; DNQ	GER	AUT	NED	ITA	USA	CAN	NC	0
1979	Candy Tyrrell Team	Tyrrell 009	Ford Cosworth DFV 3.0 V8	ARG	BRA	RSA	USW	ESP	BEL	MON	FRA	GBR	GER; 7	AUT	NED	ITA	CAN	USA		NC	0
1980	Shadow Cars	Shadow DN11	Ford Cosworth DFV 3.0 V8	ARG	BRA	RSA; 13	USW; DNQ													NC	0
1980	Shadow Cars	Shadow DN12	Ford Cosworth DFV 3.0 V8					BEL; DNQ												NC	0
1980	Theodore Shadow	Shadow DN12	Ford Cosworth DFV 3.0 V8						MON; DNQ	FRA; DNQ	GBR	GER	AUT							NC	0
1980	Unipart Racing Team	Ensign N180	Ford Cosworth DFV 3.0 V8											NED; Ret	ITA; DNQ	CAN				NC	0
1980	RAM Racing	Williams FW07B	Ford Cosworth DFV 3.0 V8														USA; DNQ			NC	0
1982	Theodore Racing Team	Theodore TY02	Ford Cosworth DFV 3.0 V8	RSA	BRA	USW	SMR	BEL	MON	DET	CAN; Ret	NED	GBR							NC	0
1982	John Player Team Lotus	Lotus 91	Ford Cosworth DFV 3.0 V8											FRA; 12	GER	AUT	SUI	ITA	CPL	NC	0

=== Complete Formula One Non-championship results ===
(key)

Year	Entrant	Chassis	Engine	1
1980	Theodore Shadow	Shadow DN12	Ford Cosworth DFV 3.0 V8	ESP; Ret
1981	Theodore Racing Team	Theodore TR2	Ford Cosworth DFV 3.0 V8	RSA; Ret

=== Complete British Formula One Championship results ===
(key) (Races in bold indicate pole position; races in italics indicate fastest lap)

Year	Entrant	Chassis	Engine	1	2	3	4	5	6	7	8	9	10	11	12	13	14	15	Pos.	Points
1979	Theodore Racing	Wolf WR4	Ford Cosworth DFV 3.0 V8	ZOL	OUL	BRH	MAL	SNE	THR	ZAN	DON	OUL	NOG	MAL	BRH	THR	SNE	SIL; 3	14	4

=== Japanese Formula Two/Formula 3000 Championship results ===
(key)

Year	Entrant	1	2	3	4	5	6	7	8	9	10	11	DC	Points
1981	Ralt Honda	SUZ	SUZ	SUZ	SUZ	SUZ; 4							12nd	10
1982	Team LeMans	SUZ	FUJ	SUZ; 9	SUZ; 4	SUZ	SUZ						10th	12
1983	John Player Special Team Izukawa	SUZ; 6	FUJ; 4	SUZ; 1	SUZ; 7	SUZ; 1	**FUJ**; 1	SUZ; 5	SUZ; 1				**1st**	**93**
1984	Advan Sports Speed Box Motor Sports	SUZ; Ret	FUJ; Ret	MIN; Ret	SUZ; 12	SUZ; 8	FUJ; 4	SUZ; 4	SUZ; 6				9th	29
1985	Advan Sports Speed Box Motor Sports	SUZ; Ret	FUJ; Ret	MIN; 3	SUZ; 11	SUZ; 6	FUJ; Ret	SUZ; 3	SUZ; 3				6th	42
1986	Mooncraft	**SUZ**; Ret	FUJ; 1	MIN; 3	SUZ; 3	SUZ; 4	FUJ; 4	SUZ; 10	**SUZ**; 2				**3rd**	**80**
1987	Team Nova	**SUZ**; 10	FUJ; 1	**MIN**; 5	**SUZ**; 2	**SUZ**; 3	**SUG**; 2	**FUJ**; 12	**SUZ**; 3	SUZ; Ret			**3rd**	**83**
1988	Team LeMans	SUZ; 4	FUJ; 13	MIN; 4	SUZ; Ret	SUG; 1	**FUJ**; Ret	SUZ; Ret	SUZ; Ret				5th	15
1989	Team LeMans	SUZ; 4	FUJ; 14	MIN; Ret	SUZ; 15	SUG; 5	FUJ; Ret	SUZ; 13	SUZ; Ret				13th	5
1990	Team Hayashi	SUZ	FUJ	MIN	SUZ	SUG	FUJ	FUJ	SUZ	FUJ	SUZ; Ret		NC	0
1991	Team Hayashi	SUZ; 14	AUT; 18	FUJ; 13	MIN; 11	SUZ; 6	SUG; Ret	FUJ; DNQ	SUZ; 8	FUJ; C	SUZ; DNQ	FUJ; Ret	22nd	2

=== 24 Hours of Le Mans results ===
Year	Team	Co-Drivers	Car	Class	Laps	Pos.	Class Pos.
1982	(United Kingdom) Nimrod Racing Automobiles Ltd.	(United Kingdom) Tiff Needell (United Kingdom) Bob Evans	Nimrod NRA/C2-Aston Martin	C	55	DNF	DNF
1985	(Japan) Dome Team	(Sweden) Eje Elgh (Japan) Toshio Suzuki	Dome 85C-L-Toyota	C1	141	DNF	DNF
1986	(Japan) Tom's Co. Ltd.	(Japan) Satoru Nakajima (Japan) Masanori Sekiya	Tom's (Dome) 86C-L-Toyota	C1	105	DNF	DNF
1987	(Japan) Toyota Team Tom's	(Australia) Alan Jones (Sweden) Eje Elgh	Toyota 87C-L	C1	19	DNF	DNF
1988	(Japan) Toyota Team Tom's	(Japan) Masanori Sekiya (Japan) Kaoru Hoshino	Toyota 88C	C1	351	12th	12th
1989	(Japan) Toyota Team Tom's	(United Kingdom) Johnny Dumfries (United Kingdom) John Watson	Toyota 89C-V	C1	58	DNF	DNF
1990	(Japan) Toyota Team Tom's	(Japan) Masanori Sekiya (Japan) Hitoshi Ogawa	Toyota 90C-V	C1	347	6th	6th
1992	(Japan) Toyota Team Tom's	(Australia) David Brabham (Japan) Ukyo Katayama	Toyota TS010	C1	192	DNF	DNF
1993	(Japan) Toyota Team Tom's	(Netherlands) Jan Lammers (Argentina) Juan Manuel Fangio II	Toyota TS010	C1	353	8th	5th
1995	(United Kingdom) Lister Cars Ltd.	(United Kingdom) Dominic Chappell (United Kingdom) Rupert Keegan	Lister Storm GTS	GT1	40	DNF	DNF
1996	(United Kingdom) Newcastle United Lister	(United Kingdom) Tiff Needell (United Kingdom) Anthony Reid	Lister Storm GTS	GT1	295	19th	11th
1997	(United Kingdom) Newcastle United Lister	(United Kingdom) Tiff Needell (South Africa) George Fouché	Lister Storm GTL	GT1	21	DNF	DNF
1998	(Japan) Toyota Motorsport (Germany) Toyota Team Europe	(Belgium) Thierry Boutsen (Germany) Ralf Kelleners	Toyota GT-One	GT1	330	DNF	DNF
2000	(Germany) Thomas Bscher Promotion (United Kingdom) David Price Racing	(Germany) Dr. Thomas Bscher (France) Jean-Marc Gounon	BMW V12 LM	LMP900	180	DNF	DNF

=== Complete JGTC results ===
(key) (Races in bold indicate pole position) (Races in italics indicate fastest lap)

Year	Team	Car	Class	1	2	3	4	5	6	7	8	DC	Pts
2002	Tsuchiya Engineering	Toyota Supra	GT500	TAI	FUJ; 13	SUG	SEP	FUJ	MOT	MIN	SUZ	NC	0

== Sources ==
- Profile at www.grandprix.com

Sporting positions
Preceded by Richard Morgan	Formula Ford Festival; Winner; 1975	Succeeded by Derek Daly
Preceded by Riccardo Patrese	Macau Grand Prix; Winner; 1979-1980	Succeeded by Bob Earl
Preceded by Brian Henton	European Formula Two; Champion; 1981	Succeeded by Corrado Fabi
Preceded by Satoru Nakajima	Japanese Formula Two; Champion; 1983	Succeeded by Satoru Nakajima
