= Ensign N179 =

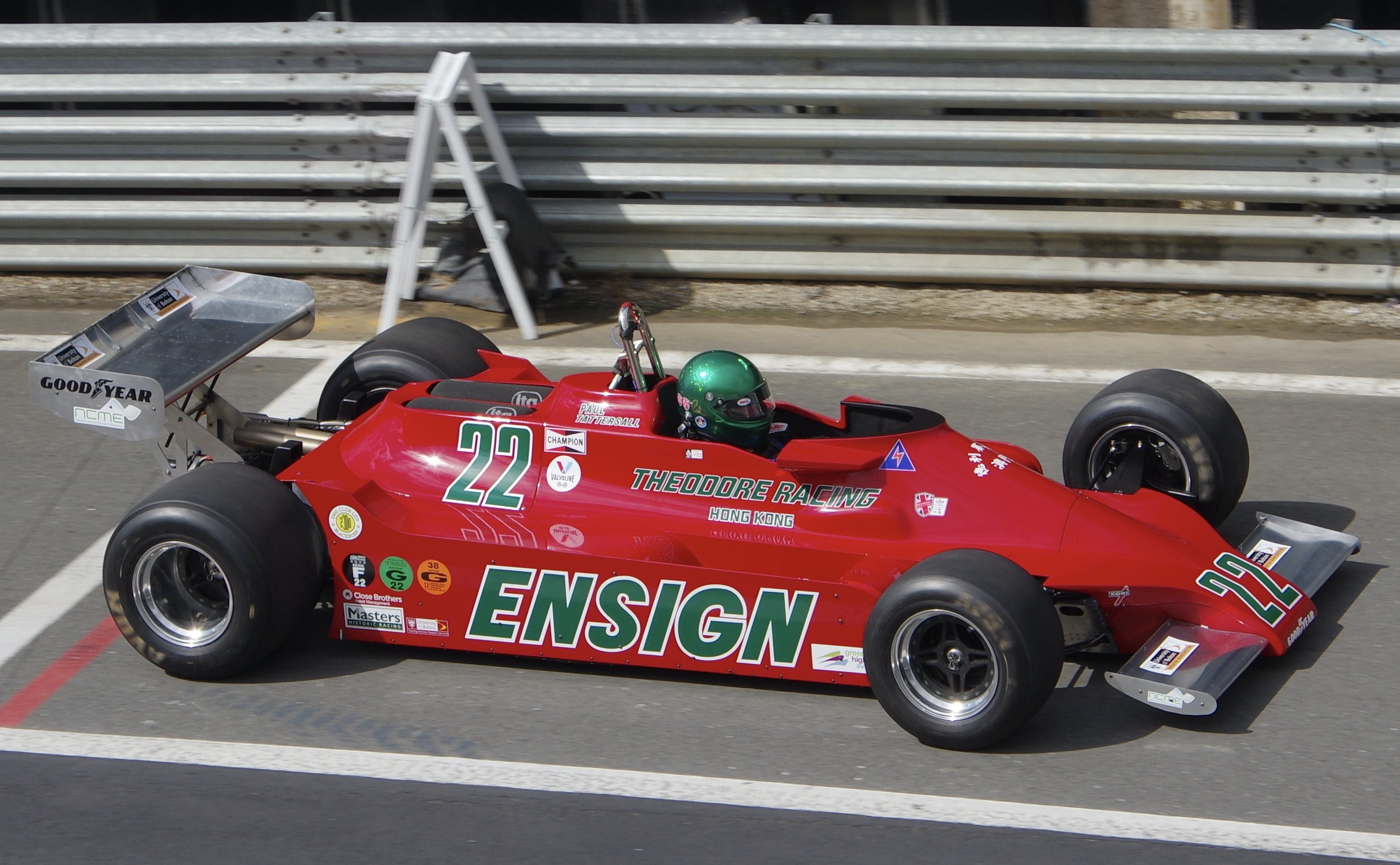
- Category: Formula One
- Constructor: Team Ensign
- Designers: John Baldwin (Technical Director); Shahab Ahmed (Chief Designer)
- Predecessor: Ensign N177
- Successor: Ensign N180

Technical specifications
- Chassis: Aluminium monocoque.
- Wheelbase: 2,667 mm (105.0 in)
- Engine: Ford-Cosworth DFV 2,993 cc (182.6 cu in) 90° V8, naturally aspirated, mid-mounted.
- Transmission: Hewland FGA 400 5-speed manual gearbox.
- Weight: 578 kg (1,274 lb)
- Fuel: Valvoline
- Tyres: Goodyear

Competition history
- Notable entrants: Team Ensign
- Notable drivers: (Republic of Ireland) Derek Daly (France) Patrick Gaillard (Switzerland) Marc Surer
- Debut: 1979 South African Grand Prix
Races	Wins	Poles	F/Laps
11	0	0	0
- Constructors' Championships: 0
- Drivers' Championships: 0
- Unless otherwise stated, all data refer to Formula One World Championship Grands Prix only.

The Ensign N179 was a Formula One racing car designed by Dave Baldwin, and used by Team Ensign during the 1979 Formula One season. It was designed by John Baldwin and Shahab Ahmed.

== Development ==
Team Ensign had not built an F1 car since 1977 and when 1978 ended, most teams were developing new cars with ground effect as Team Lotus won the 1978 championship with a ground effect car. John Baldwin and Shahab Ahmed were tasked to design the car and the N179 was equipped with a new system of front radiators, which theoretically should have cooled the engine and allowed underside downforce. However, because it could no longer cool down the engine the drivers suffered from excessive heat in the cockpit.

== Racing history ==
Team Ensign had signed Irishman Derek Daly for 1979, but the team used the older Ensign N177 for the Argentine and Brazilian Grand Prix's. The N179 made its debut at South Africa but Daly failed to qualify. He qualified for the United States Grand Prix West but retired after an accident. Ensign used the older N177 at Spain and Belgium, but Daly failed to qualify both times. The N179 was used at the Monaco Grand Prix but Daly failed to qualify. He was replaced by Frenchman Patrick Gaillard for France but Gaillard failed to qualify. He qualified for the British Grand Prix and finished 13th.Gaillard failed also to qualify for Germany.

He qualified for the Austrian Grand Prix, but retired from suspension failure, and then failed to qualify for Holland. He was replaced by Swiss driver Marc Surer for the final three races, the Italian, Canadian and United States Grand Prix's. Surer failed to qualify in Italy and Canada, but qualified for the United States and retired with a blown engine.

The N179 was replaced by the Ensign N180 for the 1980 season.

== Complete Formula One World Championship results ==
(key)(results in bold indicate pole position, results in italics indicate fastest lap)

Year	Entrants	Engine	Tyres	Drivers	1	2	3	4	5	6	7	8	9	10	11	12	13	14	15	Points	WCC
1979	Team Ensign	Ford Cosworth DFV 3.0 V8	**G**		ARG	BRA	RSA	USW	ESP	BEL	MON	FRA	GBR	GER	AUT	NED	ITA	CAN	USA	**0**	-
1979	Team Ensign	Ford Cosworth DFV 3.0 V8	**G**	Derek Daly			DNQ	Ret			DNQ									**0**	-
1979	Team Ensign	Ford Cosworth DFV 3.0 V8	**G**	Patrick Gaillard								DNQ	13	DNQ	Ret	DNQ				**0**	-
1979	Team Ensign	Ford Cosworth DFV 3.0 V8	**G**	Marc Surer													DNQ	DNQ	Ret	**0**	-
