= 1980 Spanish Grand Prix =

Coordinates: 40°37′1.6″N 3°35′8.1″W

- Non-championship race in the 1980 Formula One season

Race details
- Date: 1 June 1980
- Official name: XXVI Gran Premio de Espana
- Location: Circuito Permanente del Jarama in Madrid, Spain
- Course: Permanent racing facility
- Course length: 3.314 km (2.059 miles)
- Distance: 80 laps, 272.320 km (169.200 miles)
- Weather: Sunshine

Pole position
Driver	(France) Jacques Laffite	Ligier-Ford
- Time: 1:12.647

Fastest lap
Driver	(Australia) Alan Jones	Williams-Ford
- Time: 1:15.467

Podium
First	(Australia) Alan Jones	Williams-Ford
Second	(West Germany) Jochen Mass	Arrows-Ford
Third	(Italy) Elio de Angelis	Lotus-Ford

The 1980 Spanish Grand Prix (formally the XXVI Gran Premio de España) was a Formula One motor race held on 1 June 1980 at Circuito Permanente del Jarama. Originally scheduled to be part of the 1980 World Championship of Drivers, following the running of the race it was announced that World Championship points would not be awarded to the competitors, making it a non-championship race. The winner of the race was Alan Jones, driving for the Williams team. Jochen Mass finished second for Arrows and Elio de Angelis third for Team Lotus.

Owing to disputes as part of the FISA–FOCA war, the race went ahead without the manufacturer teams of Ferrari, Alfa Romeo and Renault, because the Fédération Internationale du Sport Automobile (FISA), then the governing body of Formula One, had declared the race illegal. The other teams drove the race, now sanctioned by the Formula One Constructors Association (FOCA). All teams competing in the race ran Ford engines.

Carlos Reutemann, Nelson Piquet and Didier Pironi all retired from the race whilst in the lead, Reutemann due to a collision and Pironi and Piquet because of mechanical problems. Only six of the twenty-two drivers who took the start of the race made it to the end, and only three were on the lead lap.

== Build-up ==
The Spanish Grand Prix was originally scheduled to be the seventh round of the 1980 World Championships. Coming into the race, Brabham driver Nelson Piquet led the World Championship of Drivers, one point ahead of Renault's René Arnoux. Williams driver Alan Jones was third, a further two points behind and Ligier driver Didier Pironi was fourth, two points behind Jones. The Constructors' Championship was led by Williams with 34 points, with second place Ligier five points behind. Brabham were third with 22 points and Renault fourth with 21 points.

In the previous rounds of the championships, there had been disputes between motorsports' governing body, the FISA, and the body representing the independent constructors competing in the championship, the FOCA. 12 of the 15 constructors competing in the championship were members of FOCA. The three constructors that were not affiliated to FOCA, Renault, Ferrari and Alfa Romeo, were all owned and operated by a manufacturer. The FOCA teams perceived FISA as showing a bias towards the manufacturer teams through the regulations by which the sport was governed, and were unhappy at the way FISA handled commercial aspects of the sport, including the distribution of revenue to the competing teams.

As part of the dispute, drivers from FOCA affiliated teams had been advised to boycott the driver briefings at the Belgium and Monaco Grands Prix, the preceding rounds of the championship. The compulsory 45-minute briefings had been announced by FISA president Jean-Marie Balestre in February, but FOCA's lawyers had noticed that the requirement for drivers to attend had not been included in the rulebook. Nevertheless, FISA issued fines of approximately $2000 to the drivers that did not attend them at Belgium and Monaco, and after non-payment had threatened suspension of the involved drivers' racing licences. By 29 May, prior to the first official practice for the race, FISA had ordered the suspension of the racing licences of fifteen drivers.

The RACE organises under its own responsibility on Sunday, June 1, 1980, the XXVI Gran Premio de Espana at Jarama, and by this it is no longer restricted by the FISA regulations.

— RACE statement made on the morning of Friday 30 May.

In response, the teams affiliated to FOCA threatened to withdraw from the race. The organizers of the event, the Real Automóvil Club de España (RACE), concerned that their race was in jeopardy, offered to pay a deposit on the fines owed by the drivers. The FISA refused any payment, unless RACE could prove that the deposit came from the drivers themselves (which would be an admission of guilt on the teams' part). The King of Spain, Juan Carlos, insisted that RACE proceed with the event, and as a result RACE bypassed the Federación Española de Automovilismo, the Spanish motorsport federation, who were affiliated to FISA. With the race now not sanctioned by FISA, there was no requirement that the drivers hold a FISA racing licence.

The Jarama circuit had been modified from the year before, with the run-up to the Bugatti curve shortened to increase run-off area there.

== Practice and qualifying ==
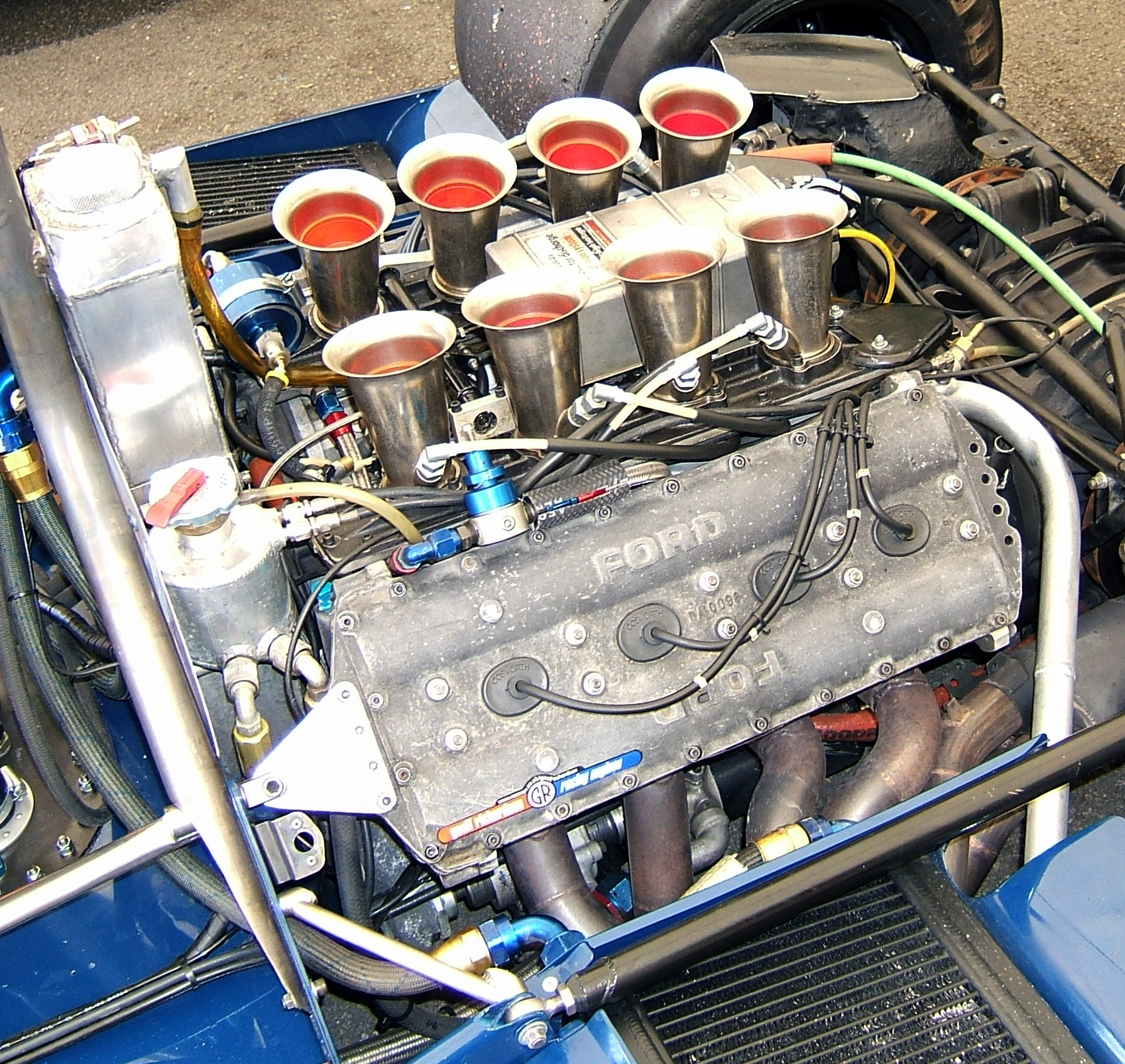
With the withdrawal of Renault, Ferrari and Alfa Romeo, all cars taking part used the Cosworth DFV engine

The first practice session had begun at 10:00 am local time (UTC+2). FOCA teams did not take part, leaving only the manufacturer teams of Renault, Ferrari and Alfa Romeo contesting. Because of the statement made by RACE, this session was halted after half an hour by the organizers. The Guardia Civil then escorted FISA officials out of the circuit. Practice got underway again at 12:30 pm, this time consisting of all the teams with the exception of Renault, Ferrari, Alfa Romeo and Osella. Citing fear of further sanctions in other forms of motorsport should they take part in a race deemed illegal by FISA, these four teams withdrew from practice, although all remained at the circuit in case a compromise deal was brokered before the race.

Two qualifying sessions were held to determine the starting order for the race; the first on Friday afternoon and the second on Saturday afternoon. The fastest laptime set by a driver in either session was used to determine grid placings. There were 26 starting positions available for the race, and the qualifying sessions would normally be used to decide which drivers would miss out, but with the cars from Renault, Ferrari and Alfa Romeo not taking part, the remaining 22 drivers could not fail to qualify for the race.

In the Friday qualifying session, Ligier driver Jacques Laffite was fastest with a time of 1:12.647, which was over a second and a half quicker than the pole position time set the previous year. Didier Pironi, Laffite's team-mate at Ligier, finished second with Williams drivers Carlos Reutemann and Alan Jones taking third and fourth places in the session.

Eddie Cheever, driving the sole Osella entry, had not taken part in any running on Friday but did compete on Saturday, following a decision by team owner Enzo Osella to loan the cars and driver to his sponsors, Denim Aftershave. Cheever was entered by a team named after the sponsor, which Osella believed would avoid any sanctions against the Osella team's licence, and in a bid to keep up the pretense, Osella himself was also not present in the pitlane. The Saturday qualifying session took place in hotter temperatures, which meant that cars were approximately half-a-second slower per lap than they had been on Friday. In this second session, Williams driver Alan Jones switched to his spare car and improved on his Friday time, which secured him second position on the grid and displaced Pironi to third and Reutemann to fourth. The guaranteed qualification meant that this was the only race in the 1980 season where both cars entered by the Shadow team would start a race.

Speaking prior to the race, René Arnoux, the Renault driver expressed his view that it was "inadmissible that we can't drive". Arnoux, who was placed second in the championship at the start of the weekend, was of the opinion that "if only FOCA cars take part in the race, then it can't count for championship points".

== Race ==
The race started at 16:00 local time (UTC+2) on Sunday afternoon, and took place in dry and sunny weather with temperatures around 38 °C (100 °F). Carlos Reutemann made a good start from fourth place on the grid, and drew level with his team-mate Alan Jones, who had passed pole-sitter Jacques Laffite. Following the first corner of the race, Reutemann led from Jones, with Laffite in third alongside his Ligier team-mate Didier Pironi. That remained the order at the end of the first lap, with Nelson Piquet a close fifth and the rest of the field dropping back from the leaders. David Kennedy spun off the track at the start of lap two and was unable to rejoin the race and so became the first retirement. Local wildcard driver Emilio de Villota had a similar incident but was able to rejoin, albeit in last place.

Pironi had opted to use a harder rear-left tyre than his rear-right and by lap three he was struggling with the handling of the car. In addition, he was having problems with his brakes. A slight mistake allowed Piquet to overtake him for fourth place. Alain Prost, running in 12th place was forced to retire on lap five with engine problems. Both Keke Rosberg and Derek Daly suffered brake failure causing them to crash, neither were hurt. A missed gearshift by Jones on lap 13 saw him drop three places to fifth. Laffite, who had moved up to second as a result made a few attempts to pass Reutemann for the lead, but was unable to find a way past.

Jan Lammers was running in fourth place, when brake problems forced him to come into the pits. He rejoined, but suffered electrical problems and pitted again where the ATS team took the decision to retire the car. Mario Andretti pulled into the pits to retire on lap 29 with a broken engine, and one lap later Riccardo Patrese retired from the race with a broken gearbox, having stopped for a lengthy pitstop five laps previously which had dropped him down the order.

On lap 35, the leaders came up to lap Emilio de Villota. De Villota attempted to move out of the way of Reutemann by taking the inside line through the corner, allowing Reutemann to go around him. Laffite saw an opportunity to get past Reutemann by going inside of de Villota. Instead he collided with de Villota which caused him to bounce off and hit Reutemann as well. Both Reutemann and Laffite retired on the spot and although de Villota was able to carry on to the pits, his suspension was beyond repair and his race was also over. Piquet assumed the lead of the race, with Pironi second and Jones third within three seconds of the leader. Piquet led for seven laps until on lap 42 his Brabham's gearbox failed, and he was unable to continue. Geoff Lees retired on the same lap, with a broken wishbone on his car. Due in part to the number of retirements, the two leaders had built up a lead of around 50 seconds to the rest of the field by the halfway stage.

When coming up to lap Patrick Gaillard, John Watson misjudged Gaillard's braking point and hit him. Watson's McLaren was launched into the air over Gaillard's Ensign. Gaillard continued after a pitstop to replace some of the Ensign car's body panels however Watson's race was over.

Pironi was 15 laps from the end, when he noticed a front wheel wobble on his Ligier. He slowed the car to approx 50 km/h (30 mph) before the wheel came off, and he pulled off the track at the end of the start/finish straight to retire, giving Jones the lead. Jones continued to keep a fairly constant distance between himself and second placed Jochen Mass to win the race, with Elio de Angelis, the only other car to be on the lead lap, finishing third. Jean-Pierre Jarier and Emerson Fittipaldi finished in fourth and fifth place respectively, both one lap down. Sixth placed Patrick Gaillard was the last driver to be classified as finishing the race, five laps down after his earlier collision with John Watson's car.

== Post race ==
The Fédération Internationale de l'Automobile (FIA), FISA's parent organization, held an extraordinary meeting of its executive committee in Athens on the day following the race. At the meeting it was decided that the race would not count for championship points. The FIA committee also decided that FOCA's seat on the FISA executive committee would be withdrawn. FIA president Paul Alfons von Metternich-Winneburg commented after the meeting that "it was time to decide who runs motor racing...the (FIA) executive committee decided to take things back into its own hands...Mr Ecclestone does not own (Formula One)". In response, FOCA president Ecclestone was quoted as saying his organisation were "disappointed but not surprised that the FIA has made it impossible for us to talk."

Criticism was also made by FIA towards the Real Automóvil Club de España (RACE), for what the FIA described as "acting in a deplorable manner to the Spanish federation", by withdrawing responsibility for the organisation of the event from the Federación Española de Automovilismo (FEA) on the Friday morning before the race. The RACE contended that acted legally as they had initially delegated the responsibilities to the FEA, and had provided the required notification to the FIA when they withdrew the responsibility.

In the week following the race, Jones gave his view on the circumstances surrounding the race and whether championship points should be awarded, writing in Motor magazine "My job is to drive racing cars, not to get involved in politics. As far as I'm concerned, the Spanish GP was no different from normal: it required the same amount of effort, it covered the same distance and I gave it the same dedication that I give to any other Grand Prix. These things would have been the same whether I'd won or lost. As it happened, I won the race, and now I have to wait and see if I'll be given the points."

A RACE spokesman announced that they "still consider the Jarama race counts for points", and would appeal the decision made by the FIA in Athens. At the instigation of Frank Williams, owner of the Williams team, the British Minister for Sport Hector Monro contacted the FIA president Prince Metternich and requested that he intervene to restore relationships between FISA and FOCA, and reverse the decision to not award points. However, a meeting of the FIA Executive Committee on 31 July confirmed that the race would not count towards the world championships and no points would be awarded. In addition they declared the Grand Prix "absolutely illegal" and announced that all drivers and teams that participated in the race would each be given suspended fines of CHF 3000 (USD 1,400).

In the meantime, the fines that were outstanding prior to the Spanish Grand Prix had been paid off before the next scheduled event in the championship, the French Grand Prix, which resulted in the drivers' having their racing licences returned and the event proceeding with a full entry of teams and drivers. Despite not being awarded points for his victory in the Spanish Grand Prix, Jones would go on to win the 1980 World Championship of Drivers. Speaking after the conclusion of the season, Jones said of the race "Whatever Balestre or anyone else says, that was a Grand Prix as far as I'm concerned, and I won it."

The Spanish Grand Prix was the first race to be affected as part of the FISA-FOCA war. Future races such as the 1981 South African Grand Prix and 1982 San Marino Grand Prix would also see teams not compete as the two organisations competed for control of the sport.

== Classification ==
=== Qualifying ===
Pos.	No.	Driver	Constructor	Time	Gap
1	26	(France) Jacques Laffite	Ligier-Ford	1:12.64	-
2	27	(Australia) Alan Jones	Williams-Ford	1:13.02	+ 0.38
3	25	(France) Didier Pironi	Ligier-Ford	1:13.03	+ 0.39
4	28	(Argentina) Carlos Reutemann	Williams-Ford	1:13.27	+ 0.63
5	5	(Brazil) Nelson Piquet	Brabham-Ford	1:13.60	+ 0.96
6	8	(France) Alain Prost	McLaren-Ford	1:13.63	+ 0.99
7	6	(Argentina) Ricardo Zunino	Brabham-Ford	1:14.18	+ 1.54
8	11	(United States) Mario Andretti	Lotus-Ford	1:14.24	+ 1.60
9	9	(Netherlands) Jan Lammers	ATS-Ford	1:14.42	+ 1.78
10	31	(United States) Eddie Cheever	Osella-Ford	1:14.42	+ 1.78
11	29	(Italy) Riccardo Patrese	Arrows-Ford	1:14.43	+ 1.79
12	7	(United Kingdom) John Watson	McLaren-Ford	1:14.57	+ 1.93
13	12	(Italy) Elio de Angelis	Lotus-Ford	1:14.58	+ 1.94
14	30	(West Germany) Jochen Mass	Arrows-Ford	1:14.80	+ 2.16
15	3	(France) Jean-Pierre Jarier	Tyrrell-Ford	1:14.82	+ 2.18
16	4	(Republic of Ireland) Derek Daly	Tyrrell-Ford	1:14.96	+ 2.32
17	34	(Spain) Emilio de Villota	Williams-Ford	1:15.04	+ 2.40
18	21	(Finland) Keke Rosberg	Fittipaldi-Ford	1:15.10	+ 2.46
19	20	(Brazil) Emerson Fittipaldi	Fittipaldi-Ford	1:15.17	+ 2.53
20	17	(United Kingdom) Geoff Lees	Shadow-Ford	1:15.70	+ 3.06
21	14	(France) Patrick Gaillard	Ensign-Ford	1:15.95	+ 3.31
22	18	(Republic of Ireland) David Kennedy	Shadow-Ford	1:16.44	+ 3.80
WD	1	(South Africa) Jody Scheckter	Ferrari		
WD	2	(Canada) Gilles Villeneuve	Ferrari		
WD	15	(France) Jean-Pierre Jabouille	Renault		
WD	16	(France) René Arnoux	Renault		
WD	22	(France) Patrick Depailler	Alfa Romeo		
WD	23	(Italy) Bruno Giacomelli	Alfa Romeo		
WD	35	(Italy) Vittorio Brambilla	Alfa Romeo		
DNA	50	(Chile) Eliseo Salazar	RAM Williams-Ford		
DNA	41	(United Kingdom) Brian Henton	Ensign-Ford		

=== Race ===
Pos.	No.	Driver	Constructor	Laps	Time/Retired
1	27	(Australia) Alan Jones	Williams-Ford	80	1:43:14.076
2	30	(West Germany) Jochen Mass	Arrows-Ford	80	+ 50.940
3	12	(Italy) Elio de Angelis	Lotus-Ford	80	+ 1:12.271
4	3	(France) Jean-Pierre Jarier	Tyrrell-Ford	79	+ 1 lap
5	20	(Brazil) Emerson Fittipaldi	Fittipaldi-Ford	79	+ 1 lap
6	14	(France) Patrick Gaillard	Ensign-Ford	75	+ 5 laps
Ret	31	(United States) Eddie Cheever	Osella-Ford	67	Gearbox
Ret	25	(France) Didier Pironi	Ligier-Ford	65	Lost wheel
Ret	7	(United Kingdom) John Watson	McLaren-Ford	49	Accident
Ret	5	(Brazil) Nelson Piquet	Brabham-Ford	42	Gearbox
Ret	17	(United Kingdom) Geoff Lees	Shadow-Ford	42	Suspension
Ret	28	(Argentina) Carlos Reutemann	Williams-Ford	36	Accident
Ret	26	(France) Jacques Laffite	Ligier-Ford	36	Accident
Ret	6	(Argentina) Ricardo Zunino	Brabham-Ford	34	Gearbox
Ret	34	(Spain) Emilio de Villota	Williams-Ford	34	Accident
Ret	29	(Italy) Riccardo Patrese	Arrows-Ford	30	Gearbox
Ret	11	(United States) Mario Andretti	Lotus-Ford	29	Engine
Ret	9	(Netherlands) Jan Lammers	ATS-Ford	26	Electrics
Ret	4	(Republic of Ireland) Derek Daly	Tyrrell-Ford	13	Accident
Ret	21	(Finland) Keke Rosberg	Fittipaldi-Ford	11	Accident
Ret	8	(France) Alain Prost	McLaren-Ford	5	Engine
Ret	18	(Republic of Ireland) David Kennedy	Shadow-Ford	2	Accident

Previous race: 1979 Dino Ferrari Grand Prix	Formula One non-championship races 1980 season	Next race: 1981 South African Grand Prix
Previous race: 1979 Spanish Grand Prix	Spanish Grand Prix	Next race: 1981 Spanish Grand Prix
