= Patrick Gaillard =

French racing driver (born 1952)

- Born: Patrick Jean Gaillard; 12 February 1952 (age 74); Paris, France

Formula One World Championship career
- Nationality: (France) French
- Active years: 1979
- Team: Ensign
- Entries: 5 (2 starts)
- Championships: 0
- Wins: 0
- Podiums: 0
- Career points: 0
- Pole positions: 0
- Fastest laps: 0
- First entry: 1979 French Grand Prix
- Last entry: 1979 Dutch Grand Prix

Patrick Jean Gaillard (French pronunciation: [pa.tʁik ɡa.jaʁ]; born 12 February 1952) is a former racing driver from France. He participated in five World Championship Formula One Grands Prix, debuting on 1 July 1979. He scored no championship points.

After performing well in French Formula Renault and Formula 3, Gaillard moved into Formula 2 in 1979, the same year as he drove for Ensign in Formula 1. The Ensign N179 was not a good car and Gaillard struggled on occasions, failing to qualify three times out of five, before being dropped in favour of Marc Surer.

In 1980, Gaillard returned to Ensign for the Spanish Grand Prix and finished in 6th place—the last of six cars still running at the finish, five laps down. However, the result (which would have earned points) did not count as this race was subsequently downgraded to non-Championship status due to the FISA–FOCA war (F1 sporting body versus the F1 manufacturers), making Gaillard's only point nullified.

Thereafter, Gaillard drove in Formula 2, CanAm, and sports cars including the 24 Hours of Le Mans before retiring. He later became a racing instructor.

== Complete Formula One World Championship results ==
(key) (Races in bold indicate pole position)

Year	Entrant	Chassis	Engine	1	2	3	4	5	6	7	8	9	10	11	12	13	14	15	WDC	Points
1979	Team Ensign	Ensign N179	Cosworth V8	ARG	BRA	RSA	USW	ESP	BEL	MON	FRA; DNQ	GBR; 13	GER; DNQ	AUT; Ret	NED; DNQ	ITA	CAN	USA	NC	0
