= Ensign Racing =

Auto racing team

Ensign
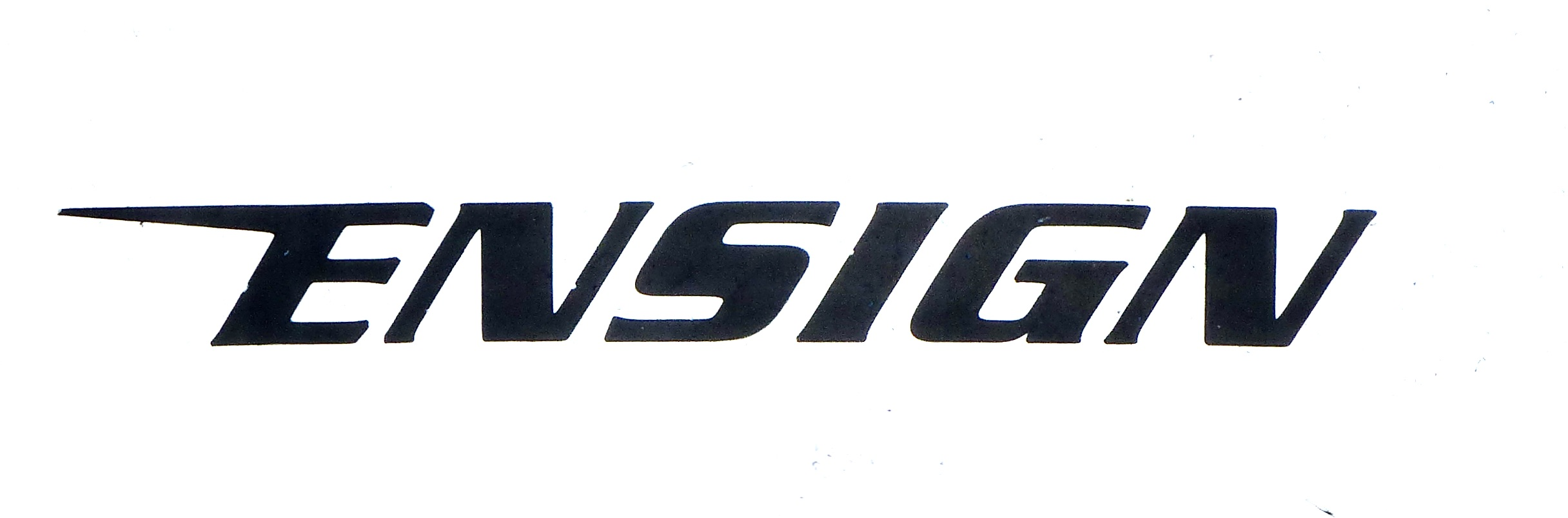
- Full name: Ensign Racing Team
- Base: Lichfield, United Kingdom
- Founder(s): Mo Nunn
- Noted drivers: (Switzerland) Clay Regazzoni (New Zealand) Chris Amon (Switzerland) Marc Surer (Belgium) Jacky Ickx (Brazil) Nelson Piquet (Netherlands) Jan Lammers (Liechtenstein) Rikky von Opel (Netherlands) Gijs van Lennep (Netherlands) Roelof Wunderink (United Kingdom) Tiff Needell

Formula One World Championship career
- First entry: 1973 French Grand Prix
- Races entered: 134 (98 starts)
- Constructors' Championships: 0
- Drivers' Championships: 0
- Race victories: 0
- Pole positions: 0
- Fastest laps: 1
- Final entry: 1982 Caesars Palace Grand Prix

Ensign was a Formula One constructor from Britain. They participated in 133 grands prix, entering a total of 155 cars. Ensign scored 19 championship points and no podium finishes. The best result was a 4th place at the 1981 Brazilian Grand Prix by Marc Surer, who also took fastest lap of the race.

Ensign was founded by Morris Nunn who also carried out design duties during the first two seasons of the team's existence. Nunn would later go on to be a prominent chief engineer in the American-based Champ Car series, winning championships with drivers Alex Zanardi and Juan Pablo Montoya in the late 1990s.

== Formula One ==
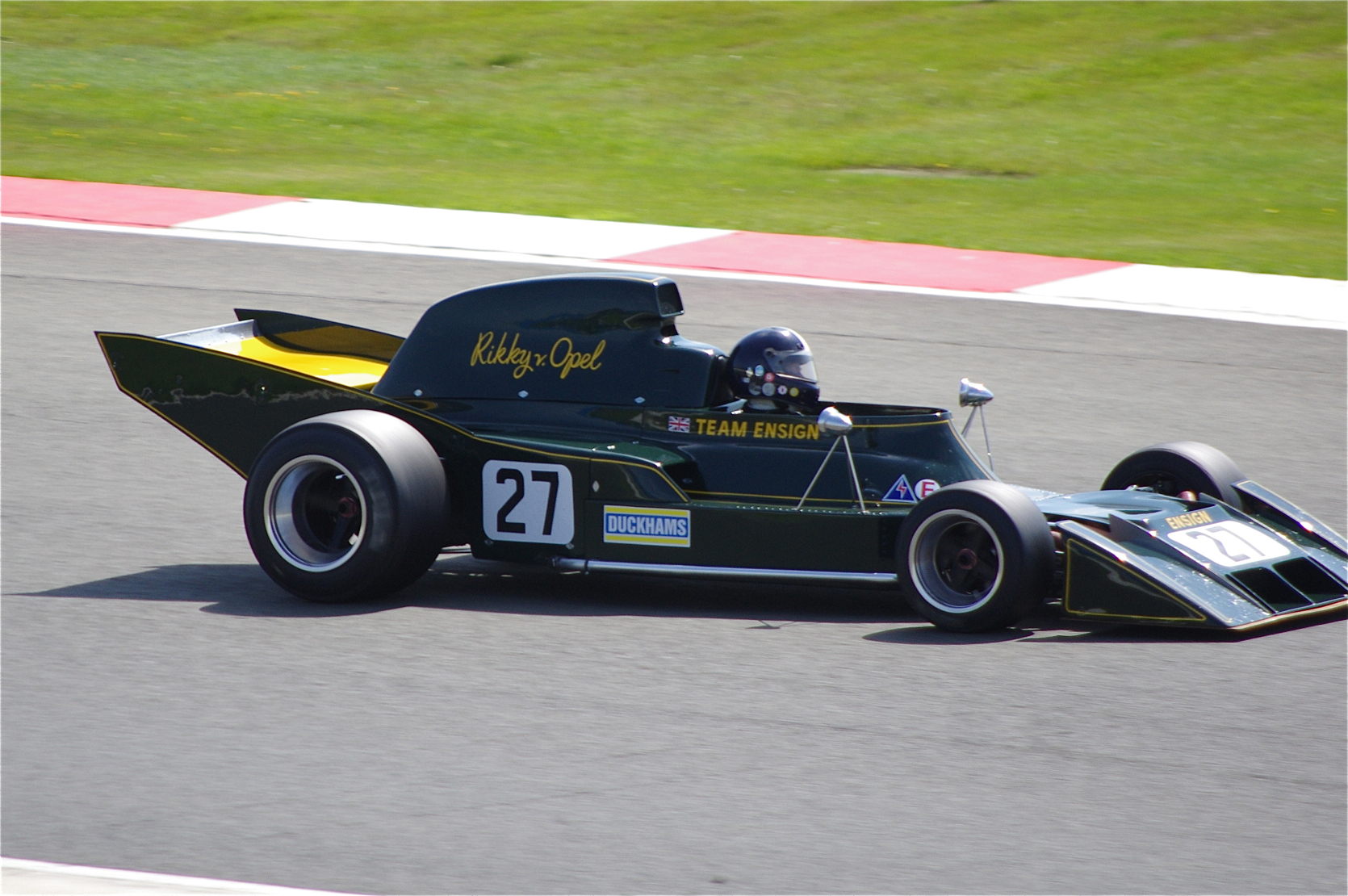
The N173, Ensign's first Formula One car, being driven at Silverstone in 2012.

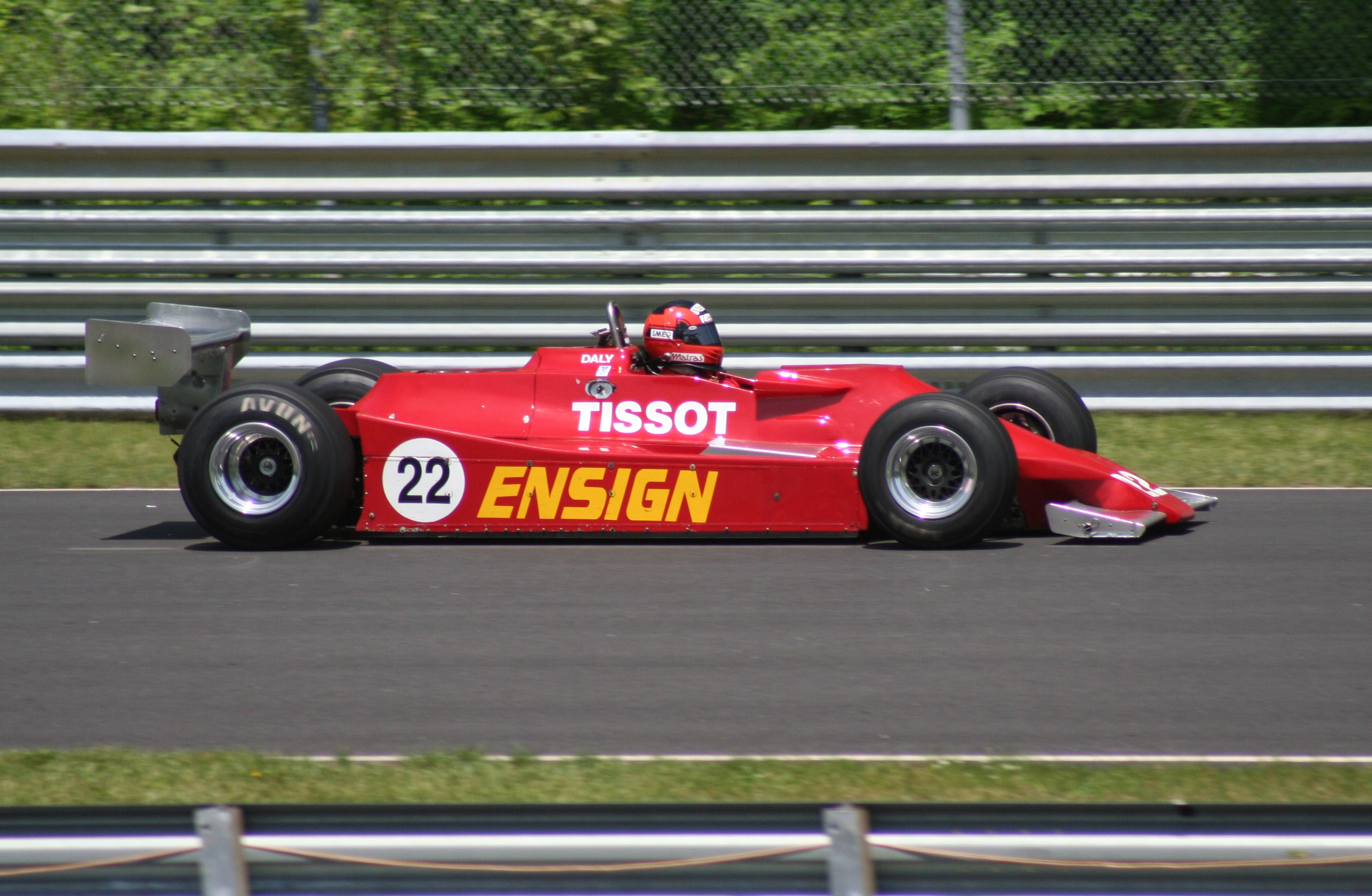
An Ensign N177 being raced in a Historic Grand Prix at the Lime Rock Park circuit in 2009.

Ensign entered Formula One in 1973, with backing from pay driver, Rikky von Opel. Von Opel had driven for the team in Formula Three in 1972 and won the Lombard North Central British Formula Three Championship that year. Based upon that success, von Opel commissioned a Formula One chassis. Their first season was not successful, von Opel only finished two races and the team's best result that season was 13th at the 1973 British Grand Prix. However, the partnership continued into 1974, but von Opel left after the first race of the season, having been offered a works Brabham drive. He was replaced at Ensign by Vern Schuppan whose only finish was 15th at the Belgian Grand Prix and was later himself replaced by Mike Wilds. Wilds only qualified in America; he finished the race after a pit stop for fuel but was not classified, nine laps behind.

For 1975 Ensign was sponsored by HB Bewaking (a Dutch company) leading them to sign Dutch drivers. Roelof Wunderink and Gijs van Lennep. Wunderink did not have much success, qualifying for three races and finishing one. Gijs van Lennep qualified for all his races and took sixth place in Germany, securing the first points for Ensign in Formula One. Chris Amon also raced for the team in Austria and Italy finishing 12th both times. In 1976 Amon stayed with Ensign having great qualifying results. He qualified third in Sweden and sixth in Britain but only took points in Spain where he finished in fifth place. Patrick Nève replaced Amon in France and Hans Binder replaced Amon in Austria. Jacky Ickx would race the rest of the season for Ensign.

In 1977 Clay Regazzoni raced for Ensign, scoring five points with best finishes of fifth in Italy and America. In 1978 the team entered cars for Danny Ongais and Lamberto Leoni, but Ongais left after two races and Leoni after four races. Jacky Ickx contested the next four races and Derek Daly raced the rest of the season scoring a point in Canada. Also in 1978 Nelson Piquet made his debut in Formula 1 at the German Grand Prix at the Hockenheimring driving an Ensign. In 1979 Daly stayed with Ensign but he left after the Monaco Grand Prix and was replaced by Patrick Gaillard. Gaillard only qualified at two out of five races and was replaced by Marc Surer for the final three races of the season.

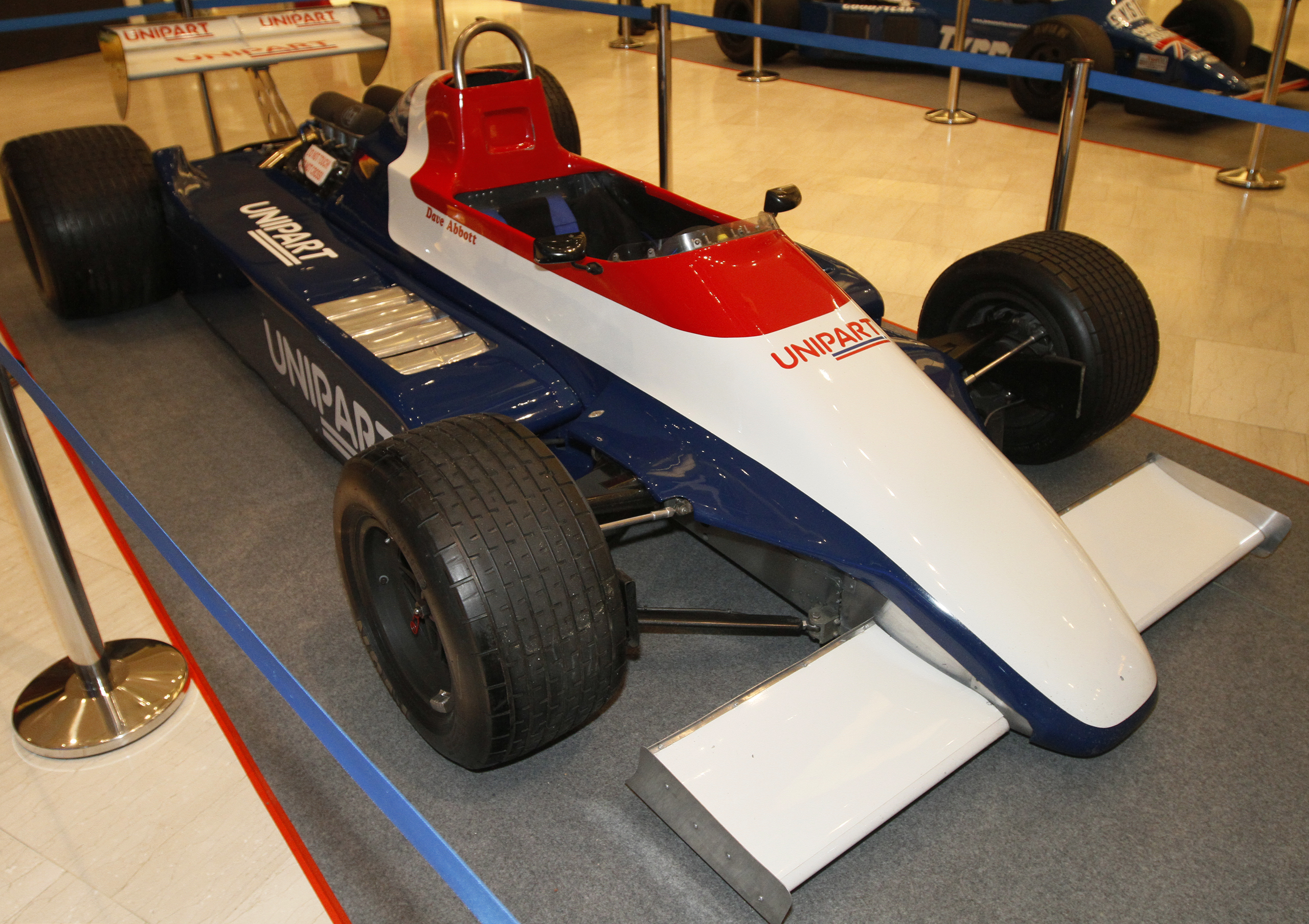
The N180 at the Pavilion Kuala Lumpur

In 1980 Clay Regazzoni again joined Ensign but at Long Beach Regazzoni's brake pedal broke causing him to go straight on at the Queen's Hairpin crashing into the parked car of Ricardo Zunino leaving him paralyzed. Tiff Needell raced in Belgium, but failed to qualify for the Monaco Grand Prix. Jan Lammers raced the rest of the season.

Marc Surer raced for Ensign in 1981 and finished in fourth place in the rain in Brazil where he also took fastest lap of the race. Surer also finished sixth in Monaco. Eliseo Salazar replaced Surer from Spain onwards. Salazar finished sixth in the Netherlands. That year the team moved from Chasetown to premises on Trent Valley Road in Lichfield.

In 1982 Roberto Guerrero raced for Ensign. He only finished in two races. Meanwhile, the team's cars were also involved in the last year of British F1 Championship, when Jim Crawford won the championship in an AMCO Ensign.

After the 1982 season, Ensign was merged into the Theodore team, which it had previous ties to via financier Teddy Yip and took that team's name.

Ensign driver Roberto Guerrero continued on with the newly merged team for 1983, as did the team's main car designer. The Theodore F1 team did not last the 1983 season, though, and shut down late in the year.

Ensign cars are still being raced in the Historic Grand Prix of Monaco and the FIA Historic F1 Championship, with success in both series.

== Complete Formula One World Championship results ==
(key)

Year	Chassis	Engines	Tyres	Drivers	1	2	3	4	5	6	7	8	9	10	11	12	13	14	15	16	17	Points	WCC
1973	N173	Ford Cosworth DFV 3.0 V8	F		ARG	BRA	RSA	ESP	BEL	MON	SWE	FRA	GBR	NED	GER	AUT	ITA	CAN	USA			0	NC
1973	N173	Ford Cosworth DFV 3.0 V8	F	(Liechtenstein) Rikky von Opel								15	13	DNS		Ret	Ret	NC	Ret			0	NC
1974	N174	Ford Cosworth DFV 3.0 V8	F		ARG	BRA	RSA	ESP	BEL	MON	SWE	NED	FRA	GBR	GER	AUT	ITA	CAN	USA			0	NC
1974	N174	Ford Cosworth DFV 3.0 V8	F	(Liechtenstein) Rikky von Opel	DNS																	0	NC
1974	N174	Ford Cosworth DFV 3.0 V8	F	(Australia) Vern Schuppan					15	Ret	DSQ	DSQ	DNQ	DNQ	Ret							0	NC
1974	N174	Ford Cosworth DFV 3.0 V8	F	(United Kingdom) Mike Wilds												DNQ	DNQ	DNQ	NC			0	NC
1975	N174; N175	Ford Cosworth DFV 3.0 V8	G		ARG	BRA	RSA	ESP	MON	BEL	SWE	NED	FRA	GBR	GER	AUT	ITA	USA				1	12th
1975	N174; N175	Ford Cosworth DFV 3.0 V8	G	(Netherlands) Roelof Wunderink				Ret	DNQ					DNQ		NC	DNQ	Ret				1	12th
1975	N174; N175	Ford Cosworth DFV 3.0 V8	G	(Netherlands) Gijs van Lennep								10	15		6							1	12th
1975	N174; N175	Ford Cosworth DFV 3.0 V8	G	(New Zealand) Chris Amon												12	12					1	12th
1976	N174; N176	Ford Cosworth DFV 3.0 V8	G		BRA	RSA	USW	ESP	BEL	MON	SWE	FRA	GBR	GER	AUT	NED	ITA	CAN	USA	JPN		2	12th
1976	N174; N176	Ford Cosworth DFV 3.0 V8	G	(New Zealand) Chris Amon		14	8	5	Ret	13	Ret		Ret	Ret								2	12th
1976	N174; N176	Ford Cosworth DFV 3.0 V8	G	(Belgium) Patrick Nève								18										2	12th
1976	N174; N176	Ford Cosworth DFV 3.0 V8	G	(Austria) Hans Binder											Ret							2	12th
1976	N174; N176	Ford Cosworth DFV 3.0 V8	G	(Belgium) Jacky Ickx												Ret	10	13	Ret			2	12th
1977	N177	Ford Cosworth DFV 3.0 V8	G		ARG	BRA	RSA	USW	ESP	MON	BEL	SWE	FRA	GBR	GER	AUT	NED	ITA	USA	CAN	JPN	10*	10th*
1977	N177	Ford Cosworth DFV 3.0 V8	G	(Switzerland) Clay Regazzoni	6	Ret	9	Ret	Ret	DNQ	Ret	7	7	DNQ	Ret	Ret	Ret	5	5	Ret	Ret	10*	10th*
1977	N177	Ford Cosworth DFV 3.0 V8	G	(Belgium) Jacky Ickx						10												10*	10th*
1978	N177	Ford Cosworth DFV 3.0 V8	G		ARG	BRA	RSA	USW	MON	BEL	ESP	SWE	FRA	GBR	GER	AUT	NED	ITA	USA	CAN		1	13th
1978	N177	Ford Cosworth DFV 3.0 V8	G	(United States) Danny Ongais	Ret	Ret																1	13th
1978	N177	Ford Cosworth DFV 3.0 V8	G	(Belgium) Jacky Ickx					Ret	12	Ret	DNQ										1	13th
1978	N177	Ford Cosworth DFV 3.0 V8	G	(Republic of Ireland) Derek Daly									DNQ	Ret		DSQ	Ret	10	8	6		1	13th
1978	N177	Ford Cosworth DFV 3.0 V8	G	(Brazil) Nelson Piquet											Ret							1	13th
1978	N177	Ford Cosworth DFV 3.0 V8	G	(Italy) Lamberto Leoni	Ret	DNS	DNQ	DNQ														1	13th
1978	N177	Ford Cosworth DFV 3.0 V8	G	(Belgium) Bernard de Dryver						DNP												1	13th
1978	N177	Ford Cosworth DFV 3.0 V8	G	(United States) Brett Lunger															13			1	13th
1979	N177; N179	Ford Cosworth DFV 3.0 V8	G		ARG	BRA	RSA	USW	ESP	BEL	MON	FRA	GBR	GER	AUT	NED	ITA	CAN	USA			0	NC
1979	N177; N179	Ford Cosworth DFV 3.0 V8	G	(Republic of Ireland) Derek Daly	11	13	DNQ	Ret	DNQ	DNQ	DNQ											0	NC
1979	N177; N179	Ford Cosworth DFV 3.0 V8	G	(France) Patrick Gaillard								DNQ	13	DNQ	Ret	DNQ						0	NC
1979	N177; N179	Ford Cosworth DFV 3.0 V8	G	(Switzerland) Marc Surer													DNQ	DNQ	Ret			0	NC
1980	N180	Ford Cosworth DFV 3.0 V8	G		ARG	BRA	RSA	USW	BEL	MON	FRA	GBR	GER	AUT	NED	ITA	CAN	USA				0	NC
1980	N180	Ford Cosworth DFV 3.0 V8	G	(Switzerland) Clay Regazzoni	NC	Ret	9	Ret														0	NC
1980	N180	Ford Cosworth DFV 3.0 V8	G	(United Kingdom) Tiff Needell					Ret	DNQ												0	NC
1980	N180	Ford Cosworth DFV 3.0 V8	G	(Netherlands) Jan Lammers							DNQ	DNQ	14	DNQ	DNQ	DNQ	12	Ret				0	NC
1980	N180	Ford Cosworth DFV 3.0 V8	G	(United Kingdom) Geoff Lees											Ret	DNQ						0	NC
1981	N180B	Ford Cosworth DFV 3.0 V8	M A		USW	BRA	ARG	SMR	BEL	MON	ESP	FRA	GBR	GER	AUT	NED	ITA	CAN	CPL			5	11th
1981	N180B	Ford Cosworth DFV 3.0 V8	M A	(Switzerland) Marc Surer	Ret	4^{F}	Ret	9	11	6												5	11th
1981	N180B	Ford Cosworth DFV 3.0 V8	M A	(Colombia) Ricardo Londoño		DNP																5	11th
1981	N180B	Ford Cosworth DFV 3.0 V8	M A	(Chile) Eliseo Salazar							14	Ret	DNQ	NC	Ret	6	Ret	Ret	NC			5	11th
1982	N180B; N181	Ford Cosworth DFV 3.0 V8	P A		RSA	BRA	USW	SMR	BEL	MON	DET	CAN	NED	GBR	FRA	GER	AUT	SUI	ITA	CPL		0	NC
1982	N180B; N181	Ford Cosworth DFV 3.0 V8	P A	(Colombia) Roberto Guerrero	WD	DNQ	Ret		DNQ	DNQ	Ret	Ret	DNQ	Ret	DNQ	8	Ret	Ret	NC	DNS		0	NC

* Includes five points scored by Patrick Tambay in an Ensign N177 entered by Theodore Racing (see below).

=== Results of other Ensign cars ===
(key)

Year	Entrant	Chassis	Engine	Tyres	Driver	1	2	3	4	5	6	7	8	9	10	11	12	13	14	15	16	17
1977	Theodore Racing Hong Kong	N177	Ford Cosworth DFV 3.0 V8	G		ARG	BRA	RSA	USW	ESP	MON	BEL	SWE	FRA	GBR	GER	AUT	NED	ITA	USA	CAN	JPN
1977	Theodore Racing Hong Kong	N177	Ford Cosworth DFV 3.0 V8	G	(France) Patrick Tambay										Ret	6	Ret	5	Ret	DNQ	5	Ret
1978	Mario Deliotti Racing	N175	Ford Cosworth DFV 3.0 V8	G		ARG	BRA	RSA	USW	MON	BEL	ESP	SWE	FRA	GBR	GER	AUT	NED	ITA	USA	CAN	
1978	Mario Deliotti Racing	N175	Ford Cosworth DFV 3.0 V8	G	(United Kingdom) Geoff Lees										DNQ							
1978	Sachs Racing	N177	Ford Cosworth DFV 3.0 V8	G	(Austria) Harald Ertl											11	Ret	DNPQ	DNPQ			

=== Non-championship results ===
(key)

Year	Entrant	Chassis	Engine	Driver	1	2	3
1974	Team Ensign	N174	Ford Cosworth DFV 3.0 V8		PRE	ROC	INT
1974	Team Ensign	N174	Ford Cosworth DFV 3.0 V8	(Liechtenstein) Rikky von Opel		DNS	
1974	Team Ensign	N174	Ford Cosworth DFV 3.0 V8	(United Kingdom) Brian Redman			8
1975	Bewaking Team Ensign	N174	Ford Cosworth DFV 3.0 V8		ROC	INT	SUI
1975	Bewaking Team Ensign	N174	Ford Cosworth DFV 3.0 V8	(Netherlands) Roelof Wunderink	10	Ret	
1975	Bewaking Team Ensign	N175	Ford Cosworth DFV 3.0 V8	(New Zealand) Chris Amon			9
1976	Team Ensign	N174	Ford Cosworth DFV 3.0 V8		ROC	INT	
1976	Team Ensign	N174	Ford Cosworth DFV 3.0 V8	(New Zealand) Chris Amon	5		
1976	Team Ensign	N176	Ford Cosworth DFV 3.0 V8	(New Zealand) Chris Amon		Ret	
1977	Team Ensign	N177	Ford Cosworth DFV 3.0 V8		ROC		
1977	Team Ensign	N177	Ford Cosworth DFV 3.0 V8	(Switzerland) Clay Regazzoni	13		
1978	Tissot Ensign	N177	Ford Cosworth DFV 3.0 V8		INT		
1978	Tissot Ensign	N177	Ford Cosworth DFV 3.0 V8	(Belgium) Jacky Ickx	Ret		
1978	Tissot Ensign	N177	Ford Cosworth DFV 3.0 V8	(Italy) Lamberto Leoni	DNA		
1979	Smith & Jones	N174	Ford Cosworth DFV 3.0 V8		ROC	GNM	DIN
1979	Smith & Jones	N174	Ford Cosworth DFV 3.0 V8	(United Kingdom) Robin Smith	Ret		
1980	Unipart Racing Team	N180	Ford Cosworth DFV 3.0 V8		ESP		
1980	Unipart Racing Team	N180	Ford Cosworth DFV 3.0 V8	(France) Patrick Gaillard	6		
1980	?	N180	Ford Cosworth DFV 3.0 V8	(United Kingdom) Brian Henton	DNA		
1981	Ensign Racing	N180B	Ford Cosworth DFV 3.0 V8		RSA		
1981	Ensign Racing	N180B	Ford Cosworth DFV 3.0 V8	(Switzerland) Marc Surer	Ret		
