= René Arnoux =

French racing driver (born 1948)

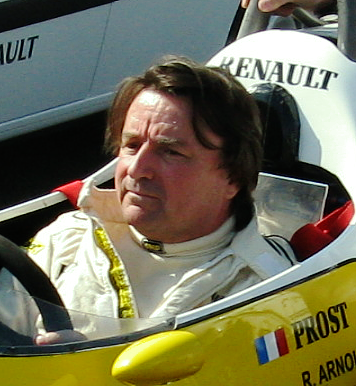
- Arnoux in 2008
- Born: René Alexandre Arnoux; 4 July 1948 (age 78); Pontcharra, Isère, France

Formula One World Championship career
- Nationality: (France) French
- Active years: 1978–1989
- Team(s): Martini, Surtees, Renault, Ferrari, Ligier
- Entries: 165 (149 starts)
- Championships: 0
- Wins: 7
- Podiums: 22
- Career points: 181
- Pole positions: 18
- Fastest laps: 12
- First entry: 1978 South African Grand Prix
- First win: 1980 Brazilian Grand Prix
- Last win: 1983 Dutch Grand Prix
- Last entry: 1989 Australian Grand Prix

René Alexandre Arnoux (French: [ʁəne alɛksɑ̃dʁ aʁnu]; born 4 July 1948) is a French former racing driver, who competed in Formula One from 1978 to 1989. Arnoux won seven Formula One Grands Prix across 12 seasons.

In 1977, Arnoux won the European Formula Two Championship. His best finish in the World Drivers' Championship was third in 1983 for Ferrari. Arnoux achieved seven wins, 12 fastest laps and 22 podiums in Formula One. His 18 pole positions is the third most for a non-World Champion.

Outside Formula One, Arnoux competed in the inaugural season of Grand Prix Masters in 2005.

== Early life and career ==
In 1973, Arnoux enrolled in Winfield Racing School and graduated as the top student with the prestigious Volant Shell Competition Scholarship, sponsored by Shell Oil for a free Formule Renault season. He moved into Formula Two in 1974 with Elf, taking fourth place on his debut at Nogaro. In 1975, he moved to Formula Super Renault and won the title. For 1976, Arnoux moved back to Formula Two with an Elf-sponsored, works Martini-Renault, winning three races and narrowly losing the title to Jean-Pierre Jabouille. However, he won the 1977 European Championship, again driving a Martini-Renault. Arnoux won races at Silverstone, Hockenheim, Pau and Nogaro, which along with second places at Enna-Pergusa and Estoril saw him finish 12 points clear of American Eddie Cheever who was driving for Ron Dennis' Project Four Racing, and 14 points clear of teammate Didier Pironi.

== Formula One ==
=== Martini and Surtees ===
Arnoux continued with the Martini team when it made the transition to Formula One in 1978. However, in an organisation with insufficient means to compete in the highest echelon of the sport, he was unable to demonstrate his abilities and Martini abandoned Formula One during the season, having run short of money. Arnoux's best finishes for Martini were two ninth places in Belgium and Austria. He failed to qualify in South Africa, and failed to pre-qualify in Monaco and Germany.

Arnoux moved to Surtees for the last two races of the season, but once again found himself in a team on the edge of failure. In his two races for the team, his best finish was his debut where he placed ninth at Watkins Glen for the United States Grand Prix. He qualified the Surtees TS20 in 21st place at Watkins Glen, while teammate Beppe Gabbiani failed to qualify. His last race for the team in Canada saw him qualify 16th but retire just after half distance when the Ford DFV engine failed. Surtees wanted to sign Arnoux on a permanent basis, but he secured a seat with Renault for 1979.

=== Renault ===
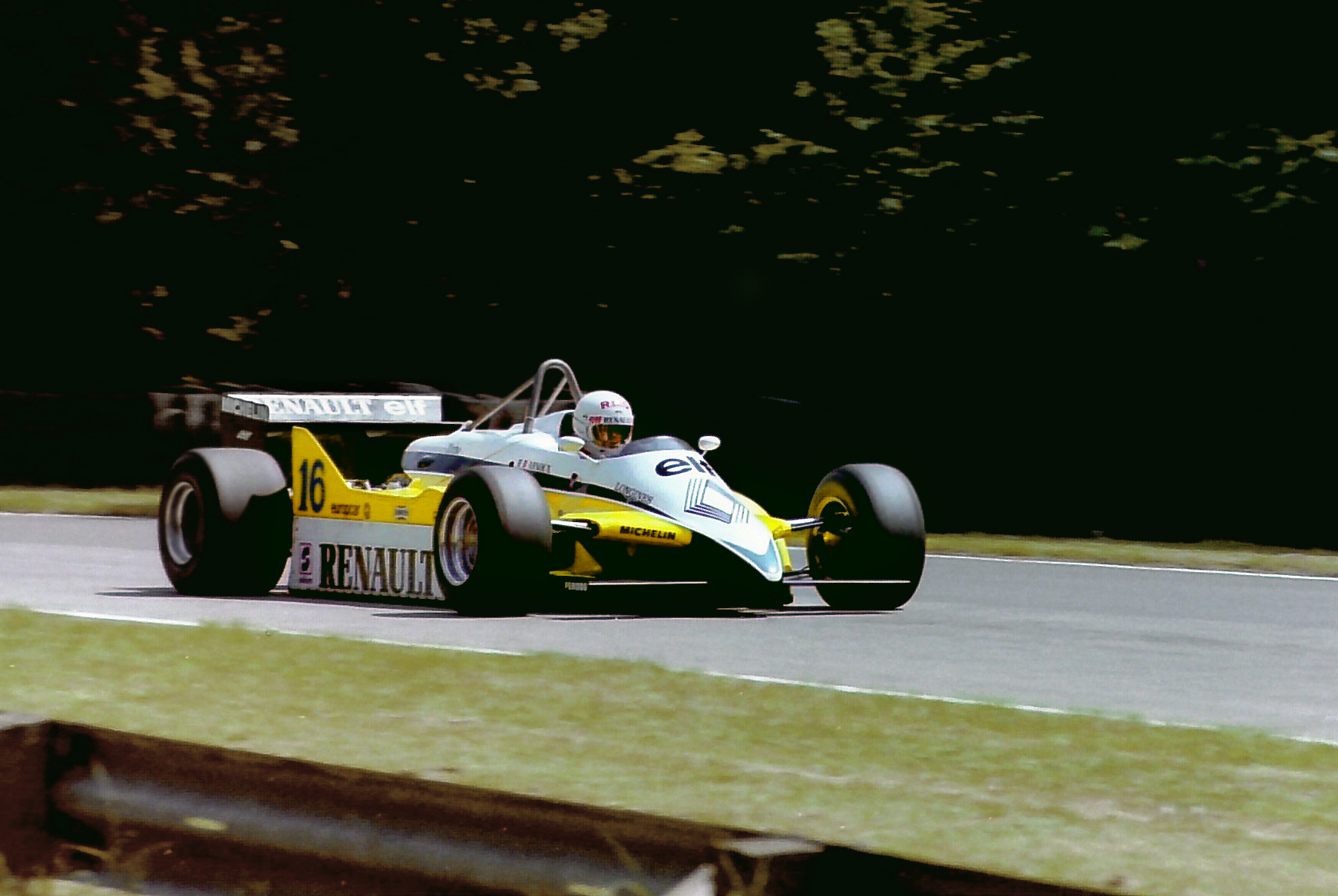
Arnoux at the 1982 British Grand Prix

In the 1979 season, the factory Renault team entered two cars for the first time since its debut in 1977. The team's only victory of the year was taken by Arnoux's teammate Jean-Pierre Jabouille at the French Grand Prix at the Dijon-Prenois circuit, but Arnoux took the headlines due to a fierce wheel-banging battle with the Flat-12 Ferrari of Gilles Villeneuve for second place, which Villeneuve won. In the second half of the season, Arnoux took four top-six finishes, including three podium places; Jabouille's Dijon victory was his only points finish of the year.

In 1980, Arnoux took his first two Formula One victories, the first being at Interlagos circuit in Brazil. His second win came in the very next race at the Kyalami circuit in South Africa, where the thinner air at high altitude gave the turbocharged Renault RE20 a power advantage over its mostly Cosworth-powered rivals. Following this race, Arnoux was leading the World Championship for the first time. He would not lose the championship lead until Round 6 in Monaco. The season though was punctuated by unreliability from the turbocharged Renault V6 engine. The unit was powerful, producing approximately 510 bhp (380 kW; 517 PS) to be on par with Ferrari (and considerably more powerful than the 475 bhp (354 kW; 482 PS) Ford DFV), but fragile, and the Renaults also lacked ground effects. Although he would later finish second in the Dutch Grand Prix at Zandvoort, he would finish the season in sixth place with 29 points, 38 points behind World Champion Alan Jones.

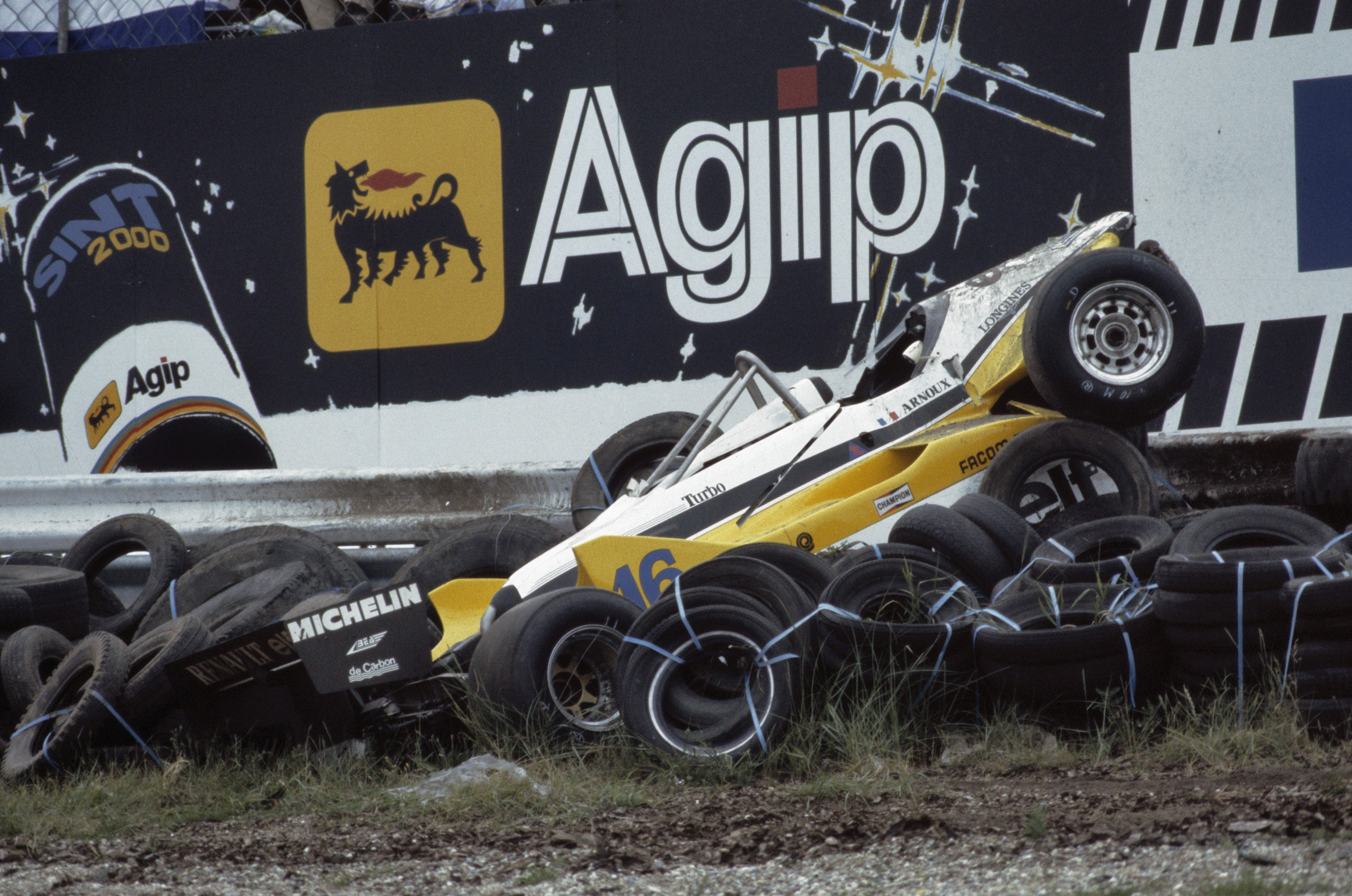
Arnoux survived a high-speed crash at the 1982 Dutch Grand Prix

Arnoux's situation was complicated in 1981 by the arrival of Alain Prost at Renault. Their rivalry on-track flared up off the track and relations between the two men deteriorated. The conflict reached its peak at the 1982 French Grand Prix at the Circuit Paul Ricard. The drivers took Renault's first one-two in Formula One, Arnoux finishing ahead of Prost. Prost was furious, considering that his teammate had not kept to the team orders agreed before the race, according to which he should have ceded the win to Prost, who was better placed in the 1982 championship. Arnoux replied that no orders had been given before the race and that he was free to drive his own race. He took one other win at the Italian Grand Prix at the end of the season. He suffered a high speed crash after losing a wheel going into the banked Tarzan corner at the end of the long straight in the 1982 Dutch Grand Prix, though his car's momentum was largely stopped by a sand trap and tyre barrier.

=== Ferrari ===
The pairing of Prost and Arnoux having become unsustainable, Arnoux left Renault at the end of 1982 to join Ferrari in 1983, joining another French driver Patrick Tambay. With three victories, at the Canadian, German, and Dutch Grands Prix, Arnoux was in contention for the world title until the final race of the season, the South African Grand Prix. He retired from that race with engine failure, and finished the season third, behind Nelson Piquet and Prost. Both Arnoux and Tambay became favourites with the Tifosi for their hard-charging styles, and their conjuncted results saw Ferrari win the 1983 Constructors' Championship. Arnoux's win at Zandvoort turned out to be the seventh and final win of his Formula One career.

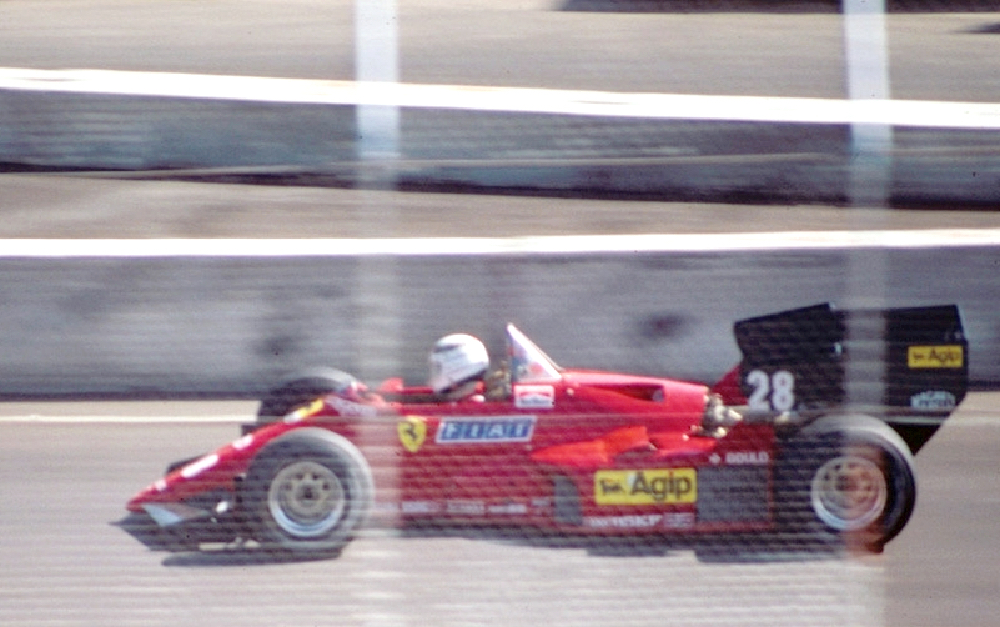
Arnoux started at the back of the field for the 1984 Dallas Grand Prix, but climbed to second by the finish.

With the McLarens of Prost and Niki Lauda dominating 1984, Arnoux had a less successful second season at Ferrari, only finishing sixth with 27 points, with his new teammate Michele Alboreto progressively taking the initiative and team leadership from him. After three wins and four pole positions in 1983, Arnoux failed to win or claim a pole position in 1984 (Alboreto won the Belgian Grand Prix from pole with Arnoux starting second and finishing third), though he finished second in San Marino and Dallas where he was forced to start from the pits due to an electrical fault on the warm-up lap and managed to keep his car out of trouble on the crumbling track. The only Grand Prix ever held in Dallas was also the last time Arnoux achieved a Formula One podium finish. As the season progressed, Arnoux appeared to lack motivation, and after finishing fourth in the opening race of the 1985 championship in Brazil, he left Ferrari by mutual consent. His place in the team was taken by Swedish driver Stefan Johansson. He was seen in the Brabham pits at Imola in Round 3, sparking rumours that he would join the team then owned by Bernie Ecclestone, but nothing came of it and he was rarely seen at races for the rest of the season.

=== Ligier ===
Without a drive for the rest of the 1985 season, Arnoux made his return to Formula One in 1986 for the French Ligier team who were using turbocharged Renault engines. The Pirelli-tyred Ligiers proved uncompetitive as the season progressed. Arnoux had two teammates in 1986. For the first half of the season his teammate was French driver Jacques Laffite. However, Laffite's career ended when he broke both of his legs in a first corner crash at Brands Hatch in the British Grand Prix. From the following race Laffite was replaced with another French driver, Philippe Alliot.

For 1987, Ligier were to have exclusive use of a new, 850 bhp (634 kW; 862 PS) four-cylinder turbocharged Alfa Romeo engine in the new Ligier JS29. However, after Arnoux compared the engine to "used food" during pre-season testing, Alfa's parent company Fiat pulled the plug on the project and Ligier were forced into using the four-cylinder Megatron engines for the season, which produced around 950 bhp (708 kW; 963 PS). Arnoux scored the team's only point during the season with a sixth place in Belgium. The race at Spa also saw the best finish for his teammate Piercarlo Ghinzani who finished seventh.

1988 was to prove the final year for turbos in Formula One and Ligier took the chance to race the new, 3.5-litre Judd V8 engine. The Ligier JS31 proved to be uncompetitive, with both Arnoux and new teammate Stefan Johansson failing to qualify several times. Both drivers complained that even in dry conditions the lack of grip saw them forced to drive with a wet weather technique. Arnoux failed to qualify twice during the season (San Marino and France, while Johansson failed to make the grid six times. Arnoux's best finish of the year was tenth place in the Portuguese Grand Prix. It was the first time since his debut season in 1978 that he had failed to score a World Championship point. His DNQ at Imola was the first time he had failed to qualify for a race since the 1981 Belgian Grand Prix. In the final race of the season in Adelaide, he took out race leader Gerhard Berger while being lapped at the 1988 Australian Grand Prix. Arnoux was criticised, but Berger said that he was experiencing a "very long" brake pedal which meant he could not stop to avoid Arnoux, nor pass him as easily as he normally would have. He also said that with his turbo boost turned up to full, the Ferrari would have run out of fuel long before the race ended.

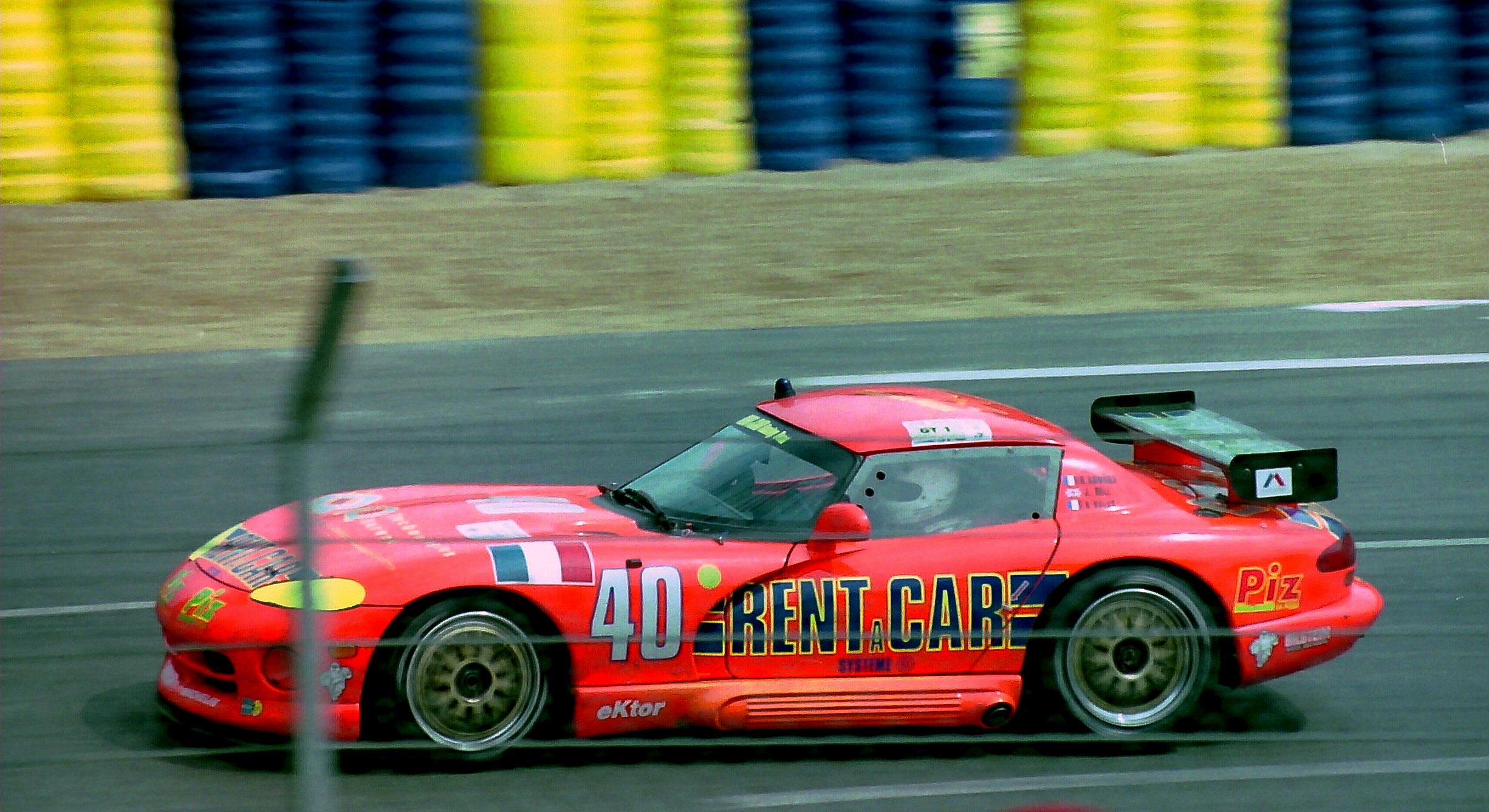
Arnoux driving at the 1994 24 Hours of Le Mans

In 1989, the new Ford DFR powered Ligier JS33 showed promise. Arnoux's driving had attracted some criticism, and he was frequently accused of not using his mirrors and blocking faster cars in qualifying and when being lapped. During the 1989 Monaco Grand Prix, BBC commentator Murray Walker remarked that Arnoux's claimed reason for going so slow at that stage of his career was that he was used to turbo powered cars and that the naturally aspirated cars were "a completely different kettle of fish to drive — he says". Walker's co-commentator, 1976 World Champion James Hunt said "And all I can say to that is bullshit". Arnoux received criticism after the race for holding up faster cars, with former Renault teammate Prost in particular held up by the Ligier which refused to let the McLaren past for a number of laps. This cost Prost some 20 seconds in his pursuit of teammate Ayrton Senna.

Arnoux finished his career with 181 World Championship points, with his last points coming from a fifth place at the 1989 Canadian Grand Prix. His last race was the very wet 1989 Australian Grand Prix in Adelaide. He was second fastest to the McLaren-Honda of outgoing World Champion and pole-sitter Ayrton Senna in the extra half-hour warm-up that was scheduled to let drivers and teams set up their cars for wet conditions after three days of sunny weather, but in the race, his Ligier was pushed into retirement by the Arrows of Eddie Cheever after four laps.

== Post-racing career ==
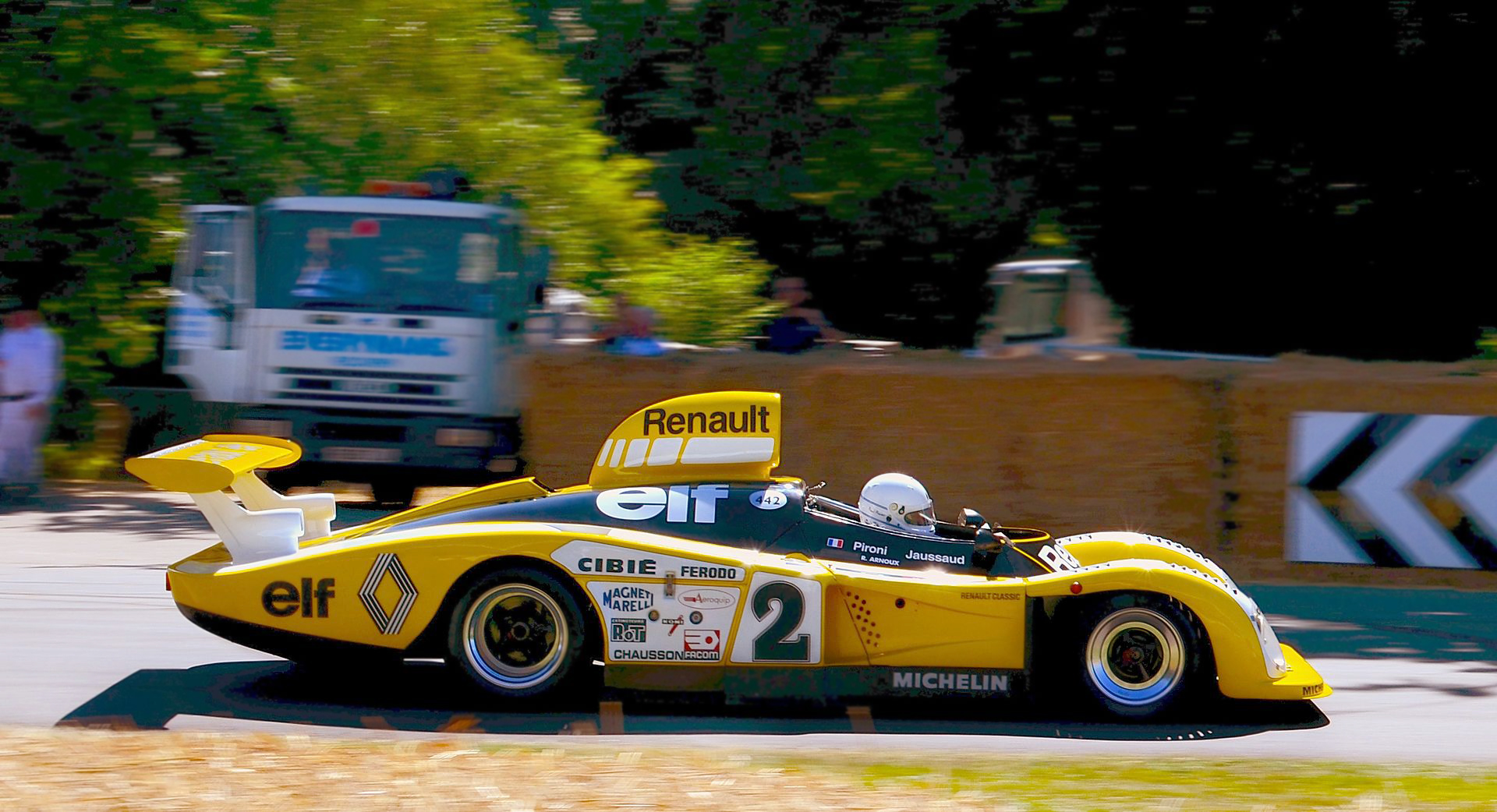
Arnoux demonstrating the Alpine A442B at the 2014 Goodwood Festival of Speed

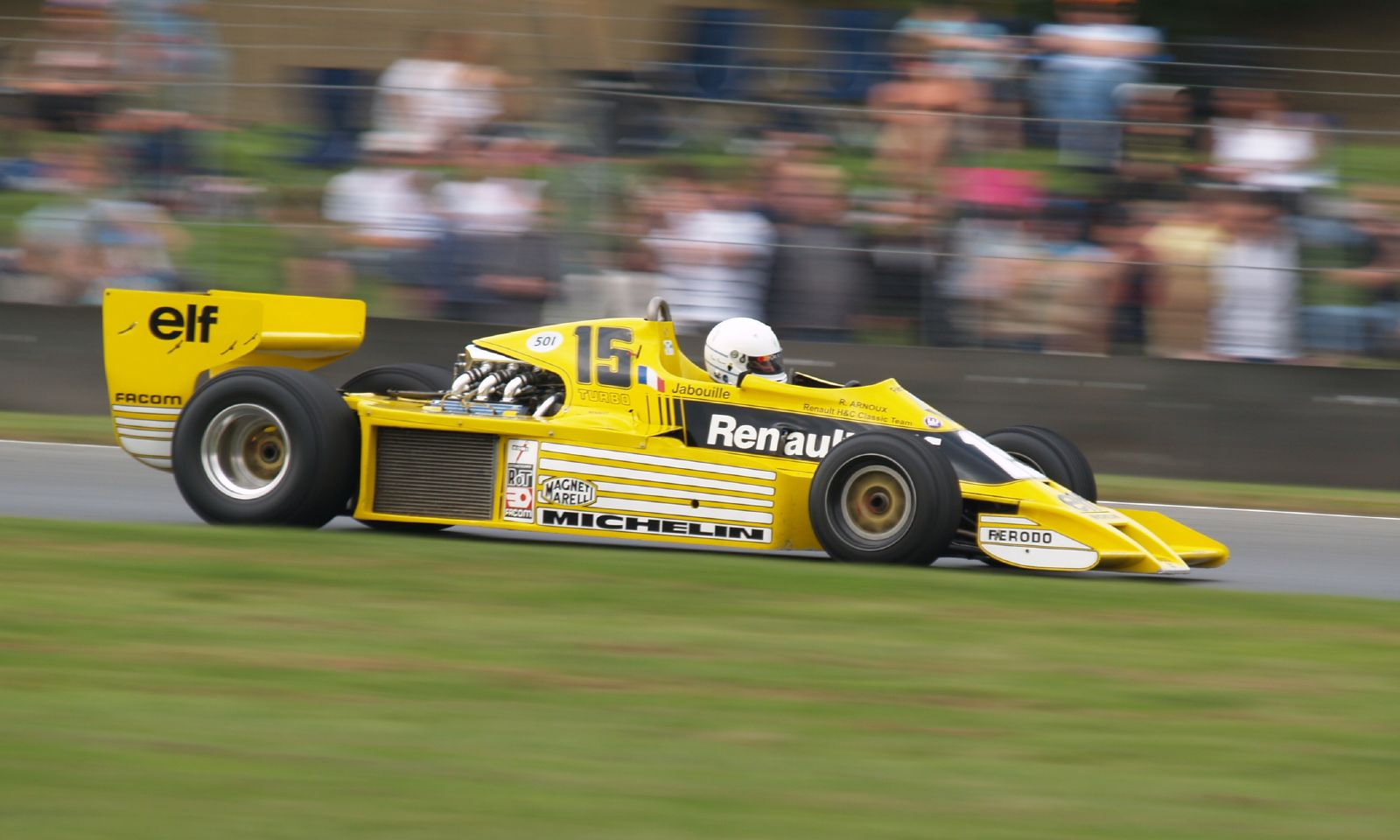
Jean-Pierre Jabouille's Renault RS01 of 1979 being demonstrated by René Arnoux in 2007

After retiring from driving, Arnoux started an indoor karting business, consisting of four tracks in France. He also owns and manages two factories, and frequently appears and drives in historical events on behalf of Renault.

Arnoux was one of the drivers invited to take part in the Grand Prix Masters championship in 2006 and 2007, restricted to former Formula One drivers. In 2007 and 2008 he drove for the Renault H&C Classic Team, when he presented and drove Alain Prost's F1 car from 1983 at World Series by Renault events.

== Racing record ==
=== Career summary ===
Season	Series	Team	Races	Wins	Poles	F/Laps	Podiums	Points	Position
1973	Challenge Européen de Formule Renault	Automobiles Martini	?	?	?	?	?	167	**1st**
1974	European Formula 5000	Tony Kitchiner	1	0	0	0	0	0	NC
1974	European Formula Two	Écurie Elf	1	0	0	0	0	0	NC
1974	World Sportscar Championship	Michel Dupont	1	0	0	0	0	0	NC
1975	Formula Super Renault	Automobiles Martini	?	?	?	?	?	159	**1st**
1976	European Formula Two	Automobiles Martini	12	3	1	6	6	52	**2nd**
1977	European Formula Two	Equipe Renault Elf	13	3	1	0	6	52	**1st**
1977	24 Hours of Le Mans	J. Haran de Chaunac	1	0	0	0	0	N/A	DNF
1978	Formula One	Automobiles Martini	4	0	0	0	0	0	NC
1978	Formula One	Durex Team Surtees	2	0	0	0	0	0	NC
1979	Formula One	Équipe Renault Elf	14	0	2	2	3	17	8th
1980	Formula One	Équipe Renault Elf	14	2	3	4	3	29	6th
1981	Formula One	Équipe Renault Elf	14	0	4	1	1	11	9th
1982	Formula One	Équipe Renault Elf	16	2	5	1	4	28	6th
1983	Formula One	Ferrari	15	3	4	2	7	49	**3rd**
1984	Formula One	Ferrari	16	0	0	2	4	27	6th
1985	Formula One	Ferrari	1	0	0	0	0	3	17th
1986	Formula One	Équipe Ligier	16	0	0	0	0	14	10th
1987	Formula One	Ligier Loto	14	0	0	0	0	1	19th
1988	Formula One	Ligier Loto	14	0	0	0	0	0	NC
1989	Formula One	Ligier Loto	9	0	0	0	0	2	23rd
1994	24 Hours of Le Mans	Rent-a-Car Racing Team	1	0	0	0	0	N/A	12th
1995	24 Hours of Le Mans	Euromotorsport Racing Inc.	1	0	0	0	0	N/A	DNF
2021	Historic Grand Prix of Monaco - Series F	Scuderia Ferrari	0	0	0	0	0	N/A	DNS

=== Complete European F5000 Championship results ===
(key) (Races in bold indicate pole position; races in italics indicate fastest lap.)

Year	Entrant	Chassis	Engine	1	2	3	4	5	6	7	8	9	10	11	12	13	14	15	16	17	18	Pos.	Pts
1974	Tony Kitchiner	McLaren M19A	Chevrolet 5.0 V8	BRH	MAL	SIL	OUL	BRH	ZOL	THR; Ret	ZAN	MUG	MNZ	MAL	MON	THR	BRH	OUL	SNE	MAL	BRH	NC	0

=== Complete European Formula Two Championship results ===
(key) (Races in bold indicate pole position; races in italics indicate fastest lap)

Year	Entrant	Chassis	Engine	1	2	3	4	5	6	7	8	9	10	11	12	13	Pos.	Pts
1974	Ecurie Elf	Alpine A367	BMW	BAR	HOC	PAU	SAL	HOC	MUG	KAR	PER	HOC	VLL; Ret				NC	0
1976	Automobiles Martini	Martini Mk 16	Renault	HOC; 2	THR; 7												2nd	52
1976	Automobiles Martini	Martini Mk 19	Renault			VLL; Ret	SAL; 4	PAU; 1	HOC; 5	ROU; 10	MUG; 2	PER; 1	**EST**; 1	NOG; Ret	HOC; 3		2nd	52
1977	Equipe Renault Elf	Martini Mk 22	Renault	SIL; 1	THR; Ret	HOC; 2	NÜR; 5	VLL; Ret	PAU; 1	MUG; 16	ROU; Ret	**NOG**; 1	PER; 2	MIS; Ret	EST; 2	DON; 6	1st	52

=== Complete Formula One World Championship results ===
(key) (Races in bold indicate pole position, Races in italics indicate fastest lap)

Year	Entrant	Chassis	Engine	1	2	3	4	5	6	7	8	9	10	11	12	13	14	15	16	WDC	Pts
1978	Automobiles Martini	Martini MK23	Ford Cosworth DFV 3.0 V8	ARG	BRA	RSA; DNQ	USW	MON; DNPQ	BEL; 9	ESP	SWE	FRA; 14	GBR; WD	GER; DNPQ	AUT; 9	NED; Ret	ITA			NC	0
1978	Durex Team Surtees	Surtees TS20	Ford Cosworth DFV 3.0 V8															USA; 9	CAN; Ret	NC	0
1979	Équipe Renault Elf	Renault RS01	Renault-Gordini EF1 1.5 V6t	ARG; Ret	BRA; Ret	RSA; Ret	USW; DNS	ESP; 9	BEL; Ret											8th	17
1979	Équipe Renault Elf	Renault RS10	Renault-Gordini EF1 1.5 V6t							MON; Ret	FRA; 3	GBR; 2	GER; Ret	**AUT**; 6	**NED**; Ret	ITA; Ret	CAN; Ret	USA; 2		8th	17
1980	Équipe Renault Elf	Renault RE20	Renault-Gordini EF1 1.5 V6t	ARG; Ret	BRA; 1	RSA; 1	USW; 9	BEL; 4	MON; Ret	FRA; 5	GBR; NC	GER; Ret	**AUT**; 9	**NED**; 2	**ITA**; 10	CAN; Ret	USA; 7			6th	29
1981	Équipe Renault Elf	Renault RE20B	Renault-Gordini EF1 1.5 V6t	USW; 8	BRA; Ret	ARG; 5	SMR; 8	BEL; DNQ												9th	11
1981	Équipe Renault Elf	Renault RE30	Renault-Gordini EF1 1.5 V6t						MON; Ret	ESP; 9	**FRA**; 4	**GBR**; 9	GER; 13	**AUT**; 2	NED; Ret	**ITA**; Ret	CAN; Ret	CPL; Ret		9th	11
1982	Équipe Renault Elf	Renault RE30B	Renault-Gordini EF1 1.5 V6t	**RSA**; 3	BRA; Ret	USW; Ret	**SMR**; Ret	BEL; Ret	**MON**; Ret	DET; 10	CAN; Ret	**NED**; Ret	GBR; Ret	**FRA**; 1	GER; 2	AUT; Ret	SUI; 16†	ITA; 1	CPL; Ret	6th	28
1983	Ferrari	Ferrari 126C2B	Ferrari 021 1.5 V6t	BRA; 10	USW; 3	FRA; 7	**SMR**; 3	MON; Ret	BEL; Ret	**DET**; Ret	**CAN**; 1	**GBR**; 5								**3rd**	**49**
1983	Ferrari	Ferrari 126C3	Ferrari 021 1.5 V6t										GER; 1	AUT; 2	NED; 1	ITA; 2	EUR; 9	RSA; Ret		**3rd**	**49**
1984	Ferrari	Ferrari 126C4	Ferrari 031 1.5 V6t	BRA; Ret	RSA; Ret	BEL; 3	SMR; 2	FRA; 4	MON; 3^{‡}	CAN; 5	DET; Ret	DAL; 2	GBR; 6	GER; 6	AUT; 7	NED; 11†	ITA; Ret	EUR; 5	POR; 9	6th	27
1985	Ferrari	Ferrari 156/85	Ferrari 031 1.5 V6t	BRA; 4	POR	SMR	MON	CAN	DET	FRA	GBR	GER	AUT	NED	ITA	BEL	EUR	RSA	AUS	17th	3
1986	Équipe Ligier	Ligier JS27	Renault EF4B 1.5 V6t	BRA; 4	ESP; Ret	SMR; Ret	MON; 5	BEL; Ret	CAN; 6	DET; Ret	FRA; 5	GBR; 4	GER; 4	HUN; Ret	AUT; 10	ITA; Ret	POR; 7	MEX; 15†	AUS; 7	10th	14
1987	Ligier Loto	Ligier JS29B	Megatron M12/13 1.5 L4t	BRA	SMR; DNS	BEL; 6	MON; 11	DET; 10												19th	1
1987	Ligier Loto	Ligier JS29C	Megatron M12/13 1.5 L4t						FRA; Ret	GBR; Ret	GER; Ret	HUN; Ret	AUT; 10	ITA; 10	POR; Ret	ESP; Ret	MEX; Ret	JPN; Ret	AUS; Ret	19th	1
1988	Ligier Loto	Ligier JS31	Judd CV 3.5 V8	BRA; Ret	SMR; DNQ	MON; Ret	MEX; Ret	CAN; Ret	DET; Ret	FRA; DNQ	GBR; 18	GER; 17	HUN; Ret	BEL; Ret	ITA; 13	POR; 10	ESP; Ret	JPN; 17	AUS; Ret	NC	0
1989	Ligier Loto	Ligier JS33	Ford Cosworth DFR 3.5 V8	BRA; DNQ	SMR; DNQ	MON; 12	MEX; 14	USA; DNQ	CAN; 5	FRA; Ret	GBR; DNQ	GER; 11	HUN; DNQ	BEL; Ret	ITA; 9	POR; 13	ESP; DNQ	JPN; DNQ	AUS; Ret	23rd	2
Sources:

- ^{‡} Race was stopped with less than 75% of laps completed, half points awarded.

=== Complete Formula One Non-Championship results ===
(key) (Races in italics indicate fastest lap)

Year	Entrant	Chassis	Engine	1
1978	Automobiles Martini	Martini MK23	Ford Cosworth DFV 3.0 V8	INT; DNS
1983	Scuderia Ferrari SpA SEFAC	Ferrari 126C2B	Ferrari 021 1.5 V6t	ROC; Ret

=== 24 Hours of Le Mans results ===
Year	Team	Co-Drivers	Car	Class	Laps	Pos.	Class Pos.
1977	(France) J. Haran de Chaunac	(France) Didier Pironi (France) Guy Fréquelin	Renault Alpine A442	S +2.0	0	DNF	DNF
1994	(France) Rent-a-Car Racing Team	(United Kingdom) Justin Bell (France) Bertrand Balas	Dodge Viper RT/10	GT1	273	12th	**3rd**
1995	(United States) Euromotorsport Racing Inc.	(Italy) Massimo Sigala (United States) Jay Cochran	Ferrari 333 SP	WSC	7	DNF	DNF

=== Complete Grand Prix Masters results ===
(key) Races in bold indicate pole position, races in italics indicate fastest lap.

Year	Team	Chassis	Engine	1	2	3	4	5
2005	Team Golden Palace	Delta Motorsport GPM	Nicholson McLaren 3.5 V8	RSA; Ret				
2006	Team Golden Palace	Delta Motorsport GPM	Nicholson McLaren 3.5 V8	QAT; 9	ITA; C	GBR; 9	MAL; C	RSA; C

== Sources ==
- Profile at GrandPrix.com

Sporting positions
Preceded by Jean-Pierre Jabouille	European Formula Two; Champion; 1977	Succeeded by Bruno Giacomelli
