= 1979 French Grand Prix =

Formula One motor race held on 1 July 1979

- Race 8 of 15 in the 1979 Formula One season

Race details
- Date: July 1, 1979
- Location: Dijon
- Course length: 3.801 km (2.361 miles)
- Distance: 80 laps, 304.08 km (188.88 miles)
- Weather: Dry

Pole position
Driver	(France) Jean-Pierre Jabouille	Renault
- Time: 1:07.19

Fastest lap
Driver	(France) René Arnoux	Renault
- Time: 1:09.16 on lap 71

Podium
First	(France) Jean-Pierre Jabouille	Renault
Second	(Canada) Gilles Villeneuve	Ferrari
Third	(France) René Arnoux	Renault

The 1979 French Grand Prix was a Formula One motor race held on 1 July 1979 at Dijon-Prenois near Dijon, France.

It marked not just the first victory of a forced-induction car in Formula One since the Alfa Romeo 159's victory at the Spanish Grand Prix in 1951, but also the first victory of a turbocharged car in Formula One, with Renault overcoming the reliability problems that had initially plagued their car. For Jean-Pierre Jabouille it was a victory on home soil, driving a French car (Renault), on French tyres (Michelin), powered by a French engine (Renault), burning French fuel (Elf). Jabouille was the first Frenchman to win the French Grand Prix since Jean-Pierre Wimille in 1948.

The race featured one of the fiercest battles ever for second place, between Ferrari driver Gilles Villeneuve and Renault driver René Arnoux, who on several occasions during the final laps touched wheels and swapped positions. The fight is often cited as one of the most memorable pieces of racing in Formula One. Villeneuve, who passed the finish line less than a quarter of a second ahead of Arnoux, later described the occasion as "my best memory of Grand Prix racing".

== Qualifying ==
=== Qualifying classification ===
Pos.	Driver	Constructor	Time	No
1	Jean-Pierre Jabouille	Renault	1:07,19	1
2	René Arnoux	Renault	1:07,45	2
3	Gilles Villeneuve	Ferrari	1:07,65	3
4	Nelson Piquet	Brabham-Alfa Romeo	1:08,13	4
5	Jody Scheckter	Ferrari	1:08,15	5
6	Niki Lauda	Brabham-Alfa Romeo	1:08,20	6
7	Alan Jones	Williams-Ford	1:08,23	7
8	Jacques Laffite	Ligier-Ford	1:08,55	8
9	Clay Regazzoni	Williams-Ford	1:08,65	9
10	Jean-Pierre Jarier	Tyrrell-Ford	1:08,80	10
11	Didier Pironi	Tyrrell-Ford	1:08,95	11
12	Mario Andretti	Lotus-Ford	1:09,35	12
13	Carlos Reutemann	Lotus-Ford	1:09,36	13
14	Jacky Ickx	Ligier-Ford	1:09,68	14
15	John Watson	McLaren-Ford	1:09,97	15
16	Keke Rosberg	Wolf-Ford	1:10,15	16
17	Bruno Giacomelli	Alfa Romeo	1:10,59	17
18	Emerson Fittipaldi	Fittipaldi-Ford	1:10,61	18
19	Riccardo Patrese	Arrows-Ford	1:10,70	19
20	Patrick Tambay	McLaren-Ford	1:10,92	20
21	Jan Lammers	Shadow-Ford	1:11,14	21
22	Jochen Mass	Arrows-Ford	1:11,40	22
23	Hans-Joachim Stuck	ATS-Ford	1:11,75	DNS
24	Héctor Rebaque	Lotus-Ford	1:11,97	23
25	Elio de Angelis	Shadow-Ford	1:12,23	24
DNQ	Patrick Gaillard	Ensign-Ford	1:13,00	—
DNQ	Arturo Merzario	Merzario-Ford	1:14,95	—

== Race ==
=== Classification ===
Pos	No	Driver	Constructor	Tyre	Laps	Time/Retired	Grid	Points
1	15	(France) Jean-Pierre Jabouille	Renault	MI	80	1:35:20.42	1	9
2	12	(Canada) Gilles Villeneuve	Ferrari	MI	80	+ 14.59	3	6
3	16	(France) René Arnoux	Renault	MI	80	+ 14.83	2	4
4	27	(Australia) Alan Jones	Williams-Ford	G	80	+ 36.61	7	3
5	4	(France) Jean-Pierre Jarier	Tyrrell-Ford	G	80	+ 1:04.51	10	2
6	28	(Switzerland) Clay Regazzoni	Williams-Ford	G	80	+ 1:05.51	9	1
7	11	(South Africa) Jody Scheckter	Ferrari	MI	79	+ 1 Lap	5	
8	26	(France) Jacques Laffite	Ligier-Ford	G	79	+ 1 Lap	8	
9	20	(Finland) Keke Rosberg	Wolf-Ford	G	79	+ 1 Lap	16	
10	8	(France) Patrick Tambay	McLaren-Ford	G	78	+ 2 Laps	20	
11	7	(United Kingdom) John Watson	McLaren-Ford	G	78	+ 2 Laps	15	
12	31	(Mexico) Héctor Rebaque	Lotus-Ford	G	78	+ 2 Laps	23	
13	2	(Argentina) Carlos Reutemann	Lotus-Ford	G	77	+ 3 Laps	13	
14	29	(Italy) Riccardo Patrese	Arrows-Ford	G	77	+ 3 Laps	19	
15	30	(West Germany) Jochen Mass	Arrows-Ford	G	75	+ 5 Laps	22	
16	18	(Italy) Elio de Angelis	Shadow-Ford	G	75	+ 5 Laps	24	
17	35	(Italy) Bruno Giacomelli	Alfa Romeo	G	75	+ 5 Laps	17	
18	17	(Netherlands) Jan Lammers	Shadow-Ford	G	73	+ 7 Laps	21	
Ret	3	(France) Didier Pironi	Tyrrell-Ford	G	71	Suspension	11	
Ret	14	(Brazil) Emerson Fittipaldi	Fittipaldi-Ford	G	53	Engine	18	
Ret	6	(Brazil) Nelson Piquet	Brabham-Alfa Romeo	G	52	Accident	4	
Ret	1	(United States) Mario Andretti	Lotus-Ford	G	51	Brakes	12	
Ret	25	(Belgium) Jacky Ickx	Ligier-Ford	G	45	Engine	14	
Ret	5	(Austria) Niki Lauda	Brabham-Alfa Romeo	G	23	Spun Off	6	
DNS	9	(West Germany) Hans-Joachim Stuck	ATS-Ford	G		Tyre Dispute		
DNQ	22	(France) Patrick Gaillard	Ensign-Ford	G				
DNQ	24	(Italy) Arturo Merzario	Merzario-Ford	G				

== Notes ==
- This was the Formula One World Championship debut for French driver Patrick Gaillard.
- This race marked the 25th Grand Prix start for Renault and a Renault-powered car. It was also the first fastest lap set, podium finish and Grand Prix win for the French team and engine supplier.

== Championship standings after the race ==
Drivers' Championship standings

	Pos	Driver	Points
	1	(South Africa) Jody Scheckter	30 (34)
1	2	(Canada) Gilles Villeneuve	26
1	3	(France) Jacques Laffite	24
	4	(France) Patrick Depailler	20 (22)
	5	(Argentina) Carlos Reutemann	20 (25)

Constructors' Championship standings

Pos	Constructor	Points
1	(Italy) Ferrari	60
2	(France) Ligier-Ford	46
3	(United Kingdom) Lotus-Ford	37
4	(United Kingdom) Tyrrell-Ford	17
5	(United Kingdom) Williams-Ford	14

- Note: Only the top five positions are included for both sets of standings. Only the best 4 results from the first 7 races and the best 4 results from the last 8 races counted towards the Drivers' Championship. Numbers without parentheses are Championship points; numbers in parentheses are total points scored.

Previous race: 1979 Monaco Grand Prix	FIA Formula One World Championship; 1979 season	Next race: 1979 British Grand Prix
Previous race: 1978 French Grand Prix	French Grand Prix	Next race: 1980 French Grand Prix
