= 1979 Austrian Grand Prix =

Formula One motor race

- Race 11 of 15 in the 1979 Formula One season

Race details
- Date: August 12, 1979
- Official name: XVII Großer Preis von Österreich
- Location: Österreichring
- Course: Permanent racing facility
- Course length: 5.942 km (3.692 miles)
- Distance: 54 laps, 320.814 km (199.368 miles)
- Weather: Dry

Pole position
Driver	(France) René Arnoux	Renault
- Time: 1:34.07

Fastest lap
Driver	(France) René Arnoux	Renault
- Time: 1:35.77 on lap 40

Podium
First	(Australia) Alan Jones	Williams-Ford
Second	(Canada) Gilles Villeneuve	Ferrari
Third	(France) Jacques Laffite	Ligier-Ford

The 1979 Austrian Grand Prix was a Formula One motor race held on 12 August 1979 at Österreichring.

== Qualifying ==
=== Qualifying classification ===
Pos.	Driver	Constructor	Time	No
1	René Arnoux	Renault	1:34.07	1
2	Alan Jones	Williams-Ford	1:34.28	2
3	Jean-Pierre Jabouille	Renault	1:34.45	3
4	Niki Lauda	Brabham-Alfa Romeo	1:35.51	4
5	Gilles Villeneuve	Ferrari	1:35.70	5
6	Clay Regazzoni	Williams-Ford	1:35.82	6
7	Nelson Piquet	Brabham-Alfa Romeo	1:35.85	7
8	Jacques Laffite	Ligier-Ford	1:35.92	8
9	Jody Scheckter	Ferrari	1:36.10	9
10	Didier Pironi	Tyrrell-Ford	1:36.26	10
11	Derek Daly	Tyrrell-Ford	1:36.42	11
12	Keke Rosberg	Wolf-Ford	1:36.67	12
13	Riccardo Patrese	Arrows-Ford	1:36.71	13
14	Patrick Tambay	McLaren-Ford	1:36.72	14
15	Mario Andretti	Lotus-Ford	1:37.11	15
16	John Watson	McLaren-Ford	1:37.16	16
17	Carlos Reutemann	Lotus-Ford	1:37.32	17
18	Hans-Joachim Stuck	ATS-Ford	1:37.93	18
19	Emerson Fittipaldi	Fittipaldi-Ford	1:38.38	19
20	Jochen Mass	Arrows-Ford	1:38.85	20
21	Jacky Ickx	Ligier-Ford	1:39.31	21
22	Elio de Angelis	Shadow-Ford	1:39.44	22
23	Jan Lammers	Shadow-Ford	1:39.45	23
24	Patrick Gaillard	Ensign-Ford	1:41.10	24
DNQ	Héctor Rebaque	Lotus-Ford	1:41.16	—
DNQ	Arturo Merzario	Merzario-Ford	1:45.75	—

== Race ==
=== Classification ===
Pos	No	Driver	Constructor	Tyre	Laps	Time/Retired	Grid	Points
1	27	(Australia) Alan Jones	Williams-Ford	G	54	1:27:38.01	2	9
2	12	(Canada) Gilles Villeneuve	Ferrari	MI	54	+36.05 secs	5	6
3	26	(France) Jacques Laffite	Ligier-Ford	G	54	+46.77 secs	8	4
4	11	(South Africa) Jody Scheckter	Ferrari	MI	54	+47.21 secs	9	3
5	28	(Switzerland) Clay Regazzoni	Williams-Ford	G	54	+48.92 secs	6	2
6	16	(France) René Arnoux	Renault	MI	53	+1 Lap	1	1
7	3	(France) Didier Pironi	Tyrrell-Ford	G	53	+1 Lap	10	
8	4	(Republic of Ireland) Derek Daly	Tyrrell-Ford	G	53	+1 Lap	11	
9	7	(United Kingdom) John Watson	McLaren-Ford	G	53	+1 Lap	16	
10	8	(France) Patrick Tambay	McLaren-Ford	G	53	+1 Lap	14	
Ret	5	(Austria) Niki Lauda	Brabham-Alfa Romeo	G	45	Engine	4	
Ret	22	(France) Patrick Gaillard	Ensign-Ford	G	42	Suspension	24	
Ret	29	(Italy) Riccardo Patrese	Arrows-Ford	G	34	Suspension	13	
Ret	18	(Italy) Elio de Angelis	Shadow-Ford	G	34	Engine	22	
Ret	6	(Brazil) Nelson Piquet	Brabham-Alfa Romeo	G	32	Engine	7	
Ret	9	(West Germany) Hans-Joachim Stuck	ATS-Ford	G	28	Engine	18	
Ret	25	(Belgium) Jacky Ickx	Ligier-Ford	G	26	Engine	21	
Ret	2	(Argentina) Carlos Reutemann	Lotus-Ford	G	22	Handling	17	
Ret	15	(France) Jean-Pierre Jabouille	Renault	MI	16	Gearbox	3	
Ret	20	(Finland) Keke Rosberg	Wolf-Ford	G	15	Electrical	19	
Ret	14	(Brazil) Emerson Fittipaldi	Fittipaldi-Ford	G	15	Brakes	12	
Ret	17	(Netherlands) Jan Lammers	Shadow-Ford	G	3	Accident	23	
Ret	30	(West Germany) Jochen Mass	Arrows-Ford	G	1	Engine	20	
Ret	1	(United States) Mario Andretti	Lotus-Ford	G	0	Clutch	15	
DNQ	31	(Mexico) Héctor Rebaque	Lotus-Ford	G				
DNQ	24	(Italy) Arturo Merzario	Merzario-Ford	G				

== Notes ==
- This was the 50th Grand Prix start for a Canadian driver.

== Championship standings after the race ==
Drivers' Championship standings

	Pos	Driver	Points
	1	(South Africa) **Jody Scheckter***	38 (42)
	2	(Canada) **Gilles Villeneuve***	32
	3	(France) **Jacques Laffite***	32
3	4	(Australia) **Alan Jones***	25
1	5	(Switzerland) **Clay Regazzoni***	24

Constructors' Championship standings

Pos	Constructor	Points
1	(Italy) **Ferrari***	74
2	(France) **Ligier-Ford***	55
3	(United Kingdom) **Williams-Ford***	49
4	(United Kingdom) Lotus-Ford	37
5	(United Kingdom) Tyrrell-Ford	21

- Note: Only the top five positions are included for both sets of standings. Only the best 4 results from the first 7 races and the best 4 results from the last 8 races counted towards the Drivers' Championship. Numbers without parentheses are Championship points; numbers in parentheses are total points scored.
- Competitors in bold and marked with an asterisk still had a theoretical chance of becoming World Champion.

Previous race: 1979 German Grand Prix	FIA Formula One World Championship; 1979 season	Next race: 1979 Dutch Grand Prix
Previous race: 1978 Austrian Grand Prix	Austrian Grand Prix	Next race: 1980 Austrian Grand Prix
