= 1979 Dutch Grand Prix =

- Race 12 of 15 in the 1979 Formula One season

Race details
- Date: August 26, 1979
- Official name: XXVI Grote Prijs van Nederland
- Location: Zandvoort
- Course: Permanent racing facility
- Course length: 4.226 km (2.626 miles)
- Distance: 75 laps, 316.95 km (196.95 miles)
- Weather: Dry

Pole position
Driver	(France) René Arnoux	Renault
- Time: 1:15.461

Fastest lap
Driver	(Canada) Gilles Villeneuve	Ferrari
- Time: 1:19.438 on lap 39

Podium
First	(Australia) Alan Jones	Williams-Ford
Second	(South Africa) Jody Scheckter	Ferrari
Third	(France) Jacques Laffite	Ligier-Ford

The 1979 Dutch Grand Prix was a Formula One motor race held on 26 August 1979 at Zandvoort.

== Summary ==
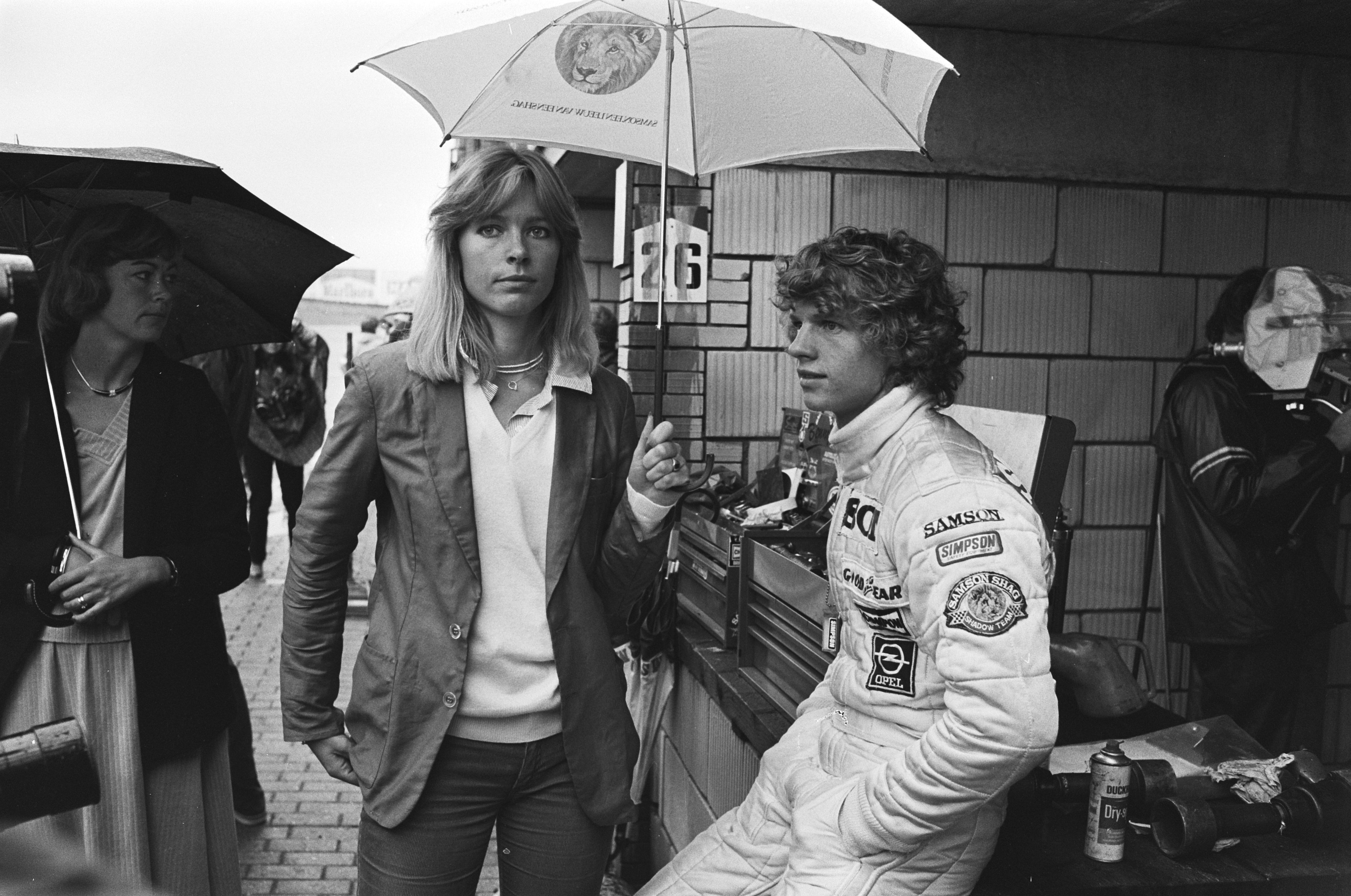
Jan Lammers debuting in F1

René Arnoux put his Renault on pole position but the slow start of the turbocharged car allowed Alan Jones to break free. Arnoux and Clay Regazzoni collided, eliminating the Williams on the spot while the poleman only lasted to the end of the lap as he limped back to the pits. Jody Scheckter fell to last place on the first lap and began the task of working through the field. Gilles Villeneuve, who made it through the first lap ahead of Jean-Pierre Jabouille, passed Jones at Tarzan on lap 11. He gave the lead back to Jones when he spun on lap 47. On lap 51, just after passing the pits, Villeneuve's left rear tyre exploded causing him to spin. He regained control to begin one of the wildest laps in history. He drove an entire lap on two tyres, the right front was in the air and the left rear was shredding rubber and sparking with the pavement. Reaction was mixed. It was either an act of the ultimate competitor not wanting to give up or an irresponsible, emotional decision. Either way he was out as his suspension was too damaged to rejoin the race. Jones finished first giving him his third consecutive and Williams their fourth consecutive victory. However, Scheckter worked his way up to finish second and due to Jones' poor performance in the first half of the season thanks to the Williams only getting quicker halfway through the season, Ferrari driver only needed 4 more points to ensure a Ferrari would win the driver's title.

== Classification ==
=== Qualifying ===
Pos.	No.	Driver	Constructor	Q1	Q2	Gap
1	16	(France) René Arnoux	Renault	1:17.100	1:15.461	—
2	27	(Australia) Alan Jones	Williams-Ford	1:16.883	1:15.646	+0.185
3	28	(Switzerland) Clay Regazzoni	Williams-Ford	1:16.316	1:16.228	+0.767
4	15	(France) Jean-Pierre Jabouille	Renault	1:16.338	1:16.304	+0.843
5	11	(South Africa) Jody Scheckter	Ferrari	1:17.313	1:16.392	+0.931
6	12	(Canada) Gilles Villeneuve	Ferrari	1:16.939	1:16.946	+1.478
7	26	(France) Jacques Laffite	Ligier-Ford	1:17.129	1:17.639	+1.668
8	20	(Finland) Keke Rosberg	Wolf-Ford	1:18.180	1:17.280	+1.819
9	5	(Austria) Niki Lauda	Brabham-Alfa Romeo	1:17.661	1:17.495	+2.034
10	3	(France) Didier Pironi	Tyrrell-Ford	1:18.398	1:17.625	+2.164
11	6	(Brazil) Nelson Piquet	Brabham-Alfa Romeo	1:17.821	1:17.667	+2.206
12	7	(United Kingdom) John Watson	McLaren-Ford	1:21.799	1:17.750	+2.289
13	2	(Argentina) Carlos Reutemann	Lotus-Ford	1:18.671	1:18.001	+2.540
14	8	(France) Patrick Tambay	McLaren-Ford	1:21.892	1:18.147	+2.686
15	9	(West Germany) Hans-Joachim Stuck	ATS-Ford	1:20.581	1:18.256	+2.795
16	4	(France) Jean-Pierre Jarier	Tyrrell-Ford	1:18.946	1:18.430	+2.969
17	1	(United States) Mario Andretti	Lotus-Ford	1:18.896	1:18.452	+2.991
18	30	(West Germany) Jochen Mass	Arrows-Ford	1:18.817	1:18.606	+3.145
19	29	(Italy) Riccardo Patrese	Arrows-Ford	1:20.051	1:18.629	+3.168
20	25	(Belgium) Jacky Ickx	Ligier-Ford	1:18.706	1:19.143	+3.245
21	14	(Brazil) Emerson Fittipaldi	Fittipaldi-Ford	1:21.005	1:19.433	+3.972
22	18	(Italy) Elio de Angelis	Shadow-Ford	1:21.065	1:20.709	+5.248
23	17	(Netherlands) Jan Lammers	Shadow-Ford	1:23.404	1:21.084	+5.623
24	31	(Mexico) Héctor Rebaque	Lotus-Ford	1:21.502	1:21.344	+5.883
DNQ	22	(France) Patrick Gaillard	Ensign-Ford	1:37.600	1:22.922	+7.461
DNQ	24	(Italy) Arturo Merzario	Merzario-Ford	1:23.613	-	+8.152

=== Race ===
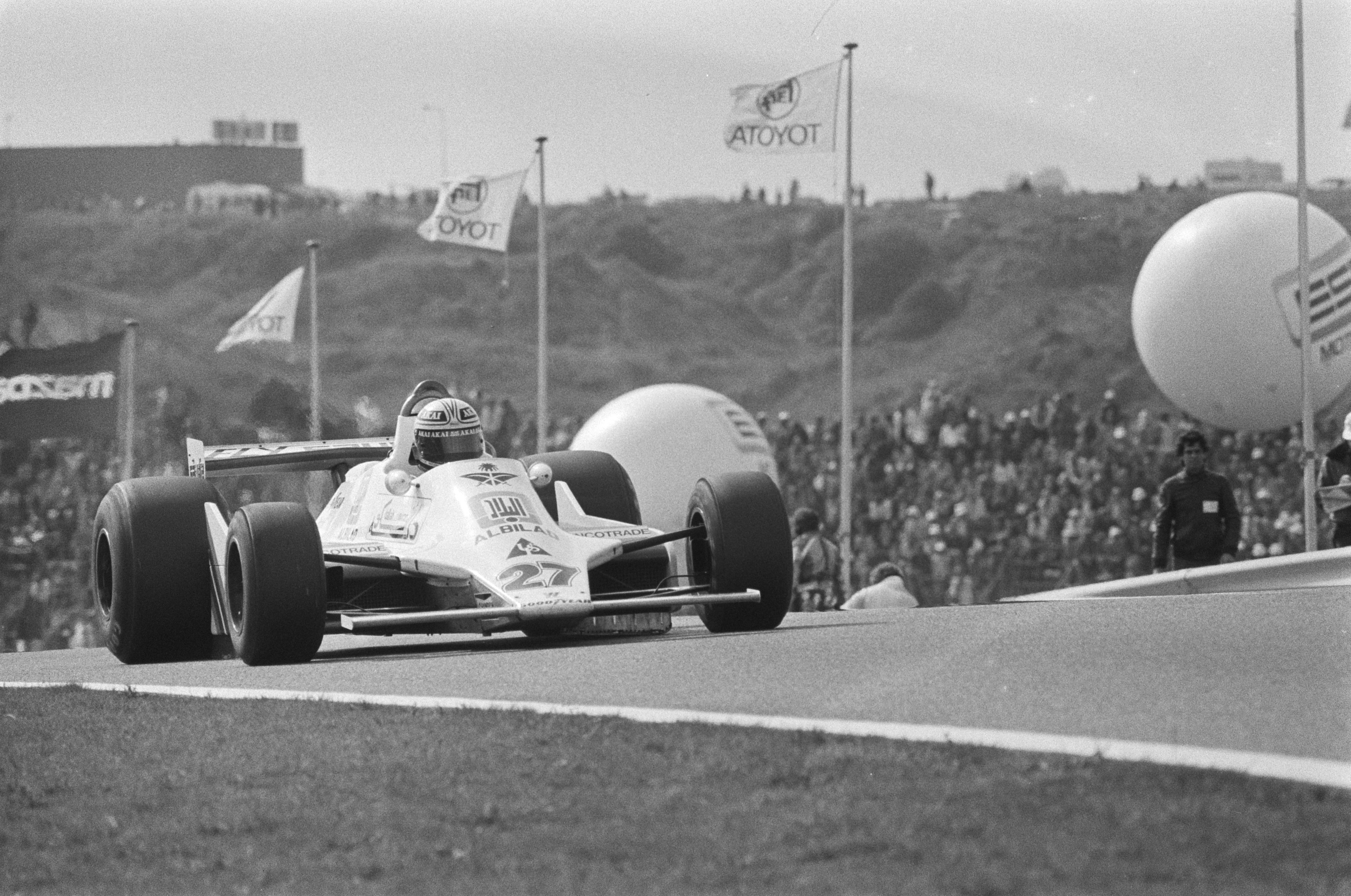
Alan Jones at the 1979 Dutch Grand Prix

Pos	No	Driver	Constructor	Tyre	Laps	Time/Retired	Grid	Points
1	27	(Australia) Alan Jones	Williams-Ford	G	75	1:41:19.775	2	9
2	11	(South Africa) Jody Scheckter	Ferrari	MI	75	+21.783	5	6
3	26	(France) Jacques Laffite	Ligier-Ford	G	75	+1:03.253	7	4
4	6	(Brazil) Nelson Piquet	Brabham-Alfa Romeo	G	74	+1 Lap	11	3
5	25	(Belgium) Jacky Ickx	Ligier-Ford	G	74	+1 Lap	20	2
6	30	(West Germany) Jochen Mass	Arrows-Ford	G	73	+2 Laps	18	1
7	31	(Mexico) Héctor Rebaque	Lotus-Ford	G	73	+2 Laps	24	
Ret	3	(France) Didier Pironi	Tyrrell-Ford	G	51	Suspension	10	
Ret	12	(Canada) Gilles Villeneuve	Ferrari	MI	49	Tyre	6	
Ret	18	(Italy) Elio de Angelis	Shadow-Ford	G	40	Transmission	22	
Ret	20	(Finland) Keke Rosberg	Wolf-Ford	G	33	Engine	8	
Ret	15	(France) Jean-Pierre Jabouille	Renault	MI	26	Clutch	4	
Ret	7	(United Kingdom) John Watson	McLaren-Ford	G	22	Engine	12	
Ret	4	(France) Jean-Pierre Jarier	Tyrrell-Ford	G	20	Spun Off	16	
Ret	9	(West Germany) Hans-Joachim Stuck	ATS-Ford	G	19	Transmission	15	
Ret	17	(Netherlands) Jan Lammers	Shadow-Ford	G	12	Gearbox	23	
Ret	1	(United States) Mario Andretti	Lotus-Ford	G	9	Suspension	17	
Ret	29	(Italy) Riccardo Patrese	Arrows-Ford	G	7	Brakes	19	
Ret	8	(France) Patrick Tambay	McLaren-Ford	G	6	Engine	14	
Ret	5	(Austria) Niki Lauda	Brabham-Alfa Romeo	G	4	Withdrew	9	
Ret	14	(Brazil) Emerson Fittipaldi	Fittipaldi-Ford	G	2	Electrical	21	
Ret	2	(Argentina) Carlos Reutemann	Lotus-Ford	G	1	Suspension	13	
Ret	16	(France) René Arnoux	Renault	MI	1	Suspension	1	
Ret	28	(Switzerland) Clay Regazzoni	Williams-Ford	G	0	Collision	3	
DNQ	22	(France) Patrick Gaillard	Ensign-Ford	G				
DNQ	24	(Italy) Arturo Merzario	Merzario-Ford	G				

== Notes ==
- This was the 100th Grand Prix start for Shadow. In those 100 races, Shadow had won 1 Grand Prix, achieved 7 podium finishes, 3 pole positions and 2 fastest laps.
- This was the 5th pole position for Renault and a Renault-powered car.
- This was the 300th Grand Prix start for a Ferrari-powered car. In those 300 races, a Ferrari-powered car had won 77 Grands Prix, achieved 253 podium finishes, 89 pole positions, 88 fastest laps, 23 Grand Slams and won 8 Driver's and 5 Constructor's Championships.

== Championship standings after the race ==
Drivers' Championship standings

	Pos	Driver	Points
	1	(South Africa) **Jody Scheckter***	44 (48)
1	2	(France) **Jacques Laffite***	36
1	3	(Australia) **Alan Jones***	34
2	4	(Canada) **Gilles Villeneuve***	32
	5	(Switzerland) **Clay Regazzoni***	24

Constructors' Championship standings

Pos	Constructor	Points
1	(Italy) **Ferrari***	80
2	(France) **Ligier-Ford***	61
3	(United Kingdom) **Williams-Ford***	58
4	(United Kingdom) Lotus-Ford	37
5	(United Kingdom) Tyrrell-Ford	21

- Note: Only the top five positions are included for both sets of standings. Only the best 4 results from the first 7 races and the best 4 results from the last 8 races counted towards the Drivers' Championship. Numbers without parentheses are Championship points; numbers in parentheses are total points scored.
- Competitors in bold and marked with an asterisk still had a theoretical chance of becoming World Champion.

Previous race: 1979 Austrian Grand Prix	FIA Formula One World Championship; 1979 season	Next race: 1979 Italian Grand Prix
Previous race: 1978 Dutch Grand Prix	Dutch Grand Prix	Next race: 1980 Dutch Grand Prix
