= McLaren M26 =

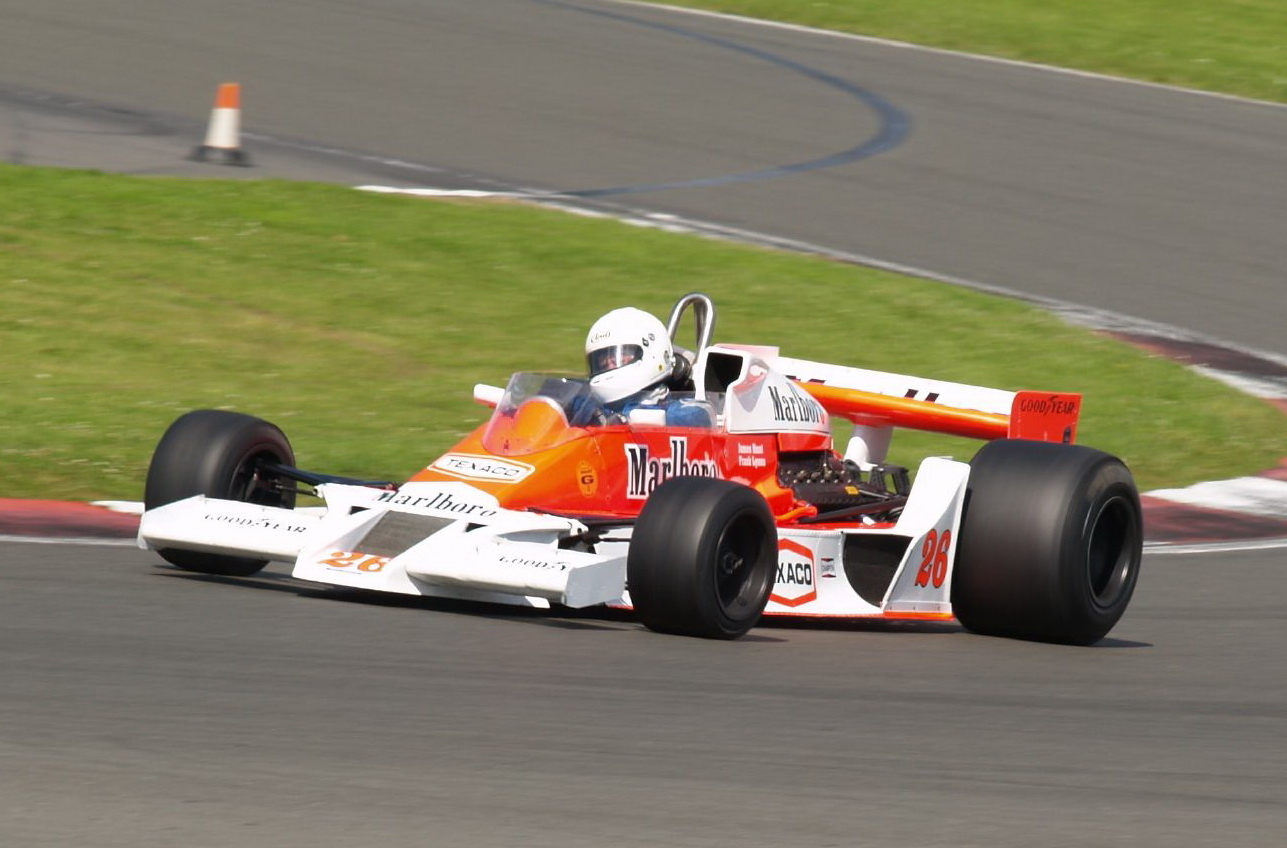
- Category: Formula One
- Constructor: McLaren Racing
- Designers: Gordon Coppuck; Steve Harvey (Design Engineer); Dave Quill (Design Engineer); Ray Stokoe (Design Engineer)
- Predecessor: M23
- Successor: M28

Technical specifications
- Chassis: Aluminium monocoque.
- Suspension (front): Double wishbone, with inboard coilover shock absorbers.
- Suspension (rear): Double wishbone.
- Axle track: F: 65 in (165 cm); R: 64 in (163 cm)
- Wheelbase: 108 in (274 cm)
- Engine: Ford-Cosworth DFV 2,993 cc (182.6 cu in) 90° V8, naturally aspirated, mid-mounted.
- Transmission: Hewland DG400 6-speed manual gearbox.
- Weight: 585 kg (1,290 lb)
- Fuel: Texaco
- Tyres: Goodyear

Competition history
- Notable entrants: Marlboro Team McLaren
- Notable drivers: (West Germany) Jochen Mass (United Kingdom) James Hunt (France) Patrick Tambay (Italy) Bruno Giacomelli
- Debut: 1976 Dutch Grand Prix
Races	Wins	Poles	F/Laps
31	3	3	1
- Unless otherwise stated, all data refer to Formula One World Championship Grands Prix only.

The McLaren M26 was a Formula One racing car designed by Gordon Coppuck for the McLaren team, to replace the aging McLaren M23 model. The car was designed to be a lighter and lower car than its predecessor, with a smaller frontal area and narrower monocoque. Coppuck began design work in early 1976, with a view to introducing the car in the mid season.

== Design and competition history ==
Upon first tests by Jochen Mass, problems with the cooling were encountered and Coppuck had to redesign the radiator installation for more effective airflow. After the changes were made, Mass resumed testing the car, and the M26 made its debut at the Dutch Grand Prix that year in his hands. After the first race was completed with the car, it was decided amongst the team that the car needed further design work done, especially to the nose section and the M26 was not used again during 1976.

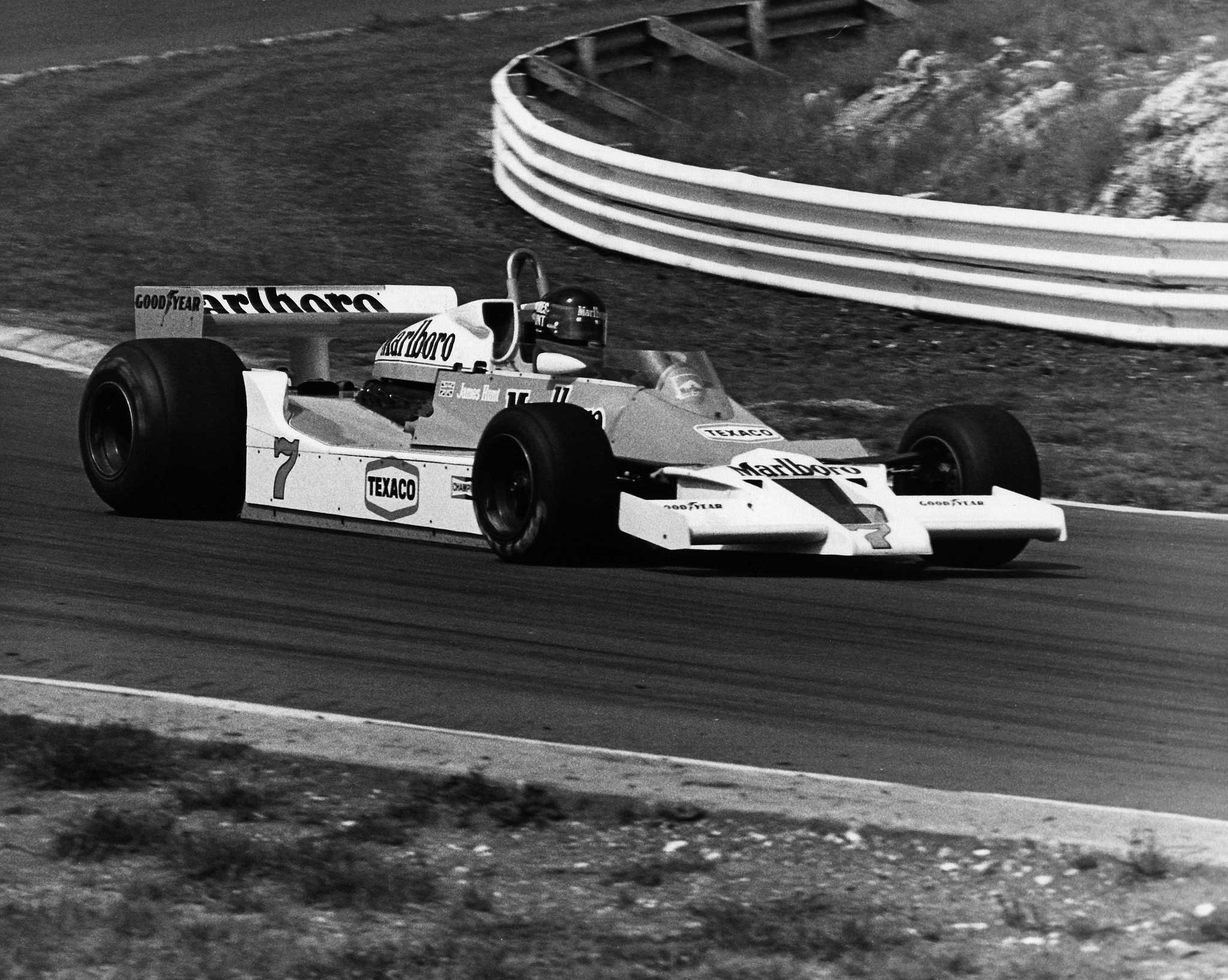
James Hunt driving a McLaren M26 in the 1978 British Grand Prix at Brands Hatch.

McLaren relied on the M23 during the rest of the season and for the first few races of 1977 until it was deemed necessary that the M26 was to race in light of the wilting performance of its predecessor. The redesigned car made its debut at the Spanish Grand Prix, where it proved to be a solid, if unspectacular performer. James Hunt, who initially hated the car knuckled down to improve the race pace and reliability of the M26, and throughout the season the car's performance improved noticeably. Hunt won three times during the course of the season, and scored two other podium finishes in the second half of the season. Two other potential victories were lost in Austria and Canada, the first with through reliability issues, and the second when Hunt collided with his own teammate and backmarker Mass while trying to give him a lap advantage (after the incident, a Canadian track marshal went to remove Hunt from the area, and Hunt, angry, punched him in the face, and then apologized); in both he was leading easily. At season's end, McLaren had scored 69 points and were third in the constructors' championship.

The M26 was updated for the 1978 season and Mass was replaced by Patrick Tambay. But after a promising start to the season for Hunt, things began to go drastically wrong for him and for the McLaren team. Lotus introduced their ground breaking Lotus 79 and the M26 was immediately obsolete. Hunt tried too hard in several races making up for the performance deficit which led to race ending retirements, but the pure superiority of the Lotus caused his motivation to fall. Coppuck did an extensive redesign in the mid season, turning the M26 into a partial ground effect car dubbed the M26E. He enlarged the sidepods for the ground effect venturis, redesigned the suspension and added smaller wings front and rear, but there was no improvement in the cars' form and without a test driver to sort the cars' issues, the team's fortunes sunk even further.

The M26 was retired after a couple of runs in early 1979. The slow decline of McLaren had begun and it would not be until 1981 that the team would win again.

In all, the M26 won three races and scored 86 points in its career.

In 1980 Tiga rebuilt an M26 as a full ground effects car and it was re-engined with a five-litre Chevrolet engine and raced as a Formula 5000. Alfredo Costanzo used this car to win the 1981 Australian Drivers' Championship.

In 2009 Bobby Verdon-Roe won the FIA Historic Formula One Championship driving a McLaren M26.

== Complete Formula One World Championship results ==
(key) (results in bold indicate pole position; results in italics indicate fastest lap)

Year	Entrant	Engine	Tyres	Drivers	1	2	3	4	5	6	7	8	9	10	11	12	13	14	15	16	17	Points	WCC
1976	Marlboro Team McLaren	Cosworth DFV; 3.0 V8	G		BRA	RSA	USW	ESP	BEL	MON	SWE	FRA	GBR	GER	AUT	NED	ITA	CAN	USA	JPN		**74 (75)***	2nd
1976	Marlboro Team McLaren	Cosworth DFV; 3.0 V8	G	Jochen Mass												9						**74 (75)***	2nd
1977	Marlboro Team McLaren	Cosworth DFV; 3.0 V8	G		ARG	BRA	RSA	USW	ESP	MON	BEL	SWE	FRA	GBR	GER	AUT	NED	ITA	USA	CAN	JPN	**60***	3rd
1977	Marlboro Team McLaren	Cosworth DFV; 3.0 V8	G	James Hunt					Ret		7	12	3	**1**	Ret	Ret	Ret	**Ret**	**1**	Ret	1	**60***	3rd
1977	Marlboro Team McLaren	Cosworth DFV; 3.0 V8	G	Jochen Mass										4	Ret	6	Ret	4	Ret	3	Ret	**60***	3rd
1978	Marlboro Team McLaren	Cosworth DFV; 3.0 V8	G		ARG	BRA	RSA	USW	MON	BEL	ESP	SWE	FRA	GBR	GER	AUT	NED	ITA	USA	CAN		**15**	8th
1978	Marlboro Team McLaren	Cosworth DFV; 3.0 V8	G	James Hunt	4	Ret	Ret	Ret	Ret	Ret	6	8	3	Ret	DSQ	Ret	10	Ret	7	Ret		**15**	8th
1978	Marlboro Team McLaren	Cosworth DFV; 3.0 V8	G	Patrick Tambay	6	Ret	Ret	12	7		Ret	4	9	6	Ret	Ret	9	5	6	8		**15**	8th
1978	Marlboro Team McLaren	Cosworth DFV; 3.0 V8	G	Bruno Giacomelli						8			Ret	7			Ret	14				**15**	8th
1978	Liggett Group / B & S Fabrications	Cosworth DFV; 3.0 V8	G	Brett Lunger					DNPQ	7	DNQ	DNQ	Ret	8	DNPQ	8	Ret	Ret				**15**	8th
1979	Marlboro Team McLaren	Cosworth DFV; 3.0 V8	G		ARG	BRA	RSA	USW	ESP	BEL	MON	FRA	GBR	GER	AUT	NED	ITA	CAN	USA			**15***	7th
1979	Marlboro Team McLaren	Cosworth DFV; 3.0 V8	G	Patrick Tambay		Ret				DNQ												**15***	7th

* All points in 1976 scored using the McLaren M23
* 21 points in 1977 scored using the McLaren M23
* All points in 1979 scored using the McLaren M28 and McLaren M29
