= Brabham BT46 =

Formula One racing car

Brabham BT46 Brabham BT46B
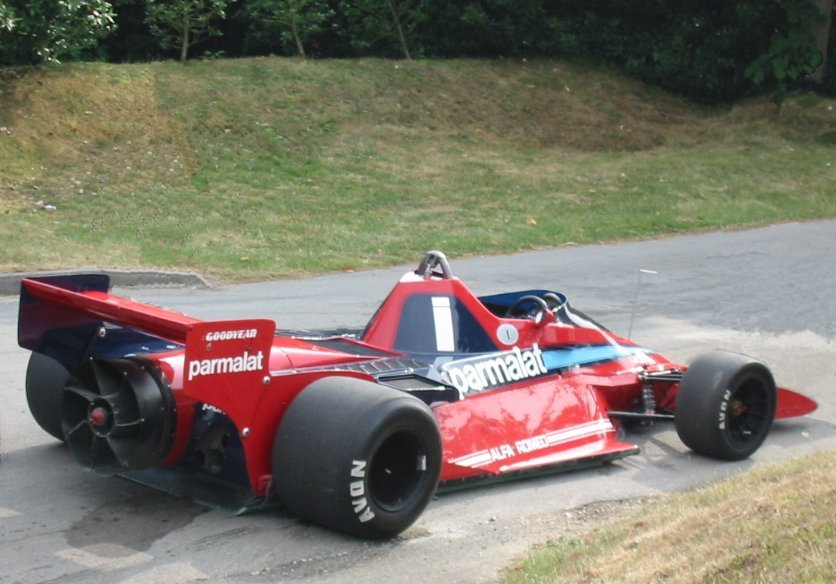
- BT46B "fan car" at Goodwood Festival of Speed, 2001
- Category: Formula One
- Constructor: Brabham
- Designers: Gordon Murray; David Cox; Carlo Chiti (Engine designer (Alfa Romeo))
- Predecessor: BT45C
- Successor: BT48

Technical specifications
- Chassis: Aluminium Monocoque
- Suspension (front): Pullrod double wishbone
- Suspension (rear): Pullrod double wishbone
- Axle track: Front: 1,549 mm (61.0 in); Rear: 1,626 mm (64.0 in)
- Wheelbase: 2,590 mm (102 in)
- Engine: Alfa Romeo, 2,995 cc (182.8 cu in), Flat-12, NA, Mid-engine, longitudinally-mounted
- Transmission: Brabham / Alfa Romeo 5/6-speed manual, Alfa Romeo Differential
- Power: 520 hp (387.8 kW) @ 12,000 rpm
- Fuel: Fina; Agip
- Tyres: Goodyear

Competition history
- Notable entrants: Parmalat Racing Team
- Notable drivers: 1. (Austria) Niki Lauda; 2. (United Kingdom) John Watson; 66. (Brazil) Nelson Piquet
- Debut: 1978 South African Grand Prix
- First win: 1978 Swedish Grand Prix
- Last win: 1978 Italian Grand Prix
- Last event: 1979 Argentine Grand Prix
Races	Wins	Poles
15 (all variants)	BT46 – 1 BT46B – 1	2
- Constructors' Championships: 0
- Drivers' Championships: 0

The Brabham BT46 is a Formula One racing car designed by Gordon Murray for the Brabham team, owned by Bernie Ecclestone, for the 1978 Formula One season. The car featured several radical design elements, one of which was the use of flat panel heat exchangers on the bodywork of the car to replace conventional water and oil radiators. It was removed before the car's race debut, never to be seen again. The cars, powered by a flat-12 Alfa Romeo engine, raced competitively with modified nose-mounted radiators for most of the year, driven by Niki Lauda and John Watson, winning one race in this form and scoring sufficient points for the team to finish third in the constructors' championship.

The "B" variant of the car, also known as the "fan car", was introduced at the 1978 Swedish Grand Prix as a counter to the dominant ground effect Lotus 79. The BT46B generated an immense amount of downforce utilizing a fan, claimed to be for increased cooling, but which also extracted air from beneath the car. The car only raced once in this configuration in the Formula One World Championship—when with it Niki Lauda won the 1978 Swedish Grand Prix at Anderstorp.

The "fan car" concept was withdrawn by Brabham after one race even though the FIA had ruled it could be used for the remainder of that season. Murray, Brabham's chief designer, later said that the car was withdrawn by Brabham due to concerns from Bernie Ecclestone, the team owner. Ecclestone became chief executive of the Formula One Constructors' Association (FOCA) in the same year that the Brabham BT46 appeared, and he was concerned that the upset from other teams over the fan car could collapse FOCA. Murray said in 2008 that Ecclestone "was working on getting his foothold in the Formula One Constructors’ Association and launching himself towards what he's doing now", with the words "what he's doing now" referring to Ecclestone's position as chief executive of the Formula One Group, which he held from 1987 until 2017.

== BT46 ==
=== Concept ===
The first Alfa Romeo-engined Brabham, the Brabham BT45 was an overweight and bulky car, initially weighing 625 kg and as wide as was permitted under the F1 technical regulations. This was due to the difficulties of packaging the large, powerful Alfa flat-12 engine and the fuel it required to complete a race distance. After lengthy development, it became competitive, but never won a race. In mid-1977, Brabham designer Gordon Murray started work on the ambitious design of the BT46. It was intended to compensate for the weight of the engine and fuel and allow the Brabham team to take a large technical step forward as well as to improve safety.

=== Engine and transmission ===
Alfa Romeo's sportscar-derived flat-12 engine had a capacity of 2995 cc and employed fuel injection and electronic ignition. The engine featured a cast magnesium alloy engine block with aluminium alloy crankcase and magnesium or aluminium cylinder heads. There were four gear-driven valves per cylinder. In Formula One form by 1978 it delivered about 520 bhp at 12,000 rpm, about 50 bhp more than the Cosworth DFV engines used by most teams, as well as a peak 324 lb-ft of torque (439 N·m). However the power came at the expense of greater size, increased fuel and oil consumption and about 40 kg more weight. The engine was also difficult to work with, with significant variations in dimensions between units. The car used a revised and lighter version of the 6-speed gearbox designed for the BT45B. Brabham designed the gearbox casing, which was cast by Alfa Romeo and used Hewland gears.

=== Chassis and suspension ===
The BT46 was an aluminium alloy monocoque featuring the trapezoidal cross section common to many of Gordon Murray's 1970s designs. It featured inbuilt pneumatic jacks fed from an external supply of compressed air to lift it off the ground for tyre changes during practice. It employed a very early version of the carbon brakes that were in universal use by the mid-1980s—a concept taken from the aircraft industry. The system, which Brabham had been developing since 1976, combined carbon composite brake pads with a steel disc faced with carbon composite pucks.

The most radical feature of the original car was its use of flat plate heat exchangers mounted flush to the surface of the bodywork in place of conventional water radiators. The absence of standard radiators allowed Murray to compensate somewhat for the large engine and fuel tanks and produce a relatively light design with a low frontal cross section (important to reduce drag). Upon seeing pictures of the car, consultant engineer David Cox calculated that the BT46 had only around 30% of the cooling surface area required. He contacted Brabham to express his concerns. By this time the car had already run, suffering serious problems with over-heating. Cox was invited by the team to discuss his calculations, pointed out what he believed to be fundamental errors in the concept and concluded that the idea could not be made to work. The heat exchangers were replaced by more standard radiators in the nose of the car, similar to that of the BT45, compromising its aerodynamic efficiency. In addition to the question of drag the nose-mounted radiators moved weight towards the front of the car.

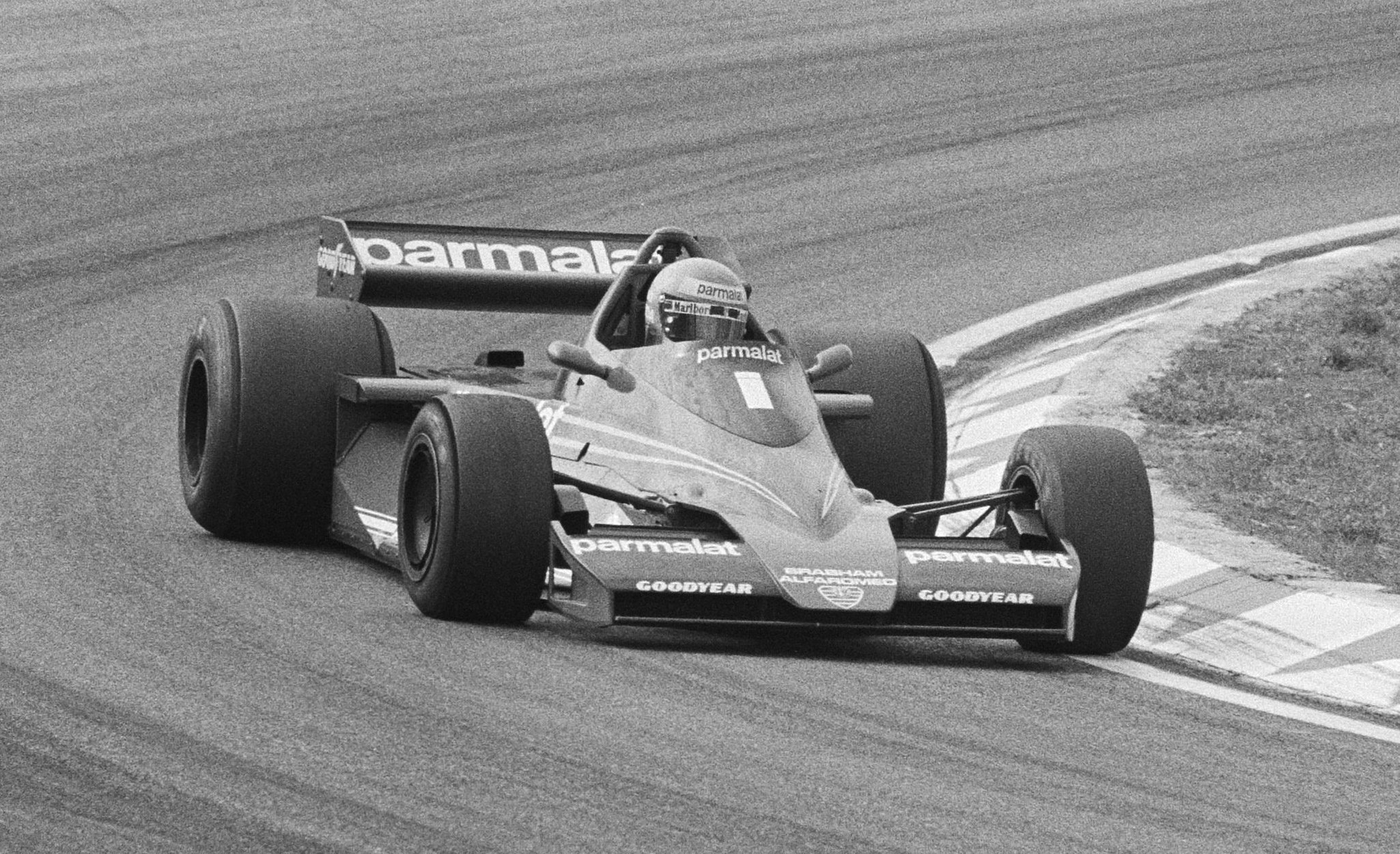
Brabham BT46 driven by Niki Lauda at the 1978 Dutch Grand Prix

=== Racing history ===
The BT46 debuted at the third race of the 1978 season, the South African Grand Prix on 4 March 1978, with the revised nose-mounted radiators. The cars were immediately competitive, although reliability was suspect. After the winning debut and subsequent withdrawal of the BT46B "fan car" at the Swedish Grand Prix, the Brabham team completed the season with the standard BT46s. Niki Lauda winning the Italian Grand Prix in the standard car, albeit after Mario Andretti and Gilles Villeneuve were penalised a minute for jumping the second race start after Ronnie Peterson’s fatal accident at the first start.

The BT46 appeared for the last time in the Formula One World Championship at the first round of the 1979 season in the hands of Nelson Piquet. Niki Lauda also used the car to qualify for that race, as the new BT48 was proving troublesome, although he did race the new car. Piquet retired on the first lap after a multi-car collision that wrecked the BT46.

== BT46B – the fan car ==
=== Concept ===
Lotus had introduced the concept of ground effect to the Formula One world championship in 1977 with their fast, but not always reliable, Type 78. Peter Wright and Colin Chapman had discovered that by carefully shaping the underside of the car, they could accelerate the air passing under the car, thereby reducing the air pressure under the car relative to that over it and pushing the tyres down harder onto the track. The increased downforce gave more grip and thus higher cornering speeds. Ground effect had the great advantage of being a low drag solution, unlike conventional wings, meaning that the increased cornering ability was not compromised by a decrease in straight line speed. In 1978 Lotus ironed out the reliability problems and further developed the concept from relatively simple sidepods with a wing profile into full venturi tunnels under the car. As soon as they appeared at Zolder, the black and gold Type 79s of Mario Andretti and Ronnie Peterson outpaced the opposition by a comfortable margin.

It had not been clear to other designers just what Wright and Chapman had done with the Type 78, but by early 1978, Gordon Murray had grasped how the Lotus design was achieving its remarkable levels of grip. He also realised that the Alfa Romeo flat-12 engine used by Brabham that season was too wide to permit the Venturi tunnels needed for really significant ground effect. At Murray's instigation, Alfa went on to produce a V12 engine for the 1979 season. In the meantime, Murray's idea was to use another way of reducing the pressure underneath the car. In 1970 the Chaparral 2J "sucker car" had proved significantly faster than its opposition in the North American Can-Am sportscar series. The 2J had two fans at the rear of the car driven by a dedicated two-stroke engine to draw large amounts of air from under the chassis, reducing pressure and creating downforce. It had suffered from reliability problems with the second engine before being banned by the sporting authorities.

The contemporary Tyrrell 008 designed by Maurice Philippe had been built with a small fan fitted at the rear and driven from the engine's crankshaft. Ostensibly to act as an extractor fan for the radiators, which were mounted underneath the car, the fan had the side effect of its operation providing a modicum of downforce. However, in testing, the system was found to not be particularly effective. The car overheated, partly as a result of the size of the fan which was limited by the amount of space available. The fan concept was abandoned in favour of conventionally mounted radiators. Nevertheless, Cox, who was present at the tests and saw potential in the idea if properly developed, informed Murray of what Tyrrell had attempted.

Cox produced the overall layout for the car, utilising the cooling properties of the fan to be able to argue that this was its primary purpose, thus satisfying the regulations. Gordon Murray designed a version driven by a complex series of clutches running from the engine to a large single fan at the back of the car, anticipating problems caused by the momentum of the fan during gear changes, although in practice these were not required. Therefore, the faster the engine ran, the stronger the suction effect. Like the Lotus, it had sliding "skirts" that sealed the gap between the sides of the cars and the ground. These prevented excessive air from being sucked into the low pressure area under the car and dissipating the ground effect. There was a rule banning "moveable aerodynamic devices", but the fan also drew air through a horizontally mounted radiator over the engine. Using a fan to assist cooling was legal—Brabham had used a small electric fan to this effect on the BT45Cs at the South American races at the start of the year—and Brabham claimed that this was the primary effect of the new device. These claims were lent some legitimacy by the cooling system issues that had affected the original design at the start of the year.

The cars were modified BT46s—chassis numbers BT46/4 and BT46/6. Modifications to implement the fan concept were quite extensive—involving sealing the engine bay as well as adding the clutch system and the fan. They were designed and tested in some secrecy. Brabham's lead driver, Niki Lauda, realised he had to adjust his driving style, mostly for cornering. He found that if he accelerated around corners, the car would "stick" to the road as if it were on rails. This had the side effect of exposing the driver to very high lateral acceleration, which would become a major problem in the ground effect era. In his autobiography, Lauda described the car as being unpleasant to drive due to the lateral loads and reliance on aerodynamics over driver skill. He realised early on that the rate of ground effect development meant that in the future, every driver would be exposed to such g-loading while behind the wheel of such a car, and the physical effort needed to drive the cars would leave the drivers exhausted by the end of the races.

=== Racing history and aftermath ===
The two modified cars were prepared for the Swedish Grand Prix at Anderstorp on 17 June 1978, for Niki Lauda and John Watson. When not in use, the fan was covered by a dustbin lid, but it soon became clear what the modified Brabham was intended to achieve: when the drivers blipped the throttle, the car could be seen to squat down on its suspension as the downforce increased. Lotus driver Mario Andretti said: "It is like a bloody great vacuum cleaner. It throws muck and rubbish at you at a hell of a rate." Murray says that this was untrue, arguing: "The fan couldn't spit anything out the back because the fan efflux [exit speed] was only 55 mph. Besides the radial fan would have sent any stones flying sideways." The legality of the cars was soon protested, but they were allowed to race. They qualified second and third behind championship leader Andretti. In the race, Watson spun off on the 19th lap. Once the slower Didier Pironi dropped oil onto the track and with both major front-runners out of the race, the remaining Brabham was in a class of its own, seemingly unaffected by the slippery surface. Lauda passed Andretti around the outside of one of the corners, who dropped out shortly afterwards due to a broken valve, and went on to win by over half a minute from Riccardo Patrese in an Arrows.

There was uproar from rival teams, who saw the "fan car" as a threat to their competitiveness. Lotus immediately started design work on a fan version of the 79. Bernie Ecclestone, owner of the Brabham team, had also been secretary of the Formula One Constructors Association (FOCA) since 1972 and became its president during 1978. According to Ecclestone's biographer Terry Lovell, the heads of the other FOCA teams, led by Colin Chapman threatened to withdraw their support for Ecclestone unless he withdrew the BT46B. Ecclestone negotiated a deal within FOCA whereby the car would have continued for another three races before Brabham would voluntarily withdraw it. However, the Commission Sportive Internationale intervened to declare that henceforth fan cars would not be allowed and the car never raced again in Formula One. The car was not considered to have been illegal when it raced however, so the Swedish Grand Prix win stood. The two converted chassis were returned to standard BT46 configuration for the next race.

A BT46 competed in 'B' specification once again in 1979 in the Gunnar Nilsson Trophy race at Donington Park. This was an event held to raise funds for the Gunnar Nilsson Cancer Fund. Originally intended as a non-championship Formula One race, without FIA sanction it was instead run in a time trial format, with victory going to the fastest single lap recorded. As it was not an FIA event, the car's illegality was not a factor. Nelson Piquet drove, coming fourth of the five cars competing.

=== BT47 ===
Murray had designed a car for the 1979 season called the BT47 that had a Chaparral 2J-type box rear end with twin variable geometry fans on the rear to maximize ground effect. The car was never built due to the FIA closing the loophole in the regulations for the 1979 season.

== BT46C ==
=== Concept ===
Another variation on the theme was produced later in the season. Like the BT46B, the BT46C removed the radiators from the front wing assembly leaving a clean aerodynamic wing and moving the centre of gravity further back again. The standard radiators were replaced by units from a Volkswagen Golf mounted behind the front wheels out of the airstream in a region of positive pressure.

=== Racing history ===
The BT46C only ran in practice for the 1978 Austrian Grand Prix. The drivers complained of reduced revs and straight-line speed. It was not used in the race and did not appear again.

== Formula One results ==
(key) (results in bold indicate pole position; results in italics indicate fastest lap)

Year	Entrant	Engine	Tyres	Drivers	1	2	3	4	5	6	7	8	9	10	11	12	13	14	15	16	Points	WCC
1978	Parmalat Racing Brabham	Alfa Romeo F12	G		ARG	BRA	RSA	USW	MON	BEL	ESP	SWE	FRA	GBR	GER	AUT	NED	ITA	USA	CAN	53	**3rd** ^{1}
1978	Parmalat Racing Brabham	Alfa Romeo F12	G	Niki Lauda			**Ret**	Ret	2	Ret	Ret	1	Ret	2	Ret	Ret	3	1	Ret	Ret	53	**3rd** ^{1}
1978	Parmalat Racing Brabham	Alfa Romeo F12	G	John Watson			3	Ret	4	Ret	5	Ret	**4**	3	7	7	4	2	Ret	Ret	53	**3rd** ^{1}
1978	Parmalat Racing Brabham	Alfa Romeo F12	G	Nelson Piquet																11	53	**3rd** ^{1}
1979	Parmalat Racing Brabham	Alfa Romeo F12	G		ARG	BRA	RSA	USW	ESP	BEL	MON	FRA	GBR	GER	AUT	NED	ITA	CAN	USA		7	**8th** ^{2}
1979	Parmalat Racing Brabham	Alfa Romeo F12	G	Niki Lauda	PO																7	**8th** ^{2}
1979	Parmalat Racing Brabham	Alfa Romeo F12	G	Nelson Piquet	Ret																7	**8th** ^{2}

^1 This total includes points scored by the BT45C car Brabham used during the first two races.
^2 This total includes points scored by the BT48 & BT49 cars Brabham used for the rest of the season.

== See also ==
- Chaparral 2J — an earlier example of a race car that used a fan for downforce
- Lotus 88
