= Lotus 80 =

Formula One racing car

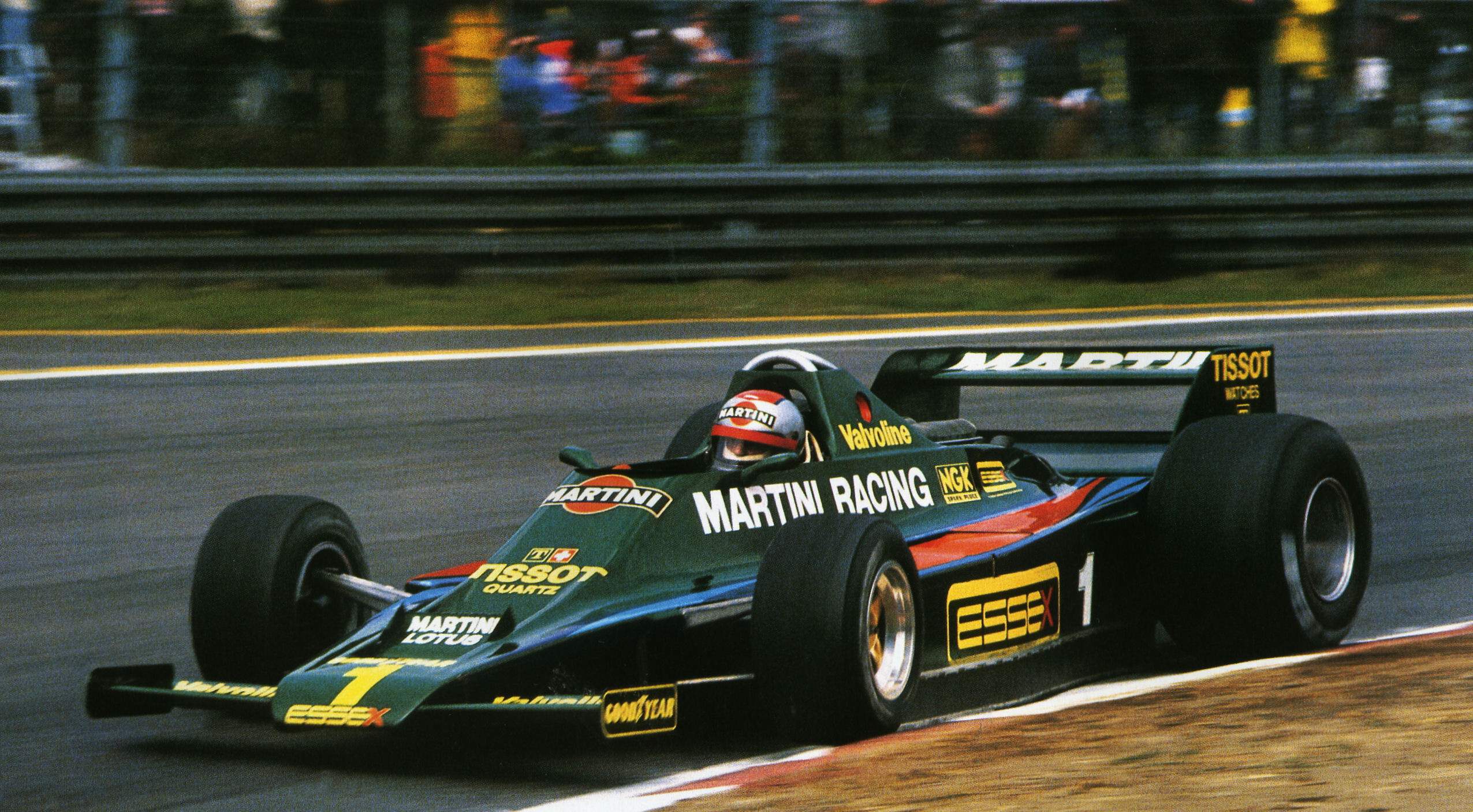
- Mario Andretti driving the 80 in 1979
- Category: Formula One
- Constructor: Team Lotus
- Designers: Colin Chapman (Technical Director); Martin Ogilvie (Chief Designer); Peter Wright (Head of Aerodynamics); Geoff Aldridge (Chief Engineer)
- Predecessor: Lotus 79
- Successor: Lotus 81

Technical specifications
- Chassis: Aluminium monocoque
- Suspension (front): Lower wishbone and upper rocker-arms, with inboard coilover spring / damper units
- Suspension (rear): Lower wishbone and upper rocker-arms, with inboard coilover spring / damper units
- Axle track: Front: 70 in (1,778 mm); Rear: 64 in (1,626 mm)
- Wheelbase: 108 in (2,743 mm)
- Engine: Ford-Cosworth DFV 2,993 cc (182.6 cu in) 90° V8 NA, mid-engine, longitudinally mounted
- Transmission: Lotus / Hewland FGA400 5-speed
- Weight: 625 kg (1,378 lb)
- Fuel: Essex
- Tyres: Goodyear

Competition history
- Notable entrants: Martini Racing Team Lotus
- Notable drivers: 1. (United States) Mario Andretti
- Debut: 1979 Spanish Grand Prix
- Last event: 1979 French Grand Prix
Races	Wins	Podiums	Poles	F/Laps
3	0	1	0	0
- Constructors' Championships: 0
- Drivers' Championships: 0
- Unless otherwise stated, all data refer to Formula One World Championship Grands Prix only.

The Lotus 80 was a Formula One car used by Team Lotus in 1979. The car, designed by Colin Chapman, Martin Ogilvie, Peter Wright and Tony Rudd, was an attempt to take ground effect as far as possible.

== Design ==
Ogilvie and Rudd reasoned that to take a further step ahead of the competition, the new car should be designed as one huge ground effect system, starting just behind the nose and extending all the way to the back of the car beyond the rear wheels. An additional ground effect system was built into the nose, in an effort to turn the whole chassis into an aerodynamic device. In theory this would create a tremendous amount of downforce, so the chassis would have to be built to be more structurally rigid than that of the Lotus 79. The 80 also would not need wings due to the massive downforce. Chapman approved the idea at once.

The car appeared resplendent in British racing green, since John Player Special had pulled out of F1. The car featured 'Coke bottle' sidepods, something that would become familiar in the 1980s. However, a serious problem was encountered during testing. Mario Andretti reported that at speed the car behaved very well, but in braking and cornering, where speeds were lower, the car lost downforce alarmingly then regained it unexpectedly. The problem was twofold: firstly, the ground effect's low pressure area under the car was moving around with the car's centre of gravity. The phenomenon was known as porpoising, as the car appeared to be lifting and squatting at different speeds, causing it to lurch violently through corners. Secondly, the slightest difference in track ride height including off cambered corners, kerbs, etc. affected the undercar pressure hugely. The team experimented by fitting the car with wings, but this had little effect on the way the car behaved. Andretti persevered with the car, but his new teammate Carlos Reutemann refused to drive it after he tested the car and stayed with the Lotus 79.

== Competition history ==
Chapman eventually had to admit the 80 was not the wondercar he had planned, and after a reasonable third place for Andretti in the 1979 Spanish Grand Prix, Andretti qualified the car fifth for the Belgian Grand Prix but raced the Lotus 79 due to problems with the Lotus 80. The problems with the Lotus 80 became obvious in the Monaco Grand Prix and the French Grand Prix with Andretti retiring from both races. The Lotus 79 was modified and pressed back into service.

It was a massive setback for the team, and for the car which had appeared so promising. However, Chapman persevered with the concept of a full-length ground effect chassis in the Lotus 88.

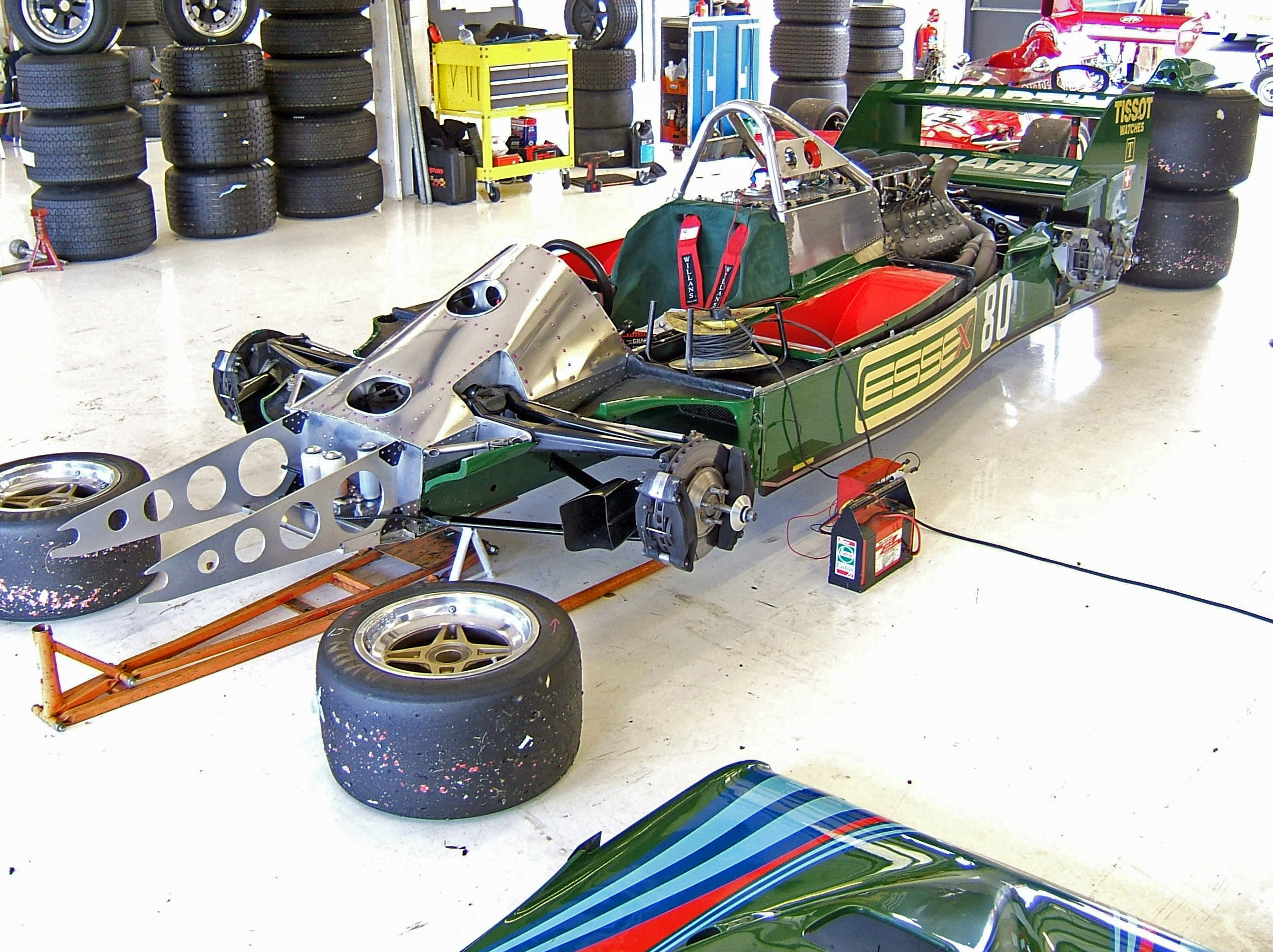
Lotus 80

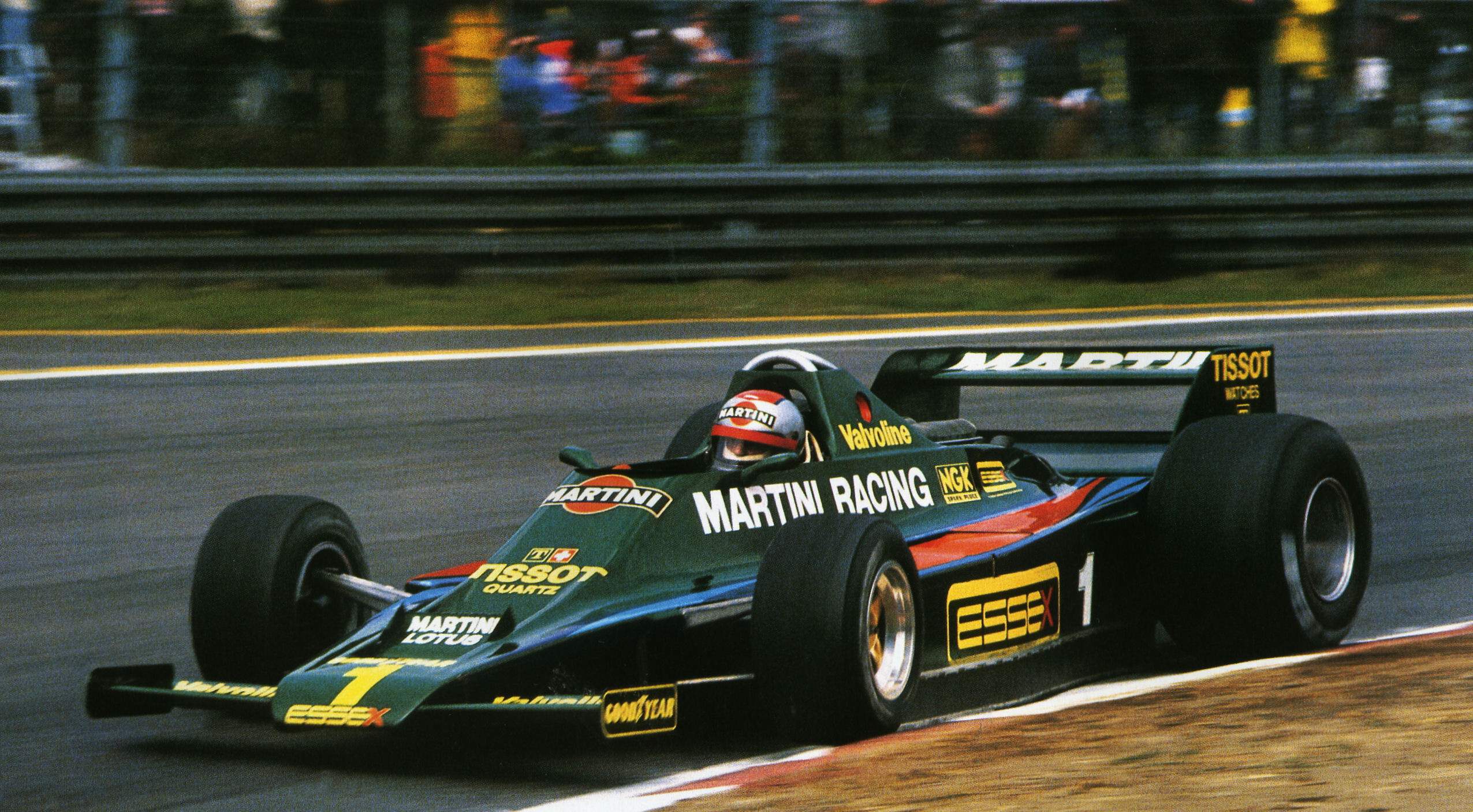
Mario Andretti driving the 80 during practice for the 1979 Belgian Grand Prix

== Complete Formula One results ==
(key)

Year	Entrant	Engine	Tyres	Drivers	1	2	3	4	5	6	7	8	9	10	11	12	13	14	15	Points	WCC
1979	Martini Racing Team Lotus	Ford Cosworth DFV	G		ARG	BRA	RSA	USW	ESP	BEL	MON	FRA	GBR	GER	AUT	NED	ITA	CAN	USA	39^{1}	4th
1979	Martini Racing Team Lotus	Ford Cosworth DFV	G	Mario Andretti					3	PO	Ret	Ret								39^{1}	4th

^1 Includes 35 points that were scored with the Lotus 79.
