= Lotus 79 =

Formula One racing car

Lotus 79 (John Player Special Mk. IV)
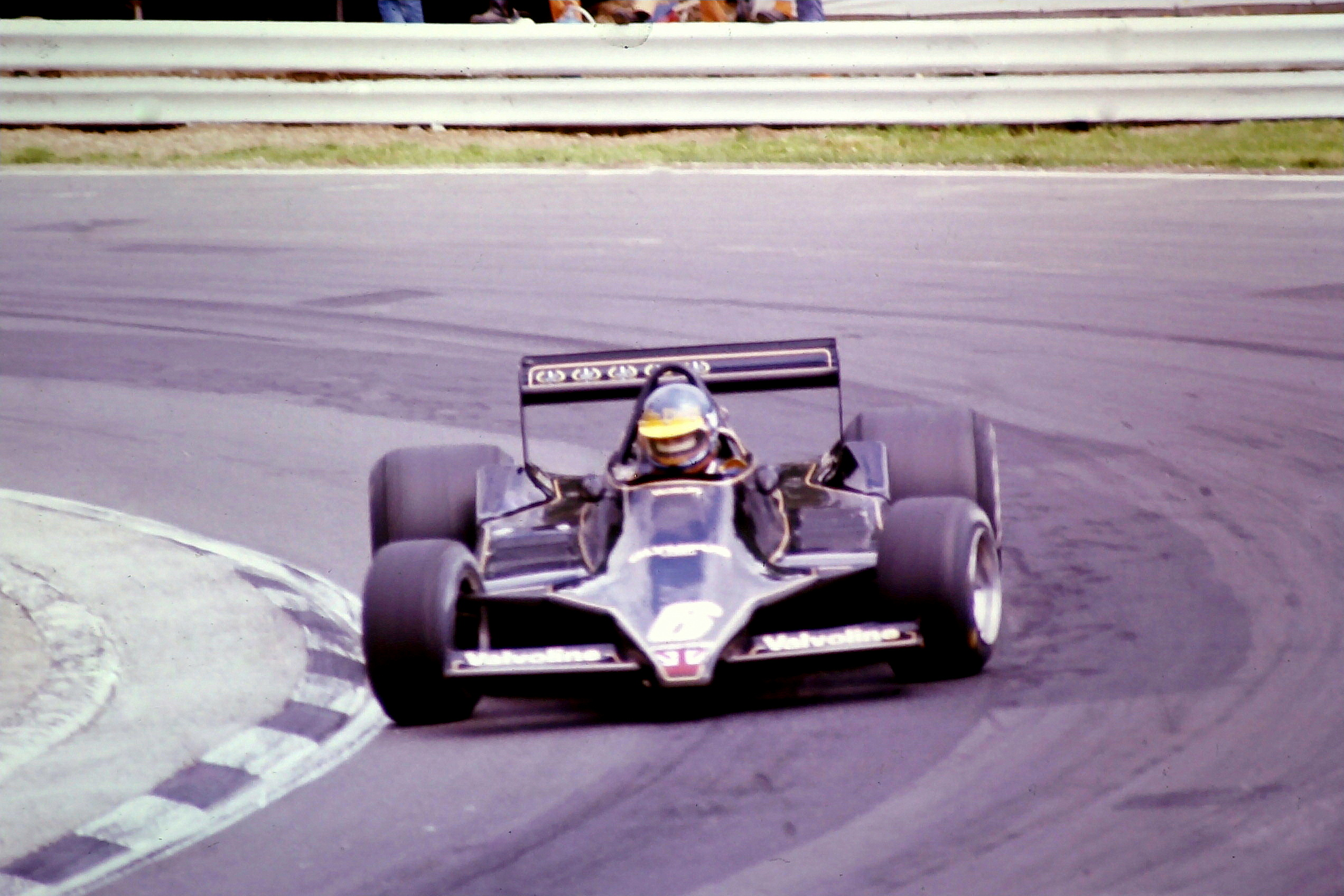
- Ronnie Peterson driving the 79 at Brands Hatch during the 1978 British Grand Prix
- Category: Formula One
- Constructor: Team Lotus
- Designers: Colin Chapman (Executive Engineer); Tony Rudd (Head of Engineering); Tony Southgate (Chief Engineer); Peter Wright (Aerodynamics); Martin Ogilvie (Vehicle Engineer); Geoff Aldridge (Chief Designer)
- Predecessor: Lotus 78
- Successor: Lotus 80

Technical specifications
- Chassis: Aluminium monocoque
- Suspension (front): Double wishbone, inboard spring/damper.
- Suspension (rear): Parallel top links, lower wishbones, twin radius arms, outboard spring/damper.
- Engine: Ford-Cosworth DFV, 2993cc V8, naturally aspirated, mid-engined, longitudinally-mounted
- Transmission: Hewland FG 400, 5-speed manual
- Power: 475 hp min, up to 495 hp @ 11,000 rpm
- Fuel: 1978: Valvoline; 1979: Essex
- Tyres: Goodyear

Competition history
- Notable entrants: John Player Team Lotus (1978); Martini Racing Team Lotus (1979); Team Rebaque
- Notable drivers: 5./1. (United States) Mario Andretti; 6. (Sweden) Ronnie Peterson; 55. (France) Jean-Pierre Jarier; 2. (Argentina) Carlos Reutemann; 31. (Mexico) Héctor Rebaque
- Debut: 1978 Belgian Grand Prix
- First win: 1978 Belgian Grand Prix
- Last win: 1978 Dutch Grand Prix
- Last event: 1979 United States Grand Prix
Races	Wins	Podiums	Poles	F/Laps
26	6	15	10	5
- Constructors' Championships: 1 (1978)
- Drivers' Championships: 1 (Mario Andretti, 1978)

The Lotus 79 is a Formula One car designed in late 1977 by Colin Chapman, Geoff Aldridge, Martin Ogilvie, Tony Rudd, Tony Southgate and Peter Wright of Lotus. The Lotus 79 was the first F1 car to take full advantage of ground effect aerodynamics.

Over the span of its lifetime, the Lotus 79 took 7 wins, 10 pole positions, 121 points and won the last drivers' and constructors' world championships for Lotus. The 79 is credited with pushing Formula One into the modern aerodynamics era. After Rubens Barrichello drove the 79 at the Goodwood Festival of Speed in 2000, he spoke of its "phenomenal grip and traction", and stated that "it felt like a modern Grand Prix car".

== Development ==
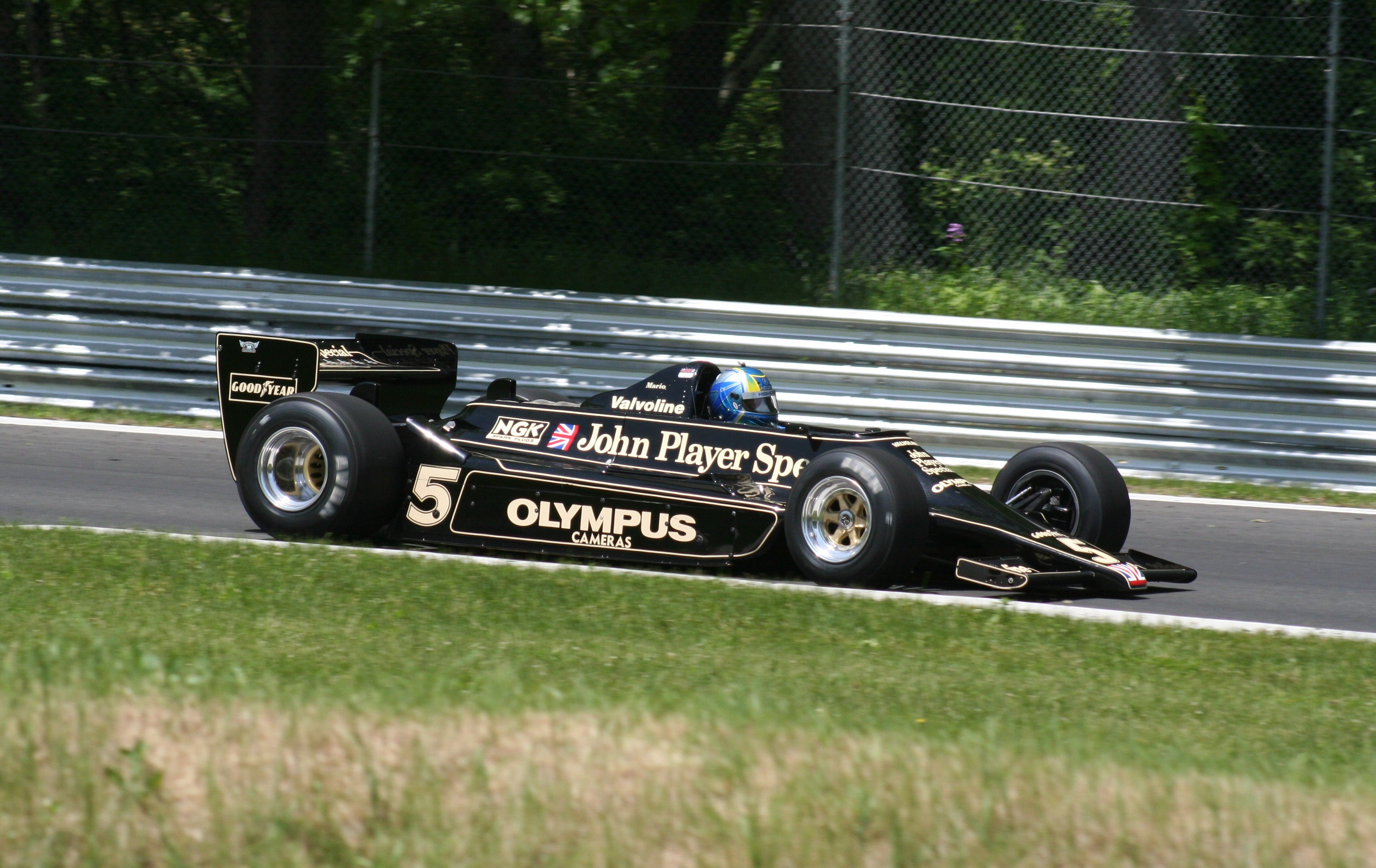
Lotus 79 at Lime Rock

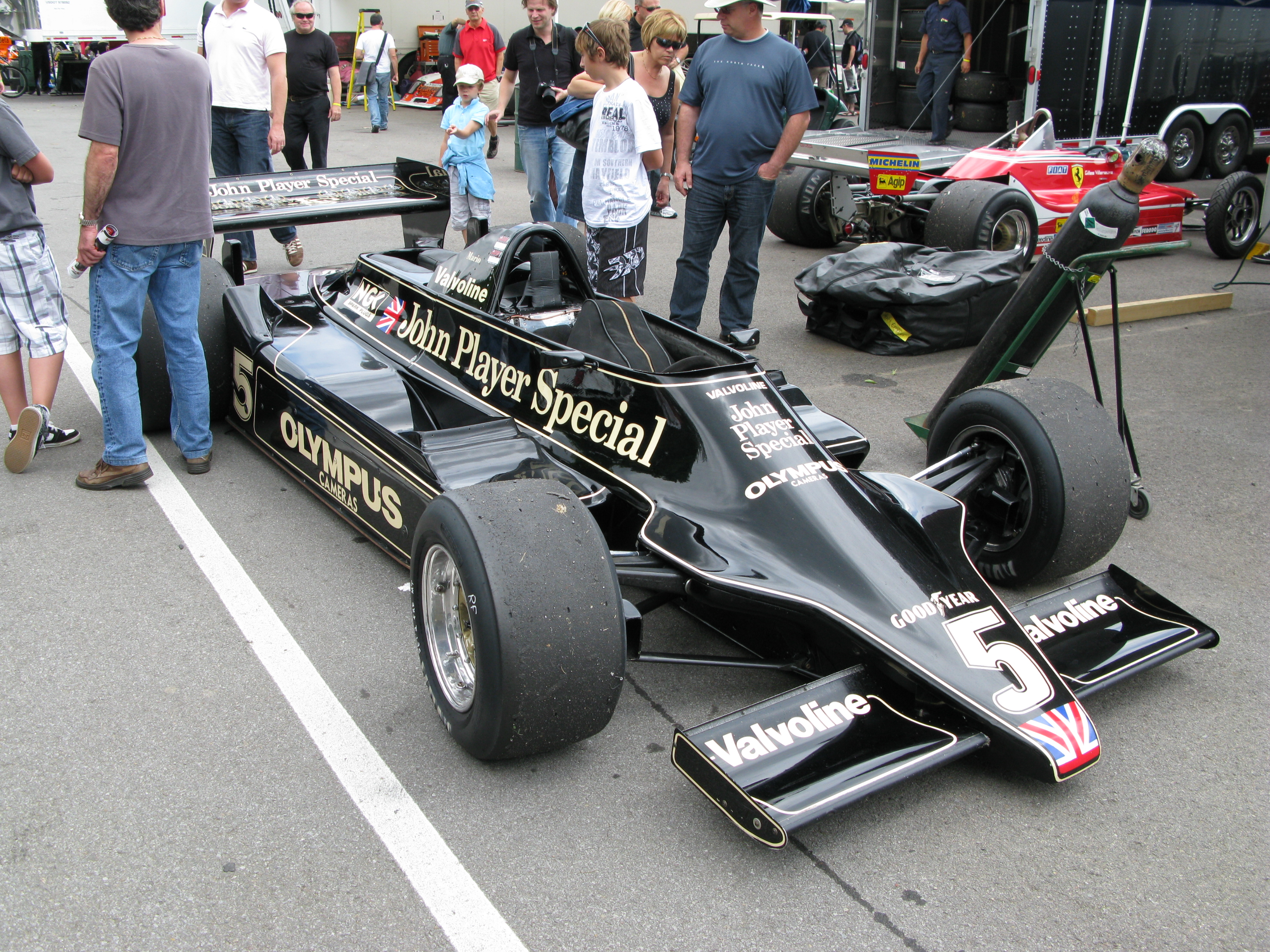
Lotus 79

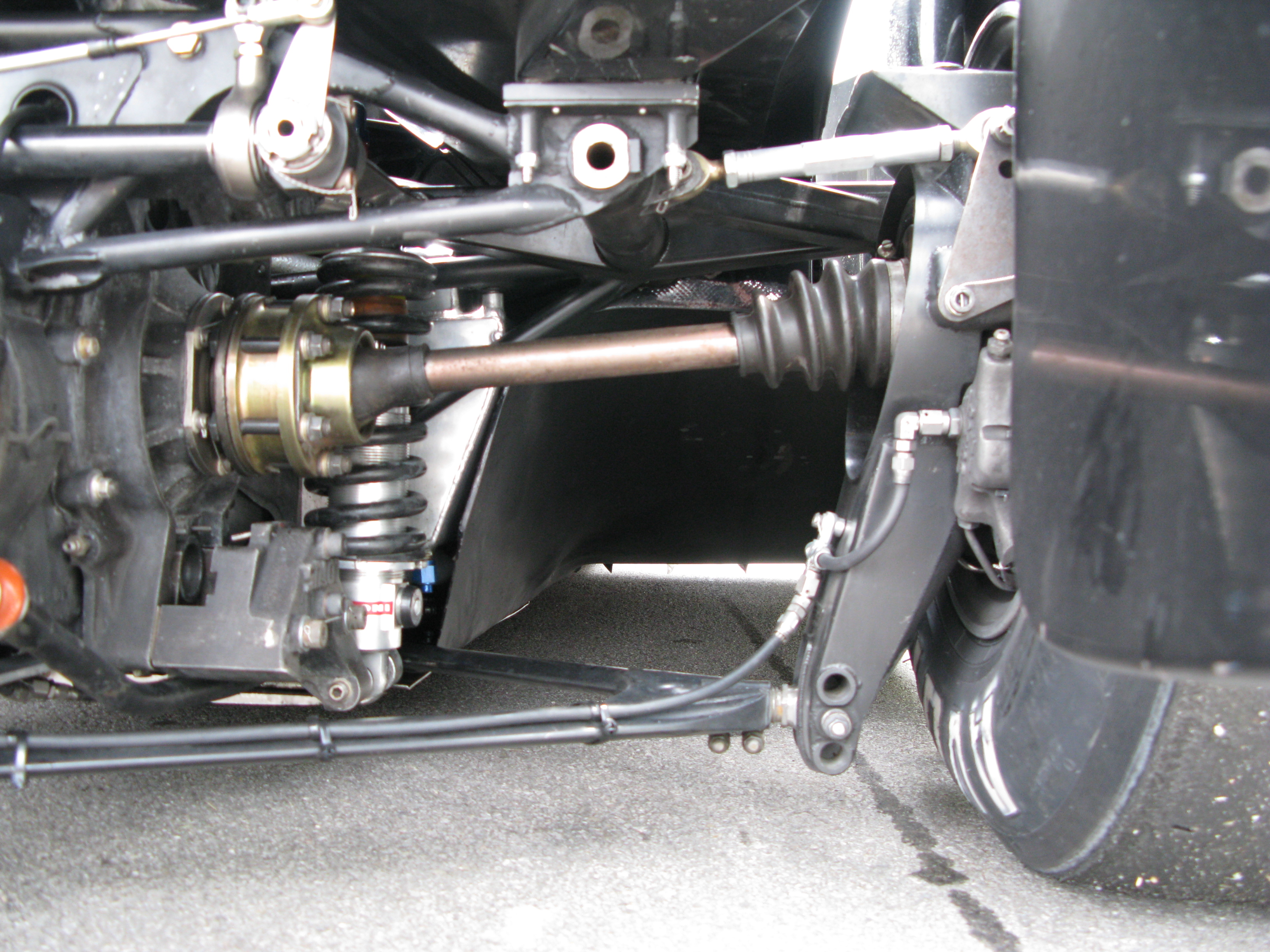
A view from the rear, looking up the right-hand side venturi tunnel of the Lotus 79

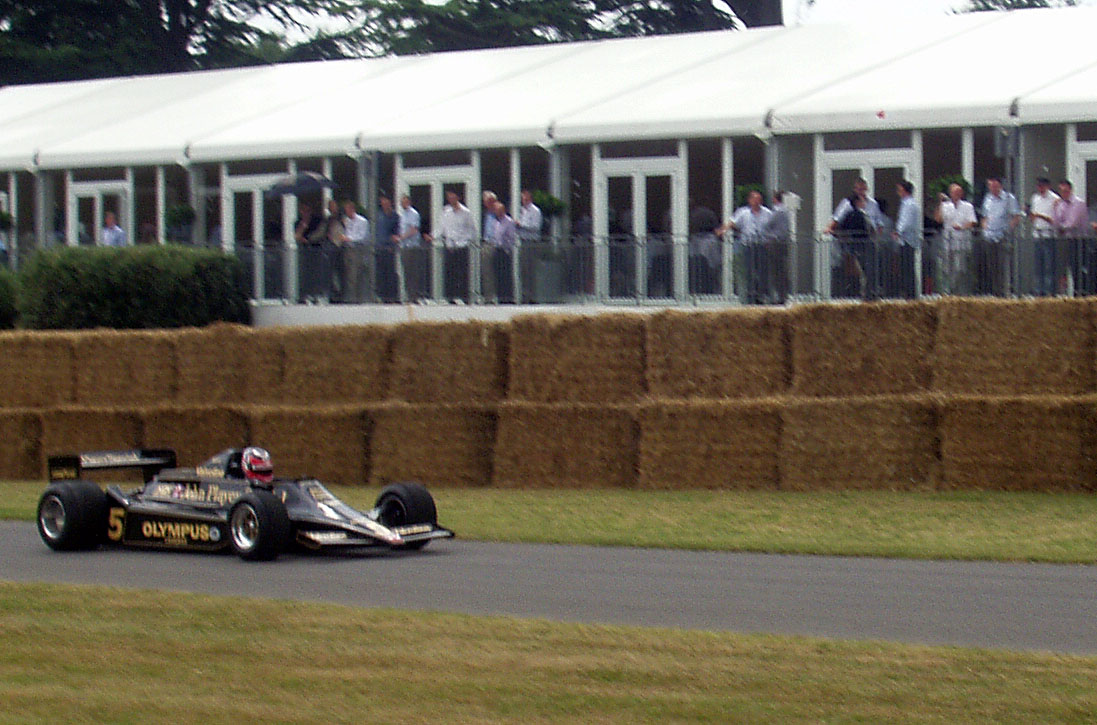
Lotus 79 at the 2006 Goodwood Festival of Speed

The Lotus 79's ground effect aerodynamics were pioneered in its immediate predecessor, the Lotus 78. The undercar pressure problems in the 78 were resolved with the 79, with further design work on the venturi tunnels under the car, which allowed the low pressure area to be evenly spaced along the whole of the underside. This was achieved by extending the rear bodywork to a point inside the rear wheel suspension system, allowing the underside to extend further back, instead of ending abruptly in front of the rear wheels as on the 78. As a result, the rear suspension was also redesigned to allow the air to exit the rear more cleanly than on its predecessor. This allowed a smaller rear wing to be used, lowering drag. When the car first appeared, the upper bodywork was steeply raked and featured "Coke bottle" sidepods. After work in the wind tunnel, these features were found to be unnecessary, as the car generated so much downforce anyway. These features were, however, later incorporated into the Lotus 80. In all, five chassis were built during the design's lifetime, with the prototype 79/1 later sold to Héctor Rebaque to race as a privateer entrant.

The car was powered by the Ford Cosworth DFV and constructed of sheet aluminium honeycomb, specially strengthened for the pressures exerted on the car by the ground effect. The fuel tank was one single cell behind the driver, as opposed to the separate fuel tanks on the previous Lotus 78. This had the advantage of increasing fire protection and returning the centre of gravity to the middle of the car, helping cornering and braking. The 79 was also the first F1 car to be designed using computer design aids. In fact, it was the first F1 car to use computers to analyse it in the pits on race weekends.

The car was secretly tested in late 1977 by Ronnie Peterson and proved extremely fast, but the chassis suffered early fatigue due to the severe suction and g-forces generated by the ground effect. The 79 produced about 30% more downforce than the 78, something not foreseen by Ogilvie and Rudd, who went back to the drawing board. The chassis was strengthened in specific points, mostly around the monocoque and load bearing points on the chassis tub, and the car was found to be even faster than before.

The need for smooth airflow dictated the car must have clean lines. Nicknamed "Black Beauty" by the press and F1 fans alike, for its graceful design and sleek profile and its black and gold livery through sponsorship by John Player Special cigarettes, the Lotus 79 was instantly competitive on its debut, the 1978 Belgian Grand Prix at Zolder. It took the pole position at the hands of Mario Andretti by more than a second, and went on to win the race comfortably. Andretti said after driving the 79 for the first time that, in comparison, the Lotus 78 was "like driving a London bus". Peterson once quipped, after scoring an impressive pole position, that the car was so brilliantly set up, all he had to do was steer.

The 79 was not without its problems, however. Wright and Ogilvie noted that the car was very marginal in some aspects of its design. Andretti had reservations over the car's brakes, which faded noticeably over a race distance, especially in hot conditions; the exhaust had a tendency to overheat, and the monocoque tub was not as stiff as the team would have liked, which meant a new casting had to be fabricated several times during the two seasons the car was used.

== Racing history ==
=== 1978 ===
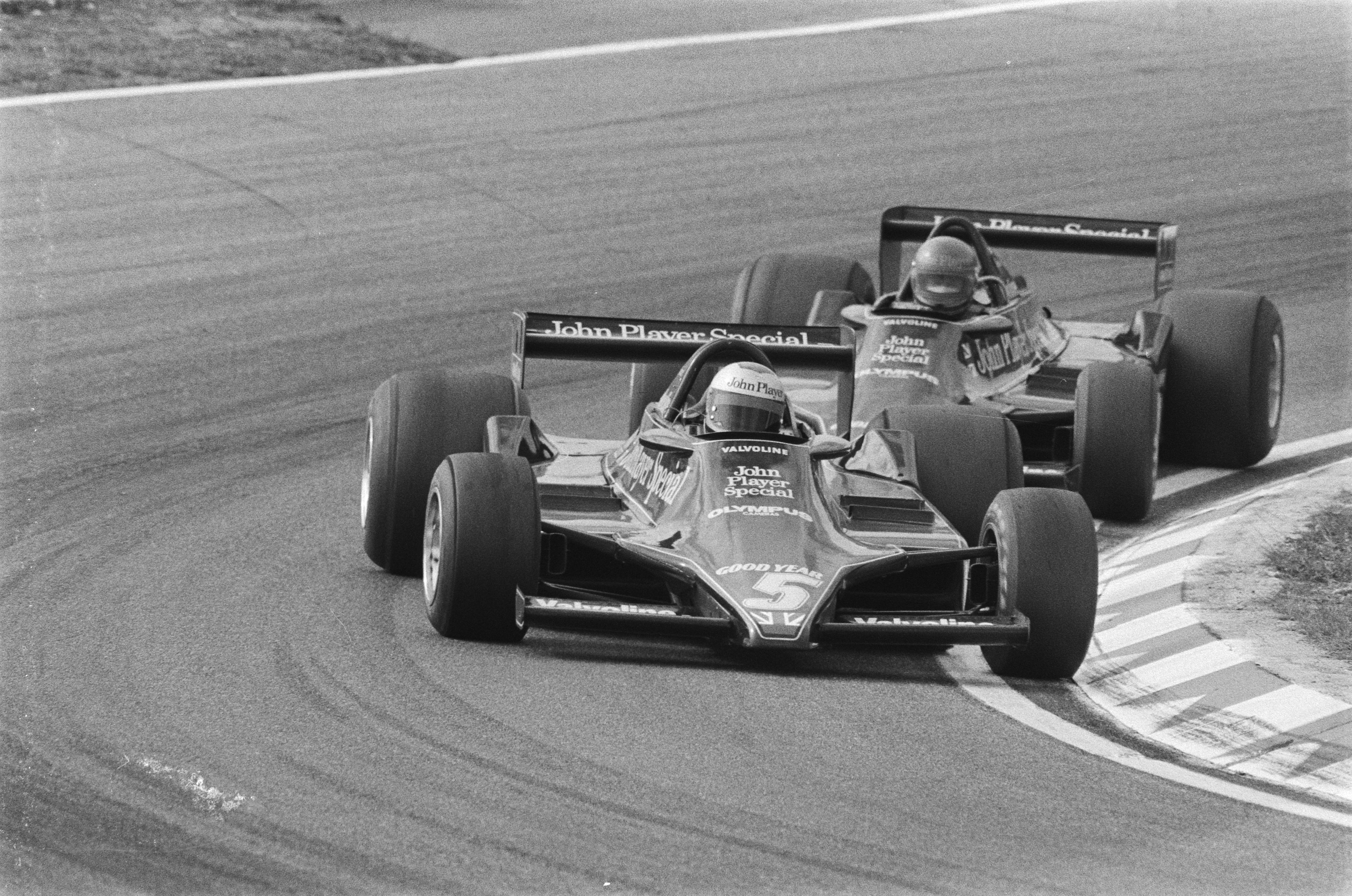
Mario Andretti and Ronnie Peterson driving their Lotus 79s at the 1978 Dutch Grand Prix.

The 79 proved to be almost unbeatable during the 1978 Formula One season and provided an unprecedented level of domination; the team had already won in Argentina with Andretti and South Africa with Peterson. The 79 was first used during practice for the Monaco Grand Prix with Mario Andretti driving but he used the 78 in the race. The 79 was ready for the following round in Belgium with one car available for Andretti with Peterson using the older 78, the pair played a one-two with Andretti and Peterson. Same results in the same order at the Spanish Grand Prix as both drivers had exclusive use of the 79. The Swedish Grand Prix caused anger from several teams including Lotus because Brabham had redesigned their Brabham BT46B which was known as the "fan car". Andretti took pole and led till Niki Lauda's fan car passed him, Andretti would have his engine blow up and Peterson finish third behind Lauda and Riccardo Patrese's Arrows. After the race, Brabham voluntarily withdrew the BT46B. The 79 was first and second at France with Andretti first and Peterson second. The 79 had a double retirement at the home in the British Grand Prix with Peterson retired from second place after seven laps with a fuel leak, Andretti led until lap twenty four when he pitted with a left rear puncture and whilst chasing the leading pack he blew his engine up. In Germany Andretti won but Peterson retired when his gearbox failed, the Austrian Grand Prix saw Peterson win (being the last win of an Swedish driver until this moment) but Andretti retired after he tried to pass Carlos Reutemann's Ferrari and the two touched with Andretti car spinning into the barriers. Holland was the last first and second for Lotus in its career with Andretti first and Peterson second. At the Italian Grand Prix, Andretti qualified on pole but Peterson qualified sixth and had to use the older 78 after the 79 had sudden brake failure in the warm-up plus he was unable to fit into Andretti's spare car. The start was chaotic with Andretti being passed by Gilles Villeneuve's Ferrari and Lauda's Brabham. Peterson had a poor start plus bunching around him caused a collision between him, Patrese's Arrows and James Hunt's McLaren. Peterson's car caught fire and Hunt dragged him free and laid him in the middle of the track fully conscious, but with severe leg injuries. Peterson had an operation and would die on the Monday after the race. Andretti would take the restart and would be first on the road but finished sixth after he and Villeneuve both jumped the restarted race. Jean-Pierre Jarier took over the second Lotus in the United States and was running third, till he ran out of fuel with four laps to go, Andretti led for the opening laps but had a brake issue and later on his engine blew. The Canadian Grand Prix had problems for Andretti as he attempted to pass John Watson's Brabham and the two made contact, dropping Andretti almost to the back of the field and finished tenth. Jarier took pole and led until an oil leak.

The Lotus 79 was so dominant the only real threat was the Ferrari 312T3, and the advantage its Michelin tyres gave in hot weather conditions. Its other threat was the Brabham BT46B "fan car", but Brabham withdrew it after its victory in Sweden. Meanwhile, the Ferraris only won when the Lotus failed to finish. Most races became a scrap for minor placings, as Andretti and Peterson regularly finished first and second, often by a considerable margin ahead of the rest. On the rare occasion the 79 did not win or fail, one or both drivers were usually on the podium. Andretti was comfortably world champion in 1978 and Peterson finished runner-up posthumously; Lotus won the constructors’ championship with 86 points.

=== 1979 ===
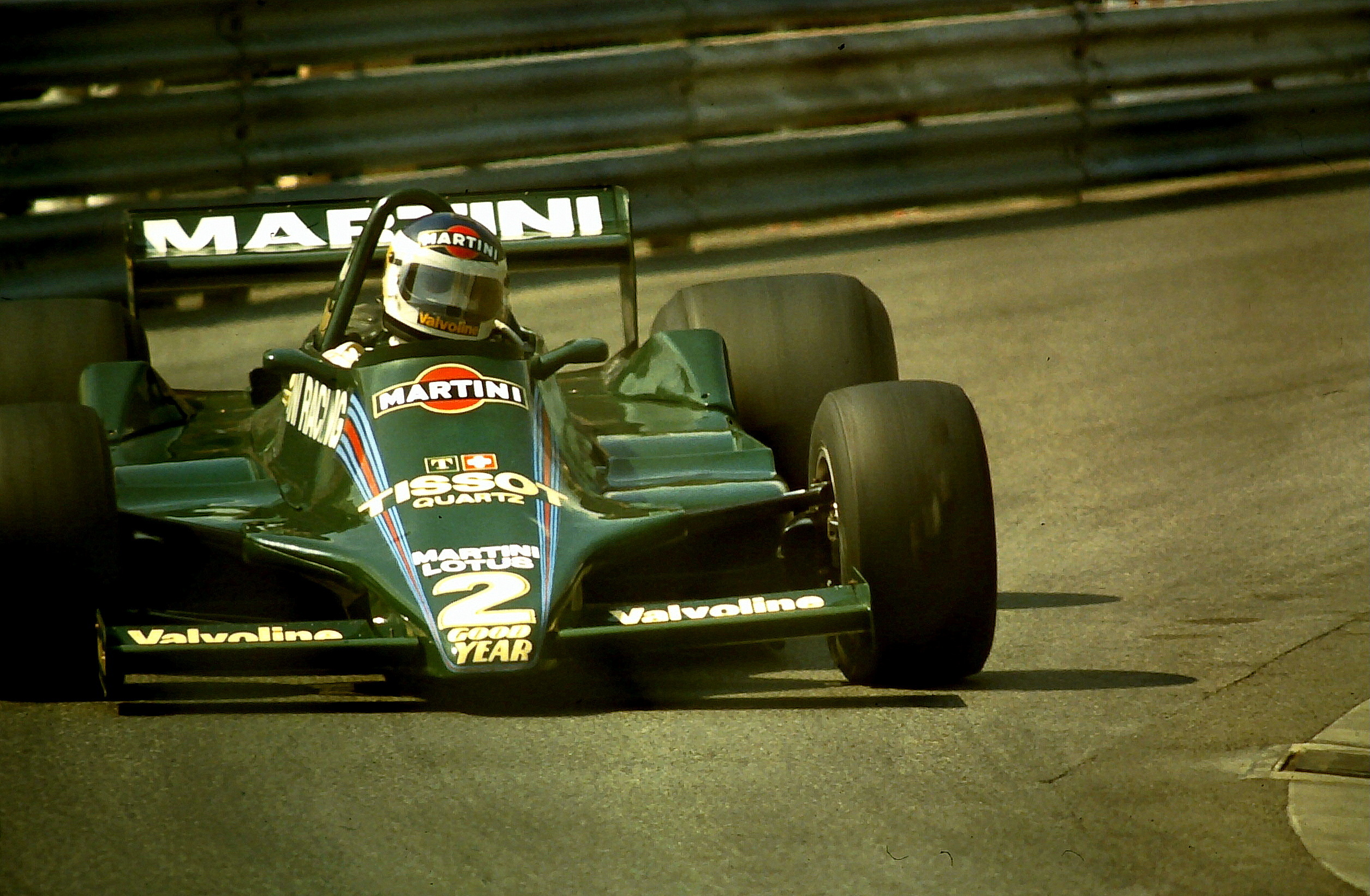
Carlos Reutemann driving the Martini Racing-liveried 79 at the 1979 Monaco Grand Prix

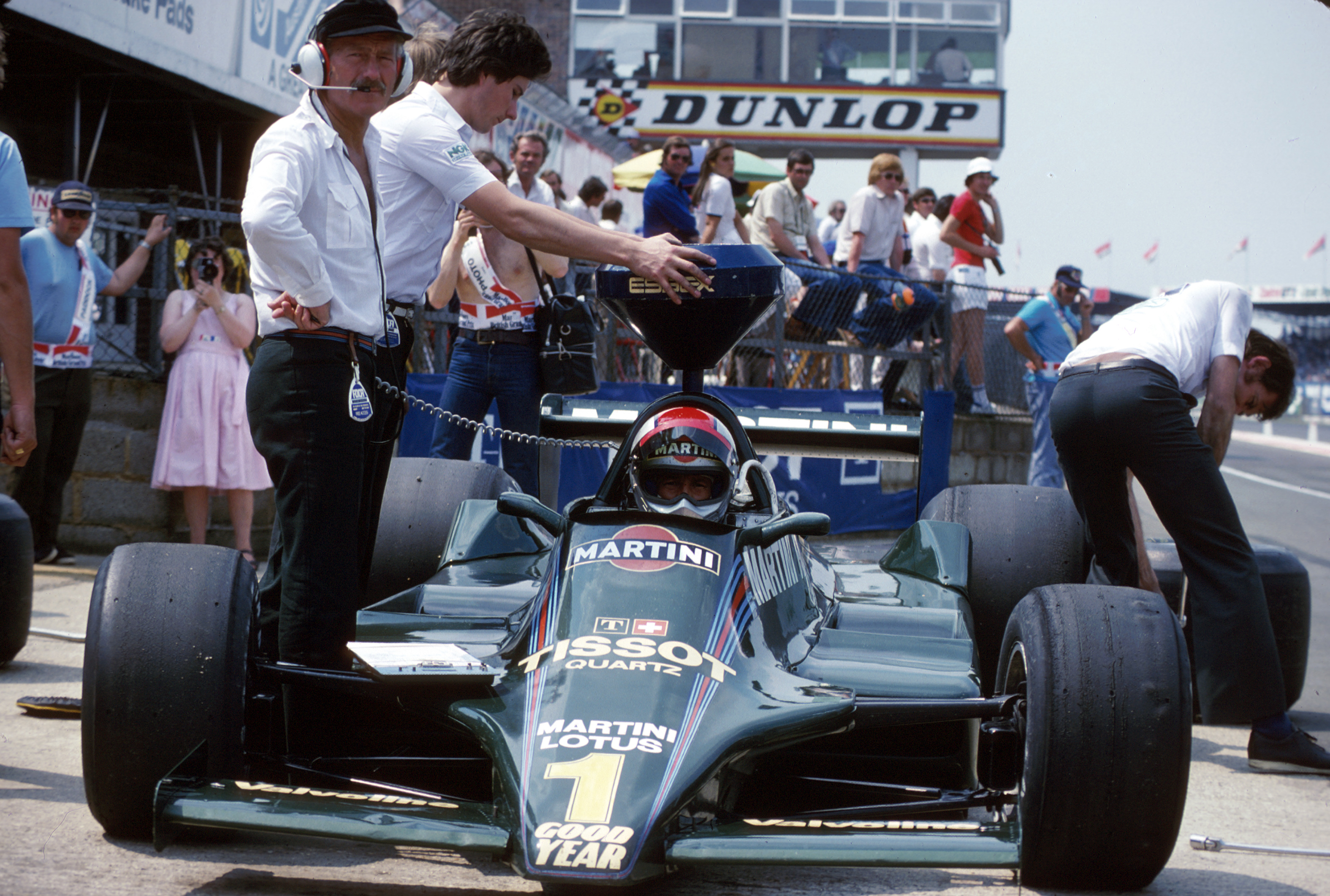
Mario Andretti in the 79 chatting via radio to Team Lotus boss Colin Chapman

In 1979, Lotus kept Andretti but recruited Carlos Reutemann as their second driver, Martini Racing replaced JPS as sponsor in that year, so the car appeared in British racing green after twelve years. The 79 was to be replaced by the Lotus 80, intended to be the next step in the evolution of ground effects. Unlike the two previous models, although, the 80 proved to be a total failure and Lotus was forced to go back to the 79, driven by Andretti and Carlos Reutemann. Several podium places were scored and the 79 was in contention for victory in the early stage of the season, but the next generation of ground effects cars led first by the Ligier JS11, then the Ferrari 312T4 and then the Williams FW07 — a car heavily based on the 79 outclassed the Lotus. Although the car was updated with revised bodywork and a new rear wing, Lotus slipped to fourth in the constructors' championship and the car was retired at the end of the 1979 season, without winning any further races, signalling the end of the team's glorious era. The 79 did however provide Nigel Mansell with his first Formula One test in December 1979 at Paul Ricard.

Lotus 79 at Goodwood Festival of Speed 2010

== In popular culture ==
A playable version of the Lotus 79 can be found on the Formula One 05 PlayStation 2 game. The Lotus 79 is also available for the iRacing.com online, subscription-based racing simulation service for Microsoft Windows, Mac and Linux.

The car is also featured in the game F1 2018 by Codemasters, being one of the classic cars available to drive.

The car is featured as a tribute in the final episode of Top Gear Series 27.

== Formula One World Championship results ==
(key) (results in bold indicate pole position; results in italics indicate fastest lap)

Year	Entrant	Engine	Tyres	Drivers	1	2	3	4	5	6	7	8	9	10	11	12	13	14	15	16	Points	WCC
1978	John Player Team Lotus	Ford Cosworth DFV V8	G		ARG	BRA	RSA	USW	MON	BEL	ESP	SWE	FRA	GBR	GER	AUT	NED	ITA	USA	CAN	86^{1}	1st^{1}
1978	John Player Team Lotus	Ford Cosworth DFV V8	G	Mario Andretti					PO	**1**	**1**	**Ret**	1	Ret	**1**	Ret	**1**	**6**	**Ret**	10	86^{1}	1st^{1}
1978	John Player Team Lotus	Ford Cosworth DFV V8	G	Ronnie Peterson							2	3	2	**Ret**	Ret	**1**	2	PO			86^{1}	1st^{1}
1978	John Player Team Lotus	Ford Cosworth DFV V8	G	Jean-Pierre Jarier															15	**Ret**	86^{1}	1st^{1}
1979	Martini Racing Team Lotus	Ford Cosworth DFV V8	G		ARG	BRA	RSA	USW	ESP	BEL	MON	FRA	GBR	GER	AUT	NED	ITA	CAN	USA		39^{2}	4th^{2}
1979	Martini Racing Team Lotus	Ford Cosworth DFV V8	G	Mario Andretti	5	Ret	4	4		Ret			Ret	Ret	Ret	Ret	5	10	Ret		39^{2}	4th^{2}
1979	Martini Racing Team Lotus	Ford Cosworth DFV V8	G	Carlos Reutemann	2	3	5	Ret	2	4	3	13	8	Ret	Ret	Ret	7	Ret	Ret		39^{2}	4th^{2}
1979	Team Rebaque	Ford Cosworth DFV V8	G	Héctor Rebaque	Ret	DNQ	Ret	Ret	Ret	Ret		12	9	Ret	DNQ	7					39^{2}	4th^{2}

^1 This total includes points scored by the Lotus 78.
^2 This total includes points scored by the Lotus 80 used by Andretti in three races.

== Non-Championship results ==
Year	Entrants	Engine	Drivers	Tyres	1	2
1978	John Player Team Lotus	Ford Cosworth DFV V8		G	INT	
1978	John Player Team Lotus	Ford Cosworth DFV V8	Mario Andretti	G	Ret	
1978	John Player Team Lotus	Ford Cosworth DFV V8	Ronnie Peterson	G	PO	
1979	Martini Racing Team Lotus	Ford Cosworth DFV V8		G	ROC	DIN
1979	Martini Racing Team Lotus	Ford Cosworth DFV V8	Mario Andretti	G	3	
1979	Martini Racing Team Lotus	Ford Cosworth DFV V8	Carlos Reutemann	G		2

== Bibliography ==
- Tipler, John (2003). Lotus 78 and 79: The Ground Effect Cars. Crowood Press. p. 192. ISBN 978-1-86126-586-9.
- Cotton, Andrew (2016). Lotus 79: Ultimate Ground Effect F1 Car. Haynes Publishing. ISBN 978-0-85733-810-5.
