= 1978 French Grand Prix =

- Race 9 of 16 in the 1978 Formula One season
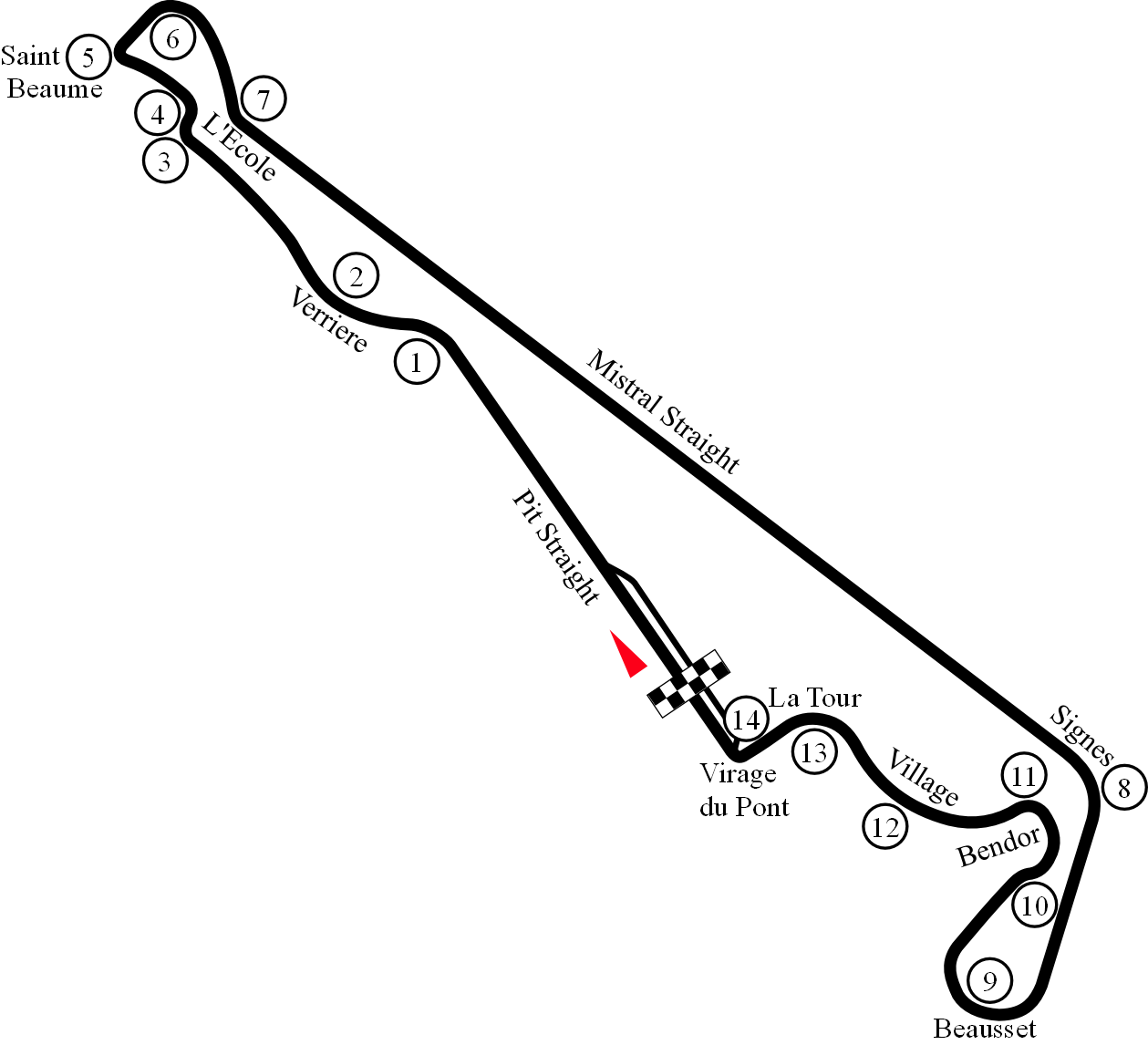

Race details
- Date: 2 July 1978
- Official name: 64e Grand Prix de France
- Location: Circuit Paul Ricard; Le Castellet, Var, France
- Course: Permanent racing facility
- Course length: 5.809 km (3.610 miles)
- Distance: 54 laps, 313.686 km (194.915 miles)
- Weather: Dry

Pole position
Driver	(United Kingdom) John Watson	Brabham-Alfa Romeo
- Time: 1:44.41

Fastest lap
Driver	(Argentina) Carlos Reutemann	Ferrari
- Time: 1:48.56 on lap 48

Podium
First	(United States) Mario Andretti	Lotus-Ford
Second	(Sweden) Ronnie Peterson	Lotus-Ford
Third	(United Kingdom) James Hunt	McLaren-Ford

The 1978 French Grand Prix was a Formula One motor race held at Paul Ricard on 2 July 1978. It was the ninth race of the 1978 World Championship of F1 Drivers and the 1978 International Cup for F1 Constructors. The 54-lap race was won by Mario Andretti, driving a Lotus-Ford, with teammate Ronnie Peterson second and James Hunt third in a McLaren-Ford. This would prove to be the final podium for Hunt.

== Report ==
Following the voluntary withdrawal of the "fan car", Brabham had to revert to their previous car again, but it did not deter them, with John Watson on pole and Niki Lauda starting third behind Mario Andretti's Lotus. At the start, Watson led into the first corner, with Andretti following, and Patrick Tambay putting his McLaren in third, but that order did not remain for long as Andretti took the lead from Watson on the first lap. Lauda and Ronnie Peterson were on the move as well, as they passed Watson and Tambay to jump into second and third, but Lauda suffered another engine failure. This left the two Lotus cars running 1–2 and they finished like that with Andretti taking his third win in four races, and the podium was completed by James Hunt who passed Watson mid-race.

== Classification ==
=== Qualifying ===
Pos.	No.	Driver	Constructor	Q1	Q2	Q3	Gap
1	2	(United Kingdom) John Watson	Brabham-Alfa Romeo	1:47.20	1:44.41	1:45.97	—
2	5	(United States) Mario Andretti	Lotus-Ford	1:47.50	1:44.46	1:45.02	+0.05
3	1	(Austria) Niki Lauda	Brabham-Alfa Romeo	1:45.52	1:45.02	1:44.71	+0.30
4	7	(United Kingdom) James Hunt	McLaren-Ford	1:46.20	1:45.32	1:44.92	+0.51
5	6	(Sweden) Ronnie Peterson	Lotus-Ford	1:46.46	1:45.10	1:44.98	+0.57
6	8	(France) Patrick Tambay	McLaren-Ford	1:47.06	1:45.07	1:46.15	+0.66
7	20	(South Africa) Jody Scheckter	Wolf-Ford	1:46.10	1:45.20	1:46.33	+0.79
8	11	(Argentina) Carlos Reutemann	Ferrari	1:46.50	1:45.35	1:45.82	+0.94
9	12	(Canada) Gilles Villeneuve	Ferrari	1:50.72	1:45.55	1:46.56	+1.14
10	26	(France) Jacques Laffite	Ligier-Matra	1:47.44	1:45.68	1:45.86	+1.27
11	15	(France) Jean-Pierre Jabouille	Renault	1:47.34	1:45.73	1:46.84	+1.32
12	35	(Italy) Riccardo Patrese	Arrows-Ford	1:48.30	1:46.39	1:46.32	+1.91
13	4	(France) Patrick Depailler	Tyrrell-Ford	1:48.67	1:46.37	1:46.74	+1.96
14	27	(Australia) Alan Jones	Williams-Ford	1:47.89	1:46.55	1:46.40	+1.99
15	14	(Brazil) Emerson Fittipaldi	Fittipaldi-Ford	1:47.89	1:47.04	1:46.70	+2.29
16	3	(France) Didier Pironi	Tyrrell-Ford	1:49.36	1:48.10	1:47.12	+2.71
17	17	(Switzerland) Clay Regazzoni	Shadow-Ford	1:50.44	1:48.73	1:48.55	+4.14
18	31	(France) René Arnoux	Martini-Ford	1:49.48	1:48.68	1:49.46	+4.27
19	19	(Italy) Vittorio Brambilla	Surtees-Ford	1:50.39	1:49.23	1:50.07	+4.27
20	16	(West Germany) Hans-Joachim Stuck	Shadow-Ford	1:48.89	1:49.07	1:50.18	+4.48
21	36	(West Germany) Rolf Stommelen	Arrows-Ford	1:51.07	1:49.14	1:50.51	+4.73
22	33	(Italy) Bruno Giacomelli	McLaren-Ford	1:54.67	1:50.77	1:49.53	+5.12
23	18	(United Kingdom) Rupert Keegan	Surtees-Ford	1:52.22	1:50.10	1:49.54	+5.13
24	30	(United States) Brett Lunger	McLaren-Ford	1:51.26	1:49.65	1:49.55	+5.14
25	9	(West Germany) Jochen Mass	ATS-Ford	1:51.53	1:50.10	1:49.90	+5.49
26	10	(Finland) Keke Rosberg	ATS-Ford	1:57.92	1:51.01	1:50.09	+5.68
27	37	(Italy) Arturo Merzario	Merzario-Ford	1:50.11	1:50.47	1:50.80	+5.70
28	22	(Republic of Ireland) Derek Daly	Ensign-Ford	1:54.28	1:50.19	1:50.61	+5.78
29	25	(Mexico) Héctor Rebaque	Lotus-Ford	1:54.03	1:51.54	1:50.40	+5.99

*Positions in red indicate entries that failed to qualify.

=== Race ===
Pos	No	Driver	Constructor	Laps	Time/Retired	Grid	Points
1	5	(United States) Mario Andretti	Lotus-Ford	54	1:38:51.92	2	9
2	6	(Sweden) Ronnie Peterson	Lotus-Ford	54	+ 2.93	5	6
3	7	(United Kingdom) James Hunt	McLaren-Ford	54	+ 19.80	4	4
4	2	(United Kingdom) John Watson	Brabham-Alfa Romeo	54	+ 36.88	1	3
5	27	(Australia) Alan Jones	Williams-Ford	54	+ 41.81	14	2
6	20	(South Africa) Jody Scheckter	Wolf-Ford	54	+ 54.53	7	1
7	26	(France) Jacques Laffite	Ligier-Matra	54	+ 54.74	10	
8	35	(Italy) Riccardo Patrese	Arrows-Ford	54	+ 1:24.88	12	
9	8	(France) Patrick Tambay	McLaren-Ford	54	+ 1:27.06	6	
10	3	(France) Didier Pironi	Tyrrell-Ford	54	+ 1:29.98	16	
11	16	(West Germany) Hans-Joachim Stuck	Shadow-Ford	53	+ 1 Lap	20	
12	12	(Canada) Gilles Villeneuve	Ferrari	53	+ 1 Lap	9	
13	9	(West Germany) Jochen Mass	ATS-Ford	53	+ 1 Lap	25	
14	31	(France) René Arnoux	Martini-Ford	53	+ 1 Lap	18	
15	36	(West Germany) Rolf Stommelen	Arrows-Ford	53	+ 1 Lap	21	
16	10	(Finland) Keke Rosberg	ATS-Ford	52	+ 2 Laps	26	
17	19	(Italy) Vittorio Brambilla	Surtees-Ford	52	+ 2 Laps	19	
18	11	(Argentina) Carlos Reutemann	Ferrari	49	+ 5 Laps	8	
Ret	30	(United States) Brett Lunger	McLaren-Ford	45	Engine	24	
Ret	14	(Brazil) Emerson Fittipaldi	Fittipaldi-Ford	43	Suspension	15	
Ret	18	(United Kingdom) Rupert Keegan	Surtees-Ford	40	Engine	23	
Ret	33	(Italy) Bruno Giacomelli	McLaren-Ford	28	Engine	22	
Ret	1	(Austria) Niki Lauda	Brabham-Alfa Romeo	10	Engine	3	
Ret	4	(France) Patrick Depailler	Tyrrell-Ford	10	Engine	13	
Ret	17	(Switzerland) Clay Regazzoni	Shadow-Ford	4	Electrical	17	
Ret	15	(France) Jean-Pierre Jabouille	Renault	1	Engine	11	
DNQ	37	(Italy) Arturo Merzario	Merzario-Ford				
DNQ	22	(Republic of Ireland) Derek Daly	Ensign-Ford				
DNQ	25	(Mexico) Héctor Rebaque	Lotus-Ford				

== Notes ==
- This was the 9th win of the French Grand Prix for a Ford-powered car. It broke the previous record set by Ferrari at the 1975 French Grand Prix.

== Championship standings after the race ==
Drivers' Championship standings

Pos	Driver	Points
1	(United States) Mario Andretti	45
2	(Sweden) Ronnie Peterson	36
3	(Austria) Niki Lauda	25
4	(France) Patrick Depailler	23
5	(Argentina) Carlos Reutemann	22

Constructors' Championship standings

	Pos	Constructor	Points
	1	(United Kingdom) Lotus-Ford	58
	2	(United Kingdom) Brabham-Alfa Romeo	34
	3	(United Kingdom) Tyrrell-Ford	25
	4	(Italy) Ferrari	22
4	5	(United Kingdom) McLaren-Ford	11

- Note: Only the top five positions are included for both sets of standings.

Previous race: 1978 Swedish Grand Prix	FIA Formula One World Championship; 1978 season	Next race: 1978 British Grand Prix
Previous race: 1977 French Grand Prix	French Grand Prix	Next race: 1979 French Grand Prix
