= 1978 Swedish Grand Prix =

- Race 8 of 16 in the 1978 Formula One season

Race details
- Date: 17 June 1978
- Official name: IX Swedish Grand Prix
- Location: Scandinavian Raceway, Anderstorp, Sweden
- Course: Permanent racing facility
- Course length: 4.031 km (2.505 miles)
- Distance: 70 laps, 282.170 km (175.332 miles)
- Weather: Sunny and warm

Pole position
Driver	(United States) Mario Andretti	Lotus-Ford
- Time: 1:22.058

Fastest lap
Driver	(Austria) Niki Lauda	Brabham-Alfa Romeo
- Time: 1:24.836 on lap 5

Podium
First	(Austria) Niki Lauda	Brabham-Alfa Romeo
Second	(Italy) Riccardo Patrese	Arrows-Ford
Third	(Sweden) Ronnie Peterson	Lotus-Ford

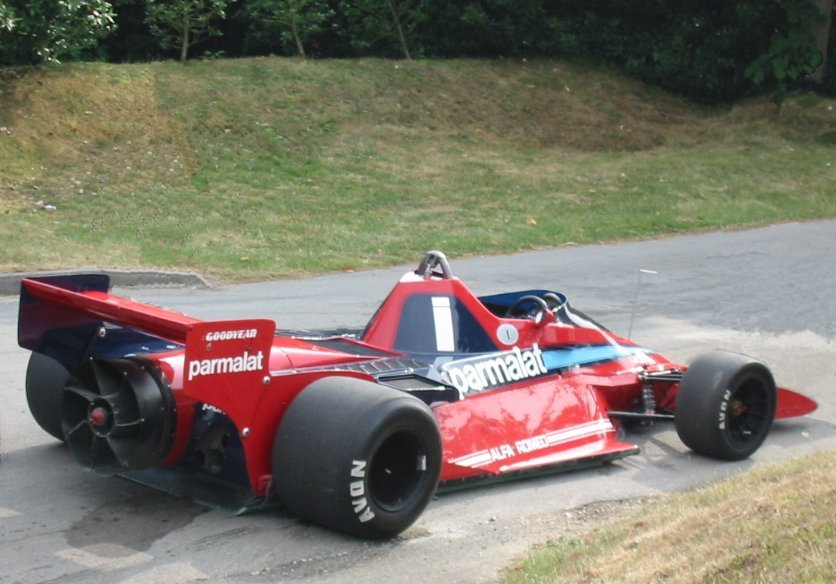
The Brabham BT46B "fan car" at the 2001 Goodwood Festival of Speed.

The 1978 Swedish Grand Prix was a Formula One motor race held on 17 June 1978 at the Scandinavian Raceway. It was the eighth race of the 1978 World Championship of F1 Drivers and the 1978 International Cup for F1 Constructors, and the last Formula One Swedish Grand Prix to date.

The 70-lap race was the only race to feature the Brabham BT46B "fan car", with which Niki Lauda took a commanding victory. Riccardo Patrese finished second in an Arrows, with Ronnie Peterson third in a Lotus.

== Background ==
Responsible for the Brabham win was clever thinking by Brabham's Gordon Murray, who was trying to eclipse Colin Chapman's ground effect invention on the Lotus 79, the skirted car that had swept the front row since its debut at Zolder. Center of the new Brabham BT46B concept was a large fan which drew air through the engine water radiator which was mounted horizontally over the engine. The fan also took ground effect to a higher level (at least engineering-wise) by sucking air from under the car, creating a partial vacuum and creating an enormous amount of downforce. The car appeared to contravene a rule which stated that moving aerodynamic devices were not allowed, but Brabham argued that the rules had been worded to ban devices whose primary function was aerodynamic. As the fan also cooled the engine, Brabham claimed that this, not aerodynamics, was its primary function. Its legality was soon protested, but it was allowed to race, with John Watson and Niki Lauda qualifying 2nd and 3rd behind the Lotus 79 of Mario Andretti (the two drivers did this as to not draw attention to the remarkable advantage that the fan would provide, qualifying on full tanks and in the words of Lauda "doing our best to avoid pole"). This was the 25th Grand Prix start for Wolf and the 10th Grand Prix start for Renault (as both a constructor and as an engine supplier).

== Qualifying ==
This race marked the 100th pole position set by a Ford-powered car.

=== Qualifying classification ===
Pos	No	Driver	Constructor	Time	Gap	Grid
1	5	(United States) Mario Andretti	Lotus-Ford	1:22.058		1
2	2	(United Kingdom) John Watson	Brabham-Alfa Romeo	1:22.737	+0.679	2
3	1	(Austria) Niki Lauda	Brabham-Alfa Romeo	1:22.783	+0.725	3
4	6	(Sweden) Ronnie Peterson	Lotus-Ford	1:23.120	+1.062	4
5	35	(Italy) Riccardo Patrese	Arrows-Ford	1:23.369	+1.311	5
6	20	(South Africa) Jody Scheckter	Wolf-Ford	1:23.621	+1.563	6
7	12	(Canada) Gilles Villeneuve	Ferrari	1:23.730	+1.672	7
8	11	(Argentina) Carlos Reutemann	Ferrari	1:23.737	+1.679	8
9	27	(Australia) Alan Jones	Williams-Ford	1:23.951	+1.893	9
10	15	(France) Jean-Pierre Jabouille	Renault	1:23.963	+1.905	10
11	26	(France) Jacques Laffite	Ligier-Matra	1:24.030	+1.972	11
12	4	(France) Patrick Depailler	Tyrrell-Ford	1:24.203	+2.145	12
13	14	(Brazil) Emerson Fittipaldi	Fittipaldi-Ford	1:24.274	+2.216	13
14	7	(United Kingdom) James Hunt	McLaren-Ford	1:24.761	+2.703	14
15	8	(France) Patrick Tambay	McLaren-Ford	1:24.986	+2.928	15
16	17	(Switzerland) Clay Regazzoni	Shadow-Ford	1:25.007	+2.949	16
17	3	(France) Didier Pironi	Tyrrell-Ford	1:25.813	+3.755	17
18	19	(Italy) Vittorio Brambilla	Surtees-Ford	1:26.618	+4.560	18
19	9	(Germany) Jochen Mass	ATS-Ford	1:26.787	+4.729	19
20	16	(Germany) Hans-Joachim Stuck	Shadow-Ford	1:27.011	+4.953	20
21	25	(Mexico) Héctor Rebaque	Lotus-Ford	1:27.139	+5.081	21
22	37	(Italy) Arturo Merzario	Merzario-Ford	1:27.479	+5.421	22
23	10	(Finland) Keke Rosberg	ATS-Ford	1:27.560	+5.502	23
24	36	(Germany) Rolf Stommelen	Arrows-Ford	1:27.812	+5.754	24
25	18	(United Kingdom) Rupert Keegan	Surtees-Ford	1:28.282	+6.224	DNQ
26	30	(United States) Brett Lunger	McLaren-Ford	1:28.388	+6.330	DNQ
27	22	(Belgium) Jacky Ickx	Ensign-Ford	1:28.400	+6.342	DNQ

*Positions in red indicate entries that failed to qualify.

== Race ==
At the start, Andretti retained the first place, while Lauda got ahead of Watson; on the second lap, he was passed by a fast Riccardo Patrese in the Arrows, and on the third he was passed by the other Lotus of Ronnie Peterson too; the Swede also passed Patrese, but had later to back off due to a tyre puncture. The order then remained the same until lap 20, when Watson was forced to retire by a throttle problem. At the front, Lauda and Andretti were battling for first place, until the American made an error and was forced to let the Austrian through, and eventually dropped out due to a broken valve on his engine. Once Jean-Pierre Jabouille dropped oil onto the track, the Brabham was in a race of its own, seemingly unaffected by the slippery surface. In Lauda's biography, To Hell and Back, he wrote that whilst other cars had to reduce speed to drive carefully over the oil, the Brabhams could simply accelerate (as the fan was activated by the gearbox to get around regulations, this meant that higher speed produced much higher grip) through the affected parts of the track. Lauda went on to win by 34.6 seconds despite according to Lauda "trying not to show how dominant the car really was", followed by Patrese and Peterson in a close finish; the remaining points went to Patrick Tambay, Clay Regazzoni and Emerson Fittipaldi.

After the race, the stewards deemed the car legal. Later, the FIA investigated the car and corroborated Brabham's claim that the fan's primary effect was to cool the car, meeting the letter, if not the spirit, of the rules. The car was judged to have been legal as raced and the Brabham victory stood, but the car never raced again. It is popularly thought that it was banned, but it was actually voluntarily withdrawn by Brabham. This was arguably done by team owner Bernie Ecclestone to avoid a conflict with the other privately owned teams, whose support he needed. 1978 was the year that Ecclestone became chief executive of the Formula One Constructors' Association and led it through the FISA–FOCA war that would lead to the downfall of FISA and give FOCA the right to negotiate television contracts for the Grands Prix, effectively giving Ecclestone commercial control of Formula One which continued for several decades.

This was the 25th fastest lap set by a Brabham and the 1st podium finish for Arrows.

=== Race classification ===
Pos	No	Driver	Constructor	Tyre	Laps	Time/Retired	Grid	Points
1	1	(Austria) Niki Lauda	Brabham-Alfa Romeo	G	70	1:41:00.606	3	9
2	35	(Italy) Riccardo Patrese	Arrows-Ford	G	70	+ 34.019	5	6
3	6	(Sweden) Ronnie Peterson	Lotus-Ford	G	70	+ 34.105	4	4
4	8	(France) Patrick Tambay	McLaren-Ford	G	69	+1 lap	15	3
5	17	(Switzerland) Clay Regazzoni	Shadow-Ford	G	69	+1 lap	16	2
6	14	(Brazil) Emerson Fittipaldi	Fittipaldi-Ford	G	69	+1 lap	13	1
7	26	(France) Jacques Laffite	Ligier-Matra	G	69	+1 lap	11	
8	7	(United Kingdom) James Hunt	McLaren-Ford	G	69	+1 lap	14	
9	12	(Canada) Gilles Villeneuve	Ferrari	M	69	+1 lap	7	
10	11	(Argentina) Carlos Reutemann	Ferrari	M	69	+1 lap	8	
11	16	(West Germany) Hans-Joachim Stuck	Shadow-Ford	G	68	+2 laps	20	
12	25	(Mexico) Héctor Rebaque	Lotus-Ford	G	68	+2 laps	21	
13	9	(West Germany) Jochen Mass	ATS-Ford	G	68	+2 laps	19	
14	36	(West Germany) Rolf Stommelen	Arrows-Ford	G	67	+3 laps	24	
15	10	(Finland) Keke Rosberg	ATS-Ford	G	63	+7 laps	23	
NC	37	(Italy) Arturo Merzario	Merzario-Ford	G	62	+8 laps	22	
Ret	5	(United States) Mario Andretti	Lotus-Ford	G	46	Engine	1	
Ret	27	(Australia) Alan Jones	Williams-Ford	G	46	Wheel	9	
Ret	4	(France) Patrick Depailler	Tyrrell-Ford	G	42	Suspension	12	
Ret	15	(France) Jean-Pierre Jabouille	Renault	M	28	Engine	10	
Ret	2	(United Kingdom) John Watson	Brabham-Alfa Romeo	G	19	Spun off/Throttle	2	
Ret	20	(South Africa) Jody Scheckter	Wolf-Ford	G	16	Overheating	6	
Ret	3	(France) Didier Pironi	Tyrrell-Ford	G	8	Accident	17	
Ret	19	(Italy) Vittorio Brambilla	Surtees-Ford	G	7	Accident	18	
DNQ	18	(United Kingdom) Rupert Keegan	Surtees-Ford	G				
DNQ	30	(United States) Brett Lunger	McLaren-Ford	G				
DNQ	22	(Belgium) Jacky Ickx	Ensign-Ford	G				

== Championship standings after the race ==
Drivers' Championship standings

	Pos	Driver	Points
	1	(United States) Mario Andretti	36
	2	(Sweden) Ronnie Peterson	30
2	3	(Austria) Niki Lauda	25
1	4	(France) Patrick Depailler	23
1	5	(Argentina) Carlos Reutemann	22

Constructors' Championship standings

	Pos	Constructor	Points
	1	(United Kingdom) Lotus-Ford	49
2	2	(United Kingdom) Brabham-Alfa Romeo	31
1	3	(United Kingdom) Tyrrell-Ford	25
1	4	(Italy) Ferrari	22
	5	(France) Ligier-Matra	10

- Note: Only the top five positions are included for both sets of standings.

Previous race: 1978 Spanish Grand Prix	FIA Formula One World Championship; 1978 season	Next race: 1978 French Grand Prix
Previous race: 1977 Swedish Grand Prix	Swedish Grand Prix	Next race: N/A
