= 1978 British Grand Prix =

- Race 10 of 16 in the 1978 Formula One season

Race details
- Date: 16 July 1978
- Official name: XXXI John Player British Grand Prix
- Location: Brands Hatch, Kent, England
- Course: Permanent racing facility
- Course length: 4.206 km (2.613 miles)
- Distance: 76 laps, 319.656 km (198.588 miles)
- Weather: Dry

Pole position
Driver	(Sweden) Ronnie Peterson	Lotus-Ford
- Time: 1:16.80

Fastest lap
Driver	(Austria) Niki Lauda	Brabham-Alfa Romeo
- Time: 1:18.60 on lap 72

Podium
First	(Argentina) Carlos Reutemann	Ferrari
Second	(Austria) Niki Lauda	Brabham-Alfa Romeo
Third	(United Kingdom) John Watson	Brabham-Alfa Romeo

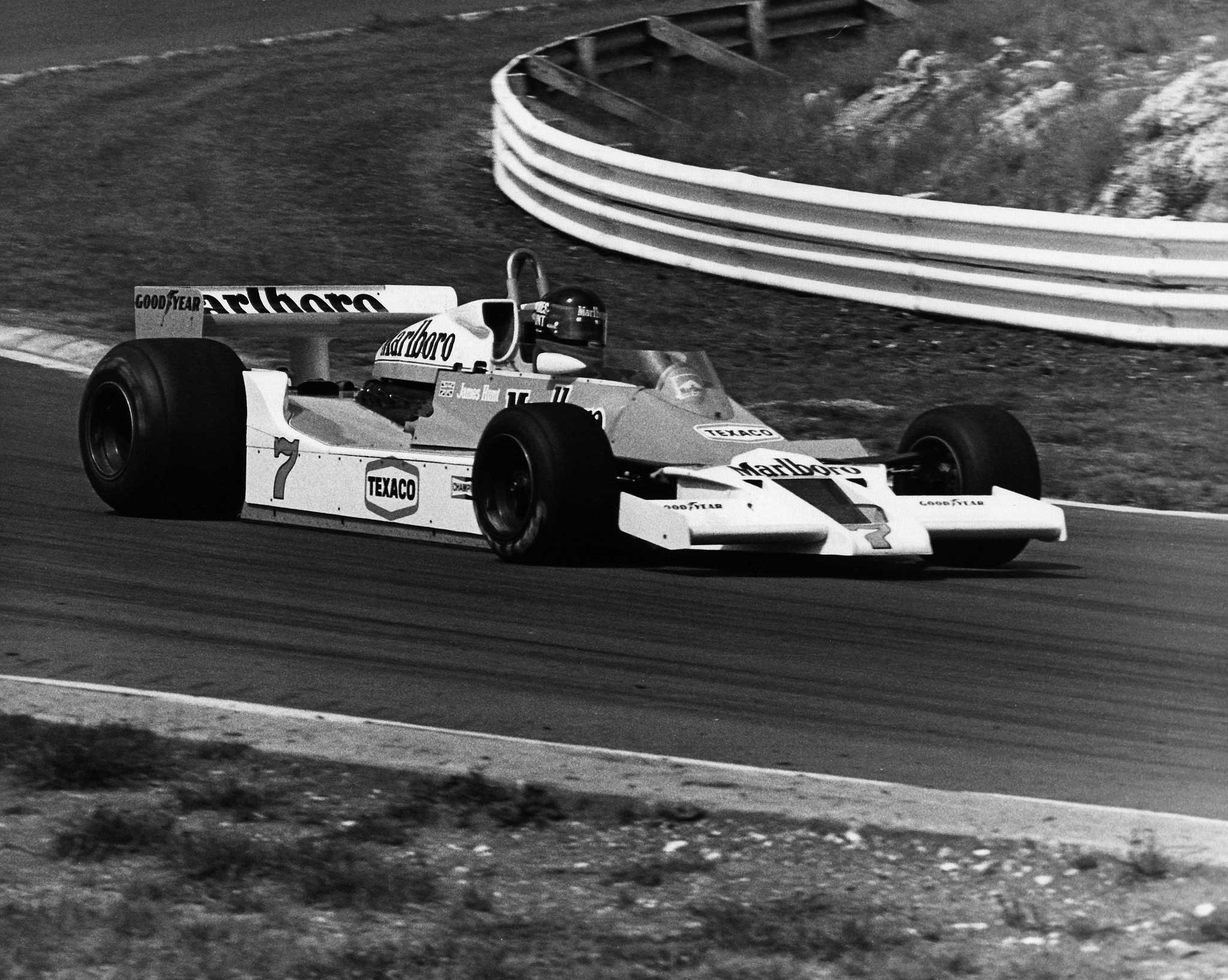
James Hunt, in a McLaren M26, crashed out on lap 8.

The 1978 British Grand Prix (formally the XXXI John Player British Grand Prix) was a Formula One motor race held at Brands Hatch on 16 July 1978. It was the tenth race of the 1978 World Championship of F1 Drivers and the 1978 International Cup for F1 Constructors.

The 76-lap race was won by Argentinian driver Carlos Reutemann, driving a Ferrari. After starting from eighth position, Reutemann worked his way up the field and took the lead on lap 60, eventually winning by 1.2 seconds from Austrian driver Niki Lauda in the Brabham-Alfa Romeo. Lauda's Northern Irish teammate, John Watson, finished third.

== Report ==
=== Qualifying ===
With a total of 31 cars on the entry list, it was decided to forbid the Martini of René Arnoux from taking part, thus leaving 30 cars for qualifying.

As expected, the Lotuses filled the front row of the grid, although on this occasion Ronnie Peterson was ahead of Mario Andretti. Jody Scheckter in the Wolf and Niki Lauda in the Brabham made up the second row, while on the third were Riccardo Patrese in the Arrows and Alan Jones in the Williams. The top ten was completed by Jacques Laffite in the Ligier, Carlos Reutemann in the Ferrari, John Watson in the second Brabham and Patrick Depailler in the Tyrrell.

=== Race ===
At the start of the race, Andretti took the lead from Peterson, with Scheckter holding third and Jones moving up to fourth. The Lotuses quickly pulled out a large gap, and looked set to dominate, until Peterson retired on lap 7 with a fuel leak. Andretti continued to lead until a puncture forced him to pit on lap 24, before his engine failed five laps later.

Scheckter inherited the lead, closely followed by Jones, Lauda and Patrese. On lap 27, Jones's driveshaft failed, before Scheckter began to suffer gearbox problems. On lap 34, Lauda overtook the South African, who retired three laps later. This left Patrese in second, with Reutemann up to third, Watson fourth, Didier Pironi fifth in the second Tyrrell and Keke Rosberg sixth in the ATS.

On lap 41, Patrese suffered a rear puncture which led to a suspension failure. Pironi also retired on this lap with gearbox trouble, promoting Rosberg to fourth. The Finn soon came under pressure from Depailler, who got by on lap 49.

Reutemann closed up to Lauda and passed him for the lead on lap 60, as the two were lapping the McLaren of Bruno Giacomelli. The Argentine held off the Austrian for the remaining laps, eventually taking his third win of the season by 1.2 seconds. Watson finished 36 seconds behind Lauda and 36 ahead of Depailler, while a suspension failure for Rosberg on lap 60 meant that the final points went to Hans-Joachim Stuck in the Shadow and Patrick Tambay in the McLaren.

== Classification ==
=== Qualifying ===
Pos.	Driver	Constructor	Time/Gap
1	(Sweden) Ronnie Peterson	Lotus–Ford	1:16.80
2	(United States) Mario Andretti	Lotus–Ford	+0.26
3	(South Africa) Jody Scheckter	Wolf–Ford	+0.57
4	(Austria) Niki Lauda	Brabham–Alfa Romeo	+0.62
5	(Italy) Riccardo Patrese	Arrows–Ford	+1.48
6	(Australia) Alan Jones	Williams–Ford	+1.56
7	(France) Jacques Laffite	Ligier–Matra	+1.64
8	(Argentina) Carlos Reutemann	Ferrari	+1.65
9	(United Kingdom) John Watson	Brabham–Alfa Romeo	+1.77
10	(France) Patrick Depailler	Tyrrell–Ford	+1.93
11	(Brazil) Emerson Fittipaldi	Fittipaldi–Ford	+1.98
12	(France) Jean-Pierre Jabouille	Renault	+2.08
13	(Canada) Gilles Villeneuve	Ferrari	+2.19
14	(United Kingdom) James Hunt	McLaren–Ford	+2.25
15	(Republic of Ireland) Derek Daly	Ensign–Ford	+2.33
16	(Italy) Bruno Giacomelli	McLaren–Ford	+2.99
17	(Switzerland) Clay Regazzoni	Shadow–Ford	+3.03
18	(West Germany) Hans-Joachim Stuck	Shadow–Ford	+3.18
19	(France) Didier Pironi	Tyrrell–Ford	+3.19
20	(France) Patrick Tambay	McLaren–Ford	+3.34
21	(Mexico) Héctor Rebaque	Lotus–Ford	+3.44
22	(Finland) Keke Rosberg	ATS–Ford	+3.47
23	(Italy) Arturo Merzario	Merzario–Ford	+3.55
24	(United States) Brett Lunger	McLaren–Ford	+3.59
25	(Italy) Vittorio Brambilla	Surtees–Ford	+3.90
26	(West Germany) Jochen Mass	ATS–Ford	+3.91
27	(United Kingdom) Rupert Keegan	Surtees–Ford	+3.93
28	(West Germany) Rolf Stommelen	Arrows–Ford	+4.25
29	(United Kingdom) Geoff Lees	Ensign–Ford	+4.61
30	(United Kingdom) Tony Trimmer	McLaren–Ford	+11.48

*Positions in red indicate entries that failed to qualify.

=== Race ===
Pos	No	Driver	Constructor	Tyre	Laps	Time/Retired	Grid	Points
1	11	(Argentina) Carlos Reutemann	Ferrari	M	76	1:42:12.39	8	9
2	1	(Austria) Niki Lauda	Brabham-Alfa Romeo	G	76	+ 1.23	4	6
3	2	(United Kingdom) John Watson	Brabham-Alfa Romeo	G	76	+ 37.25	9	4
4	4	(France) Patrick Depailler	Tyrrell-Ford	G	76	+ 1:13.27	10	3
5	16	(West Germany) Hans-Joachim Stuck	Shadow-Ford	G	75	+ 1 Lap	18	2
6	8	(France) Patrick Tambay	McLaren-Ford	G	75	+ 1 Lap	20	1
7	33	(Italy) Bruno Giacomelli	McLaren-Ford	G	75	+ 1 Lap	16	
8	30	(United States) Brett Lunger	McLaren-Ford	G	75	+ 1 Lap	24	
9	19	(Italy) Vittorio Brambilla	Surtees-Ford	G	75	+ 1 Lap	25	
10	26	(France) Jacques Laffite	Ligier-Matra	G	73	+ 3 Laps	7	
NC	9	(West Germany) Jochen Mass	ATS-Ford	G	65	+ 11 Laps	26	
Ret	10	(Finland) Keke Rosberg	ATS-Ford	G	59	Suspension	22	
Ret	17	(Switzerland) Clay Regazzoni	Shadow-Ford	G	49	Gearbox	17	
Ret	15	(France) Jean-Pierre Jabouille	Renault	M	46	Turbo	12	
Ret	35	(Italy) Riccardo Patrese	Arrows-Ford	G	40	Suspension	5	
Ret	3	(France) Didier Pironi	Tyrrell-Ford	G	40	Gearbox	19	
Ret	20	(South Africa) Jody Scheckter	Wolf-Ford	G	36	Gearbox	3	
Ret	14	(Brazil) Emerson Fittipaldi	Fittipaldi-Ford	G	32	Engine	11	
Ret	37	(Italy) Arturo Merzario	Merzario-Ford	G	32	Fuel System	23	
Ret	22	(Republic of Ireland) Derek Daly	Ensign-Ford	G	30	Wheel	15	
Ret	5	(United States) Mario Andretti	Lotus-Ford	G	28	Engine	2	
Ret	27	(Australia) Alan Jones	Williams-Ford	G	26	Transmission	6	
Ret	12	(Canada) Gilles Villeneuve	Ferrari	M	19	Transmission	13	
Ret	25	(Mexico) Héctor Rebaque	Lotus-Ford	G	15	Gearbox	21	
Ret	7	(United Kingdom) James Hunt	McLaren-Ford	G	7	Accident	14	
Ret	6	(Sweden) Ronnie Peterson	Lotus-Ford	G	6	Fuel Leak	1	
DNQ	18	(United Kingdom) Rupert Keegan	Surtees-Ford	G				
DNQ	36	(West Germany) Rolf Stommelen	Arrows-Ford	G				
DNQ	23	(United Kingdom) Geoff Lees	Ensign-Ford	G				
DNQ	40	(United Kingdom) Tony Trimmer	McLaren-Ford	G				

== Notes ==
- This was the Formula One World Championship debut for British driver Geoff Lees.
- This was the 5th Grand Prix start for Finnish driver.
- This race marked the 50th podium finish for an Austrian driver.
- This was the 50th Grand Prix start for Fittipaldi, the 10th Grand Prix start for Williams and the 5th Grand Prix start for Merzario.
- This was the 9th win of the British Grand Prix for Ferrari. It broke the previous record set by Lotus at the 1972 British Grand Prix.

== Championship standings after the race ==
Drivers' Championship standings

	Pos	Driver	Points
	1	(United States) Mario Andretti	45
	2	(Sweden) Ronnie Peterson	36
2	3	(Argentina) Carlos Reutemann	31
1	4	(Austria) Niki Lauda	31
1	5	(France) Patrick Depailler	26

Constructors' Championship standings

	Pos	Constructor	Points
	1	(United Kingdom) Lotus-Ford	58
	2	(United Kingdom) Brabham-Alfa Romeo	40
1	3	(Italy) Ferrari	31
1	4	(United Kingdom) Tyrrell-Ford	28
	5	(United Kingdom) McLaren-Ford	12

- Note: Only the top five positions are included for both sets of standings.

Previous race: 1978 French Grand Prix	FIA Formula One World Championship; 1978 season	Next race: 1978 German Grand Prix
Previous race: 1977 British Grand Prix	British Grand Prix	Next race: 1979 British Grand Prix
Awards
Preceded by 1977 British Grand Prix	Formula One Promotional Trophy for Race Promoter; 1978	Succeeded by 1979 Italian Grand Prix
