= Peter Wright (engineer) =

British engineer (1946–2025)

Peter Wright (26 May 1946 – 6 November 2025) was a British engineer, best known for his work in Formula One motor racing between the 1960s and 1990s. He had a very significant influence on the application of aerodynamics within the sport, particularly in the development of ground effect theory in the late 1970s while working with Team Lotus, during which time the team produced the 1978 championship-winning Lotus 79. After retiring from the sport in 1994, Wright was employed as a technical consultant to its governing body, the FIA, and was head of their Safety Commission for a number of years.

Wright died on 6 November 2025, at the age of 79.
