= 1978 Belgian Grand Prix =

- Race 6 of 16 in the 1978 Formula One season

Race details
- Date: 21 May 1978
- Location: Circuit Zolder, Heusden-Zolder, Belgium
- Course length: 4.262 km (2.648 miles)
- Distance: 70 laps, 298.340 km (185.380 miles)
- Weather: Dry

Pole position
Driver	(United States) Mario Andretti	Lotus-Ford
- Time: 1:20.90

Fastest lap
Driver	(Sweden) Ronnie Peterson	Lotus-Ford
- Time: 1:23.13 on lap 66

Podium
First	(United States) Mario Andretti	Lotus-Ford
Second	(Sweden) Ronnie Peterson	Lotus-Ford
Third	(Argentina) Carlos Reutemann	Ferrari

The 1978 Belgian Grand Prix was a Formula One motor race held on 21 May 1978 at Zolder. It was the sixth race of the 1978 World Championship of F1 Drivers and the 1978 International Cup for F1 Constructors. The 70-lap race was won from pole position by Mario Andretti, driving the new Lotus 79. Teammate Ronnie Peterson was second in the older Lotus 78, with Carlos Reutemann third in a Ferrari.

== Qualifying ==
=== Pre-qualifying classification ===
Pos.	Driver	Constructor	Time
1	Rolf Stommelen	Arrows-Ford	1:23.76
2	Keke Rosberg	Theodore-Ford	1:24.46
3	René Arnoux	Martini-Ford	1:24.58
4	Bruno Giacomelli	McLaren-Ford	1:24.65
5	Brett Lunger	McLaren-Ford	1:24.91
6	Héctor Rebaque	Lotus-Ford	1:25.10
7	Arturo Merzario	Merzario-Ford	1:26.69

*Positions in red indicate entries that failed to pre-qualify.

=== Qualifying classification ===
Pos.	Driver	Constructor	Time	No
1	Mario Andretti	Lotus-Ford	1:20.90	1
2	Carlos Reutemann	Ferrari	1:21.69	2
3	Niki Lauda	Brabham-Alfa Romeo	1:21.70	3
4	Gilles Villeneuve	Ferrari	1:21.77	4
5	Jody Scheckter	Wolf-Ford	1:22.12	5
6	James Hunt	McLaren-Ford	1:22.50	6
7	Ronnie Peterson	Lotus-Ford	1:22.62	7
8	Riccardo Patrese	Arrows-Ford	1:23.25	8
9	John Watson	Brabham-Alfa Romeo	1:23.26	9
10	Jean-Pierre Jabouille	Renault	1:23.58	10
11	Alan Jones	Williams-Ford	1:23.71	11
12	Vittorio Brambilla	Surtees-Ford	1:23.78	12
13	Patrick Depailler	Tyrrell-Ford	1:23.82	13
14	Jacques Laffite	Ligier-Matra	1:23.90	14
15	Emerson Fittipaldi	Fittipaldi-Ford	1:24.11	15
16	Jochen Mass	ATS-Ford	1:24.14	16
17	Rolf Stommelen	Arrows-Ford	1:24.14	17
18	Clay Regazzoni	Shadow-Ford	1:24.18	18
19	René Arnoux	Martini-Ford	1:24.28	19
20	Hans-Joachim Stuck	Shadow-Ford	1:24.47	20
21	Bruno Giacomelli	McLaren-Ford	1:24.81	21
22	Jacky Ickx	Ensign-Ford	1:24.82	22
23	Didier Pironi	Tyrrell-Ford	1:24.85	23
24	Brett Lunger	McLaren-Ford	1:24.99	24
25	Rupert Keegan	Surtees-Ford	1:25.40	DNQ
26	Derek Daly	Hesketh-Ford	1:25.69	DNQ
27	Keke Rosberg	Theodore-Ford	1:25.87	DNQ
28	Alberto Colombo	ATS-Ford	1:26.01	DNQ

*Positions in red indicate entries that failed to qualify.

== Race ==
=== Report ===
The main news before the Belgian Grand Prix was that the new Lotus 79 was now ready to race, and immediately Mario Andretti showed its pace by taking pole comfortably from Carlos Reutemann and Niki Lauda. He converted it to a first-corner lead, whereas Reutemann had a bad start and got swamped by the field, causing a chain reaction in which Lauda was hit by Jody Scheckter and had to retire. This left Gilles Villeneuve second and Ronnie Peterson third but neither could keep pace with Andretti who was able to drive away.

The first 40 laps went without incident until Villeneuve suffered a puncture and had to pit which dropped him back down to fifth, and a few laps later Peterson also pitted for new tyres leaving the charging Reutemann second, ahead of Jacques Laffite's Ligier. Peterson on the new tyres was much quicker and was able to pass them both in the closing stages, and Laffite made an attempt to pass Reutemann on the last lap but they collided and Laffite was out. Andretti cruised to an untroubled victory, with Peterson making it a Lotus 1–2, and Reutemann completing the podium.

=== Classification ===
Pos	No	Driver	Constructor	Tyre	Laps	Time/Retired	Grid	Points
1	5	(United States) Mario Andretti	Lotus-Ford	G	70	1:39:52.02	1	9
2	6	(Sweden) Ronnie Peterson	Lotus-Ford	G	70	+9.90	7	6
3	11	(Argentina) Carlos Reutemann	Ferrari	MI	70	+24.34	2	4
4	12	(Canada) Gilles Villeneuve	Ferrari	MI	70	+47.04	4	3
5	26	(France) Jacques Laffite	Ligier-Matra	G	69	Accident	14	2
6	3	(France) Didier Pironi	Tyrrell-Ford	G	69	+1 lap	23	1
7	30	(United States) Brett Lunger	McLaren-Ford	G	69	+1 lap	24	
8	33	(Italy) Bruno Giacomelli	McLaren-Ford	G	69	+1 lap	21	
9	31	(France) René Arnoux	Martini-Ford	G	68	+2 laps	19	
10	27	(Australia) Alan Jones	Williams-Ford	G	68	+2 laps	11	
11	9	(West Germany) Jochen Mass	ATS-Ford	G	68	+2 laps	16	
12	22	(Belgium) Jacky Ickx	Ensign-Ford	G	64	+6 laps	22	
13	19	(Italy) Vittorio Brambilla	Surtees-Ford	G	63	Engine	12	
Ret	16	(West Germany) Hans-Joachim Stuck	Shadow-Ford	G	56	Spun off	10	
NC	15	(France) Jean-Pierre Jabouille	Renault	MI	56	+14 laps	20	
Ret	20	(South Africa) Jody Scheckter	Wolf-Ford	G	53	Spun off	5	
Ret	4	(France) Patrick Depailler	Tyrrell-Ford	G	51	Gearbox	13	
Ret	17	(Switzerland) Clay Regazzoni	Shadow-Ford	G	40	Transmission	18	
Ret	35	(Italy) Riccardo Patrese	Arrows-Ford	G	31	Suspension	8	
Ret	36	(West Germany) Rolf Stommelen	Arrows-Ford	G	26	Spun off	17	
Ret	2	(United Kingdom) John Watson	Brabham-Alfa Romeo	G	18	Accident	9	
Ret	1	(Austria) Niki Lauda	Brabham-Alfa Romeo	G	0	Accident	3	
Ret	7	(United Kingdom) James Hunt	McLaren-Ford	G	0	Accident	6	
Ret	14	(Brazil) Emerson Fittipaldi	Fittipaldi-Ford	G	0	Accident	15	
DNQ	18	(United Kingdom) Rupert Keegan	Surtees-Ford	G				
DNQ	24	(Republic of Ireland) Derek Daly	Hesketh-Ford	G				
DNQ	32	(Finland) Keke Rosberg	Theodore-Ford	G				
DNQ	10	(Italy) Alberto Colombo	ATS-Ford	G				
DNPQ	25	(Mexico) Héctor Rebaque	Lotus-Ford	G				
DNPQ	37	(Italy) Arturo Merzario	Merzario-Ford	G				
DNP	23	(Belgium) Bernard de Dryver	Ensign-Ford	G				
DNP	29	(Belgium) Patrick Nève	March-Ford	G				

== Notes ==
- This was the Formula One World Championship debut for Italian driver Alberto Colombo.

== Championship standings after the race ==
Drivers' Championship standings

	Pos	Driver	Points
2	1	(United States) Mario Andretti	27
1	2	(France) Patrick Depailler	23
1	3	(Argentina) Carlos Reutemann	22
1	4	(Sweden) Ronnie Peterson	20
1	5	(Austria) Niki Lauda	16

Constructors' Championship standings

	Pos	Constructor	Points
	1	(United Kingdom) Lotus-Ford	36
	2	(United Kingdom) Tyrrell-Ford	25
1	3	(Italy) Ferrari	22
1	4	(United Kingdom) Brabham-Alfa Romeo	20
	5	(Brazil) Fittipaldi-Ford	6

- Note: Only the top five positions are included for both sets of standings.

Previous race: 1978 Monaco Grand Prix	FIA Formula One World Championship; 1978 season	Next race: 1978 Spanish Grand Prix
Previous race: 1977 Belgian Grand Prix	Belgian Grand Prix	Next race: 1979 Belgian Grand Prix
