= 1979 Spanish Grand Prix =

Formula One motor race held in 1979

- Race 5 of 15 in the 1979 Formula One season

Race details
- Date: 29 April 1979
- Official name: XXV Gran Premio de España
- Location: Jarama, Spain
- Course: Permanent racing facility
- Course length: 3.404 km (2.115 miles)
- Distance: 75 laps, 255.3 km (158.625 miles)
- Weather: Dry

Pole position
| Driver | (France) Jacques Laffite | Ligier-Ford |
- Time: 1:14.50

Fastest lap
| Driver | (Canada) Gilles Villeneuve | Ferrari |
- Time: 1:16.44 on lap 72

Podium
| First | (France) Patrick Depailler | Ligier-Ford |
| Second | (Argentina) Carlos Reutemann | Lotus-Ford |
| Third | (United States) Mario Andretti | Lotus-Ford |

The 1979 Spanish Grand Prix was a Formula One motor race held on 29 April 1979 at the Circuito Permanente del Jarama near Madrid, Spain. It was race 5 of 15 in both the 1979 World Championship of F1 Drivers and the 1979 International Cup for F1 Constructors. The 75-lap race was won by Patrick Depailler, driving a Ligier-Ford, with Lotus drivers Carlos Reutemann and Mario Andretti second and third respectively.

== Qualifying ==
=== Qualifying classification ===
| Pos. | Driver | Constructor | Time | No |
|---|---|---|---|---|
| 1 | Jacques Laffite | Ligier-Ford | 1:14,50 | 1 |
| 2 | Patrick Depailler | Ligier-Ford | 1:14,79 | 2 |
| 3 | Gilles Villeneuve | Ferrari | 1:14,82 | 3 |
| 4 | Mario Andretti | Lotus-Ford | 1:15,07 | 4 |
| 5 | Jody Scheckter | Ferrari | 1:15,10 | 5 |
| 6 | Niki Lauda | Brabham-Alfa Romeo | 1:15,45 | 6 |
| 7 | Nelson Piquet | Brabham-Alfa Romeo | 1:15,61 | 7 |
| 8 | Carlos Reutemann | Lotus-Ford | 1:15,67 | 8 |
| 9 | Jean-Pierre Jabouille | Renault | 1:15,78 | 9 |
| 10 | Didier Pironi | Tyrrell-Ford | 1:16,04 | 10 |
| 11 | René Arnoux | Renault | 1:16,06 | 11 |
| 12 | Jean-Pierre Jarier | Tyrrell-Ford | 1:16,08 | 12 |
| 13 | Alan Jones | Williams-Ford | 1:16,23 | 13 |
| 14 | Clay Regazzoni | Williams-Ford | 1:16,61 | 14 |
| 15 | James Hunt | Wolf-Ford | 1:16,88 | 15 |
| 16 | Riccardo Patrese | Arrows-Ford | 1:16,92 | 16 |
| 17 | Jochen Mass | Arrows-Ford | 1:17,04 | 17 |
| 18 | John Watson | McLaren-Ford | 1:17,11 | 18 |
| 19 | Emerson Fittipaldi | Fittipaldi-Ford | 1:17,35 | 19 |
| 20 | Patrick Tambay | McLaren-Ford | 1:17,45 | 20 |
| 21 | Hans-Joachim Stuck | ATS-Ford | 1:17,57 | 21 |
| 22 | Elio de Angelis | Shadow-Ford | 1:17,85 | 22 |
| 23 | Héctor Rebaque | Lotus-Ford | 1:18,42 | 23 |
| 24 | Jan Lammers | Shadow-Ford | 1:18,79 | 24 |
| DNQ | Derek Daly | Ensign-Ford | 1:19,30 | — |
| DNQ | Arturo Merzario | Merzario-Ford | 1:20,46 | — |
| DNQ | Gianfranco Brancatelli | Kauhsen-Ford | 1:23,24 | — |

== Race ==
=== Classification ===
| Pos | No | Driver | Constructor | Tyre | Laps | Time/Retired | Grid | Points |
|---|---|---|---|---|---|---|---|---|
| 1 | 25 | (France) Patrick Depailler | Ligier-Ford | G | 75 | 1:39:11.84 | 2 | 9 |
| 2 | 2 | (Argentina) Carlos Reutemann | Lotus-Ford | G | 75 | + 20.94 | 8 | 6 |
| 3 | 1 | (United States) Mario Andretti | Lotus-Ford | G | 75 | + 27.31 | 4 | 4 |
| 4 | 11 | (South Africa) Jody Scheckter | Ferrari | MI | 75 | + 28.68 | 5 | 3 |
| 5 | 4 | (France) Jean-Pierre Jarier | Tyrrell-Ford | G | 75 | + 30.39 | 12 | 2 |
| 6 | 3 | (France) Didier Pironi | Tyrrell-Ford | G | 75 | + 48.43 | 10 | 1 |
| 7 | 12 | (Canada) Gilles Villeneuve | Ferrari | MI | 75 | + 52.31 | 3 | |
| 8 | 30 | (West Germany) Jochen Mass | Arrows-Ford | G | 75 | + 1:14.84 | 17 | |
| 9 | 16 | (France) René Arnoux | Renault | MI | 74 | + 1 Lap | 11 | |
| 10 | 29 | (Italy) Riccardo Patrese | Arrows-Ford | G | 74 | + 1 Lap | 16 | |
| 11 | 14 | (Brazil) Emerson Fittipaldi | Fittipaldi-Ford | G | 74 | + 1 Lap | 19 | |
| 12 | 17 | (Netherlands) Jan Lammers | Shadow-Ford | G | 73 | + 2 Laps | 24 | |
| 13 | 8 | (France) Patrick Tambay | McLaren-Ford | G | 72 | + 3 Laps | 20 | |
| 14 | 9 | (West Germany) Hans-Joachim Stuck | ATS-Ford | G | 69 | + 6 Laps | 21 | |
| Ret | 5 | (Austria) Niki Lauda | Brabham-Alfa Romeo | G | 63 | Water Leak | 6 | |
| Ret | 31 | (Mexico) Héctor Rebaque | Lotus-Ford | G | 58 | Engine | 23 | |
| Ret | 27 | (Australia) Alan Jones | Williams-Ford | G | 54 | Gearbox | 13 | |
| Ret | 18 | (Italy) Elio de Angelis | Shadow-Ford | G | 52 | Engine | 22 | |
| Ret | 28 | (Switzerland) Clay Regazzoni | Williams-Ford | G | 32 | Engine | 14 | |
| Ret | 20 | (United Kingdom) James Hunt | Wolf-Ford | G | 26 | Brakes | 15 | |
| Ret | 15 | (France) Jean-Pierre Jabouille | Renault | MI | 21 | Turbo | 9 | |
| Ret | 7 | (United Kingdom) John Watson | McLaren-Ford | G | 21 | Engine | 18 | |
| Ret | 26 | (France) Jacques Laffite | Ligier-Ford | G | 15 | Engine | 1 | |
| Ret | 6 | (Brazil) Nelson Piquet | Brabham-Alfa Romeo | G | 15 | Injection | 7 | |
| DNQ | 22 | (Republic of Ireland) Derek Daly | Ensign-Ford | G | | | | |
| DNQ | 24 | (Italy) Arturo Merzario | Merzario-Ford | G | | | | |
| DNQ | 36 | (Italy) Gianfranco Brancatelli | Kauhsen-Ford | G | | | | |

== Notes ==
- This was the Formula One World Championship debut for German constructor Kauhsen.

== Championship standings after the race ==
Drivers' Championship standings

| | Pos | Driver | Points |
|---|---|---|---|
| | 1 | (Canada) Gilles Villeneuve | 20 |
| 3 | 2 | (France) Patrick Depailler | 20 |
| 1 | 3 | (France) Jacques Laffite | 18 |
| | 4 | (Argentina) Carlos Reutemann | 18 |
| 2 | 5 | (South Africa) Jody Scheckter | 16 |

Constructors' Championship standings

| | Pos | Constructor | Points |
|---|---|---|---|
| 1 | 1 | (France) Ligier-Ford | 38 |
| 1 | 2 | (Italy) Ferrari | 36 |
| | 3 | (United Kingdom) Lotus-Ford | 30 |
| | 4 | (United Kingdom) Tyrrell-Ford | 11 |
| | 5 | (United Kingdom) McLaren-Ford | 4 |

- Note: Only the top five positions are included for both sets of standings.

| Previous race: 1979 United States Grand Prix West | FIA Formula One World Championship; 1979 season | Next race: 1979 Belgian Grand Prix |
| Previous race: 1978 Spanish Grand Prix | Spanish Grand Prix | Next race: 1980 Spanish Grand Prix |
