= Ligier JS7 =

Formula One race car

Ligier JS7 Ligier JS7/9
- Category: Formula One
- Constructor: Ligier
- Designers: Gérard Ducarouge (Technical Director); Michel Beaujon (Chief Designer); Robert Choulet (Head of Aerodynamics)
- Predecessor: JS5
- Successor: JS9

Technical specifications
- Chassis: Aluminium monocoque
- Axle track: Front: 1,536 mm (60.5 in); Rear: 1,600 mm (63.0 in)
- Wheelbase: 2,608 mm (102.7 in)
- Engine: Matra MS73 and MS76, 2,993 cc (182.6 cu in), 60° V12, NA, mid-engine, longitudinally mounted
- Transmission: Hewland 2-200 TL 6-speed manual
- Weight: 580 kg (1,279 lb)
- Fuel: Shell
- Tyres: Goodyear

Competition history
- Notable entrants: Ligier Gitanes
- Notable drivers: (France) Jacques Laffite (France) Jean-Pierre Jarier
- Debut: 1977 Argentine Grand Prix
- First win: 1977 Swedish Grand Prix
- Last win: 1977 Swedish Grand Prix
- Last event: 1978 Swedish Grand Prix
Races	Wins	Poles	F/Laps
23	1	0	1
- Constructors' Championships: 0
- Drivers' Championships: 0

The Ligier JS7 was a Formula One racing car manufactured by Ligier. As with the preceding JS5, the letters "JS" were in tribute to Guy Ligier's friend Jo Schlesser who was killed in the 1968 French Grand Prix.

== Design ==
Aside from using the Matra V12 rather than the usual Ford Cosworth unit, the JS7 was a very conventional design with a Hewland six-speed transmission and a longitudinally mounted engine and wishbone suspension. The JS7 forwent the giant air intake of the preceding JS5. It was developed around Matra's new MS76 engine, mounted 7.6 cm (3 in) lower than in the JS5. The front wing design echoed that of the Ferrari 312T. The first two JS7 chassis used modified JS5 monocoques; the third and final example was built from the ground up.

In the beginning of the 1977 season, Ligier still used the four-year old MS73 engine design as the new one was not yet ready to race - the new MS76 suffered from problems with the valvetrain in Argentina and Brazil and had a narrower torque band than the old engine. The MS76 engine was not deemed fully ready to race until the Swedish Grand Prix in June, where Laffite won.

== Racing history ==
The JS7 competed in the 1977 Formula One season and the first two races of the 1978 season. An updated version, dubbed the JS7/9 was used for three races in 1978 until the definitive 1978 car, the JS9 was ready. Laffite's victory in the 1977 Swedish Grand Prix was the first all-French victory - chassis, engine and driver - in World Championship history.

== Complete Formula One World Championship results ==
(key)

Year	Chassis	Engine	Tyres	Drivers	1	2	3	4	5	6	7	8	9	10	11	12	13	14	15	16	17	Points	WCC
1977	JS7	Matra V12	G		ARG	BRA	RSA	USW	ESP	MON	BEL	SWE	FRA	GBR	GER	AUT	NED	ITA	USA	CAN	JPN	18	8th
1977	JS7	Matra V12	G	Jacques Laffite	NC	Ret	Ret	9	7	7	Ret	1	8	6	Ret	Ret	2	8	7	Ret	5	18	8th
1977	JS7	Matra V12	G	Jean-Pierre Jarier																	Ret	18	8th
1978	JS7	Matra V12	G		ARG	BRA	RSA	USW	MON	BEL	ESP	SWE	FRA	GBR	GER	AUT	NED	ITA	USA	CAN		19*	6th
1978	JS7	Matra V12	G	Jacques Laffite	16	9		5														19*	6th
1978	JS7/9	Matra V12	G	Jacques Laffite			5			5		7										19*	6th

* 13 points scored using the JS9.
