= 1978 Formula One season =

32nd season of FIA Formula One motor racing

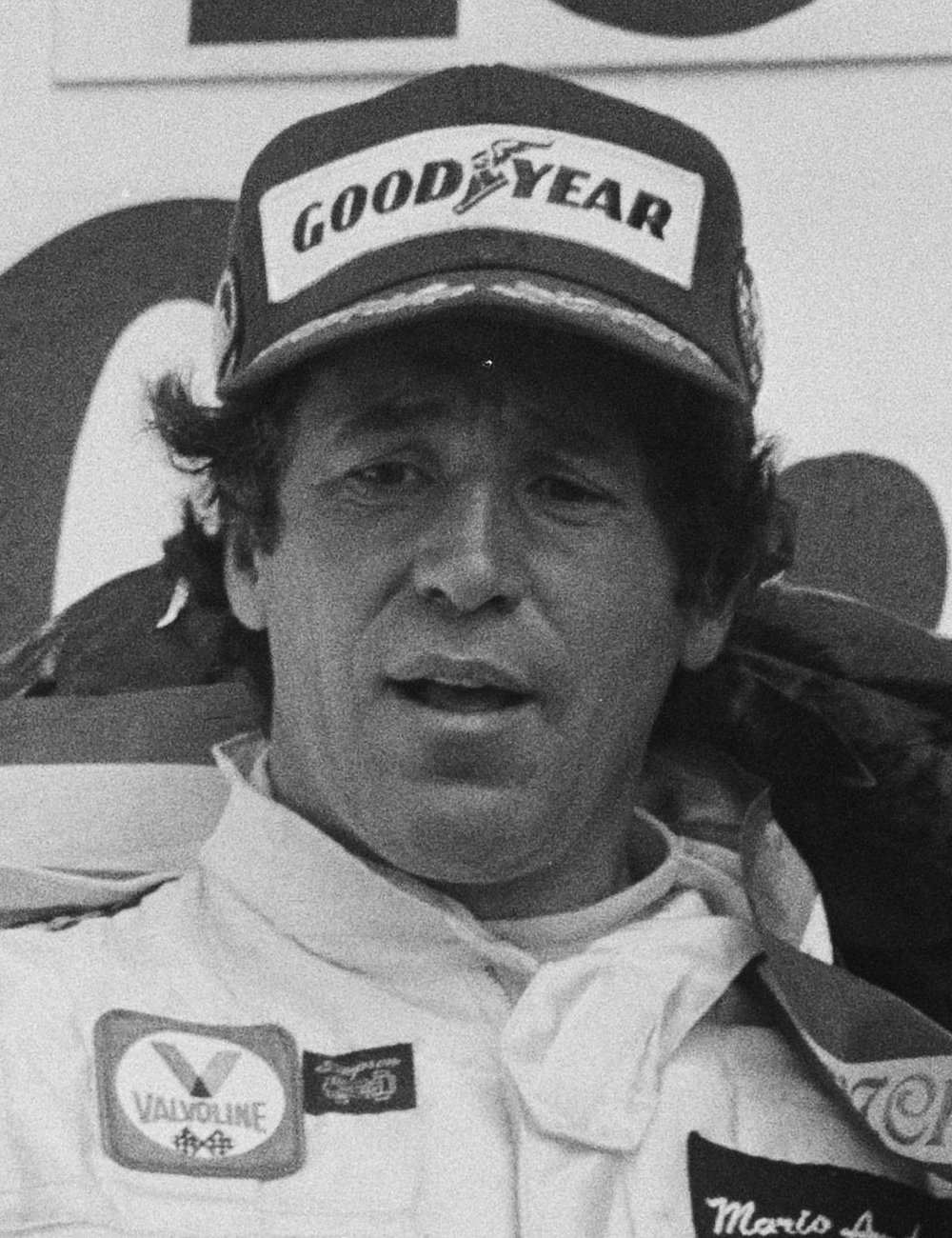
Mario Andretti won his first and only World Championship driving for Lotus-Ford.

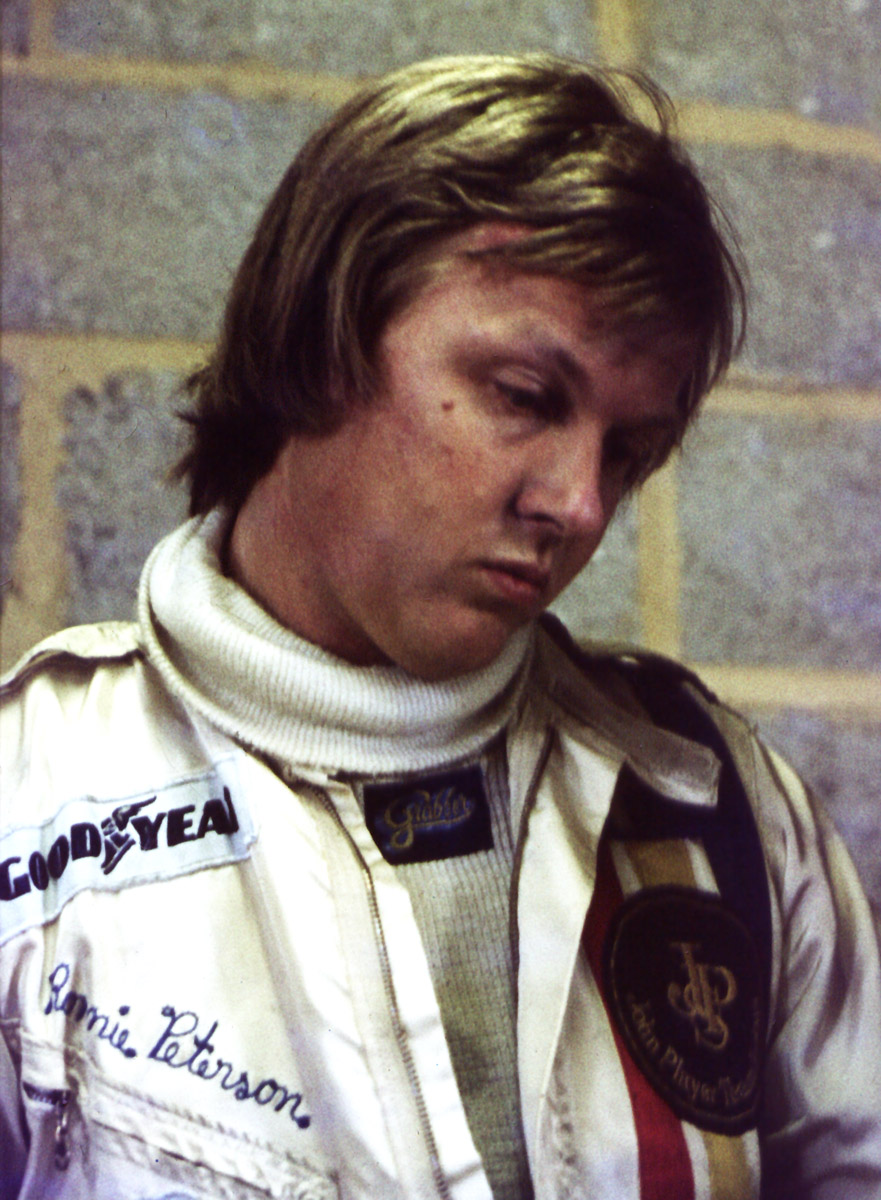
Andretti's teammate Ronnie Peterson (pictured in 1977) posthumously finished in second. He suffered a fatal crash at the Italian Grand Prix.

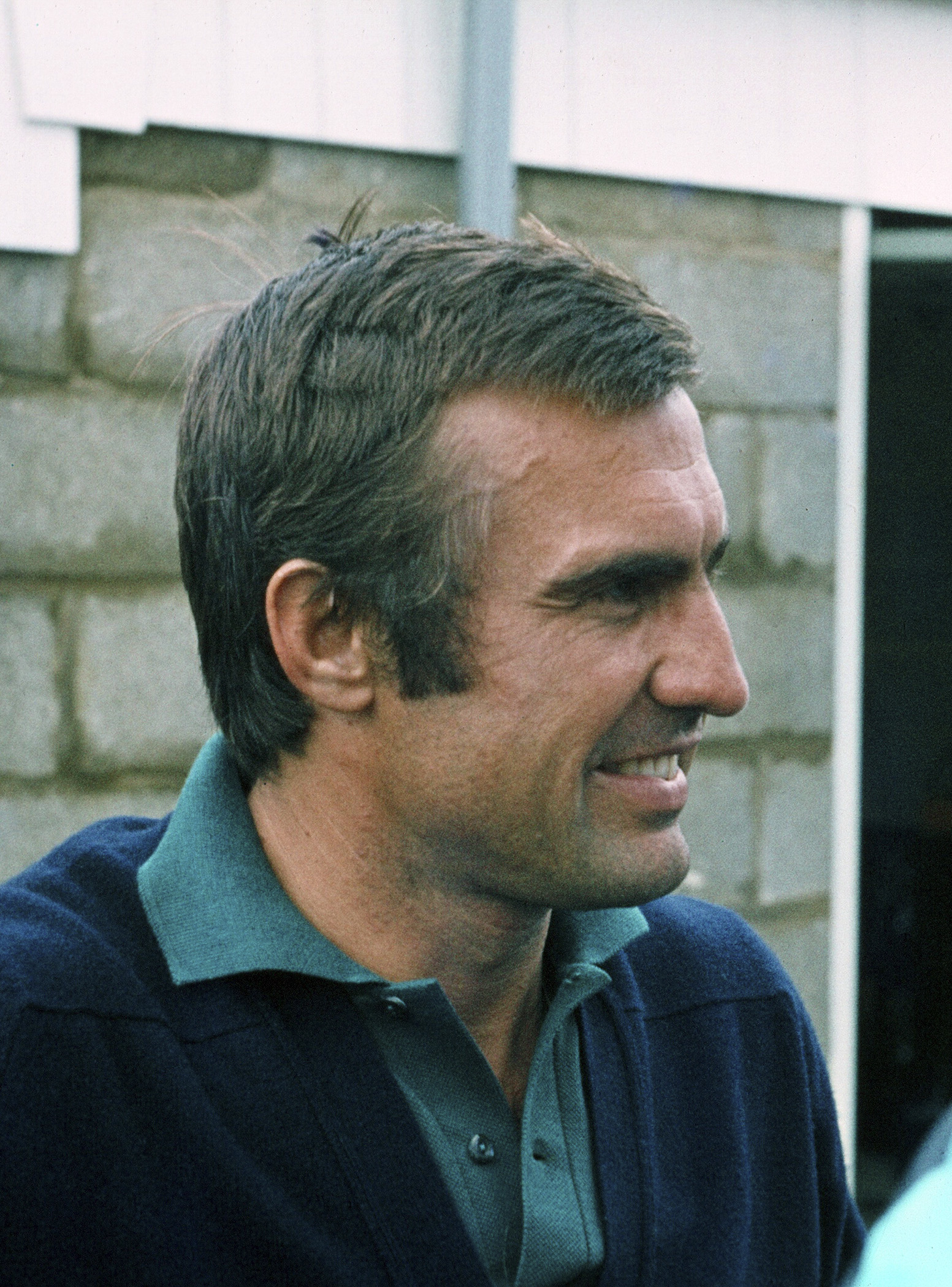
Carlos Reutemann (pictured in 1976) finished third, driving for Ferrari.

The 1978 Formula One season was the 32nd season of FIA Formula One motor racing. It featured the 1978 World Championship of F1 Drivers and the International Cup for F1 Constructors, contested concurrently over a sixteen race series which commenced on 15 January and ended on 8 October. The season also included the non-championship BRDC International Trophy.

Mario Andretti won the Drivers' World Championship, driving for JPS-Lotus. He remains the last American driver to win the World Championship. His victory at the Dutch Grand Prix is also the last for an American driver. Ronnie Peterson was awarded second place in the Drivers' standings posthumously, having died from medical complications after an accident at Monza during the Italian Grand Prix. Lotus won the International Cup for F1 Constructors, for the last time.

Championship defendants Niki Lauda and Ferrari had parted ways late in 1977, and both parties struggled to repeat the successes they had enjoyed the previous seasons. Carlos Reutemann finished third in the championship in the lead Ferrari, while Lauda finished fourth with Brabham. Apart from Peterson's death, the year saw another tragedy when Peterson's Swedish compatriot Gunnar Nilsson died from cancer, having been forced to cut his career short after the previous season because of the disease.

== Drivers and constructors ==
The following drivers and constructors contested the 1978 World Championship of F1 Drivers and the International Cup for F1 Constructors.

Entrant	Constructor	Chassis	Engine	Tyres	No	Driver	Rounds
(United Kingdom) Parmalat Racing	Brabham-Alfa Romeo	BT45C; BT46; BT46B; BT46C	Alfa Romeo 115-12 3.0 F12	G	1	(Austria) Niki Lauda	All
(United Kingdom) Parmalat Racing	Brabham-Alfa Romeo	BT45C; BT46; BT46B; BT46C	Alfa Romeo 115-12 3.0 F12	G	2	(United Kingdom) John Watson	All
(United Kingdom) Parmalat Racing	Brabham-Alfa Romeo	BT45C; BT46; BT46B; BT46C	Alfa Romeo 115-12 3.0 F12	G	66	(Brazil) Nelson Piquet	16
(United Kingdom) First National City Travelers Checks Elf Team Tyrrell	Tyrrell-Ford	008	Ford Cosworth DFV 3.0 V8	G	3	(France) Didier Pironi	All
(United Kingdom) First National City Travelers Checks Elf Team Tyrrell	Tyrrell-Ford	008	Ford Cosworth DFV 3.0 V8	G	4	(France) Patrick Depailler	All
(United Kingdom) John Player Team Lotus	Lotus-Ford	78; 79	Ford Cosworth DFV 3.0 V8	G	5	(United States) Mario Andretti	All
(United Kingdom) John Player Team Lotus	Lotus-Ford	78; 79	Ford Cosworth DFV 3.0 V8	G	6	(Sweden) Ronnie Peterson	1–14
(United Kingdom) John Player Team Lotus	Lotus-Ford	78; 79	Ford Cosworth DFV 3.0 V8	G	55	(France) Jean-Pierre Jarier (Note: Jean-Pierre Jarier raced with #55 when the team retired #6.)	15–16
(United Kingdom) Marlboro Team McLaren (United Kingdom) Löwenbräu Team McLaren	McLaren-Ford	M26	Ford Cosworth DFV 3.0 V8	G	7	(United Kingdom) James Hunt	All
(United Kingdom) Marlboro Team McLaren (United Kingdom) Löwenbräu Team McLaren	McLaren-Ford	M26	Ford Cosworth DFV 3.0 V8	G	8	(France) Patrick Tambay	1–5, 7–16
(United Kingdom) Marlboro Team McLaren (United Kingdom) Löwenbräu Team McLaren	McLaren-Ford	M26	Ford Cosworth DFV 3.0 V8	G	33	(Italy) Bruno Giacomelli	6, 9–10, 13–14
(West Germany) ATS Racing Team (West Germany) F&S Properties ATS Racing Team	ATS-Ford	HS1; D1	Ford Cosworth DFV 3.0 V8	G	9	(West Germany) Jochen Mass	1–13
(West Germany) ATS Racing Team (West Germany) F&S Properties ATS Racing Team	ATS-Ford	HS1; D1	Ford Cosworth DFV 3.0 V8	G	9	(Netherlands) Michael Bleekemolen	14–16
(West Germany) ATS Racing Team (West Germany) F&S Properties ATS Racing Team	ATS-Ford	HS1; D1	Ford Cosworth DFV 3.0 V8	G	10	(France) Jean-Pierre Jarier	1–5, 11
(West Germany) ATS Racing Team (West Germany) F&S Properties ATS Racing Team	ATS-Ford	HS1; D1	Ford Cosworth DFV 3.0 V8	G	10	(Italy) Alberto Colombo	6–7
(West Germany) ATS Racing Team (West Germany) F&S Properties ATS Racing Team	ATS-Ford	HS1; D1	Ford Cosworth DFV 3.0 V8	G	10	(Finland) Keke Rosberg	8–10, 15–16
(West Germany) ATS Racing Team (West Germany) F&S Properties ATS Racing Team	ATS-Ford	HS1; D1	Ford Cosworth DFV 3.0 V8	G	10	(Austria) Hans Binder	12
(West Germany) ATS Racing Team (West Germany) F&S Properties ATS Racing Team	ATS-Ford	HS1; D1	Ford Cosworth DFV 3.0 V8	G	10	(Netherlands) Michael Bleekemolen	13
(West Germany) ATS Racing Team (West Germany) F&S Properties ATS Racing Team	ATS-Ford	HS1; D1	Ford Cosworth DFV 3.0 V8	G	10	(Austria) Harald Ertl	14
(Italy) SEFAC Ferrari	Ferrari	312T2; 312T3	Ferrari 015 3.0 F12	MI	11	(Argentina) Carlos Reutemann	All
(Italy) SEFAC Ferrari	Ferrari	312T2; 312T3	Ferrari 015 3.0 F12	MI	12	(Canada) Gilles Villeneuve	All
(Brazil) Fittipaldi Automotive	Fittipaldi-Ford	F5A	Ford Cosworth DFV 3.0 V8	G	14	(Brazil) Emerson Fittipaldi	All
(France) Équipe Renault Elf	Renault Elf	RS01	Renault-Gordini EF1 1.5 V6 t	MI	15	(France) Jean-Pierre Jabouille	3–16
(United Kingdom) Villiger Shadow	Shadow-Ford	DN8; DN9	Ford Cosworth DFV 3.0 V8	G	16	(West Germany) Hans-Joachim Stuck	All
(United Kingdom) Villiger Shadow	Shadow-Ford	DN8; DN9	Ford Cosworth DFV 3.0 V8	G	17	(Switzerland) Clay Regazzoni	All
(United Kingdom) Durex Team Surtees (United Kingdom) Beta Team Surtees	Surtees-Ford	TS19; TS20	Ford Cosworth DFV 3.0 V8	G	18	(United Kingdom) Rupert Keegan	1–13
(United Kingdom) Durex Team Surtees (United Kingdom) Beta Team Surtees	Surtees-Ford	TS19; TS20	Ford Cosworth DFV 3.0 V8	G	18	(Italy) "Gimax"	14
(United Kingdom) Durex Team Surtees (United Kingdom) Beta Team Surtees	Surtees-Ford	TS19; TS20	Ford Cosworth DFV 3.0 V8	G	18	(France) René Arnoux	15–16
(United Kingdom) Durex Team Surtees (United Kingdom) Beta Team Surtees	Surtees-Ford	TS19; TS20	Ford Cosworth DFV 3.0 V8	G	19	(Italy) Vittorio Brambilla	1–14
(United Kingdom) Durex Team Surtees (United Kingdom) Beta Team Surtees	Surtees-Ford	TS19; TS20	Ford Cosworth DFV 3.0 V8	G	19	(Italy) Beppe Gabbiani	15–16
(Canada) Walter Wolf Racing	Wolf-Ford	WR1; WR3; WR5; WR6	Ford Cosworth DFV 3.0 V8	G	20	(South Africa) Jody Scheckter	All
(Canada) Walter Wolf Racing	Wolf-Ford	WR1; WR3; WR5; WR6	Ford Cosworth DFV 3.0 V8	G	21	(United States) Bobby Rahal	15–16
(United Kingdom) Team Tissot Ensign	Ensign-Ford	N177	Ford Cosworth DFV 3.0 V8	G	22	(United States) Danny Ongais	1–2
(United Kingdom) Team Tissot Ensign	Ensign-Ford	N177	Ford Cosworth DFV 3.0 V8	G	22	(Italy) Lamberto Leoni	3–4
(United Kingdom) Team Tissot Ensign	Ensign-Ford	N177	Ford Cosworth DFV 3.0 V8	G	22	(Belgium) Jacky Ickx	5–8
(United Kingdom) Team Tissot Ensign	Ensign-Ford	N177	Ford Cosworth DFV 3.0 V8	G	22	(Republic of Ireland) Derek Daly	9–10, 12–16
(United Kingdom) Team Tissot Ensign	Ensign-Ford	N177	Ford Cosworth DFV 3.0 V8	G	22	(Brazil) Nelson Piquet	11
(United Kingdom) Team Tissot Ensign	Ensign-Ford	N177	Ford Cosworth DFV 3.0 V8	G	23	(Italy) Lamberto Leoni	1–2
(United Kingdom) Team Tissot Ensign	Ensign-Ford	N177	Ford Cosworth DFV 3.0 V8	G	23	(Belgium) Bernard de Dryver	6
(United Kingdom) Team Tissot Ensign	Ensign-Ford	N177	Ford Cosworth DFV 3.0 V8	G	23	(United States) Brett Lunger	15
(West Germany) Sachs Racing	Ensign-Ford	N177	Ford Cosworth DFV 3.0 V8	G	23	(Austria) Harald Ertl	11–14
(United Kingdom) Mario Deliotti Racing	Ensign-Ford	N175	Ford Cosworth DFV 3.0 V8	G	23	(United Kingdom) Geoff Lees	10
(United Kingdom) Olympus Cameras with Hesketh Racing	Hesketh-Ford	308E	Ford Cosworth DFV 3.0 V8	G	24	(United Kingdom) Divina Galica	1–2
(United Kingdom) Olympus Cameras with Hesketh Racing	Hesketh-Ford	308E	Ford Cosworth DFV 3.0 V8	G	24	(United States) Eddie Cheever	3
(United Kingdom) Olympus Cameras with Hesketh Racing	Hesketh-Ford	308E	Ford Cosworth DFV 3.0 V8	G	24	(Republic of Ireland) Derek Daly	4–6
(Mexico) Team Rebaque	Lotus-Ford	78	Ford Cosworth DFV 3.0 V8	G	25	(Mexico) Héctor Rebaque	All
(France) Ligier Gitanes	Ligier-Matra	JS7; JS7/9; JS9	Matra MS76 3.0 V12; Matra MS78 3.0 V12	G	26	(France) Jacques Laffite	All
(United Kingdom) Williams Grand Prix Engineering	Williams-Ford	FW06	Ford Cosworth DFV 3.0 V8	G	27	(Australia) Alan Jones	All
(Spain) Centro Asegurador F1	McLaren-Ford	M25/M23 (Note: De Villota originally entered a McLaren M25 in the Spanish Grand Prix, but reverted to the M23 after the M25 got damaged in a practice crash)	Ford Cosworth DFV 3.0 V8	G	28	(Spain) Emilio de Villota	7
(Belgium) Patrick Nève	March-Ford	781S	Ford Cosworth DFV 3.0 V8	G	29	(Belgium) Patrick Nève	6
(United Kingdom) BS Fabrications (United Kingdom) Liggett Group with BS Fabrications	McLaren-Ford	M23; M26	Ford Cosworth DFV 3.0 V8	G	29	(Brazil) Nelson Piquet	12–14
(United Kingdom) BS Fabrications (United Kingdom) Liggett Group with BS Fabrications	McLaren-Ford	M23; M26	Ford Cosworth DFV 3.0 V8	G	30	(United States) Brett Lunger	1–14
(France) Automobiles Martini	Martini-Ford	MK23	Ford Cosworth DFV 3.0 V8	G	31	(France) René Arnoux	3, 5–6, 9–13
Theodore Racing Hong Kong	Theodore-Ford	TR1	Ford Cosworth DFV 3.0 V8	G	32	(United States) Eddie Cheever	1–2
Theodore Racing Hong Kong	Theodore-Ford	TR1	Ford Cosworth DFV 3.0 V8	G	32	(Finland) Keke Rosberg	3–7
Theodore Racing Hong Kong	Wolf-Ford	WR3; WR4	Ford Cosworth DFV 3.0 V8	G	32	(Finland) Keke Rosberg	11–14
(Italy) Team Merzario	Merzario-Ford	A1	Ford Cosworth DFV 3.0 V8	G	34	(Italy) Alberto Colombo	14
(Italy) Team Merzario	Merzario-Ford	A1	Ford Cosworth DFV 3.0 V8	G	37	(Italy) Arturo Merzario	All
(United Kingdom) Arrows Racing Team (United Kingdom) Warsteiner Arrows Racing Team	Arrows-Ford	FA1; A1	Ford Cosworth DFV 3.0 V8	G	35	(Italy) Riccardo Patrese	3–14, 16
(United Kingdom) Arrows Racing Team (United Kingdom) Warsteiner Arrows Racing Team	Arrows-Ford	FA1; A1	Ford Cosworth DFV 3.0 V8	G	36	(Italy) Riccardo Patrese	2
(United Kingdom) Arrows Racing Team (United Kingdom) Warsteiner Arrows Racing Team	Arrows-Ford	FA1; A1	Ford Cosworth DFV 3.0 V8	G	36	(West Germany) Rolf Stommelen	3–16
(United States) Interscope Racing	Shadow-Ford	DN9	Ford Cosworth DFV 3.0 V8	G	39	(United States) Danny Ongais	4, 13
(United Kingdom) Melchester Racing	McLaren-Ford	M23	Ford Cosworth DFV 3.0 V8	G	40	(United Kingdom) Tony Trimmer	10

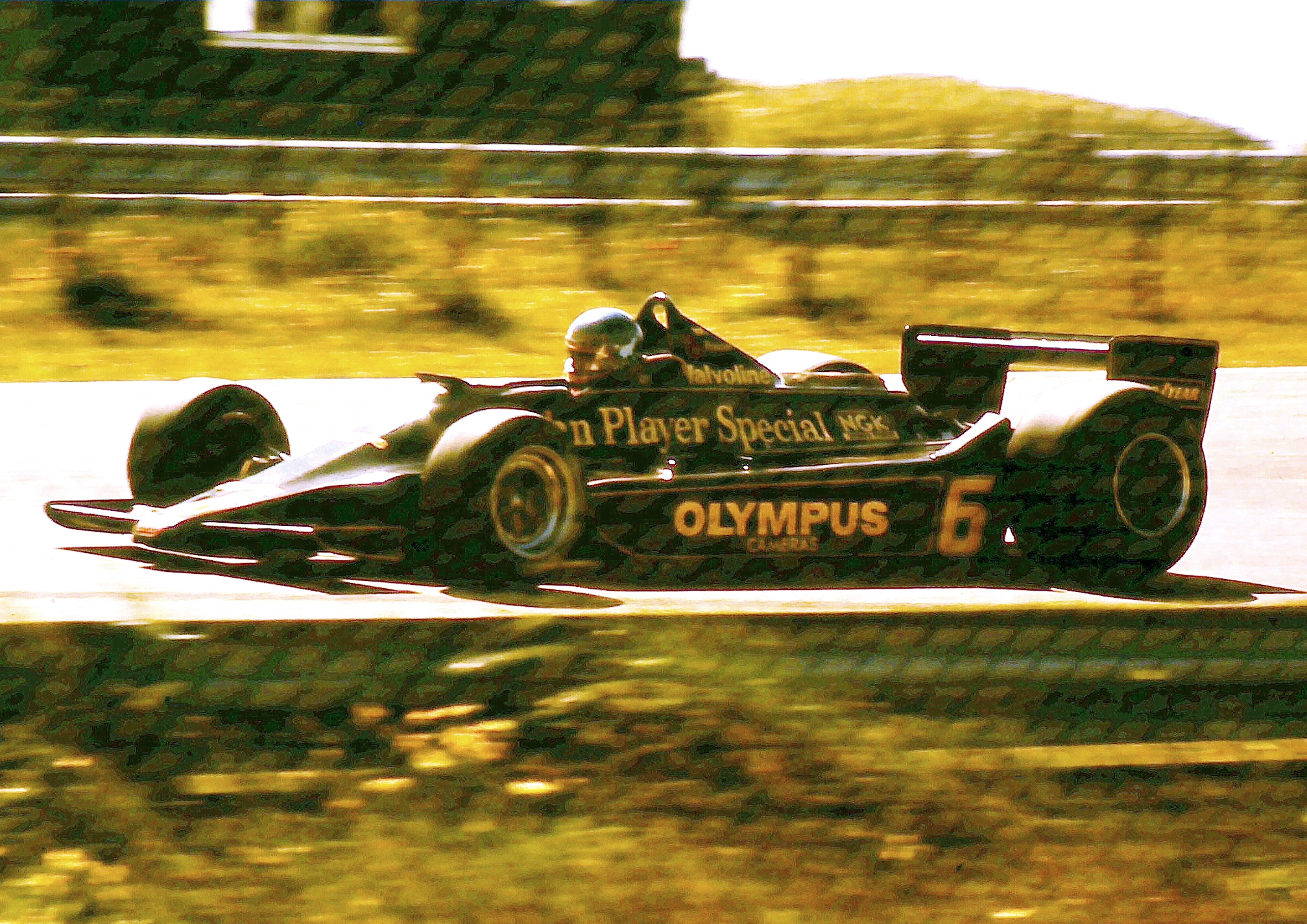
Ronnie Peterson moved to Lotus.

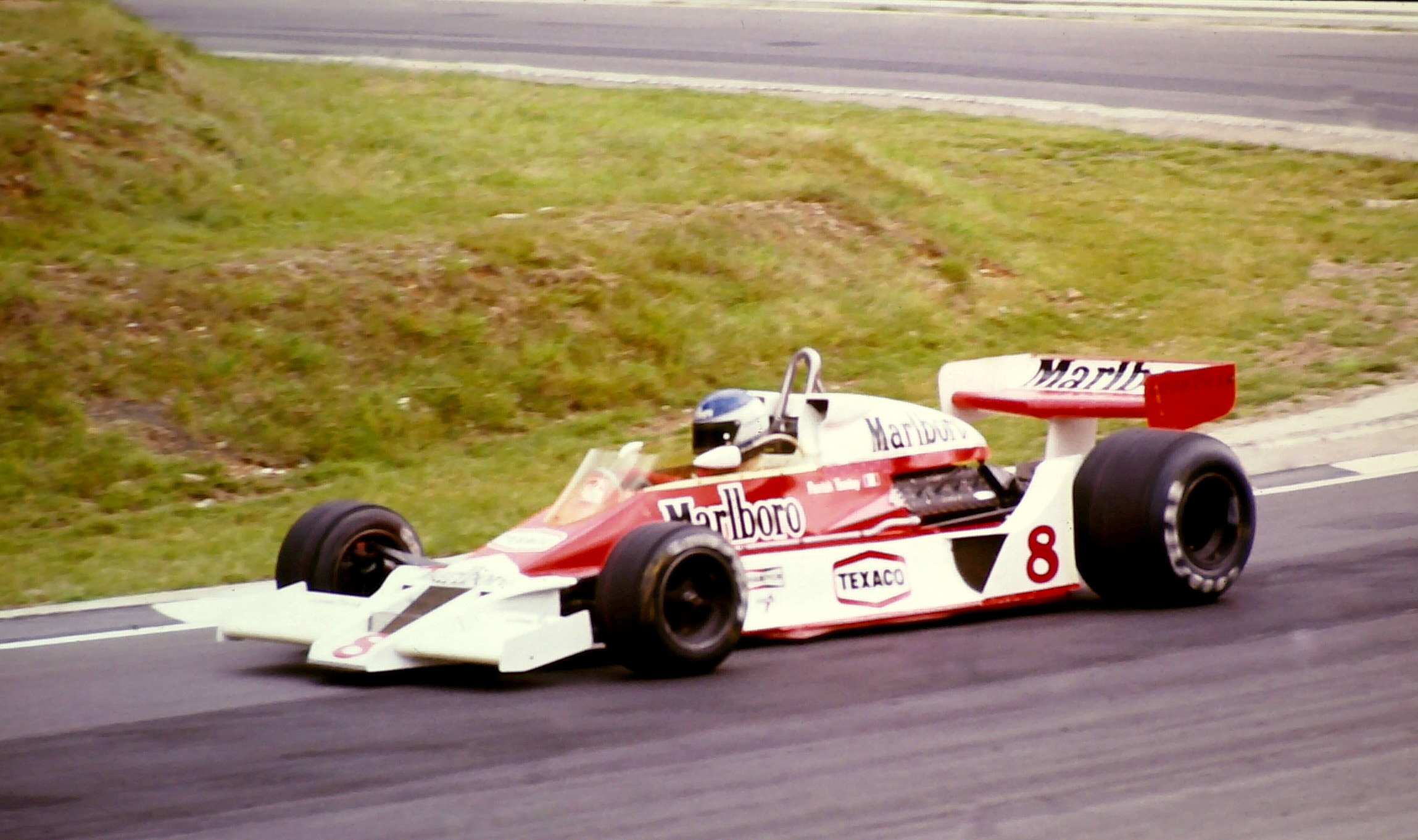
Patrick Tambay moved up to McLaren.

=== Team and driver changes ===
- Reigning champion Niki Lauda had parted with Ferrari before the end of the 1977 season. Gilles Villeneuve replaced him at his home race and stayed for the 1978 season.
- Lauda replaced Hans-Joachim Stuck at Brabham, who subsequently moved to Shadow. He would join Alan Jones, were it not for the Australian's new contract with Williams. Williams would enter their first self-made chassis for 1978.
- Clay Regazzoni moved to Shadow from Ensign, while his 1977 teammate Patrick Tambay was signed by McLaren. This left Ensign in a search for two new drivers and they found Danny Ongais from the folded Penske team and the inexperienced Lamberto Leoni. Ex-McLaren driver Jochen Mass found a seat at ATS, built on the remains of Penske and March.
- Ronnie Peterson made a surprising switch to Lotus, replacing fellow Swede Gunnar Nilsson. Peterson's seat at Tyrrell was filled by debutant Didier Pironi. Nilsson signed with newcomer Arrows, but was diagnosed with terminal testicular cancer and retired before the season started. Ex-Shadow driver Riccardo Patrese and veteran Rolf Stommelen eventually drove for Arrows.
- Three teams (besides Williams and Arrows mentioned above) debuted with their self-made chassis: Martini, Merzario and Theodore. BRM had folded.

==== Mid-season changes ====
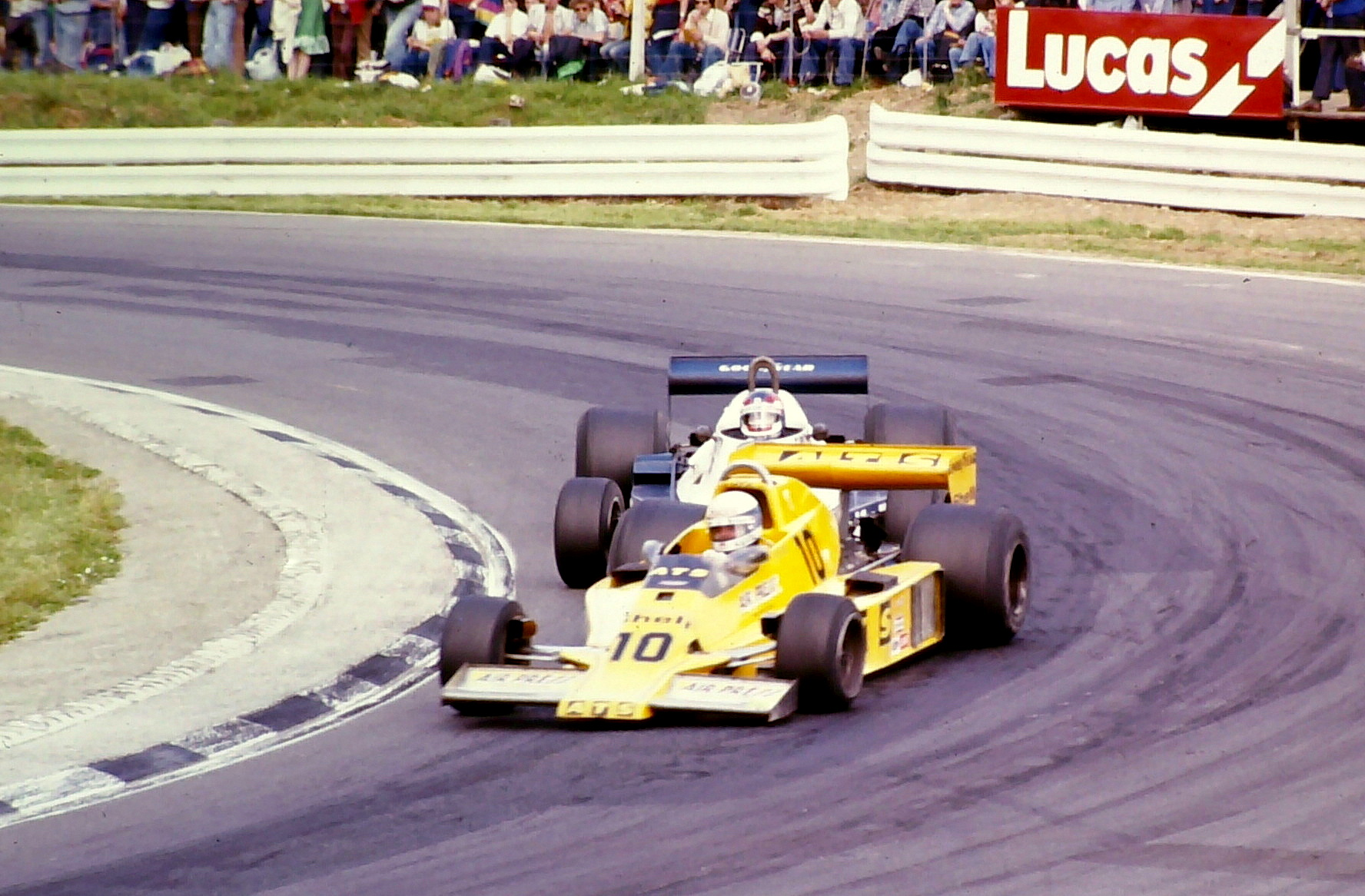
Future champion Keke Rosberg driving the ATS at the British Grand Prix.

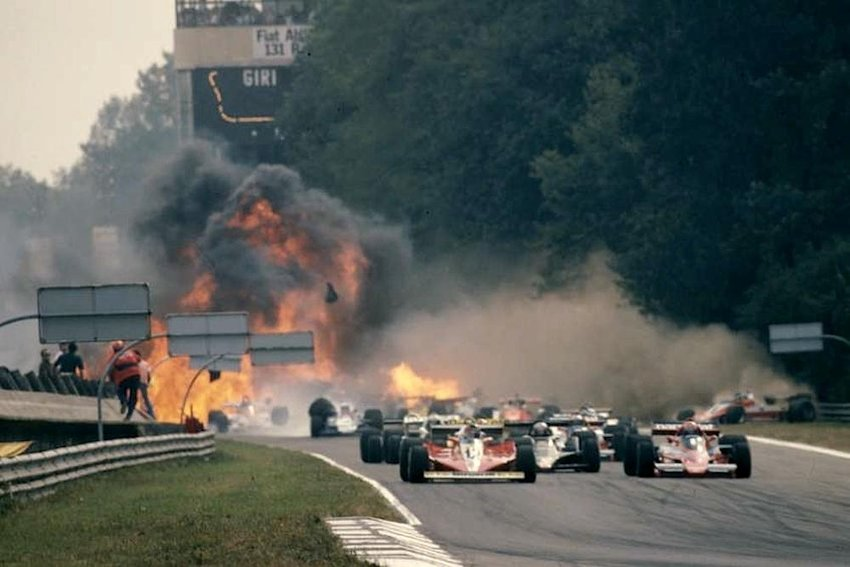
Ronnie Peterson lost his life in the start incident at the Italian Grand Prix.

- Eddie Cheever's debut with the Theodore team turned out to be preliminary and he returned to Formula Two. His seat was taken by future champion Keke Rosberg, until he moved to ATS. When Theodore retired their self-made chassis in favour of a private Wolf chassis, Rosberg returned, yet ended the season with ATS.
- Bruno Giacomelli drove a third McLaren car whenever his schedule allowed. He went to become the 1978 Formula Two champion.
- Hesketh Racing folded after six races.
- When the Martini team folded with three races to go, their driver René Arnoux found a new home at Surtees.
- At the start of the Italian Grand Prix, James Hunt tried to avoid Riccardo Patrese and collided with Ronnie Peterson. In the ensuing melee, eight other drivers crashed, Peterson's Lotus went hard into the barriers and caught fire. He was rescued from the wreck with minor burns but severe leg injuries. That night in hospital, he was diagnosed with fat embolism, and a subsequent kidney failure was fatal. In the crash, Vittorio Brambilla had been hit in the head by a tyre and sat unconscious in his car. He recovered to return to Formula 1 a full year later. Jean-Pierre Jarier took the seat at Lotus, Beppe Gabbiani fell in at Surtees.
- Nelson Piquet entered the last race of the season in a third Brabham car, before his full-season debut in 1979.

== Calendar ==
Round	Grand Prix	Circuit	Date
1	Argentine Grand Prix	(Argentina) Autodromo de Buenos Aires, Buenos Aires	15 January
2	Brazilian Grand Prix	(Brazil) Jacarepaguá, Rio de Janeiro	29 January
3	South African Grand Prix	(South Africa) Kyalami Grand Prix Circuit, Midrand	4 March
4	United States Grand Prix West	(United States) Long Beach Street Circuit, Long Beach	2 April
5	Monaco Grand Prix	Circuit de Monaco, Monte Carlo	7 May
6	Belgian Grand Prix	(Belgium) Circuit Zolder, Heusden-Zolder	21 May
7	Spanish Grand Prix	(Spain) Circuito Permanente Del Jarama, Madrid	4 June
8	Swedish Grand Prix	(Sweden) Scandinavian Raceway, Anderstorp	17 June
9	French Grand Prix	(France) Circuit Paul Ricard, Le Castellet	2 July
10	British Grand Prix	(United Kingdom) Brands Hatch, Kent	16 July
11	German Grand Prix	(West Germany) Hockenheimring, Hockenheim	30 July
12	Austrian Grand Prix	(Austria) Österreichring, Spielberg	13 August
13	Dutch Grand Prix	(Netherlands) Circuit Park Zandvoort, Zandvoort	27 August
14	Italian Grand Prix	(Italy) Autodromo Nazionale di Monza, Monza	10 September
15	United States Grand Prix	(United States) Watkins Glen Grand Prix Course, New York	1 October
16	Canadian Grand Prix	(Canada) Île Notre-Dame Circuit, Montréal	8 October

=== Calendar changes ===
- The Brazilian Grand Prix was moved from Autodromo de Interlagos in São Paulo to Jacarepaguá in Rio de Janeiro for 1978.
- The Spanish Grand Prix was moved from early May to early June, with the slots of the Monaco and Belgian rounds being moved up
- The French Grand Prix was moved from Dijon-Prenois to Circuit Paul Ricard, in keeping with the event-sharing arrangement between the two circuits. Likewise, the British Grand Prix was moved from Silverstone to Brands Hatch.
- The Canadian Grand Prix was moved from Mosport Park to the Île Notre-Dame Circuit because of track safety and organization problems with the hilly and scenic Mosport Park track.
- The Japanese Grand Prix was originally scheduled on 16 April at the Suzuka Circuit after Fuji's contract was torn up, but it was cancelled for safety and financial reasons. The race would take place during the 1987 season

== Season report ==
The 1978 World Championship of F1 Drivers and the International Cup for F1 Constructors were contested concurrently over a sixteen-race series.

=== Race 1: Argentina ===
The 1978 season started at the varied Parque Almirante Brown circuit in Buenos Aires, Argentina, where Mario Andretti took pole in his Lotus, with home favourite Carlos Reutemann's Ferrari joining him on the front row and Ronnie Peterson in the other Lotus third on the grid. The start was uneventful, with Andretti and Reutemann easily keeping first and second, with John Watson in the Brabham taking third from Peterson. Watson took second from Reutemann on the seventh lap, but Andretti was uncatchable. Reutemann ran third for a while but then began to drop down the order due to tire problems, so reigning world champion Niki Lauda took third in his Brabham, which became second with ten laps left when Watson's engine blew up. Andretti motored on to a crushing victory, with Lauda second and Patrick Depailler's Tyrrell taking the final spot on the podium. This had been an unusual Argentine Grand Prix- although the summer weather had been usually hot (although not as hot as the previous year), the attrition rate hadn't been as high, nor had the polesitter retired.

=== Race 2: Brazil ===
Brazil was the country where the drivers traveled for the second round of the season. Formula One made its first visit to the new Jacarepagua Autodrome in Rio de Janeiro, after six years at the very bumpy and demanding Interlagos circuit in São Paulo – the Jacarepagua circuit was to be visited by Formula One for the rest of the next decade. The typically extreme weather during January in Rio meant that this race was run in oppressively hot and humid conditions. Peterson took pole with James Hunt driving for McLaren beating Andretti to second. At the start, Reutemann beat the trio into the first corner, with Hunt and Andretti following, as Peterson got a bad start. Hunt ran second until he had to pit for tyres, as a result, Andretti took the place until late in the race when he suffered gearbox issues, which handed second to Fittipaldi and third to Lauda. Hunt eventually spun out of the race after being caught out by the hot and humid conditions on lap 26, as did Tambay on lap 35 and Villeneuve one lap later. Reutemann was never headed at the front and went to win comfortably, with double world champion Emerson Fittipaldi in his brother's team finishing second, and Lauda third, with both overhauling an ailing Andretti towards the end, who eventually finished 4th ahead of Regazzoni and Pironi who rounded out the top 6.

=== Race 3: South Africa ===
After a long break, the season resumed at the Kyalami circuit in South Africa for the 300th World Championship Grand Prix, where defending champion Lauda took his first pole for Brabham with Andretti alongside and Hunt next. Andretti took the lead at the start, and set about building a gap, whereas Lauda dropped behind Jody Scheckter's Wolf. Young Italian Riccardo Patrese was on a charge in the Arrows, passing Lauda for third after 20 laps. As the race continued, both Andretti and Scheckter began to suffer from tyre issues and were passed by Patrese. Depailler was up to second ahead of Lauda, but the latter's engine failed, handing third to Andretti. Patrese, however, seemed to have the race in his pocket until his engine failed, and Depailler took the lead, but his Tyrrell began to trail smoke. Andretti was up to second, but he had to pit for fuel, and thus his teammate Peterson took the place before catching and passing Depailler on the last lap to win after some wheel-banging. Watson completed the podium.

=== Race 4: United States West ===
The next race was in the famous Long Beach circuit near Los Angeles in the American state of California. The Ferraris dominated qualifying, with Reutemann taking pole ahead of teammate Gilles Villeneuve, with defending champion Lauda and home hero Andretti on the second row. When the race started, Watson in fifth late-braked all into turn one, though he ran wide and Villeneuve took the lead, whereas Reutemann dropped down to fourth behind Lauda. The Ferraris, with the two Brabhams in between, ran together until Watson's engine failed. Alan Jones's Williams was up to fourth and closed in on the now lead trio, which became a duo when Lauda went out with an electrical failure. Villeneuve and Reutemann ran 1–2, with Jones putting both under pressure before Villeneuve also retired after colliding with a backmarker. Jones suffered from fuel pressure problems and began to drop back, handing second to Andretti, to the fans' delight. The rest of the race passed without incident, and with all challengers out of contention, Reutemann won comfortably ahead of Andretti and Depailler.

=== Race 5: Monaco ===
Round Five took place in Monaco after an extended gap once the Japanese Grand Prix at the Suzuka circuit was cancelled. Once again, Reutemann started on pole with the Brabham duo of Watson and Lauda second and third. Watson had a good start and led into the first corner, whereas Reutemann collided with Hunt and had to pit for repairs, which left Depailler and Lauda second and third. For the first half of the race, the top three remained the same until Watson had an off allowing Depailler and Lauda through, but the latter then suffered a puncture and had to pit for tyres before charging back up and retaking second from Watson towards the end of the race. At the front, Depailler took his first career victory, with Lauda second and Scheckter third after Watson made another mistake in the final laps.

=== Race 6: Belgium ===
The main news before the Belgian GP at Zolder was that the new Lotus 79 was ready to race, and immediately Andretti showed its pace by taking pole comfortably from Reutemann and Lauda. He converted it to a first-corner lead, whereas Reutemann had a bad start and got swamped by the field, causing a chain reaction in which Lauda was hit by Scheckter and had to retire. This left Villeneuve second and Peterson third, but neither could keep pace with Andretti, who was able to drive away.

The first 40 laps went without incident until Villeneuve suffered a puncture and had to pit, which dropped him back down to fifth. A few laps later, Peterson also pitted for new tyres leaving the charging Reutemann second ahead of Jacques Laffite's Ligier. Peterson, on the new tyres, was much quicker and could pass them both in the closing stages, and Laffite attempted to pass Reutemann on the last lap, but they collided, and Laffite was out. Andretti cruised to an untroubled victory, with Peterson making it a Lotus 1–2 and Reutemann completing the podium.

=== Race 7: Spain ===
The next race was at the tight, twisty Jarama circuit near Madrid in Spain. Once again, the new Lotus 79 demonstrated its speed, with Andretti on pole again with Peterson alongside, and Reutemann had to settle for the second row. It was Hunt who got a great start and led into the first corner from Andretti and Reutemann, with Peterson dropping back to ninth. Hunt led for seven laps before Andretti passed him and pulled away. Reutemann ran third until he had to pit for tyres, so Watson inherited third until Laffite passed him, but soon the recovering Peterson passed both of them. Hunt now suffered from tyre problems, and he also began to drop back, and so Peterson was able to take second and Laffite third. That was how it ended: Andretti won over Peterson in another Lotus 1–2, and Laffite got the final spot on the podium.

=== Race 8: Sweden ===
Before the Swedish GP at the isolated Anderstorp circuit, the Brabham team had developed a new "fan car" much to the anger of the other teams, but the FIA allowed it to race. However, it did not stop Andretti from continuing his pole run, but it got Watson to qualify second and Lauda third- while running on full fuel tanks. When the race started, Andretti led into the first corner, with Lauda getting second from his teammate. Riccardo Patrese got up to third in his Arrows until home driver Peterson passed him, but by then, Andretti and Lauda had escaped. Peterson struggled with a slow puncture, whereas Andretti and Lauda battled, with Andretti making a mistake just after mid-distance, allowing Lauda to take the lead. Lauda went on to win the race, his first for Brabham after Andretti's challenge ended due to an engine failure, which left Patrese and Peterson to take second and third. This was the last Swedish Grand Prix to date-with the deaths of Ronnie Peterson and Gunnar Nilsson, Swedish interest faded in Formula One, and there was no money for the race to be held.

=== Race 9: France ===
Brabham was forced to revert to their previous car, but it did not deter them, with Watson on pole and Lauda starting third behind Andretti. At the start, Watson led into the first corner, with Andretti following and Patrick Tambay putting his McLaren in third, but that order did not remain for long as Andretti took the lead from Watson on the first lap. Lauda and Peterson were also on the move as they passed Watson and Tambay to jump into second and third, but Lauda suffered another engine failure. This left the two Lotus cars running 1–2, and they finished like that, with Andretti taking his third win in four races, and the podium was completed by Hunt, who passed Watson mid-race.

=== Race 10: Great Britain ===
The field went to Britain for the next round, and this time it was Peterson who beat Andretti to pole, as Lotus took the front row, with Scheckter next up on the second row. Andretti took the lead at the start from Peterson, and the two Lotus cars quickly pulled out a gap until Peterson retired with an engine failure. Andretti had a big lead to Scheckter and continued to extend it until he had to pit with a puncture, and he eventually retired when his engine also failed. Scheckter inherited the lead, but Lauda put him under pressure and took the lead before Scheckter went out with gearbox problems. This put Reutemann up to second, closing down and passing Lauda in the late stages of the race to win. Lauda had to settle for second, and his teammate Watson took a podium in his home race.

=== Race 11: West Germany ===
The West German race was next on the calendar, and there were no surprises in qualifying, with Andretti on pole and Peterson alongside him, with Lauda third. At the start, Peterson got off better and took the lead from Andretti, but he held it for only four laps before Andretti retook it. Lauda ran third in the early stages, but Alan Jones passed him, and the duo battled until Lauda's engine failed yet again. The two Lotus cars were cruising at the front, and Jones ran third comfortably until he retired with a fuel vaporization problem. Lotus's hopes of a 1–2 ended when Peterson's gearbox failed, but Andretti was unaffected by that and cruised to his fifth win of the season, with Scheckter second and Laffite third.

=== Race 12: Austria ===
The crowds for the Austrian GP were full of Lauda fans; however, for them, Lauda qualified only 12th as the Lotus cars again took the front row, with Peterson on pole. The surprise in qualifying was Jean-Pierre Jabouille, who qualified his turbocharged Renault third. The start saw Peterson lead into the first corner, with Reutemann snatching second from Andretti. Andretti tried to get the place back later in the lap, but the two collided, and Andretti retired after his car spun into the barriers while Reutemann lost a couple of places to Patrick Depailler and Scheckter. On the fourth lap, a heavy rainshower hit the track, and Reutemann spun off and was beached, but the marshals push-started his car as it was in a dangerous position, while Scheckter crashed out, and the race was stopped.

The race restarted after the rain relented, and once again, Peterson led, followed by Depailler and Lauda. As the track began to dry, Peterson started to pull away, and behind, Reutemann was on a charge and passed Lauda for third. Still, he was black-flagged for receiving outside assistance, and Lauda crashed out soon after, leaving Gilles Villeneuve third. The drivers changed to slicks, but the top 3 remained the same until the end; Peterson won ahead of Depailler, with Villeneuve taking his first-ever podium.

=== Race 13: The Netherlands ===
The drivers went to the Netherlands for the next race, qualifying as expected, Andretti taking pole with Peterson alongside in the all-Lotus front row and Lauda heading the second row. At the start, Andretti led with Peterson following, whereas Jacques Laffite challenged Lauda. The Lotus cars quickly built up a good gap, while Laffite challenged Lauda early on but then began to drop down the order with tyre issues. The race was relatively uneventful, and Andretti went to take victory, with Peterson completing another Lotus 1–2, leaving Lauda to take third.

=== Race 14: Italy ===
The Italian race was host to round fourteen, and as usual, Andretti took pole with Gilles Villeneuve pleasing the Ferrari fans by qualifying second, ahead of Jabouille's turbocharged Renault. When the race started, Andretti and Villeneuve got away comfortably, with Lauda and Jabouille following, but the rest of the field was bunched up.

Riccardo Patrese's Arrows overtook many of the cars on the right-hand side of the circuit next to the pitlane since he got a rolling start when the starter Gianni Restelli started the race prematurely. He rejoined the other cars just in front of the blocked entrance to the old Monza banking, and James Hunt got so surprised that he veered left and hit Peterson's Lotus 78 with his left front wheel. Peterson spun right and rammed the right Armco barrier hard, head-on; the front end of his Lotus 78 was crushed during the impact. Seven other drivers were collected: Carlos Reutemann, Hans Joachim Stuck, Patrick Depailler, Didier Pironi, Vittorio Brambilla, and Clay Regazzoni. Peterson's car broke in two on impact with the barriers and caught fire, and Vittorio Brambilla, who was in the Surtees, was hit on the head by a flying wheel. Peterson and Brambilla were taken to hospital, the former with 27 fractures in his legs and feet, and there was a concern for the latter who was unconscious after being hit by the wheel. The rest of the drivers were uninjured, and most of them were able to take the restart.

The race restarted almost four hours after the original start. Again there was confusion as the front-row starters Andretti and Villeneuve went too early, but the rest of the field did not follow, and both Andretti and Villeneuve were handed one-minute penalties as a result. On the track, Villeneuve led ahead of Andretti and Jabouille until Jabouille retired, handing third place on the track to Lauda. His teammate Watson battled with Reutemann and Laffite and eventually pulled away. The battle on the track was between Villeneuve and Andretti, with the Lotus driver passing Villeneuve with five laps left. Andretti crossed the line first, with Villeneuve close behind, but when their one-minute penalties were added, Lauda emerged the victor ahead of Watson and Reutemann.

In a hospital, Peterson had a clot forming in his bloodstream after an operation on his legs, slipped into a coma overnight, and died the following day. This made Andretti the world champion, although he did not celebrate it, and mourned for Peterson along with his fellow drivers. Brambilla was able to recover from his injuries.

=== Race 15: United States ===
The season's penultimate round was at Watkins Glen in the United States, and Lotus had hired Jean-Pierre Jarier to replace Peterson. Patrese could not race because the Grand Prix Drivers Association had deemed him responsible for the accident, ultimately killing Peterson.

New World Champion, and home hero, Andretti was shaken up more than most drivers due to Peterson's death, but it did not stop him from romping to pole ahead of Reutemann, with Alan Jones's Williams heading the second row. Andretti kept the lead at the start, with Reutemann and Villeneuve following ahead of Jones. Andretti suffered from an ill-handling car that had brake troubles and was soon passed by Reutemann, Villeneuve, and later Jones. Reutemann and Villeneuve ran 1–2 for Ferrari until Villeneuve's engine blew up. This left Jones second and Andretti third, but Andretti's engine blew up, handing third to Lauda until he also suffered the same fate, thus leaving Scheckter third before a charging Jarier passed him. However, Jarier ran out of fuel with four laps left, giving the place back to Scheckter. Reutemann took a comfortable win from Jones, with Scheckter completing the podium.

=== Race 16: Canada ===
The season finished in Canada, coming to the new île Notre-Dame circuit in Montreal; the Formula One circus left the previous Canadian GP location of Mosport Park due to safety issues with the Toronto circuit. In qualifying, Jarier starred by qualifying on pole ahead of Scheckter and home hero Villeneuve. Jarier could easily lead into the first corner, with Jones jumping up to second after a brilliant start and dropping Scheckter down to third. As Jarier began to pull away, Jones suffered a slow puncture and fell down the field as the race progressed, promoting Scheckter to second and Villeneuve to third, and then Villeneuve passed Scheckter mid-race to take second. Jarier continued to dominate until he retired with an oil leak, leaving Villeneuve to take his first career win in his home race ahead of Scheckter, with Reutemann taking third.

== Results and standings ==
=== Grands Prix ===
Round	Grand Prix	Pole position	Fastest lap	Winning driver	Winning constructor	Report
1	(Argentina) Argentine Grand Prix	(United States) Mario Andretti	(Canada) Gilles Villeneuve	(United States) Mario Andretti	(United Kingdom) Lotus-Ford	Report
2	(Brazil) Brazilian Grand Prix	(Sweden) Ronnie Peterson	(Argentina) Carlos Reutemann	(Argentina) Carlos Reutemann	(Italy) Ferrari	Report
3	(South Africa) South African Grand Prix	(Austria) Niki Lauda	(United States) Mario Andretti	(Sweden) Ronnie Peterson	(United Kingdom) Lotus-Ford	Report
4	United States Grand Prix West	(Argentina) Carlos Reutemann	(Australia) Alan Jones	(Argentina) Carlos Reutemann	(Italy) Ferrari	Report
5	Monaco Grand Prix	(Argentina) Carlos Reutemann	(Austria) Niki Lauda	(France) Patrick Depailler	(United Kingdom) Tyrrell-Ford	Report
6	(Belgium) Belgian Grand Prix	(United States) Mario Andretti	(Sweden) Ronnie Peterson	(United States) Mario Andretti	(United Kingdom) Lotus-Ford	Report
7	(Spain) Spanish Grand Prix	(United States) Mario Andretti	(United States) Mario Andretti	(United States) Mario Andretti	(United Kingdom) Lotus-Ford	Report
8	(Sweden) Swedish Grand Prix	(United States) Mario Andretti	(Austria) Niki Lauda	(Austria) Niki Lauda	(United Kingdom) Brabham-Alfa Romeo	Report
9	(France) French Grand Prix	(United Kingdom) John Watson	(Argentina) Carlos Reutemann	(United States) Mario Andretti	(United Kingdom) Lotus-Ford	Report
10	(United Kingdom) British Grand Prix	(Sweden) Ronnie Peterson	(Austria) Niki Lauda	(Argentina) Carlos Reutemann	(Italy) Ferrari	Report
11	(West Germany) German Grand Prix	(United States) Mario Andretti	(Sweden) Ronnie Peterson	(United States) Mario Andretti	(United Kingdom) Lotus-Ford	Report
12	(Austria) Austrian Grand Prix	(Sweden) Ronnie Peterson	(Sweden) Ronnie Peterson	(Sweden) Ronnie Peterson	(United Kingdom) Lotus-Ford	Report
13	(Netherlands) Dutch Grand Prix	(United States) Mario Andretti	(Austria) Niki Lauda	(United States) Mario Andretti	(United Kingdom) Lotus-Ford	Report
14	(Italy) Italian Grand Prix	(United States) Mario Andretti	(United States) Mario Andretti	(Austria) Niki Lauda (Note: Mario Andretti originally won the race, but later received a one-minute time penalty for jump start following fatal accident of Ronnie Peterson. Niki Lauda, initially classified second, inherited the win.)	(United Kingdom) Brabham-Alfa Romeo	Report
15	United States Grand Prix	(United States) Mario Andretti	(France) Jean-Pierre Jarier	(Argentina) Carlos Reutemann	(Italy) Ferrari	Report
16	(Canada) Canadian Grand Prix	(France) Jean-Pierre Jarier	(Australia) Alan Jones	(Canada) Gilles Villeneuve	(Italy) Ferrari	Report

=== Scoring system ===
Points were awarded to the top six classified finishers. The International Cup for F1 Constructors only counted the points of the highest-finishing driver for each race. For both the Championship and the Cup, the best seven results from rounds 1-8 and the best seven results from rounds 9-16 were counted.

Numbers without parentheses are championship points; numbers in parentheses are total points scored. Points were awarded in the following system:

Position	1st	2nd	3rd	4th	5th	6th
Race	9	6	4	3	2	1

=== World Drivers' Championship standings ===
Pos	Driver	ARG (Argentina)	BRA (Brazil)	RSA (South Africa)	USW (United States)	MON (Monaco)	BEL (Belgium)	ESP (Spain)	SWE (Sweden)	FRA (France)	GBR (United Kingdom)	GER (West Germany)	AUT (Austria)	NED (Netherlands)	ITA (Italy)	USA (United States)	CAN (Canada)	Pts
1	(United States) Mario Andretti	1^{P}	4	7^{F}	2	11	1^{P}	1^{P}^{F}	Ret^{P}	1	Ret	1^{P}	Ret	1^{P}	6^{P}^{F}	Ret^{P}	10	64
2	(Sweden) Ronnie Peterson	5	Ret^{P}	1	4	Ret	2^{F}	2	3	2	Ret^{P}	Ret^{F}	1^{P}^{F}	2	Ret			51
3	(Argentina) Carlos Reutemann	7	1^{F}	Ret	1^{P}	8^{P}	3	Ret	10	18^{F}	1	Ret	DSQ	7	3	1	3	48
4	(Austria) Niki Lauda	2	3	Ret^{P}	Ret	2^{F}	Ret	Ret	1^{F}	Ret	2^{F}	Ret	Ret	3^{F}	1	Ret	Ret	44
5	(France) Patrick Depailler	3	Ret	2	3	1	Ret	Ret	Ret	Ret	4	Ret	2	Ret	11	Ret	5	34
6	(United Kingdom) John Watson	Ret	8	3	Ret	4	Ret	5	Ret	4^{P}	3	7	7	4	2	Ret	Ret	25
7	(South Africa) Jody Scheckter	10	Ret	Ret	Ret	3	Ret	4	Ret	6	Ret	2	Ret	12	12	3	2	24
8	(France) Jacques Laffite	16	9	5	5	Ret	5	3	7	7	10	3	5	8	4	11	Ret	19
9	(Canada) Gilles Villeneuve	8^{F}	Ret	Ret	Ret	Ret	4	10	9	12	Ret	8	3	6	7	Ret	1	17
=	(Brazil) Emerson Fittipaldi	9	2	Ret	8	9	Ret	Ret	6	Ret	Ret	4	4	5	8	5	Ret	17
11	(Australia) Alan Jones	Ret	11	4	7^{F}	Ret	10	8	Ret	5	Ret	Ret	Ret	Ret	13	2	9^{F}	11
=	(Italy) Riccardo Patrese		10	Ret	6	6	Ret	Ret	2	8	Ret	9	Ret	Ret	Ret		4	11
13	(United Kingdom) James Hunt	4	Ret	Ret	Ret	Ret	Ret	6	8	3	Ret	DSQ	Ret	10	Ret	7	Ret	8
=	(France) Patrick Tambay	6	Ret	Ret	12	7		Ret	4	9	6	Ret	Ret	9	5	6	8	8
15	(France) Didier Pironi	14	6	6	Ret	5	6	12	Ret	10	Ret	5	Ret	Ret	Ret	10	7	7
16	(Switzerland) Clay Regazzoni	15	5	DNQ	10	DNQ	Ret	15	5	Ret	Ret	DNQ	NC	DNQ	NC	14	DNQ	4
17	(France) Jean-Pierre Jabouille			Ret	Ret	10	NC	13	Ret	Ret	Ret	Ret	Ret	Ret	Ret	4	12	3
18	(West Germany) Hans-Joachim Stuck	17	Ret	DNQ	DNS	Ret	Ret	Ret	11	11	5	Ret	Ret	Ret	Ret	Ret	Ret	2
19	(Mexico) Héctor Rebaque	DNQ	Ret	10	DNPQ	DNPQ	DNPQ	Ret	12	DNQ	Ret	6	Ret	11	DNQ	Ret	DNQ	1
=	(Italy) Vittorio Brambilla	18	DNQ	12	Ret	DNQ	13	7	Ret	17	9	Ret	6	DSQ	Ret			1
=	(Republic of Ireland) Derek Daly				DNPQ	DNPQ	DNQ			DNQ	Ret		DSQ	Ret	10	8	6	1
—	(United States) Brett Lunger	13	Ret	11	DNQ	DNPQ	7	DNQ	DNQ	Ret	8	DNPQ	8	Ret	Ret	13		0
—	(Italy) Bruno Giacomelli						8			Ret	7			Ret	14			0
—	(West Germany) Jochen Mass	11	7	Ret	Ret	DNQ	11	9	13	13	NC	Ret	DNQ	DNQ				0
—	(France) Jean-Pierre Jarier	12	DNS	8	11	DNQ						DNQ				15^{F}	Ret^{P}	0
—	(France) René Arnoux			DNQ		DNPQ	9			14		DNPQ	9	Ret		9	Ret	0
—	(West Germany) Rolf Stommelen			9	9	Ret	Ret	14	14	15	DNQ	DSQ	DNPQ	DNPQ	DNPQ	16	DNQ	0
—	(Brazil) Nelson Piquet											Ret	Ret	Ret	9		11	0
—	(Finland) Keke Rosberg			Ret	DNPQ	DNPQ	DNQ	DNPQ	15	16	Ret	10	NC	Ret	DNPQ	Ret	NC	0
—	(United Kingdom) Rupert Keegan	Ret	Ret	Ret	DNS	Ret	DNQ	11	DNQ	Ret	DNQ	DNQ	DNQ	DNS				0
—	(Austria) Harald Ertl											11	Ret	DNPQ	DNQ			0
—	(Belgium) Jacky Ickx					Ret	12	Ret	DNQ									0
—	(United States) Bobby Rahal															12	Ret	0
—	(Italy) Arturo Merzario	Ret	DNQ	Ret	Ret	DNPQ	DNPQ	DNQ	NC	DNQ	Ret	DNQ	DNQ	Ret	Ret	Ret	DNQ	0
—	(Italy) Lamberto Leoni	Ret	DNS	DNQ	DNQ													0
—	(United States) Danny Ongais	Ret	Ret		DNPQ									DNPQ				0
—	(Netherlands) Michael Bleekemolen													DNQ	DNQ	Ret	DNQ	0
—	(United States) Eddie Cheever	DNQ	DNQ	Ret														0
—	(Italy) Alberto Colombo						DNQ	DNQ							DNPQ			0
—	(United Kingdom) Divina Galica	DNQ	DNQ															0
—	(Italy) Beppe Gabbiani															DNQ	DNQ	0
—	(Spain) Emilio de Villota							DNQ										0
—	(United Kingdom) Geoff Lees										DNQ							0
—	(United Kingdom) Tony Trimmer										DNQ							0
—	(Austria) Hans Binder												DNQ					0
—	(Italy) Gimax														DNQ			0
—	(Belgium) Patrick Nève						DNP											0
—	(Belgium) Bernard de Dryver						DNP											0
Pos	Driver	ARG (Argentina)	BRA (Brazil)	RSA (South Africa)	USW (United States)	MON (Monaco)	BEL (Belgium)	ESP (Spain)	SWE (Sweden)	FRA (France)	GBR (United Kingdom)	GER (West Germany)	AUT (Austria)	NED (Netherlands)	ITA (Italy)	USA (United States)	CAN (Canada)	Pts

Key
Colour	Result
Gold	Winner
Silver	Second place
Bronze	Third place
Green	Other points position
Blue	Other classified position
Blue	Not classified, finished (NC)
Purple	Not classified, retired (Ret)
Red	Did not qualify (DNQ)
Black	Disqualified (DSQ)
White	Did not start (DNS)
White	Race cancelled (C)
Blank	Did not practice (DNP)
Blank	Excluded (EX)
Blank	Did not arrive (DNA)
Blank	Withdrawn (WD)
Blank	Did not enter (empty cell)
Annotation	Meaning
P	Pole position
F	Fastest lap

=== International Cup for F1 Constructors standings ===
Pos	Constructor	ARG (Argentina)	BRA (Brazil)	RSA (South Africa)	USW (United States)	MON (Monaco)	BEL (Belgium)	ESP (Spain)	SWE (Sweden)	FRA (France)	GBR (United Kingdom)	GER (West Germany)	AUT (Austria)	NED (Netherlands)	ITA (Italy)	USA (United States)	CAN (Canada)	Pts
1	(United Kingdom) Lotus-Ford	1	4	1	2	11	1	1	3	1	Ret	1	1	1	6	15	10	86
2	(Italy) Ferrari	7	1	Ret	1	8	3	10	9	12	1	8	3	6	3	1	1	58
3	(United Kingdom) Brabham-Alfa Romeo	2	3	3	Ret	2	Ret	5	1	4	2	7	7	3	1	Ret	11	53
4	(United Kingdom) Tyrrell-Ford	3	6	2	3	1	6	12	Ret	10	4	5	2	Ret	11	10	5	38
5	(Canada) Wolf-Ford	10	Ret	Ret	Ret	3	Ret	4	Ret	6	Ret	2	NC	12	12	3	2	24
6	(France) Ligier-Matra	16	9	5	5	Ret	5	3	7	7	10	3	5	8	4	11	Ret	19
7	(Brazil) Fittipaldi-Ford	9	2	Ret	8	9	Ret	Ret	6	Ret	Ret	4	4	5	8	5	Ret	17
8	(United Kingdom) McLaren-Ford	4	Ret	11	12	7	7	6	4	3	6	Ret	8	9	5	6	8	15
9	(United Kingdom) Williams-Ford	Ret	11	4	7	Ret	10	8	Ret	5	Ret	Ret	Ret	Ret	13	2	9	11
=	(United Kingdom) Arrows-Ford		10	9	6	6	Ret	14	2	8	Ret	9	Ret	Ret	Ret	16	4	11
11	(United Kingdom) Shadow-Ford	15	5	DNQ	10	Ret	Ret	15	5	11	5	Ret	NC	Ret	NC	14	Ret	6
12	(France) Renault			Ret	Ret	10	NC	13	Ret	Ret	Ret	Ret	Ret	Ret	Ret	4	12	3
13	(United Kingdom) Surtees-Ford	18	Ret	12	Ret	Ret	13	7	Ret	17	9	Ret	6	DSQ	Ret	9	Ret	1
=	(United Kingdom) Ensign-Ford	Ret	Ret	DNQ	DNQ	Ret	12	Ret	DNQ	DNQ	Ret	11	Ret	Ret	10	8	6	1
—	(Germany) ATS-Ford	11	7	8	11	DNQ	11	9	13	13	NC	Ret	DNQ	DNQ	DNQ	Ret	NC	0
—	(France) Martini-Ford			DNQ		DNPQ	9	WD		14	WD	DNPQ	9	Ret				0
—	(Italy) Merzario-Ford	Ret	DNQ	Ret	Ret	DNPQ	DNPQ	DNQ	NC	DNQ	Ret	DNQ	DNQ	Ret	Ret	Ret	DNQ	0
—	(Hong Kong) Theodore-Ford	DNQ	DNQ	Ret	DNPQ	DNPQ	DNQ	DNPQ										0
—	(United Kingdom) Hesketh-Ford	DNQ	DNQ	Ret	DNPQ	DNPQ	DNQ											0
—	(United Kingdom) March-Ford						DNP											0
Pos	Constructor	ARG (Argentina)	BRA (Brazil)	RSA (South Africa)	USW (United States)	MON (Monaco)	BEL (Belgium)	ESP (Spain)	SWE (Sweden)	FRA (France)	GBR (United Kingdom)	GER (West Germany)	AUT (Austria)	NED (Netherlands)	ITA (Italy)	USA (United States)	CAN (Canada)	Pts

Official FIA results for the 1978 International Cup for F1 Constructors listed the positions as (1) JPS-Lotus (2) Ferrari (3) Brabham-Alfa (4) Elf-Tyrrell (5) Wolf (6) Ligier-Matra (7) Copersucar (8) McLaren (9) Williams & Arrows (11) Shadow (12) Renault (13) Surtees & Ensign.

== Non-championship race ==
A single non-championship Formula One race was held in 1978: the BRDC International Trophy, staged at Silverstone. This was the last time this event was run under Formula One regulations. The race was won by future World Champion Keke Rosberg, driving in only his second Formula One event.

Race name	Circuit	Date	Winning driver	Constructor	Report
(United Kingdom) XXX BRDC International Trophy	Silverstone	19 March	(Finland) Keke Rosberg	(United Kingdom) Theodore-Cosworth	Report
