= Ligier JS9 =

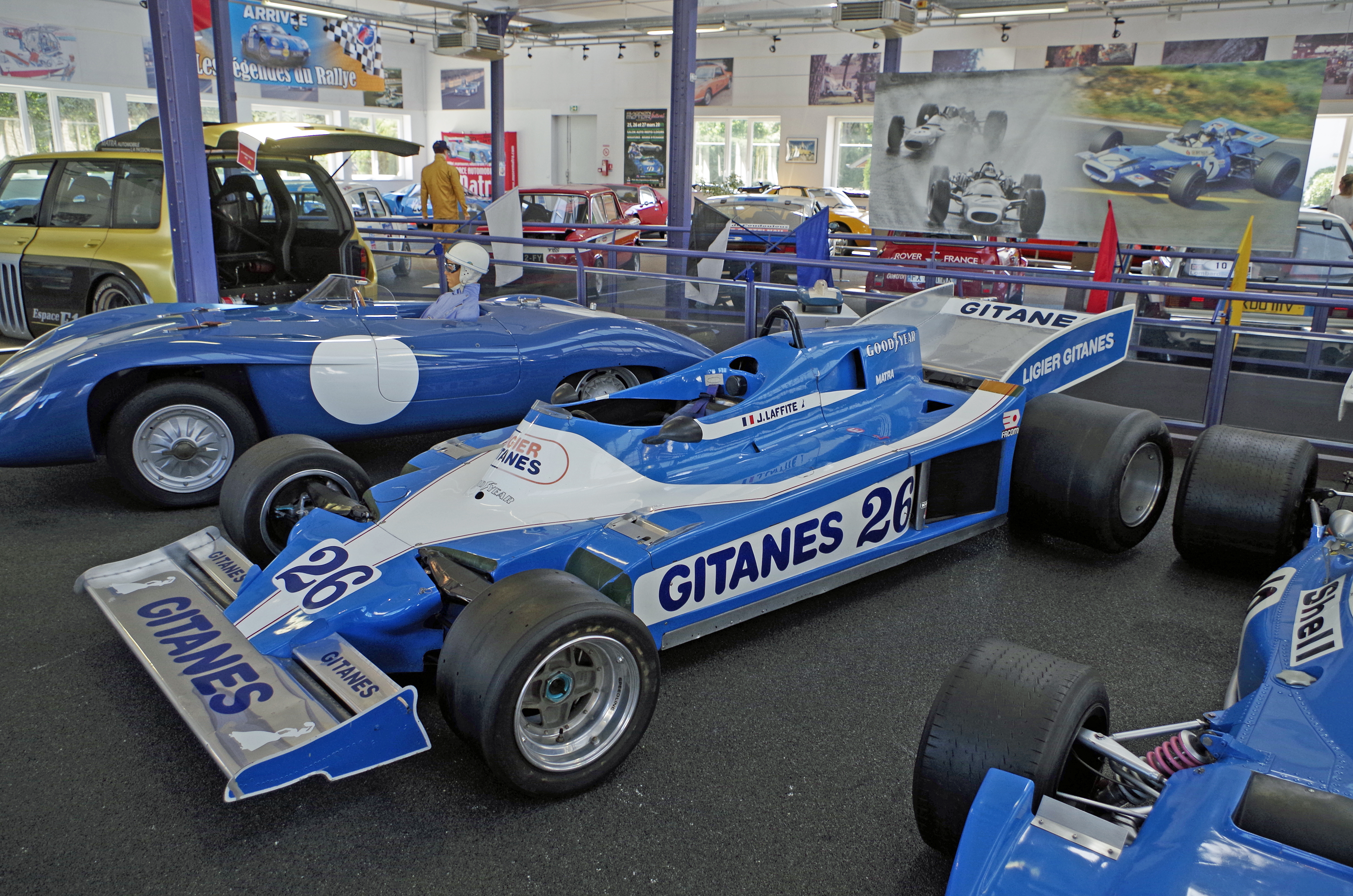
- Category: Formula One
- Constructor: Ligier
- Designers: Gérard Ducarouge (Technical Director); Michel Beaujon (Chief Designer); Robert Choulet (Head of Aerodynamics)
- Predecessor: JS7
- Successor: JS11

Technical specifications
- Chassis: Aluminium monocoque
- Axle track: Front: 1,625 mm (64.0 in); Rear: 1,515 mm (59.6 in)
- Wheelbase: 2,800 mm (110 in)
- Engine: Matra MS76, 2,993 cc (182.6 cu in), 60° V12, NA, mid-engine, longitudinally mounted
- Transmission: Hewland FGA 400, 6-speed manual
- Weight: 580 kg (1,280 lb)
- Fuel: Shell
- Tyres: Goodyear

Competition history
- Notable entrants: Ligier Gitanes
- Notable drivers: (France) Jacques Laffite
- Debut: 1978 Spanish Grand Prix
- Last event: 1978 Canadian Grand Prix
Races	Wins	Poles	F/Laps
10	0	0	0
- Constructors' Championships: 0
- Drivers' Championships: 0

The Ligier JS9 was a Formula One racing car manufactured and raced by Ligier during the 1978 Formula One season. Driven by Frenchman Jacques Laffite, its best finish was third (twice).

== Development ==
The JS9 was designed by Gérard Ducarouge and Michel Beaujon, with Robert Choulet working on aerodynamics. The JS9 had a large rear wing, but did not use the ground effects aerodynamics that was being developed by Lotus and other teams. The Hewland TL200 gearbox of the previous year was upgraded to the more lightweight Hewland FGA 6-speed and it continued to use the Matra MS76 V12 engine. However development of the V12 ceased during the year which may have affected the results achieved by the car. A total of two JS9 chassis were built, with the second of these having revised suspension.

The JS9 was the last Ligier car that used a Matra V12 with the 1979 car being designed around a Cosworth engine.

== Racing history ==
For the 1978 season, Ligier continued to run a single entry for Jacques Laffite, the team's regular driver. After completing the first six races of the season with the JS7 and JS7/9 (a hybrid car), the JS9 made its debut at the Monaco Grand Prix. Laffite qualified it fifteenth on the grid and in the race itself retired with gearbox issues. At the next race in which the JS9 ran, the Spanish Grand Prix, he finished on the podium in third, having qualified tenth. After finishing out of the points for the next three races, he finished third again in Germany, this time from seventh on the grid.

With Laffite now driving the second of the two JS9 chassis that had been built, two further points finishes were achieved, a fifth in Austria (having qualified fifth, the best starting position Lafitte achieved with the JS9) and fourth in Italy. Laffite enjoyed good reliability, retiring from just two races, Monaco and the season ending Canadian Grand Prix.

== Complete Formula One World Championship results ==
(key) (Results in bold indicate pole position; results in italics indicate fastest lap)

Year	Team	Engine	Tyres	Drivers	1	2	3	4	5	6	7	8	9	10	11	12	13	14	15	16	Points	WCC
1978	Équipe Ligier	Matra MS76	**G**		ARG	BRA	RSA	USW	MON	BEL	ESP	SWE	FRA	GBR	GER	AUT	NED	ITA	USA	CAN	**19***	**6th**
1978	Équipe Ligier	Matra MS76	**G**	Jacques Laffite					Ret		3		7	10	3	5	8	4	11	Ret	**19***	**6th**

* 6 points scored in 1978 were with the JS7 and JS7/9
