= Robert Choulet =

French aerodynamicist

Robert Paul Aimé Choulet (born 28 February 1935) is a French aerodynamics engineer influential in race car dynamics.

== Career ==
A disciple of aerodynamics pioneer Charles Deutsch, Choulet worked for Deutsch's Société d'Études et de Réalisations Automobiles (SERA-CD ) from 1963 to 1967. During this period, he worked on the aerodynamics of the CD cars.

He then joined Matra in 1968. One of his first projects was the Matra M640 Le Mans 24 Hours car. Following that, he returned to SERA-CD and was involved in designing the famous Porsche 917 especially the LH version, and the Can-Am cars that followed. He later was influential in designing the Alfa Romeo 33TT12.

From 1976 to 1980, Choulet worked with the Ligier Formula One team, being involved in the design of the JS5, JS7, JS9, JS11 and JS11/15 models.

SERA and Choulet also worked with the Alfa Romeo sports car team in 1977 and on Alfa's Formula One car in 1979.

Choulet created the Aérodyne company in 1983 working on such different cars as Formula Ford Rondeau and Audi Quattro for rally racing. He then worked for many years for Peugeot. He was also influential in the Group C Peugeot 905 programme (notably the Ev1bis and Ev 2 "Supercopter" with radical aerodynamic solutions) as well as for Jordan Formula One team and the rally cars Peugeot 206 and Citroën Xsara WRC.

In the 2000s, he became involved with Panasonic Toyota Racing and has been a consultant for Toyota Motorsport GmbH (TMG) in Cologne since 2011.

== Education ==
- Lycée du Parc
- Ecole centrale Paris in 1959
- IFP School - Ecole Nationale Supérieure du Pétrole et des Moteurs (Major : Engines) in 1960.

== Distinctions ==
- Joseph Béthenod Prize
- Society of Automotive Engineers : Massion Award (1987)

== Others ==
- Membership : SIA (Society of Automotive Engineers)
- Auto Hebdo n° 229, 21 August 1980
