= Ligier JS11 =

Formula One car

Ligier JS11 Ligier JS11/15
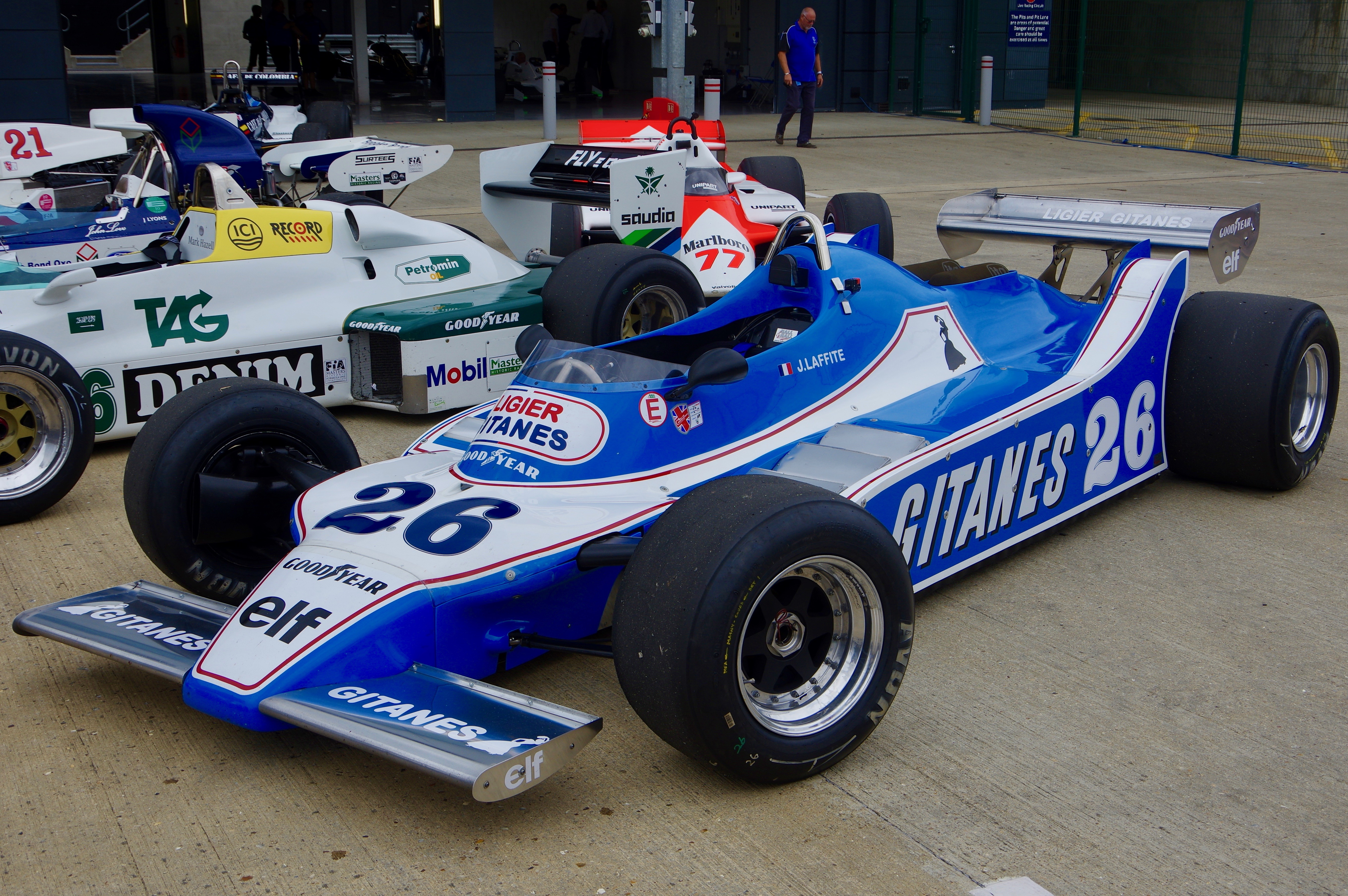
- Jacques Laffite's Ligier JS11/15 in exhibition.
- Category: Formula One
- Constructor: Ligier
- Designers: Gérard Ducarouge (Technical Director); Michel Beaujon (Chief Designer); Robert Choulet (Head of Aerodynamics)
- Predecessor: JS9
- Successor: JS17

Technical specifications
- Chassis: Aluminium monocoque
- Axle track: Front: 1,738 mm (68.4 in); Rear: 1,600 mm (63 in)
- Wheelbase: 2,794 mm (110.0 in)
- Engine: Ford Cosworth DFV, 2,993 cc (182.6 cu in), 60° V8, NA, mid-engine, longitudinally mounted
- Transmission: Hewland FGA 400, 6-speed manual
- Weight: 580 kg (1,280 lb)
- Fuel: Shell
- Tyres: Goodyear

Competition history
- Notable entrants: Ligier Gitanes
- Notable drivers: (France) Jacques Laffite (1979–80) (France) Patrick Depailler (1979) (Belgium) Jacky Ickx (1979) (France) Didier Pironi (1980)
- Debut: 1979 Argentine Grand Prix
- First win: 1979 Argentine Grand Prix
- Last win: 1980 German Grand Prix
- Last event: 1980 United States Grand Prix
Races	Wins	Poles	F/Laps
29	5	6	6
- Constructors' Championships: 0
- Drivers' Championships: 0

The Ligier JS11 was a ground effect Formula One car designed by Gérard Ducarouge. It was powered by the Ford Cosworth DFV married to a Ligier in-house built gearbox. It competed in the 1979 and 1980 World Championships and proved to be very competitive.

Driven by Jacques Laffite, the car won the first two races of the 1979 season and scored consistently. The Ligiers stayed in contention throughout the season, with Patrick Depailler winning a further race in Spain. The team eventually finished third behind Ferrari and Williams in the constructors' championship. Depailler was injured halfway through the season in a hang-gliding accident and was replaced by Jacky Ickx, but he struggled to keep pace with the car and his teammate and left at the end of the season, having scored only a handful of points.

However, the car soon proved to have problems, starting at the fourth race of the season at Long Beach in the United States. The car was in fact so efficient at producing downforce that the aluminium chassis simply could not handle the amount of downforce it was producing. As a result, the chassis began to flex and the skirts would then be lifted off the ground, ruining the ground effect suction. This was an issue that hampered the team throughout the season, and it could not be solved in time for Laffite to properly challenge the Ferraris of Jody Scheckter and Gilles Villeneuve, and later the all-dominant Williams of Alan Jones.

== JS11/15 ==
For 1980, the JS11 was updated with improved aerodynamics and better ground effects. The team took on Didier Pironi in place of Depailler. Again the car was fast and competitive, but the Brabham BT49 and the Williams FW07 proved to be the cars to beat, with Alan Jones taking the world championship. Even so, the team still scored two wins, and would surely have taken more but for several suspension and tyre failures in the mid season. Although the chassis flexing issues had been solved, the car was still producing so much downforce that the suspension and wheelhubs were coming under direct loading and therefore stress fractures developed. This was due to the immense pressure exerted on the suspension arms and the wheels by the ground effect, causing them to fail under hard braking. This effectively cost Ligier the chance to fight with Williams and Brabham for both titles.

The team finished second in the constructors' championship in 1980 ahead of Brabham, and the JS11 evolved into the JS17 for 1981. The JS11 was used as a primary test car for Michelin to experiment with their tyres.

In all the JS11 took five wins, seven pole positions and scored 127 points in its career.

== Clapet ==
To solve the issues with the increased downforce, Gérard Ducarouge came up with a solution, dubbed the "clapet" (French for "valve"), where in a series of flaps within the venturi tunnels would open up at after a certain amount of pressure. As the solution constituted a movable aerodynamic device, the team did its best to keep the existence of the system a secret. The existence of the system was eventually discovered by F1 technical illustrator Giorgio Piola during the final race of the 1980 season at Watkins Glen. Piola was able to take photographs of the system after one of the two cars entered by Ligier was being repaired after a shunt.

== In popular culture ==
The JS11 notably appeared in the first Transformers toyline and its accompanying animated series as the alternate mode of the Autobot Mirage. To comply with strict regulations in various countries that outlawed tobacco advertising on toys and media, the "Gitanes" logo was deliberately misspelled as "Citanes".
