= Ligier JS5 =

Formula One racing car

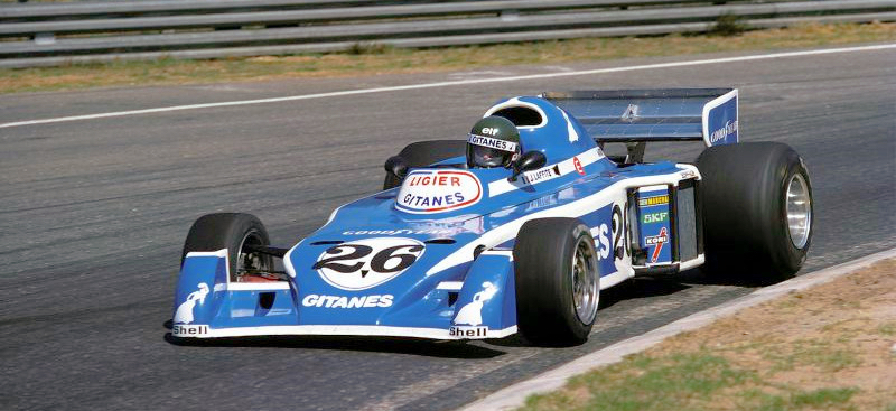
- Jacques Laffite driving the JS5 at the 1976 Italian Grand Prix
- Category: Formula One
- Constructor: Ligier
- Designers: Gérard Ducarouge (Technical Director); Michel Beaujon (Chief Designer); Robert Choulet (Head of Aerodynamics)
- Successor: JS7

Technical specifications
- Chassis: Aluminium monocoque
- Axle track: Front: 1,536 mm (60.5 in); Rear: 1,600 mm (63 in)
- Wheelbase: 2,608 mm (102.7 in)
- Engine: Matra MS73, 2,993 cc (182.6 cu in), 60° V12, NA, mid-engine, longitudinally mounted
- Transmission: Hewland 2-200 TL, 5-speed manual
- Weight: 525 kg (1,157 lb)
- Fuel: Shell
- Tyres: Goodyear

Competition history
- Notable entrants: Ligier Gitanes
- Notable drivers: 26. (France) Jacques Laffite
- Debut: 1976 Brazilian Grand Prix
- Last event: 1976 Japanese Grand Prix
Races	Wins	Poles	F/Laps
16	0	1	1
- Constructors' Championships: 0
- Drivers' Championships: 0

The Ligier JS5 was the first Formula One car built by Ligier. Designed by Gérard Ducarouge, it competed in the 1976 Formula One season, scoring 20 points and finishing sixth overall in the Constructor's Championship. The car also gave driver Jacques Laffite and Ligier their first ever pole position at the 1976 Italian Grand Prix at Monza.

== Background ==
Guy Ligier was a Frenchman that had become wealthy as a result of his construction company. Having participated briefly in Formula One as a driver in the 1960s, he founded a race car company in 1969. This made sportscars, including the JS2 which was raced at Le Mans in 1972. In late 1974, having secured backing from the French tobacco company SEITA, he recruited Gérard Ducarouge from Matra and set about preparing an entry for Formula One.

== Design and development ==
Ducarouge, with assistance from Michel Beaujon, drew up a conventional monocoque with a long wheelbase that was to be designated the JS5. (Note: The JS designation was in tribute to Jo Schlesser, a good friend of Ligier's who had been killed in the 1968 French Grand Prix.) The JS5 was powered by the Matra MS73 V12 engine which has been used in sportscar racing for the previous few seasons. It was completed in October 1975 and exhibited at SEITA's main offices in Paris and the following month began testing at the Circuit Paul Ricard. To drive the car, Ligier contracted Jacques Laffite after briefly considering the experienced Jean-Pierre Beltoise.

The early races of the year were completed with the JS5 bearing a large airbox (earning the car the nickname of "Teapot") but changes in regulations following the 1976 Spanish Grand Prix saw this drastically downsized. The rear wing was also moved forward. The aerodynamics were improved at the time of building the second JS5 chassis and were substantially less curved than the first chassis built and raced.

== Racing history ==
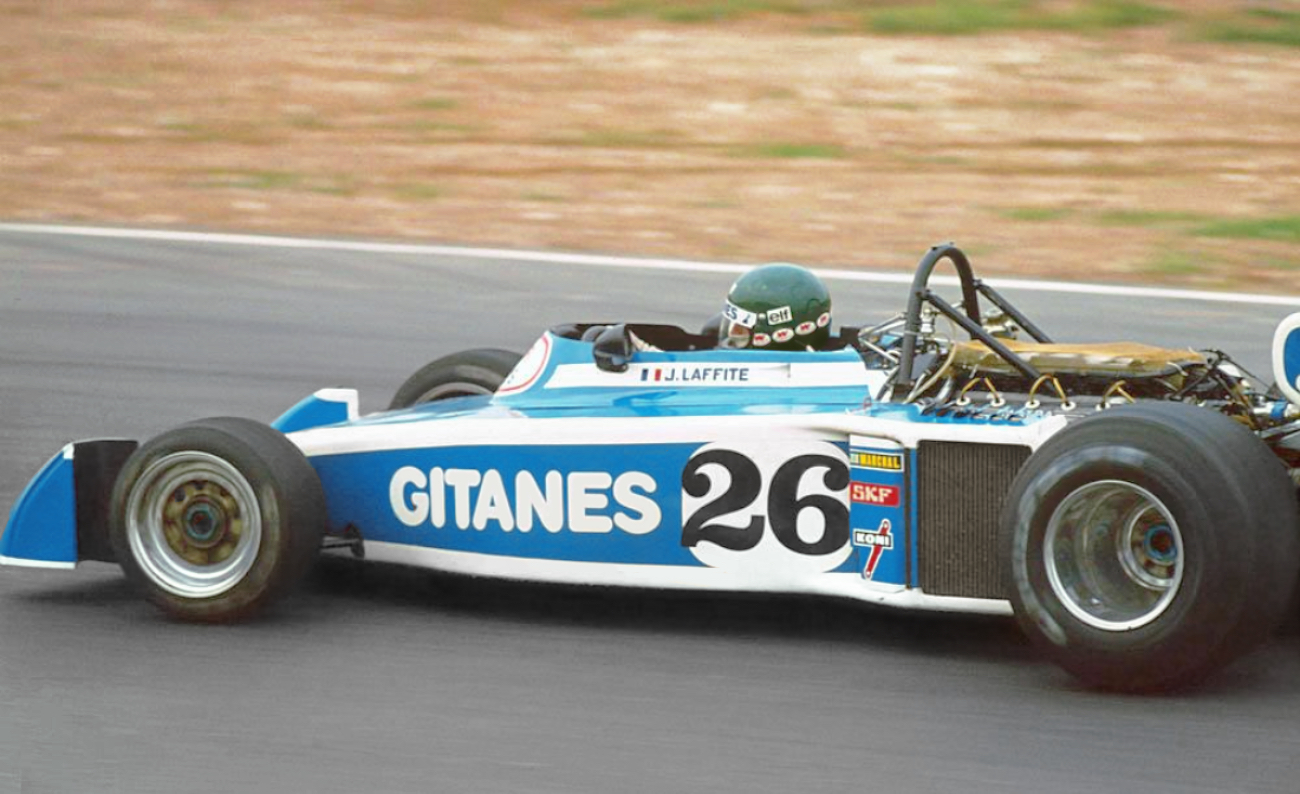
Jacques Laffite driving the JS5

The JS5 made its debut at the opening race of the 1976 season, the Brazilian Grand Prix, where Laffite qualified it in 11th place on the grid. He retired from the race itself, as he did from the following race in South Africa. At Long Beach, the third race of the year, from 12th on the grid, Laffite drove the JS5 to fourth place earning Ligier its first points. He scored his first podium in Belgium, where he finished in third place from sixth on the grid.

Laffite followed this performance up with another fourth at the Swedish Grand Prix. By the time of the Austrian race, a new chassis had been completed which Laffite used to great effect by finishing second from fifth on the grid. He was again on the podium in Italy where he finished third having qualified in pole position.

By the end of the season, Ligier, with 20 points, placed sixth in the Constructor's Championship. Laffite was seventh in the Driver's Championship.

== Results ==
(key) (results in bold indicate pole position)

Year	Entrant	Engine	Tyres	Drivers	Grands Prix																Points	WCC
Year	Entrant	Engine	Tyres	Drivers	BRA	RSA	USW	ESP	BEL	MON	SWE	FRA	GBR	GER	AUT	NED	ITA	CAN	USA	JPN	Points	WCC
1976	Équipe Ligier	Matra V12	**G**	Jacques Laffite	Ret	Ret	4	12	3	12	4	14	DSQ	Ret	2	Ret	**3**	Ret	Ret	7	20	6th

== Notes ==
Footnotes

Citations
