= Jacques Laffite =

French racing driver (born 1943)

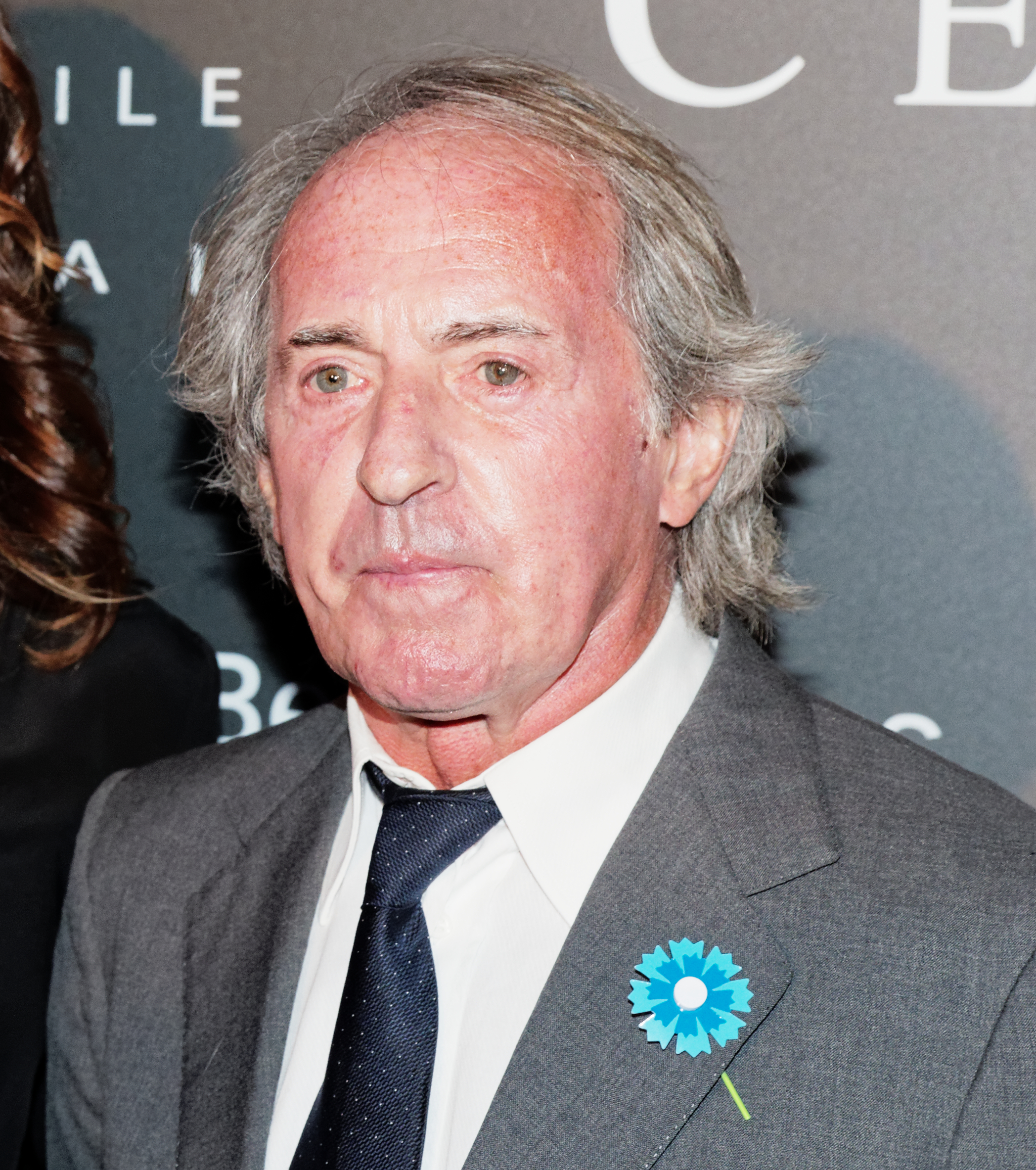
- Laffite in 2015
- Born: Jacques-Henri Marie Sabin Laffite; 21 November 1943 (age 82); Paris, Nazi-occupied France
- Spouses: Bernadette Cottin (m. 1977–1992) Florence Gericot (m. 1993)
- Children: 2, including Margot
- Relatives: Jean-Pierre Jabouille (brother-in-law); Arnaud Tsamere (son-in-law)

Formula One World Championship career
- Nationality: (France) French
- Active years: 1974–1986
- Team(s): Frank Williams, Ligier, Williams
- Entries: 180 (176 starts)
- Championships: 0
- Wins: 6
- Podiums: 32
- Career points: 228
- Pole positions: 7
- Fastest laps: 7 (Note: The fastest lap at the 1976 Japanese Grand Prix was initially credited to Masahiro Hasemi. This was a measurement mistake and, several days later, Fuji Speedway issued a press release to correct the fastest lap holder of the race to Laffite. This press release was promptly made known in Japan, and the Japan Automobile Federation and Japanese media corrected the record. This correction was not made well known outside Japan; thus, Hasemi is credited with the fastest lap in many record books.)
- First entry: 1974 German Grand Prix
- First win: 1977 Swedish Grand Prix
- Last win: 1981 Canadian Grand Prix
- Last entry: 1986 British Grand Prix

24 Hours of Le Mans career
- Years: 1972–1974, 1977–1978, 1990, 1993–1994, 1996
- Teams: Ligier, Renault, Mirage, Porsche, Venturi, Larbre, McLaren
- Best finish: 8th (1974)
- Class wins: 0

Jacques-Henri Marie Sabin Laffite (French pronunciation: [ʒakɑ̃ʁi lafit]; born 21 November 1943) is a French former racing driver and broadcaster, who competed in Formula One from 1974 to 1986. Laffite won six Formula One Grands Prix across 13 seasons.

Born and raised in Paris, Laffite trained as a racing driver with the Winfield Racing School at Magny-Cours in 1968. Laffite twice entered the 24 Hours of Le Mans with Ligier before making his Formula One debut at the 1974 German Grand Prix with Frank Williams. Laffite remained at Frank Williams through the 1975 season, scoring his maiden podium at the German Grand Prix and winning the European Formula Two Championship with Martini. He moved to Ligier in 1976, taking several podiums amongst his maiden pole position in Italy. Laffite retained his seat the following season, taking his maiden win at the Swedish Grand Prix. After a winless season in 1978, Ligier constructed the highly-competitive JS11 in response to the ground effect era. Laffite won the opening two rounds of the 1979 season—including a grand slam at the Brazilian Grand Prix—but ultimately finished the championship in fourth after suffering eight retirements. Laffite again finished fourth in the 1980 and 1981 championships, losing out on the latter by six points to Nelson Piquet and taking several wins across both. Laffite failed to finish 11 of 15 Grands Prix in 1982, leaving for Williams at the end of the season. After two winless seasons with Williams, amongst further reliability issues, Laffite returned to Ligier in 1985, scoring several podiums. At the 1986 British Grand Prix, Laffite was seriously injured in a multi-car collision that broke both of his legs. He subsequently retired from Formula One, having achieved six wins, seven pole positions, seven fastest laps and 32 podiums.

Outside of Formula One, Laffite was a race-winner in the World Sportscar Championship with Kauhsen, as well as in the BMW M1 Procar Championship with BMW. He competed in the World Touring Car Championship in 1987 with Alfa Corse, and the Deutsche Tourenwagen Meisterschaft from 1990 to 1992. Laffite entered nine editions of the 24 Hours of Le Mans from 1972 to 1996 across multiple classes. Upon retiring from motor racing, Laffite was a presenter for TF1 from 1997 to 2012.

== Early years ==
Jacques-Henri Marie Sabin Laffite was born in Paris on 21 November 1943. He attended the Cours Hattemer, a private school. He was trained as a racing driver in 1968 at Winfield Racing School in France.

== Formula One career ==
Laffite debuted in Formula One in 1974 for Frank Williams' Iso–Marlboro team. The following year he raced for the same team, now named Williams, scoring a second place in the German Grand Prix at the Nürburgring.

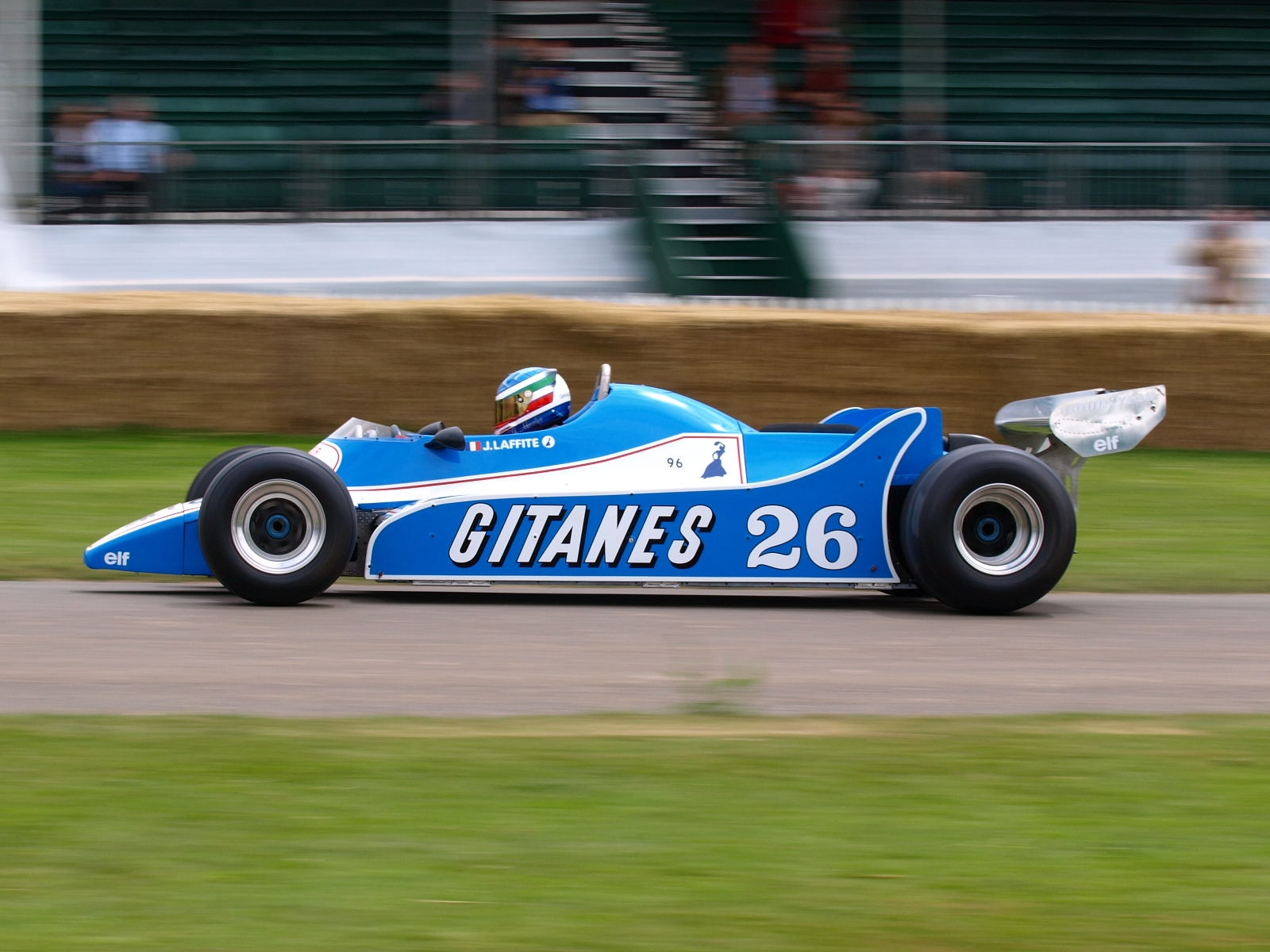
Laffite's 1979 Ligier JS11 being demonstrated at the 2008 Goodwood Festival of Speed

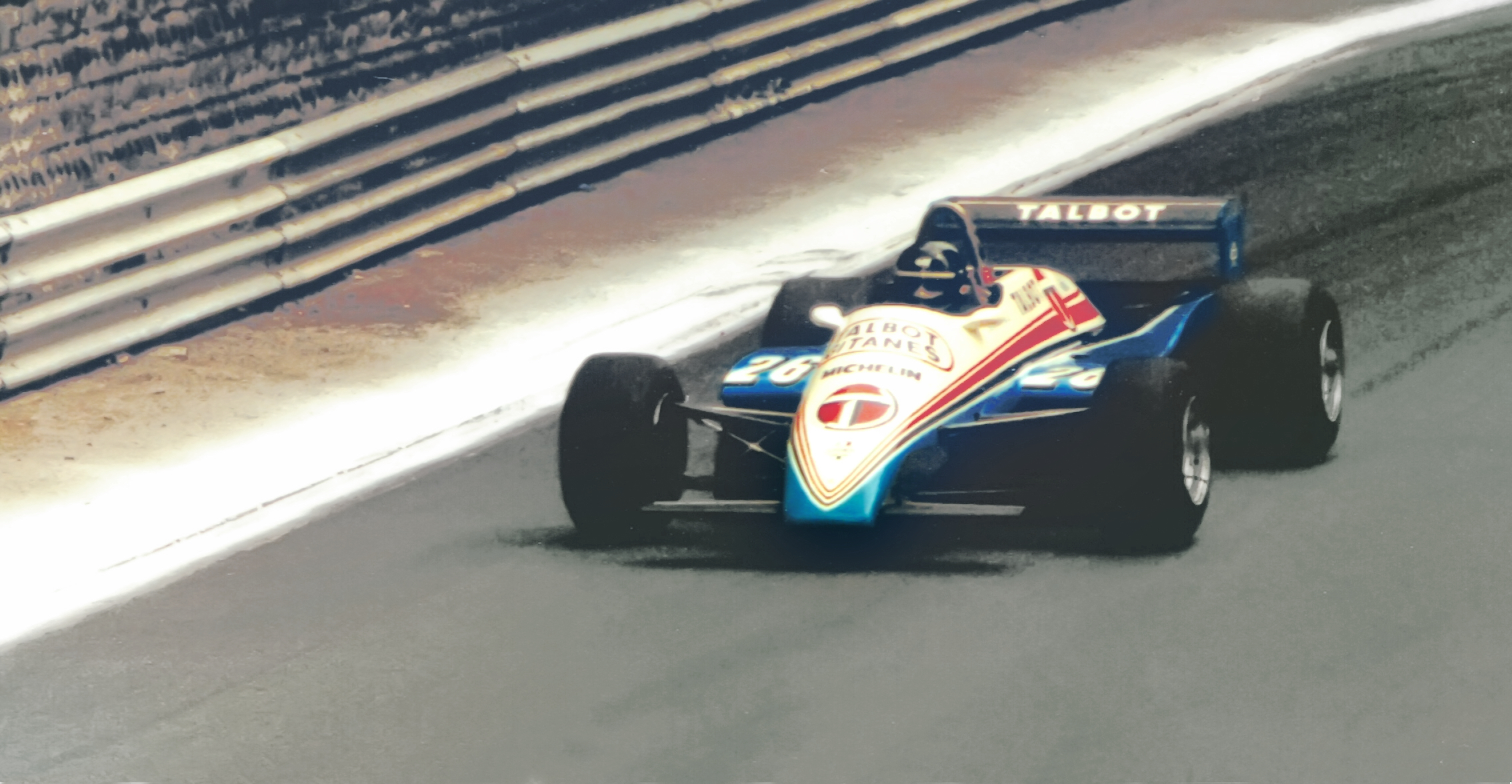
Laffite demonstrating the Ligier JS19 chassis at the 1982 Pau Grand Prix

In 1976, Laffite moved to the French Ligier team, scoring 20 points and a pole position at the Italian Grand Prix. The next two seasons were transitional, although he managed to win his first Grand Prix at Anderstorp in the 1977 Swedish Grand Prix.

The 1979 season opened with Laffite winning the first two races. He fought for the World Championship title until the last races, but eventually placed only fourth, with 36 points. The following two seasons were similar, with two more fourth places in the Championship and a further three victories. In 1982, however, Laffite finished only 17th in the final classification, with only 5 points scored.

During the early 1980s, Laffite also made three end of season trips to Australia to race in the non-championship Australian Grand Prix. He failed to finish his first race in 1981 (he was lucky to start after his car hit the wall on the outside of the last turn of the short (1.609 km (1.000 mi)) Calder Park Raceway in qualifying, but his local crew were able to repair it for the race). He finished second to fellow Frenchman Alain Prost in 1982, and third behind Brazilian Roberto Moreno and Australian John Smith in 1983. In all of his pre-Formula One AGP drives, Laffite drove a Formula Pacific or Formula Mondial Ralt RT4 powered by a 1.6-litre Ford I4 engine.

Results in the next two seasons were not much better, when he moved back to England, again to race for Williams (11 and five points, respectively). Now in his forties, Laffite returned to Ligier in 1985: in that season he was on the podium three times (Great Britain, Germany and Australia), for a total of 16 points. In 1986, he scored 14 points including two more podium finishes in the first half of the season, but he broke both legs in a crash at the start of the British Grand Prix at Brands Hatch and thereafter retired from Formula One, ending his career tied with Graham Hill for the most Grand Prix starts at 176. He was the most successful driver in Ligier's history, having taken six of their nine wins.

As a result of Laffite's injuries, new safety rules were enforced from the 1988 season that stated that in all cars the driver's feet must be behind the front axle line.

== Post-Formula One career ==
Laffite recovered from his injuries and later raced in touring cars, finishing 17th in the inaugural World Touring Car Championship driving an Alfa Romeo 75 for Alfa Corse as well as racing three seasons in the German-based DTM series.

Laffite is now a television commentator for the French network TF1, best known for his reaction to the incident at the 1997 European Grand Prix in which Michael Schumacher collided with Jacques Villeneuve, and Laffite reacted with curse words on live television.

Laffite made his 2007 FIA GT3 European Championship debut at the 2008 Bucharest City Challenge, driving for AutoGT Racing Team.

In October 2008, at the age of 64, Laffite tested a Renault R27 F1 car at the Paul Ricard circuit.

Laffite has two daughters: Camille and Margot, a sports journalist of Formula One on Canal+. He is also golf enthusiast, is a shareholder of Dijon-Bourgogne Golf.

Also deeply attached to the Creuse for Golf Fisheries and nature, Laffite has a property in Creuse near Aubusson.

== Racing record ==
=== Career summary ===
Season	Series	Team	Races	Wins	Poles	F/Laps	Podiums	Points	Position
1972	24 Hours of Le Mans	Automobiles Ligier	1	0	0	0	0	N/A	DNF
1973	24 Hours of Le Mans	Automobiles Ligier	1	0	0	0	0	N/A	DSQ
1974	European Formula Two	BP Racing France	10	1	1	1	5	31	**3rd**
1974	Formula One	Frank Williams Racing Cars	5	0	0	0	0	0	NC
1974	24 Hours of Le Mans	Automobiles Ligier	1	0	0	0	0	N/A	8th
1975	European Formula Two	Automobiles Martini	14	6	5	4	7	60	**1st**
1975	Formula One	Frank Williams Racing Cars Williams Ambrozium H7 Racing	10	0	0	0	1	6	12th
1975	World Sportscar Championship	Willi Kauhsen Racing Team	3	3	0	0	3	60	NC
1976	Formula One	Ligier Gitanes	16	0	1	1	3	20	7th
1976	World Sportscar Championship	Equipe Renault Elf	4	0	3	0	1	15	NC
1976	European Formula Two	Fred Opert Racing	2	0	0	1	2	0	NC‡
1976	European Formula Two	Willi Kauhsen Racing Team	1	0	0	0	0	0	NC‡
1977	Formula One	Ligier Gitanes	17	1	0	1	2	18	10th
1977	European Formula Two	Fred Opert Racing	3	0	0	0	0	0	NC
1977	24 Hours of Le Mans	Renault Sport	1	0	0	0	0	N/A	DNF
1978	Formula One	Ligier Gitanes	16	0	0	0	2	19	8th
1978	European Formula Two	Maublanc Racing Services	2	0	0	0	0	0	NC
1978	24 Hours of Le Mans	Grand Touring Cars Inc.	1	0	0	0	0	N/A	10th
1979	Formula One	Ligier Gitanes	15	2	4	2	6	36	4th
1979	BMW M1 Procar Championship	BMW Motorsport	4	1	1	0	2	35	7th
1980	Formula One	Équipe Ligier Gitanes	14	1	1	1	5	34	4th
1980	BMW M1 Procar Championship	BMW Motorsport	6	0	1	0	1	37	9th
1981	Formula One	Équipe Talbot Gitanes	15	2	1	1	7	44	4th
1982	Formula One	Équipe Talbot Gitanes	15	0	0	0	1	5	17th
1983	Formula One	TAG Williams Team	13	0	0	0	0	11	11th
1984	Formula One	Williams Grand Prix Engineering	16	0	0	0	0	5	14th
1985	Formula One	Équipe Ligier Équipe Ligier Gitanes	15	0	0	1	3	16	9th
1986	Formula One	Équipe Ligier	9	0	0	0	2	14	8th
1987	World Touring Car Championship	Alfa Corse	6	0	0	0	0	86	17th
1990	Deutsche Tourenwagen Meisterschaft	Bigazzi M Team	21	1	0	3	3	107	7th
1990	24 Hours of Le Mans	Joest Porsche Racing	1	0	0	0	0	N/A	14th
1991	Deutsche Tourenwagen Meisterschaft	Snobeck S.A.	21	0	2	1	3	81	11th
1992	Deutsche Tourenwagen Meisterschaft	MS Racing	23	0	0	1	0	43	13th
1993	24 Hours of Le Mans	Jacadi Racing	1	0	0	0	0	N/A	DNF
1994	24 Hours of Le Mans	Larbre Compétition	1	0	0	0	0	N/A	DNF
1996	24 Hours of Le Mans	Team Bigazzi SRL	1	0	0	0	0	N/A	11th
2007	FIA GT3 European Championship	AutoGT Racing	6	0	0	0	0	0	22nd
2008	FIA GT3 European Championship	AutoGT Racing	7	0	0	0	0	0	29th
2013	Eurocup Mégane Trophy	Oregon Team	1	0	0	0	0	0	NC†

^{‡} Graded drivers not eligible for European Formula Two Championship points

=== Complete 24 Hours of Le Mans results ===
Year	Team	Co-Drivers	Car	Class	Laps	Pos.	Class Pos.
1972	(France) Automobiles Ligier	(France) Pierre Maublanc	Ligier JS2-Maserati	S 3.0	195	DNF	DNF
1973	(France) Automobiles Ligier	(France) Guy Ligier	Ligier JS2-Maserati	S 3.0	24	DSQ	DSQ
1974	(France) Automobiles Ligier	(France) Alain Serpaggi	Ligier JS2-Maserati	S 3.0	310	8th	5th
1977	(France) Renault Sport	(France) Patrick Depailler	Renault Alpine A442	S +2.0	289	DNF	DNF
1978	(United States) Grand Touring Cars Inc.	(Australia) Vern Schuppan (United States) Sam Posey	Mirage M9-Renault	S +2.0	293	10th	5th
1990	(Germany) Joest Porsche Racing	(France) Henri Pescarolo (France) Jean-Louis Ricci	Porsche 962C	C1	328	14th	14th
1993	(France) Jacadi Racing	(France) Michel Maisonneuve (France) Christophe Dechavanne	Venturi 500LM-Renault	GT	210	DNF	DNF
1994	(France) Larbre Compétition	(France) Jacques Alméras (France) Jean-Marie Alméras	Porsche 911 Carrera RSR	GT2	94	DNF	DNF
1996	(Italy) Team Bigazzi SRL	(United Kingdom) Steve Soper (Belgium) Marc Duez	McLaren F1 GTR-BMW	GT1	318	11th	9th

=== Complete European Formula Two Championship results ===
(key) (Races in bold indicate pole position; races in italics indicate fastest lap)

Year	Entrant	Chassis	Engine	1	2	3	4	5	6	7	8	9	10	11	12	13	14	Pos.	Pts
1974	BP Racing France	March 742	BMW M12	BAR; Ret	HOC; 10	PAU; 2	SAL; 1	HOC; 2	**MUG**; Ret	KAR; 3	PER; 7	HOC; 18	VLL; 3					**3rd**	**31**
1975	Automobiles Martini	Martini Mk 16	BMW M12	EST; 1	**THR**; 1	HOC; Ret	**NÜR**; 1	**PAU**; 1	**HOC**; 1	SAL; NC	ROU; Ret	MUG; Ret	PER; 1	SIL; Ret	**ZOL**; Ret	NOG; Ret	VLL; 2	**1st**	**60**
1976	Fred Opert Racing	Chevron B35	BMW	HOC	THR	VLL	SAL	PAU; 2	HOC	ROU	MUG	PER	EST	NOG; 2				NC	0^{‡}
1976	Willi Kauhsen Racing Team	March 762	Hart												HOC; Ret			NC	0^{‡}
1977	Fred Opert Racing	Chevron B40	Hart	SIL	THR	HOC; 7	NÜR	VLL	PAU; 10	MUG	ROU	NOG; Ret	PER	MIS	EST	DON		NC	0
1978	Maublanc Racing Services	March 782	BMW	THR	HOC	NÜR	PAU; 11	MUG	VLL	ROU	DON	NOG; Ret	PER	MIS	HOC			NC	0

^{‡} Graded drivers not eligible for European Formula Two Championship points

=== Complete Formula One World Championship results ===
(key) (Races in bold indicate pole position, races in italics indicate fastest lap)

Year	Entrant	Chassis	Engine	1	2	3	4	5	6	7	8	9	10	11	12	13	14	15	16	17	WDC	Pts
1974	Frank Williams Racing Cars	Iso–Marlboro FW	Ford Cosworth DFV 3.0 V8	ARG	BRA	RSA	ESP	BEL	MON	SWE	NED	FRA	GBR	GER; Ret	AUT; NC	ITA; Ret	CAN; 15	USA; Ret			NC	0
1975	Frank Williams Racing Cars	Williams FW02	Ford Cosworth DFV 3.0 V8	ARG; Ret	BRA; 11	RSA; NC	ESP														12th	6
1975	Williams Ambrozium H7 Racing	Williams FW04	Ford Cosworth DFV 3.0 V8					MON; DNQ	BEL; Ret	SWE	NED; Ret	FRA; 11	GBR; Ret	GER; 2	AUT; Ret	ITA; Ret	USA; DNS				12th	6
1976	Ligier Gitanes	Ligier JS5	Matra MS73 3.0 V12	BRA; Ret	RSA; Ret	USW; 4	ESP; 12	BEL; 3	MON; 12	SWE; 4	FRA; 14	GBR; DSQ	GER; Ret	AUT; 2	NED; Ret	**ITA**; 3	CAN; Ret	USA; Ret	JPN; 7		7th	20
1977	Ligier Gitanes	Ligier JS7	Matra MS73 3.0 V12 Matra MS76 3.0 V12	ARG; NC	BRA; Ret	RSA; Ret	USW; 9	ESP; 7	MON; 7	BEL; Ret	SWE; 1	FRA; 8	GBR; 6	GER; Ret	AUT; Ret	NED; 2	ITA; 8	USA; 7	CAN; Ret	JPN; 5	10th	18
1978	Ligier Gitanes	Ligier JS7	Matra MS76 3.0 V12	ARG; 16	BRA; 9		USW; 5														8th	19
1978	Ligier Gitanes	Ligier JS7/9	Matra MS78 3.0 V12			RSA; 5			BEL; 5		SWE; 7										8th	19
1978	Ligier Gitanes	Ligier JS9	Matra MS78 3.0 V12					MON; Ret		ESP; 3		FRA; 7	GBR; 10	GER; 3	AUT; 5	NED; 8	ITA; 4	USA; 11	CAN; Ret		8th	19
1979	Ligier Gitanes	Ligier JS11	Ford Cosworth DFV 3.0 V8	**ARG**; 1	**BRA**; 1	RSA; Ret	USW; Ret	**ESP**; Ret	**BEL**; 2	MON; Ret	FRA; 8	GBR; Ret	GER; 3	AUT; 3	NED; 3	ITA; Ret	CAN; Ret	USA; Ret			4th	36
1980	Équipe Ligier Gitanes	Ligier JS11/15	Ford Cosworth DFV 3.0 V8	ARG; Ret	BRA; Ret	RSA; 2	USW; Ret	BEL; 11	MON; 2	**FRA**; 3	GBR; Ret	GER; 1	AUT; 4	NED; 3	ITA; 9	CAN; 8†	USA; 5				4th	34
1981	Équipe Talbot Gitanes	Talbot Ligier JS17	Matra MS81 3.0 V12	USW; Ret	BRA; 6	ARG; Ret	SMR; Ret	BEL; 2	MON; 3	**ESP**; 2	FRA; Ret	GBR; 3	GER; 3	AUT; 1	NED; Ret	ITA; Ret	CAN; 1	CPL; 6			4th	44
1982	Équipe Talbot Gitanes	Talbot Ligier JS17B	Matra MS81 3.0 V12	RSA; Ret	BRA; Ret	USW; Ret	SMR	BEL; 9		DET; 6	CAN; Ret										17th	5
1982	Équipe Talbot Gitanes	Talbot Ligier JS19	Matra MS81 3.0 V12						MON; Ret			NED; Ret	GBR; Ret	FRA; 14	GER; Ret	AUT; 3	SUI; Ret	ITA; Ret	CPL; Ret		17th	5
1983	TAG Williams Team	Williams FW08C	Ford Cosworth DFV 3.0 V8	BRA; 4	USW; 4	FRA; 6	SMR; 7	MON; Ret	BEL; 6	DET; 5	CAN; Ret	GBR; 12	GER; 6	AUT; Ret	NED; Ret	ITA; DNQ	EUR; DNQ				11th	11
1983	TAG Williams Team	Williams FW09	Honda RA163-E 1.5 V6 t															RSA; Ret			11th	11
1984	Williams Grand Prix Engineering	Williams FW09	Honda RA163E 1.5 V6 t	BRA; Ret	RSA; Ret	BEL; Ret	SMR; Ret	FRA; 8	MON; 8	CAN; Ret	DET; 5	DAL; 4									14th	5
1984	Williams Grand Prix Engineering	Williams FW09B	Honda RA164E 1.5 V6 t										GBR; Ret	GER; Ret	AUT; Ret	NED; Ret	ITA; Ret	EUR; Ret	POR; 14		14th	5
1985	Équipe Ligier	Ligier JS25	Renault EF4B 1.5 V6 t	BRA; 6	POR; Ret	SMR; Ret	MON; 6														9th	16
1985	Équipe Ligier Gitanes	Ligier JS25	Renault EF4B 1.5 V6 t					CAN; 8	DET; 12	FRA; Ret	GBR; 3	GER; 3	AUT; Ret	NED; Ret	ITA; Ret	BEL; 11	EUR; Ret	RSA	AUS; 2		9th	16
1986	Équipe Ligier	Ligier JS27	Renault EF4B 1.5 V6 t	BRA; 3	ESP; Ret	SMR; Ret	MON; 6	BEL; 5	CAN; 7	DET; 2	FRA; 6	GBR; Ret	GER	HUN	AUT	ITA	POR	MEX	AUS		8th	14

=== Complete World Touring Car Championship results ===
(key) (Races in bold indicate pole position) (Races in italics indicate fastest lap)

Year	Team	Car	1	2	3	4	5	6	7	8	9	10	11	DC	Points
1987	Alfa Corse	Alfa Romeo 75	MNZ	JAR; Ret	DIJ ovr:9 cls:5	NUR ovr:9 cls:7	SPA ovr:12 cls:9	BNO ovr:10 cls:8	SIL ovr:10 cls:8	BAT	CAL	WEL	FJI	17th	86

* Overall race position shown. Registered WTCC points paying position may differ.

=== Complete Deutsche Tourenwagen Meisterschaft results ===
(key) (Races in bold indicate pole position) (Races in italics indicate fastest lap)

Year	Team	Car	1	2	3	4	5	6	7	8	9	10	11	12	13	14	15	16	17	18	19	20	21	22	23	24	Pos.	Pts
1990	Bigazzi M Team	BMW M3 Sport Evo	ZOL; 1; 6	ZOL; 2; 4	HOC; 1 Ret	HOC; 2 DNS	NÜR; 1; 3	NÜR; 2 Ret	AVU; 1; 4	AVU; 2 Ret	MFA; 1; 7	MFA; 2 Ret	WUN; 1; 14	WUN; 2 Ret	NÜR; 1; 1	NÜR; 2; 8	NOR; 1; 8	NOR; 2 Ret	DIE; 1; 18	DIE; 2; 4	NÜR; 1; 2	NÜR; 2; 6	HOC; 1; 14	HOC; 2; 5			7th	107
1991	Snobeck S.A.	Mercedes 190E 2.5-16 Evo2	ZOL; 1; 21	ZOL; 2 Ret	HOC; 1; 5	HOC; 2; 9	NÜR; 1; 5	NÜR; 2; 6	AVU; 1; 15	AVU; 2; 21	WUN; 1; 4	WUN; 2; 5	NOR; 1; 13	NOR; 2; 8	**DIE**; **1**; 3	DIE; 2 Ret	NÜR; 1; 3	NÜR; 2; 3	ALE; 1 DNS	ALE; 2 DNS	HOC; 1; 12	HOC; 2; 12	BRN; 1; 13	BRN; 2 Ret	DON; 1; 5	DON; 2; 7	11th	81
1992	MS Racing	Mercedes 190E 2.5-16 Evo2	ZOL; 1; 9	ZOL; 2; 14	NÜR; 1; 18	NÜR; 2; 10	WUN; 1; 8	WUN; 2; 6	AVU; 1; 9	AVU; 2; 4	HOC; 1; 7	HOC; 2; 6	NÜR; 1; 11	NÜR; 2; 9	NOR; 1; 11	NOR; 2; 11	BRN; 1 Ret	BRN; 2; 13	DIE; 1; 18	DIE; 2; 8	ALE; 1; 10	ALE; 2; 8	NÜR; 1 Ret	NÜR; 2 Ret	HOC; 1 Ret	HOC; 2 DNS	13th	43

=== Complete Grand Prix Masters results ===
(key) Races in bold indicate pole position, races in italics indicate fastest lap.

Year	Team	Chassis	Engine	1
2005	Team GMF	Delta Motorsport GPM	Nicholson McLaren 3.5 V8	RSA; Ret

== Other results ==
- 800 km of Dijon: 1st, 1975
- 1000 km of Monza: 1st, 1975
- 1000 km of Nürburgring: 1st, 1975
- 500 km of Monza: 1st, 1988 (class win)
- 500 km of Nürburgring: 1st, 1988 (class win)
- 3 hours of Zhuhai: 1st, 1994

== See also ==
- Formula One drivers from France

Sporting positions
Preceded by Michel Leclèrel	Critérium de Formule Renault; Champion; 1972	Succeeded by Christian Debias
Preceded by Patrick Depailler	Monaco Formula Three; Race Winner; 1973	Succeeded by Tom Pryce
Preceded by Michel Leclère	French Formula Three; Champion; 1973	Succeeded by Alain Prost (1979)
Preceded by Patrick Depailler	European Formula Two; Champion; 1975	Succeeded by Jean-Pierre Jabouille
Records
Preceded by Graham Hill; 179 entries, 176 starts (1958 – 1975)	Most Grand Prix entries 180 entries, 176 starts (1974 – 1986), 180th entry at the 1986 British GP	Succeeded by Riccardo Patrese; 257 entries (256 starts), 181st entry at the 1989 Mexican GP
