= 1978 Spanish Grand Prix =

- Race 7 of 16 in the 1978 Formula One season

Race details
- Date: 4 June 1978
- Official name: XXIV Gran Premio de España
- Location: Jarama, Spain
- Course: Permanent racing facility
- Course length: 3.404 km (2.115 miles)
- Distance: 75 laps, 255.3 km (158.625 miles)
- Weather: Dry

Pole position
Driver	(United States) Mario Andretti	Lotus-Ford
- Time: 1:16.39

Fastest lap
Driver	(United States) Mario Andretti	Lotus-Ford
- Time: 1:20.06 on lap 5

Podium
First	(United States) Mario Andretti	Lotus-Ford
Second	(Sweden) Ronnie Peterson	Lotus-Ford
Third	(France) Jacques Laffite	Ligier-Matra

The 1978 Spanish Grand Prix was a Formula One motor race held on 4 June 1978 at Jarama. It was the seventh race of the 1978 World Championship of F1 Drivers and the 1978 International Cup for F1 Constructors. The 75-lap race was won from pole position by Mario Andretti, driving a Lotus-Ford, with teammate Ronnie Peterson second and Jacques Laffite third in a Ligier-Matra.

== Report ==
Once again the new Lotus 79 demonstrated its speed, with Mario Andretti on pole and Ronnie Peterson alongside him on the front row, the Swede driving the 79 for the first time. Carlos Reutemann was third in his Ferrari, with James Hunt fourth in his McLaren.

On race day, Hunt made a fast start to lead into the first corner from Andretti and Reutemann, with Peterson dropping to ninth. Andretti re-passed Hunt on lap 6 and then started to pull away. Reutemann ran third until he had to pit for tyres, and so John Watson inherited third until he was passed by Jacques Laffite, but soon the recovering Peterson passed both of them. Hunt now suffered from tyre problems and he also began to drop back, and so Peterson moved into second with Laffite third. This was how it stayed to the end, Andretti winning from Peterson in another Lotus 1–2, and Laffite taking the final spot on the podium. Reutemann had a huge accident on lap 58 when his Ferrari flew 8 feet in the air, cleared the barrier and landed in the debris fencing.

== Classification ==
=== Pre-qualifying ===
Pos.	Driver	Constructor	Time/Gap
1	(Mexico) Héctor Rebaque	Lotus–Ford	1:19.84
2	(West Germany) Rolf Stommelen	Arrows–Ford	+0.13
3	(Italy) Arturo Merzario	Merzario–Ford	+0.19
4	(United States) Brett Lunger	McLaren–Ford	+0.35
5	(Finland) Keke Rosberg	Theodore–Ford	+1.41

*Positions in red indicate entries that failed to pre-qualify.

=== Qualifying ===
Pos.	Driver	Constructor	Time/Gap
1	(United States) Mario Andretti	Lotus–Ford	1:16.39
2	(Sweden) Ronnie Peterson	Lotus–Ford	+0.29
3	(Argentina) Carlos Reutemann	Ferrari	+1.01
4	(United Kingdom) James Hunt	McLaren–Ford	+1.27
5	(Canada) Gilles Villeneuve	Ferrari	+1.40
6	(Austria) Niki Lauda	Brabham–Alfa Romeo	+1.55
7	(United Kingdom) John Watson	Brabham–Alfa Romeo	+1.59
8	(Italy) Riccardo Patrese	Arrows–Ford	+1.75
9	(South Africa) Jody Scheckter	Wolf–Ford	+1.85
10	(France) Jacques Laffite	Ligier–Matra	+2.03
11	(France) Jean-Pierre Jabouille	Renault	+2.60
12	(France) Patrick Depailler	Tyrrell–Ford	+2.67
13	(France) Didier Pironi	Tyrrell–Ford	+2.72
14	(France) Patrick Tambay	McLaren–Ford	+2.89
15	(Brazil) Emerson Fittipaldi	Fittipaldi–Ford	+2.94
16	(Italy) Vittorio Brambilla	Surtees–Ford	+3.32
17	(West Germany) Jochen Mass	ATS–Ford	+3.59
18	(Australia) Alan Jones	Williams–Ford	+3.60
19	(West Germany) Rolf Stommelen	Arrows–Ford	+3.64
20	(Mexico) Héctor Rebaque	Lotus–Ford	+3.82
21	(Belgium) Jacky Ickx	Ensign–Ford	+3.97
22	(Switzerland) Clay Regazzoni	Shadow–Ford	+4.28
23	(United Kingdom) Rupert Keegan	Surtees–Ford	+4.38
24	(West Germany) Hans-Joachim Stuck	Shadow–Ford	+4.48
25	(Italy) Arturo Merzario	Merzario–Ford	+4.52
26	(United States) Brett Lunger	McLaren–Ford	+4.78
27	(Spain) Emilio de Villota	McLaren–Ford	+5.16
28	(Italy) Alberto Colombo	ATS–Ford	+5.20

*Positions in red indicate entries that failed to qualify.

=== Race ===
Pos	No	Driver	Constructor	Tyre	Laps	Time/Retired	Grid	Points
1	5	(United States) Mario Andretti	Lotus-Ford	G	75	1:41:47.06	1	9
2	6	(Sweden) Ronnie Peterson	Lotus-Ford	G	75	+ 19.56	2	6
3	26	(France) Jacques Laffite	Ligier-Matra	G	75	+ 37.24	10	4
4	20	(South Africa) Jody Scheckter	Wolf-Ford	G	75	+ 1:00.06	9	3
5	2	(United Kingdom) John Watson	Brabham-Alfa Romeo	G	75	+ 1:05.93	7	2
6	7	(United Kingdom) James Hunt	McLaren-Ford	G	74	+ 1 Lap	4	1
7	19	(Italy) Vittorio Brambilla	Surtees-Ford	G	74	+ 1 Lap	16	
8	27	(Australia) Alan Jones	Williams-Ford	G	74	+ 1 Lap	18	
9	9	(West Germany) Jochen Mass	ATS-Ford	G	74	+ 1 Lap	17	
10	12	(Canada) Gilles Villeneuve	Ferrari	MI	74	+ 1 Lap	5	
11	18	(United Kingdom) Rupert Keegan	Surtees-Ford	G	73	+ 2 Laps	23	
12	3	(France) Didier Pironi	Tyrrell-Ford	G	71	+ 4 Laps	13	
13	15	(France) Jean-Pierre Jabouille	Renault	MI	71	+ 4 Laps	11	
14	36	(West Germany) Rolf Stommelen	Arrows-Ford	G	71	+ 4 Laps	19	
15	17	(Switzerland) Clay Regazzoni	Shadow-Ford	G	67	Fuel Pipe	22	
Ret	22	(Belgium) Jacky Ickx	Ensign-Ford	G	64	Engine	21	
Ret	14	(Brazil) Emerson Fittipaldi	Fittipaldi-Ford	G	62	Throttle	15	
Ret	11	(Argentina) Carlos Reutemann	Ferrari	MI	57	Accident	3	
Ret	1	(Austria) Niki Lauda	Brabham-Alfa Romeo	G	56	Engine	6	
Ret	4	(France) Patrick Depailler	Tyrrell-Ford	G	51	Engine	12	
Ret	16	(West Germany) Hans-Joachim Stuck	Shadow-Ford	G	45	Suspension	24	
Ret	35	(Italy) Riccardo Patrese	Arrows-Ford	G	21	Engine	8	
Ret	25	(Mexico) Héctor Rebaque	Lotus-Ford	G	21	Exhaust	20	
Ret	8	(France) Patrick Tambay	McLaren-Ford	G	16	Spun Off	14	
DNQ	37	(Italy) Arturo Merzario	Merzario-Ford	G				
DNQ	30	(United States) Brett Lunger	McLaren-Ford	G				
DNQ	28	(Spain) Emilio de Villota	McLaren-Ford	G				
DNQ	10	(Italy) Alberto Colombo	ATS-Ford	G				
DNPQ	32	(Finland) Keke Rosberg	Theodore-Ford	G				

== Notes ==
- This was the 5th win of the Spanish Grand Prix for Lotus and the 10th Spanish Grand Prix win for a Ford-powered car.

== Championship standings after the race ==
Drivers' Championship standings

	Pos	Driver	Points
	1	(United States) Mario Andretti	36
2	2	(Sweden) Ronnie Peterson	26
1	3	(France) Patrick Depailler	23
1	4	(Argentina) Carlos Reutemann	22
	5	(Austria) Niki Lauda	16

Constructors' Championship standings

	Pos	Constructor	Points
	1	(United Kingdom) Lotus-Ford	45
	2	(United Kingdom) Tyrrell-Ford	25
	3	(Italy) Ferrari	22
	4	(United Kingdom) Brabham-Alfa Romeo	22
1	5	(France) Ligier-Matra	10

- Note: Only the top five positions are included for both sets of standings.

Previous race: 1978 Belgian Grand Prix	FIA Formula One World Championship; 1978 season	Next race: 1978 Swedish Grand Prix
Previous race: 1977 Spanish Grand Prix	Spanish Grand Prix	Next race: 1979 Spanish Grand Prix
