= Shadow DN11 =

Formula One racing car

- Category: Formula One
- Constructor: Shadow Racing Cars
- Designers: Tony Southgate; John Baldwin
- Predecessor: DN9
- Successor: DN12

Technical specifications
- Chassis: Aluminium monocoque
- Axle track: Front: 1,631 mm (64.2 in); Rear: 1,641 mm (64.6 in)
- Wheelbase: 2,642 mm (104.0 in)
- Engine: Cosworth DFV 3.0 L (180 cu in) V8 NA mid-engined
- Transmission: Hewland FGA 400 5-speed manual
- Weight: 605 kg (1,334 lb)
- Fuel: Fina/Valvoline
- Tyres: Goodyear

Competition history
- Notable entrants: Shadow Racing Cars
- Notable drivers: (Sweden) Stefan Johansson; (United Kingdom) Geoff Lees; (Republic of Ireland) David Kennedy
- Debut: 1980 Argentine Grand Prix
Races	Wins	Poles	F/Laps
6	0	0	0
- Constructors' Championships: 0
- Drivers' Championships: 0

The Shadow DN11 was a Formula One car used by the Shadow team during the 1980 season. It was driven by Stefan Johansson, Geoff Lees, and David Kennedy. It was powered by the commonly used 3.0 L (180 cu in) Cosworth DFV V8 engine.

== Complete Formula One results ==
(key)

Year	Name	Engines	Tyres	Drivers	1	2	3	4	5	6	7	8	9	10	11	12	13	14	Points	WCC
1980	(United Kingdom) Theodore Shadow (United Kingdom) Shadow Cars	Cosworth DFV 3.0 V8	G		ARG	BRA	RSA	USW	BEL	MON	FRA	GBR	GER	AUT	NED	ITA	CAN	USA	0	NC
1980	(United Kingdom) Theodore Shadow (United Kingdom) Shadow Cars	Cosworth DFV 3.0 V8	G	(Sweden) Stefan Johansson	DNQ	DNQ													0	NC
1980	(United Kingdom) Theodore Shadow (United Kingdom) Shadow Cars	Cosworth DFV 3.0 V8	G	(United Kingdom) Geoff Lees			13	DNQ											0	NC
1980	(United Kingdom) Theodore Shadow (United Kingdom) Shadow Cars	Cosworth DFV 3.0 V8	G	(Republic of Ireland) David Kennedy	DNQ	DNQ	DNQ	DNQ	DNQ	DNQ									0	NC
