= Shadow DN12 =

Formula One racing car

- Category: Formula One
- Constructor: Shadow Racing Cars
- Designers: Tony Southgate; John Baldwin
- Predecessor: DN11

Technical specifications
- Chassis: Aluminium monocoque
- Axle track: Front: 1,631 mm (64.2 in); Rear: 1,641 mm (64.6 in)
- Wheelbase: 2,642 mm (104.0 in)
- Engine: Cosworth DFV 3.0 L (180 cu in) V8 NA mid-engined
- Transmission: Hewland FGA 400 5-speed manual
- Weight: 605 kg (1,334 lb)
- Fuel: Fina/Valvoline
- Tyres: Goodyear

Competition history
- Notable entrants: Shadow Racing Cars
- Notable drivers: (United Kingdom) Geoff Lees; (Republic of Ireland) David Kennedy
- Debut: 1980 Belgian Grand Prix
Races	Wins	Poles	F/Laps
3	0	0	0
- Constructors' Championships: 0
- Drivers' Championships: 0

The Shadow DN12 was a Formula One car used by the Shadow team for the 1980 season, and was their last Formula One car chassis and entry. It was driven by Geoff Lees, and David Kennedy. It was powered by the commonly used 3.0 L (180 cu in) Cosworth DFV V8 engine. It only entered three races, making its debut at the 1980 Belgian Grand Prix. At the French Grand Prix that year, both drivers, Geoff Lees and David Kennedy failed to qualify, after which Shadow retired from Formula One permanently.

== French Grand Prix ==
This race also saw the final appearance of Shadow Racing Cars. Geoff Lees and David Kennedy were 25th and 27th in qualifying in the Shadow DN12s meaning both drivers missed the 24-car grid. The team had been sold only two months previously to Macau-based businessman and motor racing team owner Teddy Yip. Yip's own race team Theodore Racing would emerge as a Formula One team in 1981.

== Complete Formula One results ==
(key)

Year	Name	Engines	Tyres	Drivers	1	2	3	4	5	6	7	8	9	10	11	12	13	14	Points	WCC
1980	(United Kingdom) Theodore Shadow	Cosworth DFV 3.0 V8	G		ARG	BRA	RSA	USW	BEL	MON	FRA	GBR	GER	AUT	NED	ITA	CAN	USA	0	NC
1980	(United Kingdom) Theodore Shadow	Cosworth DFV 3.0 V8	G	(United Kingdom) Geoff Lees					DNQ	DNQ	DNQ								0	NC
1980	(United Kingdom) Theodore Shadow	Cosworth DFV 3.0 V8	G	(Republic of Ireland) David Kennedy							DNQ								0	NC
