= David Kennedy (racing driver) =

Irish racing driver (born 1953)

- Born: David Paul Kennedy; 15 January 1953 (age 73); Sligo, Ireland

Formula One World Championship career
- Nationality: (Republic of Ireland) Irish
- Active years: 1980
- Team: Shadow
- Entries: 7 (0 starts)
- Championships: 0
- Wins: 0
- Podiums: 0
- Career points: 0
- Pole positions: 0
- Fastest laps: 0
- First entry: 1980 Argentine Grand Prix
- Last entry: 1980 French Grand Prix

24 Hours of Le Mans career
- Years: 1983–1991
- Teams: Peer Racing; Mazdaspeed
- Best finish: 6th (1991)
- Class wins: 3 (1987, 1988, 1989)

David Paul Kennedy (born 15 January 1953) is a former racing driver from the Republic of Ireland. He was one of his country's first Grand Prix drivers, and is widely seen as having helped pioneer the Irish move into international racing.

Kennedy has been a driver manager, a Formula One TV analyst, a shareholder with championship-winning single seater race teams and a board member at Ireland's Mondello Park Race Circuit.

== Biography ==
Kennedy was in the vanguard of a wave of 1970s Irish international racing talent and became Ireland's first winner of a British single seater championship when he won the RAC British Formula Ford Championship and Townsend Thoresen Formula Ford 1600 Championships in 1976 driving a Crossle-Minister 30F. He also finished a close second in the European FF1600 series that year. In 1977, he graduated to the factory supported AFMP March European Formula 3 team but the squad folded early in the year and Kennedy soon switched to the small Argo team, scoring a number of giant killing results with the Jo Marquart designed JM1 chassis.

Kennedy finished sixth in the series in 1978 but switched to the British Formula One series before the end of the year scoring a win on his debut with a Theodore Racing run Wolf WR3 at Snetterton. He finished runner-up in the British F1 Championship in 1979 which helped him to move into Grand Prix racing with the Shadow team in 1980. However, the team was chronically underfunded and had a poorly engineered DN11 chassis. Teddy Yip of Theodore Racing fame took over ownership of the team after a few races but a new DN12 design turned out to be a similar disappointment. Kennedy did qualify and race in the 1980 Spanish Grand Prix, an event subsequently stripped of its World Championship status.

After a part season of North American Can Am racing in 1981 with a Frissbee chassis, Kennedy returned to Europe and went on to forge a successful career in sportscar racing, latterly with the factory Mazdaspeed team with whom he raced extensively at Le Mans, Japan and the world sportscar championship in a series of iconic class winning rotary-powered machines. Kennedy enjoyed prominence as a member of the exclusive club of professional drivers earning a living in Japan's lucrative early ‘90s racing scene. He began to move into driver management before his career behind the wheel ended and was responsible for booking the driver team of Johnny Herbert, Volker Weidler and Bertrand Gachot that took Mazda's, and Japan's, breakthrough victory at Le Mans in 1991. He himself finished sixth overall with former F1 and F3 team-mate Stefan Johansson, and Maurizio Sandro Sala in that famous edition of Le Mans which preceded a full-time move into driver management when his career behind the wheel came to an end in 1994. Among the drivers Kennedy aided in their single seater careers are ex-Jordan Grand Prix F1 driver and Formula Nippon champion Ralph Firman, Formula Nippon Champion Richard Lyons, Formula Palmer Audi Champion and Indy Lights second runner-up Damien Faulkner, all of whom went on to have successful careers in GT and sportscar racing.

During this period, Kennedy developed a career as TV analyst in Formula One racing beginning as permanent co-commentator alongside Peter Collins on RTÉ in Ireland from 1995 to 2003 after which he sat alongside Declan Quigley at F1 races for Setanta Sports from 2004 until 2009.

Kennedy has had a regular opinion column with the Sunday Independent newspaper for many years, earning a reputation as an incisive analyst with a quirky, lateral view of proceedings in F1 racing.

Kennedy has always retained a deep interest in club racing and since 1986 has been a director of the Mondello Park race circuit where he began his career in the early 1970s, sitting on the board of the circuit freehold company controlled by former Lola boss Martin Birrane.

Kennedy was part of the consortium that took control of the Ireland team in the A1GP World Cup of Motorsport in 2006. The team became the final series champions in 2008/09 with Adam Carroll behind the wheel after which the Ireland team moved into the new GP3 series in 2009 as Status Grand Prix. Team principal of Status Motorsport is Teddy Yip Junior whose father Teddy Yip owned the Theodore and Shadow F1 teams that Kennedy raced for from 1978 to 1980.

Kennedy has other business interests outside motorsport. His wife Fiona, with whom he has three children, is herself a former Formula Ford racer.

== Racing record ==
=== Complete Formula One World Championship results ===
(key)

Year	Entrant	Chassis	Engine	1	2	3	4	5	6	7	8	9	10	11	12	13	14	WDC	Points
1980	Shadow Cars	Shadow DN11	Cosworth V8	ARG; DNQ	BRA; DNQ	RSA; DNQ	USW; DNQ	BEL; DNQ										NC	0
1980	Theodore Shadow	Shadow DN11	Cosworth V8						MON; DNQ									NC	0
1980	Theodore Shadow	Shadow DN12	Cosworth V8							FRA; DNQ	GBR	GER	AUT	NED	ITA	CAN	USA	NC	0

=== Complete Formula One Non-Championship results ===
(key)

Year	Entrant	Chassis	Engine	1	2	3
1979	Theodore Racing Hong Kong	Wolf WR4	Cosworth V8	ROC; DNS	GNM	DIN
1980	Theodore Shadow	Shadow DN12	Cosworth V8	ESP; Ret		

=== Complete British Saloon Car Championship results ===
(key) (Races in bold indicate pole position; races in italics indicate fastest lap.)

Year	Team	Car	Class	1	2	3	4	5	6	7	8	9	10	11	Pos.	Pts	Class
1984	Grundig International / BS Automotive	BMW 635CSi	A	DON	SIL; NC	OUL; DNS	THR ovr:5 cls:5	THR ovr:6 cls:6	SIL ovr:10 cls:10	SNE ovr:3 cls:3	BRH ovr:7 cls:6	BRH ovr:17 cls:8	DON; Ret	SIL ovr:5 cls:5	18th	10	6th

=== Complete 24 Hours of Le Mans results ===
Year	Team	Co-Drivers	Car	Class	Laps	Pos.	Class Pos.
1983	(United Kingdom) Peer Racing	(France) François Migault (Republic of Ireland) Martin Birrane	Ford C100	C	16	DNF	DNF
1984	(Japan) Mazdaspeed Co. Ltd.	(Belgium) Philippe Martin (Belgium) Jean-Michel Martin	Mazda 727C	C2	291	19th	4th
1985	(Japan) Mazdaspeed Co. Ltd.	(Belgium) Philippe Martin (Belgium) Jean-Michel Martin	Mazda 737C	C2	283	19th	3rd
1986	(Japan) Mazdaspeed Co. Ltd.	(Belgium) Pierre Dieudonné (Republic of Ireland) Mark Galvin	Mazda 757	GTP	137	DNF	DNF
1987	(Japan) Mazdaspeed Co. Ltd.	(Belgium) Pierre Dieudonné (Republic of Ireland) Mark Galvin	Mazda 757	GTP	319	7th	1st
1988	(Japan) Mazdaspeed Co. Ltd.	(Japan) Yojiro Terada (Belgium) Pierre Dieudonné	Mazda 757	GTP	337	15th	1st
1989	(Japan) Mazdaspeed Co. Ltd.	(Belgium) Pierre Dieudonné (United Kingdom) Chris Hodgetts	Mazda 767B	GTP	368	7th	1st
1990	(Japan) Mazdaspeed Co. Ltd.	(Sweden) Stefan Johansson (Belgium) Pierre Dieudonné	Mazda 787	GTP	147	DNF	DNF
1991	(Japan) Mazdaspeed Co. Ltd. (France) Oreca	(Sweden) Stefan Johansson (Brazil) Maurizio Sandro Sala	Mazda 787B	C2	355	6th	6th
