= Ricardo Zunino =

Argentine racing driver (born 1949)

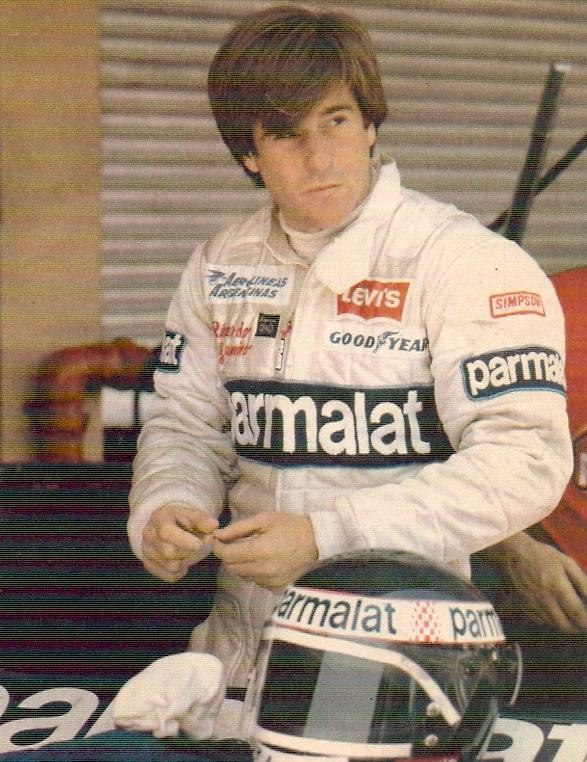
- Born: Ricardo Héctor Zunino; 13 April 1949 (age 77); San Juan, Argentina

Formula One World Championship career
- Nationality: (Argentina) Argentine
- Active years: 1979 - 1981
- Team(s): Brabham, Tyrrell
- Entries: 11 (10 starts)
- Championships: 0
- Wins: 0
- Podiums: 0
- Career points: 0
- Pole positions: 0
- Fastest laps: 0
- First entry: 1979 Canadian Grand Prix
- Last entry: 1981 Argentine Grand Prix

Ricardo Héctor Zunino (born 13 April 1949) is an Argentine retired racing driver who participated in Formula One from 1979 to 1981. He competed in 11 World Championship races and two non-Championship Formula One races, the 1980 Spanish Grand Prix and 1981 South African Grand Prix. In Argentina, Zunino was two-time Turismo Nacional Champion, with Fiat.

At the 1979 Canadian Grand Prix, Zunino replaced Niki Lauda at Brabham after the Austrian abruptly quit the team and Formula One. Zunino, attending the race as a spectator on a weekend off from his regular British F1 Championship drive, was chosen to take over the seat, having recently tested for the team. After the 1980 French Grand Prix he was replaced by Héctor Rebaque.

== Racing record ==
=== Complete European Formula Two Championship results ===
(key) (Races in bold indicate pole position; races in italics indicate fastest lap)

Year	Entrant	Chassis	Engine	1	2	3	4	5	6	7	8	9	10	11	12	13	Pos.	Pts
1977	AFMP Euroracing	March 772	Hart	SIL	THR; 9	HOC; Ret	NÜR; 14										20th	1
1977	March Engineering	March 772	Hart					VLL; 11	PAU; 6	MUG; Ret	ROU; 10	NOG; Ret	PER; Ret	MIS; Ret	EST; DNQ	DON; Ret	20th	1
1978	March Engineering	March 782	BMW	THR; 14	HOC; Ret	NÜR; 13	PAU; Ret	MUG; 18	VLL; 6	ROU; 5	DON; 9	NOG; DNS	PER; 5	MIS; 7	HOC; 5		12th	7
1979	Polifac BMW Junior Team	March 792	BMW	SIL; 9	HOC; Ret	THR; Ret	NÜR; 10	VLL	MUG	PAU	HOC	ZAN	PER	MIS	DON		NC	0

=== Complete British Formula One Championship results ===
(key) (note: results shown in bold indicate pole position; results in italics indicate fastest lap)

Year	Entrant	Chassis	Engine	1	2	3	4	5	6	7	8	9	10	11	12	13	14	15	Pos.	Pts
1979	BS Fabrications	McLaren M23	Ford Cosworth DFV 3.0 V8	ZOL	OUL	BRH	MAL	SNE	THR; 5										6th	39
1979	BS Fabrications	Arrows A1	Ford Cosworth DFV 3.0 V8							ZAN; Ret									6th	39
1979	Charles Clowes Racing	Arrows A1	Ford Cosworth DFV 3.0 V8								DON; 4	OUL; Ret	**NOG**; 7	MAL; 2	BRH; 1	**THR**; 2	SNE; 2	SIL	6th	39

=== Complete Formula One World Championship results ===
(key) (Races in bold indicate pole position / Races in italics indicate fastest lap)

Year	Entrant	Chassis	Engine	1	2	3	4	5	6	7	8	9	10	11	12	13	14	15	WDC	Pts
1979	Parmalat Racing	Brabham BT49	Ford Cosworth DFV 3.0 V8	ARG	BRA	RSA	USW	ESP	BEL	MON	FRA	GBR	GER	AUT	NED	ITA	CAN; 7	USA; Ret	NC	0
1980	Parmalat Racing	Brabham BT49	Ford Cosworth DFV 3.0 V8	ARG; 7	BRA; 8	RSA; 10	USW; Ret	BEL; Ret	MON; DNQ	FRA; Ret	GBR	GER	AUT	NED	ITA	CAN	USA		NC	0
1981	Tyrrell Racing Team	Tyrrell 010	Ford Cosworth DFV 3.0 V8	USW	BRA; 13	ARG; 13	SMR	BEL	MON	ESP	FRA	GBR	GER	AUT	NED	ITA	CAN	CPL	NC	0

=== Complete WRC results ===
Year	Entrant	Car	1	2	3	4	5	6	7	8	9	10	11	12	WDC	Pts
1981	Team Datsun Europe	Datsun 160J	MON	SWE	POR	KEN	FRA	GRC	ARG; Ret	BRA	FIN	ITA	CIV	GBR	NC	0
