= Jean-Pierre Jabouille =

French racing driver (1942–2023)

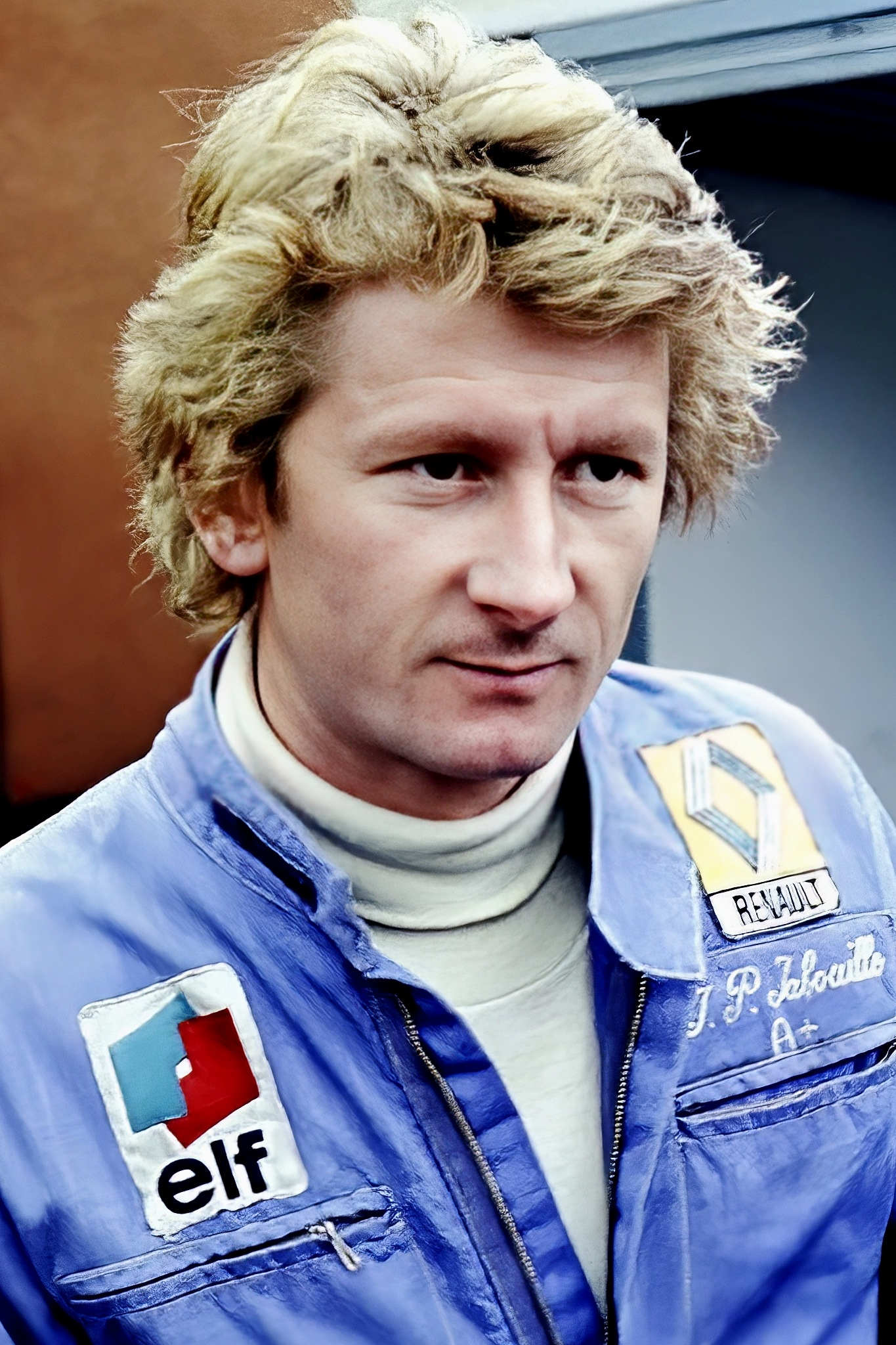
- Jabouille in 1975
- Born: Jean-Pierre Alain Jabouille; 1 October 1942; Paris, France
- Died: 2 February 2023 (aged 80); Saint-Cloud, Hauts-de-Seine, France
- Spouse: Geneviève Cottin (m. 1974; div. 1997)
- Children: 1
- Relatives: Jacques Laffite (brother-in-law)

Formula One World Championship career
- Nationality: (France) French
- Active years: 1974–1975, 1977–1981
- Team(s): Frank Williams, Surtees, Tyrrell, Renault, Ligier
- Entries: 55 (49 starts)
- Championships: 0
- Wins: 2
- Podiums: 2
- Career points: 21
- Pole positions: 6
- Fastest laps: 0
- First entry: 1974 French Grand Prix
- First win: 1979 French Grand Prix
- Last win: 1980 Austrian Grand Prix
- Last entry: 1981 Spanish Grand Prix

24 Hours of Le Mans career
- Years: 1968–1970, 1972–1974, 1976–1978, 1989, 1991–1993
- Teams: Alpine, Matra, Renault, Sauber, Peugeot
- Best finish: 3rd (1973, 1974, 1992, 1993)
- Class wins: 0

Jean-Pierre Alain Jabouille (1 October 1942 – 2 February 2023) was a French racing driver and engineer, who competed in Formula One from 1974 to 1981. Jabouille won two Formula One Grands Prix across seven seasons.

Jabouille raced in 55 Formula One Grands Prix, collecting two wins during the first years of Renault's turbocharged programme in the late 1970s and early 1980s. Jabouille also raced the 24 Hours of Le Mans from the late 1960s to the early 1990s, driving for Alpine, Matra, Sauber, and Peugeot and collecting four third-place overall finishes in 1973, 1974, 1992, and 1993.

== Early and personal life ==
Jean-Pierre Alain Jabouille was born on 1 October 1942 in Paris, then occupied by Nazi Germany. He was of Creusois descent through his father, Robert Jabouille (1899–1967), an architect for the City of Paris who co-designed the current (third) Pont de Grenelle and the Allée des Cygnes. Jabouille briefly studied fine arts at the Sorbonne before turning to motorsport, and went on to qualify as an engineer.

Jabouille met his future racing partner and brother-in-law Jacques Laffite as a child, at a roller-skating rink in Paris, when Jabouille was twelve and Laffite eleven. In 1974, Jabouille married Geneviève Cottin; the couple divorced in 1997. Three years later, Laffite married Geneviève's sister, Bernadette Cottin. Jabouille's son, Victor, also became a racing driver, competing in single-seater and historic motorsport.

== Career ==
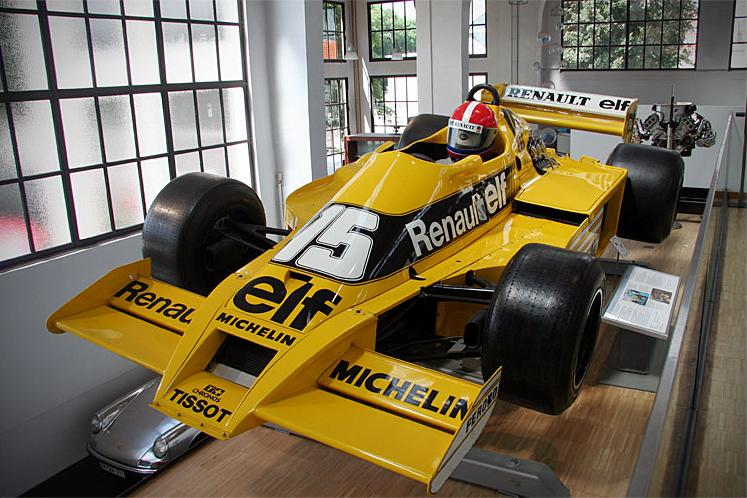
Jabouille's Renault RS01 and helmet on display at the Deutsches Museum

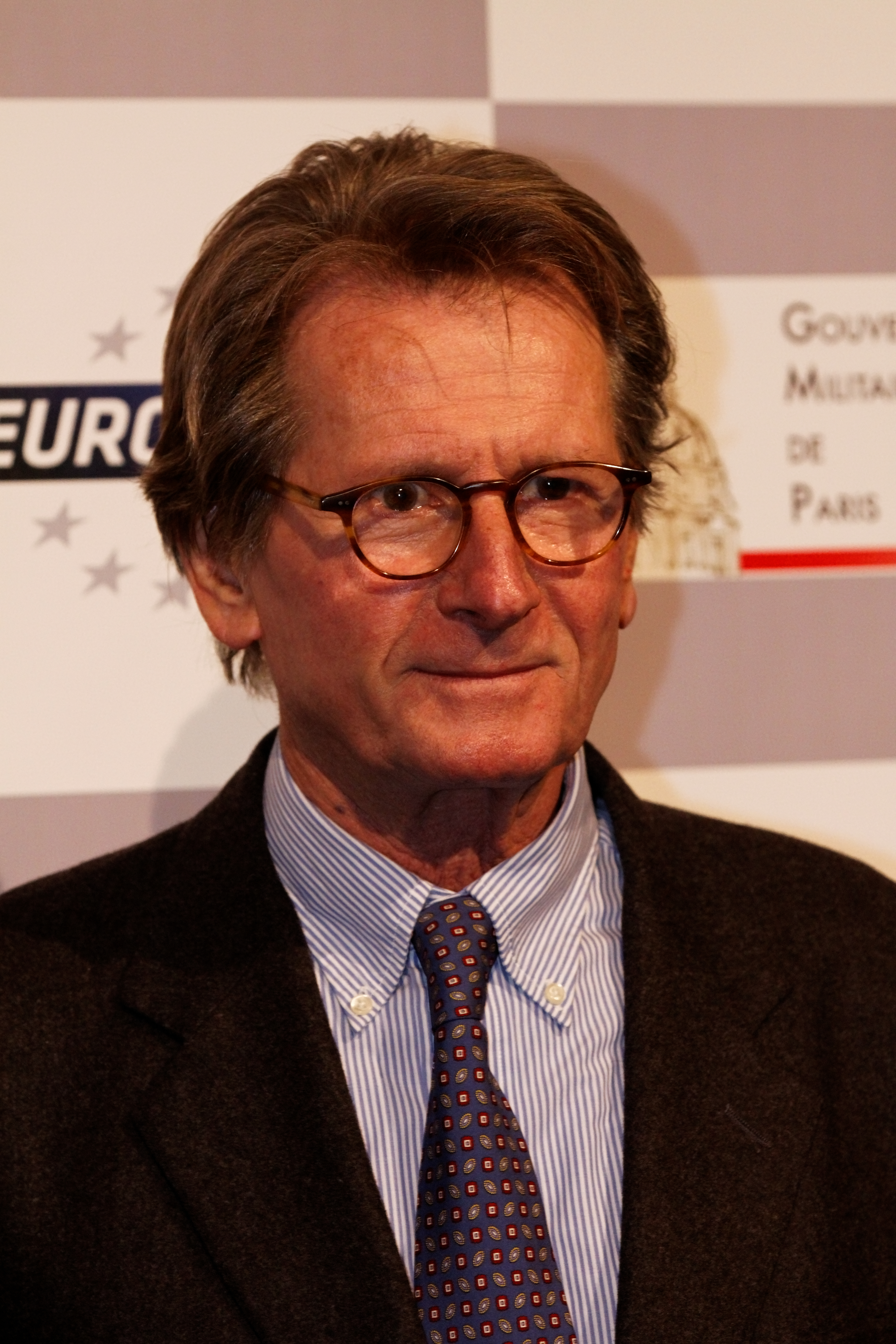
Jabouille in 2012

Jabouille first made his mark in French Formula Three in 1967, and continued in 1968, maintaining the car himself on his way to the runner up spot behind François Cevert. For 1969, he was contracted as a development driver by Alpine, having several disjointed runs in Formula Two and sports cars. In 1973, he co-drove a Matra to third at the Le Mans 24 Hours, and repeated this feat in 1974, when he also won the Formula neo race at Hockenheim, and finished as runner-up in the European 2-litre series for Alpine. He also made his first appearances in Formula One, failing to qualify an Iso–Marlboro at the French Grand Prix, and a Surtees at the Austrian Grand Prix.

1975 saw Jabouille sever his ties with Alpine, and gain Elf backing to make his own Formula Two chassis. He finished runner-up to Jacques Laffite, but finally made his full Grand Prix debut, finishing 12th in a works Tyrrell at the French Grand Prix. For 1976, he concentrated on Formula Two, finally winning the title.

=== Formula One ===
Jabouille was signed up by Formula One team Renault to develop their new 1.5l turbocharged engine for 1977. The RS01 car debuted at the 1977 British Grand Prix, but initially the turbo engine (a first for Formula One) was fragile and suffered from severe turbo lag, making it difficult to drive on tight circuits. However, Jabouille, who was an engineer by trade persevered and developed the RS01 throughout, recording several notable qualifying positions in 1978, and landed the marque's first points with fourth place at the United States Grand Prix East at Watkins Glen, a circuit particularly tough on fuel consumption- one of the Renault turbo's biggest weaknesses.

1979 saw Renault expand to run a second car for René Arnoux. Jabouille secured Renault's first Formula One pole at the South African Grand Prix, and then won their first victory, fittingly at the French Grand Prix, also from pole. This was the first victory for a turbocharged car in Formula One. He took two more poles, at the German and Italian Grands Prix, but poor reliability meant the win was his only score.

In 1980, Jabouille took two more poles and another win at the Austrian Grand Prix. A suspension failure in the Canadian Grand Prix caused a sizeable accident, which left him with a broken leg, just after he had signed with Ligier for 1981. His injuries saw him sit out the first two races of the 1981 season, but it soon became clear he was not fully fit, failing to qualify for two of his four attempts, at which point he decided to retire from Formula One. Subsequently, he stayed with Ligier and became team manager in 1982. In 1984, he transferred to Ligier's joint entry with Curb Racing in the 1984 CART series, as team manager.

=== Sportscars ===
Jabouille returned to racing in the mid-1980s, driving in the French Supertouring Championship before joining Peugeot to help develop their sports car programme at the 24 Hours of Le Mans. This culminated in third places for the marque in both the 1992 and 1993 races. In 1994, he succeeded Jean Todt as director of Peugeot Sport, but unsuccessful seasons for Peugeot as engine suppliers in Formula One with McLaren and Jordan saw him sacked in 1995. Following that, he ran his own sports car team in the ISRS.

== Death ==
Jabouille died on 2 February 2023 at the age of 80.

== Racing record ==
=== Career summary ===
Season	Series	Team	Races	Wins	Poles	F/Laps	Podiums	Points	Position
1968	European Formula Two	Matra Sports	1	0	0	0	0	0	NC
1968	24 Hours of Le Mans	Société des Automobiles Alpine	1	0	0	0	0	0	NC
1969	24 Hours of Le Mans	Société des Automobiles Alpine	2	0	0	0	0	0	NC
1970	European Formula Two	Constructions Mécaniques Pygmée	2	0	0	0	0	2	16th
1970	24 Hours of Le Mans	Equipe Matra-Simca	1	0	0	0	0	N/A	DNF
1971	European Formula Two	Equipe Tecno Elf	1	0	0	0	0	0	NC
1972	European Formula Two	Elf John Coombs	8	0	0	0	1	7	14th
1972	24 Hours of Le Mans	Équipe Matra-Simca Shell	1	0	0	0	0	N/A	DNF
1973	European Formula Two	Elf John Coombs	5	0	0	0	0	3	24th
1973	24 Hours of Le Mans	Équipe Matra-Simca Shell	1	0	0	0	1	N/A	**3rd**
1974	European Formula Two	Ecurie Elf	7	1	1	3	3	20	4th
1974	World Sportscar Championship	Équipe Gitanes	2	0	0	0	1	0	NC
1974	Formula One	Frank Williams Racing Cars	0	0	0	0	0	0	NC
1974	Formula One	Team Surtees	0	0	0	0	0	0	NC
1975	European Formula Two	Ecurie Elf	13	1	1	3	3	24	5th
1975	World Sportscar Championship	Elf Alpine-Renault	4	1	2	1	2	0	NC
1975	Formula One	Elf Team Tyrrell	1	0	0	0	0	0	NC
1976	European Formula Two	Ecurie Elf	12	3	4	1	6	53	**1st**
1976	World Sportscar Championship	Elf Alpine-Renault	4	0	0	0	1	0	NC
1976	24 Hours of Le Mans	Renault Sport	1	0	0	0	0	N/A	DNF
1977	Formula One	Equipe Renault Elf	4	0	0	0	0	0	NC
1977	24 Hours of Le Mans	Équipe Renault Elf	1	0	0	0	0	N/A	DNF
1978	Formula One	Equipe Renault Elf	14	0	0	0	0	3	17th
1978	24 Hours of Le Mans	Equipe Renault Elf Sport Calberson	1	0	0	0	0	N/A	4th
1978	24 Hours of Le Mans	Equipe Renault Elf Sport	1	0	0	0	0	N/A	DNF
1979	Formula One	Equipe Renault Elf	14	1	4	0	1	9	13th
1980	Formula One	Equipe Renault Elf	13	1	2	0	1	9	8th
1981	Formula One	Equipe Talbot Gitanes	3	0	0	0	0	0	NC
1987	World Touring Car Championship	Bastos Racing Team	1	0	0	0	0	0	NC
1989	24 Hours of Le Mans	Team Sauber Mercedes	1	0	0	0	0	N/A	5th
1990	World Sportscar Championship	Peugeot Talbot Sport	2	0	0	0	0	0	NC
1991	24 Hours of Le Mans	Peugeot Talbot Sport	1	0	1	0	0	N/A	DNF
1992	24 Hours of Le Mans	Peugeot Talbot Sport	1	0	1	0	1	N/A	**3rd**
1993	24 Hours of Le Mans	Peugeot Talbot Sport	1	0	1	0	1	N/A	**3rd**

=== Complete European Formula Two Championship results ===
(key) (Races in bold indicate pole position; races in italics indicate fastest lap)

Year	Entrant	Chassis	Engine	1	2	3	4	5	6	7	8	9	10	11	12	13	14	15	16	17	Pos.	Pts
1968	Matra Sports	Matra MS7	Cosworth FVA	HOC	THR	JAR	PAL	TUL	ZAN	PER	HOC; 9	VAL									NC	0
1970	Constructions Mécaniques Pygmée	Pygmée MDB15	Cosworth FVA	THR; DNQ	HOC	BAR; 11	ROU; DNQ	PER; 8	TUL	IMO; DNQ	HOC; DNS										16th	2
1971	Equipe Tecno Elf	Tecno TF71	Ford BDA	HOC; Ret	THR	NÜR	JAR; DNQ	PAL; DNQ	ROU; DNQ	MAN	TUL	ALB; DNQ	VLL	VLL							NC	0
1972	Elf John Coombs	March 722	Ford BDA	MAL; Ret	THR	HOC						IMO; NC	MAN; 2	PER; Ret							14th	7
1972	Elf John Coombs	Alpine A367	Ford BDA				PAU; DNQ	PAL	HOC	ROU; DNS	ÖST; Ret				SAL; 9	ALB; Ret	HOC; 10				14th	7
1973	Elf John Coombs	Alpine A367	Ford BDA	MAL	HOC	THR; Ret	NÜR; Ret	PAU	KIN	NIV	HOC	ROU; DNS	MNZ	MAN; Ret	KAR	PER; Ret	SAL	NOR	ALB; 5	VLL	24th	3
1974	Ecurie Elf	Alpine A367	BMW	BAR; 3	HOC	PAU; 4	SAL; Ret	HOC; 1	MUG; 7	KAR	PER	**HOC**; 3	VLL; Ret								4th	20
1975	Ecurie Elf	Elf 2J	BMW	EST; 8	THR; 5	HOC; Ret	NÜR; 4	PAU; 2	HOC; Ret	SAL; 1	**ROU**; Ret	MUG; Ret	PER; Ret	SIL; Ret	ZOL; Ret	NOG; 3	VLL				5th	24
1976	Ecurie Elf	Elf 2J	Renault	HOC; Ret	THR; 14	**VLL**; 1	SAL; 6	PAU; 3	HOC; 4	ROU; 2	**MUG**; 1	PER; 4	EST; 2	**NOG**; Ret	**HOC**; 1						**1st**	**53**

=== 24 Hours of Le Mans results ===
Year	Team	Co-Drivers	Car	Class	Laps	Pos.	Class Pos.
1968	(France) Société des Automobiles Alpine	(France) Jean Guichet	Alpine A220-Renault-Gordini	P 3.0	185	DNF	DNF
1969	(France) Société des Automobiles Alpine	(France) Patrick Depailler	Alpine A220/69-Renault-Gordini	P 3.0	209	DNF	DNF
1970	(France) Equipe Matra-Simca	(France) Patrick Depailler	Matra-Simca MS650	P 3.0	70	DNF	DNF
1972	(France) Équipe Matra-Simca Shell	(United Kingdom) David Hobbs	Matra-Simca MS660C	S 3.0	278	DNF	DNF
1973	(France) Équipe Matra-Simca Shell	(France) Jean-Pierre Jaussaud	Matra-Simca MS670B	S 3.0	331	**3rd**	**3rd**
1974	(France) Équipe Gitanes	(France) François Migault	Matra-Simca MS670C	S 3.0	324	**3rd**	**3rd**
1976	(France) Renault Sport	(France) Patrick Tambay (France) José Dolhem	Renault Alpine A442	S 3.0	135	DNF	DNF
1977	(France) Équipe Renault Elf	(United Kingdom) Derek Bell	Renault Alpine A442	S +2.0	257	DNF	DNF
1978	(France) Equipe Renault Elf Sport Calberson	(France) Guy Fréquelin (France) Jean Ragnotti (France) José Dolhem	Renault Alpine A442A	S +2.0	358	4th	4th
1978	(France) Equipe Renault Elf Sport	(France) Patrick Depailler	Renault Alpine A443	S +2.0	279	DNF	DNF
1989	(Germany) Team Sauber Mercedes	(France) Jean-Louis Schlesser (France) Alain Cudini	Sauber C9-Mercedes	C1	378	5th	5th
1991	(France) Peugeot Talbot Sport	(Italy) Mauro Baldi (France) Philippe Alliot	Peugeot 905	C1	22	DNF	DNF
1992	(France) Peugeot Talbot Sport	(Italy) Mauro Baldi (France) Philippe Alliot	Peugeot 905 Evo 1B	C1	345	**3rd**	**3rd**
1993	(France) Peugeot Talbot Sport	(Italy) Mauro Baldi (France) Philippe Alliot	Peugeot 905 Evo 1B	C1	367	**3rd**	**3rd**

=== Complete Formula One results ===
(key) (Races in bold indicate pole position)

Year	Entrant	Chassis	Engine	1	2	3	4	5	6	7	8	9	10	11	12	13	14	15	16	17	WDC	Pts.
1974	Frank Williams Racing Cars	Iso–Marlboro FW	Ford Cosworth DFV 3.0 V8	ARG	BRA	RSA	ESP	BEL	MON	SWE	NED	FRA; DNQ	GBR	GER							NC	0
1974	Team Surtees	Surtees TS16	Ford Cosworth DFV 3.0 V8												AUT; DNQ	ITA	CAN	USA			NC	0
1975	Elf Team Tyrrell	Tyrrell 007	Ford Cosworth DFV 3.0 V8	ARG	BRA	RSA	ESP	MON	BEL	SWE	NED	FRA; 12	GBR	GER	AUT	ITA	USA				NC	0
1977	Equipe Renault Elf	Renault RS01	Renault-Gordini EF1 1.5 V6 t	ARG	BRA	RSA	USW	ESP	MON	BEL	SWE	FRA	GBR; Ret	GER	AUT	NED; Ret	ITA; Ret	USA; Ret	CAN; DNQ	JPN	NC	0
1978	Equipe Renault Elf	Renault RS01	Renault-Gordini EF1 1.5 V6 t	ARG	BRA	RSA; Ret	USW; Ret	MON; 10	BEL; NC	ESP; 13	SWE; Ret	FRA; Ret	GBR; Ret	GER; Ret	AUT; Ret	NED; Ret	ITA; Ret	USA; 4	CAN; 12		17th	3
1979	Equipe Renault Elf	Renault RS01	Renault-Gordini EF1 1.5 V6 t	ARG; Ret	BRA; 10	**RSA**; Ret	USW; DNS														13th	9
1979	Equipe Renault Elf	Renault RS10	Renault-Gordini EF1 1.5 V6 t					ESP; Ret	BEL; Ret	MON; NC	**FRA**; 1	GBR; Ret	**GER**; Ret	AUT; Ret	NED; Ret	**ITA**; 14	CAN; Ret	USA; Ret			13th	9
1980	Equipe Renault Elf	Renault RE20	Renault-Gordini EF1 1.5 V6 t	ARG; Ret	**BRA**; Ret	**RSA**; Ret	USW; 10	BEL; Ret	MON; Ret	FRA; Ret	GBR; Ret	GER; Ret	AUT; 1	NED; Ret	ITA; Ret	CAN; Ret	USA				8th	9
1981	Equipe Talbot Gitanes	Ligier JS17	Matra MS81 3.0 V12	USW	BRA	ARG; DNQ	SMR; NC	BEL; Ret	MON; DNQ	ESP; Ret	FRA	GBR	GER	AUT	NED	ITA	CAN	CPL			NC	0

Sporting positions
Preceded by Jacques Laffite	European Formula Two; Champion; 1976	Succeeded by René Arnoux
