= 1980 French Grand Prix =

- Race 7 of 14 in the 1980 Formula One season
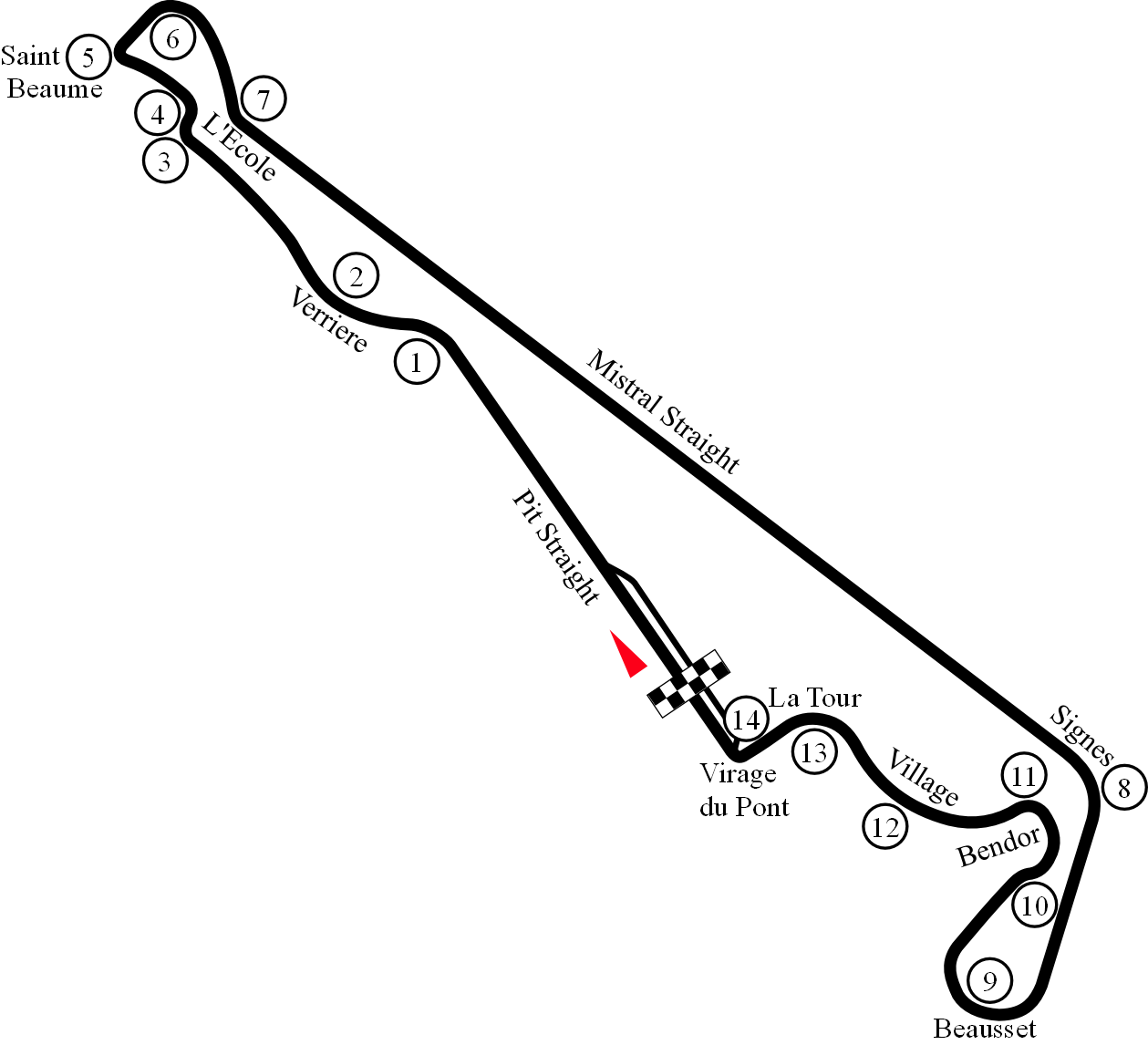

Race details
- Date: June 29, 1980
- Location: Paul Ricard Circuit
- Course: Permanent racing facility
- Course length: 5.809 km (3.610 miles)
- Distance: 54 laps, 313.686 km (194.915 miles)
- Weather: Dry

Pole position
Driver	(France) Jacques Laffite	Ligier-Ford
- Time: 1:38.88

Fastest lap
Driver	(Australia) Alan Jones	Williams-Ford
- Time: 1:41.45 on lap 48

Podium
First	(Australia) Alan Jones	Williams-Ford
Second	(France) Didier Pironi	Ligier-Ford
Third	(France) Jacques Laffite	Ligier-Ford

The 1980 French Grand Prix was a Formula One motor race held at Paul Ricard on 29 June 1980. It was the seventh round of the 1980 Formula One season. The race was the 58th French Grand Prix, or the 66th Grand Prix de l'ACF and the sixth to be held at Paul Ricard. The race was held over 54 laps of the 5.809-kilometre circuit for a total race distance of 314 kilometres.

== Controversy ==
Originally the race was the eighth round of the season but moved up the order after the Spanish Grand Prix was removed from the schedule as a consequence of the first major confrontation between FISA and FOCA. The controversy threatened to spill over into the French Grand Prix as well as the FISA aligned teams, primarily Ferrari, Renault and Alfa Romeo, had boycotted the Spanish race which later saw its results removed from championship considerations. The two camps came to an agreement in time for the French Grand Prix to not be affected.

== Results ==
The race was won by Alan Jones driving a Williams FW07B. The win was Jones' seventh Formula One Grand Prix victory and his third of the year. Jones was entering a period of good form having won the Spanish Grand Prix four weeks earlier. Jones won by four seconds over French driver Didier Pironi driving a Ligier JS11/15. Third was Pironi's French teammate Jacques Laffite. Laffite had led for much of the race until his tyres lost condition. The large French contingent had dominated proceedings with the all-French teams Renault and Ligier taking up four of the top six grid positions with only Jones and his Williams teammate Carlos Reutemann intervening. Jean-Pierre Jabouille's Renault RE20 broke its transmission at the start and Jones picked his way past Pironi then the second Renault of René Arnoux before finally catching Laffite on lap 34.

Arnoux faded to fifth behind Nelson Piquet (Brabham BT49) with throttle problems with Reutemann taking the final point in sixth. The win saw Jones move back into the championship lead passing Arnoux and Piquet. Jones now led Piquet by three points and Arnoux by five. Pironi was now equal with Arnoux.

Williams now led Ligier by five points, unchanged from Monaco thanks to the efforts of all four drivers and Brabham increased the gap over Renault in third and fourth.

== Shadow Racing Cars ==
This race also saw the final appearance of Shadow Racing Cars. Geoff Lees and David Kennedy were 25th and 27th in qualifying in the Shadow DN12s meaning both drivers missed the 24-car grid. The team had been sold only two months previously to Macau-based businessman and motor racing team owner Teddy Yip. Yip's own race team Theodore Racing would emerge as a Formula One team in 1981.

== Classification ==
=== Qualifying ===
Pos	No.	Driver	Constructor	Time	Gap
1	26	(France) Jacques Laffite	Ligier-Ford	1:38.88	-
2	16	(France) René Arnoux	Renault	1:39.49	+ 0.61
3	25	(France) Didier Pironi	Ligier-Ford	1:39.49	+ 0.61
4	27	(Australia) Alan Jones	Williams-Ford	1:39.50	+ 0.62
5	28	(Argentina) Carlos Reutemann	Williams-Ford	1:39.60	+ 0.78
6	15	(France) Jean-Pierre Jabouille	Renault	1:40.18	+ 1.30
7	8	(France) Alain Prost	McLaren-Ford	1:40.63	+ 1.75
8	5	(Brazil) Nelson Piquet	Brabham-Ford	1:40.67	+ 1.79
9	23	(Italy) Bruno Giacomelli	Alfa Romeo	1:40.85	+ 1.97
10	22	(France) Patrick Depailler	Alfa Romeo	1:40.89	+ 2.01
11	9	(Switzerland) Marc Surer	ATS-Ford	1:41.03	+ 2.15
12	11	(United States) Mario Andretti	Lotus-Ford	1:41.56	+ 2.68
13	7	(United Kingdom) John Watson	McLaren-Ford	1:41.63	+ 2.75
14	12	(Italy) Elio de Angelis	Lotus-Ford	1:41.66	+ 2.78
15	30	(West Germany) Jochen Mass	Arrows-Ford	1:41.71	+ 2.83
16	3	(France) Jean-Pierre Jarier	Tyrrell-Ford	1:41.78	+ 2.90
17	2	(Canada) Gilles Villeneuve	Ferrari	1:41.99	+ 3.11
18	29	(Italy) Riccardo Patrese	Arrows-Ford	1:42.07	+ 3.19
19	1	(South Africa) Jody Scheckter	Ferrari	1:42.38	+ 3.50
20	4	(Republic of Ireland) Derek Daly	Tyrrell-Ford	1:42.77	+ 3.89
21	31	(United States) Eddie Cheever	Osella-Ford	1:42.85	+ 3.97
22	6	(Argentina) Ricardo Zunino	Brabham-Ford	1:43.14	+ 4.26
23	21	(Finland) Keke Rosberg	Fittipaldi-Ford	1:43.16	+ 4.28
24	20	(Brazil) Emerson Fittipaldi	Fittipaldi-Ford	1:43.21	+ 4.33
25	17	(United Kingdom) Geoff Lees	Shadow-Ford	1:44.28	+ 5.40
26	14	(Netherlands) Jan Lammers	Ensign-Ford	1:44.33	+ 5.45
27	18	(Republic of Ireland) David Kennedy	Shadow-Ford	1:44.56	+ 5.68

=== Race ===
Pos	No	Driver	Constructor	Tyre	Laps	Time/Retired	Grid	Points
1	27	(Australia) Alan Jones	Williams-Ford	G	54	1:32:43.4	4	9
2	25	(France) Didier Pironi	Ligier-Ford	G	54	+4.52 secs	3	6
3	26	(France) Jacques Laffite	Ligier-Ford	G	54	+30.26 secs	1	4
4	5	(Brazil) Nelson Piquet	Brabham-Ford	G	54	+1:14.88 secs	8	3
5	16	(France) René Arnoux	Renault	MI	54	+1:16.15 secs	2	2
6	28	(Argentina) Carlos Reutemann	Williams-Ford	G	54	+1:16.74 secs	5	1
7	7	(United Kingdom) John Watson	McLaren-Ford	G	53	+1 Lap	13	
8	2	(Canada) Gilles Villeneuve	Ferrari	MI	53	+1 Lap	17	
9	29	(Italy) Riccardo Patrese	Arrows-Ford	G	53	+1 Lap	18	
10	30	(West Germany) Jochen Mass	Arrows-Ford	G	53	+1 Lap	15	
11	4	(Republic of Ireland) Derek Daly	Tyrrell-Ford	G	52	+2 Laps	20	
12	1	(South Africa) Jody Scheckter	Ferrari	MI	52	+2 Laps	19	
13	20	(Brazil) Emerson Fittipaldi	Fittipaldi-Ford	G	50	Engine	24	
14	3	(France) Jean-Pierre Jarier	Tyrrell-Ford	G	50	+4 Laps	16	
Ret	31	(United States) Eddie Cheever	Osella-Ford	G	43	Engine	21	
Ret	9	(Switzerland) Marc Surer	ATS-Ford	G	26	Gearbox	11	
Ret	22	(France) Patrick Depailler	Alfa Romeo	G	25	Handling	10	
Ret	11	(United States) Mario Andretti	Lotus-Ford	G	18	Gearbox	12	
Ret	21	(Finland) Keke Rosberg	Fittipaldi-Ford	G	8	Spun Off	23	
Ret	23	(Italy) Bruno Giacomelli	Alfa Romeo	G	8	Handling	9	
Ret	8	(France) Alain Prost	McLaren-Ford	G	6	Transmission	7	
Ret	12	(Italy) Elio de Angelis	Lotus-Ford	G	3	Clutch	14	
Ret	15	(France) Jean-Pierre Jabouille	Renault	MI	0	Transmission	6	
Ret	6	(Argentina) Ricardo Zunino	Brabham-Ford	G	0	Clutch	22	
DNQ	17	(United Kingdom) Geoff Lees	Shadow-Ford	G				
DNQ	14	(Netherlands) Jan Lammers	Ensign-Ford	G				
DNQ	18	(Republic of Ireland) David Kennedy	Shadow-Ford	G				

== Notes ==
- This was the 10th French Grand Prix win for a Ford-powered car.

== Championship standings after the race ==
Drivers' Championship standings

	Pos	Driver	Points
2	1	(Australia) Alan Jones	28
1	2	(Brazil) Nelson Piquet	25
1	3	(France) René Arnoux	23
	4	(France) Didier Pironi	23
	5	(Argentina) Carlos Reutemann	16

Constructors' Championship standings

Pos	Constructor	Points
1	(United Kingdom) Williams-Ford	44
2	(France) Ligier-Ford	39
3	(United Kingdom) Brabham-Ford	25
4	(France) Renault	23
5	(United Kingdom) Arrows-Ford	11

- Note: Only the top five positions are included for both sets of standings.

Previous race: 1980 Monaco Grand Prix	FIA Formula One World Championship; 1980 season	Next race: 1980 British Grand Prix
Previous race: 1979 French Grand Prix	French Grand Prix	Next race: 1981 French Grand Prix
