= 1980 United States Grand Prix West =

- Race 4 of 14 in the 1980 Formula One season
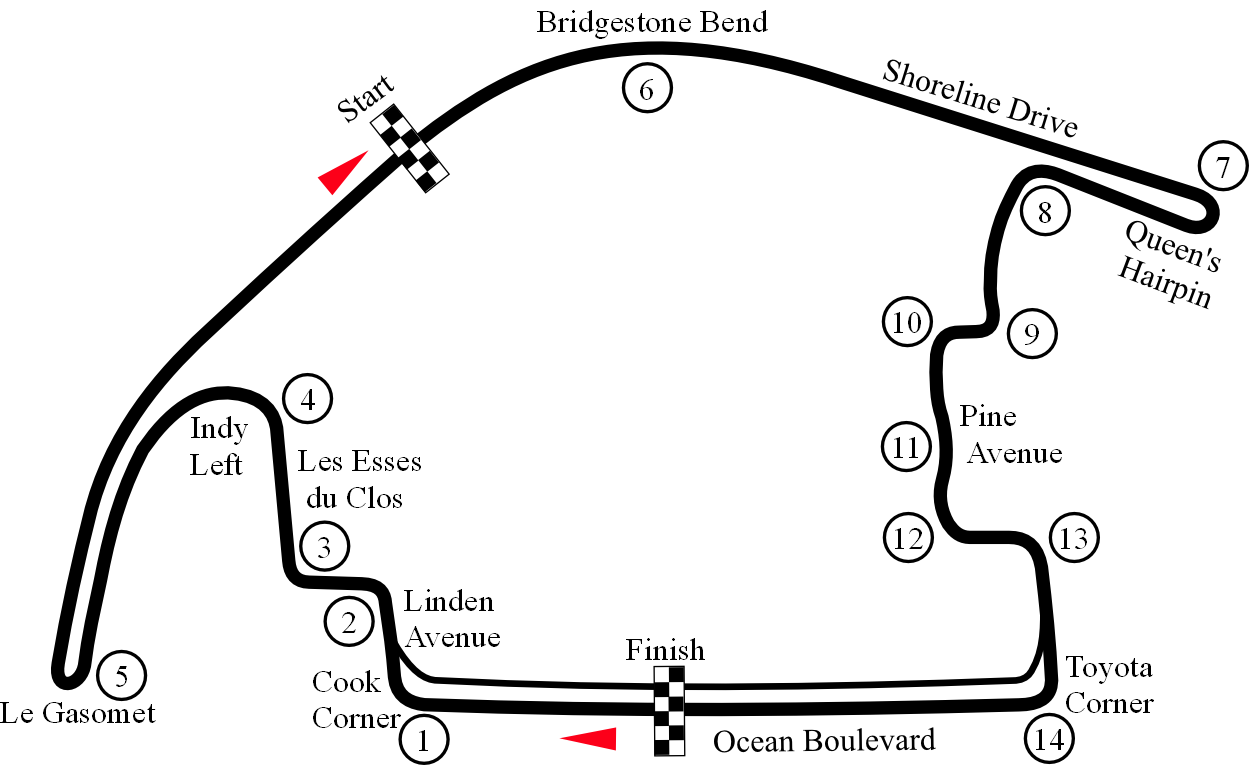

Race details
- Date: March 30, 1980
- Official name: Toyota Grand Prix of Long Beach
- Location: Long Beach Street Circuit
- Course: Temporary street course
- Course length: 3.251 km (2.02 miles)
- Distance: 80 laps, 260.08 km (161.60 miles)
- Weather: Sunny and warm with temperatures reaching up to 81 °F (27 °C); wind speeds up to 10.9 miles per hour (17.5 km/h)

Pole position
Driver	(Brazil) Nelson Piquet	Brabham-Ford
- Time: 1:17.694

Fastest lap
Driver	(Brazil) Nelson Piquet	Brabham-Ford
- Time: 1:19.83 on lap 38

Podium
First	(Brazil) Nelson Piquet	Brabham-Ford
Second	(Italy) Riccardo Patrese	Arrows-Ford
Third	(Brazil) Emerson Fittipaldi	Fittipaldi-Ford

The 1980 United States Grand Prix West (officially the Toyota Grand Prix of Long Beach) was a Formula One motor race held on March 30, 1980, at Long Beach Street Circuit. It was the fourth round of the 1980 Formula One season. The race was the fifth United States Grand Prix West and the sixth street race to be held at Long Beach. The race was held over 80 laps of the 3.251-kilometre circuit for a total race distance of 260 kilometres.

The race was won by Brazilian driver Nelson Piquet driving a Brabham BT49. It was Piquet's debut World Championship victory in just his fourth points finish and announced his emergence as a championship contender. Piquet won by 49 seconds over Italian driver Riccardo Patrese driving an Arrows A3. It was the best result for both Arrows and Patrese in two years after Patrese finished second at the 1978 Swedish Grand Prix. Third was Brazilian driver, twice-World Champion Emerson Fittipaldi driving a Fittipaldi F7. It was Fittipaldi's best result since finishing second at the 1978 Brazilian Grand Prix. The race would also see defending champion Jody Scheckter of Ferrari score his only points of the 1980 season with the South African scoring two points by finishing the race in fifth place.

== Summary ==
Nelson Piquet took pole, fastest lap and his first career race win to dominate the weekend in his gleaming blue and white Brabham. The Brazilian's qualifying time was a full second ahead of the rest of the field, and he led all 80 laps of the race to win by 49 seconds and grab a share of the lead in the Drivers' Championship. The race would be the last in Formula One for Swiss driver Clay Regazzoni, who suffered spinal damage when he lost the brakes in his Ensign approaching the Queen’s Hairpin, and struck a parked Brabham in the run-off followed by a concrete barrier and tires head on at 150 mph (240 km/h).

In Friday qualifying, Frenchman Didier Pironi recorded the fastest time, but getting a good lap on Saturday was a matter of using the soft qualifying tires at the right time and slotting in a good time before the track became too oily. Piquet was easily the fastest man on the circuit, using Goodyear tires, but Championship leader René Arnoux grabbed second place in his Renault with an early run on soft Michelins. The big surprise, however, was Jan Lammers, who put his ATS in fourth position while subbing for the injured Marc Surer. James Hunt nearly made a comeback with McLaren, asking for $1 million for the race. This opportunity came about when French rookie driver Alain Prost broke his wrist during practice for the South African Grand Prix, and was not fully fit to drive at Long Beach. The team's main sponsor, Marlboro, offered half the figure but negotiations ended after Hunt broke his leg while skiing. Stephen South substituted but South failed to qualify. Pironi slipped to ninth by the end of the session, while the Ferraris of Gilles Villeneuve and Jody Scheckter, so dominant here the year before, struggled to 10th and 16th, and Emerson Fittipaldi just managed to scramble onto the grid in the 24th and final spot. Americans Mario Andretti (Lotus) and Eddie Cheever (Osella), in his first full F1 season, were 15th and 19th.

The only mis-step of Piquet's weekend came in the Sunday morning warmup when he and Derek Daly collided entering the corner after the pits. The Brabham was vaulted into the air and landed heavily on all four tires, while Daly's Tyrrell went down the escape road. After careful examination, the Brabham crew decided that the car was fine and ready to race.

Entering the first corner Ricardo Zunino, Andretti, Jochen Mass and Jean-Pierre Jarier all made contact under braking. Zunino's Brabham and Andretti's Lotus were unable to continue. After one lap, Piquet led Patrick Depailler, who had gotten by René Arnoux in the hairpin. They were followed by Alan Jones, Bruno Giacomelli, Riccardo Patrese, Carlos Reutemann, Villeneuve and Daly.

On lap 4, Giacomelli lost control of his Alfa Romeo under braking for the hairpin at the beginning of Shoreline Drive, and slid sideways across the racing line. Reutemann, following directly behind, was the first to be collected and Jody Scheckter, Elio de Angelis, Cheever, Mass and Jarier also became involved. According to Reutemann, while Giacomelli's Alfa was facing the inside wall, he let 6th-placed Patrese pass, and then immediately put his car in reverse, and backed onto the racing line, and the approaching 7th-placed Reutemann had to come to a dead stop to avoid hitting the Italian's Alfa head on and stalled his engine. Villeneuve and Daly, who were behind Reutemann were both able to avoid hitting the Williams and the Alfa. Giacomelli, realizing he had made a mistake, went back to where he was, and he ended up blocking the track. This then caused Scheckter, de Angelis, Cheever, Jarier and Mass- all the cars that had been behind Daly to have a motorway-accordion-style accident right behind the stalled Reutemann where they crashed into the front and back of each other in order. By the time Giacomelli had realized what had happened, the 6 other aforementioned cars including Reutemann were already at a dead stop, although he and Scheckter, who had both stalled had not hit anything, de Angelis (who was injured), Cheever and Jarier had crashed, the latter most seriously; a wheel ripped off Jarier's Tyrrell when he hit de Angelis’s Lotus and he went into the run-off area. Mass was the luckiest, although he had not stalled he would end up losing several positions. The marshals decided to move forward Giacomelli, Reutemann and Cheever, all were able to continue for the time being, though Giacomelli and Cheever retired later in the race, and Reutemann had retired soon afterwards with gearbox problems. Mass was able to get going again, and he, Jabouille, Laffite, Rosberg, Regazzoni, Fittipaldi and Watson just managed to squeeze through the carnage, and the marshals somehow got the track cleared before the leaders came around, avoiding a red flag to stop the race.

While Piquet continued to run unchallenged in front, Depailler was struggling with fading brakes on his Alfa Romeo. On lap 18, Jones caught and passed him on the outside of the hairpin to take second place. Meanwhile, Giacomelli was working his way back up through the field ahead of an extended battle between Regazzoni, Fittipaldi and John Watson. Gilles Villeneuve had managed to get the ill handling Ferrari into a good fourth place but his transmission failed on lap 46 and he was out of the race.

After pitting for tires on lap 47, Giacomelli rejoined in 12th place, just ahead of Jones, but about to be lapped by the Williams for the second time, and he continued his reckless on-track conduct. As Jones moved inside to pass the Italian entering the hairpin at the end of the straight, Giacomelli turned in and Jones struck the Alfa Romeo's rear wheel, bending the steering arm on the Williams and putting Jones out of the race. This left Piquet with a lead of more than a minute over Patrese and Arnoux, and he began to ease off, allowing some cars to unlap themselves.

Lap 50 saw an horrific accident which would ultimately end the career of Clay Regazzoni, the brakes on his Ensign N180 car failed on the long start finish straight, unable to reduce speed, he hit the stationary Brabham of Ricardo Zunino which had been left at the run off of the Queen’s hairpin since lap 1, and then head on into a concrete wall. The accident left him paralyzed from the waist down. Regazzoni later sued the race organisers, but lost the case.

On lap 63, Arnoux had his right rear tire go completely flat, and by the time he was able to make it back to the pits for a replacement, he had dropped all the way to ninth place. Watson now began to challenge Fittipaldi for third, and even get around him briefly, but gearbox troubles allowed the Brazilian to retake the position and then pull away. Watson, in fact, came under fire from Scheckter's Ferrari. Braking into the hairpin, Scheckter tried to go around the outside, as Watson defended the inside line. He slid wide on the dirt and marbles, however, and thereafter, decided to settle for 5th place and his final points in Formula One.

For Piquet, it was the first of 23 career wins and pulled him even with Arnoux in the Drivers' Championship. For Fittipaldi, who finished third behind a steady Patrese in the Arrows, it was his first podium in more than two years, and the last of his F1 career (both as a driver and as a constructor). The torch was passed from one Brazilian multiple World Champion to another.

== Classification ==
=== Qualifying ===
Pos	No.	Driver	Constructor	Time	Gap
1	5	(Brazil) Nelson Piquet	Brabham-Ford	1:17.694	-
2	16	(France) René Arnoux	Renault	1:18.689	+ 0.995
3	22	(France) Patrick Depailler	Alfa Romeo	1:18.719	+ 1.025
4	9	(Netherlands) Jan Lammers	ATS-Ford	1:18.783	+ 1.089
5	27	(Australia) Alan Jones	Williams-Ford	1:18.819	+ 1.125
6	23	(Italy) Bruno Giacomelli	Alfa Romeo	1:18.924	+ 1.230
7	28	(Argentina) Carlos Reutemann	Williams-Ford	1:18.964	+ 1.270
8	29	(Italy) Riccardo Patrese	Arrows-Ford	1:19.071	+ 1.377
9	25	(France) Didier Pironi	Ligier-Ford	1:19.276	+ 1.582
10	2	(Canada) Gilles Villeneuve	Ferrari	1:19.285	+ 1.591
11	15	(France) Jean-Pierre Jabouille	Renault	1:19.316	+ 1.622
12	3	(France) Jean-Pierre Jarier	Tyrrell-Ford	1:19.318	+ 1.624
13	26	(France) Jacques Laffite	Ligier-Ford	1:19.455	+ 1.88
14	4	(Republic of Ireland) Derek Daly	Tyrrell-Ford	1:19.744	+ 2.050
15	11	(United States) Mario Andretti	Lotus-Ford	1:19.763	+ 2.069
16	1	(South Africa) Jody Scheckter	Ferrari	1:20.151	+ 2.457
17	30	(West Germany) Jochen Mass	Arrows-Ford	1:20.410	+ 2.716
18	6	(Argentina) Ricardo Zunino	Brabham-Ford	1:20.419	+ 2.725
19	31	(United States) Eddie Cheever	Osella-Ford	1:20.808	+ 3.83
20	12	(Italy) Elio de Angelis	Lotus-Ford	1:20.830	+ 3.114
21	7	(United Kingdom) John Watson	McLaren-Ford	1:20.868	+ 3.174
22	21	(Finland) Keke Rosberg	Fittipaldi-Ford	1:20.911	+ 3.217
23	14	(Switzerland) Clay Regazzoni	Ensign-Ford	1:20.984	+ 3.290
24	20	(Brazil) Emerson Fittipaldi	Fittipaldi-Ford	1:21.350	+ 3.656
25	18	(Republic of Ireland) David Kennedy	Shadow-Ford	1:21.523	+ 3.829
26	17	(United Kingdom) Geoff Lees	Shadow-Ford	1:23.486	+ 5.792
27	8	(United Kingdom) Stephen South	McLaren-Ford	1:24.121	+ 6.427

=== Race ===
Pos	No	Driver	Constructor	Tyre	Laps	Time/Retired	Grid	Points
1	5	(Brazil) Nelson Piquet	Brabham-Ford	G	80	1:50:18.550	1	9
2	29	(Italy) Riccardo Patrese	Arrows-Ford	G	80	+ 49.212	8	6
3	20	(Brazil) Emerson Fittipaldi	Fittipaldi-Ford	G	80	+ 1:18.563	24	4
4	7	(United Kingdom) John Watson	McLaren-Ford	G	79	+ 1 Lap	21	3
5	1	(South Africa) Jody Scheckter	Ferrari	MI	79	+ 1 Lap	16	2
6	25	(France) Didier Pironi	Ligier-Ford	G	79	+ 1 Lap	9	1
7	30	(West Germany) Jochen Mass	Arrows-Ford	G	79	+ 1 Lap	17	
8	4	(Republic of Ireland) Derek Daly	Tyrrell-Ford	G	79	+ 1 Lap	14	
9	16	(France) René Arnoux	Renault	MI	78	+ 2 Laps	2	
NC	15	(France) Jean-Pierre Jabouille	Renault	MI	71	+ 9 Laps	11	
Ret	21	(Finland) Keke Rosberg	Fittipaldi-Ford	G	58	Overheating	22	
Ret	14	(Switzerland) Clay Regazzoni	Ensign-Ford	G	50	Accident	23	
Ret	27	(Australia) Alan Jones	Williams-Ford	G	49	Collision	5	
Ret	23	(Italy) Bruno Giacomelli	Alfa Romeo	G	47	Collision	6	
Ret	2	(Canada) Gilles Villeneuve	Ferrari	MI	46	Transmission	10	
Ret	22	(France) Patrick Depailler	Alfa Romeo	G	40	Suspension	3	
Ret	26	(France) Jacques Laffite	Ligier-Ford	G	36	Puncture	13	
Ret	31	(United States) Eddie Cheever	Osella-Ford	G	11	Transmission	19	
Ret	28	(Argentina) Carlos Reutemann	Williams-Ford	G	3	Transmission	7	
Ret	3	(France) Jean-Pierre Jarier	Tyrrell-Ford	G	3	Accident	12	
Ret	12	(Italy) Elio de Angelis	Lotus-Ford	G	3	Accident	20	
Ret	9	(Netherlands) Jan Lammers	ATS-Ford	G	0	Transmission	4	
Ret	11	(United States) Mario Andretti	Lotus-Ford	G	0	Accident	15	
Ret	6	(Argentina) Ricardo Zunino	Brabham-Ford	G	0	Accident	18	
DNQ	18	(Republic of Ireland) David Kennedy	Shadow-Ford	G				
DNQ	17	(United Kingdom) Geoff Lees	Shadow-Ford	G				
DNQ	8	(United Kingdom) Stephen South	McLaren-Ford	G				

== Notes ==
- This was the Formula One World Championship debut for British driver Stephen South.
- This was the first Grand Slam for a Brazilian driver.

== Championship standings after the race ==
Drivers' Championship standings

	Pos	Driver	Points
	1	(France) René Arnoux	18
1	2	(Brazil) Nelson Piquet	18
1	3	(Australia) Alan Jones	13
	4	(France) Didier Pironi	8
8	5	(Italy) Riccardo Patrese	7

Constructors' Championship standings

	Pos	Constructor	Points
	1	(France) Renault	18
2	2	(United Kingdom) Brabham-Ford	18
1	3	(United Kingdom) Williams-Ford	15
1	4	(France) Ligier-Ford	14
5	5	(United Kingdom) Arrows-Ford	8

- Note: Only the top five positions are included for both sets of standings.

Previous race: 1980 South African Grand Prix	FIA Formula One World Championship; 1980 season	Next race: 1980 Belgian Grand Prix
Previous race: 1979 United States Grand Prix West	United States Grand Prix West	Next race: 1981 United States Grand Prix West

Preceded by 1979 United States Grand Prix West	Grand Prix of Long Beach	Succeeded by 1981 United States Grand Prix West
