= 1980 Monaco Grand Prix =

Coordinates: 43°44′4.74″N 7°25′16.8″E

- Race 6 of 14 in the 1980 Formula One season
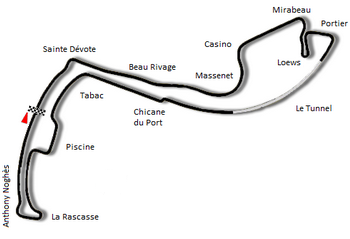

Race details
- Date: 18 May 1980
- Location: Circuit de Monaco
- Course: Street circuit
- Course length: 3.312 km (2.057 miles)
- Distance: 76 laps, 251.712 km (156.406 miles)
- Weather: Dry at the start, damp in the end

Pole position
Driver	(France) Didier Pironi	Ligier-Ford
- Time: 1:24.813

Fastest lap
Driver	(Argentina) Carlos Reutemann	Williams-Ford
- Time: 1:27.418 on lap 40

Podium
First	(Argentina) Carlos Reutemann	Williams-Ford
Second	(France) Jacques Laffite	Ligier-Ford
Third	(Brazil) Nelson Piquet	Brabham-Ford

The 1980 Monaco Grand Prix was a Formula One motor race held at Monaco on 18 May 1980. It was the sixth round of the 1980 Formula One season. The race was the 38th Monaco Grand Prix. The race was held over 76 laps of the 3.34-kilometre circuit for a total race distance of 254 kilometres.

It was won by Carlos Reutemann driving a Williams FW07B after polesitter Didier Pironi crashed at the Casino corner on lap 55. The win was the Argentine Reutemann's tenth Formula One victory and his first since the 1978 United States Grand Prix. He also became the fifth winner in six races of the 1980 season. Reutemann won by 1 minute and 13 seconds over French driver Jacques Laffite driving Ligier JS11/15. Third was Brazilian driver Nelson Piquet driving a Brabham BT49. Piquet's third place moved him past René Arnoux and Alan Jones into the lead of the world championship for the first time.

The race however is remembered for a memorable and spectacular crash at the start of the race when Derek Daly collided with Bruno Giacomelli's Alfa Romeo 179, which sent Daly's Tyrrell 010 flying over Giacomelli and landing between teammate Jean-Pierre Jarier and Alain Prost's McLaren M29. All four drivers were out on the spot, but none suffered any serious injury. Jan Lammers also collected damage in his ATS D4 but was able to continue. The accident was particularly disappointing for McLaren after John Watson failed to qualify for Monaco's shortened 20 car grid.

Fourth was West German driver Jochen Mass driving an Arrows A3 one lap down on Reutemann ahead of Canadian Gilles Villeneuve in a Ferrari 312T5. A further lap down in sixth was dual-World Champion Emerson Fittipaldi in a Fittipaldi F7. For Mass and Fittipaldi it would be last world championship points they would collect.

Reutemann's win put Williams in the lead of the constructor's points race by five points over Ligier.

== Qualifying classification ==
Pos	No.	Driver	Constructor	Time	Gap
1	25	(France) Didier Pironi	Ligier-Ford	1:24.813	-
2	28	(Argentina) Carlos Reutemann	Williams-Ford	1:24.882	+ 0.069
3	27	(Australia) Alan Jones	Williams-Ford	1:25.202	+ 1.019
4	5	(Brazil) Nelson Piquet	Brabham-Ford	1:25.358	+ 1.175
5	26	(France) Jacques Laffite	Ligier-Ford	1:25.510	+ 1.327
6	2	(Canada) Gilles Villeneuve	Ferrari	1:26.104	+ 1.921
7	22	(France) Patrick Depailler	Alfa Romeo	1:26.210	+ 2.027
8	23	(Italy) Bruno Giacomelli	Alfa Romeo	1:26.227	+ 2.044
9	3	(France) Jean-Pierre Jarier	Tyrrell-Ford	1:26.369	+ 2.186
10	8	(France) Alain Prost	McLaren-Ford	1:26.826	+ 2.643
11	29	(Italy) Riccardo Patrese	Arrows-Ford	1:26.828	+ 2.645
12	4	(Republic of Ireland) Derek Daly	Tyrrell-Ford	1:26.838	+ 2.655
13	9	(Netherlands) Jan Lammers	ATS-Ford	1:26.883	+ 2.700
14	12	(Italy) Elio de Angelis	Lotus-Ford	1:26.930	+ 2.747
15	30	(West Germany) Jochen Mass	Arrows-Ford	1:26.956	+ 2.773
16	15	(France) Jean-Pierre Jabouille	Renault	1:27.099	+ 2.916
17	1	(South Africa) Jody Scheckter	Ferrari	1:27.182	+ 2.999
18	20	(Brazil) Emerson Fittipaldi	Fittipaldi-Ford	1:27.495	+ 3.312
19	11	(United States) Mario Andretti	Lotus-Ford	1:27.514	+ 3.331
20	16	(France) René Arnoux	Renault	1:27.524	+ 3.341
21	7	(United Kingdom) John Watson	McLaren-Ford	1:27.731	+ 3.548
22	31	(United States) Eddie Cheever	Osella-Ford	1:27.808	+ 3.625
23	17	(United Kingdom) Geoff Lees	Shadow-Ford	1:27.842	+ 3.659
24	21	(Finland) Keke Rosberg	Fittipaldi-Ford	1:28.381	+ 4.198
25	6	(Argentina) Ricardo Zunino	Brabham-Ford	1:28.384	+ 4.201
26	14	(United Kingdom) Tiff Needell	Ensign-Ford	1:29.188	+ 5.005
27	18	(Republic of Ireland) David Kennedy	Shadow-Ford	1:39.986	+ 15.803

== Race classification ==
Pos	No	Driver	Constructor	Tyre	Laps	Time/Retired	Grid	Points
1	28	(Argentina) Carlos Reutemann	Williams-Ford	G	76	1:55:34.365	2	9
2	26	(France) Jacques Laffite	Ligier-Ford	G	76	+ 1:13.629	5	6
3	5	(Brazil) Nelson Piquet	Brabham-Ford	G	76	+ 1:17.726	4	4
4	30	(West Germany) Jochen Mass	Arrows-Ford	G	75	+ 1 lap	15	3
5	2	(Canada) Gilles Villeneuve	Ferrari	MI	75	+ 1 lap	6	2
6	20	(Brazil) Emerson Fittipaldi	Fittipaldi-Ford	G	74	+ 2 laps	18	1
7	11	(United States) Mario Andretti	Lotus-Ford	G	73	+ 3 laps	19	
8	29	(Italy) Riccardo Patrese	Arrows-Ford	G	73	+ 3 laps	11	
9	12	(Italy) Elio de Angelis	Lotus-Ford	G	68	Accident	14	
NC	9	(Netherlands) Jan Lammers	ATS-Ford	G	64	+ 12 laps	13	
Ret	25	(France) Didier Pironi	Ligier-Ford	G	54	Accident	1	
Ret	16	(France) René Arnoux	Renault	MI	53	Accident	20	
Ret	22	(France) Patrick Depailler	Alfa Romeo	G	50	Engine	7	
Ret	1	(South Africa) Jody Scheckter	Ferrari	MI	27	Handling	17	
Ret	15	(France) Jean-Pierre Jabouille	Renault	MI	25	Gearbox	16	
Ret	27	(Australia) Alan Jones	Williams-Ford	G	24	Differential	3	
Ret	23	(Italy) Bruno Giacomelli	Alfa Romeo	G	0	Collision	8	
Ret	3	(France) Jean-Pierre Jarier	Tyrrell-Ford	G	0	Collision	9	
Ret	8	(France) Alain Prost	McLaren-Ford	G	0	Collision	10	
Ret	4	(Republic of Ireland) Derek Daly	Tyrrell-Ford	G	0	Collision	12	
DNQ	7	(United Kingdom) John Watson	McLaren-Ford	G				
DNQ	31	(United States) Eddie Cheever	Osella-Ford	G				
DNQ	17	(United Kingdom) Geoff Lees	Shadow-Ford	G				
DNQ	21	(Finland) Keke Rosberg	Fittipaldi-Ford	G				
DNQ	6	(Argentina) Ricardo Zunino	Brabham-Ford	G				
DNQ	14	(United Kingdom) Tiff Needell	Ensign-Ford	G				
DNQ	18	(Republic of Ireland) David Kennedy	Shadow-Ford	G				

== Notes ==
- This was the 100th Grand Prix start for an Alfa Romeo-powered car. In those 100 races, an Alfa Romeo-powered car had won 12 Grands Prix, achieved 35 podium finishes, 13 pole positions, 17 fastest laps, 9 Grand Slams and had won 2 Driver's Championships.

== Championship standings after the race ==
Drivers' Championship standings

	Pos	Driver	Points
2	1	(Brazil) Nelson Piquet	22
1	2	(France) René Arnoux	21
1	3	(Australia) Alan Jones	19
	4	(France) Didier Pironi	17
1	5	(Argentina) Carlos Reutemann	15

Constructors' Championship standings

	Pos	Constructor	Points
	1	(United Kingdom) Williams-Ford	34
	2	(France) Ligier-Ford	29
1	3	(United Kingdom) Brabham-Ford	22
1	4	(France) Renault	21
	5	(United Kingdom) Arrows-Ford	11

- Note: Only the top five positions are included for both sets of standings.

Previous race: 1980 Belgian Grand Prix	FIA Formula One World Championship; 1980 season	Next race: 1980 French Grand Prix
Previous race: 1979 Monaco Grand Prix	Monaco Grand Prix	Next race: 1981 Monaco Grand Prix
