= 1980 Brazilian Grand Prix =

- Race 2 of 14 in the 1980 Formula One season
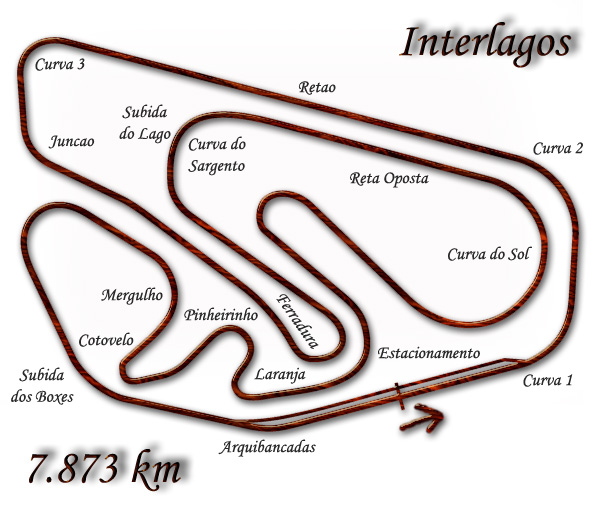

Race details
- Date: January 27, 1980
- Official name: IX Grande Prêmio do Brasil
- Location: Interlagos, São Paulo, Brazil
- Course: Permanent racing facility
- Course length: 7.87385 km (4.893 miles)
- Distance: 40 laps, 314.954 km (195.703 miles)
- Weather: Dry

Pole position
| Driver | (France) Jean-Pierre Jabouille | Renault |
- Time: 2:21.40

Fastest lap
| Driver | (France) René Arnoux | Renault |
- Time: 2:27.31 on lap 22

Podium
| First | (France) René Arnoux | Renault |
| Second | (Italy) Elio de Angelis | Lotus-Ford |
| Third | (Australia) Alan Jones | Williams-Ford |

The 1980 Brazilian Grand Prix was a Formula One motor race held on 27 January 1980 at the Interlagos circuit in the Interlagos neighborhood of São Paulo. It was the second round of the 1980 Formula One season, and it was also the ninth Brazilian Grand Prix. It was the eighth to be held at Interlagos and would be the last until the circuit was substantially redeveloped for the 1990 Brazilian Grand Prix. The race was held over 40 laps of the 7.87-kilometre (4.9 mile) circuit for a total race distance of 315 kilometres. This race was originally supposed to be held at the Jacarepaguá circuit in Rio de Janeiro, but was transferred to Interlagos because parts of the Rio circuit's tarmac were actually sinking into the soft swampland the circuit was built on. This last-minute switch to Interlagos- which was to be resurfaced and heavily rebuilt with new pit facilities and safety measures for the 1981 season caused much controversy- Interlagos had returned a bit too soon for some of the drivers- the facility had been barely and badly maintained over the years.

Months before the race, a number of drivers including world champion Jody Scheckter, wanted to boycott the event due to safety concerns with the circuit. The improvements made to the circuit made in 1978 and 1979 were lacklustre, as the circuit was still extremely bumpy (which the circuit was well known for) and the catch-fencing and barriers surrounding the circuit were not perceived to be adequate to protect the drivers from the embankments and ditches around the circuit. The side skirted-ground effect wing cars at the time were not stiffly sprung yet, and had a tendency to bounce up and down over bumps, making them rather intolerant and of such a rough surface as Interlagos's was, and this made the cars very unpleasant to drive there. The drivers even claimed the surface was so bad that it was actually dangerous to drive those cars at the Sāo Paulo city-located circuit, and although Scheckter and the other concerned drivers nearly succeeded in stopping the race- there was a 13/13 vote, and the drivers then decided to do the race at the 11th hour.

The race was won by French driver René Arnoux driving a Renault RE20. It was Arnoux's first World Championship victory and Equipe Renault's second and the second for a turbocharged car. Arnoux won by 21 seconds over Italian driver Elio de Angelis driving a Lotus 81. Australian driver Alan Jones finished third in his Williams FW07B to maintain himself as Championship points leader.

Thanks to the high altitude (850 meters, or 2,840 feet) of the Interlagos circuit, the turbocharged Renaults of Jean-Pierre Jabouille and René Arnoux were dominant, running 1-2 for much of the race until Jabouille's turbo failed on lap 25. Pole-sitter Jabouille had made a poor start and dropped to fourth, with both Ligier JS11/15s and Gilles Villeneuve in his Ferrari 312T5 getting past; however, Jabouille's horsepower advantage on the high-altitude circuit meant that he passed both Ligiers; Jacques Laffite immediately on the Retao straight, Didier Pironi at Arquibacanas at the end of the first lap and took the lead from Villeneuve at the end of Reta Oposta into Curva do Sol. Arnoux had gotten up to 2nd, and when Jabouille retired Arnoux took the lead over and kept it until the checkered flag.

Alain Prost (McLaren M29) and Riccardo Patrese (Arrows A3) battled for much of the second half of the race for fifth place, with Prost having the advantage through the corners while Patrese was quicker in the straights. Ricardo Zunino (Brabham BT49) bumped into John Watson (McLaren M29) at Curva 3 and spun off; however, he was able to recover and finish the race. Brazilian hopeful Nelson Piquet fought back to sixth after a poor start but then suffered a puncture which subsequently caused suspension failure.

Pironi had to make an early pit stop after one of his aerodynamic skirts was stuck upwards, and he rejoined near the back of the field, however he began a charge and he was able to finish 4th on this most difficult and demanding of circuits. This effort was enough for Enzo Ferrari to take an interest in Pironi's services; which he secured for the 1981 season, replacing Scheckter, who withdrew from the category and motorsport at the end of 1980.

This would be the last of 8 Grands Prix held at the original 5-mile Interlagos circuit. In addition to the safety problems not helped by the rather lackluster upgrades of the circuit, Sāo Paulo had grown at an alarming rate over the space of 10 years from 5 to 8 million people. There were growing favelas and shanty towns around the circuit, and the circuit's surrounding area's poverty-stricken appearance was at odds with Formula One's image, which was evolving into a glamour sport. F1 would return to the Jacarepaguá Autodrome in Rio de Janeiro, having already been there in 1978 and for the rest of the 1980s.

== Classification ==
=== Qualifying ===
| Pos | No. | Driver | Constructor | Time | Gap |
|---|---|---|---|---|---|
| 1 | 15 | (France) Jean-Pierre Jabouille | Renault | 2:21.40 | - |
| 2 | 25 | (France) Didier Pironi | Ligier-Ford | 2:21.65 | + 0.25 |
| 3 | 2 | (Canada) Gilles Villeneuve | Ferrari | 2:22.17 | + 0.77 |
| 4 | 28 | (Argentina) Carlos Reutemann | Williams-Ford | 2:22.26 | + 0.86 |
| 5 | 26 | (France) Jacques Laffite | Ligier-Ford | 2:22.30 | + 0.90 |
| 6 | 16 | (France) René Arnoux | Renault | 2:22.31 | + 0.91 |
| 7 | 12 | (Italy) Elio de Angelis | Lotus-Ford | 2:22.40 | + 1.00 |
| 8 | 1 | (South Africa) Jody Scheckter | Ferrari | 2:23.02 | + 1.62 |
| 9 | 5 | (Brazil) Nelson Piquet | Brabham-Ford | 2:23.16 | + 1.76 |
| 10 | 27 | (Australia) Alan Jones | Williams-Ford | 2:23.38 | + 1.98 |
| 11 | 11 | (United States) Mario Andretti | Lotus-Ford | 2:23.46 | + 2.06 |
| 12 | 14 | (Switzerland) Clay Regazzoni | Ensign-Ford | 2:24.85 | + 3.45 |
| 13 | 8 | (France) Alain Prost | McLaren-Ford | 2:24.95 | + 3.55 |
| 14 | 29 | (Italy) Riccardo Patrese | Arrows-Ford | 2:25.06 | + 3.66 |
| 15 | 21 | (Finland) Keke Rosberg | Fittipaldi-Ford | 2:25.74 | + 4.34 |
| 16 | 30 | (West Germany) Jochen Mass | Arrows-Ford | 2:25.75 | + 4.35 |
| 17 | 23 | (Italy) Bruno Giacomelli | Alfa Romeo | 2:25.80 | + 4.40 |
| 18 | 6 | (Argentina) Ricardo Zunino | Brabham-Ford | 2:26.53 | + 5.13 |
| 19 | 20 | (Brazil) Emerson Fittipaldi | Fittipaldi-Ford | 2:26.86 | + 5.46 |
| 20 | 9 | (Switzerland) Marc Surer | ATS-Ford | 2:27.10 | + 5.70 |
| 21 | 22 | (France) Patrick Depailler | Alfa Romeo | 2:27.11 | + 5.71 |
| 22 | 3 | (France) Jean-Pierre Jarier | Tyrrell-Ford | 2:27.15 | + 5.75 |
| 23 | 7 | (United Kingdom) John Watson | McLaren-Ford | 2:27.29 | + 5.89 |
| 24 | 4 | (Republic of Ireland) Derek Daly | Tyrrell-Ford | 2:28.10 | + 6.70 |
| DNQ | 10 | (Netherlands) Jan Lammers | ATS-Ford | 2:29.54 | + 8.14 |
| DNQ | 18 | (Republic of Ireland) David Kennedy | Shadow-Ford | 2:30.52 | + 9.12 |
| DNQ | 17 | (Sweden) Stefan Johansson | Shadow-Ford | 2:31.48 | +10.08 |
| DNQ | 31 | (United States) Eddie Cheever | Osella-Ford | 2:34.52 | +13.12 |

=== Race ===
| Pos | No | Driver | Constructor | Tyre | Laps | Time/Retired | Grid | Points |
|---|---|---|---|---|---|---|---|---|
| 1 | 16 | (France) René Arnoux | Renault | MI | 40 | 1:40:01.33 | 6 | 9 |
| 2 | 12 | (Italy) Elio de Angelis | Lotus-Ford | G | 40 | +21.86 secs | 7 | 6 |
| 3 | 27 | (Australia) Alan Jones | Williams-Ford | G | 40 | +1:06.11 secs | 10 | 4 |
| 4 | 25 | (France) Didier Pironi | Ligier-Ford | G | 40 | +1:40.13 secs | 2 | 3 |
| 5 | 8 | (France) Alain Prost | McLaren-Ford | G | 40 | +2:25.41 secs | 13 | 2 |
| 6 | 29 | (Italy) Riccardo Patrese | Arrows-Ford | G | 39 | +1 Lap | 14 | 1 |
| 7 | 9 | (Switzerland) Marc Surer | ATS-Ford | G | 39 | +1 Lap | 20 | |
| 8 | 6 | (Argentina) Ricardo Zunino | Brabham-Ford | G | 39 | +1 Lap | 18 | |
| 9 | 21 | (Finland) Keke Rosberg | Fittipaldi-Ford | G | 39 | +1 Lap | 15 | |
| 10 | 30 | (West Germany) Jochen Mass | Arrows-Ford | G | 39 | +1 Lap | 16 | |
| 11 | 7 | (United Kingdom) John Watson | McLaren-Ford | G | 39 | +1 Lap | 23 | |
| 12 | 3 | (France) Jean-Pierre Jarier | Tyrrell-Ford | G | 39 | +1 Lap | 22 | |
| 13 | 23 | (Italy) Bruno Giacomelli | Alfa Romeo | G | 39 | +1 Lap | 17 | |
| 14 | 4 | (Republic of Ireland) Derek Daly | Tyrrell-Ford | G | 38 | +2 Laps | 24 | |
| 15 | 20 | (Brazil) Emerson Fittipaldi | Fittipaldi-Ford | G | 38 | +2 Laps | 19 | |
| 16 | 2 | (Canada) Gilles Villeneuve | Ferrari | MI | 36 | Throttle | 3 | |
| Ret | 22 | (France) Patrick Depailler | Alfa Romeo | G | 33 | Electrical | 21 | |
| Ret | 15 | (France) Jean-Pierre Jabouille | Renault | MI | 25 | Turbo | 1 | |
| Ret | 5 | (Brazil) Nelson Piquet | Brabham-Ford | G | 14 | Suspension | 9 | |
| Ret | 26 | (France) Jacques Laffite | Ligier-Ford | G | 13 | Electrical | 5 | |
| Ret | 14 | (Switzerland) Clay Regazzoni | Ensign-Ford | G | 13 | Engine | 12 | |
| Ret | 1 | (South Africa) Jody Scheckter | Ferrari | MI | 10 | Engine | 8 | |
| Ret | 11 | (United States) Mario Andretti | Lotus-Ford | G | 1 | Spun Off | 11 | |
| Ret | 28 | (Argentina) Carlos Reutemann | Williams-Ford | G | 1 | Halfshaft | 4 | |
| DNQ | 10 | (Netherlands) Jan Lammers | ATS-Ford | G | | | | |
| DNQ | 18 | (Republic of Ireland) David Kennedy | Shadow-Ford | G | | | | |
| DNQ | 17 | (Sweden) Stefan Johansson | Shadow-Ford | G | | | | |
| DNQ | 31 | (United States) Eddie Cheever | Osella-Ford | G | | | | |

== Notes ==
- This was the 25th Grand Prix start for German constructor ATS.
- This was the 5th podium finish for Renault and a Renault-powered car.

== Championship standings after the race ==
Drivers' Championship standings

| | Pos | Driver | Points |
|---|---|---|---|
| | 1 | (Australia) Alan Jones | 13 |
| 20 | 2 | (France) René Arnoux | 9 |
| 1 | 3 | (Brazil) Nelson Piquet | 6 |
| 15 | 4 | (Italy) Elio de Angelis | 6 |
| 2 | 5 | (Finland) Keke Rosberg | 4 |

Constructors' Championship standings

| | Pos | Constructor | Points |
|---|---|---|---|
| | 1 | (United Kingdom) Williams-Ford | 13 |
| 11 | 2 | (France) Renault | 9 |
| 1 | 3 | (United Kingdom) Brabham-Ford | 6 |
| 8 | 4 | (United Kingdom) Lotus-Ford | 6 |
| 2 | 5 | (Brazil) Fittipaldi-Ford | 4 |

- Note: Only the top five positions are included for both sets of standings.

| Previous race: 1980 Argentine Grand Prix | FIA Formula One World Championship; 1980 season | Next race: 1980 South African Grand Prix |
| Previous race: 1979 Brazilian Grand Prix | Brazilian Grand Prix | Next race: 1981 Brazilian Grand Prix; Next race at Interlagos: 1990 Brazilian Grand Prix |
