= 1980 Belgian Grand Prix =

- Race 5 of 14 in the 1980 Formula One season

Race details
- Date: May 4, 1980
- Location: Circuit Zolder, Heusden-Zolder, Belgium
- Course length: 4.262 km (2.648 miles)
- Distance: 72 laps, 306.864 km (190.066 miles)
- Weather: Dry

Pole position
Driver	(Australia) Alan Jones	Williams-Ford
- Time: 1:19.12

Fastest lap
Driver	(France) Jacques Laffite	Ligier-Ford
- Time: 1:20.88 on lap 57

Podium
First	(France) Didier Pironi	Ligier-Ford
Second	(Australia) Alan Jones	Williams-Ford
Third	(Argentina) Carlos Reutemann	Williams-Ford

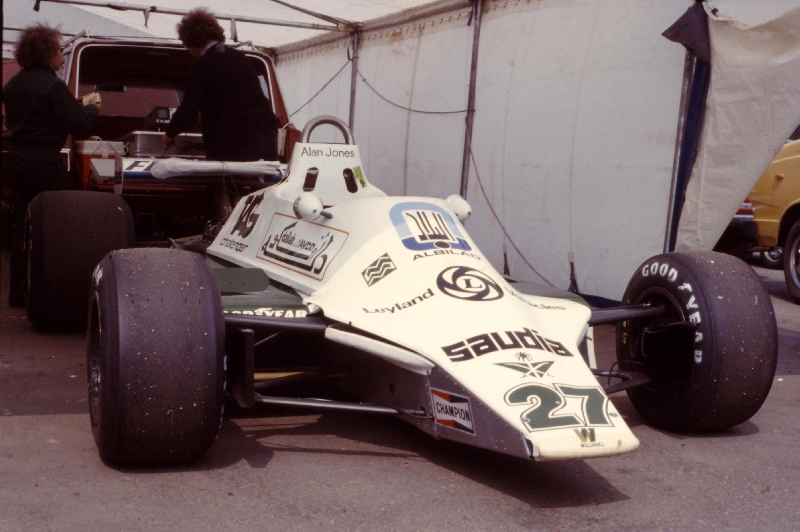
The Williams FW07B of Alan Jones

The 1980 Belgian Grand Prix was a Formula One motor race held at Zolder on 4 May 1980. It was the fifth round of the 1980 Formula One season. The race was the 38th Belgian Grand Prix and the seventh to be held at Zolder. The race was held over 72 laps of the 4.262-kilometre circuit for a total race distance of 307 kilometres.

The race was won by French driver Didier Pironi driving a Ligier JS11/15. It was Pironi's first World Championship victory and he was the fourth driver to win in the first five races of the season. Pironi won by 47 seconds over Australian driver and eventual 1980 champion, Alan Jones driving a Williams FW07B. Third was Jones' Williams Argentine teammate, Carlos Reutemann. It was the first of three wins in Pironi's accident-shortened Formula One career. Jones' second place allowed him to close to within two points of series leader René Arnoux who had collected three points for finishing fourth in his Renault RE20. Piquet was one point behind Jones with Pironi just one point further behind.

== Classification ==
=== Qualifying ===
Pos	No.	Driver	Constructor	Time	Gap
1	27	(Australia) Alan Jones	Williams-Ford	1:19.12	-
2	25	(France) Didier Pironi	Ligier-Ford	1:19.35	+ 0.23
3	26	(France) Jacques Laffite	Ligier-Ford	1:19.69	+ 0.57
4	28	(Argentina) Carlos Reutemann	Williams-Ford	1:19.79	+ 0.67
5	15	(France) Jean-Pierre Jabouille	Renault	1:19.89	+ 0.77
6	16	(France) René Arnoux	Renault	1:19.89	+ 0.77
7	5	(Brazil) Nelson Piquet	Brabham-Ford	1:20.23	+ 1.11
8	12	(Italy) Elio de Angelis	Lotus-Ford	1:20.96	+ 1.84
9	3	(France) Jean-Pierre Jarier	Tyrrell-Ford	1:21.36	+ 2.24
10	22	(France) Patrick Depailler	Alfa Romeo	1:21.45	+ 2.33
11	4	(Republic of Ireland) Derek Daly	Tyrrell-Ford	1:21.51	+ 2.39
12	2	(Canada) Gilles Villeneuve	Ferrari	1:21.54	+ 2.42
13	30	(West Germany) Jochen Mass	Arrows-Ford	1:21.55	+ 2.43
14	1	(South Africa) Jody Scheckter	Ferrari	1:21.58	+ 2.46
15	9	(Netherlands) Jan Lammers	ATS-Ford	1:21.72	+ 2.60
16	29	(Italy) Riccardo Patrese	Arrows-Ford	1:21.75	+ 2.63
17	11	(United States) Mario Andretti	Lotus-Ford	1:22.07	+ 2.95
18	23	(Italy) Bruno Giacomelli	Alfa Romeo	1:22.20	+ 3.08
19	8	(France) Alain Prost	McLaren-Ford	1:22.26	+ 3.14
20	7	(United Kingdom) John Watson	McLaren-Ford	1:22.57	+ 3.45
21	21	(Finland) Keke Rosberg	Fittipaldi-Ford	1:22.97	+ 3.85
22	6	(Argentina) Ricardo Zunino	Brabham-Ford	1:23.18	+ 4.06
23	14	(United Kingdom) Tiff Needell	Ensign-Ford	1:23.50	+ 4.38
24	20	(Brazil) Emerson Fittipaldi	Fittipaldi-Ford	1:24.22	+ 5.10
25	17	(United Kingdom) Geoff Lees	Shadow-Ford	1:24.37	+ 5.25
26	18	(Republic of Ireland) David Kennedy	Shadow-Ford	1:24.64	+ 5.52
27	31	(United States) Eddie Cheever	Osella-Ford	1:40.06	+ 20.94

=== Race ===
Pos	No	Driver	Constructor	Tyre	Laps	Time/Retired	Grid	Points
1	25	(France) Didier Pironi	Ligier-Ford	G	72	1:38:47.4	2	9
2	27	(Australia) Alan Jones	Williams-Ford	G	72	+ 47.37 secs	1	6
3	28	(Argentina) Carlos Reutemann	Williams-Ford	G	72	+ 84.12 secs	4	4
4	16	(France) René Arnoux	Renault	MI	71	+ 1 lap	6	3
5	3	(France) Jean-Pierre Jarier	Tyrrell-Ford	G	71	+ 1 lap	9	2
6	2	(Canada) Gilles Villeneuve	Ferrari	MI	71	+ 1 lap	12	1
7	21	(Finland) Keke Rosberg	Fittipaldi-Ford	G	71	+ 1 lap	21	
8	1	(South Africa) Jody Scheckter	Ferrari	MI	70	+ 2 laps	14	
9	4	(Republic of Ireland) Derek Daly	Tyrrell-Ford	G	70	+ 2 laps	11	
10	12	(Italy) Elio de Angelis	Lotus-Ford	G	69	Spun off	8	
11	26	(France) Jacques Laffite	Ligier-Ford	G	68	+ 4 laps	3	
12	9	(Netherlands) Jan Lammers	ATS-Ford	G	64	Engine	15	
NC	7	(United Kingdom) John Watson	McLaren-Ford	G	61	+ 11 laps	20	
Ret	29	(Italy) Riccardo Patrese	Arrows-Ford	G	58	Spun off	16	
Ret	11	(United States) Mario Andretti	Lotus-Ford	G	41	Gearbox	17	
Ret	22	(France) Patrick Depailler	Alfa Romeo	G	38	Exhaust	10	
Ret	5	(Brazil) Nelson Piquet	Brabham-Ford	G	32	Spun off	7	
Ret	8	(France) Alain Prost	McLaren-Ford	G	29	Transmission	19	
Ret	20	(Brazil) Emerson Fittipaldi	Fittipaldi-Ford	G	16	Electrical	24	
Ret	14	(United Kingdom) Tiff Needell	Ensign-Ford	G	12	Engine	23	
Ret	23	(Italy) Bruno Giacomelli	Alfa Romeo	G	11	Suspension	18	
Ret	6	(Argentina) Ricardo Zunino	Brabham-Ford	G	5	Gearbox	22	
Ret	30	(West Germany) Jochen Mass	Arrows-Ford	G	1	Spun off	13	
Ret	15	(France) Jean-Pierre Jabouille	Renault	MI	1	Clutch	5	
DNQ	17	(United Kingdom) Geoff Lees	Shadow-Ford	G				
DNQ	18	(Republic of Ireland) David Kennedy	Shadow-Ford	G				
DNQ	31	(United States) Eddie Cheever	Osella-Ford	G				

== Notes ==
- This was the Formula One World Championship debut for British driver Tiff Needell. Needell replaced Clay Regazzoni at Ensign Racing when the latter was injured during the United States Grand Prix West at the Long Beach Street Circuit.
- This was the 25th Grand Prix start for Alfa Romeo as a constructor.
- This was the 5th pole position for Williams.
- This was the 5th Grand Prix win for Ligier.

== Championship standings after the race ==
Drivers' Championship standings

	Pos	Driver	Points
	1	(France) René Arnoux	21
1	2	(Australia) Alan Jones	19
1	3	(Brazil) Nelson Piquet	18
	4	(France) Didier Pironi	17
	5	(Italy) Riccardo Patrese	7

Constructors' Championship standings

	Pos	Constructor	Points
2	1	(United Kingdom) Williams-Ford	25
2	2	(France) Ligier-Ford	23
2	3	(France) Renault	21
2	4	(United Kingdom) Brabham-Ford	18
	5	(United Kingdom) Arrows-Ford	8

- Note: Only the top five positions are included for both sets of standings.

Previous race: 1980 United States Grand Prix West	FIA Formula One World Championship; 1980 season	Next race: 1980 Monaco Grand Prix
Previous race: 1979 Belgian Grand Prix	Belgian Grand Prix	Next race: 1981 Belgian Grand Prix
