= 1980 Argentine Grand Prix =

- Race 1 of 14 in the 1980 Formula One season

Race details
- Date: 13 January 1980
- Official name: XVI Gran Premio de la Republica Argentina
- Location: Autodromo Municipal Ciudad de Buenos Aires, Buenos Aires, Argentina
- Course: Permanent racing facility
- Course length: 5.81 km (3.61 miles)
- Distance: 53 laps, 307.93 km (191.33 miles)
- Weather: Sunny, Very hot, Dry

Pole position
Driver	(Australia) Alan Jones	Williams-Ford
- Time: 1:44.17

Fastest lap
Driver	(Australia) Alan Jones	Williams-Ford
- Time: 1:50.45 on lap 5

Podium
First	(Australia) Alan Jones	Williams-Ford
Second	(Brazil) Nelson Piquet	Brabham-Ford
Third	(Finland) Keke Rosberg	Fittipaldi-Ford

The 1980 Argentine Grand Prix was a Formula One motor race held on 13 January 1980 at the Autodromo Municipal Ciudad de Buenos Aires in Argentina. It was the opening round of the 1980 Formula One season. The race was the 16th Argentine Grand Prix and the sixth to be held on the #15 variation of the Buenos Aires circuit. The race was held over 53 laps of the 5.81-kilometre (3.61 mi) circuit for a total race distance of 308 kilometres (191 mi).

The race was won by Australian driver Alan Jones driving a Williams FW07. It was Jones' sixth World Championship victory. Jones won by 24 seconds over Brazilian driver Nelson Piquet driving a Brabham BT49. It was a prelude of the season to come, as Jones and Piquet would fight out the 1980 season. Another future world champion, Finnish driver Keke Rosberg, finished third driving a Fittipaldi F7.

== Summary ==
This race was additionally notable for the drivers threatening to boycott the event because of the appalling state of the track, which was breaking up in many spots in the infield thanks to the intense heat of a Buenos Aires summer.

The immense grip of the aerodynamic suction created by the ground effect technology and the cars' tyres and a battle between Gilles Villeneuve (Ferrari 312T5), Alan Jones, Jacques Laffite (Ligier JS11/15) and Nelson Piquet, made it even more exciting due to the break-up of the track surface. Piquet finished second, Laffite retired with a blown engine and Villeneuve crashed going through the fast Tobogán complex due to a front suspension failure, although this was most likely exacerbated by a number of times he went off the very slippery track onto the sometimes bumpy and grassy run off area and consistently riding up the apex curbs of the Buenos Aires Autodrome.

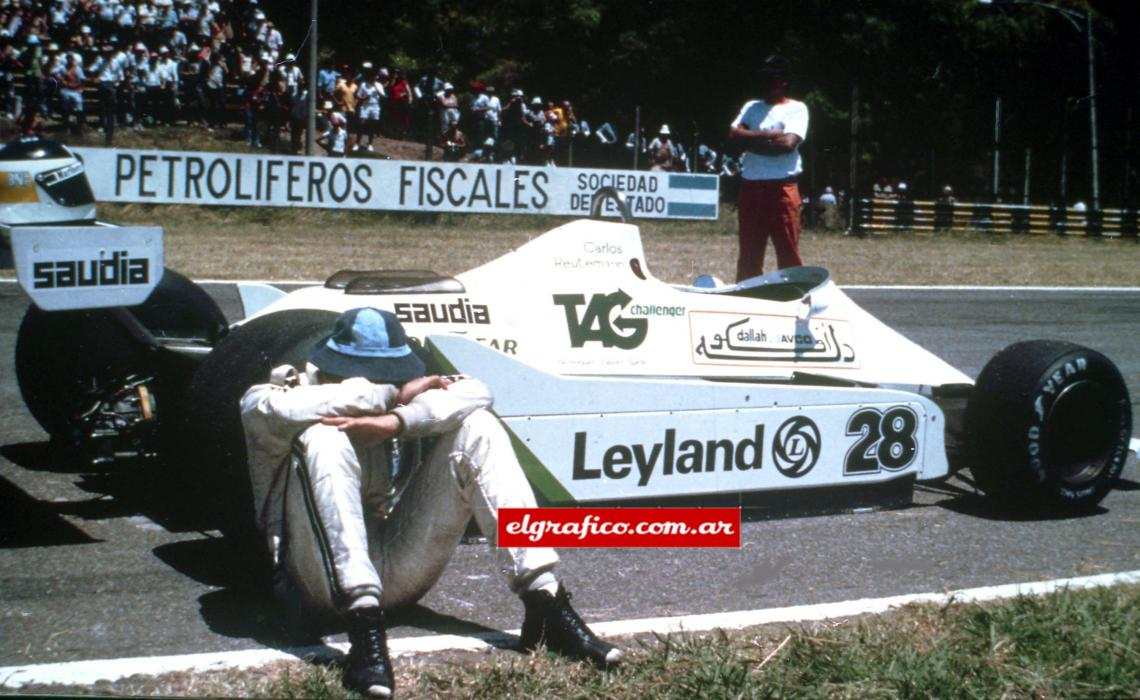
Argentine driver Carlos Reutemann crying after leaving the race prematurely

The grass took out home favorite Carlos Reutemann (who had jumped into 5th at the start from 10th) in his first drive with Williams, who attempted to pass Piquet going into the Ascari chicane after the two mile flat out section. Reutemann slid off the track trying to pass Piquet on the outside of the Ascari chicane onto the grass run-off area. The two radiators in Reutemann's Williams FW07 sucked in grass and were both blocked, and the engines (already running at higher temperatures than normal) were even more prone to blowing up there in Buenos Aires because of the hot weather- a common problem at the Argentine Grand Prix.

Multiple drivers spun off the track in the infield section, including Reutemann's teammate Jones, who had a short pitstop to clean his air intakes, but quickly returned to the battle. Reutemann also went into the pits to clean out his air intakes, but the damage was done and he retired with a blown engine soon after. Unsure if he would race again after 1980, the Argentinian was in fact so disconsolate that he sat motionless in his car for a few minutes, then got out of his car, sat on the track next to his car and burst into tears; the patriotic Reutemann had never won his home Grand Prix and would never do so.

The rate of attrition allowed Jody Scheckter into third place, but with just a handful of laps left suffered an engine failure in the Ferrari. This allowed Keke Rosberg to score his first ever podium in the same race as Piquet's first, and another future world champion Alain Prost (McLaren M29) scored a point on his Formula One début. It was a famous race of attrition on a terrible surface, where unusually the winner spun off twice and the runner-up once, and lap times were considerably slower than the previous year.

== Classification ==
=== Qualifying ===
Pos	No.	Driver	Constructor	Time	Gap
1	27	(Australia) Alan Jones	Williams-Ford	1:44.17	-
2	26	(France) Jacques Laffite	Ligier-Ford	1:44.44	+ 0.27
3	25	(France) Didier Pironi	Ligier-Ford	1:44.64	+ 0.47
4	5	(Brazil) Nelson Piquet	Brabham-Ford	1:45.02	+ 0.85
5	12	(Italy) Elio de Angelis	Lotus-Ford	1:45.46	+ 1.29
6	11	(United States) Mario Andretti	Lotus-Ford	1:45.78	+ 1.61
7	29	(Italy) Riccardo Patrese	Arrows-Ford	1:46.01	+ 1.84
8	2	(Canada) Gilles Villeneuve	Ferrari	1:46.07	+ 1.90
9	15	(France) Jean-Pierre Jabouille	Renault	1:46.15	+ 1.98
10	28	(Argentina) Carlos Reutemann	Williams-Ford	1:46.19	+ 2.02
11	1	(South Africa) Jody Scheckter	Ferrari	1:46.28	+ 2.11
12	8	(France) Alain Prost	McLaren-Ford	1:46.75	+ 2.58
13	21	(Finland) Keke Rosberg	Fittipaldi-Ford	1:46.97	+ 2.80
14	30	(West Germany) Jochen Mass	Arrows-Ford	1:47.05	+ 2.88
15	14	(Switzerland) Clay Regazzoni	Ensign-Ford	1:47.18	+ 3.01
16	6	(Argentina) Ricardo Zunino	Brabham-Ford	1:47.41	+ 3.24
17	7	(United Kingdom) John Watson	McLaren-Ford	1:47.70	+ 3.53
18	3	(France) Jean-Pierre Jarier	Tyrrell-Ford	1:47.83	+ 3.66
19	16	(France) René Arnoux	Renault	1:48.24	+ 4.07
20	23	(Italy) Bruno Giacomelli	Alfa Romeo	1:48.44	+ 4.27
21	9	(Switzerland) Marc Surer	ATS-Ford	1:48.86	+ 4.69
22	4	(Republic of Ireland) Derek Daly	Tyrrell-Ford	1:48.95	+ 4.78
23	22	(France) Patrick Depailler	Alfa Romeo	1:49.20	+ 5.03
24	20	(Brazil) Emerson Fittipaldi	Fittipaldi-Ford	1:49.42	+ 5.25
25	18	(Republic of Ireland) David Kennedy	Shadow-Ford	1:50.25	+ 6.08
26	10	(Netherlands) Jan Lammers	ATS-Ford	1:51.39	+ 7.21
27	17	(Sweden) Stefan Johansson	Shadow-Ford	1:51.57	+ 7.40
28	31	(United States) Eddie Cheever	Osella-Ford	1:54.21	+ 10.04

=== Race ===
Pos	No	Driver	Constructor	Tyre	Laps	Time/Retired	Grid	Points
1	27	(Australia) Alan Jones	Williams-Ford	G	53	1:43:24.38	1	9
2	5	(Brazil) Nelson Piquet	Brabham-Ford	G	53	+ 24.59	4	6
3	21	(Finland) Keke Rosberg	Fittipaldi-Ford	G	53	+ 1:18.64	13	4
4	4	(Republic of Ireland) Derek Daly	Tyrrell-Ford	G	53	+ 1:23.48	22	3
5	23	(Italy) Bruno Giacomelli	Alfa Romeo	G	52	+ 1 Lap	20	2
6	8	(France) Alain Prost	McLaren-Ford	G	52	+ 1 Lap	12	1
7	6	(Argentina) Ricardo Zunino	Brabham-Ford	G	51	+ 2 Laps	16	
Ret	22	(France) Patrick Depailler	Alfa Romeo	G	46	Engine	23	
Ret	1	(South Africa) Jody Scheckter	Ferrari	MI	45	Engine	11	
NC	14	(Switzerland) Clay Regazzoni	Ensign-Ford	G	44	+ 9 Laps	15	
NC	20	(Brazil) Emerson Fittipaldi	Fittipaldi-Ford	G	37	+ 16 Laps	24	
Ret	2	(Canada) Gilles Villeneuve	Ferrari	MI	36	Suspension	8	
Ret	26	(France) Jacques Laffite	Ligier-Ford	G	30	Engine	2	
Ret	29	(Italy) Riccardo Patrese	Arrows-Ford	G	27	Engine	7	
Ret	9	(Switzerland) Marc Surer	ATS-Ford	G	27	Fire	21	
Ret	11	(United States) Mario Andretti	Lotus-Ford	G	20	Fuel System	6	
Ret	30	(West Germany) Jochen Mass	Arrows-Ford	G	20	Gearbox	14	
Ret	28	(Argentina) Carlos Reutemann	Williams-Ford	G	12	Engine	10	
Ret	12	(Italy) Elio de Angelis	Lotus-Ford	G	7	Suspension	5	
Ret	7	(United Kingdom) John Watson	McLaren-Ford	G	5	Gearbox	17	
Ret	15	(France) Jean-Pierre Jabouille	Renault	MI	3	Gearbox	9	
Ret	16	(France) René Arnoux	Renault	MI	2	Suspension	19	
Ret	25	(France) Didier Pironi	Ligier-Ford	G	1	Engine	3	
Ret	3	(France) Jean-Pierre Jarier	Tyrrell-Ford	G	1	Collision	18	
DNQ	18	(Republic of Ireland) David Kennedy	Shadow-Ford	G				
DNQ	17	(Sweden) Stefan Johansson	Shadow-Ford	G				
DNQ	10	(Netherlands) Jan Lammers	ATS-Ford	G				
DNQ	31	(United States) Eddie Cheever	Osella-Ford	G				

== Notes ==
- This was the Formula One World Championship debut for Swedish driver Stefan Johansson, Irish driver David Kennedy and French driver and future World Champion Alain Prost.
- This was the 5th Grand Slam for an Australian driver.
- This was the 1st podium finish for a Finnish driver.
- This was the Formula One World Championship debut for Italian constructor Osella.

== Championship standings after the race ==
Drivers' Championship standings

Pos	Driver	Points
1	(Australia) Alan Jones	9
2	(Brazil) Nelson Piquet	6
3	(Finland) Keke Rosberg	4
4	(Republic of Ireland) Derek Daly	3
5	(Italy) Bruno Giacomelli	2

Constructors' Championship standings

Pos	Constructor	Points
1	(United Kingdom) Williams-Ford	9
2	(United Kingdom) Brabham-Ford	6
3	(Brazil) Fittipaldi-Ford	4
4	(United Kingdom) Tyrrell-Ford	3
5	(Italy) Alfa Romeo	2

- Note: Only the top five positions are included for both sets of standings.

Previous race: 1979 United States Grand Prix	FIA Formula One World Championship; 1980 season	Next race: 1980 Brazilian Grand Prix
Previous race: 1979 Argentine Grand Prix	Argentine Grand Prix	Next race: 1981 Argentine Grand Prix
