= 1980 South African Grand Prix =

- Race 3 of 14 in the 1980 Formula One season
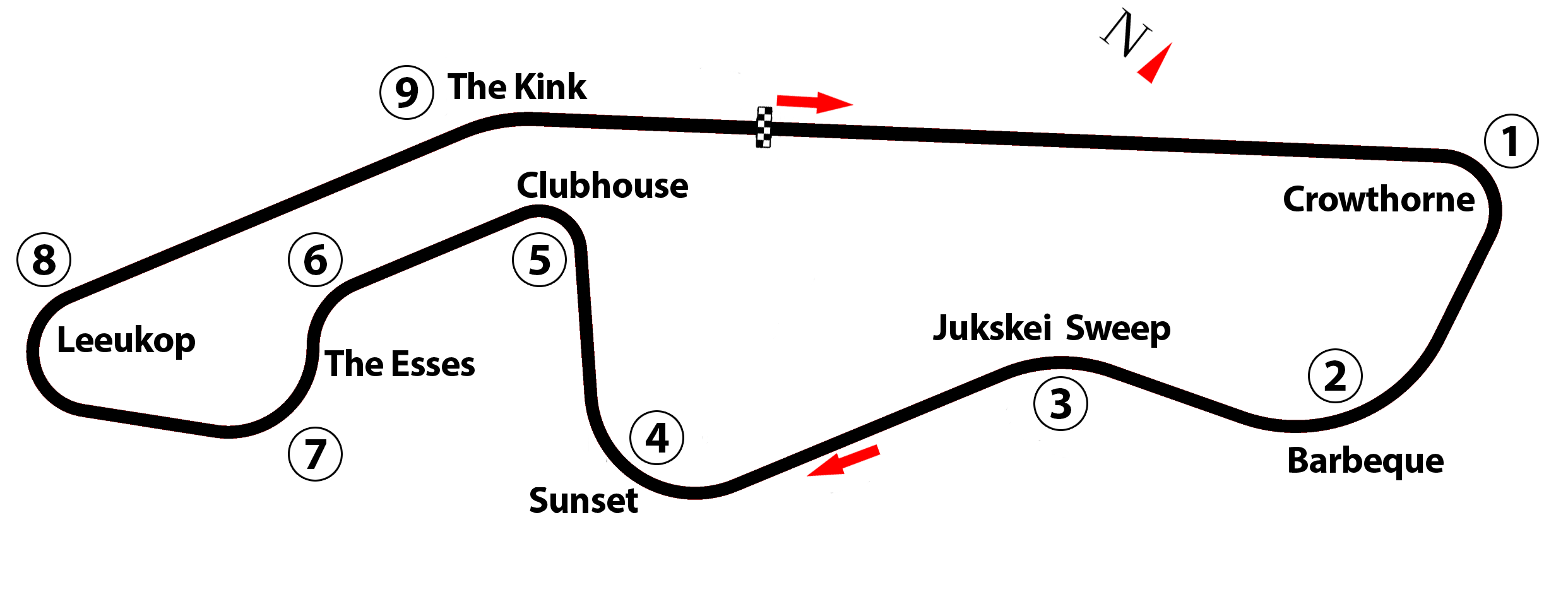

Race details
- Date: 1 March 1980
- Official name: XXVI South African Nashua Grand Prix
- Location: Kyalami; Transvaal Province, South Africa
- Course: Permanent racing facility
- Course length: 4.104 km (2.550 miles)
- Distance: 78 laps, 320.112 km (198.908 miles)
- Weather: Dry

Pole position
Driver	(France) Jean-Pierre Jabouille	Renault
- Time: 1:10.00

Fastest lap
Driver	(France) René Arnoux	Renault
- Time: 1:13.15 on lap 51

Podium
First	(France) René Arnoux	Renault
Second	(France) Jacques Laffite	Ligier-Ford
Third	(France) Didier Pironi	Ligier-Ford

The 1980 South African Grand Prix was a Formula One motor race held on 1 March 1980 at Kyalami in Gauteng, South Africa. It was the third round of the 1980 Formula One season. The race was the twenty-sixth South African Grand Prix and the fourteenth to be held at Kyalami. The race was held over 78 laps of the 4.104-kilometre circuit for a total race distance of 320 kilometres.

The race was won by French driver René Arnoux driving a Renault RE20. It was Arnoux' second World Championship victory adding to his win at the previous race the 1980 Brazilian Grand Prix. Arnoux won by 34 seconds over fellow French driver Jacques Laffite driving a Ligier JS11/15. Laffite's Ligier teammate Didier Pironi was third, completing an all-French podium. This was the first race since the 1968 United States Grand Prix to have three drivers from the same country on the podium; all three were also driving French-built cars.

The race was additionally notable because of two accidents during qualifying: French driver Alain Prost broke his wrist when he crashed his McLaren M29 at the Esses after a suspension failure, while Swiss driver Marc Surer badly injured his legs when he crashed the new ATS D4 at Crowthorne Corner at the end of the straight. Neither started the race, with Prost also missing the following race and Surer the next three races. ATS had only just downsized from two entries to one, but with Surer injured the former #2 driver Dutchman Jan Lammers rejoined the team. The new ATS D4 was too heavily damaged to be repaired and leaving Lammers to try and fail to qualify an ATS D3.

In common with the previous race in Brazil, altitude gave the turbo-charged Renaults a dominant edge in speed. Third on the grid, Nelson Piquet was almost two seconds behind in qualifying in his Brabham BT49. Jean-Pierre Jabouille and Arnoux led for much of the race until Jabouille punctured. The Ligiers climbed into the podium positions as championship leader Alan Jones retired his Williams FW07B. Piquet finished fourth ahead of Carlos Reutemann in the second Williams. The final point was claimed by Jochen Mass in his Arrows A3.

Thirteen cars finished the race although Patrick Depailler's Alfa Romeo 179 was too far behind to be classified. Geoff Lees was classified 13th as he crashed his Shadow DN11 late in the race. This would be Shadow's last Grand Prix start (not counting the non-championship Spanish GP three months later).

Arnoux became the new championship points leader, five points up on Jones and nine ahead of Piquet. Similarly Renault now led the constructors points over Williams.

== Classification ==
=== Qualifying ===
Pos	No.	Driver	Constructor	Time	Gap
1	15	(France) Jean-Pierre Jabouille	Renault	1:10.00	-
2	16	(France) René Arnoux	Renault	1:10.21	+ 0.11
3	5	(Brazil) Nelson Piquet	Brabham-Ford	1:11.87	+ 1.87
4	26	(France) Jacques Laffite	Ligier-Ford	1:11.88	+ 1.88
5	25	(France) Didier Pironi	Ligier-Ford	1:12.11	+ 2.11
6	28	(Argentina) Carlos Reutemann	Williams-Ford	1:12.15	+ 2.15
7	22	(France) Patrick Depailler	Alfa Romeo	1:12.16	+ 2.16
8	27	(Australia) Alan Jones	Williams-Ford	1:12.23	+ 2.23
9	1	(South Africa) Jody Scheckter	Ferrari	1:12.32	+ 2.32
10	2	(Canada) Gilles Villeneuve	Ferrari	1:12.38	+ 2.38
11	29	(Italy) Riccardo Patrese	Arrows-Ford	1:12.50	+ 2.50
12	23	(Italy) Bruno Giacomelli	Alfa Romeo	1:12.51	+ 2.51
13	3	(France) Jean-Pierre Jarier	Tyrrell-Ford	1:12.70	+ 2.70
14	12	(Italy) Elio de Angelis	Lotus-Ford	1:12.74	+ 2.74
15	11	(United States) Mario Andretti	Lotus-Ford	1:12.93	+ 2.93
16	4	(Republic of Ireland) Derek Daly	Tyrrell-Ford	1:13.04	+ 3.04
17	6	(Argentina) Ricardo Zunino	Brabham-Ford	1:13.05	+ 3.05
18	20	(Brazil) Emerson Fittipaldi	Fittipaldi-Ford	1:13.23	+ 3.23
19	30	(West Germany) Jochen Mass	Arrows-Ford	1:13.25	+ 3.25
20	14	(Switzerland) Clay Regazzoni	Ensign-Ford	1:13.25	+ 3.25
21	7	(United Kingdom) John Watson	McLaren-Ford	1:13.61	+ 3.61
22	8	(France) Alain Prost	McLaren-Ford	1:13.76	+ 3.76
23	31	(United States) Eddie Cheever	Osella-Ford	1:13.83	+ 3.83
24	21	(Finland) Keke Rosberg	Fittipaldi-Ford	1:13.84	+ 3.84
25	17	(United Kingdom) Geoff Lees	Shadow-Ford	1:14.46	+ 4.46
26	9	(Switzerland) Marc Surer	ATS-Ford	1:14.54	+ 4.54
27	18	(Republic of Ireland) David Kennedy	Shadow-Ford	1:15.23	+ 5.23
28	10	(Netherlands) Jan Lammers	ATS-Ford	1:15.29	+ 5.29

=== Race ===
Pos	No	Driver	Constructor	Tyre	Laps	Time/Retired	Grid	Points
1	16	(France) René Arnoux	Renault	MI	78	1:36:52.54	2	9
2	26	(France) Jacques Laffite	Ligier-Ford	G	78	+ 34.07	4	6
3	25	(France) Didier Pironi	Ligier-Ford	G	78	+ 52.49	5	4
4	5	(Brazil) Nelson Piquet	Brabham-Ford	G	78	+ 1:01.02	3	3
5	28	(Argentina) Carlos Reutemann	Williams-Ford	G	77	+ 1 Lap	6	2
6	30	(West Germany) Jochen Mass	Arrows-Ford	G	77	+ 1 Lap	19	1
7	3	(France) Jean-Pierre Jarier	Tyrrell-Ford	G	77	+ 1 Lap	13	
8	20	(Brazil) Emerson Fittipaldi	Fittipaldi-Ford	G	77	+ 1 Lap	18	
9	14	(Switzerland) Clay Regazzoni	Ensign-Ford	G	77	+ 1 Lap	20	
10	6	(Argentina) Ricardo Zunino	Brabham-Ford	G	77	+ 1 Lap	17	
11	7	(United Kingdom) John Watson	McLaren-Ford	G	76	+ 2 Laps	21	
12	11	(United States) Mario Andretti	Lotus-Ford	G	76	+ 2 Laps	15	
13	17	(United Kingdom) Geoff Lees	Shadow-Ford	G	70	Suspension	24	
Ret	23	(Italy) Bruno Giacomelli	Alfa Romeo	G	69	Engine	12	
Ret	15	(France) Jean-Pierre Jabouille	Renault	MI	61	Puncture	1	
Ret	4	(Republic of Ireland) Derek Daly	Tyrrell-Ford	G	61	Puncture	16	
Ret	21	(Finland) Keke Rosberg	Fittipaldi-Ford	G	58	Accident	23	
NC	22	(France) Patrick Depailler	Alfa Romeo	G	53	+ 25 Laps	7	
Ret	27	(Australia) Alan Jones	Williams-Ford	G	34	Gearbox	8	
Ret	2	(Canada) Gilles Villeneuve	Ferrari	MI	31	Transmission	10	
Ret	1	(South Africa) Jody Scheckter	Ferrari	MI	14	Engine	9	
Ret	29	(Italy) Riccardo Patrese	Arrows-Ford	G	10	Spun Off	11	
Ret	31	(United States) Eddie Cheever	Osella-Ford	G	8	Spun Off	22	
Ret	12	(Italy) Elio de Angelis	Lotus-Ford	G	1	Spun Off	14	
DNS	8	(France) Alain Prost	McLaren-Ford	G		Accident		
DNS	9	(Switzerland) Marc Surer	ATS-Ford	G		Accident		
DNQ	18	(Republic of Ireland) David Kennedy	Shadow-Ford	G				
DNQ	10	(Netherlands) Jan Lammers	ATS-Ford	G				

== Championship standings after the race ==
Drivers' Championship standings

	Pos	Driver	Points
1	1	(France) René Arnoux	18
1	2	(Australia) Alan Jones	13
	3	(Brazil) Nelson Piquet	9
2	4	(France) Didier Pironi	7
1	5	(Italy) Elio de Angelis	6

Constructors' Championship standings

	Pos	Constructor	Points
1	1	(France) Renault	18
1	2	(United Kingdom) Williams-Ford	15
3	3	(France) Ligier-Ford	13
1	4	(United Kingdom) Brabham-Ford	9
1	5	(United Kingdom) Lotus-Ford	6

- Note: Only the top five positions are included for both sets of standings.

Previous race: 1980 Brazilian Grand Prix	FIA Formula One World Championship; 1980 season	Next race: 1980 United States Grand Prix West
Previous race: 1979 South African Grand Prix	South African Grand Prix	Next race: 1981 South African Grand Prix
