= 1980 British Grand Prix =

- Race 8 of 14 in the 1980 Formula One season

Race details
- Date: 13 July 1980
- Official name: XXXIII Marlboro British Grand Prix
- Location: Brands Hatch, Kent, Great Britain
- Course: Permanent racing facility
- Course length: 4.207 km (2.614 miles)
- Distance: 76 laps, 319.732 km (198.672 miles)

Pole position
Driver	(France) Didier Pironi	Ligier-Ford
- Time: 1:11.004

Fastest lap
Driver	(France) Didier Pironi	Ligier-Ford
- Time: 1:12.368 on lap 54

Podium
First	(Australia) Alan Jones	Williams-Ford
Second	(Brazil) Nelson Piquet	Brabham-Ford
Third	(Argentina) Carlos Reutemann	Williams-Ford

The 1980 British Grand Prix (formally the XXXIII Marlboro British Grand Prix) was a Formula One motor race held at Brands Hatch on 13 July 1980. It was the eighth round of the 1980 Formula One season. The race was held over 76 laps of the 4.207-km (2.614-mile) circuit for a total race distance of 319.73 km (198.67 miles).

The race was won by Australian driver, Alan Jones driving a Williams FW07B. The win was Jones' eighth Formula One Grand Prix victory and his fourth of the year. Including the non-championship Spanish Grand Prix it was Jones' third victory in a row as he built his charge towards becoming the 1980 World Drivers' Champion. Jones won by eleven seconds over the man becoming his arch-rival, Brazilian driver Nelson Piquet driving a Brabham BT49. Third, and the only other car to finish on the lead lap, was Jones' Williams Grand Prix Engineering teammate, Argentine driver Carlos Reutemann.

== Report ==
=== Background ===
In the two weeks between the French and British Grands Prix, Brabham decided to replace Ricardo Zunino with Mexican driver Héctor Rebaque, while the Shadow team closed down. There were still 27 cars on the entry list, as RAM Racing entered year-old Williams FW07s for Rupert Keegan and South African female racer Desiré Wilson.

=== Qualifying ===
For the third consecutive race, a Ligier driver took pole position, Didier Pironi setting a time some 5.8 seconds faster than the pole time set by Ronnie Peterson at the previous Grand Prix at Brands Hatch two years before. Pironi's teammate Jacques Laffite was alongside on the front row, while the works Williams filled the second row with championship leader Alan Jones ahead of Carlos Reutemann. On the third row were Nelson Piquet in the Brabham and Bruno Giacomelli in the Alfa Romeo, and on the fourth were Alain Prost in the McLaren and Patrick Depailler in the second Alfa Romeo. Mario Andretti in the Lotus and Derek Daly in the Tyrrell completed the top ten.

The Renaults and Ferraris had issues with their Michelin tyres, and Jean-Pierre Jabouille and René Arnoux could only manage 13th and 16th respectively for the French team, while Gilles Villeneuve and reigning champion Jody Scheckter struggled to 19th and 23rd respectively for the Italian outfit, and were both out-qualified by Keegan's private Williams. Wilson failed to qualify in the other private Williams.

=== Race ===
At the start, Pironi led with Laffite holding off Jones and Piquet passing Reutemann for fourth. Pironi held a comfortable lead until lap 19, when he suffered a deflating front tyre followed by a long pit stop to replace it. Laffite led until he too suffered a deflating tyre, causing him to spin off into catch fencing at Hawthorn Bend on lap 31. Thereafter, Jones retained a comfortable advantage over Piquet and Reutemann, while Pironi made a charge from the back of the field, reaching fifth before suffering another tyre failure on lap 64. It was later established that the Ligiers' problems were caused by their wheel rims cracking.

Jones eventually took the chequered flag 11 seconds ahead of Piquet, for his fourth victory of the season and his third in succession (including the Spanish Grand Prix, which was subsequently stripped of its World Championship status). Reutemann, the last man on the lead lap, finished 2.2 seconds behind Piquet, with the minor points going to Daly, his Tyrrell teammate Jean-Pierre Jarier, and Prost.

In the Drivers' Championship, Jones doubled his lead over Piquet to six points, while in the Constructors' Championship Williams moved 18 points clear of Ligier.

This race turned out to be the last for Depailler, who died three weeks later while testing at Hockenheim ahead of the German Grand Prix.

== Classification ==
=== Qualifying ===
Pos	No.	Driver	Constructor	Time	Gap
1	25	(France) Didier Pironi	Ligier-Ford	1:11.004	-
2	26	(France) Jacques Laffite	Ligier-Ford	1:11.395	+ 0.391
3	27	(Australia) Alan Jones	Williams-Ford	1:11.609	+ 0.605
4	28	(Argentina) Carlos Reutemann	Williams-Ford	1:11.629	+ 0.625
5	5	(Brazil) Nelson Piquet	Brabham-Ford	1:11.634	+ 0.630
6	23	(Italy) Bruno Giacomelli	Alfa Romeo	1:12.128	+ 1.124
7	8	(France) Alain Prost	McLaren-Ford	1:12.634	+ 1.630
8	22	(France) Patrick Depailler	Alfa Romeo	1:13.189	+ 2.185
9	11	(United States) Mario Andretti	Lotus-Ford	1:13.400	+ 2.396
10	4	(Republic of Ireland) Derek Daly	Tyrrell-Ford	1:13.469	+ 2.465
11	3	(France) Jean-Pierre Jarier	Tyrrell-Ford	1:13.666	+ 2.662
12	7	(United Kingdom) John Watson	McLaren-Ford	1:13.717	+ 2.713
13	15	(France) Jean-Pierre Jabouille	Renault	1:13.749	+ 2.745
14	12	(Italy) Elio de Angelis	Lotus-Ford	1:13.859	+ 2.855
15	9	(Switzerland) Marc Surer	ATS-Ford	1:13.953	+ 2.949
16	16	(France) René Arnoux	Renault	1:13.967	+ 2.963
17	6	(Mexico) Héctor Rebaque	Brabham-Ford	1:14.226	+ 3.222
18	50	(United Kingdom) Rupert Keegan	Williams-Ford	1:14.236	+ 3.232
19	2	(Canada) Gilles Villeneuve	Ferrari	1:14.296	+ 3.292
20	31	(United States) Eddie Cheever	Osella-Ford	1:14.517	+ 3.513
21	29	(Italy) Riccardo Patrese	Arrows-Ford	1:14.560	+ 3.556
22	20	(Brazil) Emerson Fittipaldi	Fittipaldi-Ford	1:14.580	+ 3.576
23	1	(South Africa) Jody Scheckter	Ferrari	1:15.370	+ 4.366
24	30	(West Germany) Jochen Mass	Arrows-Ford	1:15.423	+ 4.419
25	14	(Netherlands) Jan Lammers	Ensign-Ford	1:15.596	+ 4.592
26	21	(Finland) Keke Rosberg	Fittipaldi-Ford	1:15.845	+ 4.841
27	43	(South Africa) Desiré Wilson	Williams-Ford	1:16.315	+ 5.311

=== Race ===
Pos	No	Driver	Constructor	Tyre	Laps	Time/Retired	Grid	Points
1	27	(Australia) Alan Jones	Williams-Ford	G	76	1:34:49.228	3	9
2	5	(Brazil) Nelson Piquet	Brabham-Ford	G	76	+ 11.007	5	6
3	28	(Argentina) Carlos Reutemann	Williams-Ford	G	76	+ 13.285	4	4
4	4	(Republic of Ireland) Derek Daly	Tyrrell-Ford	G	75	+ 1 lap	10	3
5	3	(France) Jean-Pierre Jarier	Tyrrell-Ford	G	75	+ 1 lap	11	2
6	8	(France) Alain Prost	McLaren-Ford	G	75	+ 1 lap	7	1
7	6	(Mexico) Héctor Rebaque	Brabham-Ford	G	74	+ 2 laps	17	
8	7	(United Kingdom) John Watson	McLaren-Ford	G	74	Engine	12	
9	29	(Italy) Riccardo Patrese	Arrows-Ford	G	73	+ 3 laps	21	
10	1	(South Africa) Jody Scheckter	Ferrari	MI	73	+ 3 laps	23	
11	50	(United Kingdom) Rupert Keegan	Williams-Ford	G	73	+ 3 laps	18	
12	20	(Brazil) Emerson Fittipaldi	Fittipaldi-Ford	G	72	+ 4 laps	22	
13	30	(West Germany) Jochen Mass	Arrows-Ford	G	69	+ 7 laps	24	
NC	16	(France) René Arnoux	Renault	MI	67	+ 9 laps	16	
Ret	25	(France) Didier Pironi	Ligier-Ford	G	63	Tyre	1	
Ret	9	(Switzerland) Marc Surer	ATS-Ford	G	59	Engine	15	
Ret	11	(United States) Mario Andretti	Lotus-Ford	G	57	Gearbox	9	
Ret	23	(Italy) Bruno Giacomelli	Alfa Romeo	G	42	Spun off	6	
Ret	2	(Canada) Gilles Villeneuve	Ferrari	MI	35	Engine	19	
Ret	26	(France) Jacques Laffite	Ligier-Ford	G	30	Tyre	2	
Ret	22	(France) Patrick Depailler	Alfa Romeo	G	27	Engine	8	
Ret	31	(United States) Eddie Cheever	Osella-Ford	G	17	Suspension	20	
Ret	12	(Italy) Elio de Angelis	Lotus-Ford	G	16	Suspension	14	
Ret	15	(France) Jean-Pierre Jabouille	Renault	MI	4	Engine	13	
DNQ	14	(Netherlands) Jan Lammers	Ensign-Ford	G				
DNQ	21	(Finland) Keke Rosberg	Fittipaldi-Ford	G				
DNQ	43	(South Africa) Desiré Wilson	Williams-Ford	G				

== Notes ==
- This was the Formula One World Championship debut for South African driver Desiré Wilson - the fourth woman to enter into Formula One after Maria Teresa de Filippis, Lella Lombardi and Divina Galica.

== Championship standings after the race ==
Drivers' Championship standings

Pos	Driver	Points
1	(Australia) Alan Jones	37
2	(Brazil) Nelson Piquet	31
3	(France) René Arnoux	23
4	(France) Didier Pironi	23
5	(Argentina) Carlos Reutemann	20

Constructors' Championship standings

Pos	Constructor	Points
1	(United Kingdom) Williams-Ford	57
2	(France) Ligier-Ford	39
3	(United Kingdom) Brabham-Ford	31
4	(France) Renault	23
5	(United Kingdom) Arrows-Ford	11

- Note: Only the top five positions are included for both sets of standings.

Previous race: 1980 French Grand Prix	FIA Formula One World Championship; 1980 season	Next race: 1980 German Grand Prix
Previous race: 1979 British Grand Prix	British Grand Prix	Next race: 1981 British Grand Prix
