= 1980 German Grand Prix =

- Race 9 of 14 in the 1980 Formula One season
- Hockenheim in 1980

Race details
- Date: 10 August 1980
- Official name: XLII Großer Preis von Deutschland
- Location: Hockenheimring, Hockenheim, West Germany
- Course: Permanent racing facility
- Course length: 6.790 km (4.219 miles)
- Distance: 45 laps, 305.505 km (189.81 miles)
- Weather: Overcast, Dry

Pole position
Driver	(Australia) Alan Jones	Williams-Ford
- Time: 1:45.85

Fastest lap
Driver	(Australia) Alan Jones	Williams-Ford
- Time: 1:48.49 on lap 43

Podium
First	(France) Jacques Laffite	Ligier-Ford
Second	(Argentina) Carlos Reutemann	Williams-Ford
Third	(Australia) Alan Jones	Williams-Ford

The 1980 German Grand Prix was a Formula One motor race held at the Hockenheimring on 10 August 1980. It was the ninth round of the 1980 Formula One season. The race was the 42nd German Grand Prix and the fifth to be held at Hockenheim. The race was held over 45 laps of the 6.790 kilometres (4.219 mi) circuit for a total race distance of 305.505 kilometres (189.832 mi).

The race was won by Jacques Laffite driving a Ligier. Laffite won by three seconds over Carlos Reutemann driving a Williams. Third was Reutemann's teammate Alan Jones.

== Report ==
The very high speed Hockenheimring favored more powerful turbocharged engines, and was expected to be a circuit suited to Renault. In qualifying, Jones managed to beat Renault driver Jean-Pierre Jabouille to the pole by four-hundredths of a second, with an average speed of 231 km/h (144 mph). They were followed by René Arnoux in the other Renault, Jones's Argentine teammate Carlos Reutemann, French driver Jacques Laffite, Brazilian Nelson Piquet (Brabham), Frenchman Didier Pironi (Ligier), and Finn Keke Rosberg in a Fittipaldi.

Jean-Pierre Jabouille led early with Arnoux third behind Jones. Both Renaults suffered engine failures within a lap of each other leaving Jones to lead until he made a pitstop following a tyre puncture after the second chicane, dropping him behind Laffite and Reutemann.

Laffite won the race, his first of 1980, and fourth overall. He was followed by Carlos Reutemann and Alan Jones. Nelson Piquet finished fourth in his Brabham ahead of the only Alfa Romeo entered, that of Bruno Giacomelli. Canadian Gilles Villeneuve collected just his fourth point for the year in the blighted Ferrari. In his 100th race start, West German driver Jochen Mass finished eighth in his Arrows, behind Mario Andretti (Lotus).

Jones expanded his points lead over Piquet to seven. Reutemann was up to third, 15 points behind and Laffite was up to fourth, 16 points down, both drivers leapfrogging Arnoux, now fifth 2 points behind Laffite. Williams' lead over Ligier in the Constructors' Championship was now 19 points, with the rest over 30 points behind.

== Classification ==
=== Qualifying ===
Pos	No.	Driver	Constructor	Time	Gap
1	27	(Australia) Alan Jones	Williams-Ford	1:45.85	-
2	15	(France) Jean-Pierre Jabouille	Renault	1:45.89	+ 0.04
3	16	(France) René Arnoux	Renault	1:46.00	+ 0.15
4	28	(Argentina) Carlos Reutemann	Williams-Ford	1:46.14	+ 0.29
5	26	(France) Jacques Laffite	Ligier-Ford	1:46.78	+ 0.93
6	5	(Brazil) Nelson Piquet	Brabham-Ford	1:46.90	+ 1.05
7	25	(France) Didier Pironi	Ligier-Ford	1:47.20	+ 1.35
8	21	(Finland) Keke Rosberg	Fittipaldi-Ford	1:47.64	+ 1.89
9	11	(United States) Mario Andretti	Lotus-Ford	1:48.45	+ 2.60
10	29	(Italy) Riccardo Patrese	Arrows-Ford	1:48.58	+ 2.73
11	12	(Italy) Elio de Angelis	Lotus-Ford	1:48.59	+ 2.74
12	20	(Brazil) Emerson Fittipaldi	Fittipaldi-Ford	1:48.70	+ 2.85
13	9	(Switzerland) Marc Surer	ATS-Ford	1:48.72	+ 2.87
14	8	(France) Alain Prost	McLaren-Ford	1:48.75	+ 2.90
15	6	(Mexico) Héctor Rebaque	Brabham-Ford	1:48.78	+ 2.93
16	2	(Canada) Gilles Villeneuve	Ferrari	1:48.86	+ 3.01
17	30	(West Germany) Jochen Mass	Arrows-Ford	1:48.93	+ 3.08
18	31	(United States) Eddie Cheever	Osella-Ford	1:49.06	+ 3.21
19	23	(Italy) Bruno Giacomelli	Alfa Romeo	1:49.11	+ 3.26
20	7	(United Kingdom) John Watson	McLaren-Ford	1:49.26	+ 3.41
21	1	(South Africa) Jody Scheckter	Ferrari	1:49.35	+ 3.50
22	4	(Republic of Ireland) Derek Daly	Tyrrell-Ford	1:49.51	+ 3.66
23	3	(France) Jean-Pierre Jarier	Tyrrell-Ford	1:49.52	+ 3.67
24	14	(Netherlands) Jan Lammers	Ensign-Ford	1:50.30	+ 4.45
25	50	(United Kingdom) Rupert Keegan	Williams-Ford	1:50.75	+ 4.90
26	10	(Austria) Harald Ertl	ATS-Ford	1:53.13	+ 7.28

=== Race ===
Pos	No	Driver	Constructor	Tyre	Laps	Time/Retired	Grid	Points
1	26	(France) Jacques Laffite	Ligier-Ford	G	45	1:23:59.73	5	9
2	28	(Argentina) Carlos Reutemann	Williams-Ford	G	45	+3.19 secs	4	6
3	27	(Australia) Alan Jones	Williams-Ford	G	45	+43.53 secs	1	4
4	5	(Brazil) Nelson Piquet	Brabham-Ford	G	45	+44.48 secs	6	3
5	23	(Italy) Bruno Giacomelli	Alfa Romeo	G	45	+1:16.49 secs	19	2
6	2	(Canada) Gilles Villeneuve	Ferrari	MI	45	+1:28.72 secs	16	1
7	11	(United States) Mario Andretti	Lotus-Ford	G	45	+1:33.01 secs	9	
8	30	(West Germany) Jochen Mass	Arrows-Ford	G	45	+1:47.75 sec	17	
9	29	(Italy) Riccardo Patrese	Arrows-Ford	G	44	+1 Lap	10	
10	4	(Republic of Ireland) Derek Daly	Tyrrell-Ford	G	44	+1 Lap	22	
11	8	(France) Alain Prost	McLaren-Ford	G	44	+1 Lap	14	
12	9	(Switzerland) Marc Surer	ATS-Ford	G	44	+1 Lap	13	
13	1	(South Africa) Jody Scheckter	Ferrari	MI	44	+1 Lap	21	
14	14	(Netherlands) Jan Lammers	Ensign-Ford	G	44	+1 Lap	24	
15	3	(France) Jean-Pierre Jarier	Tyrrell-Ford	G	44	+1 Lap	23	
16	12	(Italy) Elio de Angelis	Lotus-Ford	G	43	Wheel Bearing	11	
Ret	7	(United Kingdom) John Watson	McLaren-Ford	G	39	Engine	20	
Ret	15	(France) Jean-Pierre Jabouille	Renault	MI	27	Engine	2	
Ret	16	(France) René Arnoux	Renault	MI	26	Engine	3	
Ret	31	(United States) Eddie Cheever	Osella-Ford	G	23	Gearbox	18	
Ret	25	(France) Didier Pironi	Ligier-Ford	G	18	Transmission	7	
Ret	20	(Brazil) Emerson Fittipaldi	Fittipaldi-Ford	G	18	Brakes	12	
Ret	21	(Finland) Keke Rosberg	Fittipaldi-Ford	G	8	Wheel Bearing	8	
Ret	6	(Mexico) Héctor Rebaque	Brabham-Ford	G	4	Gearbox	15	
DNQ	50	(United Kingdom) Rupert Keegan	Williams-Ford	G				
DNQ	10	(Austria) Harald Ertl	ATS-Ford	G				

== Championship standings after the race ==
Drivers' Championship standings

	Pos	Driver	Points
	1	(Australia) **Alan Jones***	41
	2	(Brazil) **Nelson Piquet***	34
2	3	(Argentina) **Carlos Reutemann***	26
2	4	(France) **Jacques Laffite***	25
2	5	(France) **René Arnoux***	23

Constructors' Championship standings

Pos	Constructor	Points
1	(United Kingdom) **Williams-Ford***	67
2	(France) **Ligier-Ford***	48
3	(United Kingdom) **Brabham-Ford***	34
4	(France) **Renault***	23
5	(United Kingdom) Arrows-Ford	11

- Note: Only the top five positions are included for both sets of standings.
- Competitors in bold and marked with an asterisk still had a theoretical chance of becoming World Champion.

Previous race: 1980 British Grand Prix	FIA Formula One World Championship; 1980 season	Next race: 1980 Austrian Grand Prix
Previous race: 1979 German Grand Prix	German Grand Prix	Next race: 1981 German Grand Prix
