= Tyrrell 011 =

Formula One racing car

Tyrrell 011 Tyrrell 011B
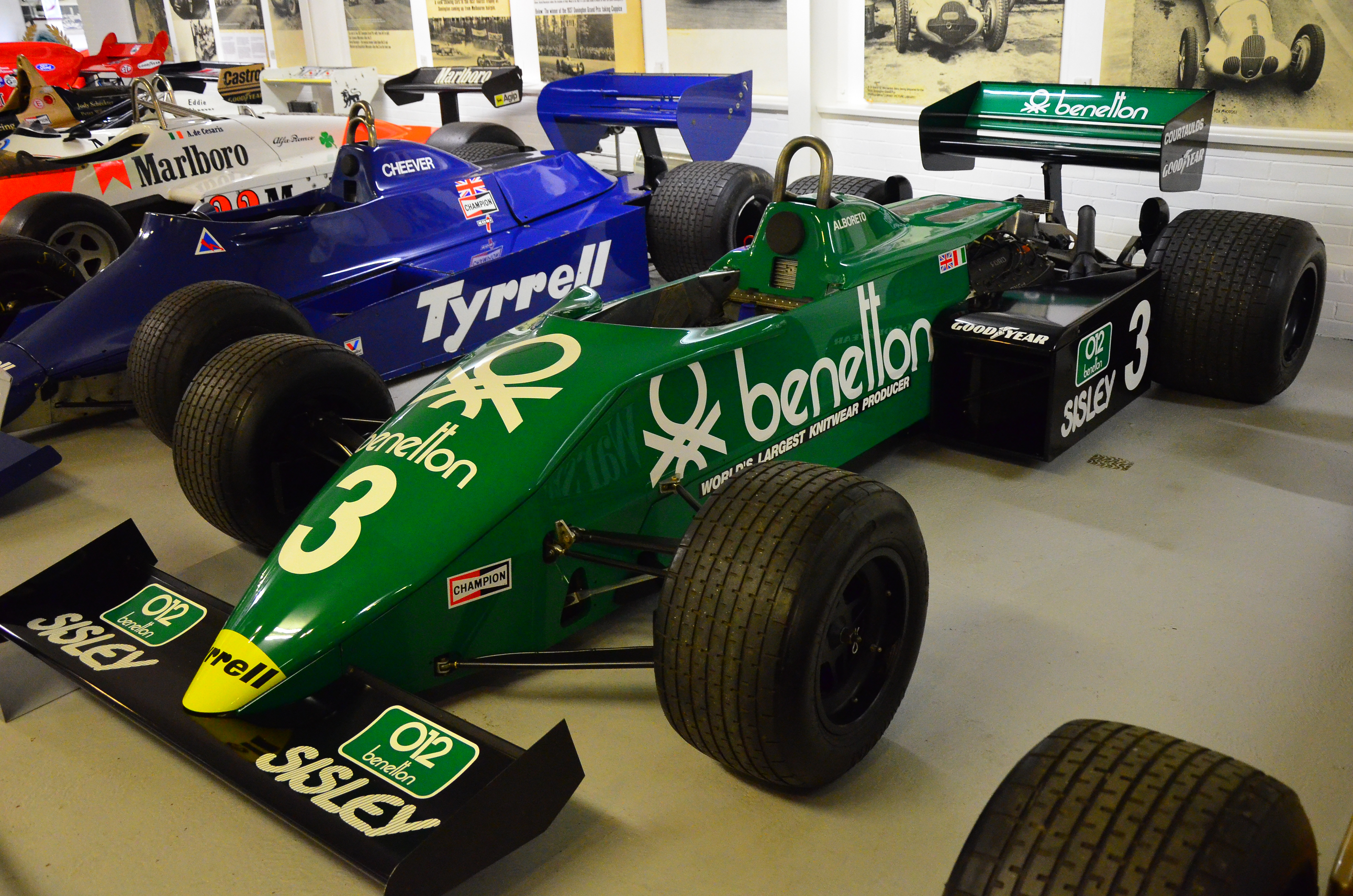
- Category: Formula One
- Constructor: Tyrrell Racing Organisation
- Designers: Maurice Philippe (Technical Director); Brian Lisles (Chief Designer)
- Predecessor: 010
- Successor: 012

Technical specifications
- Chassis: Aluminium monocoque
- Suspension (front): Double wishbones
- Suspension (rear): Double wishbones
- Axle track: Front: 1,727 mm (68.0 in); Rear: 1,515 mm (59.6 in)
- Wheelbase: 2,692 mm (106.0 in)
- Engine: Cosworth DFV, 2,993 cc (182.6 cu in), 90° V8, NA, mid-engine, longitudinally mounted
- Transmission: Hewland FGA 400 5-speed manual
- Weight: 589 kg (1,298.5 lb)
- Fuel: Valvoline
- Tyres: Avon (1981 only); Goodyear

Competition history
- Notable entrants: Tyrrell Racing Team; Benetton Team Tyrrell (1983)
- Notable drivers: (United States) Eddie Cheever (Italy) Michele Alboreto (United Kingdom) Brian Henton (Sweden) Slim Borgudd (United States) Danny Sullivan
- Debut: 1981 German Grand Prix
- First win: 1982 Caesars Palace Grand Prix
- Last win: 1983 Detroit Grand Prix
- Last event: 1983 Italian Grand Prix
Races	Wins	Poles	F/Laps
35	2	0	2
- Constructors' Championships: 0
- Drivers' Championships: 0
- Unless otherwise stated, all data refer to Formula One World Championship Grands Prix only.

The Tyrrell 011 was a Formula One car designed by Maurice Philippe for the Tyrrell Racing Organisation.

== Design ==
The 011 was powered by a Cosworth DFV engine and initially ran on Avon tyres before the team switched into Goodyear rubber.

=== Upgrades ===
For 1982, Tyrrell made a minor modification to the 011 by redesigning the ground effect and removing the front wing.

For 1983, Tyrrell upgraded the 011 into a derivative version of the car, the 011B. The differences were the removal of the ground effect, smaller sidepods, open engine cover and revised front and rear wings.

== Racing history ==
It made its debut in the hands of American Eddie Cheever at the 1981 German Grand Prix where he qualified 18th and finished the race in the points with 5th place.

The 011 raced in three seasons of Formula One (1981 - 1983) although its only full season was 1982. Drivers for Tyrrell in that time included Cheever, Michele Alboreto, Brian Henton, Slim Borgudd and Danny Sullivan. Tyrrell were able to win 2 races with the 011, both by Alboreto. The first win at the 1982 Caesars Palace Grand Prix was also Alboreto's first and the last 011 victory was the 1983 Detroit Grand Prix. This race was also the last of 155 Grand Prix wins for the Cosworth DFV engine which had made its F1 debut 16 years earlier in 1967.

The 011 was replaced two-thirds of the way through the 1983 season by the Tyrrell 012.

== Livery ==
Throughout the three seasons, the 011 was painted in different liveries and gained numerous sponsorships, most notably the green and black in colour sponsored by the Italian fashion brand Benetton of the 1983 cars.

== Gallery ==
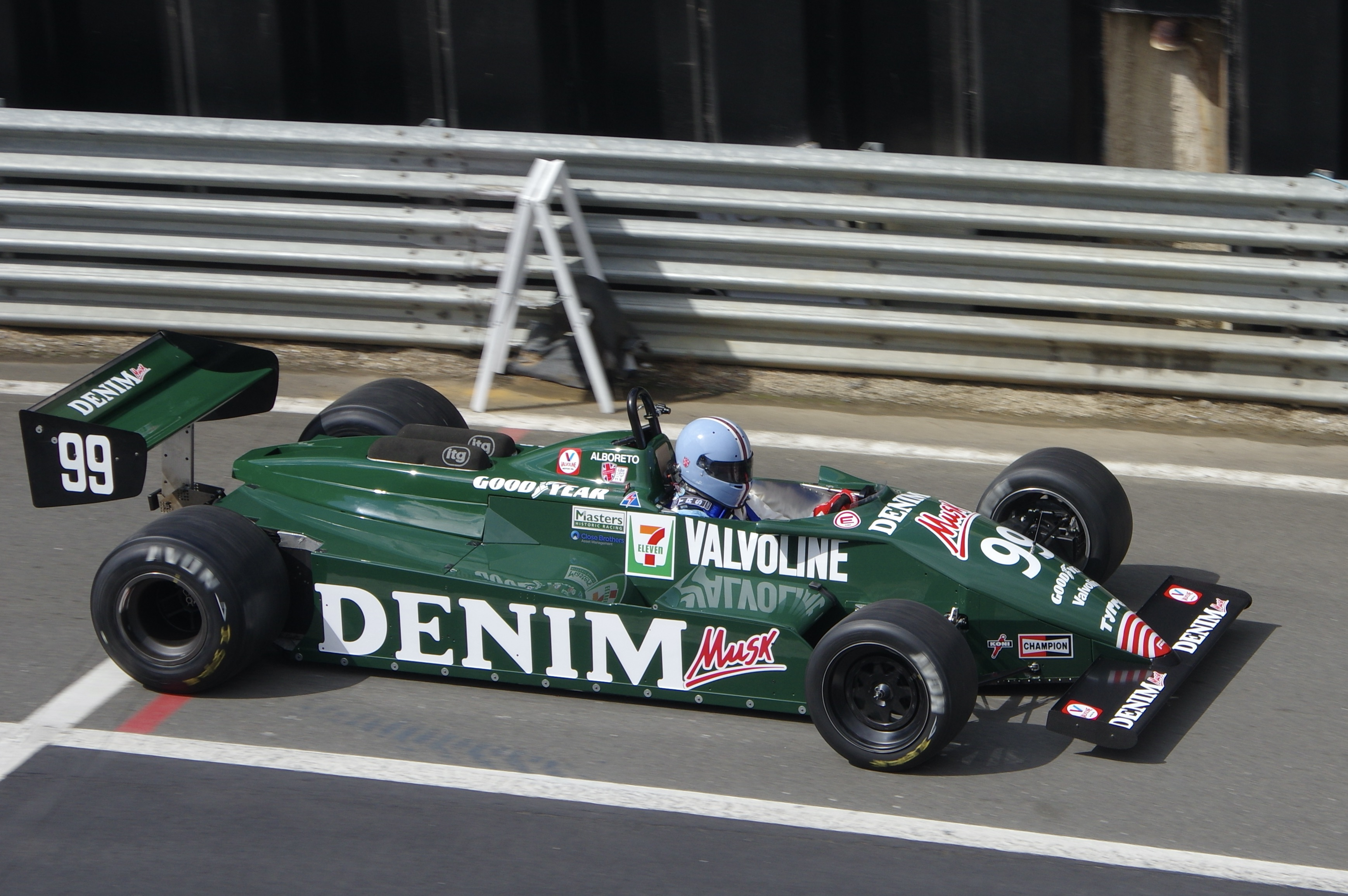
A 1982 Tyrrell 011 pictured in 2022

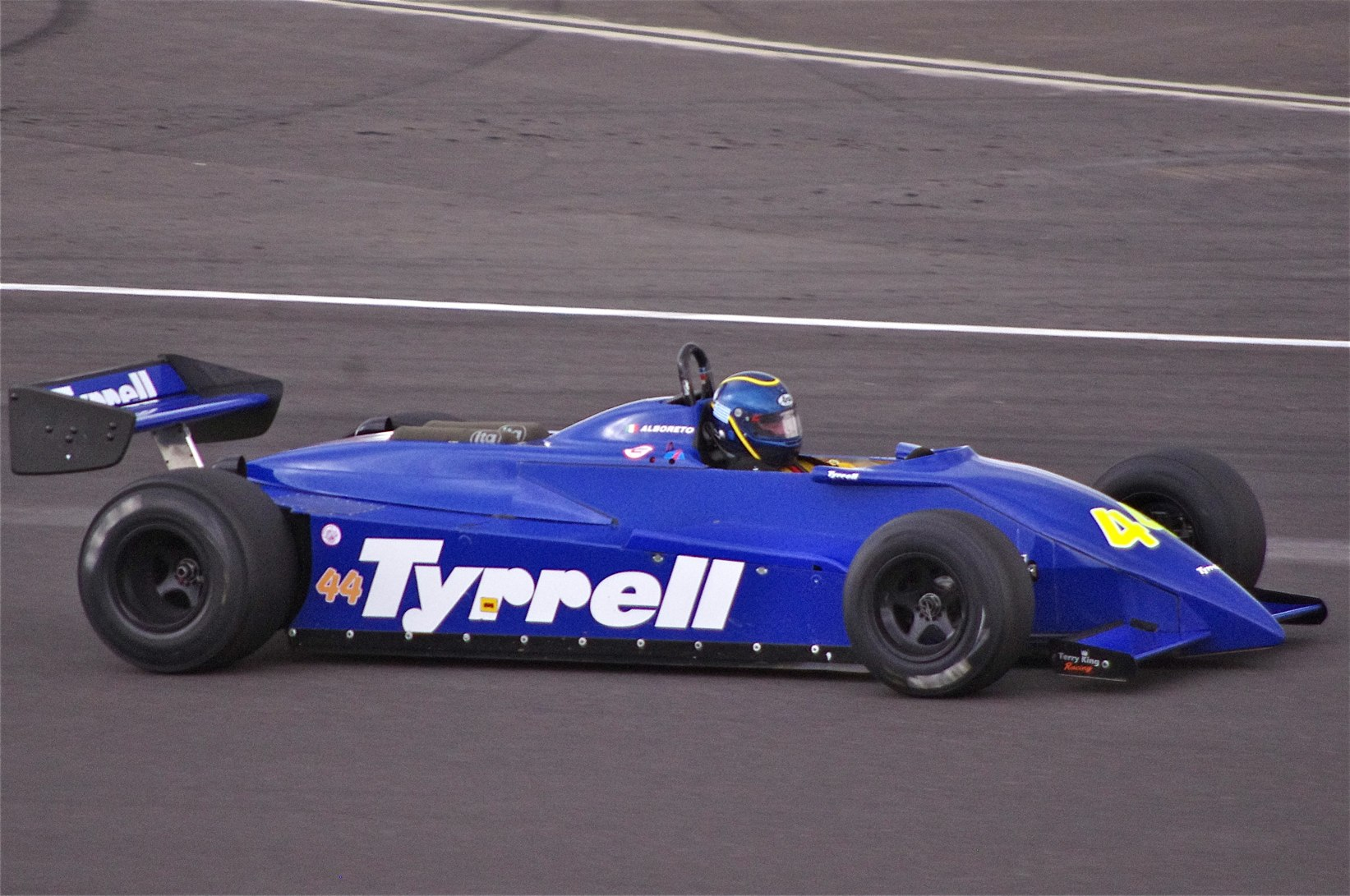
A 1982 Tyrrell 011 pictured in 2011

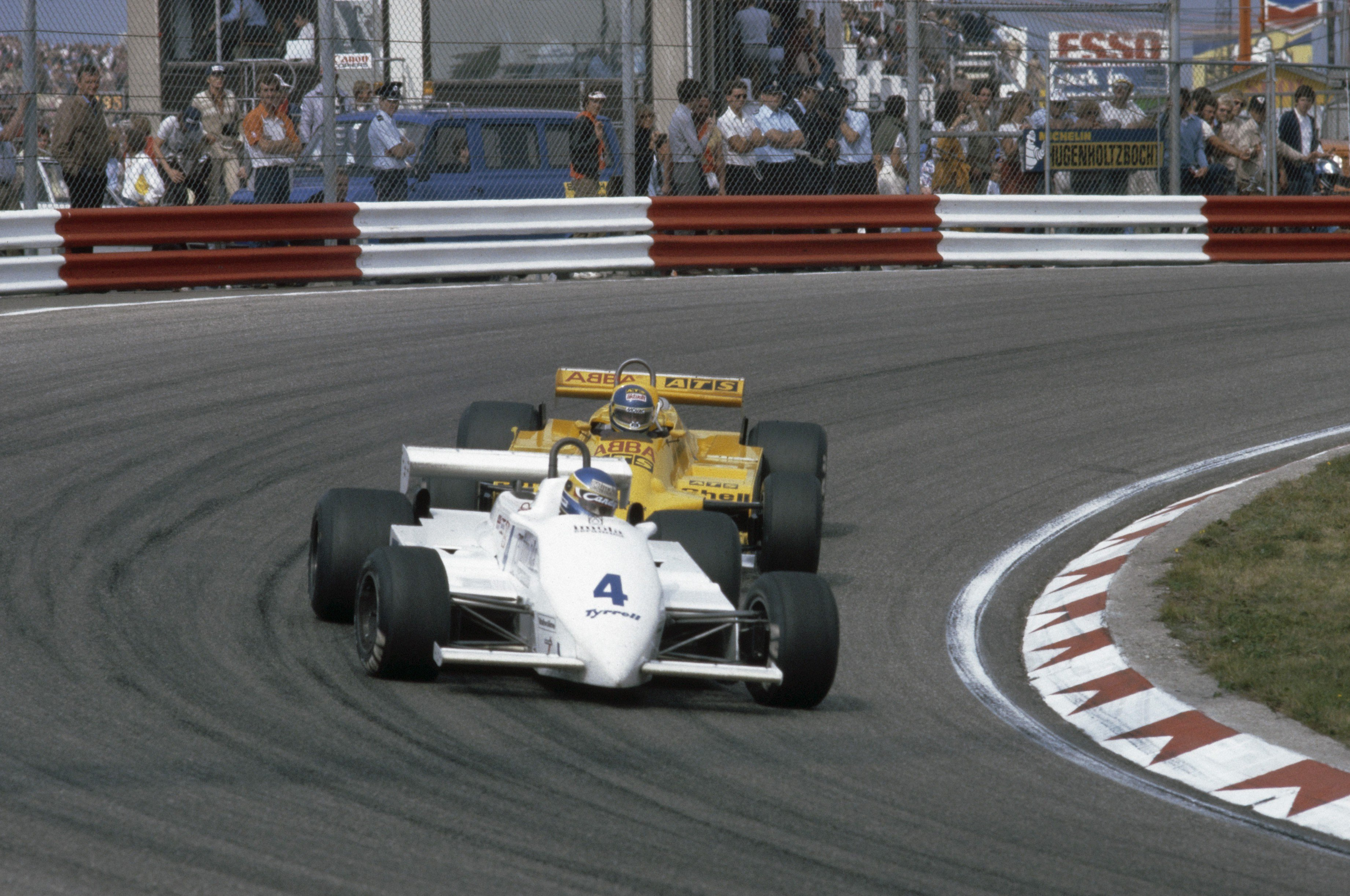
Michele Alboreto at the 1981 Dutch Grand Prix

== Complete Formula One World Championship results ==
(key) (results in italics indicate fastest lap)

Year	Entrant	Engine	Tyres	Drivers	1	2	3	4	5	6	7	8	9	10	11	12	13	14	15	16	Pts	WCC
1981	Tyrrell Racing Team	Cosworth DFV; V8 NA	A G		USW	BRA	ARG	SMR	BEL	MON	ESP	FRA	GBR	GER	AUT	NED	ITA	CAN	CPL		10*	10th
1981	Tyrrell Racing Team	Cosworth DFV; V8 NA	A G	Eddie Cheever										5	DNQ	Ret	Ret	12	Ret		10*	10th
1981	Tyrrell Racing Team	Cosworth DFV; V8 NA	A G	Michele Alboreto												9	Ret	11	13		10*	10th
1982	Tyrrell Racing Team	Cosworth DFV; V8 NA	G		RSA	BRA	USW	SMR	BEL	MON	DET	CAN	NED	GBR	FRA	GER	AUT	SUI	ITA	CPL	25	6th
1982	Tyrrell Racing Team	Cosworth DFV; V8 NA	G	Michele Alboreto	7	4	4	3	Ret	10	Ret	Ret	7	Ret	6	4	Ret	7	5	1	25	6th
1982	Tyrrell Racing Team	Cosworth DFV; V8 NA	G	Brian Henton				Ret	Ret	8	9	NC	Ret	8	10	7	Ret	11	Ret	8	25	6th
1982	Tyrrell Racing Team	Cosworth DFV; V8 NA	G	Slim Borgudd	16	7	10														25	6th
1983	Benetton Team Tyrrell	Cosworth DFV; V8 NA	G		BRA	USW	FRA	SMR	MON	BEL	DET	CAN	GBR	GER	AUT	NED	ITA	EUR	RSA		12*	7th
1983	Benetton Team Tyrrell	Cosworth DFV; V8 NA	G	Michele Alboreto	Ret	9	8	Ret	Ret	14	1	8	13	Ret							12*	7th
1983	Benetton Team Tyrrell	Cosworth DFV; V8 NA	G	Danny Sullivan	11	8	Ret	Ret	5	12	Ret	DSQ	14	12	Ret	Ret	Ret				12*	7th

* 6 points scored in 1981 using the Tyrrell 010
* 1 point scored in 1983 using the Tyrrell 012
