= Tyrrell 012 =

Formula One racing car

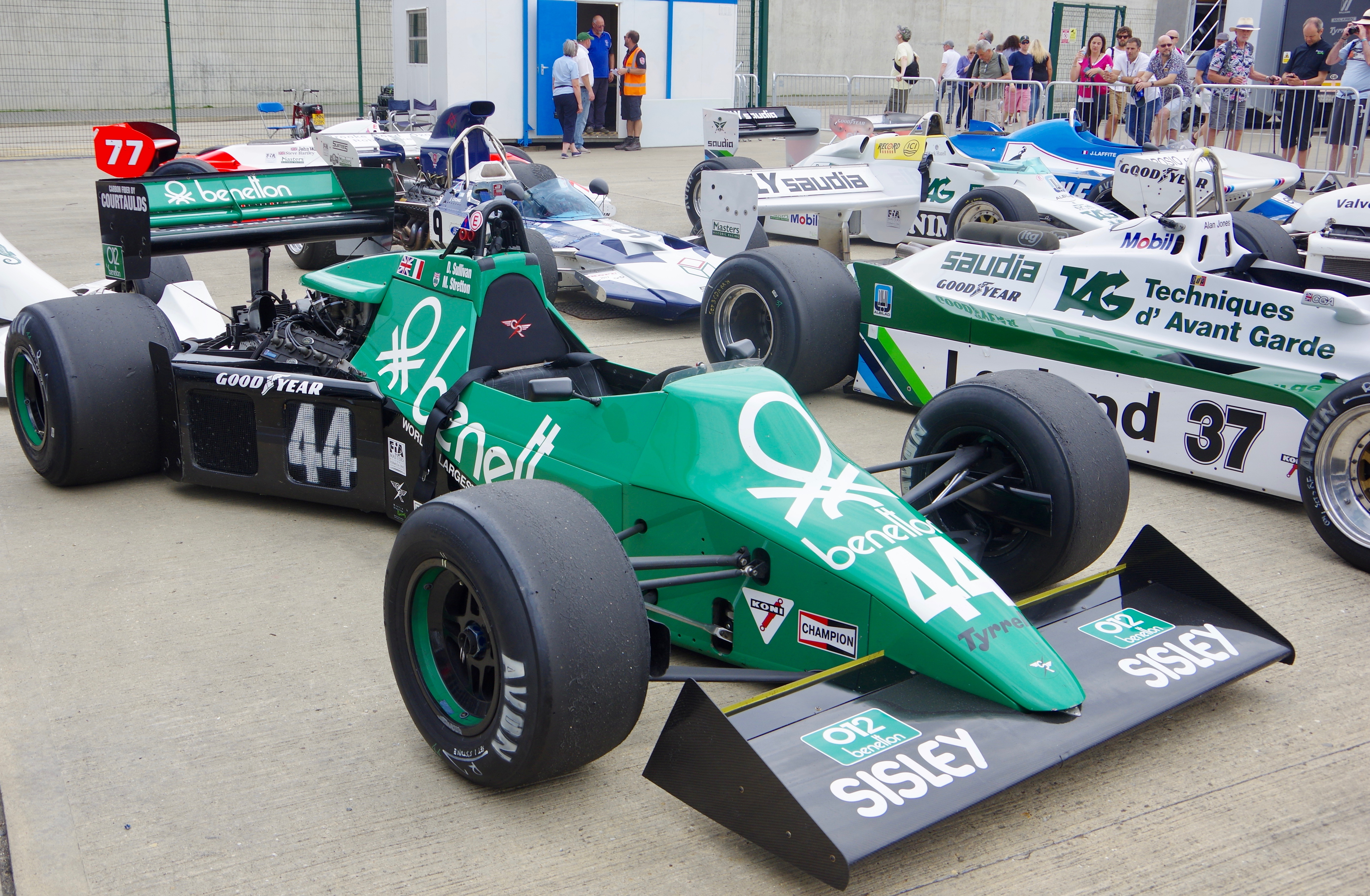
- The 012 on display in 2019
- Category: Formula One
- Constructor: Tyrrell Racing Organisation
- Designers: Maurice Philippe (Technical Director); Brian Lisles (Chief Designer)
- Predecessor: 011
- Successor: 014

Technical specifications
- Chassis: Alloy monocoque with carbon fiber reinforcements
- Suspension (front): Double wishbone, pullrod operated coil springs
- Suspension (rear): Double wishbone, coil springs
- Axle track: Front: 1,727 mm (68.0 in); Rear: 1,473 mm (58.0 in)
- Wheelbase: 2,642 mm (104.0 in)
- Engine: Cosworth DFY, 2,993 cc (182.6 cu in), 90° V8, NA, mid-engine, longitudinally mounted
- Transmission: Hewland FGA 400 5-speed manual
- Weight: 540 kg (1,190 lb)
- Fuel: Elf
- Tyres: Goodyear

Competition history
- Notable entrants: Benetton Tyrrell Racing Team (1983); Tyrrell Racing Organisation
- Notable drivers: (Italy) Michele Alboreto (United States) Danny Sullivan (United Kingdom) Martin Brundle (Sweden) Stefan Johansson (Germany) Stefan Bellof (New Zealand) Mike Thackwell
- Debut: 1983 Austrian Grand Prix
- Last event: 1985 Austrian Grand Prix
Races	Wins	Poles	F/Laps
29	0	0	0

The Tyrrell 012 is a Formula One racing car that was designed by Maurice Philippe for the Tyrrell team. It was introduced for the 1983 season, and was subsequently used in 1984 and the first few races of 1985.

== Overview ==
=== 1983 ===
It was the first chassis built by the team to be composed mostly of carbon fibre, following on from Lotus and McLaren. The car was powered by the short-stroke version of the Ford Cosworth DFV that had previously been supplied to Lotus, after that team signed to use Renault turbo engines. The Benetton clothing company sponsored the team in 1983, with the large budget used to successfully develop the car. Although the car was light and nimble, it was no match for the massively powerful turbo cars.

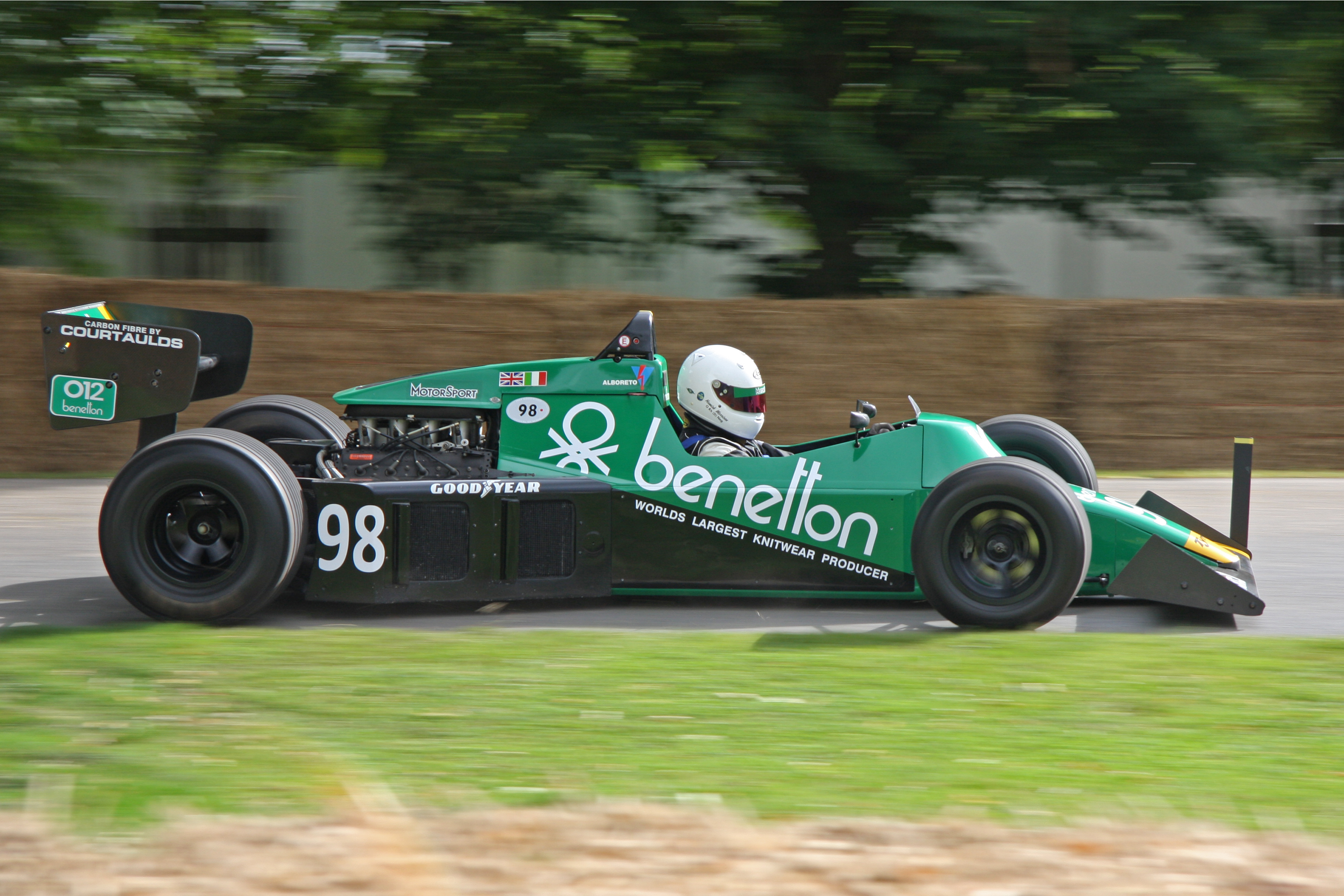
A 1983-liveried 012 being demonstrated at the 2008 Goodwood Festival of Speed.

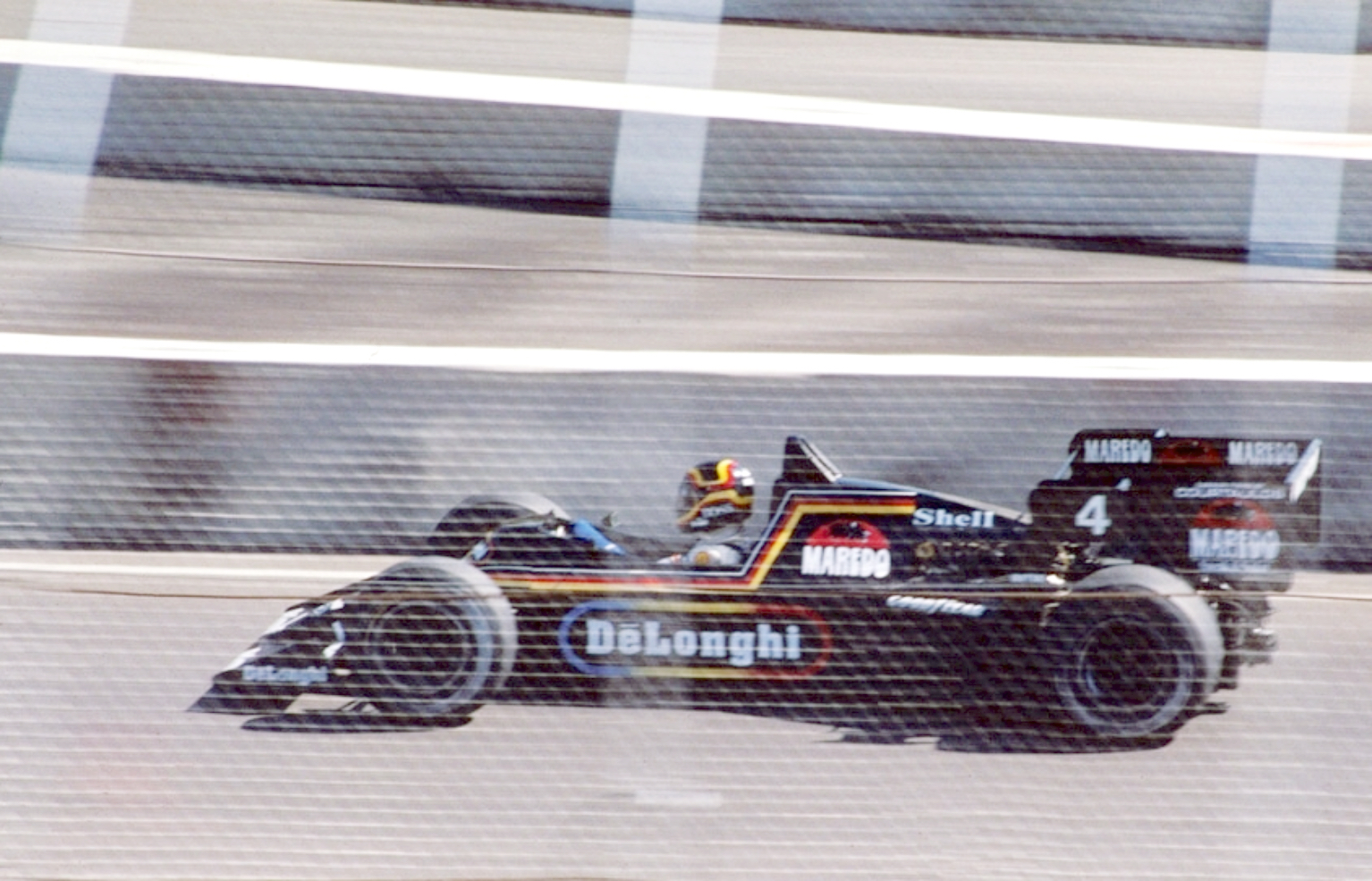
Stefan Bellof in a Tyrrell 012 at the 1984 Dallas Grand Prix.

Ken Tyrrell continued to use young, promising drivers in his team and helped develop their careers. Michele Alboreto, in his second year for the team, scored a point in the car's first race at Zandvoort.

==== Boomerang car ====
The initial version of Tyrrell 012 had a triangle-shaped rear-wing design (and was nicknamed "boomerang"). The car with this wing design was seen only once during a grand prix weekend, in the hands of Michele Alboreto during practice for the 1983 Austrian Grand Prix. The same car design also appeared during F1 tyre testing at Brands Hatch in 1983.

=== 1984 ===
For 1984, the sponsor was Systime Computers Ltd, a Leeds-based company that manufactured minicomputers. Alboreto moved on to Ferrari and was replaced by Martin Brundle, whilst Stefan Bellof filled the other seat. The 012 was further developed with smaller sidepods and a larger rear wing to increase downforce. A newer version of the DFV, dubbed the DFY was provided to the team by Ford. Tyrrell were now the only one of the established teams to use the venerable engine. Both Brundle and Bellof impressed in their rookie seasons in F1, achieving solid placings and a podium place each, but after Brundle's second place in the Detroit Grand Prix the cars were disqualified by the FIA for various rule infringements and the team were excluded from the championship.

=== 1985 ===
The 012 was pressed into service in the early races of 1985 and Bellof pulled off a run of points finishes until the 014 Renault turbo was introduced; its chassis almost identical to its predecessor's. The DFY engine, by the start of the 1985 season was around 300 hp down on most of the turbo-charged engines used by other teams that year. The 012 does, however, have the distinction of being the last Formula 1 car to enter a race powered by the DFV's development, the Cosworth DFY engine, with Martin Brundle driving in the 1985 Austrian Grand Prix. Brundle failed to qualify for the race.

By 1985 the 012 was the only car in Formula One still using a non-turbo engine which put the team at a severe power disadvantage. This was shown on the 1.8 km long Mistral Straight at Paul Ricard for the French Grand Prix. Brundle had been given use of the 012's replacement, the 014 which used a turbocharged Renault engine. He qualified 20th some 4.4 seconds faster than Bellof in the Cosworth powered 012 (Bellof was predictably 26th and last). Brundle said after qualifying that at one point while both were on a quick lap, he had followed Bellof's 012 onto the Mistral about 100 yards back, and by the time he reached Signes, Bellof was nothing more than a dot in his mirrors. The top speed of the new turbo powered car was around 310 km/h (193 mph), some 33 km/h (21 mph) faster than the older 012.

In 1985, two examples of this car were also used in Formula 3000 by Barron Racing Team.

== Complete Formula One results ==
(key)

Year	Team	Engine	Tyres	Driver	No.	1	2	3	4	5	6	7	8	9	10	11	12	13	14	15	16	Pts.	WCC
1983	Benetton Tyrrell Racing Team	Cosworth DFY; V8 NA	G			BRA	USW	FRA	SMR	MON	BEL	DET	CAN	GBR	GER	AUT	NED	ITA	EUR	RSA		12*	7th
1983	Benetton Tyrrell Racing Team	Cosworth DFY; V8 NA	G	Michele Alboreto	3											Ret	6	Ret	Ret	Ret		12*	7th
1983	Benetton Tyrrell Racing Team	Cosworth DFY; V8 NA	G	Danny Sullivan	4														Ret	7		12*	7th
1984	Tyrrell Racing Organisation	Cosworth DFY; V8 NA	G			BRA	RSA	BEL	SMR	FRA	MON	CAN	DET	DAL	GBR	GER	AUT	NED	ITA	EUR	POR	0**	EX
1984	Tyrrell Racing Organisation	Cosworth DFY; V8 NA	G	Martin Brundle	3	DSQ	DSQ	DSQ	DSQ	DSQ	DNQ	DSQ	DSQ	DNQ								0**	EX
1984	Tyrrell Racing Organisation	Cosworth DFY; V8 NA	G	Stefan Johansson	3										DSQ	DSQ	DNQ	DSQ	EX	EX	EX	0**	EX
1984	Tyrrell Racing Organisation	Cosworth DFY; V8 NA	G	Stefan Bellof	4	DSQ	DSQ	DSQ	DSQ	DSQ	DSQ	DSQ	DSQ	DSQ	DSQ		EX	DSQ	EX	EX	EX	0**	EX
1984	Tyrrell Racing Organisation	Cosworth DFY; V8 NA	G	Mike Thackwell	4											DNQ						0**	EX
1985	Tyrrell Racing Organisation	Cosworth DFY; V8 NA	G			BRA	POR	SMR	MON	CAN	DET	FRA	GBR	GER	AUT	NED	ITA	BEL	EUR	RSA	AUS	4	9th
1985	Tyrrell Racing Organisation	Cosworth DFY; V8 NA	G	Martin Brundle	3	8	Ret	9	10	12	Ret											4	9th
1985	Tyrrell Racing Organisation	Cosworth DFY; V8 NA	G	Martin Brundle	4									10	DNQ							4	9th
1985	Tyrrell Racing Organisation	Cosworth DFY; V8 NA	G	Stefan Bellof	4		6	Ret	DNQ	11	4	13	11									4	9th
1985	Tyrrell Racing Organisation	Cosworth DFY; V8 NA	G	Stefan Johansson	4	7																4	9th

* 11 points scored using Tyrrell 011 in 1983
** Tyrrell Racing disqualified for entire 1984 season
