= Tyrrell 010 =

Formula One racing car

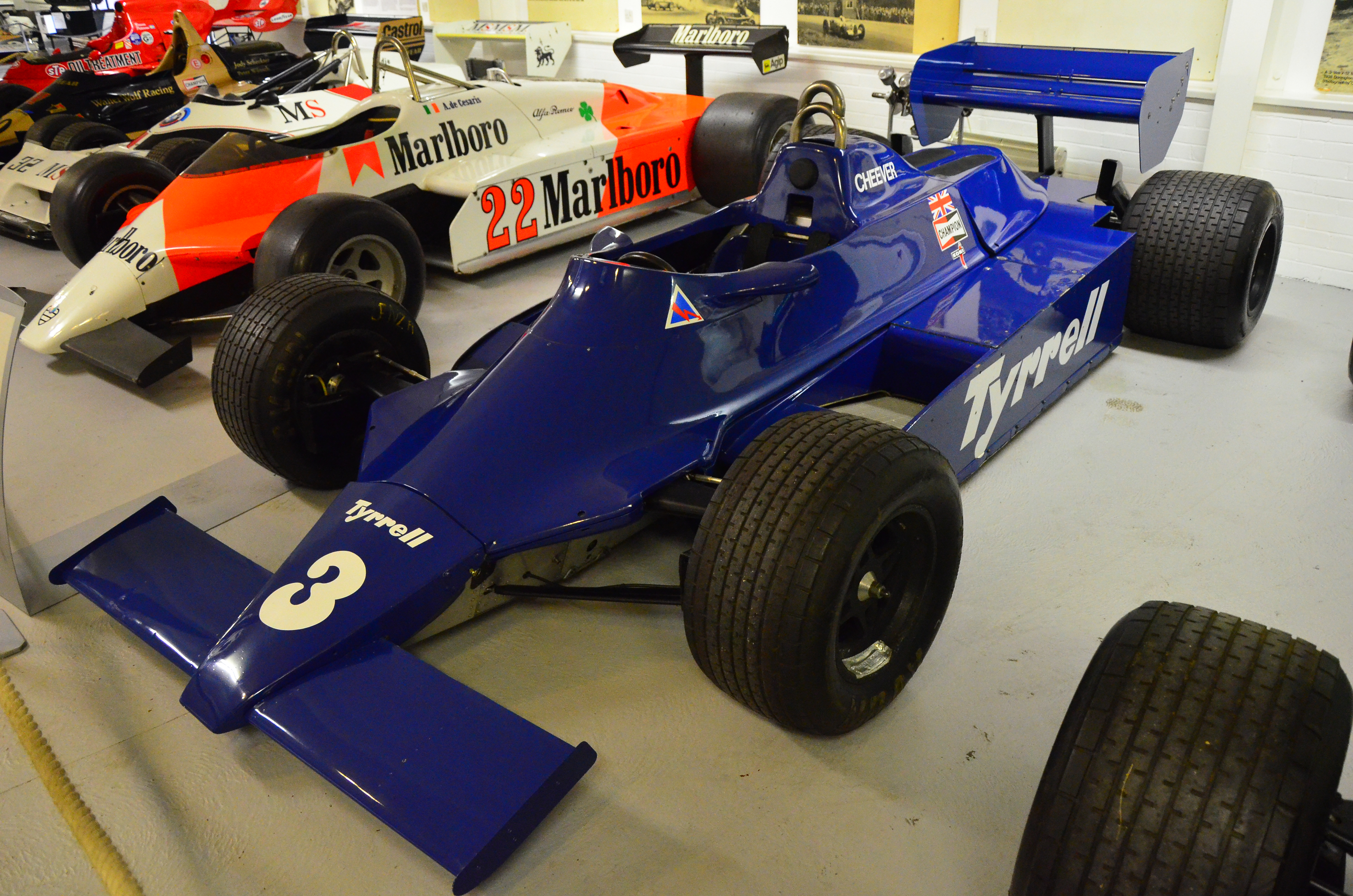
- Category: Formula One
- Constructor: Tyrrell Racing Organisation
- Designer: Maurice Philippe
- Predecessor: 009
- Successor: 011

Technical specifications
- Chassis: Carbon fibre monocoque
- Suspension (front): Double wishbone with pullrod operated coil springs
- Suspension (rear): Double wishbone with pullrod operated coil springs
- Engine: Ford-Cosworth DFV, 2,993 cc (182.6 cu in), 90° V8, NA, mid-engine, longitudinally mounted
- Transmission: Hewland FG 400 6-speed manual
- Fuel: 1980: Elf; 1981: Valvoline
- Tyres: 1980: Goodyear; 1981: Michelin; 1981: Avon

Competition history
- Notable entrants: Candy Team Tyrrell (1980); Tyrrell Racing Team (1981)
- Notable drivers: (Republic of Ireland) Derek Daly (France) Jean-Pierre Jarier (United States) Eddie Cheever (Italy) Michele Alboreto (Argentina) Ricardo Zunino
- Debut: 1980 South African Grand Prix
- Last event: 1981 Austrian Grand Prix
Races	Wins	Poles	F/Laps
23	0	0	0
- Constructors' Championships: 0
- Drivers' Championships: 0
- Unless otherwise stated, all data refer to Formula One World Championship Grands Prix only.

The Tyrrell 010 was a Formula One racing car that was designed by Maurice Philippe for Tyrrell Racing for the 1980 season.

The 010, like all Tyrrells before it was powered by the Ford-Cosworth DFV V8 engine and made its competition debut in the third race of the season in South Africa. The 010s were driven by Frenchman Jean-Pierre Jarier and Irishman Derek Daly, with New Zealander Mike Thackwell driving a third car at the last two races of the season.

The team continued using the 010 in 1981. Americans Eddie Cheever and Kevin Cogan drove in the season-opening U.S. West Grand Prix, but Cogan was replaced for the next two races by Argentinian Ricardo Zunino, who himself was replaced from Round 4 at Imola by Italian Michele Alboreto. Alboreto who was making his F1 debut and the first of an eventual 194 starts from 215 attempts in Formula One in a career which would see 5 wins, 2 pole positions, 23 podium finishes and runner up in the 1985 World Drivers' Championship while driving for Ferrari.

The 010 was replaced in the middle of the 1981 season by the new 011. The last race for the 010 was the 1981 Austrian Grand Prix where Alboreto qualified 22nd and retired after 40 laps with gearbox failure. The best placings for the 010 were two 4th places: one for Daly in the 1980 British Grand Prix, and another for Cheever at the 1981 British Grand Prix, his last race in the 010 before switching to the 011 in Germany. Tyrrell scored 9 of their 12 points in 1980 and 8 of their 10 points in 1981 with the 010. This car would be the first Tyrrell since the 004 (which was only raced three times by the main team in 1972 and twice more by South African Eddie Keizan in a non-works effort for the 1973 and 1974 South African Grand Prix races) which failed to get a single podium finish and since neither the 009 at the beginning of 1980 (after having obtained a few third-place finishes during 1979) nor the 011 at the end of 1981 (which would go on to get a victory with Michele Alboreto in the 1982 Caesers Palace Grand Prix at Las Vegas) allowed Tyrrell a top-three finish during the seasons in question, 1980 and 1981 would be the first and second full seasons from a Tyrrell-built Tyrrell entry without a podium (Tyrrell cars were podiumless in 1970 but were only raced in the last three events while Jackie Stewart won earlier in that season in a Tyrrell-entered March at Jarama, Spain).

== Complete Formula One World Championship results ==
(key) (results in italics indicate fastest lap, results in bold indicate pole position)

Year	Entrant	Engine	Tyres	Drivers	1	2	3	4	5	6	7	8	9	10	11	12	13	14	15	Pts	WCC
1980	Candy Team Tyrrell	Cosworth DFV; V8 NA	**G**		ARG	BRA	RSA	USW	BEL	MON	FRA	GBR	GER	AUT	NED	ITA	CAN	USA		**12***	6th
1980	Candy Team Tyrrell	Cosworth DFV; V8 NA	**G**	Jean-Pierre Jarier			7	Ret	5	Ret	14	5	15	Ret	5	13	7	NC		**12***	6th
1980	Candy Team Tyrrell	Cosworth DFV; V8 NA	**G**	Derek Daly				8	9	Ret	11	4	10	Ret	Ret	Ret	Ret	Ret		**12***	6th
1980	Candy Team Tyrrell	Cosworth DFV; V8 NA	**G**	Mike Thackwell													Ret	DNQ		**12***	6th
1981	Tyrrell Racing Team	Cosworth DFV; V8 NA	**MI**; **A**		USW	BRA	ARG	SMR	BEL	MON	ESP	FRA	GBR	GER	AUT	NED	ITA	CAN	CPL	10**	10th
1981	Tyrrell Racing Team	Cosworth DFV; V8 NA	**MI**; **A**	Eddie Cheever	5	NC	Ret	Ret	6	5	NC	13	4							10**	10th
1981	Tyrrell Racing Team	Cosworth DFV; V8 NA	**MI**; **A**	Kevin Cogan	DNQ															10**	10th
1981	Tyrrell Racing Team	Cosworth DFV; V8 NA	**MI**; **A**	Ricardo Zunino		13	13													10**	10th
1981	Tyrrell Racing Team	Cosworth DFV; V8 NA	**MI**; **A**	Michele Alboreto				Ret	12	Ret	DNQ	16	Ret	DNQ	Ret					10**	10th

* 3 points scored in 1980 using the Tyrrell 009
** 2 points scored in 1981 using the Tyrrell 011
