= Jean-Pierre Jarier =

French racing driver (born 1946)

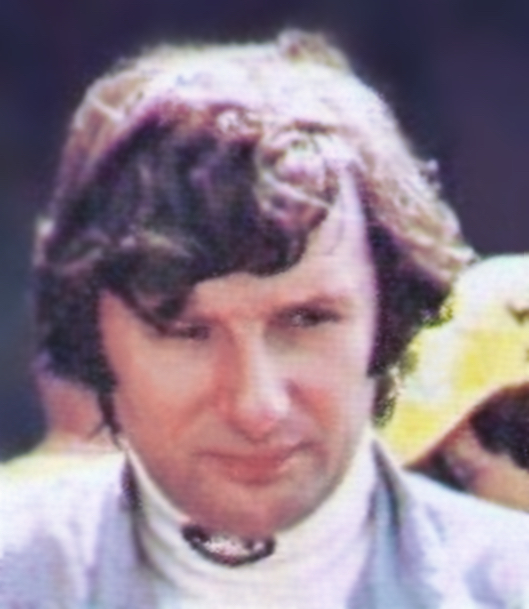
- Jarier in 1976
- Born: Jean-Pierre Jacques Jarier; 10 July 1946 (age 80); Charenton-le-Pont, Paris, France

Formula One World Championship career
- Nationality: (France) French
- Active years: 1971, 1973–1983
- Team(s): Privateer March, March, Shadow, ATS, Ligier, Lotus, Tyrrell, Osella
- Entries: 143 (134 starts)
- Championships: 0
- Wins: 0
- Podiums: 3
- Career points: 31.5
- Pole positions: 3
- Fastest laps: 3
- First entry: 1971 Italian Grand Prix
- Last entry: 1983 South African Grand Prix

24 Hours of Le Mans career
- Years: 1972, 1974–1975, 1977–1979, 1981, 1984–1985, 1988, 1995–1999
- Teams: NART, Gitanes, Ligier, Mirage, Renault, Porsche, BASF, Kremer, Schuppan, Larbre, Roock, Chéreau
- Best finish: 2nd (1977)
- Class wins: 0

Jean-Pierre Jacques Jarier (French pronunciation: [ʒɑ̃pjɛʁ ʒaʁje]; born 10 July 1946) is a French former racing driver, who competed in Formula One from 1971 to 1983.

Jarier contested 143 Formula One Grands Prix for March, Shadow, ATS, Ligier, Lotus, Tyrrell, and Osella. He achieved three podiums and three pole positions across 12 seasons.

== Early career ==
Jean-Pierre Jacques Jarier was born on 10 July 1946 in Charenton-le-Pont, near Paris. After competing in Formula France, he moved up to French Formula Three, finishing 3rd overall in 1970, before moving on to the Shell Arnold European Formula Two team in 1971. He peaked with two 3rd places, and also made his Grand Prix debut at Monza when the team rented a March Engineering 701. However, the team dropped him midway through 1972 for financial reasons. For 1973 he signed to the March Engineering Formula Two team, and was also given a Formula One seat by the outfit. Formula One was difficult in the uncompetitive 721G, but Jarier stormed to the Formula Two title with eight wins.

== Formula One ==
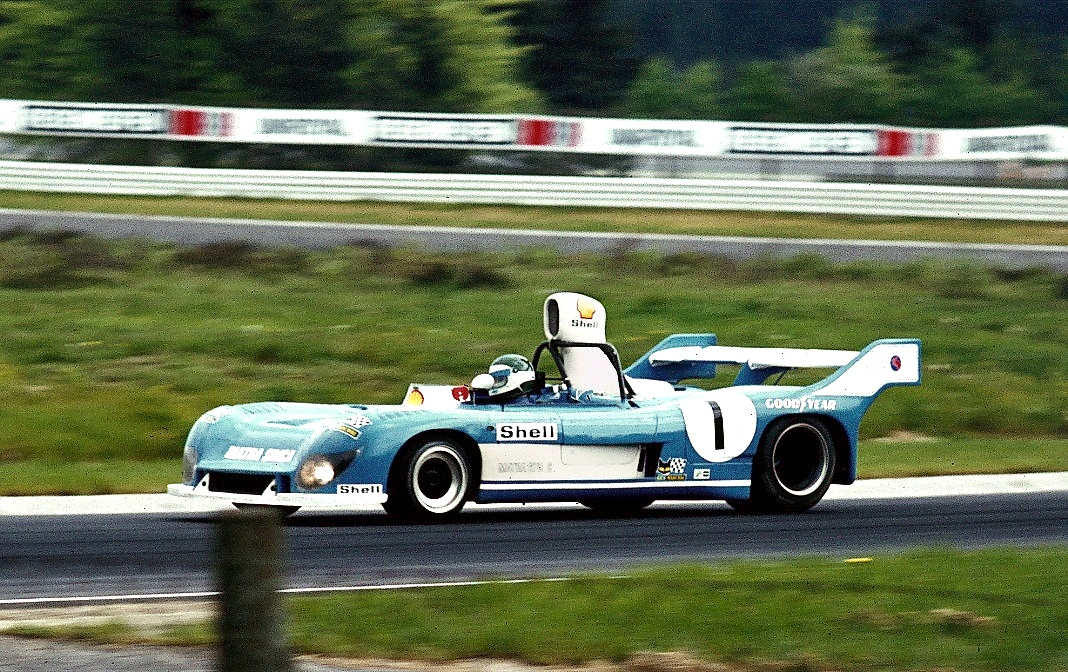
Jarier won the 1000 km Nürburgring race in 1974 with Jean-Pierre Beltoise. The pair drove a Matra-Simca 670C.

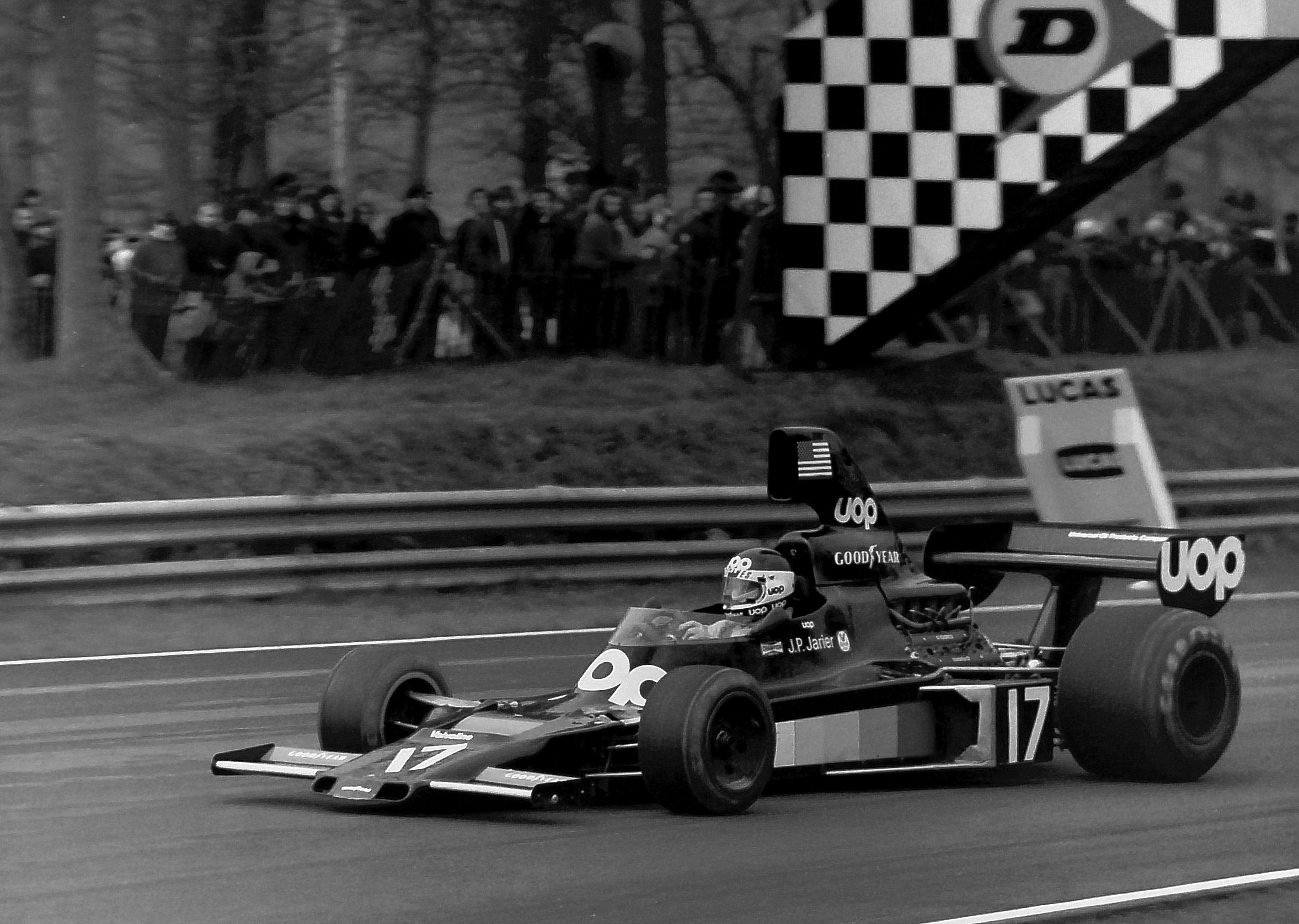
Jarier at the 1975 Race of Champions

After his good form in the 1973 F2 European series, Jarier nearly signed for Ferrari, but their established driver Clay Regazzoni insisted on having the young Austrian Niki Lauda as his teammate. In 1974, Jarier drove a full season of Formula One, signing with the Shadow Racing Cars team. He became team leader following the death of Peter Revson, and finished 3rd at the Monaco Grand Prix on his way to 14th overall. As a sports car driver. Jarier led Matra's successful defense of its world sports car title, and proved himself the fastest driver of all on the classic road circuits, being faster than Ickx at Nürburgring and the old Spa road circuit and winning three other rounds on GP circuits at Brands Hatch, Watkins Glen and Paul Ricard.

1975 began Jarier putting his Shadow DN5 on pole position for the Argentine Grand Prix, only for a component to break in the warm-up, preventing Jarier from taking the start. He repeated the feat at the Brazilian Grand Prix, and then dominated the race until a fuel metering unit failed, ending his race. Bad luck and poor reliability would curse his season, though the Shadow team fell from the pace as well. His only points-scoring finish was for fourth place in the shortened Spanish Grand Prix.

Jarier spent 1976 with Shadow Racing Cars, qualifying third in an updated version of the previous year's car, the DN5B and setting fastest lap at the opening Brazilian Grand Prix, before spinning off and crashing on James Hunt's oil whilst running second a few seconds behind Niki Lauda in a Ferrari. Subsequently, the car became uncompetitive, and Jarier failed to score any points.

After this, Jarier's career slowed. He switched to the ATS team in 1977, driving a Penske. He scored a point in his first race for the team, and then had one-off drives for Shadow and Équipe Ligier when the German team elected to miss the final races of the year. He also dabbled in sports cars, winning two races in an Alfa Romeo T33 with Arturo Merzario, and coming second at the Le Mans 24 Hours with Vern Schuppan in a Mirage.

Jarier's second year at ATS in the in-house HS1, was less successful, and he was fired after an argument with team principal Günter Schmid after failing to qualify the car for the Monaco Grand Prix. He was briefly re-hired for the German Grand Prix, only to miss the grid again, and again argued with Schmid, leaving once more. However, at the end of the year he was signed by Team Lotus to take the seat left by Ronnie Peterson's death. He set fastest lap at the United States Grand Prix East at Watkins Glen, running third before he ran out of fuel, and then took pole and dominated at the Canadian Grand Prix at Montreal before an oil leak ended his race.

These showings saw him signed by Tyrrell Racing. He was a regular points-scorer over two seasons with the team, with his best results being two third places, achieved at the 1979 South African Grand Prix and the 1979 British Grand Prix.

Jarier began 1981 with a temporary assignment for Ligier, standing in while Jean-Pierre Jabouille returned to fitness, for two races at Long Beach and Rio de Janeiro. He then drove with Osella beginning midway through the season.

1982 saw a full season with Osella, with Jarier securing the team's best-ever finish with fourth at the San Marino Grand Prix (which was boycotted by the majority of British teams). While the rest of the year would be difficult, Jarier was instrumental in keeping the team's morale up following the death of Riccardo Paletti at the Canadian Grand Prix.

The following year saw a full season with Equipe Ligier, but after a good run at Long Beach ended with a collision with Keke Rosberg, he finished the season without points, and spent most of the season making other drivers angry because of his blocking tactics as a back marker. One example of this was the Austrian Grand Prix that year. On lap 22, Ferrari driver Patrick Tambay, who had led the race from the start, was held up by Jarier for two corners (the Glatsch-kurve and the Bosch-kurve). As he was being held up, Tambay's team-mate René Arnoux was able to pass Tambay on the approach to the Texaco-Schikane by boxing Tambay in behind Jarier. This also allowed Brabham driver Nelson Piquet to come from third to second by nipping past Tambay into the second of the two left-handers, which dropped Tambay to third and denied him the lead he had been preparing to re-take from Arnoux. A furious Tambay waved his fist at Jarier when he finally did pass him.

== Later life ==
Following this, Jarier retired from motorsport, but was tempted back to drive in the Porsche Supercup in 1994. This led to several sports car drives, winning the 1998 and 1999 French GT Championships. Jarier contributed major stunt work to the film Ronin, directed by John Frankenheimer, who also directed the 1966 Grand Prix.

== Racing record ==
=== Career summary ===
Season	Series	Team	Races	Wins	Poles	F/Laps	Podiums	Points	Position
1970	French Formula Three	Ecurie Meubles Arnold	?	1	?	?	?	32.2	**3rd**
1971	European Formula Two	Shell-Arnold Team	7	0	0	0	2	10	8th
1971	Formula One	Shell-Arnold Team	1	0	0	0	0	0	NC
1972	European Formula Two	Shell-Arnold Team	2	0	0	0	0	0	NC
1972	Can-Am	North American Racing Team	2	0	0	0	0	11	13th
1972	24 Hours of Le Mans	North American Racing Team	1	0	0	0	0	N/A	9th
1973	European Formula Two	STP March Racing Team	12	7	4	4	9	78	**1st**
1973	Formula One	STP March Racing Team	8	0	0	0	0	0	NC
1973	Formula One	March Racing Team	2	0	0	0	0	0	NC
1974	Formula One	UOP Shadow Racing Team	14	0	0	0	1	6	14th
1974	24 Hours of Le Mans	Équipe Gitanes	1	0	0	1	0	N/A	DNF
1975	Formula One	UOP Shadow Racing Team	13	0	2	1	0	1.5	18th
1975	24 Hours of Le Mans	Gitanes Automobiles Ligier	1	0	0	0	0	N/A	DNF
1976	Formula One	Shadow Racing Team Lucky Strike Shadow Racing Tabatip Shadow Racing	16	0	0	1	0	0	NC
1976	European Formula Two	Fred Opert Racing	2	0	0	0	0	0	NC‡
1977	Formula One	ATS Racing Team	10	0	0	0	0	1	19th
1977	Formula One	Ambrosio Tabatip Shadow Racing	1	0	0	0	0	1	19th
1977	Formula One	Ligier Gitanes	1	0	0	0	0	1	19th
1977	24 Hours of Le Mans	Grand Touring Cars Inc.	1	0	0	0	1	N/A	**2nd**
1978	Can-Am	Shadow Racing Team	8	0	0	0	0	15.5	28th
1978	European Formula Two	Maublanc Racing Services	4	0	0	0	1	0	NC‡
1978	Formula One	ATS Racing Team	3	0	0	0	0	0	NC
1978	Formula One	John Player Team Lotus	2	0	1	1	0	0	NC
1978	24 Hours of Le Mans	Equipe Renault Elf Sport	1	0	0	0	0	N/A	DNF
1979	Formula One	Team Tyrrell Candy Tyrrell Team	12	0	0	0	2	14	11th
1979	BMW M1 Procar	BMW Motorsport	1	0	0	0	0	2	27th
1979	24 Hours of Le Mans	Jean-Pierre Jarier	1	0	0	0	0	N/A	DNF
1980	Formula One	Candy Tyrrell Team	14	0	0	0	0	6	13th
1980	BMW M1 Procar	BMW Motorsport	1	0	0	0	0	0	NC
1981	Formula One	Équipe Talbot Gitanes	2	0	0	0	0	0	NC
1981	Formula One	Denim Osella	7	0	0	0	0	0	NC
1981	Macau Grand Prix	Theodore Racing	1	0	0	0	0	0	NC
1981	24 Hours of Le Mans	BASF Cassetten Team GS Sport	1	0	0	0	0	0	NC
1982	Formula One	Denim S.A.I.M.A. Osella	13	0	0	0	0	3	20th
1983	Formula One	Équipe Ligier Gitanes	15	0	0	0	0	0	NC
1984	24 Hours of Le Mans	Porsche Kremer Racing	1	0	0	0	0	N/A	6th
1985	French Supertouring Championship		?	2	?	2	4	122	6th
1985	24 Hours of Le Mans	Porsche Kremer Racing	1	0	0	0	0	N/A	9th
1986	European Touring Car Championship	JMS Racing	3	0	0	0	0	10	NC
1987	European Touring Car Championship	Elkron France	1	0	0	0	0	0	NC
1988	24 Hours of Le Mans	Takefuji Schuppan Racing Team	1	0	0	0	0	N/A	10th
1993	Porsche Supercup	Roock Racing Team	?	1	0	0	1	59	10th
1994	Porsche Supercup		?	1	?	?	1	0	NC
1995	BPR Global GT Series	Larbre Compétition	7	0	0	0	4	124	8th
1995	24 Hours of Le Mans	Larbre Compétition	1	0	0	0	0	N/A	DNF
1996	BPR Global GT Series	Roock Racing Team	8	0	0	0	0	11	104th
1996	24 Hours of Le Mans	Roock Racing Team	1	0	0	0	0	N/A	DNF
1997	FFSA GT Championship	Sonauto Levallois	10	2	3	5	8	191	**3rd**
1997	FIA GT Championship	Roock Racing Team	1	0	1	0	0	0	NC
1997	24 Hours of Le Mans	Société Chéreau	1	0	0	0	0	N/A	DNF
1998	FFSA GT Championship	Sonauto Levallois	11	6	5	8	10	270.5	**1st**
1998	FIA GT Championship	Sonauto Levallois	1	0	0	0	1	4	31st
1998	24 Hours of Le Mans	Larbre Compétition	1	0	0	0	0	N/A	DNF
1999	FFSA GT Championship	Sonauto Levallois	12	3	3	4	9	337	**1st**
1999	FIA GT Championship	Larbre Compétition	2	0	0	0	0	0	NC
1999	24 Hours of Le Mans	Larbre Compétition	1	0	0	0	0	N/A	DNF
2000	FFSA GT Championship	Team ART	12	2	1	2	8	335	**2nd**
2000	FIA GT Championship	Team ART	3	0	0	0	0	2	32nd
2001	FIA GT Championship	Team ART	10	0	0	0	0	2	36th
2002	FIA GT Championship	Team ART	7	0	0	0	0	0	NC
2003	FFSA GT Championship	Red Racing	7	0	0	0	2	54	27th

^{‡} Graded drivers not eligible for European Formula Two Championship points.

=== Complete European Formula Two Championship results ===
(key) (Races in bold indicate pole position; races in italics indicate fastest lap)

Year	Entrant	Chassis	Engine	1	2	3	4	5	6	7	8	9	10	11	12	13	14	15	16	17	Pos.	Pts
1971	Shell-Arnold Team	March 712M	Ford	HOC	THR; Ret	NÜR	JAR; Ret	PAL; Ret	ROU; DNS	MAN; Ret	TUL	ALB; 3	VLL; DNQ	VLL; 3							8th	10
1972	Shell-Arnold Team	March 722	Ford	MAL	THR; Ret	HOC; Ret	PAU	PAL	HOC	ROU	ÖST	IMO	MAN	PER	SAL	ALB	HOC				NC	0
1973	STP March Racing Team	March 732	BMW	MAL; 1	HOC; 1	THR; Ret	NÜR; Ret	PAU; 2	KIN	**NIV**; 1	HOC	**ROU**; 1	MNZ	MAN; 1	KAR; 1	**PER**; 1	SAL	**NOR**; Ret	ALB; 2	VLL	1st	78
1976	Fred Opert Racing	Chevron B35	Hart	HOC	THR	VLL	SAL	PAU; 4	HOC	ROU	MUG	PER	EST	NOG; Ret	HOC						NC	0^{‡}
1978	Maublanc Racing Services	March 782	BMW	THR; Ret	HOC; 3	NÜR	PAU	MUG	VLL; Ret	ROU; 8	DON	NOG	PER	MIS	HOC						NC	0^{‡}

^{‡} Graded drivers not eligible for European Formula Two Championship points

=== Complete Formula One World Championship results ===
(key) (Races in bold indicate pole position, races in italics indicate fastest lap)

Year	Entrant	Chassis	Engine	1	2	3	4	5	6	7	8	9	10	11	12	13	14	15	16	17	WDC	Pts
1971	Shell Arnold Team	March 701	Ford Cosworth DFV 3.0 V8	RSA	ESP	MON	NED	FRA	GBR	GER	AUT	ITA; NC	CAN	USA							NC	0
1973	STP March Racing Team	March 721G	Ford Cosworth DFV 3.0 V8	ARG; Ret	BRA; Ret	RSA; NC	ESP														NC	0
1973	STP March Racing Team	March 731	Ford Cosworth DFV 3.0 V8					BEL; Ret	MON; Ret	SWE; Ret	FRA; Ret	GBR	NED	GER	AUT; Ret	ITA					NC	0
1973	March Racing Team	March 731	Ford Cosworth DFV 3.0 V8														CAN; NC	USA; 11			NC	0
1974	UOP Shadow Racing Team	Shadow DN1	Ford Cosworth DFV 3.0 V8	ARG; Ret	BRA; Ret	RSA															14th	6
1974	UOP Shadow Racing Team	Shadow DN3	Ford Cosworth DFV 3.0 V8				ESP; Ret	BEL; 13	MON; 3	SWE; 5	NED; Ret	FRA; 12	GBR; Ret	GER; 8	AUT; 8	ITA; Ret	CAN; Ret	USA; 10			14th	6
1975	UOP Shadow Racing Team	Shadow DN5	Ford Cosworth DFV 3.0 V8	**ARG**; DNS	**BRA**; Ret	RSA; Ret	ESP; 4	MON; Ret	BEL; Ret	SWE; Ret	NED; Ret	FRA; 8	GBR; 14	GER; Ret			USA; Ret				18th	1.5
1975	UOP Shadow Racing Team	Shadow DN7	Matra MS73 3.0 V12												AUT; Ret	ITA; Ret					18th	1.5
1976	Shadow Racing Team	Shadow DN5B	Ford Cosworth DFV 3.0 V8	BRA; Ret		USW; 7	ESP; Ret	BEL; 9	MON; 8	SWE; 12	FRA; 12	GBR; 9					CAN; 18	USA; 10	JPN; 10		NC	0
1976	Lucky Strike Shadow Racing	Shadow DN5B	Ford Cosworth DFV 3.0 V8		RSA; Ret																NC	0
1976	Tabatip Shadow Racing	Shadow DN5B	Ford Cosworth DFV 3.0 V8										GER; 11	AUT; Ret	NED; 10	ITA; 19					NC	0
1977	ATS Racing Team	Penske PC4	Ford Cosworth DFV 3.0 V8	ARG	BRA	RSA	USW; 6	ESP; DNQ	MON; 11	BEL; 11	SWE; 8	FRA; Ret	GBR; 9	GER; Ret	AUT; 14	NED; Ret	ITA; Ret				19th	1
1977	Ambrosio Tabatip Shadow Racing	Shadow DN8	Ford Cosworth DFV 3.0 V8															USA; 9	CAN		19th	1
1977	Ligier Gitanes	Ligier JS7	Matra MS76 3.0 V12																	JPN; Ret	19th	1
1978	ATS Racing Team	ATS HS1	Ford Cosworth DFV 3.0 V8	ARG; 12	BRA; DNS	RSA; 8	USW; 11	MON; DNQ	BEL	ESP	SWE	FRA	GBR	GER; DNQ	AUT	NED	ITA				NC	0
1978	John Player Team Lotus	Lotus 79	Ford Cosworth DFV 3.0 V8															USA; 15	**CAN**; Ret		NC	0
1979	Team Tyrrell	Tyrrell 009	Ford Cosworth DFV 3.0 V8	ARG; Ret	BRA; DNS	RSA; 3	USW; 6	ESP; 5													11th	14
1979	Candy Tyrrell Team	Tyrrell 009	Ford Cosworth DFV 3.0 V8						BEL; 11	MON; Ret	FRA; 5	GBR; 3	GER	AUT	NED; Ret	ITA; 6	CAN; Ret	USA; Ret			11th	14
1980	Candy Tyrrell Team	Tyrrell 009	Ford Cosworth DFV 3.0 V8	ARG; Ret	BRA; 12																13th	6
1980	Candy Tyrrell Team	Tyrrell 010	Ford Cosworth DFV 3.0 V8			RSA; 7	USW; Ret	BEL; 5	MON; Ret	FRA; Ret	GBR; 5	GER; 15	AUT; Ret	NED; 5	ITA; 13	CAN; 7	USA; NC				13th	6
1981	Équipe Talbot Gitanes	Ligier JS17	Matra MS81 3.0 V12	USW; Ret	BRA; 7	ARG	SMR	BEL	MON	ESP	FRA										NC	0
1981	Denim Osella	Osella FA1B	Ford Cosworth DFV 3.0 V8									GBR; 8	GER; 8	AUT; 10	NED; Ret						NC	0
1981	Denim Osella	Osella FA1C	Ford Cosworth DFV 3.0 V8													ITA; 9	CAN; Ret	CPL; Ret			NC	0
1982	Denim S.A.I.M.A. Osella	Osella FA1C	Ford Cosworth DFV 3.0 V8	RSA; Ret	BRA; 9	USW; Ret	SMR; 4	BEL; Ret	MON; DNQ	DET; Ret	CAN; Ret	NED; 14	GBR; Ret	FRA; Ret							20th	3
1982	Denim S.A.I.M.A. Osella	Osella FA1D	Ford Cosworth DFV 3.0 V8												GER; Ret	AUT; DNQ	SUI; Ret	ITA; Ret	CPL; DNS		20th	3
1983	Équipe Ligier Gitanes	Ligier JS21	Ford Cosworth DFV 3.0 V8	BRA; Ret	USW; Ret	FRA; 9	SMR; Ret	MON; Ret	BEL; Ret	DET; Ret	CAN; Ret										NC	0
1983	Équipe Ligier Gitanes	Ligier JS21	Ford Cosworth DFY 3.0 V8									GBR; 10	GER; 8	AUT; 7	NED; Ret	ITA; 9	EUR; Ret	RSA; 10			NC	0

=== Complete Formula One non-championship results ===
(key) (Races in bold indicate pole position, races in italics indicate fastest lap)

Year	Entrant	Chassis	Engine	1	2	3	4	5	6	7	8
1971	Shell-Arnold Team	March 701	Ford Cosworth DFV 3.0 V8	ARG	ROC	QUE	SPR	INT	RIN	OUL; NC	VIC
1974	UOP Shadow Racing Team	Shadow DN3	Ford Cosworth DFV 3.0 V8	PRE	ROC; DNS	INT; 3					
1975	UOP Shadow Racing Team	Shadow DN5	Ford Cosworth DFV 3.0 V8	ROC; 8	INT	**SUI**; Ret					
1976	Shadow Racing Team	Shadow DN5	Ford Cosworth DFV 3.0 V8	ROC	INT; 5						
1979	Candy Tyrrell Team	Tyrrell 009	Ford Cosworth DFV 3.0 V8	ROC	GNM	DIN; 5					
1980	Candy Tyrrell Team	Tyrrell 010	Ford Cosworth DFV 3.0 V8	ESP; 4							

=== 24 Hours of Le Mans results ===
Year	Team	Co-Drivers	Car	Class	Laps	Pos.	Class Pos.
1972	(United States) North American Racing Team	(France) Claude Buchet	Ferrari 365 GTB/4	GT; 5.0	297	9th	5th
1974	(France) Équipe Gitanes	(France) Jean-Pierre Beltoise	Matra-Simca MS680	S 3.0	104	DNF	DNF
1975	(France) Gitanes Automobiles Ligier	(France) Jean-Pierre Beltoise	Ligier JS2-Maserati	S 3.0	36	DNF	DNF
1977	(United States) Grand Touring Cars Inc. (France) Mirage Renault	(Australia) Vern Schuppan	Mirage GR8-Renault	S +2.0	331	**2nd**	**2nd**
1978	(France) Équipe Renault Elf Sport	(United Kingdom) Derek Bell	Renault Alpine A442A	S +2.0	162	DNF	DNF
1979	(France) Jean-Pierre Jarier	(United States) Randy Townsend (France) Raymond Touroul	Porsche 935	IMSA +2.5	65	DNF	DNF
1981	(Germany) BASF Cassetten Team GS Sport	(Germany) Hans-Joachim Stuck (Germany) Helmut Henzler	BMW M1	IMSA; GTX	57	DNF	DNF
1984	(West Germany) Porsche Kremer Racing	(Australia) Vern Schuppan (Australia) Alan Jones	Porsche 956B	C1	337	6th	6th
1985	(Germany) Kremer Porsche Racing	(New Zealand) Mike Thackwell (Austria) Franz Konrad	Porsche 962C	C1	356	9th	9th
1988	(Australia) Takefuji Schuppan Racing Team	(United Kingdom) Brian Redman (Sweden) Eje Elgh	Porsche 962C	C1	359	10th	10th
1995	(France) Larbre Compétition	(Spain) Jesús Pareja (France) Érik Comas	Porsche 911 GT2 Evo	GT1	64	DNF	DNF
1996	(Germany) Roock Racing Team	(Spain) Jesús Pareja (United Kingdom) Dominic Chappell	Porsche 911 GT2 Evo	GT1	93	DNF	DNF
1997	(France) Société Chéreau	(France) Jean-Luc Chéreau (France) Jack Leconte	Porsche 911 GT2	GT2	77	DNF	DNF
1998	(France) Larbre Compétition	(Sweden) Carl Rosenblad (United Kingdom) Robin Donovan	Porsche 911 GT2	GT2	164	DNF	DNF
1999	(France) Larbre Compétition	(France) Sébastien Bourdais (France) Pierre de Thoisy	Porsche 911 GT2	GTS	134	DNF	DNF

Sporting positions
Preceded by Mike Hailwood	European Formula Two; Champion; 1973	Succeeded by Patrick Depailler
