= Tyrrell 009 =

Formula One racing car

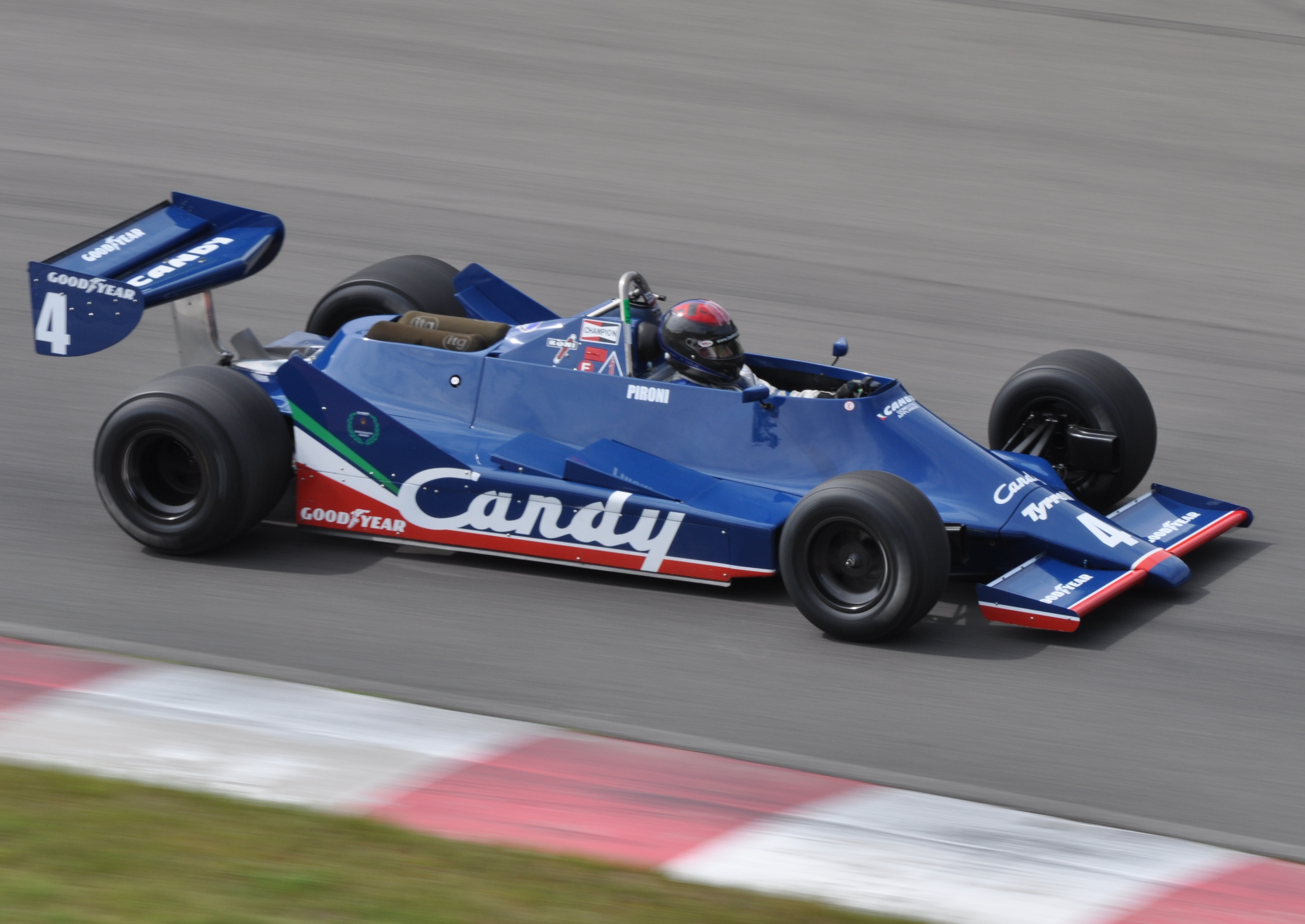
- Greg Galdi driving the 009 of Didier Pironi during the 2010 Legends of Motorsport meeting at Circuit Mont-Tremblant
- Category: Formula One
- Constructor: Tyrrell Racing Organisation
- Designer: Maurice Philippe
- Predecessor: 008
- Successor: 010

Technical specifications
- Chassis: Aluminium monocoque
- Suspension (front): Double wishbone with pullrod operated coil springs
- Suspension (rear): Double wishbone with pullrod operated coil springs
- Engine: Ford-Cosworth DFV, 2,993 cc (182.6 cu in), 90° V8, NA, mid-engine, longitudinally mounted
- Transmission: Hewland FGA 400 6-speed manual
- Fuel: 1979: Elf
- Tyres: 1979: Goodyear; 1980: Goodyear

Competition history
- Notable entrants: Candy Team Tyrrell; Team Tyrrell
- Notable drivers: (France) Didier Pironi (France) Jean-Pierre Jarier (United Kingdom) Geoff Lees (Republic of Ireland) Derek Daly
- Debut: 1979 Argentine Grand Prix
- Last event: 1980 South African Grand Prix
| Races | Wins | Poles | F/Laps |
|---|---|---|---|
| 17 | 0 | 0 | 0 |
- Constructors' Championships: 0
- Drivers' Championships: 0
- Unless otherwise stated, all data refer to Formula One World Championship Grands Prix only.

The Tyrrell 009 was a Formula One racing car that was designed by Maurice Philippe for Tyrrell Racing for the 1979 season.

The 009 was powered by the Ford-Cosworth DFV V8 engine and made its competition debut in the first race of the season in Argentina. The 009s were driven by Frenchmen Didier Pironi and Jean-Pierre Jarier, with Jarier being replaced by Englishman Geoff Lees for the German GP and Irishman Derek Daly for the Austrian GP. Daly also drove a third car at the final two races of the season. For the 1980 season, the 009 competed in the first two races before being replaced by the Tyrrell 010.

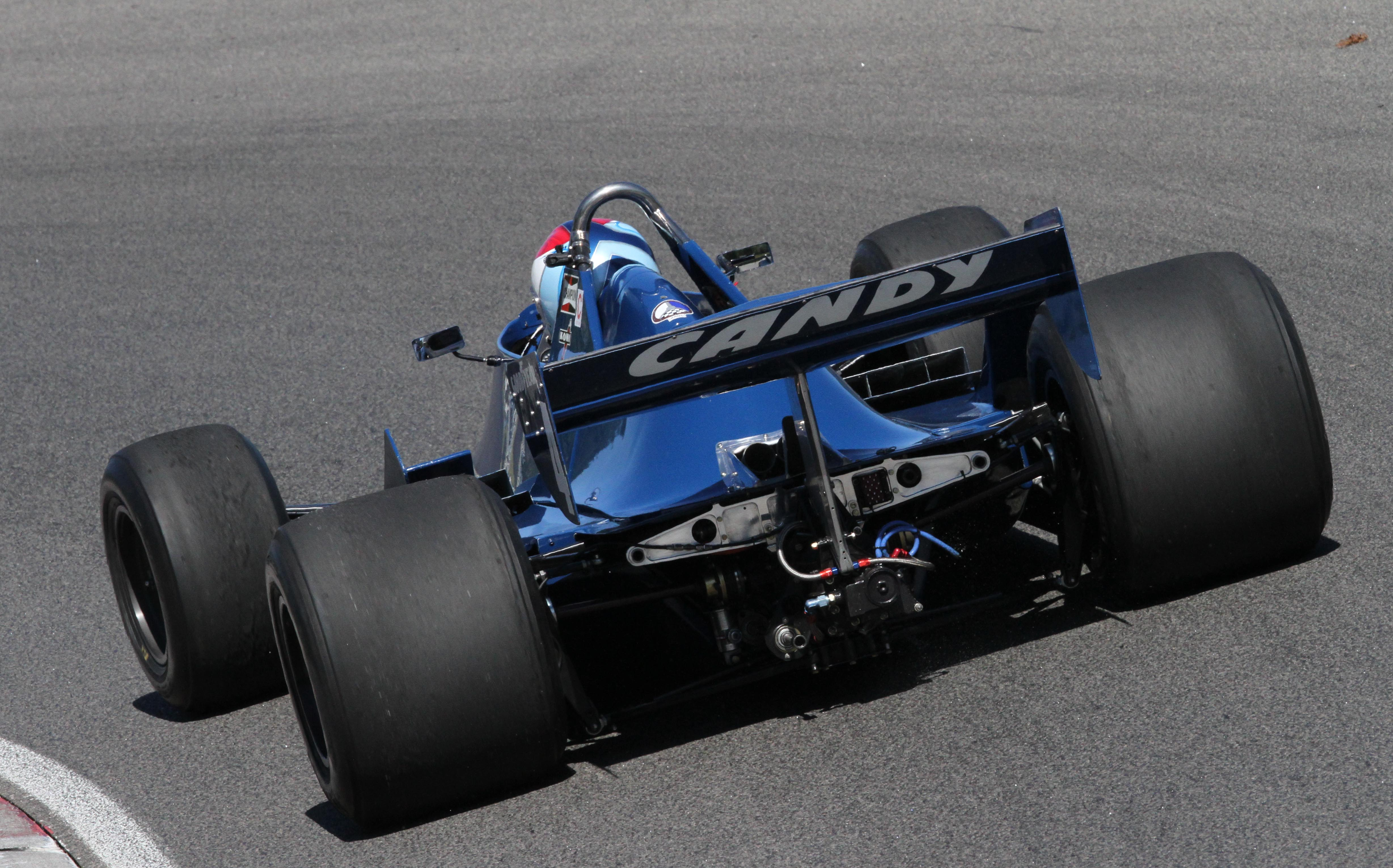
An Ex-Didier Pironi Tyrrell 009 during the 2010 Legends of Motorsport meeting at Circuit Mont-Tremblant

== Complete Formula One World Championship results ==
(key) (results in italics indicate fastest lap, results in bold indicate pole position)

| Year | Entrant | Engine | Tyres | Drivers | 1 | 2 | 3 | 4 | 5 | 6 | 7 | 8 | 9 | 10 | 11 | 12 | 13 | 14 | 15 | Pts | WCC |
|---|---|---|---|---|---|---|---|---|---|---|---|---|---|---|---|---|---|---|---|---|---|
| 1979 | Team Tyrrell; Candy Team Tyrrell | Cosworth DFV; V8 NA | G | | ARG | BRA | RSA | USW | ESP | BEL | MON | FRA | GBR | GER | AUT | NED | ITA | CAN | USA | 28 | 5th |
| 1979 | Team Tyrrell; Candy Team Tyrrell | Cosworth DFV; V8 NA | G | Didier Pironi | Ret | 4 | Ret | DSQ | 6 | 3 | Ret | Ret | 10 | 9 | 7 | Ret | 10 | 5 | 3 | 28 | 5th |
| 1979 | Team Tyrrell; Candy Team Tyrrell | Cosworth DFV; V8 NA | G | Jean-Pierre Jarier | Ret | Ret | 3 | 6 | 5 | 11 | Ret | 5 | 3 | | | Ret | 6 | Ret | Ret | 28 | 5th |
| 1979 | Team Tyrrell; Candy Team Tyrrell | Cosworth DFV; V8 NA | G | Geoff Lees | | | | | | | | | | 7 | | | | | | 28 | 5th |
| 1979 | Team Tyrrell; Candy Team Tyrrell | Cosworth DFV; V8 NA | G | Derek Daly | | | | | | | | | | | 8 | | | Ret | Ret | 28 | 5th |
| 1980 | Candy Team Tyrrell | Cosworth DFV; V8 NA | G | | ARG | BRA | RSA | USW | BEL | MON | FRA | GBR | GER | AUT | NED | ITA | CAN | USA | | 12* | 6th |
| 1980 | Candy Team Tyrrell | Cosworth DFV; V8 NA | G | Jean-Pierre Jarier | Ret | 12 | | | | | | | | | | | | | | 12* | 6th |
| 1980 | Candy Team Tyrrell | Cosworth DFV; V8 NA | G | Derek Daly | 4 | 14 | Ret | | | | | | | | | | | | | 12* | 6th |

* 9 points scored in 1980 using the Tyrrell 010
