= Tyrrell 008 =

Formula One racing car

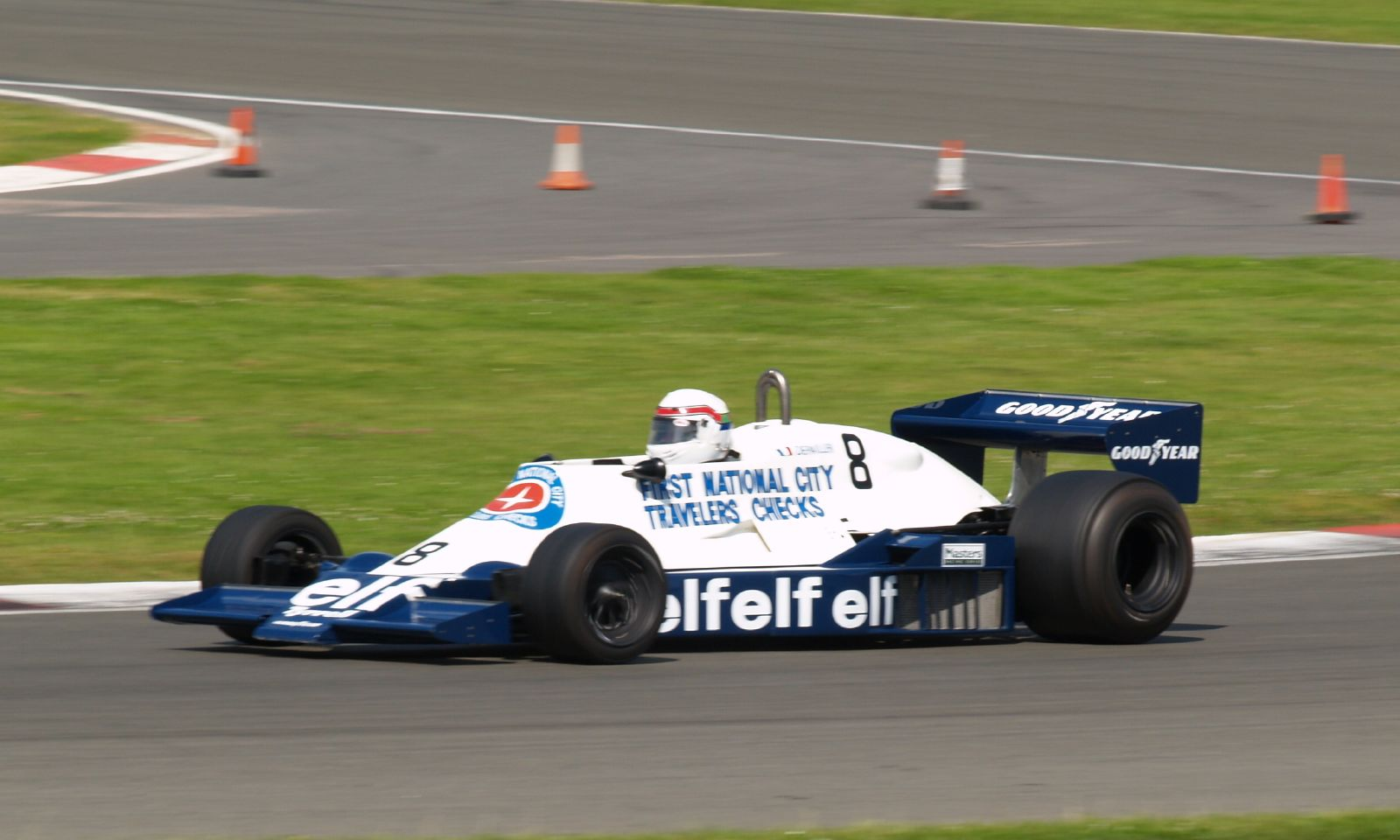
- The demonstration of the 008 during the 2007 Silverstone Classic
- Category: Formula One
- Constructor: Tyrrell Racing Organisation
- Designer: Maurice Philippe
- Predecessor: P34
- Successor: 009

Technical specifications
- Chassis: Aluminium monocoque
- Axle track: Front: 1,702 mm (67.0 in); Rear: 1,600 mm (63 in)
- Wheelbase: 2,700 mm (110 in)
- Engine: Cosworth DFV V8 NA
- Transmission: Hewland FGA 400 5-speed manual
- Weight: 590 kg (1,300 lb)
- Fuel: Elf
- Tyres: Goodyear

Competition history
- Notable entrants: Elf Team Tyrrell
- Notable drivers: 3. (France) Didier Pironi; 4. (France) Patrick Depailler
- Debut: 1978 Argentine Grand Prix
- First win: 1978 Monaco Grand Prix
- Last win: 1978 Monaco Grand Prix
- Last event: 1978 Canadian Grand Prix
Races	Wins	Poles	F/Laps
16	1	0	0
- Constructors' Championships: 0
- Drivers' Championships: 0

The Tyrrell 008 was a Formula One car manufactured and raced by the Tyrrell Racing Organisation team during the 1978 season. Driven by Didier Pironi and Patrick Depailler, it achieved several podium finishes including a win at the 1978 Monaco Grand Prix.

== Development ==
The Tyrrell 008 was designed by Maurice Philippe to replace the six-wheeler Tyrrell P34 used the previous two seasons. It used an aluminum monocoque in front of a V8 Cosworth DFV.

The 008 was originally conceived as a fan car, similar to the Brabham BT46. The idea was to position the radiators in the underside of the car, in turn tidying up the aerodynamics, and use the fan to extract heat from them. A small rear mounted fan had been developed to cool the oil and water radiators with the added bonus of aerodynamic downforce, but unlike Gordon Murray's effort, the team could not get the technology to work effectively. The car regularly overheated during testing and the fan was quietly dropped. Murray's assistant, David Cox, had however observed the 008 in testing and gave his boss all of the details that he could.

== Racing history ==
For 1978, Tyrrell brought in Didier Pironi to drive alongside Patrick Depailler. The 008 made its debut in the season opening Argentine Grand Prix, where Depailler qualified 10th and finished in third. Although he retired from the following Brazilian Grand Prix, he recorded consecutive podiums at the next three events; a second in South Africa, a third in the United States and his maiden win in Monaco, where he achieved his best qualifying of the year, fifth. He scored three more points finishes during the remainder of the season, the best of these second in the Austrian Grand Prix. Reliability was an issue for he only finished eight races.

Pironi was 23rd on the grid in Argentina and brought his car home in 14th place. He scored a point for sixth place at the next race in Brazil, the first of his five-point finishes for 1978. His best placing was 5th, achieved twice, in Monaco and Germany. His best qualifying was ninth, in Austria, one of only two races where he out-qualified Depailler.

The team finished in fourth place in the Constructor's Championship with a total of 38 points. Depailler was fifth in the Driver's Championship with 34 points while Pironi was 15th with seven points.

== Complete Formula One World Championship results ==
(key) (Results in bold indicate pole position; results in italics indicate fastest lap.)

Year	Entrant	Engine	Tyres	Drivers	1	2	3	4	5	6	7	8	9	10	11	12	13	14	15	16	Points	WCC
1978	Elf Team Tyrrell	Ford V8	**G**		ARG	BRA	RSA	USW	MON	BEL	ESP	SWE	FRA	GBR	GER	AUT	NED	ITA	USA	CAN	**38**	**4th**
1978	Elf Team Tyrrell	Ford V8	**G**	Didier Pironi	14	6	6	Ret	5	6	12	Ret	10	Ret	5	Ret	Ret	Ret	10	7	**38**	**4th**
1978	Elf Team Tyrrell	Ford V8	**G**	Patrick Depailler	3	Ret	2	3	1	Ret	Ret	Ret	Ret	4	Ret	2	Ret	11	Ret	5	**38**	**4th**
