= Tyrrell Racing =

British motor racing team

Tyrrell
- Full name: Tyrrell Racing Organisation
- Base: Ockham, Surrey, United Kingdom
- Founder(s): Ken Tyrrell
- Noted staff: Derek Gardner; Mike Gascoyne; Tim Densham; Harvey Postlethwaite
- Noted drivers: (France) Patrick Depailler (France) Jean Alesi (France) Didier Pironi (South Africa) Jody Scheckter (United Kingdom) Jackie Stewart (Italy) Andrea de Cesaris (France) François Cevert (Germany) Stefan Bellof (Sweden) Ronnie Peterson (Republic of Ireland) Derek Daly (Netherlands) Jos Verstappen (United Kingdom) Martin Brundle (United Kingdom) Jonathan Palmer (Italy) Michele Alboreto (Finland) Mika Salo
- Next name: British American Racing

Formula One World Championship career
- First entry: 1968 South African Grand Prix (as Matra International); 1970 South African Grand Prix (as Tyrrell Racing Organisation)
- Races entered: 23 entries (23 starts) (as Matra International); 442 entries (440 starts) (as Tyrrell Racing Organisation)
- Constructors: Matra; March; Tyrrell
- Constructors' Championships: 2 (1969 for Matra, 1971 for themselves - as Tyrrell Racing Organisation)
- Drivers' Championships: 3 (1969 as Matra International, 1971, 1973 as Tyrrell Racing Organisation)
- Race victories: 9 (as Matra International); 24 (as Tyrrell Racing Organisation)
- Pole positions: 2 (as Matra International); 17 (as Tyrrell Racing Organisation)
- Fastest laps: 9 (as Matra International); 18 (as Tyrrell Racing Organisation)
- Final entry: 1969 Mexican Grand Prix (as Matra International); 1998 Japanese Grand Prix (as Tyrrell Racing Organisation)

Tyrrell as a Formula One chassis constructor
Formula One World Championship career
- Entrants: Tyrrell Racing, several minor teams and privateers
- First entry: 1970 Canadian Grand Prix
- Last entry: 1998 Japanese Grand Prix
- Races entered: 432 entries (430 starts)
- Race victories: 23
- Constructors' Championships: 1 (1971)
- Drivers' Championships: 2 (1971, 1973)
- Pole positions: 14
- Fastest laps: 20

The Tyrrell Racing Organisation was an auto racing team and Formula One constructor founded by Ken Tyrrell (1924–2001) which started racing in 1958, entered Formula One as the privateer team Matra International and started building its own cars in 1970. The team experienced its greatest success from 1969 to 1973, when it won three Drivers' Championships, one Constructors' Championship for Matra and another for themselves, with Jackie Stewart as their main driver. The team never reached such heights again, although it continued to win races through the 1970s and into the early 1980s, taking the final win for the Ford Cosworth DFV engine at the 1983 Detroit Grand Prix. The team was bought by British American Tobacco in 1997 and completed its final season as Tyrrell in the 1998 Formula One season. Tyrrell's legacy continues as the Mercedes-AMG F1 team, who is Tyrrell's descendant through various sales and rebrandings via BAR, Honda, and Brawn GP.

== Lower formulas (1958–1967) ==
Tyrrell Racing first came into being in 1958, running Formula Three cars for Ken Tyrrell and local stars. Realising he was not racing driver material, Ken Tyrrell stood down as a driver in 1959, and began to run a Formula Junior operation using the woodshed owned by his family business, Tyrrell Brothers, as a workshop. Throughout the 1960s, Tyrrell moved through the lower formulas, variously giving single seater debuts to John Surtees and Jacky Ickx. The team's most famous partnership was the one forged with Jackie Stewart, who first signed up in 1963.

Tyrrell ran the BRM Formula Two operation throughout 1965, 1966 and 1967 whilst Stewart was signed to BRM's Formula One team. The team then signed a deal to run F2 cars made by French company Matra. Tyrrell's first entry into a World Championship Grand Prix was at the 1966 German Grand Prix, entering F2-spec Matra MS5s for Ickx and Hubert Hahne. Hahne finished 9th, runner-up of the F2 cars. However, Ickx was involved in a first-lap crash with the Brabham of John Taylor, who later died from burns sustained in the accident. Tyrrell later entered the 1967 German Grand Prix with an F2 car for Ickx, this time the Matra MS7. Ickx qualified with the 3rd-fastest time, however F2 cars were required to start the race from the back of the grid. He ran as high as 5th before retiring from the race with a broken suspension.

== Formula One (1968–1998) ==
=== 1960s ===
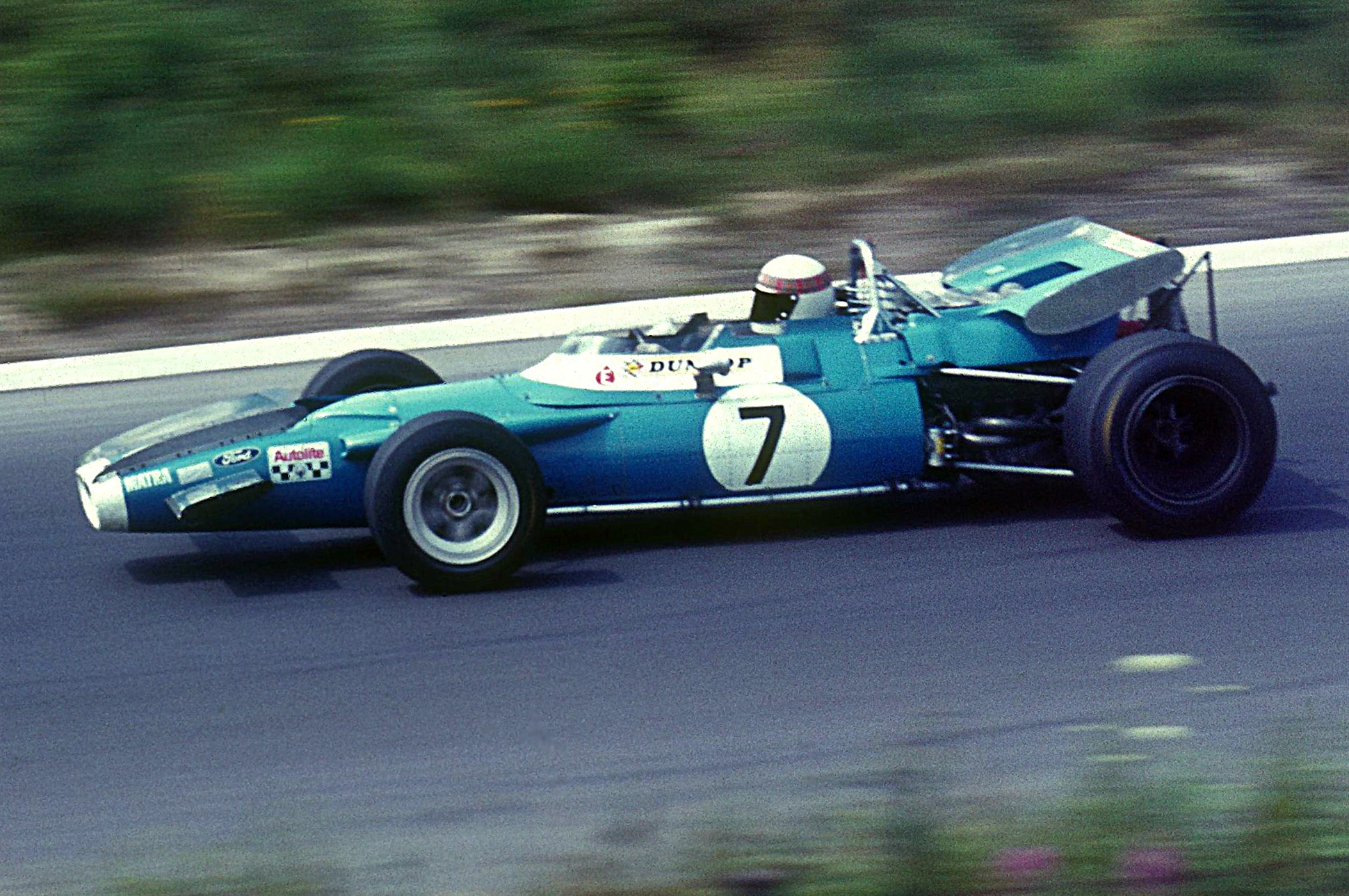
Jackie Stewart and Tyrrell won their first championship with the French Matra chassis.

With the help of Elf and Ford, Tyrrell then achieved his dream of moving to Formula One in 1968 as a team principal for the team officially named Matra International, a joint-venture established between Tyrrell's own privateer team and the French auto manufacturer Matra. Stewart was a serious contender, winning three Grands Prix in the Tyrrell-run Matra MS10. The car's most innovative feature was the use of aviation-inspired structural fuel tanks. These allowed the chassis to be around 15 kg lighter while still being stronger than its competitors. The FIA considered the technology to be unsafe and decided to ban it for 1970, insisting on rubber bag-tanks.

For the 1969 championship, the Matra works team decided not to compete in Formula One. Matra would instead focus its efforts on Ken Tyrrell's 'Matra International' team and build a new DFV powered car with structural fuel tanks, even though it would only be eligible for a single season. Stewart won the 1969 title easily, driving the new Cosworth-powered Matra MS80 which corrected most of the weaknesses of the MS10. Stewart's title was the first won by a French car, and the only one won by a car built in France as well as by a car entered by a privateer team. It was a spectacular achievement from the British team and the French constructor that both had only entered Formula One the previous year.

=== 1970s ===
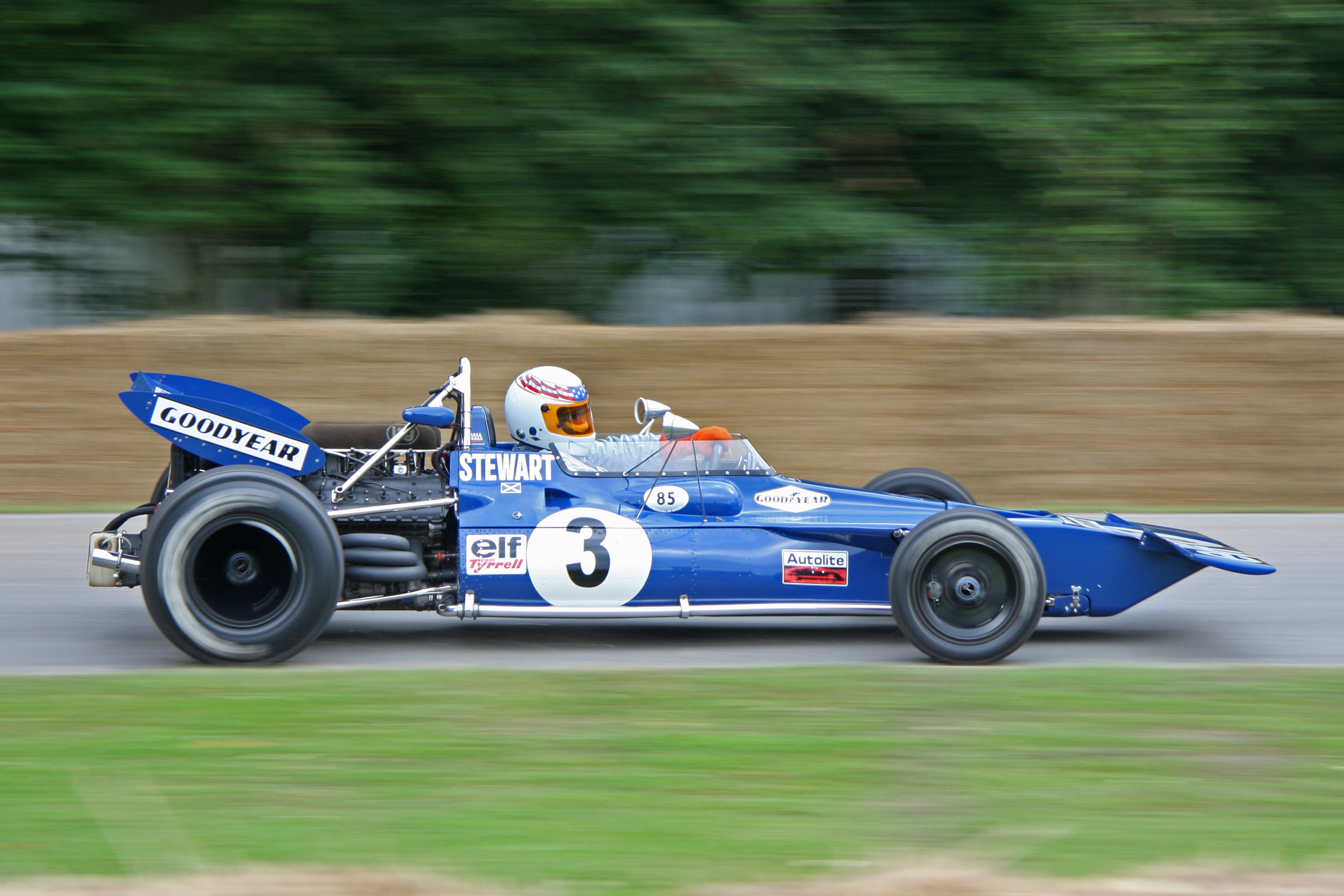
Tyrrell's first F1 car, the 001, being demonstrated at the 2008 Goodwood Festival of Speed

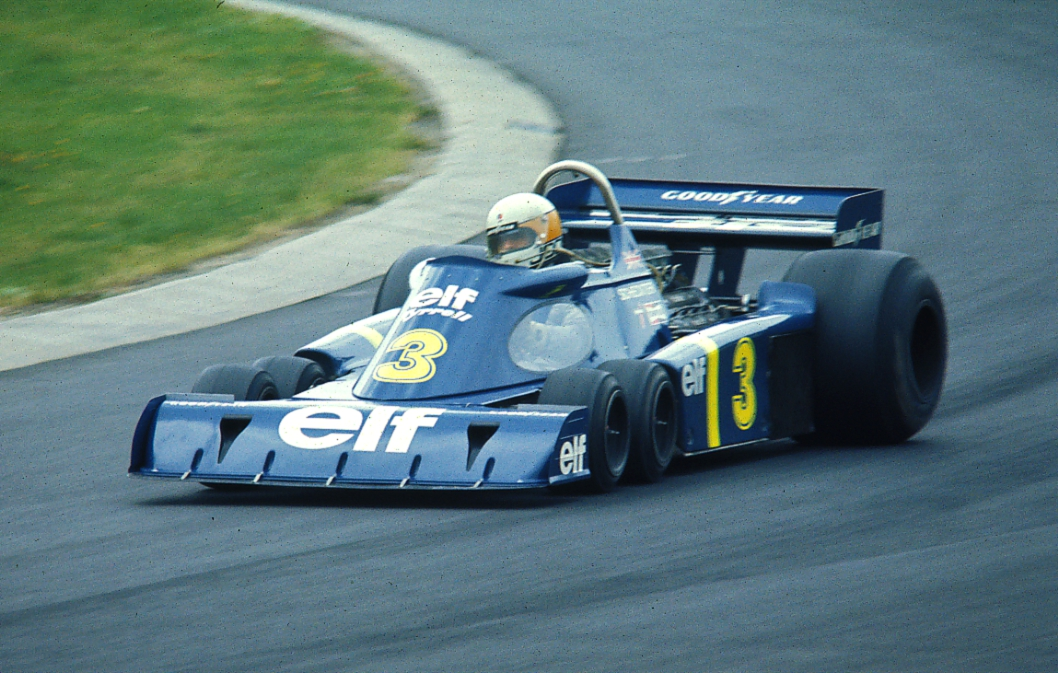
The Tyrrell P34 six-wheeler

For the 1970 season following Matra's merger with Simca, Tyrrell were asked by Matra to use their V12 rather than the Cosworth. Simca was a subsidiary of the American company Chrysler, a rival of Ford.

1971 Tyrrell-Cosworth 002

Stewart tested the Matra V12 and found it inferior to the DFV. As a large part of the Tyrrell budget was provided by Ford, and another significant element came from French state-owned petroleum company Elf, which had an agreement with Renault that precluded supporting a Simca partner, Ken Tyrrell had little alternative but to buy a March 701 chassis as interim solution while developing his own car in secret. As a result, the name of his team Matra International was officially changed to Tyrrell Racing Organisation at the beginning of the 1970 season.

Tyrrell was still sponsored by French fuel company Elf, and Tyrrell would retain the traditional French blue racing colours for most of the rest of its existence. Tyrrell and Stewart ran the March-Fords throughout 1970 with mixed success, while Derek Gardner worked on the first in-house Tyrrell Grand Prix car at the woodshed in Ockham, Surrey.

The privateer team owned by Ken Tyrrell, which competed under the name Matra International from 1968 to 1969 and under the name Tyrrell Racing Organisation in 1970, won 10 races in total during this period with the Matra MS10, Matra MS80 and March 701 cars as well as one World Drivers' Championship (in 1969 with the Matra MS80 car), thus becoming the most successful privateer team in Formula One history.

The Tyrrell 001, which bore much resemblance to the Matra MS80, emerged at the end of the 1970 season in the Canadian GP where Stewart achieved a pole position, making Tyrrell one of only a few constructors that achieved a pole position at the very first race. However, the car suffered mechanical failures in all of its three race starts. The nearly identical Tyrrell 003 won both Drivers' and Constructors' Championships in 1971, with strong driving from Jackie Stewart and François Cevert. Stewart's 1972 challenge was ruined by a stomach ulcer, but he returned to full fitness in 1973. He and Cevert finished first and fourth in the Championship, but Cevert was killed in practice for the final race of the season, the US Grand Prix at Watkins Glen. Stewart, who was to retire at the end of the season, and Tyrrell immediately stood down, effectively handing the Constructors' title to Lotus. At the end of the season Stewart made public his decision to retire, a decision that was already made before the US Grand Prix. Without their star driver or his skilled French protégé aboard, Tyrrell were never serious World Championship contenders again.

Despite this, the team remained a force throughout the 1970s, winning races with Jody Scheckter and Patrick Depailler. Most notable of these was Scheckter's triumph at the 1976 Swedish Grand Prix, giving Tyrrell a 1–2 finish driving the distinctive Derek Gardner designed Tyrrell P34 car. The P34 was the first (and only) successful six-wheeler F1 car, which replaced the conventional front wheels with smaller wheels mounted in banks of two on either side of the car. The design was abandoned after Goodyear refused to develop the small tyres needed for the car as they were too busy fighting the other tyre manufacturers in Formula One.

Ken Tyrrell had been spending a lot of his own money running his team, but in the summer of 1979 he finally found a sponsor: Italian appliance manufacturing group Candy put up the money to run the 009, fielded by Jarier and Pironi.

=== 1980s ===
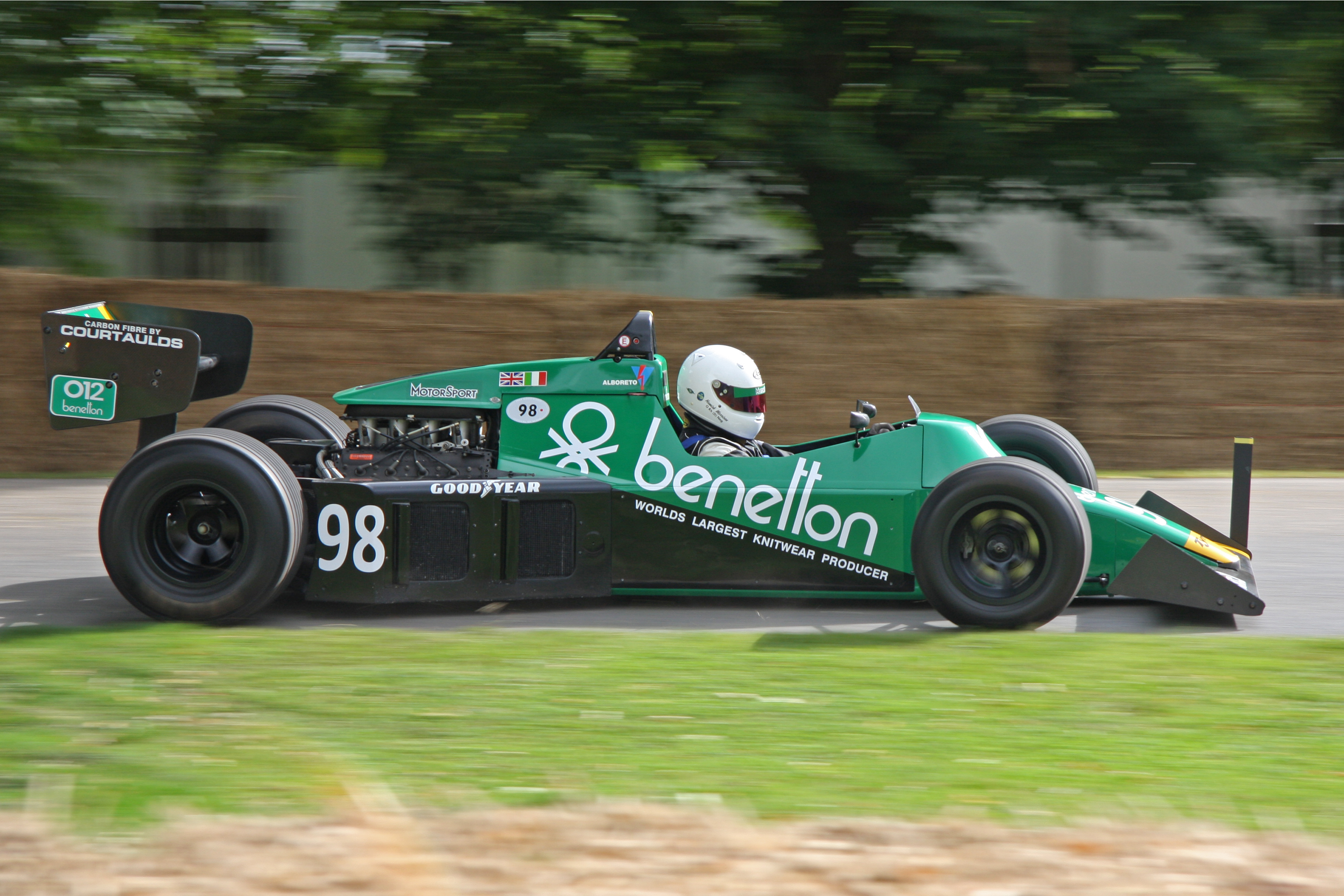
The Tyrrell 012 (pictured at the 2008 Goodwood Festival of Speed) raced from 1983 to 1985.

In 1977, the Turbo era dawned in Grand Prix racing, which was, by the mid-1980s, to render normally-aspirated-engined cars obsolete. Without the proper funding, Tyrrell was the last to race with the Cosworth DFV when all other teams had switched to turbocharged engines; during the height of FISA-FOCA war, Ken Tyrrell was adamant that turbochargers constitute a form of turbine, which had been banned in 1971, a protest that was rejected by FIA stewards. It was the beginning of two decades of struggle for Tyrrell, who was often underfunded through lack of sponsorship. It seemed appropriate, then, that the final win for the classic Cosworth Ford DFV engine was taken by a Tyrrell car (the Tyrrell 011), driven by Michele Alboreto at the 1983 Detroit Grand Prix. It was also Tyrrell's last Grand Prix win.

==== 1984 controversy ====
At the time, the Formula One regulations specified a minimum weight which was more than achievable with non-turbocharged cars—though not with a turbocharged car due to greater complexity—leading to some cars being built light and ballasted up to the minimum weight to optimise weight distribution. However, rules then also specified that the cars were to be weighed filled with their usual fluids. In 1982, other teams (chiefly Brabham and Williams) had used this provision to develop cars with features such as 'water-cooled brakes'—the car officially started the race with a large, full water tank, the water was released in the general direction of the brakes and the car ran underweight when on track and unable to be weighed, only to be later topped up sufficient water to ensure the weight limit was not breached.

As Tyrrell was the only naturally aspirated engine user in the 1984 season, they were uniquely placed to be able to benefit from a similar strategy of the water brake. In Tyrrell's case, the engine was equipped with a water injection system (a common means of lowering cylinder temperatures to increase power), whose supply tank was to be topped up late in the race. In addition, the FIA had already made provision to reduce the fuel allowance for each race during the season to 220 litres and banned the refueling of 1982–83, reducing the power available to turbocharged runners while imposing little restriction on more efficient non-turbo runners. Predictably, turbo-powered teams were against this move, leaving only Tyrrell – whose engine did not need the additional fuel – in favour of it. However, F1 rules required unanimity for the change to be scrapped, leaving Tyrrell in the way.

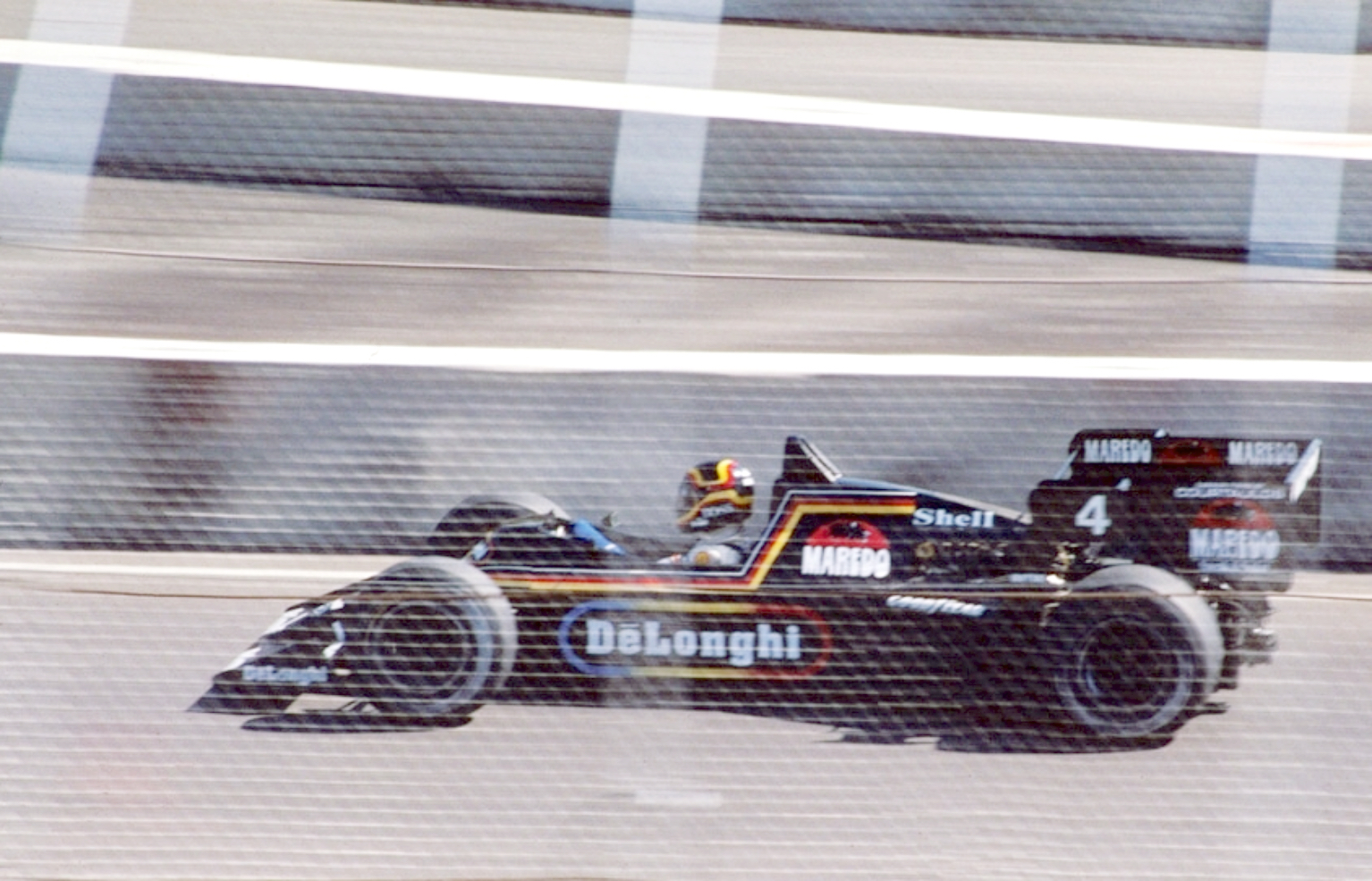
Stefan Bellof driving for Tyrrell during the team's controversial 1984 season

In several races, after Tyrrell's final pit stop, lead shot could be seen escaping from the top of the car. It turned out that Tyrrell were running the car underweight during the race then, in the closing stages, topping up water injection supply tanks with an additional two gallons of water mixed with 140 lb of lead shot to ensure it made the weight limit. As this was pumped in under significant pressure, some escaped through the tank vent and rained down on neighbouring pits, in sufficient quantities for other teams to sweep the shot away before their drivers pitted.

After the Detroit Grand Prix where Martin Brundle had finished in second for Tyrrell, the top cars were, as usual, impounded for inspection for compliance with the rules. Following this, it was alleged that the water was likely 27.5% aromatics and constituted an additional fuel source. Tyrrell were thus charged with:

1. Taking on additional fuel during the race (then illegal)
2. Use of illegal fuel (the aromatic-water mix)
3. Equipping the car with illegal fuel lines (the lines from the water tank to the water injection system)
4. Using ballast that was incorrectly fixed to the car (the lead shot in the water tank)

As a consequence of these charges, Tyrrell were excluded from the 1984 world championship and retroactively disqualified from all races that year. Further analysis showed that the actual fuel content of the water was significantly below 1% and well within rules. Additionally, Tyrrell argued that the requirement was that the ballast had to be fixed so it required tools to remove – which they felt was the case with the shot as contained within the water tank. Tyrrell subsequently went to the FIA court of appeal. On appeal, the evidence that the water's fuel content was in fact far lower than originally suggested was ignored, with the charges amended to:

1. The fuel in the water
2. Unsecured ballast
3. Illegal holes in the bottom of the car, in violation of flat bottom rules designed to eliminate ground effect (eventually determined to be vents of no aerodynamic effect)

Nonetheless, the international judging panel upheld the original decision; not only did Tyrrell remain excluded from the championship, they were banned from competing in the last three Grands Prix of the season. With the only non-turbo team officially no longer an entrant, the remaining teams had the unanimity they required to amend the rules as they wished. Tyrrell's exclusion meant they lost all points from the 1984 season and, with them, subsidised travel benefits to the following year's championship, a huge additional cost on top of fines for no-showing the races they were barred from.

The ban and exclusion was seen by some observers as tantamount to manipulation by the FIA who had been looking for a way to eliminate the remaining non-turbo cars from the grid to help attract more support and sponsorship from automotive manufacturers; Tyrrell ultimately adopted a turbo Renault engine mid-way through the following season and turbocharged engines became mandatory for 1986, although naturally-aspirated engines were allowed again in 1987. The ban also allowed the turbo teams to block a proposal from FISA to reduce the fuel allowance for 1985. A further blow followed when Stefan Bellof, one of the victims of the scheme, was killed at the 1985 1000 km of Spa.

=== 1990s ===
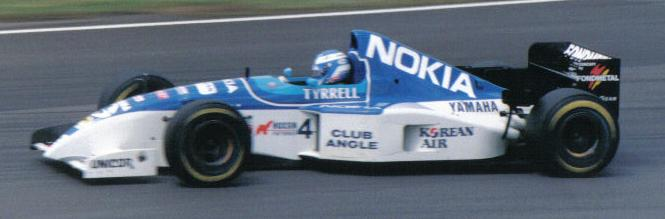
Mika Salo driving for Tyrrell at the 1995 British Grand Prix

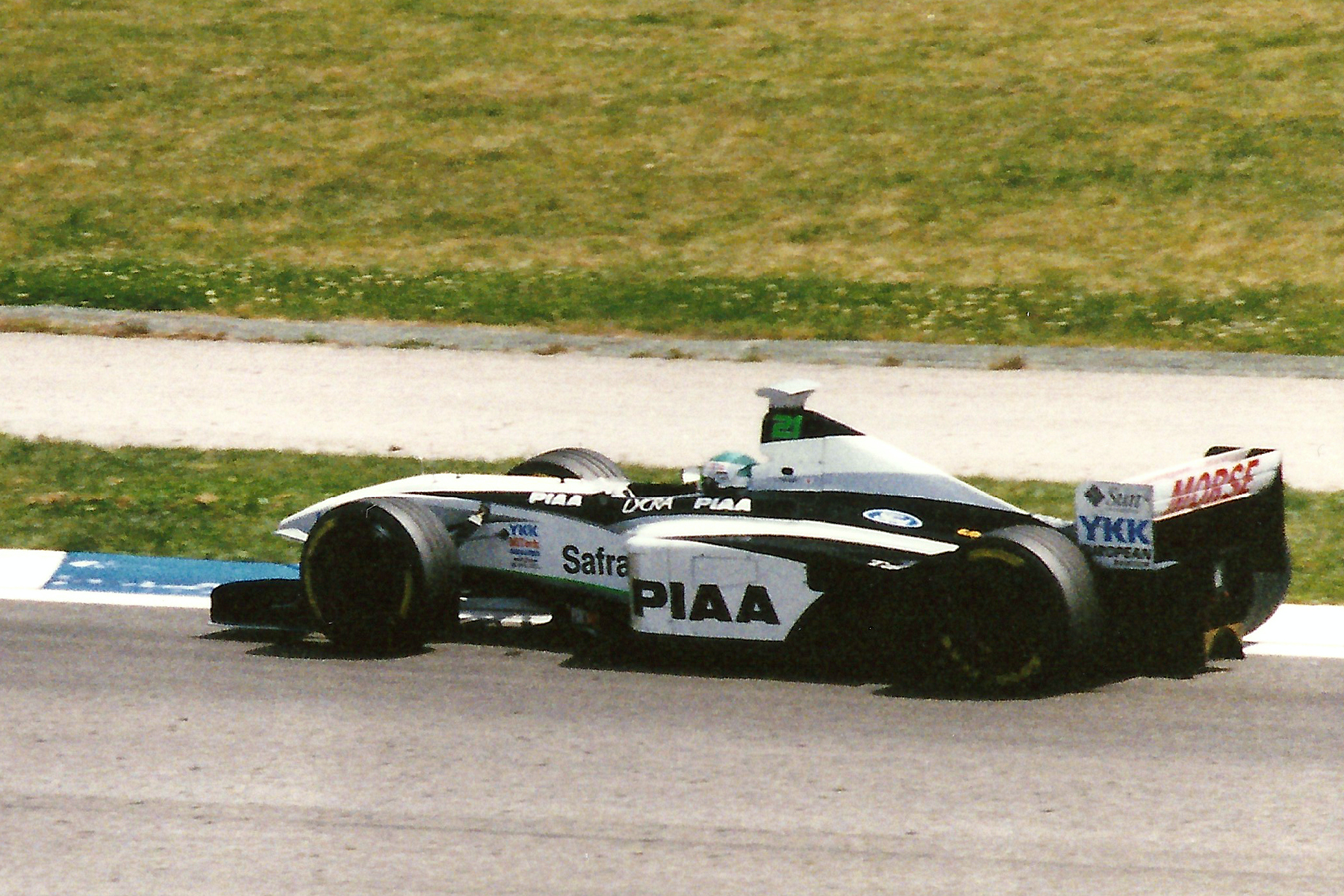
"Tora" Takagi driving the Tyrrell 026 at the 1998 Spanish Grand Prix

Tyrrell struggled on through the 1980s and 1990s – the team consistently punching above their financial weight following the 1984 controversy, despite winning the Colin Chapman Trophy for naturally-aspirated constructors in 1987 following Renault's withdrawal that year. There was a brief revival of fortunes in the early 1990s. The combination of Harvey Postlethwaite's revolutionary anhedral high-nose Tyrrell 019 and Jean Alesi's full debut season in 1990 brought the team two second places at Phoenix and Monaco – Alesi having led 30 laps of the Phoenix race. The French-Sicilian left the next year for Ferrari, but Honda engines and Braun sponsorship in 1991 helped Stefano Modena earn a front row start at Monaco alongside Ayrton Senna and a fine second-place finish at the 1991 Canadian Grand Prix, behind other Brazilian, Nelson Piquet. Nonetheless, the team slowly dropped back from the middle of the pack. Tyrrell's last F1 points were scored by Mika Salo at the 1997 Monaco Grand Prix.

Eventually, and in the face of dwindling form and ill health, Ken sold his team after the 1997 season to Craig Pollock, who at the same time was building British American Racing with his funding and sponsor partner British American Tobacco. Ken left the team following the sale, just before the start of the 1998 season, after a disagreement with Pollock over him choosing Ricardo Rosset for sponsorship money reasons over Jos Verstappen.

The final race for Tyrrell was the 1998 Japanese Grand Prix, where Rosset failed to qualify and teammate Tora Takagi retired on lap 28 after a collision with Esteban Tuero's Minardi.

=== Legacy ===
The double championship-winning Brawn GP team of 2009 and the present Mercedes team can loosely be said to be descendants of Tyrrell, through its predecessors, Honda Racing F1 and BAR. While BAR bought the Tyrrell F1 team and entry, they used a different factory, chassis builder and engine – most of the former Tyrrell cars and equipment were sold to Paul Stoddart, later owner of the Minardi F1 team.

When team boss Ross Brawn led a management buyout of the Honda F1 team to compete in the 2009 season, a revival of the Tyrrell name was briefly considered when deciding what to call the new team.

As of the 2026 Las Vegas Grand Prix, the teams which descended from Tyrrell have won 143 Grands Prix, 9 Drivers' championships (one as Brawn in 2009 and the rest as Mercedes: from 2014 to 2020 and in 2026) and 10 Constructors' championships (one as Brawn in 2009 and the rest as Mercedes from 2014 to 2021 and in 2026).

The Minardi 2-seater F1 cars are modifications of the 1998 Tyrrell 026 design, most noticeable in the distinctive shape of the nose of the car. These cars still run in demos today, most recently as demo cars during the launch of the Yas Marina Circuit.

The Tyrrell P34 was considered as one of the most unique and innovative race cars ever made due to its six wheel configuration. Several other teams attempted to use this wheel configuration including March and Williams.

Ken Tyrrell died of cancer on 25 August 2001 at the age of 77.

=== Modern Day Team Tyrrell ===
Bob Tyrrell continued to manage Tyrrell as a going concern, maintaining the trademarks globally and managing licensing activities under Tyrrell Promotions Limited, focused on model cars, artwork, and gaming and sim-racing. The Tyrrell brand and all associated rights were sold to a new private owner in 2023.

The new owner is set to bring the name back as an historic racing team, and has confirmed Team Tyrrell will be racing at the 2026 Monaco Historic.

== Racecars ==
Year	Car	Category
1970	Tyrrell 001	Formula One
1971	Tyrrell 002	Formula One
1971	Tyrrell 003	Formula One
1972	Tyrrell 004	Formula One
1972	Tyrrell 005	Formula One
1972	Tyrrell 006	Formula One
1974	Tyrrell 007	Formula One
1976	Tyrrell P34	Formula One
1977	Tyrrell P34B	Formula One
1978	Tyrrell 008	Formula One
1980	Tyrrell 009	Formula One
1981	Tyrrell 010	Formula One
1981	Tyrrell 011	Formula One
1983	Tyrrell 012	Formula One
1985	Tyrrell 014	Formula One
1986	Tyrrell 015	Formula One
1987	Tyrrell DG016	Formula One
1988	Tyrrell 017	Formula One
1989	Tyrrell 017B	Formula One
1989	Tyrrell 018	Formula One
1990	Tyrrell 019	Formula One
1991	Tyrrell 020	Formula One
1992	Tyrrell 020B	Formula One
1993	Tyrrell 020C	Formula One
1993	Tyrrell 021	Formula One
1994	Tyrrell 022	Formula One
1995	Tyrrell 023	Formula One
1996	Tyrrell 024	Formula One
1997	Tyrrell 025	Formula One
1998	Tyrrell 026	Formula One

== Formula One World Championship results ==
Formula One results
(**Bold** indicates championships won.)
Year	Name	Car	Engine	Tyres	Drivers	Points	WCC
1966	(United Kingdom) Matra International	MS5	Cosworth SCA 1.0 L4 BRM P80 1.0 L4	**D**	(Belgium) Jacky Ickx (Germany) Hubert Hahne	—N/a	—N/a
1967	(United Kingdom) Matra International	MS5	Cosworth FVA 1.6 L4	**D**	(Belgium) Jacky Ickx	—N/a	—N/a
1968	(United Kingdom) Matra International	MS9; MS10	Cosworth DFV 3.0 V8	**D**	(United Kingdom) Jackie Stewart (France) Jean-Pierre Beltoise (France) Johnny Servoz-Gavin	—N/a	—N/a
1969	(United Kingdom) Matra International	MS10; MS80; MS84; MS7	Cosworth DFV 3.0 V8; Cosworth FVA 1.6 L4	**D**	(United Kingdom) Jackie Stewart (France) Jean-Pierre Beltoise (France) Johnny Servoz-Gavin	—N/a	—N/a
1970	(United Kingdom) Tyrrell Racing Organisation	March 701; Tyrrell 001	Cosworth DFV 3.0 V8	**D**	(United Kingdom) Jackie Stewart (France) François Cevert (France) Johnny Servoz-Gavin	0	NC
1971	(United Kingdom) Elf Team Tyrrell	001; 002; 003	Cosworth DFV 3.0 V8	**G**	(United Kingdom) Jackie Stewart (France) François Cevert (United States) Peter Revson	**73**	**1st**
1972	(United Kingdom) Elf Team Tyrrell	002; 003; 004; 005; 006	Cosworth DFV 3.0 V8	**G**	(United Kingdom) Jackie Stewart (France) François Cevert (France) Patrick Depailler	51	2nd
1973	(United Kingdom) Elf Team Tyrrell	005; 006	Cosworth DFV 3.0 V8	**G**	(United Kingdom) Jackie Stewart (France) François Cevert (New Zealand) Chris Amon	82	2nd
1974	(United Kingdom) Elf Team Tyrrell	005; 006; 007	Cosworth DFV 3.0 V8	**G**	(South Africa) Jody Scheckter (France) Patrick Depailler	52	3rd
1975	(United Kingdom) Elf Team Tyrrell	007	Cosworth DFV 3.0 V8	**G**	(South Africa) Jody Scheckter (France) Patrick Depailler (France) Michel Leclère (France) Jean-Pierre Jabouille	25	5th
1976	(United Kingdom) Elf Team Tyrrell	007; P34	Cosworth DFV 3.0 V8	**G**	(South Africa) Jody Scheckter (France) Patrick Depailler	71	3rd
1977	(United Kingdom) First National City Elf Team Tyrrell	P34	Cosworth DFV 3.0 V8	**G**	(Sweden) Ronnie Peterson (France) Patrick Depailler	27	5th
1978	(United Kingdom) First National City Elf Team Tyrrell	008	Cosworth DFV 3.0 V8	**G**	(France) Patrick Depailler (France) Didier Pironi	38	4th
1979	(United Kingdom) Candy Tyrrell Team	009	Cosworth DFV 3.0 V8	**G**	(France) Didier Pironi (France) Jean-Pierre Jarier (United Kingdom) Geoff Lees (Republic of Ireland) Derek Daly	28	5th
1980	(United Kingdom) Candy Tyrrell Team	009; 010	Cosworth DFV 3.0 V8	**G**	(France) Jean-Pierre Jarier (Republic of Ireland) Derek Daly (New Zealand) Mike Thackwell	12	6th
1981	(United Kingdom) Tyrrell Racing Team	010; 011	Cosworth DFV 3.0 V8	**M** **A**	(United States) Eddie Cheever (United States) Kevin Cogan (Argentina) Ricardo Zunino (Italy) Michele Alboreto	10	8th
1982	(United Kingdom) Team Tyrrell	011	Cosworth DFV 3.0 V8	**G**	(Sweden) Slim Borgudd (United Kingdom) Brian Henton (Italy) Michele Alboreto	25	7th
1983	(United Kingdom) Benetton Tyrrell Team	011; 012	Cosworth DFV 3.0 V8	**G**	(United States) Danny Sullivan (Italy) Michele Alboreto	12	7th
1984	(United Kingdom) Tyrrell Racing Organisation	012	Cosworth DFY 3.0 V8	**G**	(United Kingdom) Martin Brundle (Sweden) Stefan Johansson (Germany) Stefan Bellof (New Zealand) Mike Thackwell	**0**	**DSQ** (Note: Tyrrell were disqualified from the 1984 World Championship due to a technical infringement.)
1985	(United Kingdom) Tyrrell Team	012; 014	Cosworth DFY 3.0 V8; Renault EF4B 1.5 V6 t	**G**	(United Kingdom) Martin Brundle (Sweden) Stefan Johansson (Germany) Stefan Bellof (Italy) Ivan Capelli (France) Philippe Streiff	4 (Tyrrell-Cosworth); 3 (Tyrrell-Renault)	9th (Tyrrell-Cosworth); 10th (Tyrrell-Renault)
1986	(United Kingdom) Data General Team Tyrrell	014; 015	Renault EF4B 1.5 V6 t	**G**	(United Kingdom) Martin Brundle (France) Philippe Streiff	11	7th
1987	(United Kingdom) Data General Team Tyrrell	DG016	Ford Cosworth DFZ 3.5 V8	**G**	(United Kingdom) Jonathan Palmer (France) Philippe Streiff	11	6th (Note: Winners of the Colin Chapman Trophy, with 169 points.)
1988	(United Kingdom) Tyrrell Racing Organisation	017	Ford Cosworth DFZ 3.5 V8	**G**	(United Kingdom) Jonathan Palmer (United Kingdom) Julian Bailey	5	8th
1989	(United Kingdom) Tyrrell Racing Organisation	017B; 018	Ford Cosworth DFR 3.5 V8	**G**	(United Kingdom) Jonathan Palmer (United Kingdom) Johnny Herbert (Italy) Michele Alboreto (France) Jean Alesi	16	5th
1990	(United Kingdom) Tyrrell Racing Organisation	018; 019	Ford Cosworth DFR 3.5 V8	**P**	(Japan) Satoru Nakajima (France) Jean Alesi	16	5th
1991	(United Kingdom) Braun Tyrrell Honda	020	Honda RA101E 3.5 V10	**P**	(Japan) Satoru Nakajima (Italy) Stefano Modena	12	6th
1992	(United Kingdom) Tyrrell	020B	Ilmor 2175A 3.5 V10	**G**	(France) Olivier Grouillard (Italy) Andrea de Cesaris	8	6th
1993	(United Kingdom) Tyrrell	020B; 021	Yamaha OX10A 3.5 V10	**G**	(Japan) Ukyo Katayama (Italy) Andrea de Cesaris	0	NC
1994	(United Kingdom) Tyrrell Racing Organisation	022	Yamaha OX10B 3.5 V10	**G**	(Japan) Ukyo Katayama (United Kingdom) Mark Blundell	13	7th
1995	(United Kingdom) Nokia Tyrrell Yamaha	023	Yamaha OX10C 3.5 V10	**G**	(Japan) Ukyo Katayama (Finland) Mika Salo (Italy) Gabriele Tarquini	5	8th
1996	(United Kingdom) Tyrrell Yamaha	024	Yamaha OX11A 3.5 V10	**G**	(Japan) Ukyo Katayama (Finland) Mika Salo	5	8th
1997	(United Kingdom) PIAA Tyrrell Ford	025	Ford ED4 3.0 V8; Ford ED5 3.0 V8	**G**	(Netherlands) Jos Verstappen (Finland) Mika Salo	2	10th
1998	(United Kingdom) PIAA Tyrrell	026	Ford JD Zetec-R 3.0 V10	**G**	(Brazil) Ricardo Rosset (Japan) Toranosuke Takagi	0	NC

== Notes ==
Sporting positions
Preceded by Lotus	Formula One Constructors' Champion; 1971	Succeeded by Lotus
