= Maurice Philippe =

British engineer and car designer (1932–1989)

- Born: 30 April 1932; Tooting, Greater London, England
- Died: 5 June 1989 (aged 57); West Byfleet, Surrey, England
- Other name: Maurice Phillippe
- Education: Latymer School
- Occupations: Formula One designer; Aircraft designer
- Years active: 1955–1989
- Employers: Team Lotus; Tyrrell Racing; March Engineering; De Havilland

Maurice Philippe (30 April 1932 – 5 June 1989), was a British aircraft and Formula One car designer.

== Early life and career ==
Philippe was born in Tooting and attended the The Latymer School in Edmonton. He began his career as an apprentice for De Havilland aircraft company, working on the Comet 4. De Havilland's technical department was home to other motor racing enthusiasts, including Brian Hart and Frank Costin. As a member of the 750 Motor Club, Philippe designed his first car in 1955, called the MPS (Maurice Philippe Special). Later, he would build a front-engined Formula Junior car alongside Hart, which was destroyed in its maiden race by Peter Warr.

== Motor racing ==
Between 1963 and 1964, Philippe raced a Lotus 7, and in 1965 was approached by Colin Chapman to be his "design team" at Team Lotus. Philippe and Chapman first redesigned the Lotus 39, then produced the Lotus 43, the classic Lotus 49, the Lotus 56 gas turbine Indy car, and finally the ground-breaking Lotus 72 in 1970.

In 1972, Philippe left Lotus and went to work for Parnelli Jones's USAC team, working on successful campaigns in the United States with drivers Al Unser Sr, Joe Leonard and Mario Andretti winning three United States Auto Club Championships and 53 Indy car races. Philippe would go on to design the Cosworth-Parnelli VPJ4 for F1, which was raced in 1975 by Mario Andretti.

In 1978, he replaced Derek Gardner as chief designer at Tyrrell, with the Tyrrell 008 finishing fourth in the Constructors' Championship. The 1979 Tyrrell 009 ground-effect car was less successful, only scoring four third places. In 1980, the Tyrrell 010 was introduced and was raced in modified form until 1981. He would be replaced by Harvey Postlethwaite.

In 1988, Philippe was hired by March Engineering to design their March 89CE Indycar, powered by Alfa Romeo.

== Death ==
Philippe committed suicide on 5 June 1989.
