= McLaren M29 =

Formula One racing car

McLaren M29 McLaren M29B McLaren M29C McLaren M29F
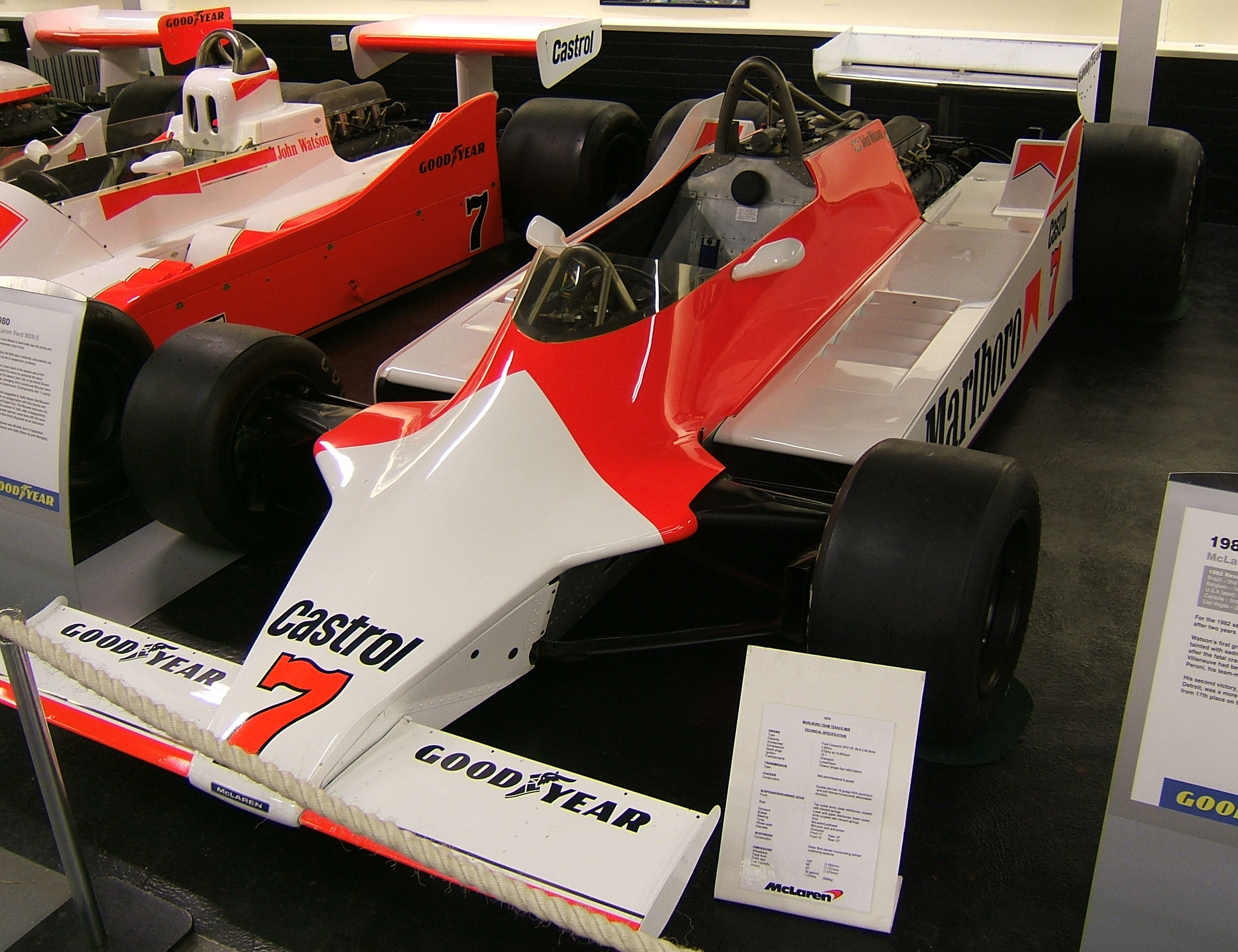
- John Watson's 1979-specification M29 housed in the Donington Grand Prix Collection in 2007
- Category: Formula One
- Constructor: McLaren
- Designer: Gordon Coppuck
- Predecessor: McLaren M28
- Successor: McLaren M30 technical McLaren MP4/1 chronological racing order

Technical specifications
- Chassis: Aluminium monocoque
- Axle track: 1,727 mm (68.0 in) (Front); 1,575 mm (62.0 in) (Rear)
- Engine: Ford-Cosworth DFV, 2,993 cc (3.0 L) V8, naturally aspirated, mid-engined, longitudinally mounted
- Transmission: McLaren / Hewland FGA 400/6 6-speed manual
- Power: See Table
- Tyres: Goodyear

Competition history
- Notable entrants: Marlboro Team McLaren/Marlboro McLaren International
- Notable drivers: 7. (United Kingdom) John Watson; 8. (Italy) Andrea de Cesaris; 8. (France) Alain Prost; 8. (France) Patrick Tambay; 8. (United Kingdom) Stephen South
- Debut: 1979 British Grand Prix
Races	Wins	Poles	F/Laps
26	0	0	0

The McLaren M29 is a Formula One racing car built and run by McLaren during the 1979 Formula One World Championship and the 1980 Formula One World Championship. The F version of the McLaren M29 was built in 1979, but only ran during five races of the 1981 Formula One World Championship. The M29F was the last of the M-numbered cars to be raced, as later in the season, the McLaren MP4/1 was readied for use in the championship.

== Specifications ==
Trim	Horsepower	HP RPM	Torque	Torque RPM	Weight	Dimensions (L x W x H x WB)			
A	513 hp (520 PS; 383 kW)	10,600	405 N⋅m (299 lb⋅ft)	9,500	545 kg (1,202 lb)	4,394 mm (173.0 in)	2,057 mm (81.0 in)	1,016 mm (40.0 in)	2,692 mm (106.0 in)
B	528 hp (535 PS; 394 kW)	10,600	420 N⋅m (310 lb⋅ft)	9,500	540 kg (1,190 lb)	4,394 mm (173.0 in)	2,057 mm (81.0 in)	1,016 mm (40.0 in)	2,692 mm (106.0 in)
C	533 hp (540 PS; 397 kW)	10,600	440 N⋅m (325 lb⋅ft)	9,500	530 kg (1,168 lb)	4,394 mm (173.0 in)	2,057 mm (81.0 in)	1,016 mm (40.0 in)	2,692 mm (106.0 in)
F	547 hp (555 PS; 408 kW)	10,600	450 N⋅m (332 lb⋅ft)	9,500	510 kg (1,124 lb)	4,394 mm (173.0 in)	2,057 mm (81.0 in)	1,016 mm (40.0 in)	2,692 mm (106.0 in)

== Complete Formula One World Championship results ==
(key) (results in bold indicate pole position) (results in italics indicate fastest lap)

Year	Entrant	Chassis	Engine	Tyres	Drivers	1	2	3	4	5	6	7	8	9	10	11	12	13	14	15	Points	WCC
1979	Marlboro Team McLaren	M29	Ford Cosworth DFV	G		ARG	BRA	RSA	USW	ESP	BEL	MON	FRA	GBR	GER	AUT	NED	ITA	CAN	USA	15*	7th
1979	Marlboro Team McLaren	M29	Ford Cosworth DFV	G	John Watson									4	5	9	Ret	Ret	6	6	15*	7th
1979	Marlboro Team McLaren	M29	Ford Cosworth DFV	G	Patrick Tambay										Ret	10	Ret	Ret	Ret	Ret	15*	7th
1980	Marlboro Team McLaren	M29B; M29C	Ford Cosworth DFV	G		ARG	BRA	RSA	USW	BEL	MON	FRA	GBR	GER	AUT	NED	ITA	CAN	USA		11**	9th
1980	Marlboro Team McLaren	M29B; M29C	Ford Cosworth DFV	G	John Watson	Ret	11	11	4	NC	DNQ	7	8	Ret	Ret	Ret	Ret	4	NC		11**	9th
1980	Marlboro Team McLaren	M29B; M29C	Ford Cosworth DFV	G	Alain Prost	6	5	DNS		Ret	Ret	Ret	6	11	7						11**	9th
1980	Marlboro Team McLaren	M29B; M29C	Ford Cosworth DFV	G	Stephen South				DNQ												11**	9th
1981	Marlboro McLaren International	M29F	Ford Cosworth DFV	G		USW	BRA	ARG	SMR	BEL	MON	ESP	FRA	GBR	GER	AUT	NED	ITA	CAN	CPL	28***	6th
1981	Marlboro McLaren International	M29F	Ford Cosworth DFV	G	John Watson	Ret	8														28***	6th
1981	Marlboro McLaren International	M29F	Ford Cosworth DFV	G	Andrea de Cesaris	Ret	Ret	11	6	Ret											28***	6th

* 8 points in 1979 scored using the McLaren M28
** 1 point in 1980 scored using the McLaren M30
*** 27 points in 1981 scored using the McLaren MP4/1
