= McLaren M30 =

Formula One racing car

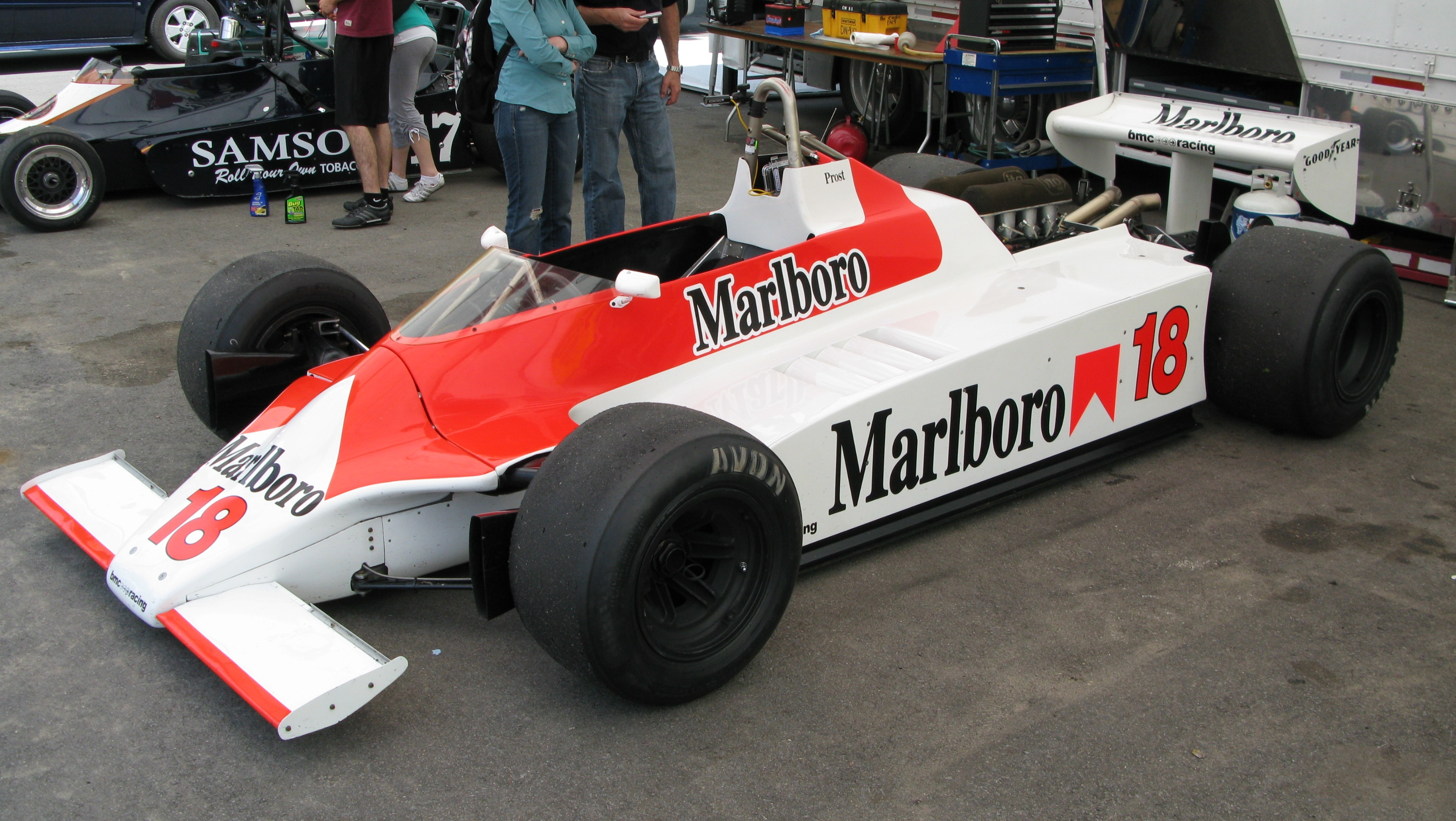
- Category: Formula One
- Constructor: McLaren
- Designer: Gordon Coppuck
- Predecessor: McLaren M29
- Successor: McLaren MP4/1

Technical specifications
- Chassis: Aluminium monocoque
- Engine: Ford-Cosworth DFV, 2993cc V8, naturally aspirated, mid-engined, longitudinally mounted
- Transmission: McLaren / Hewland FG 400 5-speed manual

Competition history
- Notable entrants: Marlboro Team McLaren
- Notable drivers: 8. (France) Alain Prost
- Debut: 1980 Dutch Grand Prix
Races	Wins	Poles	F/Laps
4	0	0	0

The McLaren M30 is a Formula One racing car built and run by McLaren for part of the 1980 Formula One season. It was a one-off car, primarily driven by Alain Prost. The purpose of the M30 was to further capitalize on ground-effect design, taking over from the McLaren M29 which was perceived as obsolete.

The one and only M30 was damaged in an accident in practice for the 1980 United States Grand Prix. For the 1981 season McLaren returned to the M29 model. The McLaren M30 was the last new car completed by McLaren before the team's merger with Ron Dennis's Project 4 Formula 2 team, and he assumed leadership of the team the following year.

Years after its use by McLaren, it was sold to Tony Dunne, who repaired the crash damaged car. Irish driver Alo Lawler used the car to compete in UK domestic Formule Libre championships between 1984 and 1989, and it was then sold to George Nuse who raced it in historic series in the USA.

Since 2004, Sean Allen has competitively raced the McLaren M30 in North America in the Historic Grand Prix.

== Complete Formula One results ==
(key)

Year	Entrant	Engine	Tyres	Drivers	Grands Prix														Points	WCC
Year	Entrant	Engine	Tyres	Drivers	ARG	BRA	RSA	USW	BEL	MON	FRA	GBR	GER	AUT	NED	ITA	CAN	USA	Points	WCC
1980	Marlboro Team McLaren	Ford Cosworth DFV 3.0 V8	G	Alain Prost											6	7	Ret	DNS	11*	7th

* Only 1 point scored using the M30, remainder scored with M29 models.
