= 1980 Formula One season =

34th season of FIA Formula One motor racing

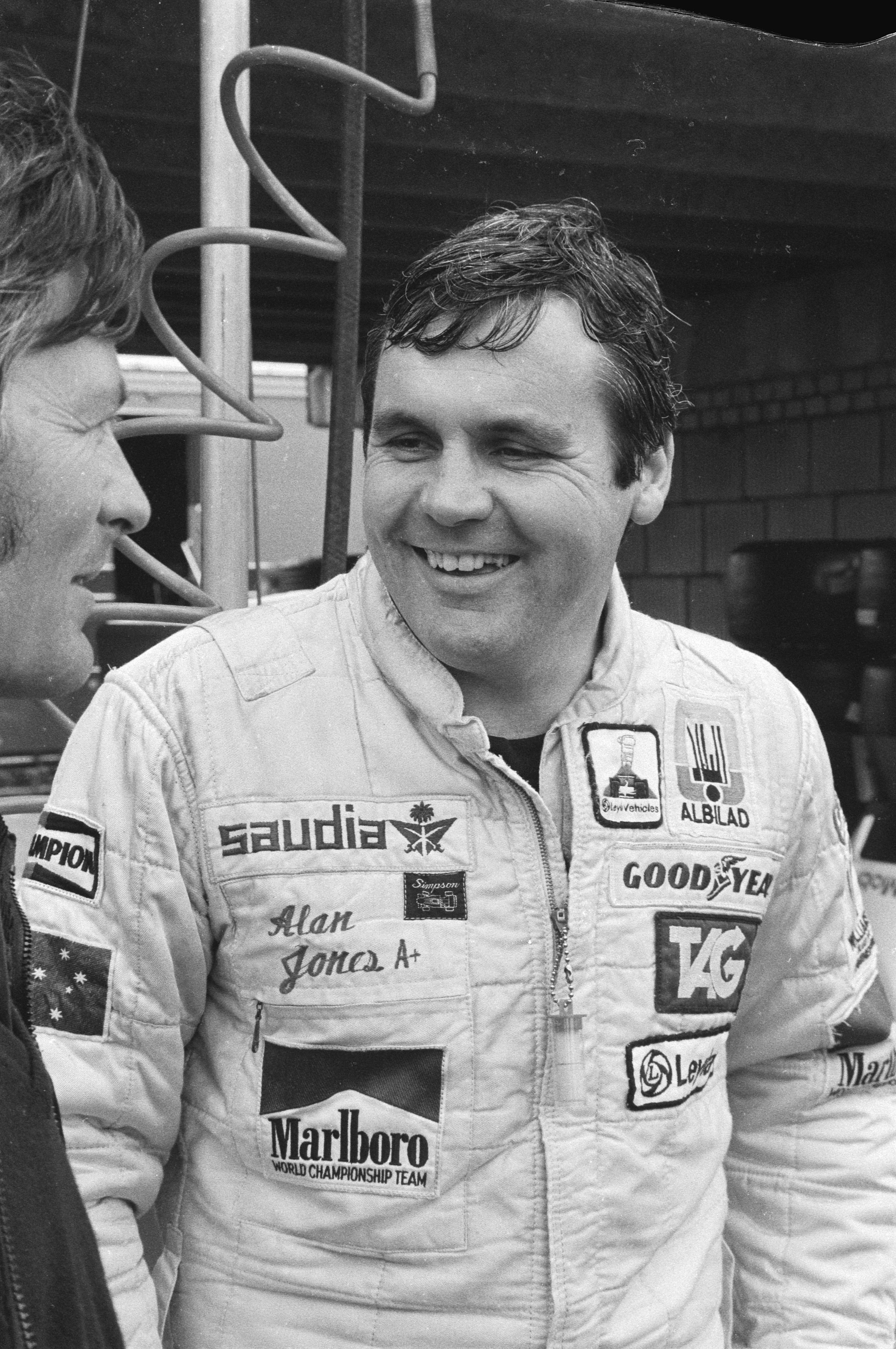
Australian driver Alan Jones won the Drivers' Championship, driving for the Williams team.

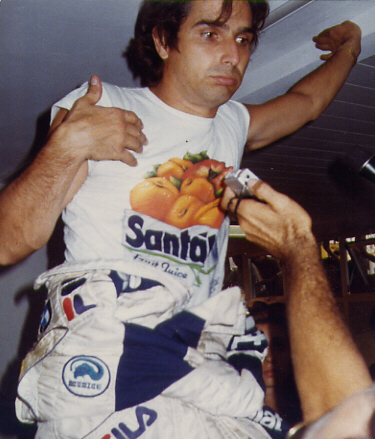
Brazilian Nelson Piquet, driving for Brabham, finished runner-up to Jones.

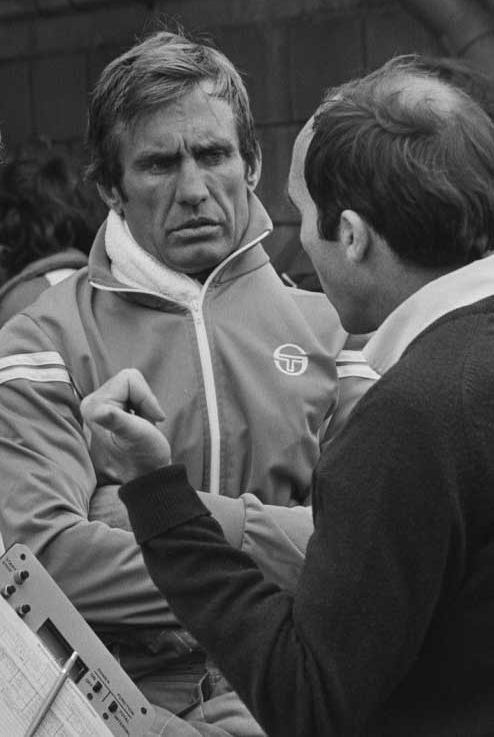
Jones' Williams teammate, Argentine Carlos Reutemann, placed third.

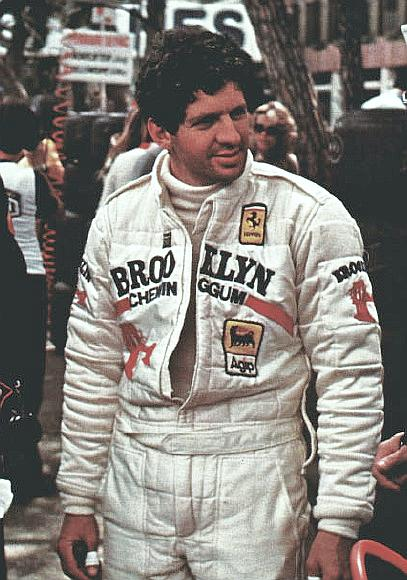
Reigning champion Jody Scheckter of Ferrari had a terrible title defence with only two points. He retired at the end of the season.

The 1980 Formula One season was the 34th season of FIA Formula One motor racing. It featured the 1980 World Championship of Drivers and the 1980 International Cup for F1 Constructors, which were contested concurrently from 13 January to 5 October over a fourteen-race series. The season also included one non-championship race, the Spanish Grand Prix.

Alan Jones, driving a Williams-Ford, became the first Australian to win the World Championship since Jack Brabham in 1966. The season saw a major change of guard in Formula One with the Williams team's first Drivers' and Constructors' titles, the emergence of Nelson Piquet as a championship contender and the debut of future World Champions Alain Prost and Nigel Mansell, while reigning champions Jody Scheckter and Ferrari suffered a terrible season that resulted in Scheckter retiring from the sport at the end of the year. In addition, Frenchman Patrick Depailler lost his life while testing at Hockenheim.

== Drivers and constructors ==
The following drivers and constructors contested the 1980 World Championship of Drivers and the 1980 International Cup for F1 Constructors.

Entrant	Constructor	Chassis	Engine	Tyres	No	Driver	Rounds
(Italy) SEFAC Ferrari	Ferrari	312T5	Ferrari 015 3.0 F12	M	1	(South Africa) Jody Scheckter	All
(Italy) SEFAC Ferrari	Ferrari	312T5	Ferrari 015 3.0 F12	M	2	(Canada) Gilles Villeneuve	All
(Italy) SEFAC Ferrari	Ferrari	126C	Ferrari 021 1.5 V6 t	M	2	(Canada) Gilles Villeneuve	12
(United Kingdom) Candy Tyrrell Team	Tyrrell-Ford	009	Ford Cosworth DFV 3.0 V8	G	3	(France) Jean-Pierre Jarier	1–2
(United Kingdom) Candy Tyrrell Team	Tyrrell-Ford	009	Ford Cosworth DFV 3.0 V8	G	4	(Republic of Ireland) Derek Daly	1–2
(United Kingdom) Candy Tyrrell Team	Tyrrell-Ford	010	Ford Cosworth DFV 3.0 V8	G	3	(France) Jean-Pierre Jarier	3–14
(United Kingdom) Candy Tyrrell Team	Tyrrell-Ford	010	Ford Cosworth DFV 3.0 V8	G	4	(Republic of Ireland) Derek Daly	3–14
(United Kingdom) Candy Tyrrell Team	Tyrrell-Ford	010	Ford Cosworth DFV 3.0 V8	G	43	(New Zealand) Mike Thackwell	13–14
(United Kingdom) Parmalat Racing	Brabham-Ford	BT49	Ford Cosworth DFV 3.0 V8	G	5	(Brazil) Nelson Piquet	All
(United Kingdom) Parmalat Racing	Brabham-Ford	BT49	Ford Cosworth DFV 3.0 V8	G	6	(Argentina) Ricardo Zunino	1–7
(United Kingdom) Parmalat Racing	Brabham-Ford	BT49	Ford Cosworth DFV 3.0 V8	G	6	(Mexico) Héctor Rebaque	8–14
(United Kingdom) Marlboro Team McLaren	McLaren-Ford	M29B	Ford Cosworth DFV 3.0 V8	G	7	(United Kingdom) John Watson	1–3
(United Kingdom) Marlboro Team McLaren	McLaren-Ford	M29B	Ford Cosworth DFV 3.0 V8	G	8	(France) Alain Prost	1–3
(United Kingdom) Marlboro Team McLaren	McLaren-Ford	M29C	Ford Cosworth DFV 3.0 V8	G	7	(United Kingdom) John Watson	4–14
(United Kingdom) Marlboro Team McLaren	McLaren-Ford	M29C	Ford Cosworth DFV 3.0 V8	G	8	(United Kingdom) Stephen South	4
(United Kingdom) Marlboro Team McLaren	McLaren-Ford	M29C	Ford Cosworth DFV 3.0 V8	G	8	(France) Alain Prost	5–10
(United Kingdom) Marlboro Team McLaren	McLaren-Ford	M30	Ford Cosworth DFV 3.0 V8	G	8	(France) Alain Prost	11–14
(West Germany) Team ATS	ATS-Ford	D3	Ford Cosworth DFV 3.0 V8	G	9	(Switzerland) Marc Surer	1–2
(West Germany) Team ATS	ATS-Ford	D3	Ford Cosworth DFV 3.0 V8	G	10	(Netherlands) Jan Lammers	1–3
(West Germany) Team ATS	ATS-Ford	D4	Ford Cosworth DFV 3.0 V8	G			
(West Germany) Team ATS	ATS-Ford	D4	Ford Cosworth DFV 3.0 V8	G	9	(Switzerland) Marc Surer	3, 7–14
(West Germany) Team ATS	ATS-Ford	D4	Ford Cosworth DFV 3.0 V8	G	9	(Netherlands) Jan Lammers	4–6
(West Germany) Team ATS	ATS-Ford	D4	Ford Cosworth DFV 3.0 V8	G	10	(Austria) Harald Ertl	9
(United Kingdom) Team Essex Lotus	Lotus-Ford	81; 81B	Ford Cosworth DFV 3.0 V8	G	11	(United States) Mario Andretti	All
(United Kingdom) Team Essex Lotus	Lotus-Ford	81; 81B	Ford Cosworth DFV 3.0 V8	G	12	(Italy) Elio de Angelis	All
(United Kingdom) Team Essex Lotus	Lotus-Ford	81; 81B	Ford Cosworth DFV 3.0 V8	G	43	(United Kingdom) Nigel Mansell	10–12
(United Kingdom) Unipart Racing Team	Ensign-Ford	N180	Ford Cosworth DFV 3.0 V8	G	14	(Switzerland) Clay Regazzoni	1–4
(United Kingdom) Unipart Racing Team	Ensign-Ford	N180	Ford Cosworth DFV 3.0 V8	G	14	(United Kingdom) Tiff Needell	5–6
(United Kingdom) Unipart Racing Team	Ensign-Ford	N180	Ford Cosworth DFV 3.0 V8	G	14	(Netherlands) Jan Lammers	7–14
(United Kingdom) Unipart Racing Team	Ensign-Ford	N180	Ford Cosworth DFV 3.0 V8	G	41	(United Kingdom) Geoff Lees	11–12
(France) Équipe Renault Elf	Renault	RE20	Renault-Gordini EF1 1.5 V6 t	M	15	(France) Jean-Pierre Jabouille	1–13
(France) Équipe Renault Elf	Renault	RE20	Renault-Gordini EF1 1.5 V6 t	M	16	(France) René Arnoux	All
(United Kingdom) Shadow Cars (United Kingdom) Theodore Shadow	Shadow-Ford	DN11; DN12	Ford Cosworth DFV 3.0 V8	G	17	(Sweden) Stefan Johansson	1–2
(United Kingdom) Shadow Cars (United Kingdom) Theodore Shadow	Shadow-Ford	DN11; DN12	Ford Cosworth DFV 3.0 V8	G	17	(United Kingdom) Geoff Lees	3–7
(United Kingdom) Shadow Cars (United Kingdom) Theodore Shadow	Shadow-Ford	DN11; DN12	Ford Cosworth DFV 3.0 V8	G	18	(Republic of Ireland) David Kennedy	1–7
(Brazil) Skol Fittipaldi Team	Fittipaldi-Ford	F7; F8	Ford Cosworth DFV 3.0 V8	G	20	(Brazil) Emerson Fittipaldi	All
(Brazil) Skol Fittipaldi Team	Fittipaldi-Ford	F7; F8	Ford Cosworth DFV 3.0 V8	G	21	(Finland) Keke Rosberg	All
(Italy) Marlboro Team Alfa Romeo	Alfa Romeo	179	Alfa Romeo 1260 3.0 V12	G	22	(France) Patrick Depailler	1–8
(Italy) Marlboro Team Alfa Romeo	Alfa Romeo	179	Alfa Romeo 1260 3.0 V12	G	22	(Italy) Vittorio Brambilla	11–12
(Italy) Marlboro Team Alfa Romeo	Alfa Romeo	179	Alfa Romeo 1260 3.0 V12	G	22	(Italy) Andrea de Cesaris	13–14
(Italy) Marlboro Team Alfa Romeo	Alfa Romeo	179	Alfa Romeo 1260 3.0 V12	G	23	(Italy) Bruno Giacomelli	All
(France) Équipe Ligier Gitanes	Ligier-Ford	JS11/15	Ford Cosworth DFV 3.0 V8	G	25	(France) Didier Pironi	All
(France) Équipe Ligier Gitanes	Ligier-Ford	JS11/15	Ford Cosworth DFV 3.0 V8	G	26	(France) Jacques Laffite	All
(United Kingdom) Albilad Williams Racing Team	Williams-Ford	FW07	Ford Cosworth DFV 3.0 V8	G	27	(Australia) Alan Jones	1
(United Kingdom) Albilad Williams Racing Team	Williams-Ford	FW07B	Ford Cosworth DFV 3.0 V8	G	27	(Australia) Alan Jones	2–14
(United Kingdom) Albilad Williams Racing Team	Williams-Ford	FW07B	Ford Cosworth DFV 3.0 V8	G	28	(Argentina) Carlos Reutemann	All
(United Kingdom) Warsteiner Arrows Racing Team (United Kingdom) Warsteiner Arrows Racing with Penthouse Rizla+.	Arrows-Ford	A3	Ford Cosworth DFV 3.0 V8	G	29	(Italy) Riccardo Patrese	All
(United Kingdom) Warsteiner Arrows Racing Team (United Kingdom) Warsteiner Arrows Racing with Penthouse Rizla+.	Arrows-Ford	A3	Ford Cosworth DFV 3.0 V8	G	30	(West Germany) Jochen Mass	1–10, 13–14
(United Kingdom) Warsteiner Arrows Racing Team (United Kingdom) Warsteiner Arrows Racing with Penthouse Rizla+.	Arrows-Ford	A3	Ford Cosworth DFV 3.0 V8	G	30	(New Zealand) Mike Thackwell	11
(United Kingdom) Warsteiner Arrows Racing Team (United Kingdom) Warsteiner Arrows Racing with Penthouse Rizla+.	Arrows-Ford	A3	Ford Cosworth DFV 3.0 V8	G	30	(West Germany) Manfred Winkelhock	12
(Italy) Osella Racing Team	Osella-Ford	FA1; FA1B	Ford Cosworth DFV 3.0 V8	G	31	(United States) Eddie Cheever	All
(United Kingdom) Brands Hatch Racing	Williams-Ford	FW07	Ford Cosworth DFV 3.0 V8	G	43	(South Africa) Desiré Wilson	8
(United Kingdom) RAM – Penthouse Rizla+. Racing (United Kingdom) RAM – Rainbow Jeans/Theodore Racing (United Kingdom) RAM – Williams Grand Prix Engineering	Williams-Ford	FW07	Ford Cosworth DFV 3.0 V8	G	50	(United Kingdom) Rupert Keegan	8–14
(United Kingdom) RAM – Penthouse Rizla+. Racing (United Kingdom) RAM – Rainbow Jeans/Theodore Racing (United Kingdom) RAM – Williams Grand Prix Engineering	Williams-Ford	FW07	Ford Cosworth DFV 3.0 V8	G	51	(United States) Kevin Cogan	13
(United Kingdom) RAM – Penthouse Rizla+. Racing (United Kingdom) RAM – Rainbow Jeans/Theodore Racing (United Kingdom) RAM – Williams Grand Prix Engineering	Williams-Ford	FW07	Ford Cosworth DFV 3.0 V8	G	51	(United Kingdom) Geoff Lees	14

=== Team and driver changes ===
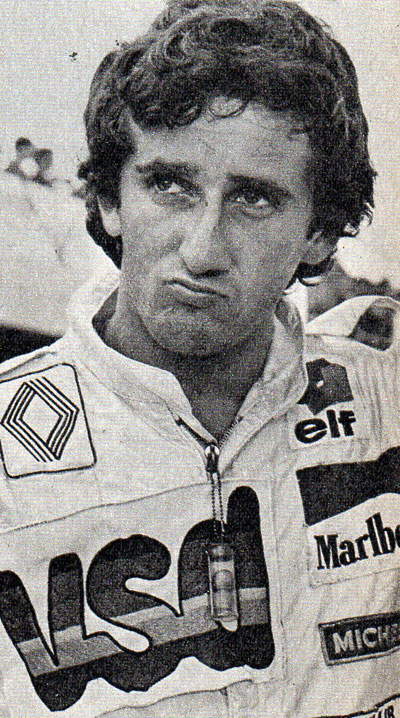
Alain Prost (pictured in 1981) made his debut for McLaren.

- Arturo Merzario and Héctor Rebaque had participated in the 1979 season, building their own chassis and driving themselves. However, both had closed down their F1 operations at the end of the year.
- Osella had been close to winning the 1979 European Formula Two Championship with driver Eddie Cheever. After securing the sponsorship of the Italian Tobacco Organization, they entered Formula 1 in 1980, taking Cheever with them. The American previously drove for Theodore and Hesketh in 1978.
- Williams signed Carlos Reutemann. The Argentinian had finished third in the championship in 1975 as well as 1978, but had suffered a difficult 1979 season with Lotus. Ex-Williams driver Clay Regazzoni rejoined Ensign Racing, having driven for them in 1977, after Marc Surer had moved to ATS.
- ATS also signed Jan Lammers, coming from the slowly dissipating Shadow team. Lammers' 1979 teammate Elio de Angelis moved to Lotus after Reutemann had left. For 1980, Shadow signed David Kennedy, runner-up in the 1979 British Formula One Championship, and Stefan Johansson, while he was still just a British F3 driver.
- Jacky Ickx had retired at the end of 1979, his Ligier seat taken up by Didier Pironi.
- 1979 European F3 champion Alain Prost made his F1 debut with McLaren. He replaced Patrick Tambay, who went on to become the 1980 Can-Am champion with Haas Lola.
- Fittipaldi signed future champion Keke Rosberg after buying the remains of the Wolf team at the end of last season.
- Whilst still recovering from a hang gliding accident, Patrick Depailler joined Alfa Romeo, taking the place of Vittorio Brambilla.

==== Mid-season changes ====
- Marc Surer crashed while qualifying at Kyalami, injuring both his legs. ATS had just reduced their operations from two to one car and parted with Jan Lammers, but the Dutchman rejoined for three more races, while Surer recovered.
- Clay Regazzoni was paralysed from the waist down when he lost his brakes at Long Beach, slamming into a parked car and a concrete barrier. Tiff Needell, Jan Lammers and Geoff Lees would take over the seat, in that order. Lees had already driven for Shadow earlier that year, after Stefan Johansson failed to qualify for his first two races and his debut was deemed preliminary.
- Half way through the season, the Shadow operation was taken over by Theodore Racing. Theodore would enter the 1981 season with their own first chassis.
- RAM Racing entered the British Grand Prix with a 1979-spec Williams FW07, driven by Rupert Keegan. They stayed for the rest of the season, even entering a second car for the final two races. (RAM had been involved in F1 since 1976, but it would take until 1983 before they entered a full season entry and built their own chassis.)
- Héctor Rebaque returned to Formula 1, replacing Ricardo Zunino at Brabham from the British Grand Prix on.
- During a private testing session at Hockenheim, Alfa Romeo driver Patrick Depailler was killed in a crash. The team's 1979 driver Vittorio Brambilla returned for two races, before handing the drive over to debutant Andrea de Cesaris.
- Lotus test driver Nigel Mansell made his debut when Colin Chapman awarded him with three race starts, driving a development version of the Lotus 81. He would go on to be their full-season driver for 1981.
- Just over a year after winning his first race in Formula 3, Mike Thackwell was driving in Formula Two and, at the Dutch Grand Prix, was granted his first Formula 1 test by Ken Tyrrell. He made his racing debut at the Canadian Grand Prix, making him the youngest F1 driver up to then (although the race was red-flagged and he was asked to give his car to Tyrrell driver Jean-Pierre Jarier for the restart, so the record is arguable).

== Calendar ==
Round	Grand Prix	Circuit	Date
1	Argentine Grand Prix	(Argentina) Autódromo de Buenos Aires, Buenos Aires	13 January
2	Brazilian Grand Prix	(Brazil) Autodromo de Interlagos, São Paulo	27 January
3	South African Grand Prix	(South Africa) Kyalami Grand Prix Circuit, Midrand	1 March
4	United States Grand Prix West	(United States) Long Beach Street Circuit, California	30 March
5	Belgian Grand Prix	(Belgium) Circuit Zolder, Heusden-Zolder	4 May
6	Monaco Grand Prix	Circuit de Monaco, Monte Carlo	18 May
7	French Grand Prix	(France) Circuit Paul Ricard, Le Castellet	29 June
8	British Grand Prix	(United Kingdom) Brands Hatch, Kent	13 July
9	German Grand Prix	(West Germany) Hockenheimring, Hockenheim	10 August
10	Austrian Grand Prix	(Austria) Österreichring, Spielberg	17 August
11	Dutch Grand Prix	(Netherlands) Circuit Park Zandvoort, Zandvoort	31 August
12	Italian Grand Prix	(Italy) Autodromo Dino Ferrari, Imola	14 September
13	Canadian Grand Prix	(Canada) Île Notre-Dame Circuit, Montréal	28 September
14	United States Grand Prix	(United States) Watkins Glen Grand Prix Course, New York State	5 October

=== Calendar changes ===
- The Brazilian Grand Prix was originally supposed to return to Jacarepaguá, but parts of the track, originally built on a swamp, were beginning to sink into the soft ground, so the race was held at Autodromo de Interlagos, like the year before.
- The Spanish Grand Prix, held on 1 June, was to be a championship race but it had a FISA–FOCA war concerning ground-effect aerodynamics. As a result of the war, Ferrari, Renault and Alfa Romeo boycotted the event. It was announced before Friday practice that the race was not going to be held under FISA regulations and, therefore, would not count towards the championship. The race was won by Alan Jones.
- The French Grand Prix was moved from Dijon-Prenois to Circuit Paul Ricard, in keeping with the event-sharing arrangement between the two circuits. Likewise, the British Grand Prix was moved from Silverstone to Brands Hatch.
- The Italian Grand Prix was moved from the Autodromo Nazionale di Monza to the Autodromo Dino Ferrari while Monza underwent major upgrades, including a new pit building.

==== Provisional calendar ====
Originally, 1980 was to be an eighteen-race championship, but three Grands Prix were cancelled before the season began:

- The Mexican Grand Prix was scheduled to be held on 13 April, but the Autódromo Hermanos Rodríguez circuit was not renovated in time.
- The Swedish Grand Prix was originally scheduled to be held on 14 June at Anderstorp Raceway, but was cancelled on 19 November 1979. With enthusiasm for Formula One in Sweden falling as a result of the deaths of Swedish drivers Ronnie Peterson and Gunnar Nilsson, financial support for the event was not secured in time. There was never another Swedish Grand Prix.
- The Caesars Palace Grand Prix was originally supposed to be held on 2 November, but the race was cancelled. It would go through in 1981.

== Season report ==
=== Round 1: Argentina ===
The 1980 Formula One season started in Argentina in January, at the Buenos Aires Municipal Autodrome. After Friday's practice, due to the heat and the suction the ground-effect cars were creating, the track began to break up, and the drivers found conditions difficult and dangerous. Led by Emerson Fittipaldi, the drivers staged a semi-unsuccessful protest – the organizers fixed the track, but not successfully – and on race day, the track remained in subpar condition. The race went ahead anyway, and many drivers were caught-out by the disintegration of the twisty arena infield section of the No.15 variant of the racing facility. After going off twice and dropping back to 4th after making a pit-stop to clean grass out of his car's radiators, Australian and title favorite Alan Jones took victory in his Williams-Ford/Cosworth. Brazilian Nelson Piquet, who also went off a few times, finished 2nd, and Finn Keke Rosberg scored 3rd in his Fittipaldi. French rookie Alain Prost, in his first ever F1 race, finished 6th and scored his first ever World Championship point. Gilles Villeneuve, competitive throughout in his Ferrari, crashed heavily at the Toboggan left-right sequence of corners after his front suspension failed after possible damage caused to it after a number of off-track excursions the Canadian had during the race.

=== Round 2: Brazil ===
The other half of the South American January tour took place in Brazil. This meeting was also met with pre-race difficulties. The safety conditions of the 5-mile Interlagos circuit located in São Paulo had been heavily protested by the drivers for some time, led by South African Ferrari driver Jody Scheckter. The original arrangement was that this Grand Prix was supposed to be held at the Jacarepaguá circuit in Rio de Janeiro, and then the drivers would return to Interlagos for 1981 after it would go through a complete resurfacing; but the Jacarepaguá circuit had problems with the tarmac sinking into the ground, so the only option was to return to São Paulo. The drivers protested that the Interlagos track's surface was so bad that it was dangerous to race on. The barriers and catch-fence arrangements were not deemed adequate enough to protect the cars from the embankments and uneven surface of the limited run-off areas there, even though the track was wide in most places. The race went ahead anyway, and the Renault of Frenchman Jean-Pierre Jabouille took pole and led for 25 of 40 laps. The Renault cars proved to be dominant at Interlagos, which was 2,840 ft (850 m) above sea level, giving the turbocharged Renault engines a horsepower advantage. Jabouille retired with turbo failure and his teammate René Arnoux took the lead and won, followed by Italian driver Elio de Angelis in a Lotus and Jones in his Williams.

=== Round 3: South Africa ===
The F1 teams arrived in South Africa in March, at the fast Kyalami circuit between Johannesburg and Pretoria in the midst of an African summer. Alain Prost crashed his McLaren at the Esses and broke his wrist; he would miss this and the next race in Long Beach; while Marc Surer crashed heavily at Crowthorne and broke his leg; he missed the next 3 races. Like Interlagos before, the higher altitude of Kyalami helped the Renault cars which dominated the race. Jabouille led for a while and retired, and Arnoux took the lead from 2nd place and won the race. This race effectively brought the FISA–FOCA war into the spotlight; FISA, the governing body of international motorsports (and the organization that the 3 big constructors – Renault, Ferrari and Alfa Romeo – were aligned to) led by Jean-Marie Balestre, argued that the ground effect cars of the time were too fast through corners, and FOCA (Formula One Constructors' Association, representing the mostly British independent constructors) led by Bernie Ecclestone and Max Mosley, argued that the superior road-holding of the independent teams' cars equalized their cars to the power advantages that particularly the Renaults had.

=== Round 4: United States West ===
A stop-over in Long Beach, California right next to the Industrial landscape of Los Angeles happened 4 weeks after the South African race. The hot weather gave for a heated atmosphere at the first street circuit (1 of 2 on the calendar – the other being Monaco) which was in contrast to the previous 3 quick Southern Hemisphere circuits used thus far in the season. With its tight, slow layout being lined with concrete walls, Long Beach was known then to be the most punishing race of the season on the car and driver. Nelson Piquet won every award to win this race in his Brabham-Ford/Cosworth – he took pole, set fastest lap, led from start to finish and took his first of 23 race victories. The race itself saw multiple accidents – there was a pile-up at the Le Gasomet hairpin caused by Alfa Romeo driver Bruno Giacomelli, and the 40-year-old Swiss Clay Regazzoni crashed at the end of the long, flat-out Shoreline Drive when the brakes on his Ensign failed and he collided head on at 180 mph into Ricardo Zunino's parked Brabham, then through some tires and into a concrete wall. The Swiss was critically injured, but survived; he would be paralyzed from the waist down for the rest of his life.

=== Round 5: Belgium ===
The cancellation of the Mexican Grand Prix, supposed to have taken place 2 weeks after Long Beach, created a 5-week gap between Long Beach and the Belgian Grand Prix. The F1 circus started its 4-month long European tour at Zolder, where Frenchman Didier Pironi took his first career victory in his Ligier-Ford/Cosworth ahead of Alan Jones and his Argentine teammate Carlos Reutemann.

=== Round 6: Monaco ===
The street race in Monaco began with a pile-up at the start, where Derek Daly went flying twice over a number of cars at the first corner. He took out Prost in the McLaren, his teammate Jean-Pierre Jarier and Bruno Giacomelli in an Alfa Romeo. Didier Pironi led and crashed, and Carlos Reutemann took the lead and won from Frenchman Jacques Laffite in a Ligier-Ford/Cosworth and Piquet in a Brabham.

=== Non-championship race: Spain ===
The Spanish Grand Prix at the Jarama circuit near Madrid ended up losing its championship status after Jean-Marie Balestre announced on morning of Friday's practice (in an attempt to put FOCA in their place after drivers driving for FOCA-aligned teams did not show up to drivers' meetings at the previous 2 Grands Prix) that the 1980 Spanish GP would not count as a championship round. Balestre also stripped the drivers of their racing licenses. The FISA-supported manufacturer teams – Renault, Ferrari, and Alfa – all pulled out, and the FOCA-supported independent constructors stayed to race. The race was won by Alan Jones, who had also taken pole.

=== Round 7: France ===
The abrupt non-championship status of the Spanish Grand Prix and the cancellation of the Swedish Grand Prix at the Anderstorp circuit meant there was a 6-week gap between the Monaco and French Grands Prix. The French Grand Prix took place while the situation around the Spanish Grand Prix was continuing 4 weeks afterwards. With their racing licenses given back to them, the drivers got on with the racing, and at the Paul Ricard circuit on the southern French riviera near Marseille, Williams driver Jones beat the Ligiers of Jacques Laffite and Didier Pironi on home soil. Jones won the race by 4.52 seconds from Pironi after he had been held up by teammate Laffite for a number of laps.

=== Round 8: Great Britain ===
The British Grand Prix in 1980 was at Brands Hatch, just outside London. This race on the southern English circuit saw the Ligiers of Pironi and Laffite lead and fall out; Pironi retired after a puncture, and Laffite crashed at Hawthorn's. Alan Jones took advantage of the Ligier's problems and managed to hold off Nelson Piquet to win again in a Williams, the English team's second consecutive British GP win.

=== Round 9: West Germany ===
The German Grand Prix at the Hockenheimring was marred by the fatal pre-race testing accident of Patrick Depailler at the flat out Ost-Kurve 9 days before the race. Suspension failure on his Alfa Romeo caused him to crash massively after his car overturned and vaulted the barriers, causing fatal head injuries. Alan Jones took pole from Renault driver Jabouille by mere hundredths of a second, and he led the race until he had to come in with a puncture on the straight before the stadium. Laffite and Reutemann passed Jones, who finished 3rd. Laffite went on to win for Ligier, followed by the Williams duo of Reutemann and Jones.

=== Round 10: Austria ===
The fastest circuit of the season, the Österreichring in the Styrian mountains, enabled Jabouille to win by seconds from Alan Jones. Renault driver Jabouille, who had retired from every race he had participated in so far in the season, finished this race. His development work with Renault over the past 4 seasons gave him his 2nd and last F1 victory of his career.

=== Round 11: The Netherlands ===
The beach-side Zandvoort circuit near Amsterdam, modified from the previous year, saw Brazilian Nelson Piquet win from Frenchmen Arnoux and Laffite. The Renaults dominated qualifying, although Jabouille retired, and Jones went out after accident damage.

=== Round 12: Italy ===
The European tour concluded with the Italian Grand Prix being held at the Autodromo Dino Ferrari near the town of Imola, rather than Monza. The Dino Ferrari circuit, located near the Ferrari factory and just outside Bologna, had signed a deal to alternate the Italian GP with Monza, on the condition that Monza improve its track safety and facilities. Although the Monza track owners had already made safety upgrades a year before, the deal had been signed before Monza made changes; so for the first time since 1948 (and for the only time during the World Championship era), the Italian GP was not held at Monza. The Renaults dominated qualifying at this fast Italian circuit, although they fell out with mechanical problems; and Piquet won again and overtook Jones in the championship, who finished 2nd in front of his teammate Carlos Reutemann.

=== Round 13: Canada ===
The final leg of the 1980 Formula One season was a 2-part tour in North America, starting in Canada, at the Ile-Notre Dame circuit in Montreal. This race had to be restarted after a multiple pile-up involving Piquet and Jones at the start, when Jones shut the door at the very first corner after the start. Piquet jumped into the spare car, which had a short-lasting qualifying Ford/Cosworth engine in it which blew up early on, and Jones won the race, which effectively gave the Australian his only ever Formula One Drivers' Championship, and Williams's first ever Constructors' Championship. Jabouille crashed head on into a tire-wall and broke both of his legs.

=== Round 14: United States East ===
The other half of the North American visit and the last round of the 1980 Formula One season was the second round in the United States at the Watkins Glen circuit in New York State, four hours from New York City and 5 hours from Montreal. This race had been in doubt for almost the whole season, but went ahead after a loan was given by FOCA to the organizers. French rookie Alain Prost crashed heavily on Saturday morning practice due to suspension failure at the very fast left-handed Turn 10, the second-to-last corner on the track. Prost received a concussion after hitting his head on his car's steering wheel; he had to miss the race but was at the circuit on race day; he felt he could not trust the car's mechanical strength after a season's worth of component failures on his car, which often led to accidents; this happened to Prost a week earlier in Montreal.

Bruno Giacomelli took pole in his Alfa, the first time an Alfa Romeo had been on pole since 1951. Giacomelli led for most of the race up until Lap 32, when the electrics in his Alfa failed in the Boot section of the course. Jones went off at the first corner at the start and dropped to 16th; he raced through and took 2nd from his Argentine teammate Carlos Reutemann, and then inherited the lead from Giacomelli after the Italian retired. Jones won his 5th race of the year (6 if Spain is counted) ahead of Reutemann and Didier Pironi in a Ligier. 1978 champion Mario Andretti scored his only point of the 1980 season at Watkins Glen, close to his adoptive town in Nazareth, Pennsylvania.

This would be the last championship Formula One race at the Watkins Glen circuit. The corporation running the circuit was in debt, and went bankrupt after it could not meet Bernie Ecclestone and FOCA's increased demands, and the circuit was struck from the 1981 season calendar in May of that year. Although there were other Grands Prix that would be run in the United States during the 1980s aside from Long Beach, the United States Grand Prix would not be run again until 1989 on a street circuit in Phoenix, Arizona.

A third American race, the Caesars Palace Grand Prix in Las Vegas, was supposed to be the final event of the season 4 weeks after Watkins Glen, but this event was cancelled.

== Results and standings ==
=== Grands Prix ===
Round	Grand Prix	Pole position	Fastest lap	Winning driver	Winning constructor	Report
1	(Argentina) Argentine Grand Prix	(Australia) Alan Jones	(Australia) Alan Jones	(Australia) Alan Jones	(United Kingdom) Williams-Ford	Report
2	(Brazil) Brazilian Grand Prix	(France) Jean-Pierre Jabouille	(France) René Arnoux	(France) René Arnoux	(France) Renault	Report
3	(South Africa) South African Grand Prix	(France) Jean-Pierre Jabouille	(France) René Arnoux	(France) René Arnoux	(France) Renault	Report
4	United States Grand Prix West	(Brazil) Nelson Piquet	(Brazil) Nelson Piquet	(Brazil) Nelson Piquet	(United Kingdom) Brabham-Ford	Report
5	(Belgium) Belgian Grand Prix	(Australia) Alan Jones	(France) Jacques Laffite	(France) Didier Pironi	(France) Ligier-Ford	Report
6	Monaco Grand Prix	(France) Didier Pironi	(Argentina) Carlos Reutemann	(Argentina) Carlos Reutemann	(United Kingdom) Williams-Ford	Report
7	(France) French Grand Prix	(France) Jacques Laffite	(Australia) Alan Jones	(Australia) Alan Jones	(United Kingdom) Williams-Ford	Report
8	(United Kingdom) British Grand Prix	(France) Didier Pironi	(France) Didier Pironi	(Australia) Alan Jones	(United Kingdom) Williams-Ford	Report
9	(West Germany) German Grand Prix	(Australia) Alan Jones	(Australia) Alan Jones	(France) Jacques Laffite	(France) Ligier-Ford	Report
10	(Austria) Austrian Grand Prix	(France) René Arnoux	(France) René Arnoux	(France) Jean-Pierre Jabouille	(France) Renault	Report
11	(Netherlands) Dutch Grand Prix	(France) René Arnoux	(France) René Arnoux	(Brazil) Nelson Piquet	(United Kingdom) Brabham-Ford	Report
12	(Italy) Italian Grand Prix	(France) René Arnoux	(Australia) Alan Jones	(Brazil) Nelson Piquet	(United Kingdom) Brabham-Ford	Report
13	(Canada) Canadian Grand Prix	(Brazil) Nelson Piquet	(France) Didier Pironi	(Australia) Alan Jones (Note: Didier Pironi originally won the race, but later received a one-minute time penalty for jump start. Alan Jones, initially classified second, inherited the win.)	(United Kingdom) Williams-Ford	Report
14	United States Grand Prix	(Italy) Bruno Giacomelli	(Australia) Alan Jones	(Australia) Alan Jones	(United Kingdom) Williams-Ford	Report

=== Scoring system ===
Points were awarded to the top six classified finishers. The International Cup for F1 Constructors counted the points of all drivers for a constructor. For the Championship, the best five results from rounds 1-7 and the best five results from rounds 8-14 were counted, while, for the Cup, all rounds were counted.

Numbers without parentheses are championship points; numbers in parentheses are total points scored. Points were awarded in the following system:

Position	1st	2nd	3rd	4th	5th	6th
Race	9	6	4	3	2	1

=== World Drivers' Championship standings ===
Pos	Driver	ARG (Argentina)	BRA (Brazil)	RSA (South Africa)	USW (United States)	BEL (Belgium)	MON (Monaco)	FRA (France)	GBR (United Kingdom)	GER (West Germany)	AUT (Austria)	NED (Netherlands)	ITA (Italy)	CAN (Canada)	USA (United States)	Points
1	(Australia) Alan Jones	1^{P}^{F}	3	Ret	Ret	2^{P}	Ret	1^{F}	1	(3)^{P}^{F}	2	11	2^{F}	1	1^{F}	67 (71)
2	(Brazil) Nelson Piquet	2	Ret	4	1^{P}^{F}	Ret	3	4	2	4	5	1	1	Ret^{P}	Ret	54
3	(Argentina) Carlos Reutemann	Ret	Ret	5	Ret	3	1^{F}	6	3	2	3	(4)	(3)	2	2	42 (49)
4	(France) Jacques Laffite	Ret	Ret	2	Ret	11^{F}	2	3^{P}	Ret	1	4	3	9	8	5	34
5	(France) Didier Pironi	Ret	4	3	6	1	Ret^{P}	2	Ret^{P}^{F}	Ret	Ret	Ret	6	3^{F}	3	32
6	(France) René Arnoux	Ret	1^{F}	1^{F}	9	4	Ret	5	NC	Ret	9^{P}^{F}	2^{P}^{F}	10^{P}	Ret	7	29
7	(Italy) Elio de Angelis	Ret	2	Ret	Ret	10	9	Ret	Ret	16	6	Ret	4	10	4	13
8	(France) Jean-Pierre Jabouille	Ret	Ret^{P}	Ret^{P}	10	Ret	Ret	Ret	Ret	Ret	1	Ret	Ret	Ret		9
9	(Italy) Riccardo Patrese	Ret	6	Ret	2	Ret	8	9	9	9	14	Ret	Ret	Ret	Ret	7
10	(Finland) Keke Rosberg	3	9	Ret	Ret	7	DNQ	Ret	DNQ	Ret	16	DNQ	5	9	10	6
11	(United Kingdom) John Watson	Ret	11	11	4	NC	DNQ	7	8	Ret	Ret	Ret	Ret	4	NC	6
12	(Republic of Ireland) Derek Daly	4	14	Ret	8	9	Ret	11	4	10	Ret	Ret	Ret	Ret	Ret	6
13	(France) Jean-Pierre Jarier	Ret	12	7	Ret	5	Ret	Ret	5	15	Ret	5	13	7	NC	6
14	(Canada) Gilles Villeneuve	Ret	16	Ret	Ret	6	5	8	Ret	6	8	7	Ret	5	Ret	6
15	(Brazil) Emerson Fittipaldi	NC	15	8	3	Ret	6	Ret	12	Ret	11	Ret	Ret	Ret	Ret	5
16	(France) Alain Prost	6	5	DNS		Ret	Ret	Ret	6	11	7	6	7	Ret	DNS	5
17	(West Germany) Jochen Mass	Ret	10	6	7	Ret	4	10	13	8	DNQ			11	Ret	4
18	(Italy) Bruno Giacomelli	5	13	Ret	Ret	Ret	Ret	Ret	Ret	5	Ret	Ret	Ret	Ret	Ret^{P}	4
19	(South Africa) Jody Scheckter	Ret	Ret	Ret	5	8	Ret	12	10	13	13	9	8	DNQ	11	2
20	(United States) Mario Andretti	Ret	Ret	12	Ret	Ret	7	Ret	Ret	7	Ret	8	Ret	Ret	6	1
21	(Mexico) Héctor Rebaque								7	Ret	10	Ret	Ret	6	Ret	1
—	(Switzerland) Marc Surer	Ret	7	DNS				Ret	Ret	12	12	10	Ret	DNQ	8	0
—	(Argentina) Ricardo Zunino	7	8	10	Ret	Ret	DNQ	Ret								0
—	(United Kingdom) Rupert Keegan								11	DNQ	15	DNQ	11	DNQ	9	0
—	(Switzerland) Clay Regazzoni	NC	Ret	9	Ret											0
—	(Netherlands) Jan Lammers	DNQ	DNQ	DNQ	Ret	12	NC	DNQ	DNQ	14	DNQ	DNQ	DNQ	12	Ret	0
—	(United States) Eddie Cheever	DNQ	DNQ	Ret	Ret	DNQ	DNQ	Ret	Ret	Ret	Ret	Ret	12	Ret	Ret	0
—	(United Kingdom) Geoff Lees			13	DNQ	DNQ	DNQ	DNQ				Ret	DNQ		DNQ	0
—	(France) Patrick Depailler	Ret	Ret	NC	Ret	Ret	Ret	Ret	Ret							0
—	(United Kingdom) Nigel Mansell										Ret	Ret	DNQ			0
—	(Italy) Vittorio Brambilla											Ret	Ret			0
—	(Italy) Andrea de Cesaris													Ret	Ret	0
—	(New Zealand) Mike Thackwell											DNQ		Ret	DNQ	0
—	(United Kingdom) Tiff Needell					Ret	DNQ									0
—	(Republic of Ireland) David Kennedy	DNQ	DNQ	DNQ	DNQ	DNQ	DNQ	DNQ								0
—	(Sweden) Stefan Johansson	DNQ	DNQ													0
—	(United Kingdom) Stephen South				DNQ											0
—	(South Africa) Desiré Wilson								DNQ							0
—	(Austria) Harald Ertl									DNQ						0
—	(Germany) Manfred Winkelhock												DNQ			0
—	(United States) Kevin Cogan													DNQ		0
Pos	Driver	ARG (Argentina)	BRA (Brazil)	RSA (South Africa)	USW (United States)	BEL (Belgium)	MON (Monaco)	FRA (France)	GBR (United Kingdom)	GER (West Germany)	AUT (Austria)	NED (Netherlands)	ITA (Italy)	CAN (Canada)	USA (United States)	Points

Key
Colour	Result
Gold	Winner
Silver	Second place
Bronze	Third place
Green	Other points position
Blue	Other classified position
Blue	Not classified, finished (NC)
Purple	Not classified, retired (Ret)
Red	Did not qualify (DNQ)
Black	Disqualified (DSQ)
White	Did not start (DNS)
White	Race cancelled (C)
Blank	Did not practice (DNP)
Blank	Excluded (EX)
Blank	Did not arrive (DNA)
Blank	Withdrawn (WD)
Blank	Did not enter (empty cell)
Annotation	Meaning
P	Pole position
F	Fastest lap

=== International Cup for F1 Constructors standings ===
Pos	Constructor	Car no.	ARG (Argentina)	BRA (Brazil)	RSA (South Africa)	USW (United States)	BEL (Belgium)	MON (Monaco)	FRA (France)	GBR (United Kingdom)	GER (West Germany)	AUT (Austria)	NED (Netherlands)	ITA (Italy)	CAN (Canada)	USA (United States)	Points
1	(United Kingdom) Williams-Ford	27	1^{P}^{F}	3	Ret	Ret	2^{P}	Ret	1^{F}	1	3^{P}^{F}	2	11	2^{F}	1	1^{F}	120
1	(United Kingdom) Williams-Ford	28	Ret	Ret	5	Ret	3	1^{F}	6	3	2	3	4	3	2	2	120
1	(United Kingdom) Williams-Ford	43								DNQ							120
1	(United Kingdom) Williams-Ford	50								11	DNQ	15	DNQ	11	DNQ	9	120
1	(United Kingdom) Williams-Ford	51													DNQ	DNQ	120
2	(France) Ligier-Ford	25	Ret	4	3	6	1	Ret^{P}	2	Ret^{P}^{F}	Ret	Ret	Ret	6	3^{F}	3	66
2	(France) Ligier-Ford	26	Ret	Ret	2	Ret	11^{F}	2	3^{P}	Ret	1	4	3	9	8	5	66
3	(United Kingdom) Brabham-Ford	5	2	Ret	4	1^{P}^{F}	Ret	3	4	2	4	5	1	1	Ret^{P}	Ret	55
3	(United Kingdom) Brabham-Ford	6	7	8	10	Ret	Ret	DNQ	Ret	7	Ret	10	Ret	Ret	6	Ret	55
4	(France) Renault	15	Ret	Ret^{P}	Ret^{P}	10	Ret	Ret	Ret	Ret	Ret	1	Ret	Ret	Ret		38
4	(France) Renault	16	Ret	1^{F}	1^{F}	9	4	Ret	5	NC	Ret	9^{P}^{F}	2^{P}^{F}	10^{P}	Ret	7	38
5	(United Kingdom) Lotus-Ford	11	Ret	Ret	12	Ret	Ret	7	Ret	Ret	7	Ret	8	Ret	Ret	6	14
5	(United Kingdom) Lotus-Ford	12	Ret	2	Ret	Ret	10	9	Ret	Ret	16	6	Ret	4	10	4	14
5	(United Kingdom) Lotus-Ford	43										Ret	Ret	DNQ			14
6	(United Kingdom) Tyrrell-Ford	3	Ret	12	7	Ret	5	Ret	Ret	5	15	Ret	5	13	7	NC	12
6	(United Kingdom) Tyrrell-Ford	4	4	14	Ret	8	9	Ret	11	4	10	Ret	Ret	Ret	Ret	Ret	12
6	(United Kingdom) Tyrrell-Ford	43													Ret	DNQ	12
7	(United Kingdom) Arrows-Ford	29	Ret	6	Ret	2	Ret	8	9	9	9	14	Ret	Ret	Ret	Ret	11
7	(United Kingdom) Arrows-Ford	30	Ret	10	6	7	Ret	4	10	13	8	DNQ	DNQ	DNQ	11	Ret	11
8	(Brazil) Fittipaldi-Ford	20	NC	15	8	3	Ret	6	Ret	12	Ret	11	Ret	Ret	Ret	Ret	11
8	(Brazil) Fittipaldi-Ford	21	3	9	Ret	Ret	7	DNQ	Ret	DNQ	Ret	16	DNQ	5	9	10	11
9	(United Kingdom) McLaren-Ford	7	Ret	11	11	4	NC	DNQ	7	8	Ret	Ret	Ret	Ret	4	NC	11
9	(United Kingdom) McLaren-Ford	8	6	5	DNS	DNQ	Ret	Ret	Ret	6	11	7	6	7	Ret	DNS	11
10	(Italy) Ferrari	1	Ret	Ret	Ret	5	8	Ret	12	10	13	13	9	8	DNQ	11	8
10	(Italy) Ferrari	2	Ret	16	Ret	Ret	6	5	8	Ret	6	8	7	Ret	5	Ret	8
11	(Italy) Alfa Romeo	22	Ret	Ret	NC	Ret	Ret	Ret	Ret	Ret			Ret	Ret	Ret	Ret	4
11	(Italy) Alfa Romeo	23	5	13	Ret	Ret	Ret	Ret	Ret	Ret	5	Ret	Ret	Ret	Ret	Ret^{P}	4
—	(West Germany) ATS-Ford	9	Ret	7	DNS	Ret	12	NC	Ret	Ret	12	12	10	Ret	DNQ	8	0
—	(West Germany) ATS-Ford	10	DNQ	DNQ	DNQ						DNQ						0
—	(United Kingdom) Ensign-Ford	14	NC	Ret	9	Ret	Ret	DNQ	DNQ	DNQ	14	DNQ	DNQ	DNQ	12	Ret	0
—	(United Kingdom) Ensign-Ford	41											Ret	DNQ			0
—	(Italy) Osella-Ford	31	DNQ	DNQ	Ret	Ret	DNQ	DNQ	Ret	Ret	Ret	Ret	Ret	12	Ret	Ret	0
—	(United Kingdom) Shadow-Ford	17	DNQ	DNQ	13	DNQ	DNQ	DNQ	DNQ								0
—	(United Kingdom) Shadow-Ford	18	DNQ	DNQ	DNQ	DNQ	DNQ	DNQ	DNQ								0
Pos	Constructor	Car no.	ARG (Argentina)	BRA (Brazil)	RSA (South Africa)	USW (United States)	BEL (Belgium)	MON (Monaco)	FRA (France)	GBR (United Kingdom)	GER (West Germany)	AUT (Austria)	NED (Netherlands)	ITA (Italy)	CAN (Canada)	USA (United States)	Points

== Non-championship races ==
The 1980 Formula One season also included two non-championship races.

Race name	Circuit	Date	Winning driver	Constructor	Report
(Spain) Spanish Grand Prix	Jarama	1 June	(Australia) Alan Jones	(United Kingdom) Williams-Ford	Report
(Australia) Australian Grand Prix	Calder Park	16 November	(Australia) Alan Jones	(United Kingdom) Williams-Ford	Report
