= Rupert Keegan =

British racing driver (1955–2024)

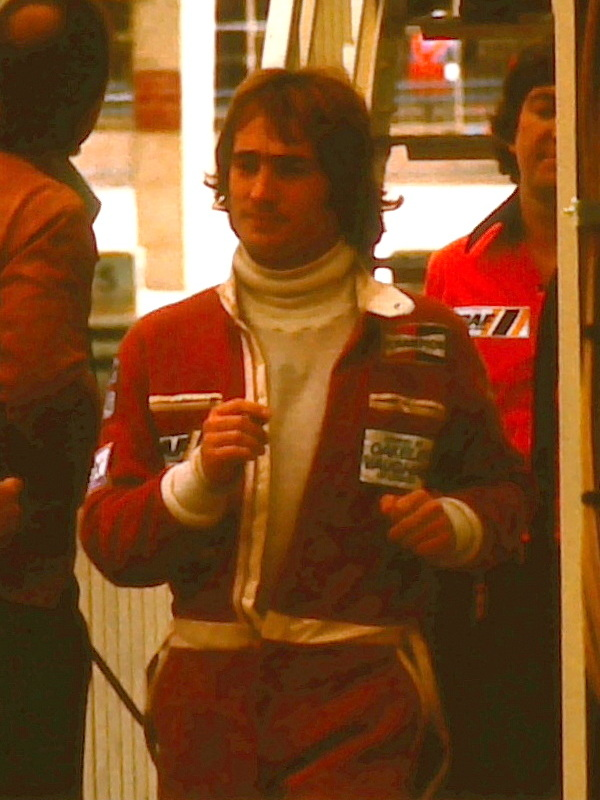
- Keegan at the 1978 Monaco Grand Prix
- Born: 26 February 1955; Westcliff-on-Sea, Essex, England
- Died: 23 September 2024 (aged 69); Portoferraio, Elba, Tuscany, Italy

Formula One World Championship career
- Nationality: (United Kingdom) British
- Active years: 1977–1978, 1980, 1982
- Team(s): Hesketh, Surtees, RAM, March
- Entries: 37 (25 starts)
- Championships: 0
- Wins: 0
- Podiums: 0
- Career points: 0
- Pole positions: 0
- Fastest laps: 0
- First entry: 1977 Spanish Grand Prix
- Last entry: 1982 Caesars Palace Grand Prix

British Formula One Championship career
- Active years: 1979
- Entries: 13
- Championships: 1
- Wins: 5
- Podiums: 6
- Career points: 65
- Pole positions: 5
- Fastest laps: 4

Rupert Keegan (26 February 1955 – 23 September 2024) was an English racing driver. He participated in 37 Formula One World Championship Grands Prix, debuting on 8 May 1977. He scored no championship points.

== Biography ==
Keegan won the 1976 British Formula 3 Championship, which propelled him into Formula One. After seasons with Hesketh and Surtees, neither of them particularly competitive teams, he won the Aurora Formula One Championship in 1979. A return to the Formula One World Championship with RAM driving their Williams FW07B yielded little in the way of results, as did a few races with March. His best career result was seventh at the 1977 Austrian Grand Prix scored in Hesketh 308E/1.

After Formula One, Keegan raced in the United States in CART, and also in endurance racing. After his retirement, he pursued business interests and also worked as a racing instructor.

Keegan died in Portoferraio after a long battle with cancer on 23 September 2024, at the age of 69.

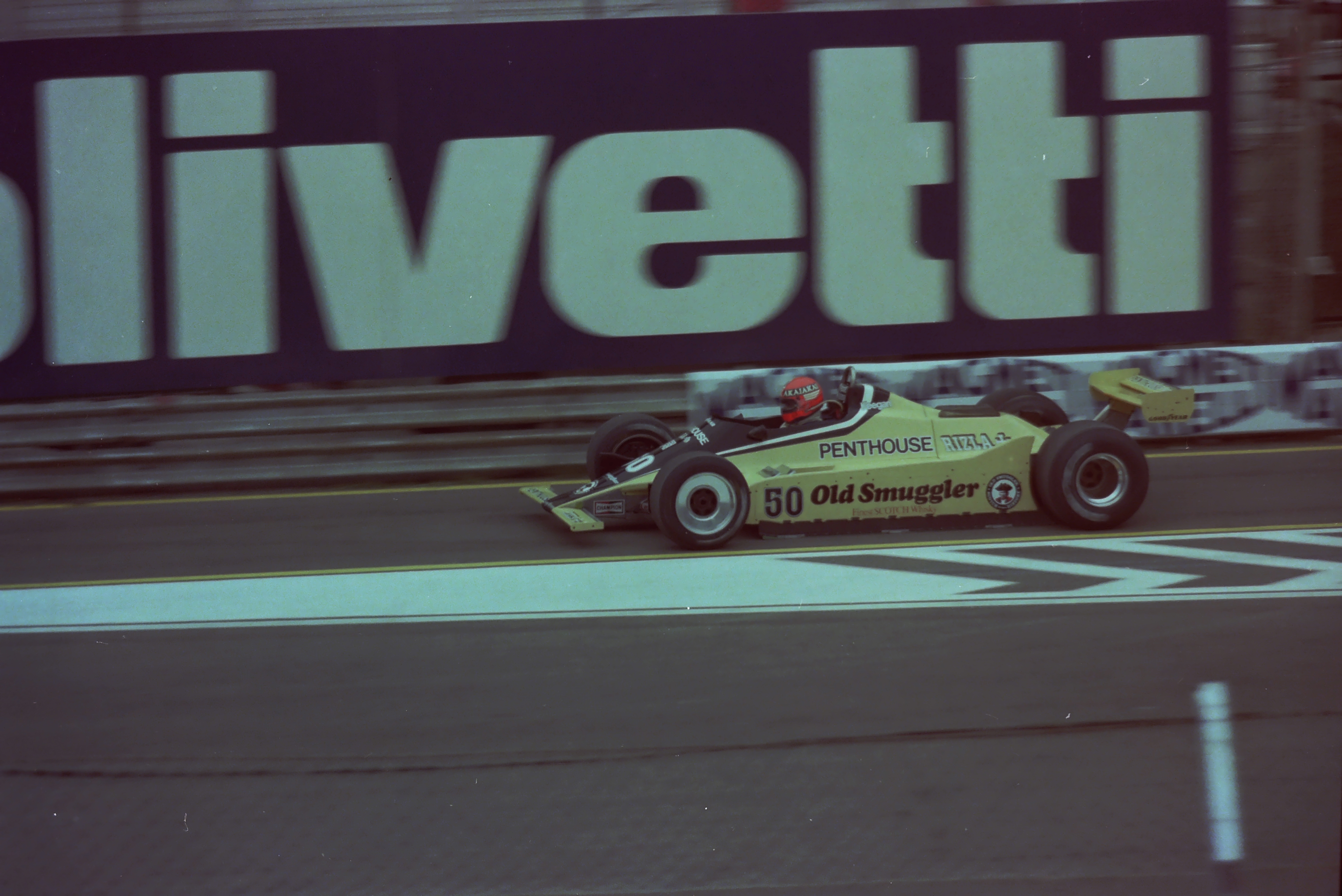
Keegan (Williams-Ford) exiting the Imola pit lane during qualifying for the 1980 Italian GP

== Racing record ==
=== Complete Formula One World Championship results ===
(key)

Year	Entrant	Chassis	Engine	1	2	3	4	5	6	7	8	9	10	11	12	13	14	15	16	17	WDC	Pts.
1977	Penthouse Rizla Racing	Hesketh 308E	Ford V8	ARG	BRA	RSA	USW	ESP; Ret	MON; 12	BEL; Ret	SWE; 13	FRA; 10	GBR; Ret	GER; Ret	AUT; 7	NED; Ret	ITA; 9	USA; 8	CAN; Ret	JPN	NC	0
1978	Durex Team Surtees	Surtees TS19	Ford V8	ARG; Ret	BRA; Ret	RSA; Ret	USW; DNS	MON; Ret	BEL; DNQ												NC	0
1978	Durex Team Surtees	Surtees TS20	Ford V8							ESP; 11	SWE; DNQ	FRA; Ret	GBR; DNQ	GER; DNQ	AUT; DNQ	NED; DNS	ITA	USA	CAN		NC	0
1980	RAM Williams Grand Prix Engineering	Williams FW07	Ford V8	ARG	BRA	RSA	USW	BEL	MON	FRA	GBR; 11										NC	0
1980	RAM Penthouse Rizla Racing	Williams FW07	Ford V8									GER; DNQ	AUT; 15	NED; DNQ	ITA; 11	CAN; DNQ	USA; 9				NC	0
1982	Rothmans March Grand Prix Team	March 821	Ford V8	RSA	BRA	USW	SMR	BEL	MON	DET	CAN	NED	GBR	FRA	GER; DNQ	AUT; Ret	SUI; Ret	ITA; DNQ	CPL; 12		NC	0

=== Complete British Formula One Championship results ===
(key) (Races in bold indicate pole position; races in italics indicate fastest lap)

Year	Entrant	Chassis	Engine	1	2	3	4	5	6	7	8	9	10	11	12	13	14	15	Pos.	Points
1979	C. W. Clowes Racing	Arrows A1	Ford Cosworth DFV 3.0 V8	ZOL	OUL; 11	**BRH**; Ret	MAL; 1	SNE; 1	THR; Ret	ZAN; NC	**DON**; 1	OUL; Ret	NOG	MAL; Ret	**BRH**; DNS	THR; 1	**SNE**; 1	**SIL**; 2	1st	65

=== Indy Car World Series ===
(key) (Races in bold indicate pole position)

Year	Team	No.	1	2	3	4	5	6	7	8	9	10	11	12	13	14	15	16	17	Rank	Points	Ref
1985	Machinists Union Racing	59	LBH	INDY	MIL	POR	MEA	CLE	MCH	ROA	POC	MDO; 19	SAN	MCH	LAG; 12	PHX	MIA; 10			**35th**	**4**	
1986	Gohr Racing	65	PHX	LBH	INDY; DNQ	MIL	POR	MEA	CLE	TOR	MIC	POC	MDO	SAN	MIC	ROA	LAG	PHX	MIA	NC	-	

Sporting positions
Preceded by Gunnar Nilsson	British Formula 3 Championship; BARC Series Champion; 1976	Succeeded by Derek Daly
Preceded by Tony Trimmer	British Formula One Champion; 1979	Succeeded by Emilio de Villota
