= 1980 Dutch Grand Prix =

- Race 11 of 14 in the 1980 Formula One season
- The Zandvoort Circuit (1980–1989)

Race details
- Date: August 31, 1980
- Official name: XXVII Grote Prijs van Nederland
- Location: Circuit Zandvoort, Zandvoort, Netherlands
- Course: Permanent racing facility
- Course length: 4.252 km (2.642 miles)
- Distance: 72 laps, 306.144 km (190.229 miles)
- Weather: Sunny, Mild, Dry

Pole position
Driver	(France) René Arnoux	Renault
- Time: 1:17.44

Fastest lap
Driver	(France) René Arnoux	Renault
- Time: 1:19.35 on lap 67

Podium
First	(Brazil) Nelson Piquet	Brabham-Ford
Second	(France) René Arnoux	Renault
Third	(France) Jacques Laffite	Ligier-Ford

The 1980 Dutch Grand Prix was a Formula One motor race held on 31 August 1980 at the Circuit Zandvoort in the Netherlands. It was the eleventh race of the 1980 Formula One season.

== Report ==
The race was the 29th Dutch Grand Prix. The race was held over 72 laps of the 4.252-kilometre circuit for a total race distance of 306 kilometres.

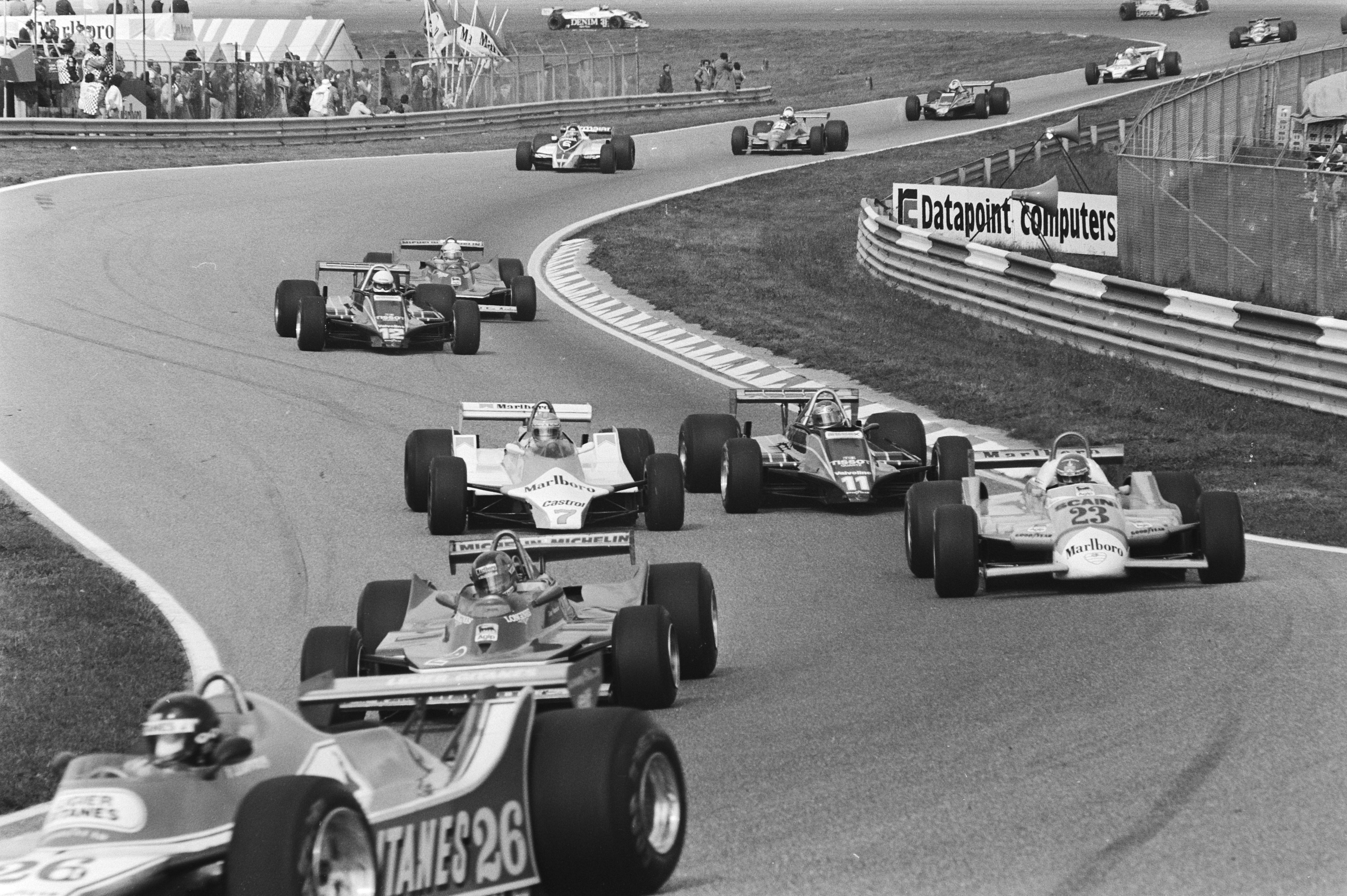
Drivers battling at the start behind the head of the race

The race was won by Brazilian driver, Nelson Piquet driving a Brabham BT49. The win was Piquet's second Formula One Grand Prix victory having taken his first win earlier the same year at the 1980 United States Grand Prix West. The win confirmed Piquet as being the major threat to Alan Jones' charge to the world championship crown. Piquet won by twelve seconds over French driver René Arnoux driving a Renault RE20. Less than half a second behind in third was another French driver Jacques Laffite (Ligier JS11/15).

The circuit had been altered for the second time in as many years with the back straight chicane tightened significantly. There were several new combinations. Alfa Romeo entered a second car, a replacement after Patrick Depailler's death a month earlier, for Italian veteran Vittorio Brambilla. Geoff Lees was entered in a second Ensign N180 and Jochen Mass returned from injury in an Arrows A3. Mass' return proved to be premature and he pulled out of the meeting. Tyrrell Racing test driver Mike Thackwell stepped into the car but failed in his attempt to be the youngest ever Formula One race starter.

Jones won the start from the second row of the grid to lead early until he pitted with damaged skirts. Laffite soon took the lead from Arnoux before both were picked-off by Piquet. Late in the race Arnoux regained second place. Behind Laffite, the second Williams FW07B of Carlos Reutemann finished fourth ahead of Jean-Pierre Jarier (driving his 100th Grand Prix) in the surviving Tyrrell 010 after Derek Daly had crashed earlier after brake failure. Young rookie Alain Prost claimed the final point debuting the new McLaren M30, while in seventh Gilles Villeneuve had given one of Ferrari's few 1980 highlights, running as high as third before his tyres went off.

Jones was three laps down in eleventh, his championship now in real danger as Piquet had closed to within two points. Reutemann now led the battle for third by a point over Laffite and three over Arnoux. Williams now had one hand firmly on the constructors' trophy, leading Ligier by 25 points and Brabham by 35 with Piquet's teammates providing virtually no support to the constructor's tally.

== Classification ==
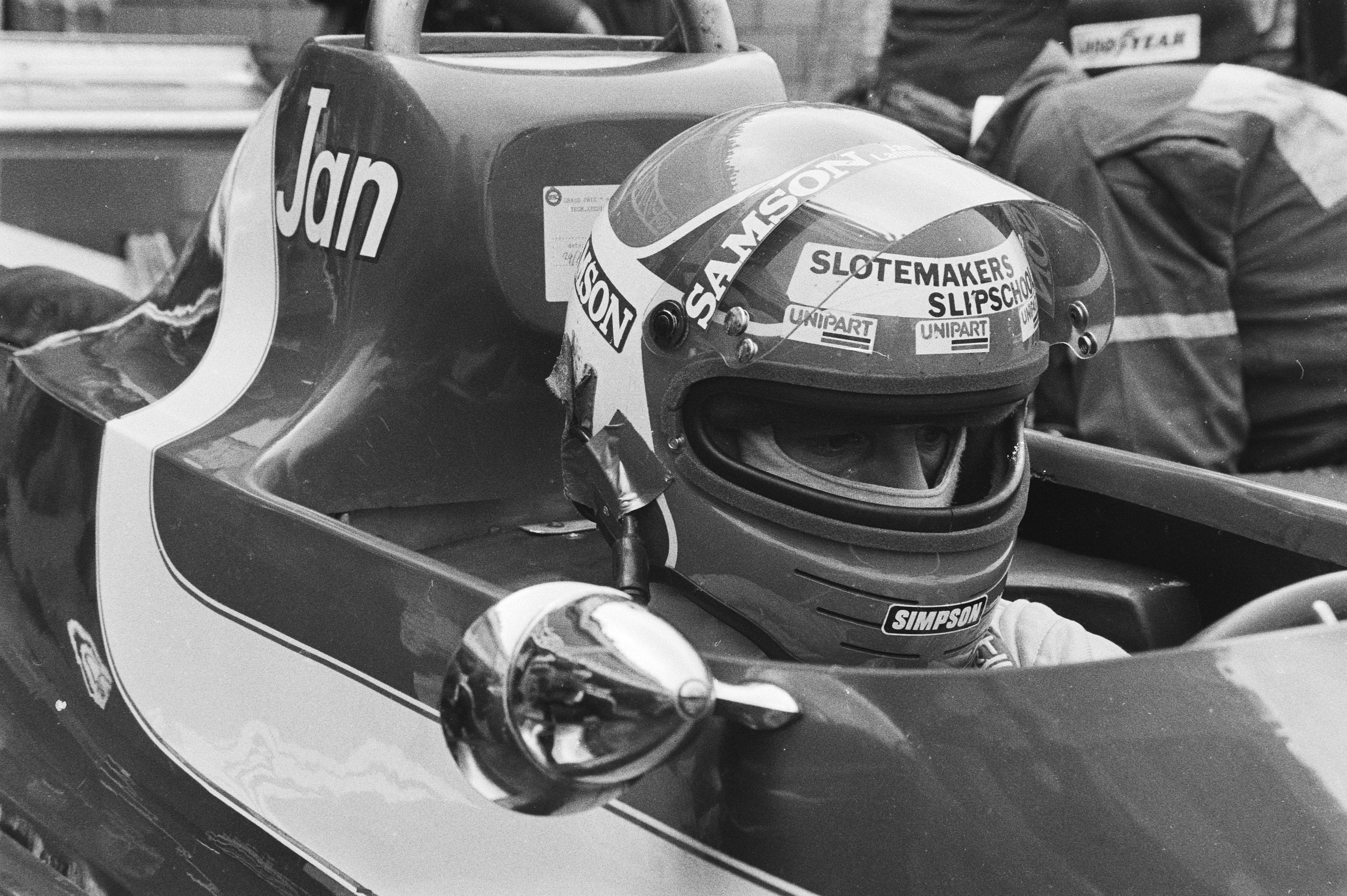
Dutch driver Jan Lammers failed to qualify to the race

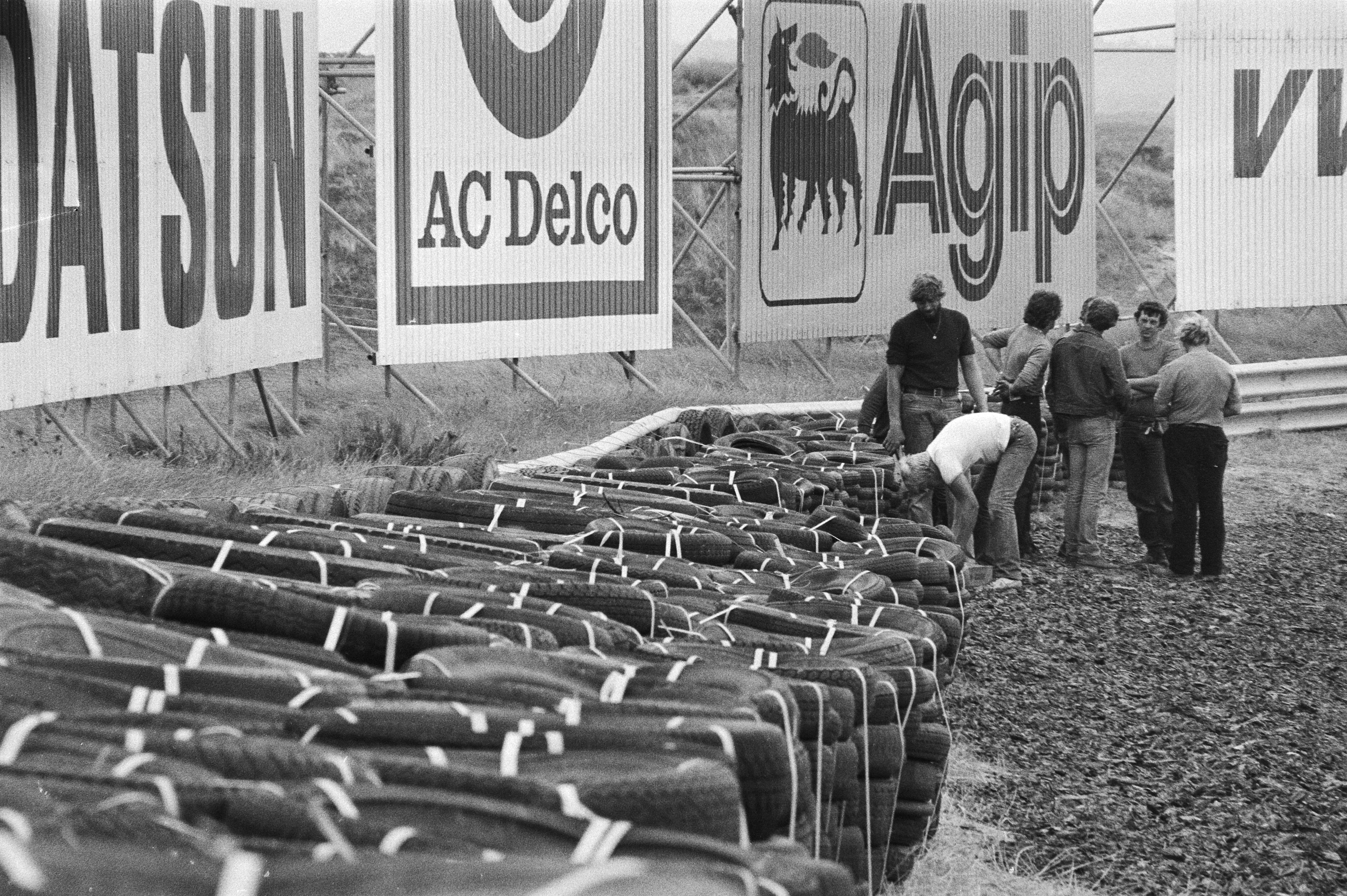
Guardrail filled with old car tires at the Tarzan curve

=== Qualifying ===
Pos	No.	Driver	Team	Time	Gap
1	16	(France) René Arnoux	Renault	1:17.44	-
2	15	(France) Jean-Pierre Jabouille	Renault	1:17.74	+ 0.30
3	28	(Argentina) Carlos Reutemann	Williams-Ford	1:17.81	+ 0.37
4	27	(Australia) Alan Jones	Williams-Ford	1:17.82	+ 0.38
5	5	(Brazil) Nelson Piquet	Brabham-Ford	1:17.85	+ 0.41
6	26	(France) Jacques Laffite	Ligier-Ford	1:18.15	+ 0.71
7	2	(Canada) Gilles Villeneuve	Ferrari	1:18.40	+ 0.96
8	23	(Italy) Bruno Giacomelli	Alfa Romeo	1:18.52	+ 1.08
9	7	(United Kingdom) John Watson	McLaren-Ford	1:18.53	+ 1.09
10	11	(United States) Mario Andretti	Lotus-Ford	1:18.60	+ 1.16
11	12	(Italy) Elio de Angelis	Lotus-Ford	1:18.74	+ 1.30
12	1	(South Africa) Jody Scheckter	Ferrari	1:18.87	+ 1.43
13	6	(Mexico) Héctor Rebaque	Brabham-Ford	1:18.89	+ 1.45
14	29	(Italy) Riccardo Patrese	Arrows-Ford	1:18.90	+ 1.46
15	25	(France) Didier Pironi	Ligier-Ford	1:18.94	+ 1.50
16	43	(United Kingdom) Nigel Mansell	Lotus-Ford	1:18.97	+ 1.53
17	3	(France) Jean-Pierre Jarier	Tyrrell-Ford	1:18.98	+ 1.54
18	8	(France) Alain Prost	McLaren-Ford	1:19.07	+ 1.63
19	31	(United States) Eddie Cheever	Osella-Ford	1:19.38	+ 1.94
20	9	(Switzerland) Marc Surer	ATS-Ford	1:19.44	+ 2.00
21	20	(Brazil) Emerson Fittipaldi	Fittipaldi-Ford	1:19.57	+ 2.13
22	22	(Italy) Vittorio Brambilla	Alfa Romeo	1:19.60	+ 2.16
23	4	(Republic of Ireland) Derek Daly	Tyrrell-Ford	1:19.68	+ 2.24
24	41	(United Kingdom) Geoff Lees	Ensign-Ford	1:19.72	+ 2.28
25	50	(United Kingdom) Rupert Keegan	Williams-Ford	1:19.96	+ 2.52
26	14	(Netherlands) Jan Lammers	Ensign-Ford	1:20.11	+ 2.67
27	30	(New Zealand) Mike Thackwell	Arrows-Ford	1:20.22	+ 2.78
28	21	(Finland) Keke Rosberg	Fittipaldi-Ford	1:20.33	+ 2.89

=== Race ===
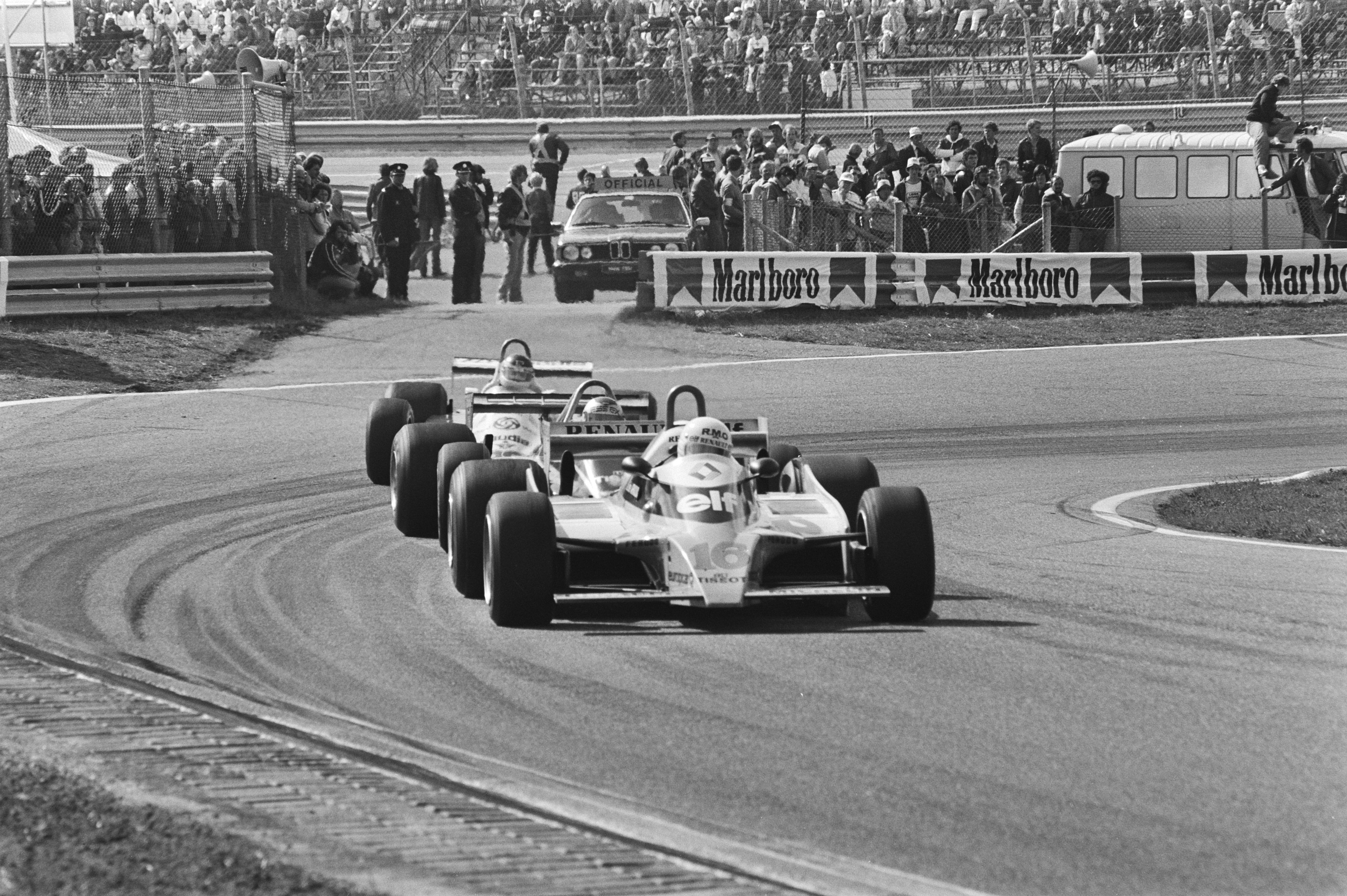
Arnoux leads the battle for fourth position, at about half distance

Pos	No	Driver	Constructor	Tyre	Laps	Time/Retired	Grid	Points
1	5	(Brazil) Nelson Piquet	Brabham-Ford	G	72	1:38:13.83	5	9
2	16	(France) René Arnoux	Renault	MI	72	+12.93 secs	1	6
3	26	(France) Jacques Laffite	Ligier-Ford	G	72	+13.43 secs	6	4
4	28	(Argentina) Carlos Reutemann	Williams-Ford	G	72	+15.29 secs	3	3
5	3	(France) Jean-Pierre Jarier	Tyrrell-Ford	G	72	+1:00.02 secs	17	2
6	8	(France) Alain Prost	McLaren-Ford	G	72	+1:22.62 secs	18	1
7	2	(Canada) Gilles Villeneuve	Ferrari	MI	71	+1 Lap	7	
8	11	(United States) Mario Andretti	Lotus-Ford	G	70	Out of Fuel	10	
9	1	(South Africa) Jody Scheckter	Ferrari	MI	70	+2 Laps	12	
10	9	(Switzerland) Marc Surer	ATS-Ford	G	69	+3 Laps	20	
11	27	(Australia) Alan Jones	Williams-Ford	G	69	+3 Laps	4	
Ret	4	(Republic of Ireland) Derek Daly	Tyrrell-Ford	G	60	Brakes	23	
Ret	23	(Italy) Bruno Giacomelli	Alfa Romeo	G	58	Accident	8	
Ret	31	(United States) Eddie Cheever	Osella-Ford	G	38	Engine	19	
Ret	29	(Italy) Riccardo Patrese	Arrows-Ford	G	29	Engine	14	
Ret	15	(France) Jean-Pierre Jabouille	Renault	MI	23	Handling	2	
Ret	22	(Italy) Vittorio Brambilla	Alfa Romeo	G	21	Accident	22	
Ret	41	(United Kingdom) Geoff Lees	Ensign-Ford	G	21	Accident	24	
Ret	7	(United Kingdom) John Watson	McLaren-Ford	G	18	Engine	9	
Ret	20	(Brazil) Emerson Fittipaldi	Fittipaldi-Ford	G	16	Brakes	21	
Ret	43	(United Kingdom) Nigel Mansell	Lotus-Ford	G	15	Brakes	16	
Ret	12	(Italy) Elio de Angelis	Lotus-Ford	G	2	Accident	11	
Ret	25	(France) Didier Pironi	Ligier-Ford	G	2	Accident	15	
Ret	6	(Mexico) Héctor Rebaque	Brabham-Ford	G	1	Gearbox	13	
DNQ	50	(United Kingdom) Rupert Keegan	Williams-Ford	G				
DNQ	14	(Netherlands) Jan Lammers	Ensign-Ford	G				
DNQ	30	(New Zealand) Mike Thackwell	Arrows-Ford	G				
DNQ	21	(Finland) Keke Rosberg	Fittipaldi-Ford	G				
WD	30	(West Germany) Jochen Mass	Arrows-Ford	G		Driver Injured		

== Notes ==
- This race marked the 99th and 100th podium finish for a French driver.
- This was the 10th pole position for Renault and a Renault-powered car.
- This was the 10th Dutch Grand Prix win for a Ford-powered car.

== Championship standings after the race ==
Drivers' Championship standings

Pos	Driver	Points
1	(Australia) **Alan Jones***	47
2	(Brazil) **Nelson Piquet***	45
3	(Argentina) **Carlos Reutemann***	33
4	(France) **Jacques Laffite***	32
5	(France) **René Arnoux***	29

Constructors' Championship standings

	Pos	Constructor	Points
	1	(United Kingdom) **Williams-Ford***	80
	2	(France) **Ligier-Ford***	55
	3	(United Kingdom) Brabham-Ford	45
	4	(France) Renault	38
1	5	(United Kingdom) Tyrrell-Ford	12

- Note: Only the top five positions are included for both sets of standings.
- Competitors in bold and marked with an asterisk still had a theoretical chance of becoming World Champion.

Previous race: 1980 Austrian Grand Prix	FIA Formula One World Championship; 1980 season	Next race: 1980 Italian Grand Prix
Previous race: 1979 Dutch Grand Prix	Dutch Grand Prix	Next race: 1981 Dutch Grand Prix
