= 1980 Canadian Grand Prix =

- Race 13 of 14 in the 1980 Formula One season

Race details
- Date: September 28, 1980
- Official name: XIX Grand Prix Labatt du Canada
- Location: Circuit Île Notre-Dame, Montreal, Quebec, Canada
- Course: Permanent racing facility
- Course length: 4.410 km (2.740 miles)
- Distance: 70 laps, 308.700 km (191.817 miles)
- Weather: Cold and dry with temperatures reaching up to 11 °C (52 °F); wind speeds up to 15.9 kilometres per hour (9.9 mph)

Pole position
Driver	(Brazil) Nelson Piquet	Brabham-Ford
- Time: 1:27.328

Fastest lap
Driver	(France) Didier Pironi	Ligier-Ford
- Time: 1:28.769 on lap 62

Podium
First	(Australia) Alan Jones	Williams-Ford
Second	(Argentina) Carlos Reutemann	Williams-Ford
Third	(France) Didier Pironi	Ligier-Ford

The 1980 Canadian Grand Prix was a Formula One motor race held on 28 September 1980, at the Circuit Île Notre-Dame in Montreal, Quebec, Canada. It was the thirteenth and penultimate race of the 1980 Formula One season. The race was the 19th Canadian Grand Prix and the third to be held in Montreal. The race was held over 70 laps of the 4.41-kilometre circuit for a total race distance of 309 kilometres.

Australian driver Alan Jones, driving a Williams FW07B, won his second consecutive Canadian Grand Prix, and coupled with the retirement of the Brabham BT49 of Brazilian driver Nelson Piquet due to the failure of its Cosworth DFV engine, this allowed Jones to secure the 1980 World Drivers' Championship. Jones became only the second Australian to claim the world championship, a title last won by Jack Brabham in 1966. It was also the first World Drivers' Championship for Williams Grand Prix Engineering, adding to their first Constructors' Championship, achieved two weeks earlier at the Italian Grand Prix. The race featured a controversial first start where Piquet and Jones raced side by side to the first corner and touched, causing Piquet to hit the wall, sparking off other accidents behind. Piquet was forced to restart in his more fragile qualifying car, which ultimately led to his retirement and the end of the title battle. Some commentators thought Jones had forced Piquet into the wall, but the Brazilian shrugged it off as a racing incident.

The brief comeback of Vittorio Brambilla had come to an end with the Italian veteran retiring from Formula One. Alfa Romeo replaced him with someone younger and Andrea de Cesaris made his Grand Prix debut, as did teenage New Zealander Mike Thackwell. Thackwell stepped aboard a third Tyrrell 010 breaking the record as the youngest ever driver to start a Grand Prix, a record held for 19 years by the late Mexican teenager Ricardo Rodríguez. The record would stand for 29 years until broken by Jaime Alguersuari in 2009.

First and second in the championship were decided with the 1980 United States Grand Prix still to come. Jones led Piquet by 8 points but Piquet had already had five points-scoring finishes in the second half of the season. If Piquet won at Watkins Glen he would have to drop the two points from his fifth-place finish in Austria, leaving him one point behind Jones even if Jones failed to finish. Third place in the championship was theoretically open with Laffite eight points behind Reutemann. Second place in the constructors' championship was still open with Brabham just five points behind Ligier. The race weekend is also notable because the outgoing World Champion Jody Scheckter failed to qualify his Ferrari 312T5 for the event.

== Qualifying ==
=== Qualifying classification ===
Pos	No.	Driver	Team	Time	Gap
1	5	(Brazil) Nelson Piquet	Brabham-Ford	1:27.328	-
2	27	(Australia) Alan Jones	Williams-Ford	1:28.164	+ 0.836
3	25	(France) Didier Pironi	Ligier-Ford	1:28.322	+ 0.994
4	23	(Italy) Bruno Giacomelli	Alfa Romeo	1:28.575	+ 1.247
5	28	(Argentina) Carlos Reutemann	Williams-Ford	1:28.663	+ 1.335
6	21	(Finland) Keke Rosberg	Fittipaldi-Ford	1:28.702	+ 1.374
7	7	(United Kingdom) John Watson	McLaren-Ford	1:28.755	+ 1.427
8	22	(Italy) Andrea de Cesaris	Alfa Romeo	1:29.026	+ 1.698
9	26	(France) Jacques Laffite	Ligier-Ford	1:29.130	+ 1.802
10	6	(Mexico) Héctor Rebaque	Brabham-Ford	1:29.377	+ 2.049
11	29	(Italy) Riccardo Patrese	Arrows-Ford	1:29.400	+ 2.072
12	8	(France) Alain Prost	McLaren-Ford	1:29.804	+ 2.476
13	15	(France) Jean-Pierre Jabouille	Renault	1:29.932	+ 2.604
14	31	(United States) Eddie Cheever	Osella-Ford	1:29.937	+ 2.609
15	3	(France) Jean-Pierre Jarier	Tyrrell-Ford	1:30.070	+ 2.742
16	20	(Brazil) Emerson Fittipaldi	Fittipaldi-Ford	1:30.294	+ 2.966
17	12	(Italy) Elio de Angelis	Lotus-Ford	1:30.316	+ 2.988
18	11	(United States) Mario Andretti	Lotus-Ford	1:30.559	+ 3.231
19	14	(Netherlands) Jan Lammers	Ensign-Ford	1:30.668	+ 3.340
20	4	(Republic of Ireland) Derek Daly	Tyrrell-Ford	1:30.791	+ 3.463
21	30	(West Germany) Jochen Mass	Arrows-Ford	1:30.831	+ 3.503
22	2	(Canada) Gilles Villeneuve	Ferrari	1:30.855	+ 3.527
23	16	(France) René Arnoux	Renault	1:30.912	+ 3.584
24	43	(New Zealand) Mike Thackwell	Tyrrell-Ford	1:31.036	+ 3.708
25	9	(Switzerland) Marc Surer	ATS-Ford	1:31.169	+ 3.841
26	1	(South Africa) Jody Scheckter	Ferrari	1:31.688	+ 4.360
27	50	(United Kingdom) Rupert Keegan	Williams-Ford	1:32.638	+ 5.310
28	51	(United States) Kevin Cogan	Williams-Ford	1:32.745	+ 5.417

== Race ==
Piquet qualified on pole from Jones but used a car in fragile qualifying specification to do it. At the start Jones outlaunched Piquet but the pair refused to compromise at the first turn and the two touched, triggering a multi-car pile-up. The collision involved Jean-Pierre Jarier (Tyrrell 010), Derek Daly (Tyrrell 010), Emerson Fittipaldi (Fittipaldi F8), Keke Rosberg (Fittipaldi F8), Mario Andretti (Lotus 81), Gilles Villeneuve (Ferrari 312T5) and Jochen Mass (Arrows A3). Piquet, Fittipaldi, Villeneuve, Andretti and Mass restarted in spare cars, in Piquet's case his fragile qualifying car and Rosberg had his car repaired. Daly was out as was Thackwell as Jarier commandeered his Tyrrell 010. At the restart Jones led before a storming Piquet took the lead until his qualifying specification Cosworth DFV inevitably failed. Two laps later and Jean-Pierre Jabouille crashed his Renault RE20 heavily, seriously injuring his legs. Jabouille had to be cut from the car.

Jones took up the lead again until Pironi forced his way into a lead which was clouded over a jumped start for which he was eventually assigned a 60-second penalty. Pironi took the chequered flag first but would be classified third behind Jones and Reutemann. Alain Prost could have been third or even second until a suspension failure saw his McLaren M30 crash. Watson was ahead of Reutemann as well when he spun and finished fourth in his McLaren. Local hero Villeneuve claimed fifth for Ferrari on a dismal weekend that saw outgoing World Champion Jody Scheckter fail to qualify his Ferrari 312T5. The final point was claimed by Héctor Rebaque in his Brabham BT49 as Jacques Laffite ran out of fuel in his Ligier JS11/15 in the closing stages.

=== Race classification ===
Pos	No	Driver	Constructor	Tyre	Laps	Time/Retired	Grid	Points
1	27	(Australia) Alan Jones	Williams-Ford	G	70	1:46:45.53	2	9
2	28	(Argentina) Carlos Reutemann	Williams-Ford	G	70	+15.54 secs	5	6
3	25	(France) Didier Pironi	Ligier-Ford	G	70	+19.07 secs	3	4
4	7	(United Kingdom) John Watson	McLaren-Ford	G	70	+30.98 secs	7	3
5	2	(Canada) Gilles Villeneuve	Ferrari	MI	70	+55.23 secs	22	2
6	6	(Mexico) Héctor Rebaque	Brabham-Ford	G	69	+1 Lap	10	1
7	3	(France) Jean-Pierre Jarier	Tyrrell-Ford	G	69	+1 Lap	15	
8	26	(France) Jacques Laffite	Ligier-Ford	G	68	Out of fuel	9	
9	21	(Finland) Keke Rosberg	Fittipaldi-Ford	G	68	+2 Laps	6	
10	12	(Italy) Elio de Angelis	Lotus-Ford	G	68	+2 Laps	17	
11	30	(West Germany) Jochen Mass	Arrows-Ford	G	67	+3 Laps	21	
12	14	(Netherlands) Jan Lammers	Ensign-Ford	G	66	+4 Laps	19	
Ret	8	(France) Alain Prost	McLaren-Ford	G	41	Suspension	12	
Ret	16	(France) René Arnoux	Renault	MI	39	Brakes	23	
Ret	15	(France) Jean-Pierre Jabouille	Renault	MI	25	Suspension/Accident	13	
Ret	5	(Brazil) Nelson Piquet	Brabham-Ford	G	23	Engine	1	
Ret	11	(United States) Mario Andretti	Lotus-Ford	G	11	Engine	18	
Ret	22	(Italy) Andrea de Cesaris	Alfa Romeo	G	8	Engine	8	
Ret	31	(United States) Eddie Cheever	Osella-Ford	G	8	Fuel system	14	
Ret	20	(Brazil) Emerson Fittipaldi	Fittipaldi-Ford	G	8	Gearbox	16	
Ret	23	(Italy) Bruno Giacomelli	Alfa Romeo	G	7	Chassis	4	
Ret	29	(Italy) Riccardo Patrese	Arrows-Ford	G	6	Accident	11	
Ret	4	(Republic of Ireland) Derek Daly	Tyrrell-Ford	G	0	Accident	20	
Ret	43	(New Zealand) Mike Thackwell	Tyrrell-Ford	G	0	Car commandeered by Jarier	24	
DNQ	9	(Switzerland) Marc Surer	ATS-Ford	G				
DNQ	1	(South Africa) Jody Scheckter	Ferrari	MI				
DNQ	50	(United Kingdom) Rupert Keegan	Williams-Ford	G				
DNQ	51	(United States) Kevin Cogan	Williams-Ford	G				

== Notes ==
- This was the Formula One World Championship debut for New Zealand driver Mike Thackwell, Italian driver Andrea de Cesaris and American driver Kevin Cogan.
- This was the 10th Grand Prix win for Williams.
- This was the 10th Canadian Grand Prix win for a Ford-powered car.

== Championship standings after the race ==
Drivers' Championship standings

Pos	Driver	Points
1	(Australia) **Alan Jones**	62
2	(Brazil) Nelson Piquet	54
3	(Argentina) Carlos Reutemann	40 (43)
4	(France) Jacques Laffite	32
5	(France) René Arnoux	29

Constructors' Championship standings

Pos	Constructor	Points
1	(United Kingdom) **Williams-Ford**	105
2	(France) Ligier-Ford	60
3	(United Kingdom) Brabham-Ford	55
4	(France) Renault	38
5	(United Kingdom) Tyrrell-Ford	12

- Note: Only the top five positions are included for both sets of standings. Only the best 5 results from the first 7 races and the best 5 results from the last 7 races counted towards the Drivers' Championship. If different to Championship points, total points scored are shown in parentheses.
- **Bold text** indicates the 1980 World Champions.

Previous race: 1980 Italian Grand Prix	FIA Formula One World Championship; 1980 season	Next race: 1980 United States Grand Prix
Previous race: 1979 Canadian Grand Prix	Canadian Grand Prix	Next race: 1981 Canadian Grand Prix
