= 1980 United States Grand Prix =

- Race 14 of 14 in the 1980 Formula One season
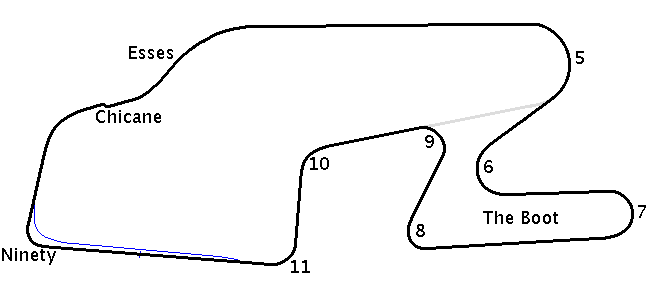

Race details
- Date: October 5, 1980
- Official name: XXIII Toyota United States Grand Prix
- Location: Watkins Glen Grand Prix Race Course; Watkins Glen, New York
- Course: Permanent road course
- Course length: 5.435 km (3.377 miles)
- Distance: 59 laps, 320.67 km (199.24 miles)
- Weather: Cloudy and dry with temperatures reaching up to 12 °C (54 °F); Wind speeds up to 14.82 km/h (9.21 mph)

Pole position
Driver	(Italy) Bruno Giacomelli	Alfa Romeo
- Time: 1:33.291

Fastest lap
Driver	(Australia) Alan Jones	Williams-Ford
- Time: 1:34.068 on lap 44

Podium
First	(Australia) Alan Jones	Williams-Ford
Second	(Argentina) Carlos Reutemann	Williams-Ford
Third	(France) Didier Pironi	Ligier-Ford

The 1980 United States Grand Prix was a Formula One motor race held on October 5, 1980 at the Watkins Glen Grand Prix Race Course in Watkins Glen, New York. This event was also referred to as the United States Grand Prix East in order to distinguish it from the United States Grand Prix West held on March 30, 1980 in Long Beach, California.

It was the fourteenth and final race of the 1980 Formula One season. The race was the 30th United States Grand Prix, the 20th and last to be held at Watkins Glen, and the last to be held for nine years (other Formula One races were held in the United States during that time, but none were billed as the United States Grand Prix). The race was held over 59 laps of the 5.435-kilometre (3.377 mi) circuit for a total race distance of 320.67 kilometres (199.26 mi).

The race was won by the new World Champion, Australian driver Alan Jones, driving a Williams FW07B. It was Jones' fifth World Championship Formula One victory of the season and the sixth of the seven Grands Prix (including Spain and Australia) he would win in his career defining season. Jones won by four seconds over his Argentine team mate Carlos Reutemann with French driver Didier Pironi finishing third in his Ligier JS11/15. Two former World Champions, Emerson Fittipaldi and Jody Scheckter, retired after the race, although Fittipaldi would later return to racing in the American CART series.

== Summary ==
Frank Williams' first Championship season, his eleventh as an owner, ended in style with another victory by team leader and new Driver's Champion Alan Jones, but this was the last Grand Prix to be held on the historic Watkins Glen course in the wooded hills at the foot of Seneca Lake. The Glen's demise came about when attempts to resurface the track proved not to be enough, runoff areas became too short for the speeds produced, and attendance was not what it had been, for even this race had been in doubt until just a month before.

As the track's last Grand Prix weekend got under way, the big surprise of qualifying was the Alfa Romeo of Italian Bruno Giacomelli, who was quickest in both Friday's and Saturday's sessions, averaging 130.314 mph (209.720 km/h). Giacomelli took the only pole of his 69-race career, and the first for Alfa Romeo since Juan Manuel Fangio at the 1951 Italian Grand Prix, by three-quarters of a second over a tightly-bunched group including Nelson Piquet's Brabham, Carlos Reutemann's Williams, Elio de Angelis' Lotus and Jones in the second Williams.

Race day threatened rain, but none appeared. Alain Prost, completing his first F1 season had a heavy crash at Turn 10 during Friday practice. He hit his head on his McLaren's steering wheel and suffered a concussion, forcing him to miss the race. This enabled Dutchman Jan Lammers to start the race, and Prost, already having suffered 8 previous mechanical failures during the season chose to leave McLaren for the factory Renault team. At the start, Giacomelli got off the line well and led into the first turn. Jones rocketed forward from fifth on the grid to second entering Turn One, but he could not hold his line through the turn. He, along with Giacomelli's teammate Andrea de Cesaris swung wide onto the dirt, then collected himself and continued, finishing the first lap in fourteenth place.

At the end of a lap, Giacomelli had opened a gap back to Piquet, followed by Reutemann, Didier Pironi, de Angelis and Héctor Rebaque. In two more laps, the Alfa was ahead by two and a half seconds. Meanwhile, Jones was battling his way back through the field, and on lap 7, he was already poking around the gearbox of John Watson's McLaren, trying to take seventh place. Watson held him off until the tenth lap, and, once by, Jones quickly pulled away after de Angelis and Pironi.

Giacomelli continued to set an even pace, and his lead was ten seconds on lap 21, with Reutemann now threatening Piquet, whose tires were beginning to go off. Jones had caught up to de Angelis, and on the next lap, got around him for fifth.

Reutemann's pressure, and the Brabham's increasing lack of grip, finally got to Piquet on lap 26 as he spun off in turn one. The off-road excursion damaged a skirt, and he retired after reaching the pits. Three laps later, Jones passed Pironi for third, as the Ligier was also suffering from tire wear.

The only car between Jones and the leader now was teammate Reutemann, but with the Driver's Championship already in Jones' hands, there would be no team orders. Understeer induced by a worn left front tire was plaguing the Argentine, however, and Jones easily overcame him on lap 30 and set his sights on Giacomelli, now 12 seconds ahead. The red and white Alfa Romeo coasted to a halt in the Boot on lap 32 with electrical trouble. Once in the lead, Jones went faster and faster, finally doing a 1:34.068 on lap 44, better than his qualifying time.

When Watson pitted to replace a broken shock absorber on his McLaren, crowd favorite Mario Andretti moved up to the final points position. A set of new tires allowed René Arnoux to catch and pass the American, but a broken skirt soon slowed the Renault, and Andretti was able to regain the sixth spot and score his only point of the season.

The Williams team celebrated the climax to a year in which they had taken the Driver's and Constructor's Championships by waving a huge Union Flag at their one-two finish. The race saw not only the end of Formula One at Watkins Glen, but former champions Emerson Fittipaldi and Jody Scheckter's last Grand Prix and Mario Andretti's last race for Colin Chapman and Lotus. This Grand Prix would also witness the final occasion where a privateer entry would be classified as a finisher with Rupert Keegan finishing in 9th place in a RAM Racing-entered Williams FW07.

== Classification ==
=== Qualifying ===
Pos	No.	Driver	Constructor	Time	Gap
1	23	(Italy) Bruno Giacomelli	Alfa Romeo	1:33.291	
2	5	(Brazil) Nelson Piquet	Brabham-Ford	1:34.080	+0.789
3	28	(Argentina) Carlos Reutemann	Williams-Ford	1:34.111	+0.820
4	12	(Italy) Elio de Angelis	Lotus-Ford	1:34.185	+0.894
5	27	(Australia) Alan Jones	Williams-Ford	1:34.216	+0.925
6	16	(France) René Arnoux	Renault	1:34.839	+1.548
7	25	(France) Didier Pironi	Ligier-Ford	1:34.971	+1.680
8	6	(Mexico) Héctor Rebaque	Brabham-Ford	1:35.166	+1.875
9	7	(United Kingdom) John Watson	McLaren-Ford	1:35.202	+1.921
10	22	(Italy) Andrea de Cesaris	Alfa Romeo	1:35.235	+1.954
11	11	(United States) Mario Andretti	Lotus-Ford	1:35.343	+2.052
12	26	(France) Jacques Laffite	Ligier-Ford	1:35.421	+2.130
13	8	(France) Alain Prost	McLaren-Ford	1:35.988	+2.697
14	21	(Finland) Keke Rosberg	Fittipaldi-Ford	1:36.332	+3.041
15	50	(United Kingdom) Rupert Keegan	Williams-Ford	1:36.750	+3.459
16	31	(United States) Eddie Cheever	Osella-Ford	1:36.908	+3.607
17	9	(Switzerland) Marc Surer	ATS-Ford	1:37.001	+3.710
18	2	(Canada) Gilles Villeneuve	Ferrari	1:37.040	+3.749
19	20	(Brazil) Emerson Fittipaldi	Fittipaldi-Ford	1:37.088	+3.797
20	29	(Italy) Riccardo Patrese	Arrows-Ford	1:37.405	+4.114
21	4	(Republic of Ireland) Derek Daly	Tyrrell-Ford	1:37.923	+4.632
22	3	(France) Jean-Pierre Jarier	Tyrrell-Ford	1:37.966	+4.675
23	1	(South Africa) Jody Scheckter	Ferrari	1:38.149	+4.858
24	30	(West Germany) Jochen Mass	Arrows-Ford	1:38.526	+5.535
25	14	(Netherlands) Jan Lammers	Ensign-Ford	1:38.532	+5.541
DNQ	43	(New Zealand) Mike Thackwell	Tyrrell-Ford	1:51.102	+17.811
DNQ	51	(United Kingdom) Geoff Lees	Williams-Ford	-	-
DNA	60	(United Kingdom) Nigel Mansell*	Lotus-Ford	-	-
DNA	15	(France) Jean-Pierre Jabouille*	Renault	-	-

* – Mansell was originally entered in this race, but Andretti used the car originally allocated to Mansell after Andretti wrote off his car during the Canadian Grand Prix one week earlier. Jabouille was also entered in this race, but had to miss out due to leg injuries sustained at the same Canadian race.

=== Race ===
Pos	No	Driver	Constructor	Tyre	Laps	Time/Retired	Grid	Points
1	27	(Australia) Alan Jones	Williams-Ford	G	59	1:34:36.05	5	9
2	28	(Argentina) Carlos Reutemann	Williams-Ford	G	59	+ 4.21	3	6
3	25	(France) Didier Pironi	Ligier-Ford	G	59	+ 12.57	7	4
4	12	(Italy) Elio de Angelis	Lotus-Ford	G	59	+ 29.69	4	3
5	26	(France) Jacques Laffite	Ligier-Ford	G	58	+ 1 lap	12	2
6	11	(United States) Mario Andretti	Lotus-Ford	G	58	+ 1 lap	11	1
7	16	(France) René Arnoux	Renault	MI	58	+ 1 lap	6	
8	9	(Switzerland) Marc Surer	ATS-Ford	G	57	+ 2 laps	17	
9	50	(United Kingdom) Rupert Keegan	Williams-Ford	G	57	+ 2 laps	15	
10	21	(Finland) Keke Rosberg	Fittipaldi-Ford	G	57	+ 2 laps	14	
11	1	(South Africa) Jody Scheckter	Ferrari	MI	56	+ 3 laps	23	
NC	7	(United Kingdom) John Watson	McLaren-Ford	G	50	+ 9 laps	9	
Ret	2	(Canada) Gilles Villeneuve	Ferrari	MI	49	Accident	18	
NC	3	(France) Jean-Pierre Jarier	Tyrrell-Ford	G	40	+ 19 laps	22	
Ret	30	(West Germany) Jochen Mass	Arrows-Ford	G	36	Transmission	24	
Ret	23	(Italy) Bruno Giacomelli	Alfa Romeo	G	31	Electrical	1	
Ret	5	(Brazil) Nelson Piquet	Brabham-Ford	G	25	Spun off	2	
Ret	6	(Mexico) Héctor Rebaque	Brabham-Ford	G	20	Engine	8	
Ret	31	(United States) Eddie Cheever	Osella-Ford	G	20	Suspension	16	
Ret	29	(Italy) Riccardo Patrese	Arrows-Ford	G	16	Spun off	20	
Ret	14	(Netherlands) Jan Lammers	Ensign-Ford	G	16	Steering	25	
Ret	20	(Brazil) Emerson Fittipaldi	Fittipaldi-Ford	G	15	Suspension	19	
Ret	4	(Republic of Ireland) Derek Daly	Tyrrell-Ford	G	3	Spun off	21	
Ret	22	(Italy) Andrea de Cesaris	Alfa Romeo	G	2	Accident	10	
DNS	8	(France) Alain Prost	McLaren-Ford	G		Driver injured	13	

== Notes ==
- This was the 10th Grand Prix start for Osella.
- This was the 25th podium finish for Ligier.

== Final championship standings ==
Drivers' Championship standings

	Pos	Driver	Points
	1	(Australia) **Alan Jones**	67 (71)
	2	(Brazil) Nelson Piquet	54
	3	(Argentina) Carlos Reutemann	42 (49)
	4	(France) Jacques Laffite	34
1	5	(France) Didier Pironi	32

Constructors' Championship standings

	Pos	Constructor	Points
	1	(United Kingdom) **Williams-Ford**	120
	2	(France) Ligier-Ford	66
	3	(United Kingdom) Brabham-Ford	55
	4	(France) Renault	38
4	5	(United Kingdom) Lotus-Ford	14

- Note: Only the top five positions are included for both sets of standings. Only the best 5 results from the first 7 races and the best 5 results from the last 7 races counted towards the Drivers' Championship. If different from Championship points, total points scored are shown in parentheses.
- **Bold text** indicates the 1980 World Champions.

Previous race: 1980 Canadian Grand Prix	FIA Formula One World Championship; 1980 season	Next race: 1981 United States Grand Prix West
Previous race: 1979 United States Grand Prix	United States Grand Prix	Next race: 1989 United States Grand Prix
