= 1980 Austrian Grand Prix =

- Race 10 of 14 in the 1980 Formula One season
- The Österreichring Circuit (1977-1995)

Race details
- Date: 17 August 1980
- Official name: XVIII Großer Preis von Osterreich
- Location: Österreichring, Spielberg, Austria
- Course: Permanent racing facility
- Course length: 5.942 km (3.692 miles)
- Distance: 54 laps, 320.868 km (199.378 miles)
- Weather: Mild, Dry

Pole position
Driver	(France) René Arnoux	Renault
- Time: 1:30.27

Fastest lap
Driver	(France) René Arnoux	Renault
- Time: 1:32.53 on lap 50

Podium
First	(France) Jean-Pierre Jabouille	Renault
Second	(Australia) Alan Jones	Williams-Ford
Third	(Argentina) Carlos Reutemann	Williams-Ford

The 1980 Austrian Grand Prix was a Formula One motor race held on 17 August 1980 at the Österreichring circuit in Austria. It was the tenth race of the 1980 Formula One season. The race was the 13th Austrian Grand Prix and the eleventh to be held at the Österreichring. The race was held over 54 laps of the 5.942-kilometre circuit for a total race distance of 321 kilometres.

The race was won by French driver, Jean-Pierre Jabouille driving a Renault RE20. The win was Jabouille's second and last Formula One Grand Prix victory. It was also his first points finish in over a year since his previous victory at the 1979 French Grand Prix. It would also be the last points finish of his career. Jabouille won by eight-tenths of a second over Australian driver Alan Jones driving a Williams FW07B. Third was Jones' Williams teammate, Argentine driver Carlos Reutemann.

At the high-altitude circuit the turbocharged Renaults dominated qualifying, with René Arnoux securing the pole over Jabouille but Jones won the start, leading until Arnoux took over on lap 3. Arnoux pitted for tyres on lap 21 handing Jabouille the lead he only just kept and Jones fell just short as Jabouille limped home on wrecked tyres.

Behind Reutemann, French driver Jacques Laffite was fourth in his Ligier JS11/15 with Brazilian driver Nelson Piquet (Brabham BT49) and Italian driver Elio de Angelis (Lotus 81) completing the points finishers. Team Lotus ran a third car for debutant British driver Nigel Mansell. The future world champion retired with a broken engine after 40 laps and suffered burns after he raced in overalls soaked in fuel after a pre-race incident. West German driver Jochen Mass did not make the start, crashing and rolling his Arrows A3 and injuring himself in practice.

Jones now led Piquet by eleven points, Reutemann by 17 and Laffite by 19. Williams now led Ligier in the constructors' championship by 26 points and Brabham by 41.

== Classification ==
=== Qualifying ===
Pos	No.	Driver	Constructor	Time	Gap
1	16	(France) René Arnoux	Renault	1:30.27	-
2	15	(France) Jean-Pierre Jabouille	Renault	1:31.48	+ 1.21
3	27	(Australia) Alan Jones	Williams-Ford	1:32.95	+ 2.68
4	28	(Argentina) Carlos Reutemann	Williams-Ford	1:33.07	+ 2.80
5	26	(France) Jacques Laffite	Ligier-Ford	1:33.16	+ 2.89
6	25	(France) Didier Pironi	Ligier-Ford	1:33.22	+ 2.95
7	5	(Brazil) Nelson Piquet	Brabham-Ford	1:33.39	+ 3.12
8	23	(Italy) Bruno Giacomelli	Alfa Romeo	1:33.64	+ 3.37
9	12	(Italy) Elio de Angelis	Lotus-Ford	1:33.76	+ 3.49
10	4	(Republic of Ireland) Derek Daly	Tyrrell-Ford	1:34.17	+ 3.90
11	21	(Finland) Keke Rosberg	Fittipaldi-Ford	1:34.33	+ 4.06
12	8	(France) Alain Prost	McLaren-Ford	1:34.35	+ 4.08
13	3	(France) Jean-Pierre Jarier	Tyrrell-Ford	1:34.63	+ 4.36
14	6	(Mexico) Héctor Rebaque	Brabham-Ford	1:34.86	+ 4.59
15	2	(Canada) Gilles Villeneuve	Ferrari	1:34.87	+ 4.60
16	9	(Switzerland) Marc Surer	ATS-Ford	1:35.10	+ 4.83
17	11	(United States) Mario Andretti	Lotus-Ford	1:35.20	+ 4.93
18	29	(Italy) Riccardo Patrese	Arrows-Ford	1:35.29	+ 5.02
19	31	(United States) Eddie Cheever	Osella-Ford	1:35.40	+ 5.13
20	50	(United Kingdom) Rupert Keegan	Williams-Ford	1:35.53	+ 5.26
21	7	(United Kingdom) John Watson	McLaren-Ford	1:35.56	+ 5.29
22	1	(South Africa) Jody Scheckter	Ferrari	1:35.61	+ 5.34
23	20	(Brazil) Emerson Fittipaldi	Fittipaldi-Ford	1:35.67	+ 5.40
24	43	(United Kingdom) Nigel Mansell	Lotus-Ford	1:35.71	+ 5.44
25	14	(Netherlands) Jan Lammers	Ensign-Ford	1:36.04	+ 5.77
26	30	(West Germany) Jochen Mass	Arrows-Ford	No time	

=== Race ===
Pos	No	Driver	Constructor	Tyre	Laps	Time/Retired	Grid	Points
1	15	(France) Jean-Pierre Jabouille	Renault	M	54	1:26:15.73	2	9
2	27	(Australia) Alan Jones	Williams-Ford	G	54	+0.82 secs	3	6
3	28	(Argentina) Carlos Reutemann	Williams-Ford	G	54	+19.36 secs	4	4
4	26	(France) Jacques Laffite	Ligier-Ford	G	54	+42.02 secs	5	3
5	5	(Brazil) Nelson Piquet	Brabham-Ford	G	54	+1:02.81 secs	7	2
6	12	(Italy) Elio de Angelis	Lotus-Ford	G	54	+1:14.97 secs	9	1
7	8	(France) Alain Prost	McLaren-Ford	G	54	+1:33.41 secs	12	
8	2	(Canada) Gilles Villeneuve	Ferrari	M	53	+1 Lap	15	
9	16	(France) René Arnoux	Renault	M	53	+1 Lap	1	
10	6	(Mexico) Héctor Rebaque	Brabham-Ford	G	53	+1 Lap	14	
11	20	(Brazil) Emerson Fittipaldi	Fittipaldi-Ford	G	53	+1 Lap	23	
12	9	(Switzerland) Marc Surer	ATS-Ford	G	53	+1 Lap	16	
13	1	(South Africa) Jody Scheckter	Ferrari	M	53	+1 Lap	22	
14	29	(Italy) Riccardo Patrese	Arrows-Ford	G	53	+1 Lap	18	
15	50	(United Kingdom) Rupert Keegan	Williams-Ford	G	52	+2 Laps	20	
16	21	(Finland) Keke Rosberg	Fittipaldi-Ford	G	52	+2 Laps	11	
Ret	43	(United Kingdom) Nigel Mansell	Lotus-Ford	G	40	Engine	24	
Ret	7	(United Kingdom) John Watson	McLaren-Ford	G	34	Engine	21	
Ret	23	(Italy) Bruno Giacomelli	Alfa Romeo	G	28	Wheel	8	
Ret	25	(France) Didier Pironi	Ligier-Ford	G	25	Handling	6	
Ret	3	(France) Jean-Pierre Jarier	Tyrrell-Ford	G	25	Electrical	13	
Ret	31	(United States) Eddie Cheever	Osella-Ford	G	23	Wheel Bearing	19	
Ret	4	(Republic of Ireland) Derek Daly	Tyrrell-Ford	G	12	Brakes	10	
Ret	11	(United States) Mario Andretti	Lotus-Ford	G	6	Engine	17	
DNQ	14	(Netherlands) Jan Lammers	Ensign-Ford	G				
DNQ	30	(West Germany) Jochen Mass	Arrows-Ford	G		Driver Injured		

== Notes ==
- This was the Formula One World Championship debut for future World Champion Nigel Mansell.
- This was the 25th Grand Prix start for a Finnish driver.
- This was the 5th fastest lap set by Renault and a Renault-powered car.

== Championship standings after the race ==
Drivers' Championship standings

Pos	Driver	Points
1	(Australia) **Alan Jones***	47
2	(Brazil) **Nelson Piquet***	36
3	(Argentina) **Carlos Reutemann***	30
4	(France) **Jacques Laffite***	28
5	(France) **René Arnoux***	23

Constructors' Championship standings

Pos	Constructor	Points
1	(United Kingdom) **Williams-Ford***	77
2	(France) **Ligier-Ford***	51
3	(United Kingdom) Brabham-Ford	36
4	(France) Renault	32
5	(United Kingdom) Arrows-Ford	11

- Note: Only the top five positions are included for both sets of standings.
- Competitors in bold and marked with an asterisk still had a theoretical chance of becoming World Champion.

Previous race: 1980 German Grand Prix	FIA Formula One World Championship; 1980 season	Next race: 1980 Dutch Grand Prix
Previous race: 1979 Austrian Grand Prix	Austrian Grand Prix	Next race: 1981 Austrian Grand Prix
