= 1980 Italian Grand Prix =

- Race 12 of 14 in the 1980 Formula One season
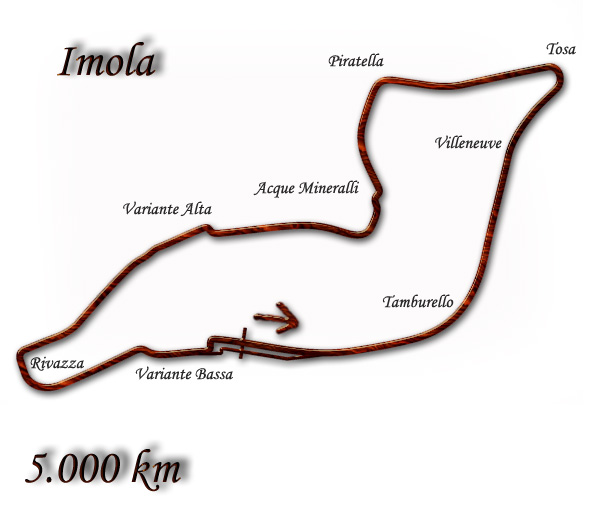

Race details
- Date: 14 September 1980
- Official name: 51º Gran Premio d'Italia
- Location: Autodromo Dino Ferrari; Imola, Emilia-Romagna, Italy
- Course: Permanent racing facility
- Course length: 5.000 km (3.107 miles)
- Distance: 60 laps, 300.000 km (186.411 miles)
- Weather: Sunny, Mild, Dry

Pole position
Driver	(France) René Arnoux	Renault
- Time: 1:33.988

Fastest lap
Driver	(Australia) Alan Jones	Williams-Ford
- Time: 1:36.089 on lap 47

Podium
First	(Brazil) Nelson Piquet	Brabham-Ford
Second	(Australia) Alan Jones	Williams-Ford
Third	(Argentina) Carlos Reutemann	Williams-Ford

The 1980 Italian Grand Prix was a Formula One motor race held on 14 September 1980 at the Autodromo Dino Ferrari in Imola, Italy. It was the twelfth race of the 1980 World Championship of F1 Drivers and the 1980 International Cup for F1 Constructors.

This was the first Formula One World Championship race to be held at Imola (the circuit having hosted the non-championship Dino Ferrari Grand Prix the previous year). It was the only Italian Grand Prix since 1948 not to be held at Monza, which was undergoing refurbishment at the time. The event would return to Monza in 1981, but Imola would remain on the F1 calendar until 2006, hosting the San Marino Grand Prix, and the Emilia Romagna Grand Prix from 2020 to 2025.

The race was held over 60 laps of the 5-kilometre (3.1 mi) circuit for a total race distance of 300 kilometres (186.4 mi).

The race was won by Brazilian driver Nelson Piquet, driving a Brabham-Ford. Piquet won by nearly half a minute from Australian driver Alan Jones, driving a Williams-Ford, with Jones' Argentine team-mate Carlos Reutemann third. The win was Piquet's third of the season and second in succession, and it gave him the lead of the Drivers' Championship by one point from Jones.

Manfred Winkelhock made his debut, substituting for the injured Jochen Mass at Arrows. A collision with Nigel Mansell's Lotus during qualifying resulted in both drivers failing to make the grid. Ferrari debuted their first turbo car, the 126C, but Gilles Villeneuve started the race in his regular 312T5. Regardless, after a heavy crash in practice at the flat-out right hander before Tosa, reigning World Champion Jody Scheckter announced his retirement from the sport.

The front row of the grid was occupied by the Renaults of René Arnoux and Jean-Pierre Jabouille, although Piquet led by lap 4 and was never headed. On lap 6, Villeneuve crashed his Ferrari heavily at the corner which now bears his name, following a puncture. Villeneuve escaped unhurt, but the incident also caused the retirement of Bruno Giacomelli, who ran over some of the debris in his Alfa Romeo. Jones moved up to second on lap 29 after running as low as seventh. Behind Reutemann, Elio de Angelis finished fourth in his Lotus, with Keke Rosberg fifth in his Fittipaldi and Didier Pironi sixth in his Ligier.

Jones' and Reutemann's podium finishes enabled the Williams team to secure their first Constructors' Championship with two races remaining.

== Classification ==
=== Qualifying ===
Pos	No.	Driver	Team	Time	Gap
1	16	(France) René Arnoux	Renault	1:33.988	-
2	15	(France) Jean-Pierre Jabouille	Renault	1:34.339	+ 0.351
3	28	(Argentina) Carlos Reutemann	Williams-Ford	1:34.686	+ 0.698
4	23	(Italy) Bruno Giacomelli	Alfa Romeo	1:34.912	+ 0.924
5	5	(Brazil) Nelson Piquet	Brabham-Ford	1:34.960	+ 0.972
6	27	(Australia) Alan Jones	Williams-Ford	1:35.109	+ 1.121
7	29	(Italy) Riccardo Patrese	Arrows-Ford	1:35.618	+ 1.630
8	2	(Canada) Gilles Villeneuve	Ferrari	1:35.751	+ 1.763
9	6	(Mexico) Héctor Rebaque	Brabham-Ford	1:35.872	+ 1.884
10	11	(United States) Mario Andretti	Lotus-Ford	1:36.084	+ 2.096
11	21	(Finland) Keke Rosberg	Fittipaldi-Ford	1:36.091	+ 2.103
12	3	(France) Jean-Pierre Jarier	Tyrrell-Ford	1:36.181	+ 2.193
13	25	(France) Didier Pironi	Ligier-Ford	1:36.422	+ 2.434
14	7	(United Kingdom) John Watson	McLaren-Ford	1:36.450	+ 2.462
15	20	(Brazil) Emerson Fittipaldi	Fittipaldi-Ford	1:36.758	+ 2.770
16	1	(South Africa) Jody Scheckter	Ferrari	1:36.827	+ 2.839
17	31	(United States) Eddie Cheever	Osella-Ford	1:36.884	+ 2.896
18	12	(Italy) Elio de Angelis	Lotus-Ford	1:36.919	+ 2.931
19	22	(Italy) Vittorio Brambilla	Alfa Romeo	1:36.929	+ 2.941
20	26	(France) Jacques Laffite	Ligier-Ford	1:36.972	+ 2.984
21	50	(United Kingdom) Rupert Keegan	Williams-Ford	1:37.169	+ 3.181
22	4	(Republic of Ireland) Derek Daly	Tyrrell-Ford	1:37.215	+ 3.227
23	9	(Switzerland) Marc Surer	ATS-Ford	1:37.270	+ 3.282
24	8	(France) Alain Prost	McLaren-Ford	1:37.284	+ 3.296
25	43	(United Kingdom) Nigel Mansell	Lotus-Ford	1:37.661	+ 3.673
26	30	(Germany) Manfred Winkelhock	Arrows-Ford	1:38.212	+ 4.224
27	14	(Netherlands) Jan Lammers	Ensign-Ford	1:38.215	+ 4.227
28	41	(United Kingdom) Geoff Lees	Ensign-Ford	1:38.451	+ 4.463

=== Race ===
Pos	No	Driver	Constructor	Tyre	Laps	Time/Retired	Grid	Points
1	5	(Brazil) Nelson Piquet	Brabham-Ford	G	60	1:38:07.52	5	9
2	27	(Australia) Alan Jones	Williams-Ford	G	60	+ 28.93	6	6
3	28	(Argentina) Carlos Reutemann	Williams-Ford	G	60	+ 1:13.67	3	4
4	12	(Italy) Elio de Angelis	Lotus-Ford	G	59	+ 1 Lap	18	3
5	21	(Finland) Keke Rosberg	Fittipaldi-Ford	G	59	+ 1 Lap	11	2
6	25	(France) Didier Pironi	Ligier-Ford	G	59	+ 1 Lap	13	1
7	8	(France) Alain Prost	McLaren-Ford	G	59	+ 1 Lap	24	
8	1	(South Africa) Jody Scheckter	Ferrari	MI	59	+ 1 Lap	16	
9	26	(France) Jacques Laffite	Ligier-Ford	G	59	+ 1 Lap	20	
10	16	(France) René Arnoux	Renault	MI	58	+ 2 Laps	1	
11	50	(United Kingdom) Rupert Keegan	Williams-Ford	G	58	+ 2 Laps	21	
12	31	(United States) Eddie Cheever	Osella-Ford	G	57	+ 3 Laps	17	
13	3	(France) Jean-Pierre Jarier	Tyrrell-Ford	G	54	Brakes	12	
Ret	15	(France) Jean-Pierre Jabouille	Renault	MI	53	Gearbox	2	
Ret	9	(Switzerland) Marc Surer	ATS-Ford	G	45	Engine	23	
Ret	11	(United States) Mario Andretti	Lotus-Ford	G	40	Engine	10	
Ret	29	(Italy) Riccardo Patrese	Arrows-Ford	G	38	Engine	7	
Ret	4	(Republic of Ireland) Derek Daly	Tyrrell-Ford	G	33	Accident	22	
Ret	7	(United Kingdom) John Watson	McLaren-Ford	G	20	Wheel Bearing	14	
Ret	6	(Mexico) Héctor Rebaque	Brabham-Ford	G	18	Suspension	9	
Ret	20	(Brazil) Emerson Fittipaldi	Fittipaldi-Ford	G	17	Accident	15	
Ret	2	(Canada) Gilles Villeneuve	Ferrari	MI	5	Puncture	8	
Ret	23	(Italy) Bruno Giacomelli	Alfa Romeo	G	5	Puncture	4	
Ret	22	(Italy) Vittorio Brambilla	Alfa Romeo	G	4	Spun Off	19	
DNQ	43	(United Kingdom) Nigel Mansell	Lotus-Ford	G				
DNQ	30	(West Germany) Manfred Winkelhock	Arrows-Ford	G				
DNQ	14	(Netherlands) Jan Lammers	Ensign-Ford	G				
DNQ	41	(United Kingdom) Geoff Lees	Ensign-Ford	G				

== Championship standings after the race ==
Drivers' Championship standings

	Pos	Driver	Points
1	1	(Brazil) **Nelson Piquet***	54
1	2	(Australia) **Alan Jones***	53
	3	(Argentina) Carlos Reutemann	37
	4	(France) Jacques Laffite	32
	5	(France) René Arnoux	29

Constructors' Championship standings

Pos	Constructor	Points
1	(United Kingdom) **Williams-Ford**	90
2	(France) Ligier-Ford	56
3	(United Kingdom) Brabham-Ford	54
4	(France) Renault	38
5	(United Kingdom) Tyrrell-Ford	12

- Note: Only the top five positions are included for both sets of standings.
- **Bold text** indicates the 1980 World Constructors' Champion.
- Competitors in bold and marked with an asterisk still had a theoretical chance of becoming World Champion.

Previous race: 1980 Dutch Grand Prix	FIA Formula One World Championship; 1980 season	Next race: 1980 Canadian Grand Prix
Previous race: 1979 Italian Grand Prix	Italian Grand Prix	Next race: 1981 Italian Grand Prix; Next race at Imola: 1981 San Marino Grand Prix
Awards
Preceded by 1979 Italian Grand Prix	Formula One Promotional Trophy for Race Promoter; 1980	Succeeded by 1981 Caesars Palace Grand Prix
