= Robert Lang filmography =

The Robert Lang filmography lists the film and television appearances of English actor Robert Lang.

== Film ==
Year	Title	Role	Notes
1963	Uncle Vanya	Yefim	
1965	Catch Us If You Can	Whiting	Uncredited
1965	Othello	Roderigo	
1966	The Sandwich Man	Waiter	
1968	Interlude	Humphrey Turnbull	
1969	Twenty-Nine	Peter	
1969	The Dance of Death	Kurt	
1969	A Walk with Love and Death	Pilgrim Leader	
1971	The House That Dripped Blood	Psychiatrist - Andrews	Segment 1: "Method for Murder"
1972	Savage Messiah	Major Boyle	
1973	The MacKintosh Man	Jack Summers	
1973	Night Watch	Mr. Appleby	
1974	Ransom	Martin Shepard	(Voice) Uncredited
1976	Shout at the Devil	Captain Henry	
1978	The Medusa Touch	Pennington	
1979	The First Great Train Robbery	Sharp	
1983	Runners	The Swimming Pool - Wilkins	
1988	Hawks	Walter Bancroft	
1993	The Trial	K's Uncle	
1993	Genghis Cohn	Police Chief	
1994	Four Weddings and a Funeral	Lord Hibbott - Wedding Two	
1996	Some Mother's Son	Government Minister	
1997	Wilde	C.O. Humphreys	
2000	Room to Rent	Mark's Father	
2005	Mrs. Palfrey at the Claremont	Mr. Osborne	Final film role Posthumous release Dedicated in memory

== Television ==
Year	Title	Role	Notes
1948	The Only Way	Uncredited	TV film
1958	The Castiglioni Brothers	Nico	TV film
1959	BBC Sunday-Night Theatre	Lancelot Budd	Episode: "Farewell My City"
1959	Saturday Playhouse	George Fentrill	Episode: "Last Day in Dreamland"
1959	The Case of Private Hamp	Captain O'Sullivan, the Medical Officer	TV film
1960	An Age of Kings	Sir Pierce of Exton	1 Episode
1960	An Age of Kings	Sheriff	1 Episode
1960	An Age of Kings	Lord Hastings	2 episodes
1960	An Age of Kings	Montjoy, the French Herald	2 episodes
1960	An Age of Kings	Henry Beaufort, Bishop of Winchester	1 Episode
1960	An Age of Kings	Cardinal Beaufort. Bishop of Winchester	2 episodes
1960	An Age of Kings	Uncredited	1 Episode
1960	An Age of Kings	Earl of Oxford	1 Episode
1960	An Age of Kings	Murderer	1 Episode
1960	An Age of Kings	Sir Thomas Vaughan	1 Episode
1961	People of Nowhere	Second German	TV film
1961	Dixon of Dock Green	Jacko	Episode: "George Takes a Bowler"
1962	ITV Television Playhouse	Fred	Episode: "The Pinkness of It All"
1963	Emergency – Ward 10	Dr. Lewis Griffiths	16 episodes
1964	Armchair Theatre	Bill Hemmings	Episode: "The Cherry on Top"
1966	Knock on Any Door	John Casson	Episode: "The Diary of Mr. Casson"
1966	ITV Play of the Week	Karnoski	Episode: "The East Wind"
1967	Armchair Theatre	Wilf	Episode: "Compensation Alice"
1967	A Flea in Her Ear	Victor Emmanuel Chandebise / Poche	BBC TV film of the 1966 National Theatre production
1967	Callan	Bauer	Episode: "Goodness Burns Too Bright"
1970	ITV Sunday Night Theatre	Peter Holiday	Mrs. Mouse, Are You Within?
1970	The Troubleshooters	Sid Carver	That's Africa Baby
1970	Menace	Michael Grant	Man with a Mission
1971	Thirty-Minute Theatre	Minister	Faith
1971	Out of the Unknown	Adam Crosse	Deathday
1971	Armchair Theatre	Arthur Jones	The Bargain Hunters
1971	The Rivals of Sherlock Holmes	Bernard Sutton	The Ripening Rubies
1973	And No One Could Save Her	Beck	TV film
1973	Play for Today	Edward Morris	Edward G: Like the Filmstar
1974	Dial M for Murder	Drew	Contract
1974	Thriller	The Man	Episode: "I'm the Girl He Wants to Kill"
1974	Microbes and Men	Semmelweis	The Invisible Enemy
1974	Notorious Woman	Michel de Bourges	Trial
1975	Churchill's People	Hugh Goodrest	The Whip of Heaven
1975	Centre Play	Robert	The Stick Insect
1976	The New Avengers	Felix Kane	The Last of the Cybernauts...?
1977	Raffles	Count Corbucci	The Last Laugh
1977	Jubilee	Wallace Jones	An Hour in the Life...
1977	Rogue Male	Jessel	TV film
1977	BBC Play of the Month	Russell Blackborough	Waste
1977-1978	1990	Herbert Skardon	16 episodes
1978	ITV Playhouse	Plunkett	Last Wishes
1979	Matilda's England	Mr. Madden	2 episodes
1979	Chalk and Cheese	Narrator	6 episodes
1979	Rumpole of the Bailey	Captain Rex Parkin	Rumpole and the Fascist Beast
1979	Last of the Summer Wine	The Commodore	The Flag and Further Snags
1980	Donkeys' Years	David Buckle	TV film
1980	For Maddie with Love	Jack Burrows	1 Episode
1980	Tales of the Unexpected	Arthur	The Orderly World of Mr. Appleby
1980	Premiere	Insp. Hammond	Braces High
1981	West End Tales	Attorney General	The Tooth Fairy
1982	The Brack Report	Harold Harlan	9 episodes
1983	King Lear	Albany	TV film
1983	Shackleton	Major Darwin	2 episodes
1983	Heartattack Hotel	Smallpiece	TV film
1984	Sharing Time	Nigel	Guilt on the Gingerbread
1984	Hammer House of Mystery and Suspense	Detective Sergeant Wells	The Sweet Scent of Death
1984	The Glory Boys	Fairclough	1 Episode
1985	Tenko Reunion	Teddy Forster-Brown	1 Episode
1985	Theatre Night	The Pastor	Lady Windermere's Fan
1985	Theatre Night	Lord Augustus Lorton	The Father
1986	Harem	Ambassador Grant	TV film
1986	The Theban Plays by Sophocles	Chorus	Antigone
1986	Inside Story	Lord Bayswater	In the Public Interest
1986	Agatha Christie's Miss Marple: The Murder at the Vicarage	Colonel Protheroe	TV film
1986	Screenplay	Bank Manager	Daylight Robbery
1987	Theatre Night	Petey Bowles	The Birthday Party
1987	Vanity Fair	Mr. Osborne	6 episodes
1987	Boon	Sillitoe	Special Delivery
1988	The Contract	Deputy Under Secretary	1 Episode
1988	Inspector Morse	Chief Superintendent Dewar	The Settling of the Sun
1988	A Very Peculiar Practice	Lord Thickthorn	The Big Squeeze
1988	A Gentleman's Club	Eliot	A Question of Er...
1989	The Dog It Was That Died	Arlon	TV film
1989	Screenplay	Strafe	Beyond the Pale
1989	Confessional	Brigadier Charles Ferguson	4 episodes
1989	Prince Caspian and the Voyage of the Dawn Treader	King Miraz	2 episodes
1990	Campion	John Barnabas	2 episodes
1990	Who Bombed Birmingham?	Detective Superintendent Ibison	TV film
1990	Coasting	Sir Howard Nash	Press Stud
1991	Parnell and the Englishwoman	Mr. Gladstone	4 episodes
1991	Devices and Desires	Jonah the Tramp	1 Episode
1991	Ashenden	Sir Timothy Semple	The Hairless Mexican
1992	The Darling Buds of May	Captain Broadbent	Oh! To Be in England: Part 1
1992	The Old Boy Network	Sir Roland White	6 episodes
1992	Anglo Saxon Attitudes	Professor Clun	3 episodes
1992	Boon	Geoffrey Jackson	Blackballed
1993	Tracey Ullman: A Class Act	Uncredited	TV film
1993	Alleyn Mysteries	General Halcut-Hackett	Death in a White Tie
1993	The Return of the Borrowers	Mr. Platter	2 episodes
1994	Under the Hammer	Lord Holloway	7 episodes
1994	Anna Lee	David Lambert	The Cook's Tale
1994	Ellington	Robinson	TV film
1995	The Tomorrow People	Hubert Tate	5 episodes
1995	Mike & Angelo	Mr. Guthrie	Happy Families
1996	Rasputin	Protopopov	TV film
1996	Bramwell	Lord Palfrey	1 Episode
1996	In Suspicious Circumstances	Frank Lindo	The Monster of Reading
1997	The Jasper Carrott Trial	The Judge	2 episodes
1997	A Dance to the Music of Time	Leonard Short	Post War
1998	Mosley	Lord Curzon	Young Man in a Hurry
1998	Our Mutual Friend	Mr. Tremlow	3 episodes
1998	Norman Ormal: A Very Political Turtle	Panellist	TV film
1998	Cider with Rosie	The Squire	TV film
1998-1999	Kavanagh QC	Mr. Justice Benson	2 episodes
1999	Nancherrow	Jerry Pinch	2 episodes
2000	Trust	Nathan Anderson	TV film
2001	Midsomer Murders	Woody Pope	Episode: "Destroying Angel"
2002	The Forsyte Saga	Swithin	4 episodes
2002	The Bill	Mr. Finch	1 Episode
2002	Heartbeat	Colonel Barber	Bread and Circuses
2003	Looking for Victoria	Lord Halifax	TV film
