= Alexis Kanner =

French-born Canadian actor (1942–2003)

- Kanner in The Prisoner: "Living in Harmony" (1967)
- Born: Henri Alex Kanner; 2 May 1942; Bagnères-de-Luchon, France
- Died: 13 December 2003 (aged 61); London, England
- Other names: Henry Leroy, Henri Lucas
- Occupations: Actor, Director

Alexis Kanner (born Henri Alex Kanner; 2 May 1942 – 13 December 2003) was a French-born Canadian film and television actor, based in England, best known for his appearances in the cult 1960s TV series The Prisoner.

== Life and career ==
Henri Alex Kanner was born in Nazi-occupied Bagnères-de-Luchon, France, to a Jewish family. In April 1944, shortly before his second birthday, he escaped with his family to Montreal, Canada, on the Portuguese ship Serpa Pinto. Kanner attended the Montreal Children's Theatre under the tutelage of Dorothy Davis and Violet Walters.

Kanner made his first impression as an actor in the role of Alex, among a French Canadian cast, in the television drama series Beau Temps, Mauvais Temps (1955–1958).

He moved to England in the late 1950s to join the Birmingham Repertory Theatre to further his acting career. This led to the Royal Court and the Royal Shakespeare Company where he played in The Tempest in 1961 and the lead role in Hamlet under the direction of Peter Brook in 1965. His earliest UK television appearance appears to have been as Peter in the Sunday Night Theatre play Echo From Afar in 1959.

He appeared as Stephen in the film Reach for Glory (1962) about the brutal war games of evacuated teenage boys during the Second World War. This led to his first meeting with the film's assistant director David Tomblin, who would a few years later be the producer of The Prisoner series.

He had a small role in the comedy film We Joined the Navy (1962) playing Gerrett. The only real notable thing about the film was the number of future British small screen comedy stalwarts who were acting in either similar small roles or uncredited cameos.

Other plays in which he performed were:

- ITV Play of the Week: Birds in the Wilderness as Peter (1962) and The Facing Chair (1963) as Clem Goodwin
- Television Playhouse: The Interview as The Young Man (1962) and Along Came A Spider as Brian (1963)
- Drama '63: The Freewheelers as Jeremy (1963)
- Armchair Theatre: Living Image (1963) as John Manders playing a son who wonders if he can love his father even though he violently disapproves of everything he stands for

He appeared on British television in an episode of The Saint, "The Ever Loving Spouse" (1964) as Alec Misner and in the first of three episodes in ATV's Love Story, A Future Holiday as Frank Watkins. His other appearances in that series were in the following year in Briefly Kiss The Loser as Big Silver Gardner and in 1967 as Colin Turner in Cinéma Vérité. He appeared as Detective Constable Matt Stone in 9 episodes of Softly, Softly (BBC, 1966), a spin-off series from Z-Cars. He claimed in interviews later that he left not wanting to be typecast. Only one complete Softly, Softly episode featuring Kanner survives in the BBC archives, 'A-Z' (broadcast 30 March 1966), and another partially.

His film career continued with an appearance in The Amorous Adventures of Moll Flanders (1965) as part of a Mohocks gang.

In 1967 he returned to Montreal to star as the lead character Ernie Turner in the film The Ernie Game which was written and directed by Don Owen for the National Film Board of Canada.

=== The Prisoner ===
Kanner's performances in the 1967–1968 British television series The Prisoner brought lasting recognition for his acting. When he was first enrolled, Patrick McGoohan, the star and co-creator of the series, was planning the final four episodes. There was some opposition to the choice, but McGoohan was looking to cast the rebellious and maverick qualities that Kanner displayed. His first guest-star role was in the mock Wild West episode "Living in Harmony", in which he portrayed the "Kid" (the alter-ego of Number Eight), a violent mute dressed in circus trousers and a top hat, who is eventually shot in a duel by McGoohan's character, Number Six. McGoohan was impressed by his acting skills and perfectionism (to prepare the duel scene, both actors practised quick-draw assiduously). As a result, McGoohan wrote for Kanner the role of Number Forty-eight, who is made to stand trial as the representative of rebellious youth in "Fall Out", the final episode of the series. Additionally, Kanner gave an uncredited performance as the photographer in the fairy tale episode "The Girl Who Was Death", in which he performed a number of stunts on a roller coaster.

=== Later career ===
In 1969, he starred as Graham Baird in the little-known short feature film Twenty Nine, a story of a promiscuous young husband's night out in swinging London. It was only 26 minutes long and co-starred Yootha Joyce. This was shown as the B film in Britain with the feature film if..... The band Tuesday's Children, who had a cameo role in a nightclub scene, released the song "She" that they played in the film as a single soon afterwards.

He starred in a number of feature films soon after, including Crossplot (1969) with Roger Moore, Connecting Rooms (1970) with Bette Davis and Michael Redgrave, and Goodbye Gemini (also 1970).

He is wrongly credited with appearing in Invasion:UFO in 1972, a compilation film made up of the episodes from the television series UFO made in 1970. He had appeared in an episode called The Cat with Ten Lives but no footage of this was used in the feature film.

He moved back to Canada and his next film was Mahoney's Last Stand (released in the US as Mahoney's Estate, 1972) with Sam Waterston and Maud Adams, which he also co-wrote and co-directed.

He worked again with Patrick McGoohan on the Canadian hostage drama film Kings and Desperate Men, in which he starred as well as writing, producing and directing. He apparently spent two years editing the film which, although filmed in December 1977, did not premiere until the 1981 Montreal World Film Festival. During the late 80s Kanner sued the producers of the film Die Hard claiming that they stole the idea for that movie from this film; he lost the suit.

His final known acting role was in Nightfall (released in 1988), a science-fiction film based on the Isaac Asimov story of the same name.

He settled back in London in 1996 and was working on a new film project called J R Profitt that never came to fruition.

=== Death ===
Kanner died of a heart attack at his London home on 13 December 2003, aged 61. He had requested that his body be buried in Jerusalem, Israel, at the Mount of Olives.

== Filmography ==
- Reach for Glory (1962)
- We Joined the Navy (1962)
- The Amorous Adventures of Moll Flanders (1965)
- The Ernie Game (1967)
- Crossplot (1969)
- Twenty-Nine (1969)
- Connecting Rooms (1970)
- Goodbye Gemini (1970)
- Mahoney's Last Stand (1972)
- Kings and Desperate Men (Shot in 1977, released in 1981)
- Nightfall (1988)
