= Fittipaldi F6 =

Fittipaldi F6/F6A
- Category: Formula One
- Constructor: Fittipaldi Automotive
- Designer: Ralph Bellamy
- Predecessor: Fittipaldi F5A
- Successor: Fittipaldi F7

Technical specifications
- Chassis: Aluminium alloy monocoque
- Suspension (front): Double wishbones, coil springs
- Suspension (rear): Double wishbones, coil springs
- Axle track: F: 1,524 mm (60.0 in); R: 1,575 mm (62.0 in)
- Wheelbase: 2,780 mm (109 in)
- Engine: Ford Cosworth DFV 2,993 cc (182.6 cu in) V8 naturally aspirated, mid-mounted
- Transmission: Hewland FGA 400 5-speed manual
- Weight: 582 kg (1,283 lb)
- Fuel: Shell
- Tyres: Goodyear

Competition history
- Notable entrants: Fittipaldi Automotive
- Notable drivers: (Brazil) Emerson Fittipaldi
- Debut: 1979 South African Grand Prix
Races	Wins	Poles	F/Laps
7	0	0	0
- Constructors' Championships: 0
- Drivers' Championships: 0
- Unless otherwise stated, all data refer to Formula One World Championship Grands Prix only.

The Fittipaldi F6 was a Formula One car designed by Ralph Bellamy and used by Fittipaldi Automotive in the 1979 Formula One season. The engine was a Ford Cosworth DFV, and the car was driven by Brazilian Emerson Fittipaldi but achieved no points during the season. The car was modified to become the F6A, used later in 1979 and was succeeded by the Fittipaldi F7.

== Racing History ==
The F6 made its debut at the 1979 South African Grand Prix with Brazilian driver and team co-owner Emerson Fittipaldi who finished 13th. The team entered the F5A because the F6 was being updated into the F6A. It was next seen in Germany but the Brazilian retired with an electrical fault. The Austrian Grand Prix saw Fittipaldi retire with brake failure. At Holland the Brazilian retired with an electrical fault. The Italian Grand Prix saw Fittipaldi finish eighth. The Brazilian finished eighth at Canada where the team hired another Brazilian, Alex Ribeiro who failed to qualify. The United States Grand Prix East saw Fittipaldi finish seventh and Ribeiro fail to qualify. The F6A was replaced by the Fittipaldi F7 (a 1979 Wolf WR7).

Fittipaldi finished the season in twelfth place in the Constructors' Championship with one point which had been scored by the F5A.

== Complete Formula One World Championship results ==
(key)

Year	Entrants	Engines	Tyres	Drivers	1	2	3	4	5	6	7	8	9	10	11	12	13	14	15	Points	WCC
1979	Fittipaldi Automotive	Ford Cosworth DFV 3.0 V8	G		ARG	BRA	RSA	USW	ESP	BEL	MON	FRA	GBR	GER	AUT	NED	ITA	CAN	USE	1^{1}	12th^{1}
1979	Fittipaldi Automotive	Ford Cosworth DFV 3.0 V8	G	Emerson Fittipaldi			13							Ret	Ret	Ret	8	8	7	1^{1}	12th^{1}
1979	Fittipaldi Automotive	Ford Cosworth DFV 3.0 V8	G	Alex Ribeiro														DNQ	DNQ	1^{1}	12th^{1}

^1 1 point scored using the Fittipaldi F5A.
