= Suzy Miller =

British model, dancer and choreographer

- Born: Susan Miller c. 1949 (age 76–77)
- Other name: Susan Hunt
- Occupations: Model; dancer
- Spouses: James Hunt (m. 1974; div. 1976) Richard Burton (m. 1976; div. 1983) Jack Cawood (after 1983)

Susan Miller (born c. 1949) is a British model, dancer, and choreographer. She has acted in several films such as Twenty Nine (1969) and The Wild Geese (1978). Miller gained notoriety for being married to Formula 1 race driver James Hunt (in 1974), and leaving him for Richard Burton in 1976.

== Biography ==
Miller grew up in Southern Rhodesia (modern Zimbabwe) and elsewhere in Africa, with her expatriate parents, her twin sister Vivienne, and her brother John. Her father, Frederick Miller, was a British Army officer and later a barrister and judge, including in Kenya. The family eventually moved to Basingstoke, Hampshire, while Miller and her siblings moved to London.

By the age of 24, she was a successful fashion model in Britain. She was known for being one of the "beautiful people" and for getting easily whatever she wanted.

In 1974, she met James Hunt in Spain. He proposed to her only weeks later, and they were married on October 18, 1974 at Brompton Oratory. The couple were considered "one of the sporting world's most happily married couples." The couple spent their honeymoon in Antigua with one of Hunt's close friends, also newly married, and then settled in Spain for tax reasons. Later, Miller described feeling that Hunt's career came ahead of everything else in his life. He was also frequently unfaithful and the marriage floundered.

In December 1975, the actor Richard Burton met Suzy Miller at a Swiss ski resort and invited her to return to New York with him. Their relationship developed quickly and Burton left Elizabeth Taylor for Miller. Miller claimed that part of the reason she initially became involved with Burton was so that she could make Hunt jealous. As Suzy Miller and James Hunt's marriage ended, Burton reportedly paid Suzy Miller a $1 million settlement that would otherwise have been James Hunt's financial obligation to her. Miller divorced Hunt in Haiti in June 1976. Burton and Miller married on August 21, 1976 in Arlington, Virginia.

During their marriage, Miller was reported to be jealous of Burton's ex-wife Taylor. An interesting anecdote involves Miller's jealous insistence that, while Burton was appearing in a revival of Camelot in Toronto, a page from the program displaying an advertisement of Taylor's jewelry line must be removed from every copy or Burton would not go on. The theatre's staff removed the offending page from thousands of copies of the program.

In 1981, Burton underwent major surgery for a degenerative spinal condition; his health, and the couple's marriage, subsequently declined. The marriage between Burton and Miller ended in divorce. As part of her own divorce settlement from Burton—separate from the $1 million he had earlier paid on James Hunt's behalf—Miller received $1 million and the couple's holiday home in Puerto Vallarta, Mexico. The divorce was settled in Haiti in early 1983, as Burton's 1976 divorce from Taylor had been. Following the divorce, Miller settled in California.

Miller married a third time, to American millionaire Jack Cawood, a real estate developer in Puerto Vallarta, and the couple moved to the United States.

=== Film portrayal ===
Ron Howard's 2013 film Rush recounts the intrigues surrounding her former husband, Hunt, with the role of Miller being played by Olivia Wilde. Wilde said she had not met Miller, who was living in Ibiza at the time, nor had Miller seen the finished film; Ron Howard instructed Wilde not to attempt an impression of Miller, given the lack of available reference material.

== Filmography ==
=== Acting roles ===
- Twenty Nine (1969) as Priscilla
- The Wild Geese (1978) as Egyptian girl flirting with Faulkner
