= Kings and Desperate Men =

- Theatrical release poster
- Directed by: Alexis Kanner
- Written by: Edmund Ward; Alexis Kanner
- Produced by: Alexis Kanner
- Starring: Patrick McGoohan; Alexis Kanner; Margaret Trudeau; Andrea Marcovicci; Robin Spry; Budd Knapp; Jean-Pierre Brown
- Cinematography: Alexis Kanner; Paul Van der Linden
- Edited by: Alexis Kanner
- Music by: Pierre F. Brault; Michel Robidoux
- Distributed by: Magnum Entertainment
- Release dates: 1981 (Canada); 1983 (U.S.); 1984 (UK)
- Running time: 118 minutes
- Country: Canada
- Language: English
- Budget: 1.2 million

Kings and Desperate Men (also known as Kings and Desperate Men: A Hostage Incident) is a 1981 Canadian drama film directed and produced by Alexis Kanner and starring Patrick McGoohan, Margaret Trudeau, Kanner and Andrea Marcovicci. It was written by Edmund Ward and Kanner.

The story is set within one day and concerns a terrorist group who kidnap a radio presenter and his family.

== Plot ==
On Christmas Eve, a radio talk show host named John Kingsley, his wealthy wife, their son with learning difficulties, and a judge are taken hostage by a group of terrorists. The group demand a new trial on air for their convicted comrade, Robert McKenzie, who they believe was wrongly convicted of manslaughter for killing a police officer by negligent driving. The listeners are asked by the terrorists to act as the jury and telephone in their verdicts to the station.

The sentencing judge appears on Kingsley's show to defend the verdict, then is kidnapped from a party by a man posing as staff, who claims the judge's driver is indisposed. Kingsley is held hostage after inviting a young women who was waiting in his car back to his radio studio to drink cognac. A history lecturer named Lucas Miller brandishes a shotgun and demands that Kingsley broadcast live the next morning with Miller's account of McKenzie's miscarriage of justice. To ensure Kingsley's cooperation, his young son, wife, and housekeeper are held hostage by two of the group, with gelignite explosive wired to deter police entry. One is erratic, smashing ornaments, drinking, and threatening the boy, while the other is calm and tells the story of The Wind in the Willows to the child.

Kingsley and Miller verbally spar on air, Kingsley interrupting Miller's speech to advise him on correctly speaking into the microphone. The judge is made to call the show, but he refuses to discuss the case outside court. He trails off mid-sentence and dies of what is presumed to be a heart attack. Hearing the kidnappers say the judge is dead, Kingsley strangles Miller, only relenting when threatened by Miller's female accomplice.

Miller says the sentence of 15 years was excessive versus others for death by driving - ranging from suspended sentences to 18 months - and that the police fabricated evidence of the car being stolen and not roadworthy, which they promise to investigate. Miller speculates that the killed officer was on drugs or drunk. The officer's widow calls to say the only drugs he took were for asthma, which meant he could not drink. Swayed by her call, the kinder kidnapper tells Kingsley's wife to lock herself and her son in the bathroom before phoning to invite the police to raid the apartment. They free the hostages, but not before the drunken kidnapper has severely beaten the caller with the phone handset. The public calling in are also swayed, nearly all saying "Guilty". The police chief calls to say that there was evidence of police misconduct in the case, but a women student calls to say she was in the car and McKenzie killed the officer and McKenzie himself phones from jail to admit his guilt. The police announce one of the judge's kidnappers has died at a roadblock.

Miller, shaken, says those who died did so for a just cause, but Kingsley, thoroughly drunk after drinking throughout the broadcast, makes to leave the studio against Miller's protestations. Miller fires, the amplified shot echoing over the city, followed by screaming. Kingsley is however unharmed, telling his listeners, "The sound you heard was Mr Miller losing his head all over the walls of my studio". The police move in and Kingsley is reunited with wife.

== Cast ==
- Patrick McGoohan as John Kingsley
- Alexis Kanner as Lucas Miller
- Margaret Trudeau as Elizabeth Kingsley
- Budd Knapp as Judge Stephen McManus
- Andrea Marcovicci as Barbara
- Frank Moore as Pete Herrera
- Robin Spry as Harry Gibson
- Jean-Pierre Brown as Christopher Kingsley
- Kate Nash as Mrs. McPhearson
- Neil Vipond as Henry Sutton
- Dave Patrick as Grant Gillespie
- Kevin Fenlon as Laz
- August Schellenberg as Stanley Aldini
- Frederic Smith as Bolton
- Peter MacNeill as George
- Marcel Beaulieu as a member of the Special Squad
- Andre Koudsey as a member of the Special Squad
- Bob Lepage as a member of the Special Squad
- Normand Roy as a member of the Special Squad
- Andrew Theodoses as a member of the Special Squad

== Production ==
The movie was made on a budget of CA$1.2 million and was filmed in Montreal in 1977. Kanner spent two years editing the film.

The title is derived from a line in John Donne's poem "Death Be Not Proud" (Holy Sonnet X): "Thou art slave to Fate, Chance, kings, and desperate men."

The Gazette of Montreal (21 Jan 1978) wrote that McGoohan had taken over direction from Kanner.

Trudeau was the wife of 15th Canadian Prime Minister Pierre Trudeau, who was in office at the time of both the film's production and its eventual release. She is the mother of 23rd Canadian Prime Minister Justin Trudeau, who assumed office in November 2015.

In the late 1980s Kanner took legal action against the producers of Die Hard (1988), alleging that the producers stole their idea from Kings and Desperate Men. Kanner lost his case.

== Release ==
The movie was released in Canada on August 22, 1981 at the Montreal World Film Festival. It was released in the USA on November 13, 1983 at the Chicago International Film Festival (rated PG-13). It premiered in the UK at the London Film Festival in 1984.

== Reception ==
In The Monthly Film Bulletin Paul Taylor wrote: "Kings and Desperate Men trails tantalising hints that its thriller framework might once have possessed a pointed (Anglo-lrish?) political dimension before either production exigencies or the excesses of the 'personal' film-making ethos exerted a neutralising influence. But Alexis Kanner's feature film début now seems as out of place – set in an anonymous Canadian city – as it appears curiously out of time: shot in December 1977, screened at the Montreal Festival in 1981, and having matured none too well during its subsequent shelf-life. Modishly disjunctive editing and a multi-layered soundtrack aside, most of Kanner's ample energies (his multiple credits here include several under the pseudonym of Henry Lucas) have all too clearly been expended on setting the stage for an epic of relentless verbal sparring. ... the key performances of Kanner and Patrick McGoohan are sliced thick enough to take in several self-amused layers of an involved private joke."

Variety wrote: "Kings And Desperate Men is a confusing thriller with a hostage setting which has received considerable attention thanks to the participation of Margaret Trudeau. The film, shot in December, 1977, was hardly worth the near four-year wait. The long gestation period between conception and release does not reflect in the movie's craftsmanship. The pace, narrative and jerky editing style compound the facile, ill-conceived multi-layered plot. ... Kanner directed and co-wrote the screenplay in addition to taking a leading role. His personal supervision throughout has resulted in a production interesting for curiosity sake solely. The entire production is wildly out of control with little hope of commercial success beyond exploitation dates."

In The Radio Times Guide to Films David Parkinson gave the film 1/5 stars, writing: "The presence of Margaret Trudeau is the only noteworthy aspect of this sloppy kidnap drama. But the former Canadian prime minister's ex-wife takes a back seat as her husband (Patrick McGoohan) is held hostage on his talk radio show by a gang of rookie terrorists. Fleetingly, at the start of the siege, this threatens to become gripping. Then McGoohan begins chomping on the scenery, and the dual ineptitude of Alexis Kanner's acting and direction becomes clear."

In The Hollywood Reporter Arthur Knight wrote: "Style is the essence of Kings and Desperate Men ... Kanner's script is rich in ironies and sophisticated verbal parries, all of which the urbane McGoohan plays to the hilt. But if the verbal bouts are often dizzying, Kanner's camera moves and editing are even more so – almost perverse in their laconic, elliptic avoidance of the obvious. ... [the fiilm] has a lot more going for it than most thrillers. It's fascinating to watch, and every bit as compelling to listen to. – "

== Home media ==
The movie was issued on VHS in 1989.
