= Wolf WR7 =

Wolf WR7 Fittipaldi F7
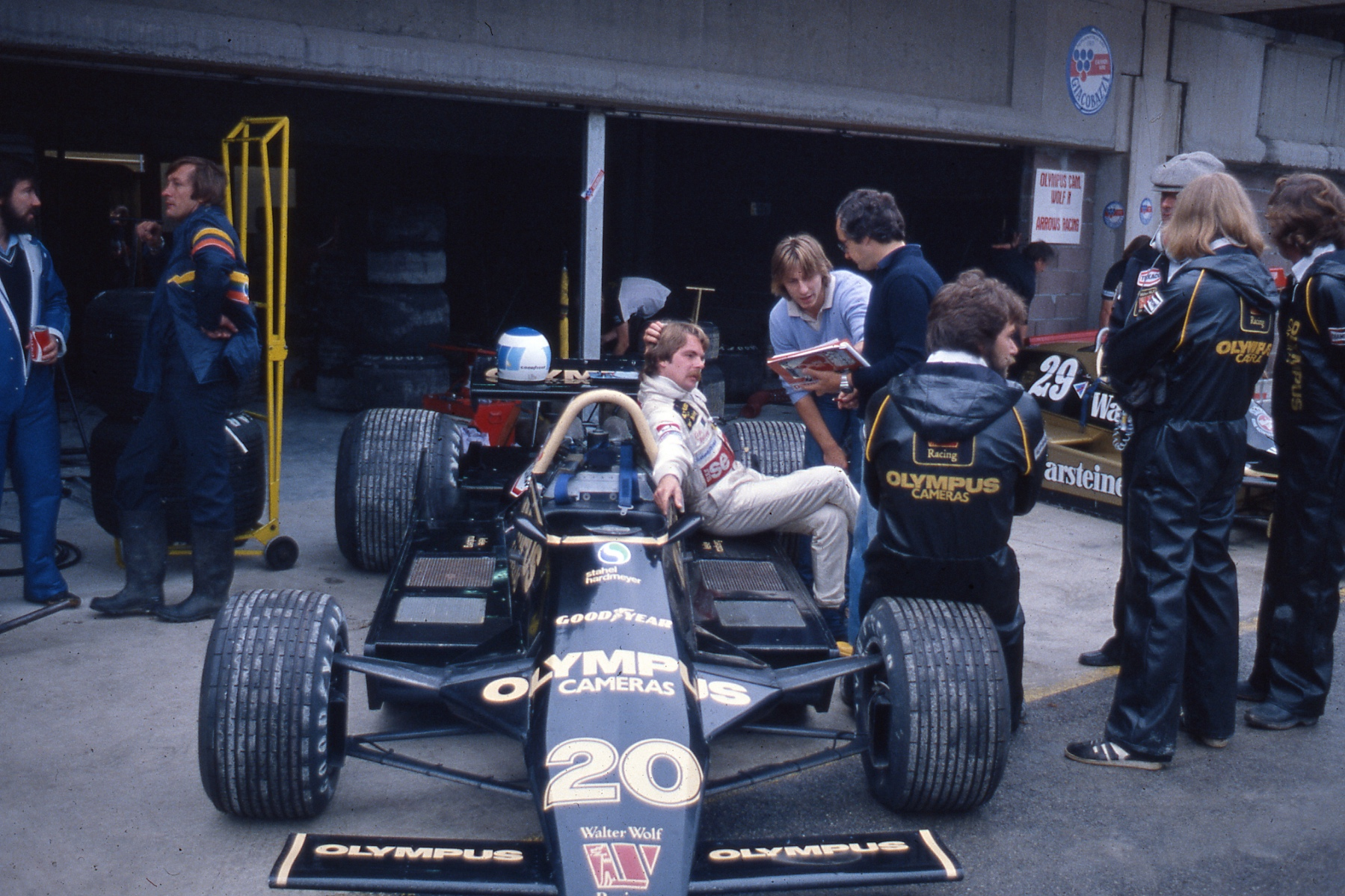
- Keke Rosberg with his Wolf WR7 at Imola in 1979
- Category: Formula One
- Constructor: Wolf/Fittipaldi
- Designer: Harvey Postlethwaite
- Predecessor: Wolf WR5/6 (Wolf); Fittipaldi F6A (Fittipaldi)
- Successor: Fittipaldi F8

Technical specifications
- Chassis: Aluminium monocoque, with engine as a fully stressed member.
- Axle track: Front: 1979: 1,626 mm (64.0 in); 1980: 1,778 mm (70.0 in); Rear: 1,626 mm (64.0 in)
- Wheelbase: 1979: 2,667 mm (105.0 in); 1980: 2,642 mm (104.0 in)
- Engine: Ford Cosworth DFV 2,993 cc (182.6 cu in) 90° V8, naturally aspirated, mid-mounted.
- Transmission: Hewland FGA 400 5-speed manual gearbox, with Borg & Beck clutch.
- Tyres: Goodyear

Competition history
- Notable entrants: Walter Wolf Racing; Skol Fittipaldi Team
- Notable drivers: (United Kingdom) James Hunt (Finland) Keke Rosberg (Brazil) Emerson Fittipaldi
- Debut: 1979 Argentine Grand Prix
Races	Wins	Poles	F/Laps
23	0	0	0
- Unless otherwise stated, all data refer to Formula One World Championship Grands Prix only.

The Wolf WR7 was a Formula One car built for the 1979 season by the Walter Wolf Racing team. Three examples of the car were produced. The first was WR7. A second car, WR8, was built to the same specification, while a slightly modified car, WR9, first appeared at the British Grand Prix. The cars were driven by 1976 champion James Hunt and Keke Rosberg. The engine was a Ford Cosworth DFV.

== Competition history ==
The car was designed by Harvey Postlethwaite, previously responsible for the Hesketh 308 in which James Hunt won his first race. Wolf's former driver Jody Scheckter left the team at the end of 1978, going to Ferrari, where he would win the World Championship. He was replaced by 1976 champion James Hunt. When it was found that Hunt was unable to fit into the Wolf WR5/6 chassis, a new car had to be built in a haste prior to the season opener in Argentina. The cars proved unreliable and uncompetitive, with Hunt only finishing one of his six races in WR7 and WR8. The assertion made by Motor Sport magazine ahead of the season that Hunt was a driver likely to "quickly lose interest" when not provided with a competitive machine proved right after the 1979 Monaco Grand Prix when he left the team to join BBC Sport as a commentator. Keke Rosberg took over his drive for the remainder of the season, but also only finished one race. Rosberg crashed WR9 heavily during qualifying for the Canadian Grand Prix so a hybrid car using WR8's monocoque, dubbed WR8/9 was built up for his use in the United States.

At the end of the 1979 Formula One season, Walter Wolf, owner of the team, pulled out of Formula One and sold the assets of his organisation to Wilson and Emerson Fittipaldi for the use of their Fittipaldi Automotive team. The WR7 cars were raced as Fittipaldi F7s in the early part of the 1980 Formula One season by Emerson Fittipaldi and Rosberg.

== Complete Formula One World Championship results ==
(key) (results in bold indicate pole position; results in italics indicate fastest lap)

Year	Entrants	Chassis	Engine	Tyres	Drivers	1	2	3	4	5	6	7	8	9	10	11	12	13	14	15	Points	WCC
1979	Walter Wolf Racing	Wolf WR7; Wolf WR8; Wolf WR8/9; Wolf WR9	Ford Cosworth DFV 3.0 V8	G		ARG	BRA	RSA	USW	ESP	BEL	MON	FRA	GBR	GER	AUT	NED	ITA	CAN	USA	0	NC
1979	Walter Wolf Racing	Wolf WR7; Wolf WR8; Wolf WR8/9; Wolf WR9	Ford Cosworth DFV 3.0 V8	G	James Hunt	Ret	Ret	8	Ret	Ret	Ret	Ret									0	NC
1979	Walter Wolf Racing	Wolf WR7; Wolf WR8; Wolf WR8/9; Wolf WR9	Ford Cosworth DFV 3.0 V8	G	Keke Rosberg								9	Ret	Ret	Ret	Ret	Ret	DNQ	Ret	0	NC
1980	Skol Fittipaldi Team	Fittipaldi F7	Ford Cosworth DFV 3.0 V8	G		ARG	BRA	RSA	USW	BEL	MON	FRA	GBR	GER	AUT	NED	ITA	CAN	USA		11	8th
1980	Skol Fittipaldi Team	Fittipaldi F7	Ford Cosworth DFV 3.0 V8	G	Emerson Fittipaldi	NC	15	8	3	Ret	6	Ret									11	8th
1980	Skol Fittipaldi Team	Fittipaldi F7	Ford Cosworth DFV 3.0 V8	G	Keke Rosberg	3	9	Ret	Ret	7	DNQ	Ret	DNQ								11	8th
