= Montreal Children's Theatre =

Theatre in Montreal, Quebec, Canada

The Montreal Children's Theatre (MCT) is a children's theatre company in Montreal, Quebec. Founded in 1933 by Dorothy Davis and Violet Walters, the school is still in operation as of 2026. Walters and Davis started MCT "not necessarily to create young actors and actresses, but with the premise that good speech, self-esteem and confidence were primary goals …".

MCT has presented over 700 stage productions to more than a quarter of a million children. A prominent alumnus of MCT is the actor William Shatner.

== History ==
The first class at MCT in 1933 had less than 25 students and was held in a basement. The theatre was run by Davis and Walters until 1991. It was then managed by Sheila April, a former student, until 2006. In that year, Leigh Janson Cooke and Ryan Bowels took over management. In 2019, Sandra Holder became the new president.

"Over 10,000 Montrealers have enjoyed classes at The Children's Theatre since the school was founded in 1933 by Dorothy Davis and Violet Walters. Some have gone onto professional careers in motion pictures, television and the stage. Many have obtained roles in TV and radio commercials both as children and adults."

== Timeline ==
- 1933–1991 – Founded and ran by Violet Walters and Dorothy Davis.
- 1991–2006 – Ran by Shelia April, a former student.
- 2006–2019 – Ran by Leigh Janson Cooke and Ryan Bowels.
- 2019–Present run by Sandra Holder.

== Major productions (incomplete) ==
- "96th major production": Apr 25, May 2 & May 9 1964 (31st anniversary) Snow White and the Seven Dwarfs, Victoria Hall
- "100th major production":
- "101st major production":
- "102nd major production":
- "103rd major production":
- "104th major production":
- "105th major production":
- "106th major production": May 6–20, 1967: ("34th anniversary") The Frog Prince, Victoria Hall
- "107th major production":
- "108th major production":
- "109th major production": Apr 16–18, 1968: ("35th anniversary") The Pied Piper, Victoria Hall
- "110th major production": Dec 26–28, 1968: ("36th anniversary") Snow White and the Seven Dwarfs, Victoria Hall
- "111th major production": Feb 15 – March 1, 1969: ("36th anniversary") Hansel & Gretel, Victoria Hall
- "112th major production": Apr 19 – May 3, 1969: ("36th anniversary") Jack and the Beanstalk, Victoria Hall
- "113th major production": (numbered as "114th on program) Dec 26–29, 1969: ("37th anniversary") The Magic Apple, Victoria Hall
- "114th major production": Feb 21 – March 7, 1970: ("37th anniversary") Heidi, Victoria Hall
- "115th major production": No production was given this number
- "116th major production": May 9–23, 1970: ("37th anniversary") Old King Cole, Victoria Hall
- "117th major production": Dec 28–30, 1970: ("38th anniversary") The Princess and the Swinherd, Victoria Hall
- "118th major production": Feb 13–27, 1971: ("38th anniversary") Rumpelstiltskin, Victoria Hall
- "119th major production": Apr 17 – May 1, 1971: ("38th anniversary") Red Shoes, Victoria Hall
- "120th major production": Nov 20 – December 4, 1971: ("39th anniversary") The Sleeping Beauty, Victoria Hall
- "121st major production": Apr 1–22, 1972: ("39th anniversary") Cinderella, Victoria Hall
- "122nd major production":
- "123rd major production": Nov 18 – December 2, 1972: ("40th anniversary") Aladdin and the Wonderful Lamp, Victoria Hall
- "124th major production": Apr 7–28, 1973: ("40th anniversary") Snow White and the Seven Dwarfs, Victoria Hall
- "125th major production":
- "126th major production":
- "127th major production":
- "128th major production":
- "129th major production": Apr 12 – May 3, 1976:("41st year") The Frog Prince, Victoria Hall
- "130th major production": Nov 8–29, 1976: ("42nd year") Heidi, Victoria Hall
- "131st major production": Mar 20 – Apr 10: Beauty & the Beast, Victoria Hall
- "132nd major production":
- "133rd major production": Nov 6–20, 1977: ("43rd year") The Sleeping Beauty, Victoria Hall
- "134th major production": Apr 23 – 7 May: Pinocchio, Victoria Hall
- "135th major production":
- "136th major production":
- "137th major production": Nov 11 – December 2, 1978: ("45th year") Snow-White & the Seven Dwarfs, F.C. Smith Auditorium, Concordia University, Loyola Campus
- "138th major production": Apr 7–28, 1979: Aladdin and the Wonderful Lamp, F.C. Smith Auditorium, Concordia University, Loyola Campus
- "139th major production":
- "140th major production":
- "141st major production":
- "142nd major production": Mar 21 – April 11, 1981: ("47th year") Beauty and the Beast, F.C. Smith Auditorium, Concordia University, Loyola Campus
- "143rd major production":
- "144th major production":
- "145th major production":
- "146th major production":
- "147th major production":
- "148th major production":
- "149th major production": Apr 16 – May 7, 1983: Pinocchio, F.C. Smith Auditorium, Concordia University, Loyola Campus
- "150th major production":
- "151st major production":
- "152nd major production":
- "153rd major production": Nov 17 – December 8, 1984: ("51st anniversary") The Frog Prince, F.C. Smith Auditorium, Concordia University, Loyola Campus
- "154th major production":
- "155th major production":
- "156th major production":
- "157th major production": Apr 12 – May 3, 1986: ("53rd year") Jack and the Beanstalk, F.C. Smith Auditorium, Concordia University, Loyola Campus
- "158th major production": Nov 15 – December 6, 1986: ("54th year") Beauty and the Beast, F.C. Smith Auditorium, Concordia University, Loyola Campus
- "159th major production": Apr 4 – May 2, 1987: ("54th year") Hansel & Gretel, F.C. Smith Auditorium, Concordia University, Loyola Campus
- "160th major production":
- "161st major production":
- "162nd major production":
- "163rd major production":
- "164th major production":
- "165th major production": Apr 8–29, 1989: ("56th anniversary") Snow-White & the Seven Dwarfs, F.C. Smith Auditorium, Concordia University, Loyola Campus
- 90th Anniversary Production: September 16-17, 2023: Beauty and the Beast, Maison de la culture Notre-Dame-de-Grâce – Monkland.
