= 1979 Monaco Grand Prix =

Coordinates: 43°44′4.74″N 7°25′16.8″E

- Race 7 of 15 in the 1979 Formula One season
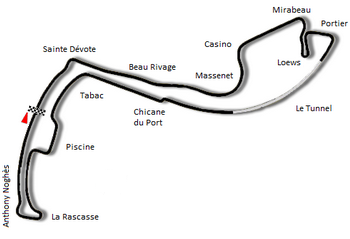

Race details
- Date: 27 May 1979
- Location: Circuit de Monaco
- Course: Street circuit
- Course length: 3.312 km (2.057 miles)
- Distance: 76 laps, 251.712 km (156.406 miles)
- Weather: Dry

Pole position
Driver	(South Africa) Jody Scheckter	Ferrari
- Time: 1:26.45

Fastest lap
Driver	(France) Patrick Depailler	Ligier-Ford
- Time: 1:28.82 on lap 69

Podium
First	(South Africa) Jody Scheckter	Ferrari
Second	(Switzerland) Clay Regazzoni	Williams-Ford
Third	(Argentina) Carlos Reutemann	Lotus-Ford

The 1979 Monaco Grand Prix was a Formula One motor race held on 27 May 1979 at Monaco. It was the 37th Monaco Grand Prix and the seventh round of the 1979 Formula One season.

The 76-lap race was won from pole position by Jody Scheckter, driving a Ferrari. Clay Regazzoni finished second in a Williams-Ford, with Carlos Reutemann third in a Lotus-Ford. Patrick Depailler set the fastest lap of the race in a Ligier-Ford.

In a race of attrition, John Watson was fourth in his McLaren-Ford, Depailler fifth despite an engine failure on the last lap, and Jochen Mass sixth in his Arrows A1. Mass had run as high as third in the race and seemed to be closing in on the leaders before brake issues dropped him down the field.

This was the final Formula One race for 1976 World Champion James Hunt. Hunt qualified tenth in his Wolf-Ford before retiring after four laps with a transmission problem.

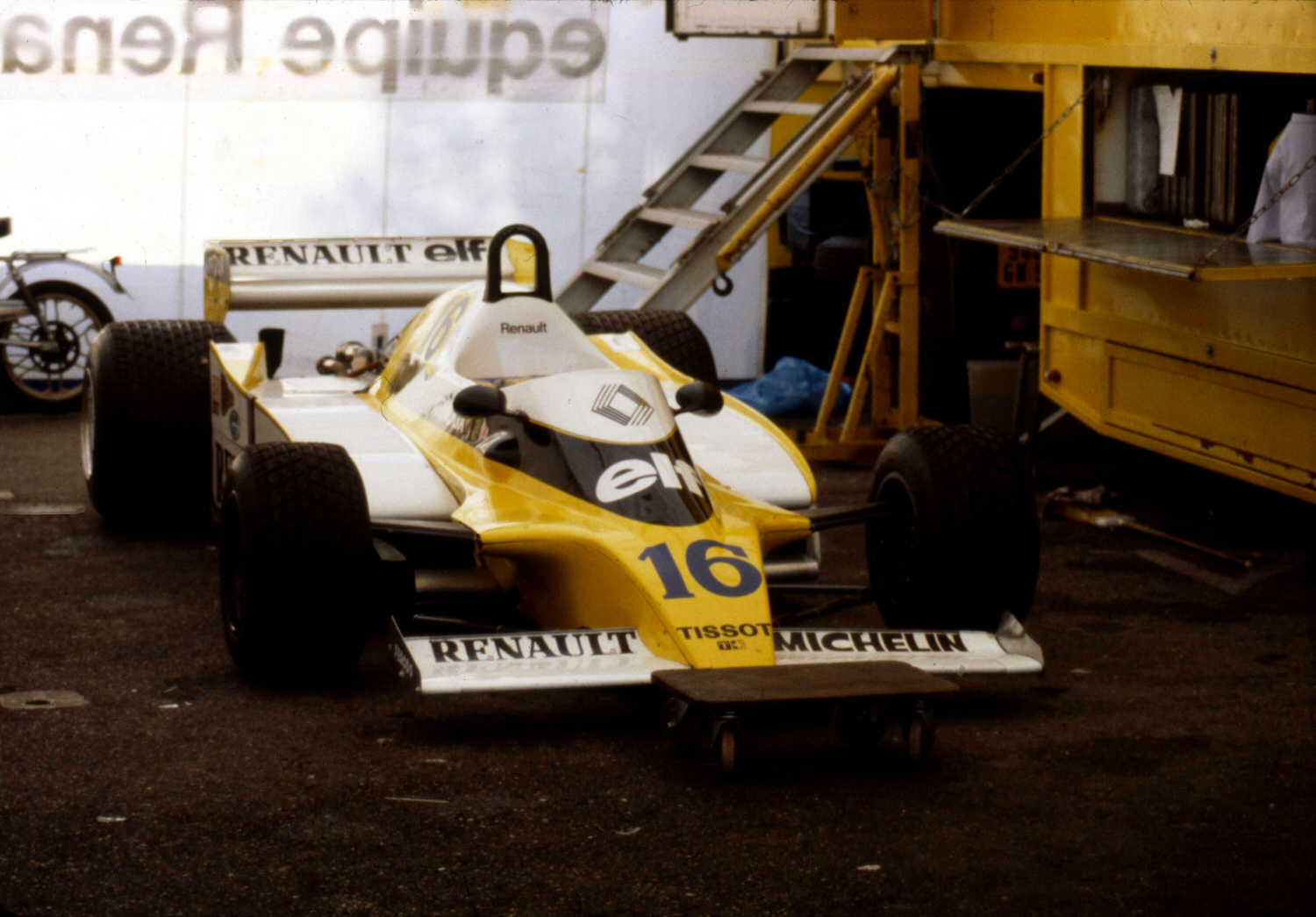
René Arnoux's Renault RS10 parked in the pits.

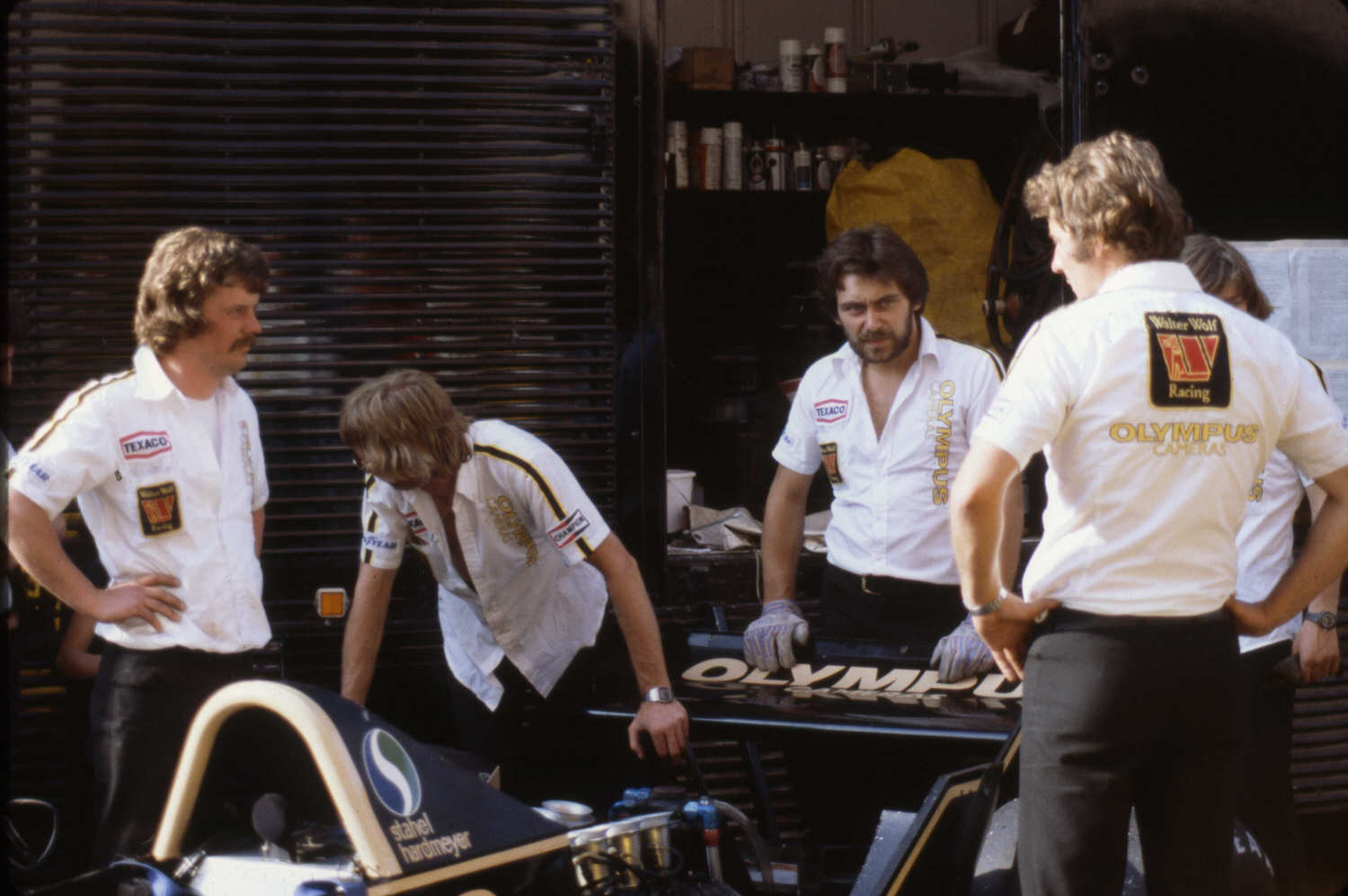
The Wolf Racing pit crew.

== Classification ==
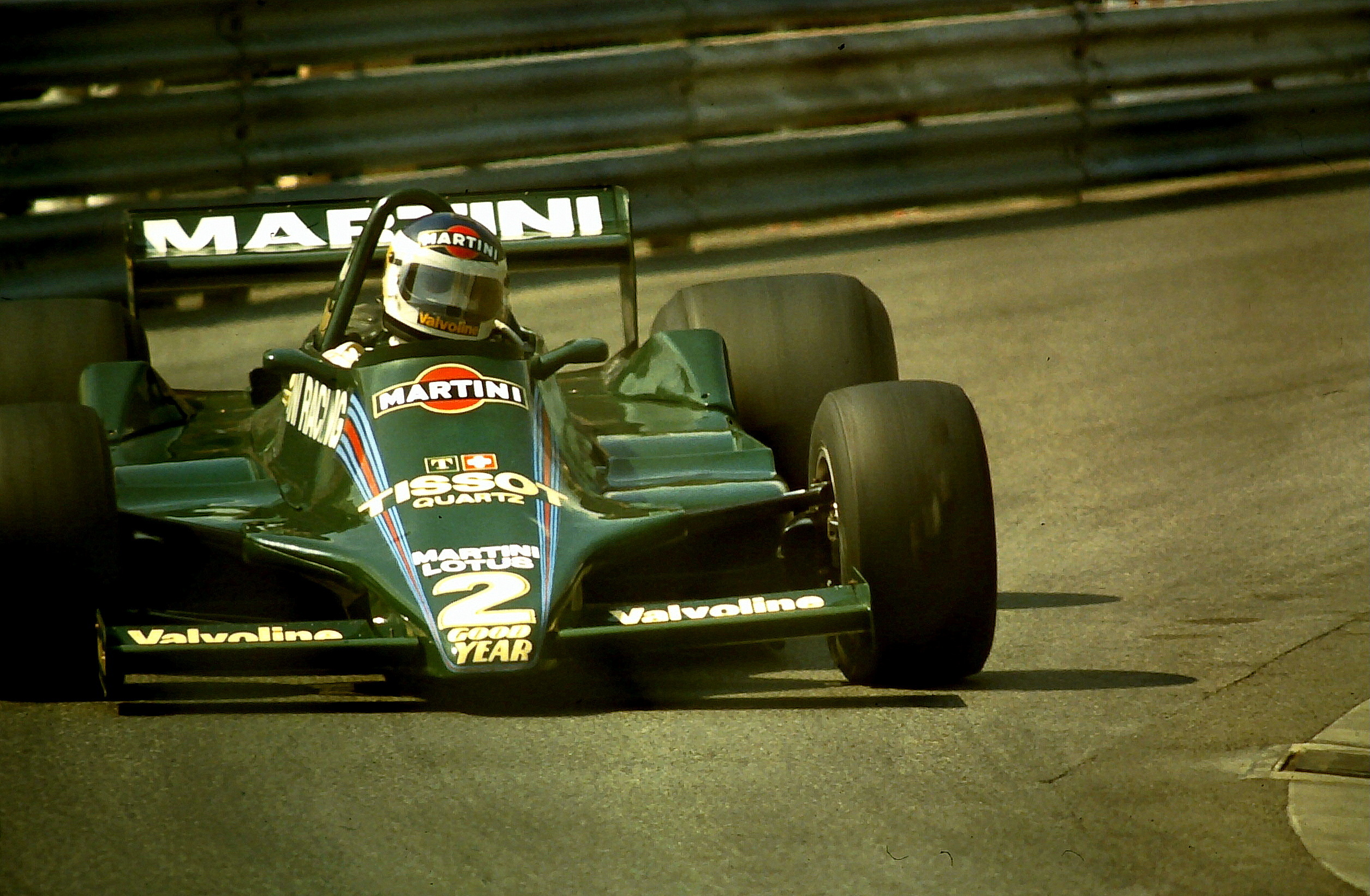
Carlos Reutemann finished third in a Lotus 79.

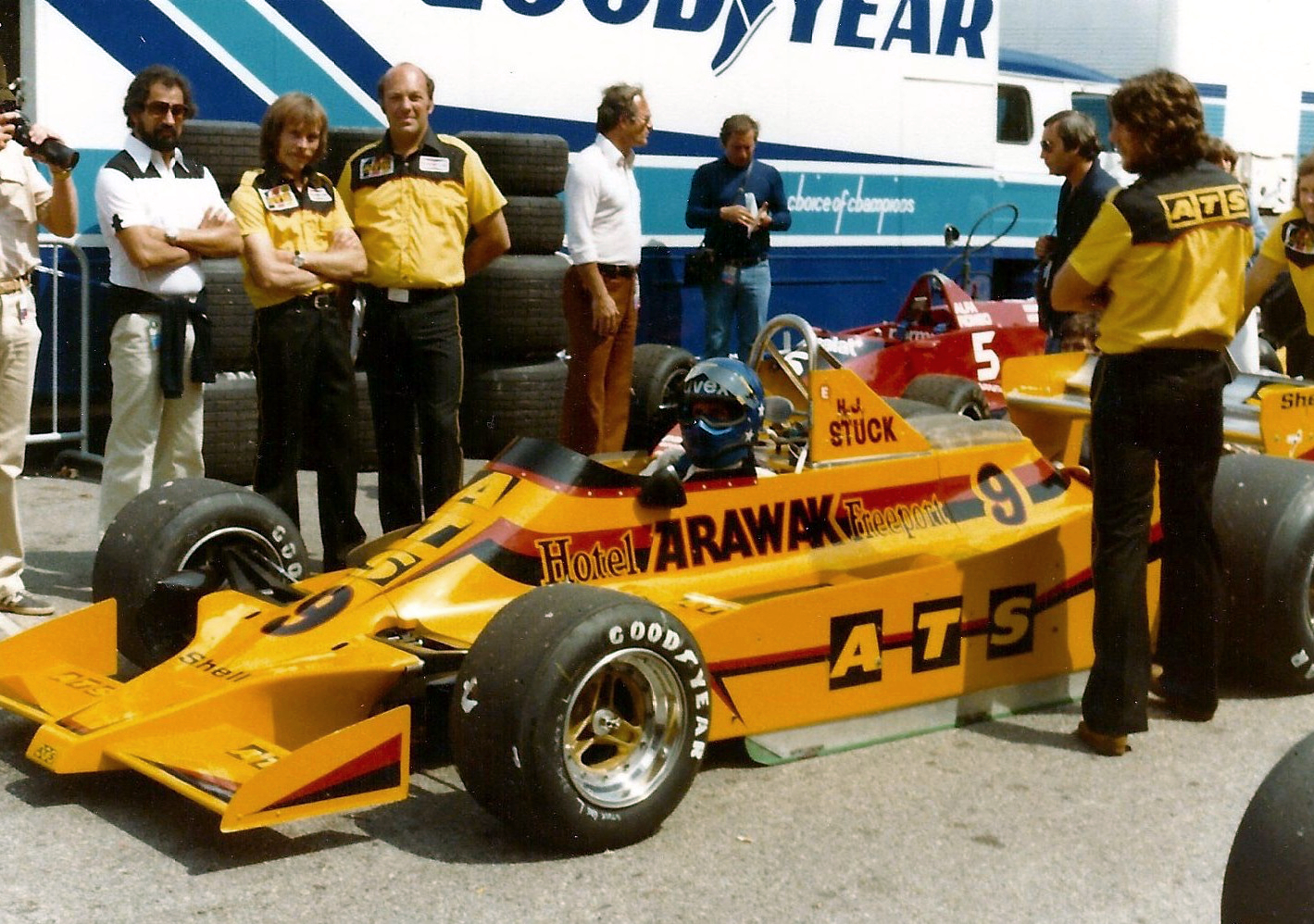
Hans-Joachim Stuck in the ATS-Ford at the 1979 Monaco Grand Prix

=== Pre-qualifying ===
Pos	No	Driver	Constructor	Time
1	9	(West Germany) Hans-Joachim Stuck	ATS-Ford	1:33.19
2	30	(West Germany) Jochen Mass	Arrows-Ford	1:34.30
DNPQ	24	(Italy) Gianfranco Brancatelli	Merzario-Ford	1:38.15

=== Qualifying ===
Pos	No	Driver	Constructor	Time
1	11	(South Africa) Jody Scheckter	Ferrari	1:26.45
2	12	(Canada) Gilles Villeneuve	Ferrari	1:26.52
3	25	(France) Patrick Depailler	Ligier-Ford	1:27.11
4	5	(Austria) Niki Lauda	Brabham-Alfa Romeo	1:27.21
5	26	(France) Jacques Laffite	Ligier-Ford	1:27.26
6	4	(France) Jean-Pierre Jarier	Tyrrell-Ford	1:27.42
7	3	(France) Didier Pironi	Tyrrell-Ford	1:27.42
8	30	(West Germany) Jochen Mass	Arrows-Ford	1:27.47
9	27	(Australia) Alan Jones	Williams-Ford	1:27.67
10	20	(United Kingdom) James Hunt	Wolf-Ford	1:27.96
11	2	(Argentina) Carlos Reutemann	Lotus-Ford	1:27.99
12	9	(West Germany) Hans-Joachim Stuck	ATS-Ford	1:28.22
13	1	(United States) Mario Andretti	Lotus-Ford	1:28.23
14	7	(United Kingdom) John Watson	McLaren-Ford	1:28.23
15	29	(Italy) Riccardo Patrese	Arrows-Ford	1:28.30
16	28	(Switzerland) Clay Regazzoni	Williams-Ford	1:28.48
17	14	(Brazil) Emerson Fittipaldi	Fittipaldi-Ford	1:28.49
18	6	(Brazil) Nelson Piquet	Brabham-Alfa Romeo	1:28.52
19	16	(France) René Arnoux	Renault	1:28.57
20	15	(France) Jean-Pierre Jabouille	Renault	1:28.68
DNQ	18	(Italy) Elio de Angelis	Shadow-Ford	1:28.70
DNQ	8	(France) Patrick Tambay	McLaren-Ford	1:29.53
DNQ	17	(Netherlands) Jan Lammers	Shadow-Ford	1:29.99
DNQ	22	(Republic of Ireland) Derek Daly	Ensign-Ford	1:30.18

=== Race ===
Pos	No	Driver	Constructor	Tyre	Laps	Time/Retired	Grid	Points
1	11	(South Africa) Jody Scheckter	Ferrari	M	76	1:55:22.48	1	9
2	28	(Switzerland) Clay Regazzoni	Williams-Ford	G	76	+ 0.44	16	6
3	2	(Argentina) Carlos Reutemann	Lotus-Ford	G	76	+ 8.57	11	4
4	7	(United Kingdom) John Watson	McLaren-Ford	G	76	+ 41.31	14	3
5	25	(France) Patrick Depailler	Ligier-Ford	G	75	Engine	3	2
6	30	(West Germany) Jochen Mass	Arrows-Ford	G	69	+ 7 Laps	8	1
Ret	6	(Brazil) Nelson Piquet	Brabham-Alfa Romeo	G	68	Transmission	18	
NC	15	(France) Jean-Pierre Jabouille	Renault	M	68	+ 8 Laps	20	
Ret	26	(France) Jacques Laffite	Ligier-Ford	G	55	Gearbox	5	
Ret	12	(Canada) Gilles Villeneuve	Ferrari	M	54	Transmission	2	
Ret	27	(Australia) Alan Jones	Williams-Ford	G	43	Steering	9	
Ret	4	(France) Jean-Pierre Jarier	Tyrrell-Ford	G	34	Suspension	6	
Ret	9	(West Germany) Hans-Joachim Stuck	ATS-Ford	G	30	Wheel	12	
Ret	5	(Austria) Niki Lauda	Brabham-Alfa Romeo	G	21	Collision	4	
Ret	3	(France) Didier Pironi	Tyrrell-Ford	G	21	Collision	7	
Ret	1	(United States) Mario Andretti	Lotus-Ford	G	21	Suspension	13	
Ret	14	(Brazil) Emerson Fittipaldi	Fittipaldi-Ford	G	17	Engine	17	
Ret	16	(France) René Arnoux	Renault	M	8	Accident	19	
Ret	20	(United Kingdom) James Hunt	Wolf-Ford	G	4	Transmission	10	
Ret	29	(Italy) Riccardo Patrese	Arrows-Ford	G	4	Suspension	15	
DNQ	18	(Italy) Elio de Angelis	Shadow-Ford	G				
DNQ	8	(France) Patrick Tambay	McLaren-Ford	G				
DNQ	17	(Netherlands) Jan Lammers	Shadow-Ford	G				
DNQ	22	(Republic of Ireland) Derek Daly	Ensign-Ford	G				
DNPQ	24	(Italy) Gianfranco Brancatelli	Merzario-Ford	G				

== Notes ==
- This was the 5th fastest lap set by a Ligier.
- This race marked the 250th podium finish for Ferrari and a Ferrari-powered car.

== Championship standings after the race ==
Drivers' Championship standings

	Pos	Driver	Points
1	1	(South Africa) Jody Scheckter	30 (34)
1	2	(France) Jacques Laffite	24
	3	(Canada) Gilles Villeneuve	20
	4	(France) Patrick Depailler	20 (22)
	5	(Argentina) Carlos Reutemann	20 (25)

Constructors' Championship standings

	Pos	Constructor	Points
	1	(Italy) Ferrari	54
	2	(France) Ligier-Ford	46
	3	(United Kingdom) Lotus-Ford	37
	4	(United Kingdom) Tyrrell-Ford	15
1	5	(United Kingdom) Williams-Ford	10

- Note: Only the top five positions are included for both sets of standings. Only the best 4 results from the first 7 races and the best 4 results from the last 8 races counted towards the Drivers' Championship. Numbers without parentheses are Championship points; numbers in parentheses are total points scored.

Previous race: 1979 Belgian Grand Prix	FIA Formula One World Championship; 1979 season	Next race: 1979 French Grand Prix
Previous race: 1978 Monaco Grand Prix	Monaco Grand Prix	Next race: 1980 Monaco Grand Prix
