= Twenty-Nine =

1969 British film by Brian Cummins

- Directed by: Brian Cummins
- Screenplay by: Brian Cummins
- Produced by: Peter Shillingford
- Starring: Alexis Kanner; Susan Hunt; Robert Lang
- Cinematography: Tony Richmond
- Edited by: Peter Moseley
- Music by: Tuesday's Children
- Production company: Shillingford-Lambe Associates
- Release date: 1969
- Running time: 26 minutes
- Country: United Kingdom
- Language: English

Twenty-Nine (also known as 29) is a 1969 British short drama film directed and written by Brian Cummins and starring Alexis Kanner, Susan Hunt and Robert Lang.

A man wakes up in a strange apartment and tries to piece together the events of the night before.

== Plot ==
Twenty-nine year old heavy-drinker Graham Baird, a married but promiscuous man, wakes up late with a hangover finding himself in an unfamiliar Chelsea apartment, wearing someone else's clothes. He remembers the previous evening's events: a visit to a strip-club and a prostitute, dinner date with a girl called Priscilla followed by a club and a drugs party. In the evening paper he sees the headline "London Girl Murdered" and suspects he is responsible for Priscilla's death. Panicking, he flees the apartment. Later, Priscilla and her boyfriend Butler enter the flat, and phone Baird's wife to tell her that he will soon be home.

== Cast ==
- Alexis Kanner as Graham Baird
- Susan Hunt as Priscilla Hemmings
- Robert Lang as Peter
- Justine Lord as Dee Baird
- Peter Sanders as Butler
- Yootha Joyce as prostitute
- Tuesday's Children as themselves

== Music ==
In the nightclub scene, the band Tuesday's Children play their song "She", later released as a single.

== Reception ==
Kine Weekly wrote: "Interesting, well-made little film that will do well in support of a fashionably longer feature. ... It is a very neat, absorbing little drama and extremely well acted by that former Softly, Softly heart-throb Alexis Kanner, whose slightly cocky manner is so appealing to a large number of young women. And young Susan Hunt, who plays the girl who has the laugh on him, shows promise."

The Monthly Film Bulletin wrote: "It's hard to tell whether this tawdry little drama with its wooden acting and clumsy photography is supposed to be an uncritical reflection of life in Swinging London or a cautionary parable about the pitfalls of Sordid Soho. It's harder still to care."

In Starburst magazine Martin Unsworth wrote: "Like an episode of Tales of the Unexpected, this has a lovely little twist, and a surprising appearance from George and Mildred’s Yootha Joyce, as well as giving us a small glimpse of Soho in the sixties".

== Home media ==
The film is included on the British Film Institute's Short Sharp Shocks 2-disc Blu-ray set (BFI Flipside 41, 2020).
