= Rosso Corporation =

Japanese model car manufacturer

Rosso Corporation (株式会社 ロッソ, Kabushiki-gaisha Rosso) was a Japanese scale model manufacturer specializing in plastic scale kits and pre-assembled model cars. Rosso only made models in 1992 - for approximately one year.

== History ==
The Rosso Corporation was reportedly founded by the son-in-law of the owner of Fujimi Mokei in 1992. The company produced scale models for a short period until a fire broke out in the company factory, destroying all dies, tooling, and molding machines. As a result, the company never recovered, ceased the production, and soon fell into bankruptcy. Prior to the fire, the last model to be released by the company was the 1:8 scale rendition of the Ferrari 643 Formula 1 race car. Much of the stock for this model was destroyed by the fire, thus few reached retailers. Being the company's rarest model, it often sells for about $700 US dollars or more on Internet auction sites such as eBay.

== Product lines ==
Even though the company had a short production period, Rosso models are respected for their engineering and detail. Build quality is regarded as superior to that of rivals. Models were typically made of Acrylonitrile butadiene styrene (ABS) plastic and notably consist of white metal parts in the chassis and suspension. Opening doors and bonnet and moving windscreen wipers were also often featured. Some car bodies, especially those in 1:24 and 1:43 scale, came prepainted.

Throughout the short production period, the Rosso model range consisted of Nissan Skyline GT-R (R32), Ferrari F40, Honda NSX, Ferrari 512TR, Mazda RX-7 (FD3S) and the Ferrari 642 & 643 F1 cars. These were produced in varying scales of 1:43, 1:24, 1:12 and even 1:8. Most models were produced in kit form, but some, particularly the 1:43 scale cars, were also available pre-assembled.
