= Ferrari 641 =

1990 Formula One racing car by Ferrari

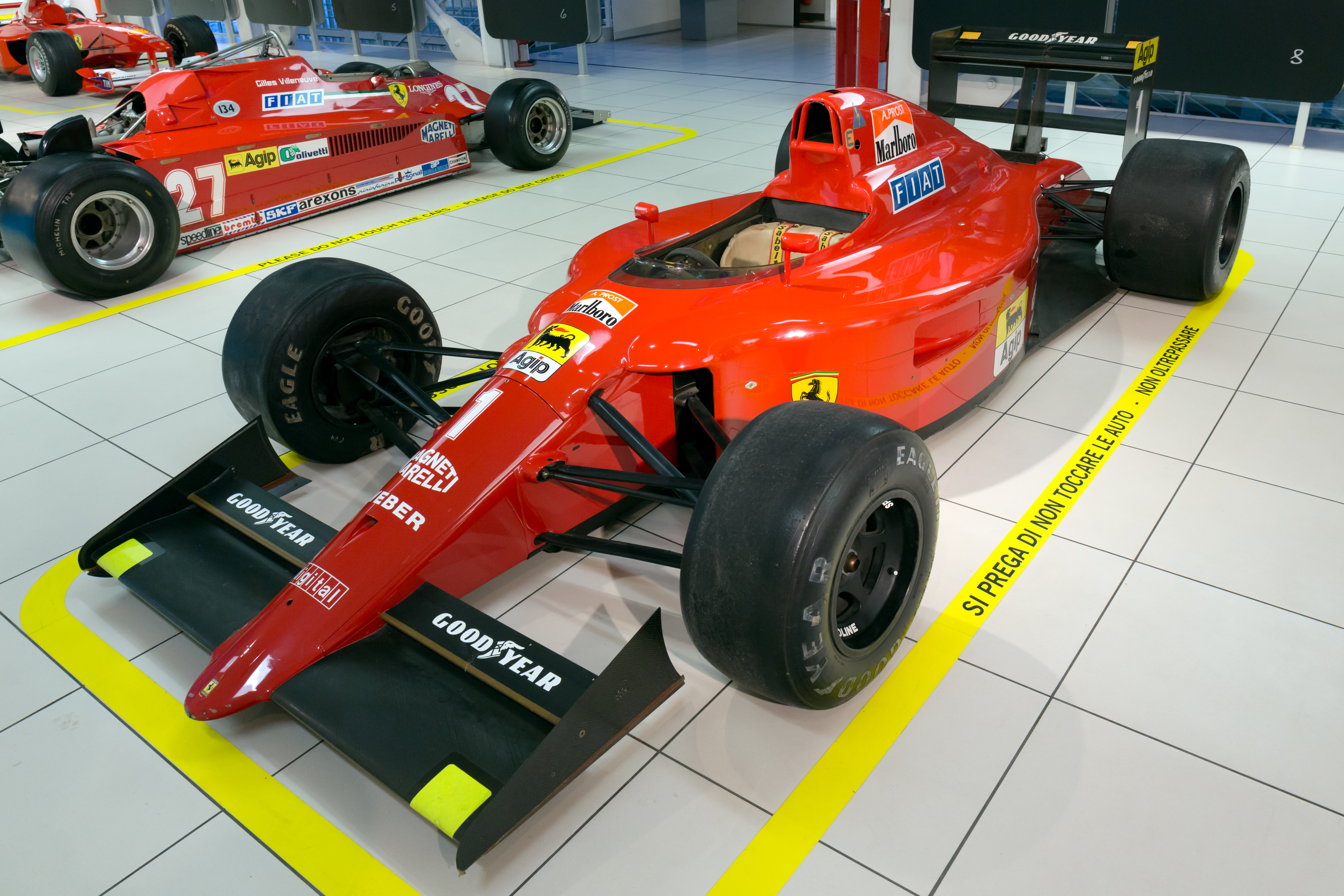
- Ferrari 641/2 (chassis 117)
- Category: Formula One
- Constructor: Ferrari
- Designers: John Barnard (Technical Director) (initial design); Steve Nichols (Technical Director); Pierguido Castelli (Technical Coordination Director); Enrique Scalabroni (Chief Designer); Henri Durand (Head of Aerodynamics); Paolo Massai (Engine Department Director)
- Predecessor: 640
- Successor: 642

Technical specifications
- Chassis: Kevlar and Carbon fibre composite monocoque
- Suspension (front): Double wishbones, push-rod actuated torsion bar springs, and telescopic shock absorbers, anti-roll bar
- Suspension (rear): Double wishbones, pushrod actuated coil springs over telescopic shock absorbers, anti-roll bar
- Engine: Ferrari Tipo 036 3.5 L (213.6 cu in), 65° V12, NA, mid-engine, longitudinally mounted
- Transmission: Ferrari 7-speed semi-automatic
- Power: 680 bhp (507 kW; 689 PS) @ 12,750 rpm
- Fuel: Agip
- Tyres: Goodyear

Competition history
- Notable entrants: Scuderia Ferrari SpA
- Notable drivers: 1. (France) Alain Prost; 2. (United Kingdom) Nigel Mansell
- Debut: 1990 United States Grand Prix
- First win: 1990 Brazilian Grand Prix
- Last win: 1990 Spanish Grand Prix
- Last event: 1990 Australian Grand Prix
Races	Wins	Podiums	Poles	F/Laps
16	6	14	3	5

The Ferrari 641 (also known as the Ferrari F1-90) was the Formula One racing car with which the Ferrari team competed in the 1990 Formula One World Championship.

== Development ==
The 641 was a developed version of its predecessor, the 1989 Ferrari 640, designed by John Barnard. The updated 641 design was overseen by former McLaren designer Steve Nichols after Barnard left Ferrari to join the Benetton team, once the car's development was complete. The car was powered by a 3.5-litre V12 engine, first with the type 036, and later in San Marino with the updated 037. The V12 was rated at 680 bhp (507 kW; 689 PS), only slightly down on the 690 bhp (515 kW; 700 PS) Honda V10 engines used by McLaren, but not as flexible or as good at delivering power out of slow corners as the Honda, the Renault V10 engine used by Williams or the Ford-Cosworth HB V8 used by Benetton. Despite its heavier engine, the 641 was among the best handling cars on the grid. Prost declared it the best car of the year.

The Ferrari 641 was also the first Formula One car to use an effective traction control system, which debuted at the 1990 Portuguese Grand Prix in Estoril; less than two years before a traction control system debuted on the eventually highly successful Williams FW14B. Ferrari technicians sat down on the Tuesday after the Italian GP on September 11, and developed a rudimentary traction control system, which debuted in Portugal less than two weeks later. The system was relatively simple and straightforward; using just some software and a wheel speed sensor.

Incorporating the semi-automatic gearbox developed during the previous season, the car was seen to be technically advanced. The aerodynamics were reworked and the chassis gave a slightly longer wheelbase than its predecessor. Nichols designed the car with Alain Prost’s smooth driving style in mind. Prost worked hard on improving the reliability of the gearbox and also worked behind the scenes to bring the whole Ferrari team closer together. A variable inlet trumpet system on the engine was tested throughout the season but did not become standard equipment.

== Racing history ==
Ferrari's major coup was signing reigning World Champion Prost from McLaren to partner Nigel Mansell. The car scored six wins in the 1990 season (Prost five, Mansell one).

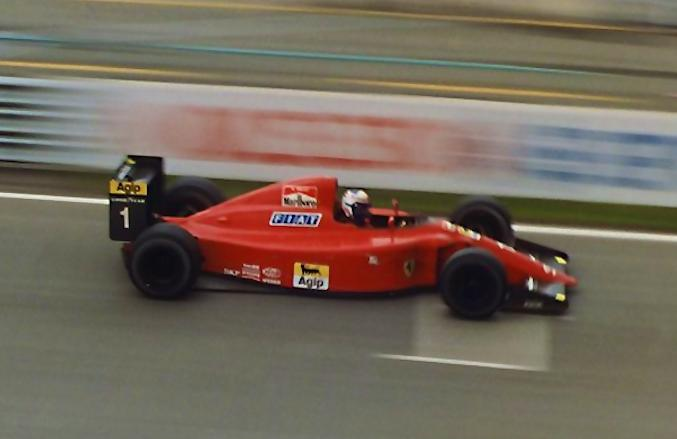
Alain Prost driving the 641 at the 1990 Canadian Grand Prix.

Prost's development work helped the 641 chassis to be extremely fast and competitive, and he scored five wins, including a remarkable victory from 13th place on the grid in Mexico, and challenged his nemesis Ayrton Senna for the championship. In the same race, Mansell outfoxed Gerhard Berger with a daring passing move at the fearsome Peraltada corner. Although the car occasionally struggled in qualifying, it appeared to have the edge on the McLarens in race trim, particularly at high-speed circuits. At the British Grand Prix, Mansell dominated qualifying while Prost struggled. Feeling that Mansell's car was superior to his own, he convinced the team to switch the chassis before the race, which he won while Mansell retired with gearbox failure while leading and setting fastest lap of the race promptly announced his quitting the sport. However, the famous collision between Prost and Senna at the Japanese Grand Prix sealed the Drivers' Championship for Senna and the Constructors' Championship for McLaren. Prost finished runner-up in the championship and Mansell finished 5th and scored 1 win, including excellent performance in his last race for Ferrari at Adelaide, where he finished 2nd and almost won that race from Nelson Piquet and his Benetton-Ford. It would be another seven years before Ferrari would challenge for either championship again.

== Aftermath ==
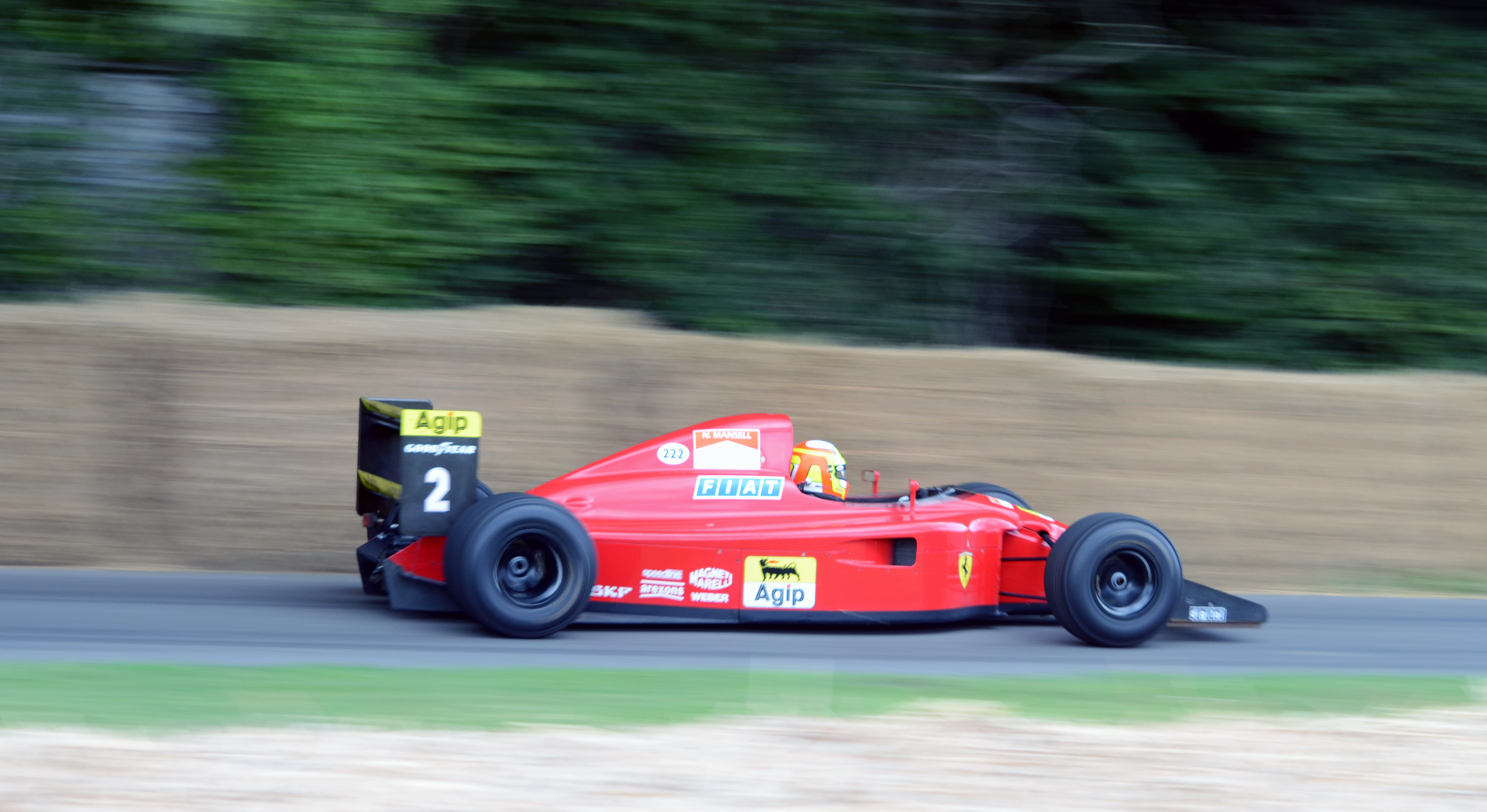
Ferrari 641 at the 2017 Goodwood Festival of Speed

Tiff Needell drove the 641 on Top Gear in 1995 in a segment where his co-host Jeremy Clarkson tested a Ferrari F50 and did a drag race against Needell in the 641 and some comparisons as well because the F50 road car is based on the 641.

The 641 was featured in F1 2019 as a DLC for the "Legends Edition" and for free in F1 2020, Test Drive: Ferrari Racing Legends, Forza Motorsport 6, Forza Motorsport 7, and Forza Motorsport.

== Complete Formula One results ==
(key) (results in bold indicate pole position; results in italics indicate fastest lap)

Year	Team	Engine	Tyres	Drivers	1	2	3	4	5	6	7	8	9	10	11	12	13	14	15	16	Pts.	WCC
1990	Scuderia Ferrari	Ferrari Tipo 036; Ferrari Tipo 037; V12	**G**		USA	BRA	SMR	MON	CAN	MEX	FRA	GBR	GER	HUN	BEL	ITA	POR	ESP	JPN	AUS	**110**	**2nd**
1990	Scuderia Ferrari	Ferrari Tipo 036; Ferrari Tipo 037; V12	**G**	(France) Alain Prost	Ret	1	4	Ret	5	1	1	1	4	Ret	2	2	3	1	Ret	3	**110**	**2nd**
1990	Scuderia Ferrari	Ferrari Tipo 036; Ferrari Tipo 037; V12	**G**	(United Kingdom) Nigel Mansell	Ret	4	Ret	Ret	3	2	**18†**	**Ret**	Ret	17†	Ret	4	**1**	2	Ret	2	**110**	**2nd**

† Driver did not finish the race, but was still classified as they completed at least 90% of the race distance.

== Chassis log ==
The current locations of the 641 chassis are:

- 115 - Museum of Modern Art (USA)
- 116 - destroyed in testing
- 117 - Museo Ferrari (Italy)
- 118 - Private collection (Germany)
- 119 - Private collection (Switzerland)
- 120 - Private collection (Germany)
- 121 - Private collection (UK)

== Other sources ==
- AUTOCOURSE 1990-91 by Alan Henry
- AUTOCOURSE 1991-92 by Alan Henry
