= Alain Prost =

French racing driver (born 1955)

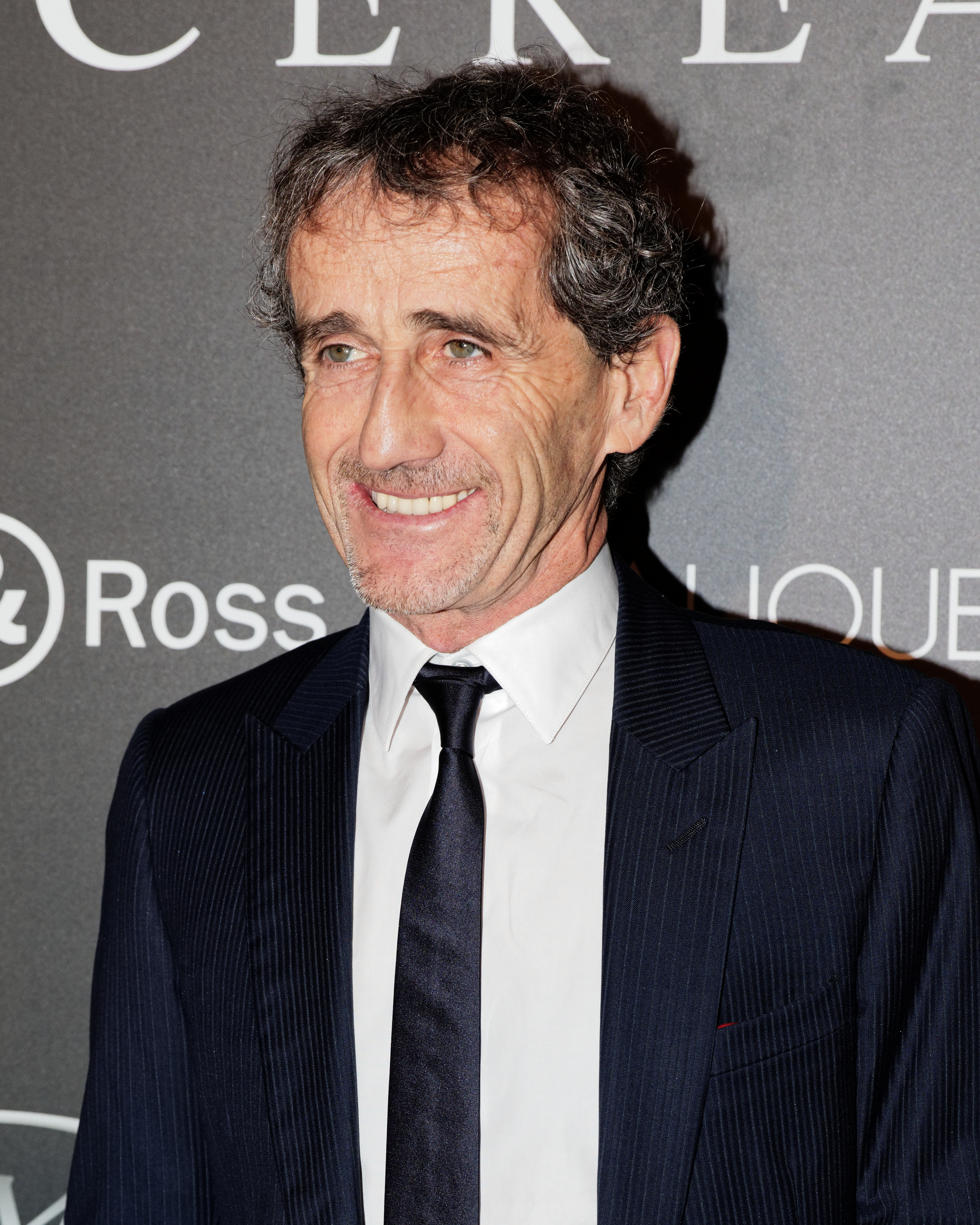
- Prost in 2015
- Born: Alain Marie Pascal Prost; 24 February 1955 (age 71); Lorette, France
- Spouse: Anne-Marie Barges (m. 1980; div. 2017)
- Children: 3, including Nico

Formula One World Championship career
- Nationality: (France) French
- Active years: 1980–1991, 1993
- Team(s): McLaren, Renault, Ferrari, Williams
- Entries: 202 (199 starts)
- Championships: 4 (1985, 1986, 1989, 1993)
- Wins: 51
- Podiums: 106
- Career points: 768.5 (798.5) (Note: Up until 1990, not all points scored by a driver contributed to their final World Championship tally (see list of points scoring systems for more information). Numbers without parentheses are Championship points; numbers in parentheses are total points scored.)
- Pole positions: 33
- Fastest laps: 41
- First entry: 1980 Argentine Grand Prix
- First win: 1981 French Grand Prix
- Last win: 1993 German Grand Prix
- Last entry: 1993 Australian Grand Prix

Alain Marie Pascal Prost (French pronunciation: [alɛ̃ pʁɔst]; born 24 February 1955) is a French former racing driver and motorsport executive, who competed in Formula One from 1980 to 1993. Nicknamed "the Professor", (Note: French: Le Professeur Prost was widely known as the Professor for his methodical and analytical approach to racing.) Prost won four Formula One World Drivers' Championship titles and—at the time of his retirement—held the records for most wins (51), fastest laps (41), and podium finishes (106).

Born in Lorette, Loire, Prost began karting aged 14, winning the junior World Cup four years later, and progressing to junior formulae in 1976. Prost won his first title at the Formula Renault National Championship that year, prior to winning the Challenge de Formule Renault Europe in 1977. Replaced by the French Formula Three Championship the following season, he successfully defended his titles in 1978 and 1979. His junior career culminated in his victory at the 1979 FIA European Formula 3 Championship with Oreca. Prost signed for McLaren in 1980, making his Formula One debut at the Argentine Grand Prix, where he finished sixth. He moved to Renault in 1981, taking his maiden victory at his home Grand Prix in France, with further wins in the Netherlands and Italy. Following multiple race wins in his 1982 campaign with Renault, Prost finished runner-up to Nelson Piquet in the 1983 World Drivers' Championship after retiring with a turbo failure in the title-decider. Prost was sacked by Renault two days later for his post-season comments and moved back to McLaren for 1984, where he finished runner-up to teammate Niki Lauda by a record half-point. (Note: From 1980 until 2022, half-points were awarded in Formula One for incomplete races that had run between two laps and 75% of the scheduled race distance.)

In 1985, Prost won his maiden title with McLaren, becoming the first World Drivers' Champion from France. He successfully defended his title the following season, amidst a close title battle with Piquet and Nigel Mansell. After winning several races in his 1987 campaign, Prost was partnered by Ayrton Senna. Together, they won all Grands Prix bar one in 1988—driving the Honda-powered MP4/4—with Senna taking the title by three points. (Note: In the 1981 to 1990 points system, each driver's best 11 results counted towards the Drivers' Championship. With all results counted, Prost scored 105 points to Senna's 94.) Their fierce rivalry culminated in title-deciding collisions at Suzuka in 1989 and 1990, despite Prost's move to Ferrari in the latter, with Prost winning the former championship and Senna taking the following. Amidst a winless 1991 campaign, he was sacked by Ferrari over comments made about the 643. After a year hiatus, Prost returned with Williams in 1993, breaking several records on the way to his fourth championship and retiring at the end of the season. He returned to Formula One as the owner of Prost Grand Prix from 1997 to 2001, having purchased Ligier. Prost held an advisory role at Renault—later re-branded as Alpine—from 2017 to 2021.

After retiring from Formula One, Prost was a race-winner in the 2005 FFSA GT Championship, and entered the Race of Champions in 2010, representing France alongside Sébastien Loeb. In ice racing, Prost is a three-time champion of the Andros Trophy, competing from 2003 to 2012. He was the co-owner of Renault e.dams in Formula E until 2018, winning three consecutive Teams' Championships from 2014–15 to 2016–17. Prost was inducted into the International Motorsports Hall of Fame in 1999.

== Early life ==
Alain Prost was born in the commune of Lorette near the town of Saint-Chamond, in the département of Loire close to Saint-Étienne, France to André Prost and Marie-Rose Karatchian, born in France of Armenian descent. His father ran a furniture store. Prost had one older brother called Daniel, who died of cancer in September 1986. Prost was an active and athletic child, who enthusiastically took part in diverse sports, including wrestling, roller skating and football. In doing so he broke his nose several times. He considered careers as a gym instructor or a professional footballer before he discovered kart racing at the age of 14 while on a family holiday. This new sport quickly became his career of choice. At age 16, he bought his first kart with money he saved working for his father's shop.

Prost won several karting championships in his teens. In 1974, he became a full-time racer. He won the French senior karting championship in 1975.

Prost made the transition to open-wheel racing in 1976 and rapidly progressed through the junior categories. That year, he dominated French (Note: There were several national Formula Renault championships in Europe.) Formula Renault, winning the title and all but one race. In 1977, he won the Formula Renault European championship. In 1978, he won the French Formula Three championship while simultaneously competing in the European Formula Three category. Finally, in 1979, he won both the European and French Formula Three titles. He also made three guest appearances in European Formula Two in 1977 and 1978.

Prost's Formula Three wins drew interest from Formula One teams and sponsors. Before the final race of the 1979 season, Paddy McNally and John Hogan of Marlboro (McLaren's lead sponsor) offered to cover the costs of a third McLaren car so that Prost could make an early Formula One debut, but Prost declined the cameo appearance, reasoning that it would be a mistake to debut in Formula One without being fully prepared: "I didn't know Watkins Glen and I didn't know the car. I said I thought it would be a better idea to organise a test."

== Formula One ==
=== McLaren (1980) ===
After winning the European Formula Three title, Prost was courted by Formula One teams McLaren, Brabham, and Ligier. After impressing McLaren team boss Teddy Mayer at a test drive, McLaren signed him for the 1980 season. He was paired with Ulsterman John Watson.

Prost's career started promisingly. On his debut in Buenos Aires, he accomplished the rare achievement of scoring in his first race, earning one point for finishing sixth. From 1973 to 1993, only two other drivers earned points in their maiden race (Johnny Herbert and Jean Alesi). However, Prost finished 15th in the Drivers' Championship with five points (one point behind the veteran Watson), scoring at Buenos Aires, Interlagos, Brands Hatch and Zandvoort. He had several accidents, breaking his wrist during practice at Kyalami and suffering a concussion during practice at Watkins Glen. He also retired from the previous round in Montreal a week earlier because of rear suspension failure.

At the end of the season, despite having two years remaining on his contract, Prost left McLaren and signed with Renault. Prost later explained that he left because the car frequently broke down and because he felt the team blamed him for several accidents. According to Watson, Mayer had initially wanted to sign Kevin Cogan but Marlboro insisted on Prost. Prost would not return to McLaren until 1984, after Ron Dennis assumed full control of the team.

=== Renault (1981–1983) ===
Prost was partnered with fellow Frenchman René Arnoux for 1981. Motor sports author Nigel Roebuck reports that there were problems between Prost and Arnoux from the start of the season, Prost being immediately quicker than his more experienced teammate He did not finish the first two Grands Prix, due to collisions with Andrea de Cesaris in Long Beach and Didier Pironi at Jacarepaguá, but scored his first podium finish at Buenos Aires. He also did not finish in the next four races, and then won his first Formula One race at his home Grand Prix in France at the fast Dijon circuit, finishing two seconds ahead of his old teammate John Watson.

For Prost, his debut victory was memorable mostly for the change it made in his mindset. "Before, you thought you could do it," he said. "Now you know you can." Prost led from the start the next five races, and won two more races during the season, took his first pole position in Germany and finished on the podium every time he completed a race distance. He won again in Holland and Italy, and finished fifth in the Drivers' Championship, seven points behind champion Nelson Piquet.

Prost won the first two Grands Prix of the 1982 season in South Africa, where Prost recovered from losing a wheel, and Brazil, where he finished third but was awarded the win after Piquet (first) and Keke Rosberg (second) were disqualified. He finished in the points on four other occasions, but did not win again. Despite retiring from seven races, Prost improved on his Drivers' Championship position, finishing in fourth, but with nine fewer points than the previous year. His relationship with Arnoux deteriorated further after the French Grand Prix. Prost believes that Arnoux, who won the race, went back on a pre-race agreement to support Prost during the race. His relationship with the French media was also poor. He has since commented that "When I went to Renault the journalists wrote good things about me, but by 1982 I had become the bad guy. I think, to be honest, I had made the mistake of winning! The French don't really like winners." He added that "It's hard to explain, but the French prefer martyrs who lose gloriously."

In November 1982, three years before it became a round of the F1 World Championship, Prost, along with fellow F1 drivers Jacques Laffite and Nelson Piquet, made the trip to Melbourne, Australia to drive in the non-championship 1982 Australian Grand Prix at the short (1.609 km (1.000 mi)) Calder Park Raceway. Driving a Formula Pacific spec Ralt RT4 powered by a 1.6 litre Ford engine, Prost sat on pole for the race with a time of 39.18. He then led every lap to win what would be the first of 3 Australian Grand Prix wins. He finished 15.32 seconds clear of Laffite, with 1981 Australian Grand Prix winner, young Brazilian driver Roberto Moreno finishing third.

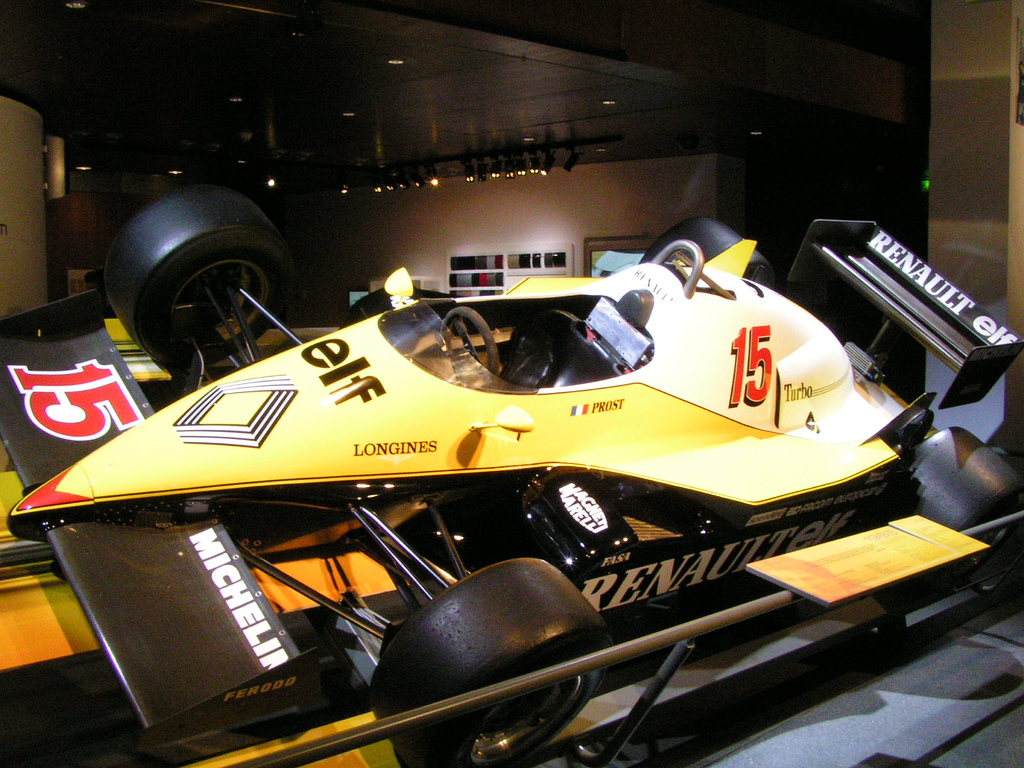
Prost's 1983 Renault RE40, in which he came close to winning his first championship

Arnoux left Renault in 1983 and American Eddie Cheever replaced him as Prost's partner, allegedly because of Renault's desire to sell more road cars in North America (three of the season's 15 races were on the North American continent). Prost earned a further four victories for Renault during the season and finished second in the Drivers' Championship, two points behind Nelson Piquet. Piquet and the Brabham team overhauled Prost and Renault in the last few races of the season. Prost, who felt the team had been too conservative in developing the car, found himself increasingly at odds with Renault's management, who made him the scapegoat for failing to win a championship. In addition to that, the French fans recalled the bitter fight that had caused their favourite, Arnoux, to leave the team. Prost said in an interview with ESPN during the final race that his car was "not competitive" and that he "didn't lose by my own fault" Renault fired Prost only two days after the South African race. He re-signed for McLaren for the 1984 season within days and moved his family home to Switzerland after Renault factory workers burned the second of 2 of Prost's cars, one of them being a Mercedes-Benz.

=== Return to McLaren (1984–1989) ===
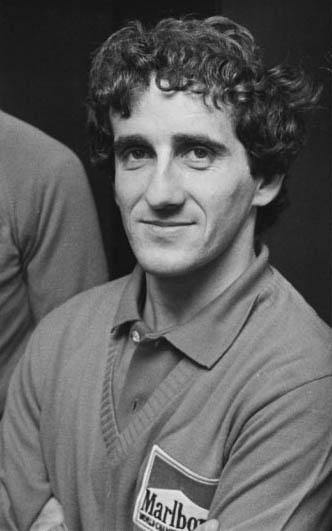
Prost in 1984

==== 1984–1986 ====
Prost joined double world champion Niki Lauda at McLaren in 1984, driving the John Barnard designed McLaren MP4/2 which used a 1.5 litre TAG-Porsche V6 engine. He lost the world championship to Lauda in the final race of the season in Portugal by half a point, despite winning seven races to Lauda's five, including winning in Portugal. The half point came from the Monaco Grand Prix, where Prost had been leading, albeit with Ayrton Senna (Toleman) and Stefan Bellof (Tyrrell) closing on him rapidly, when Clerk of the Course Jacky Ickx stopped the race at half distance due to heavy rain, which was controversial, for Ickx displayed the red flag without consulting the race officials. Under Formula One regulations, Prost received only half of the nine points normally awarded for a victory. Prost's seven wins in 1984 equalled the record set by Jim Clark in 1963. Lauda's 0.5-point margin of victory is the closest title race in Formula One history.

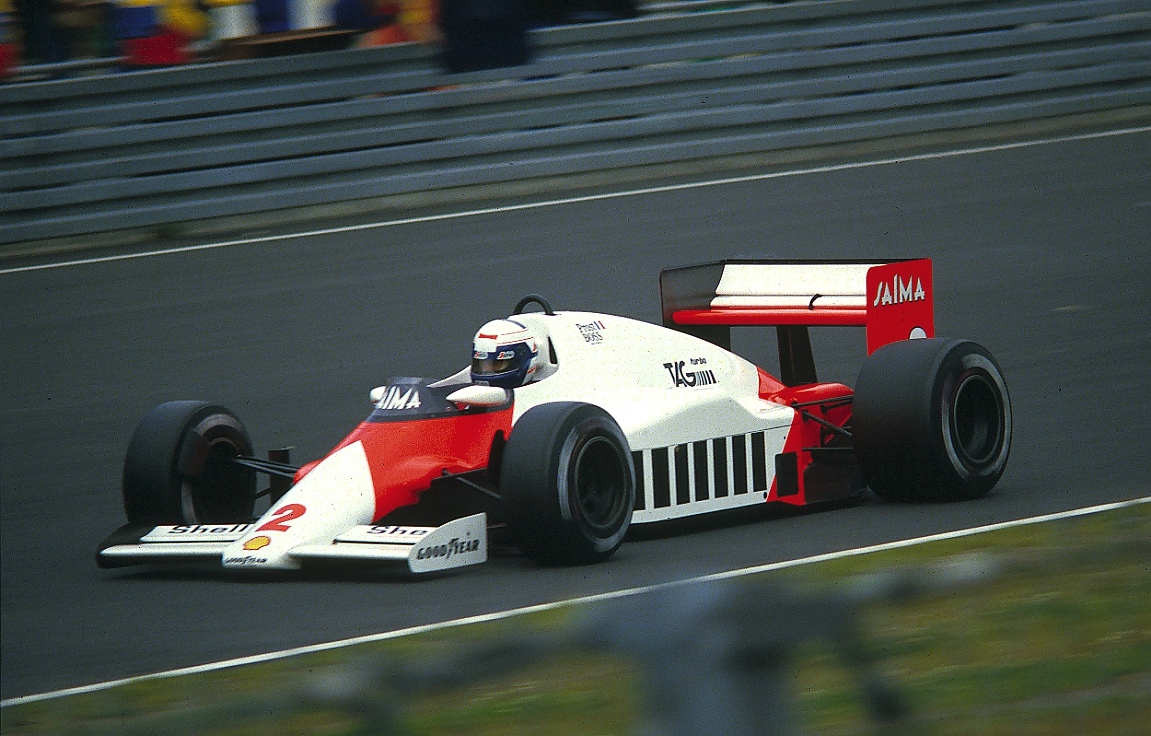
Prost driving the McLaren MP4/2B at the 1985 German Grand Prix

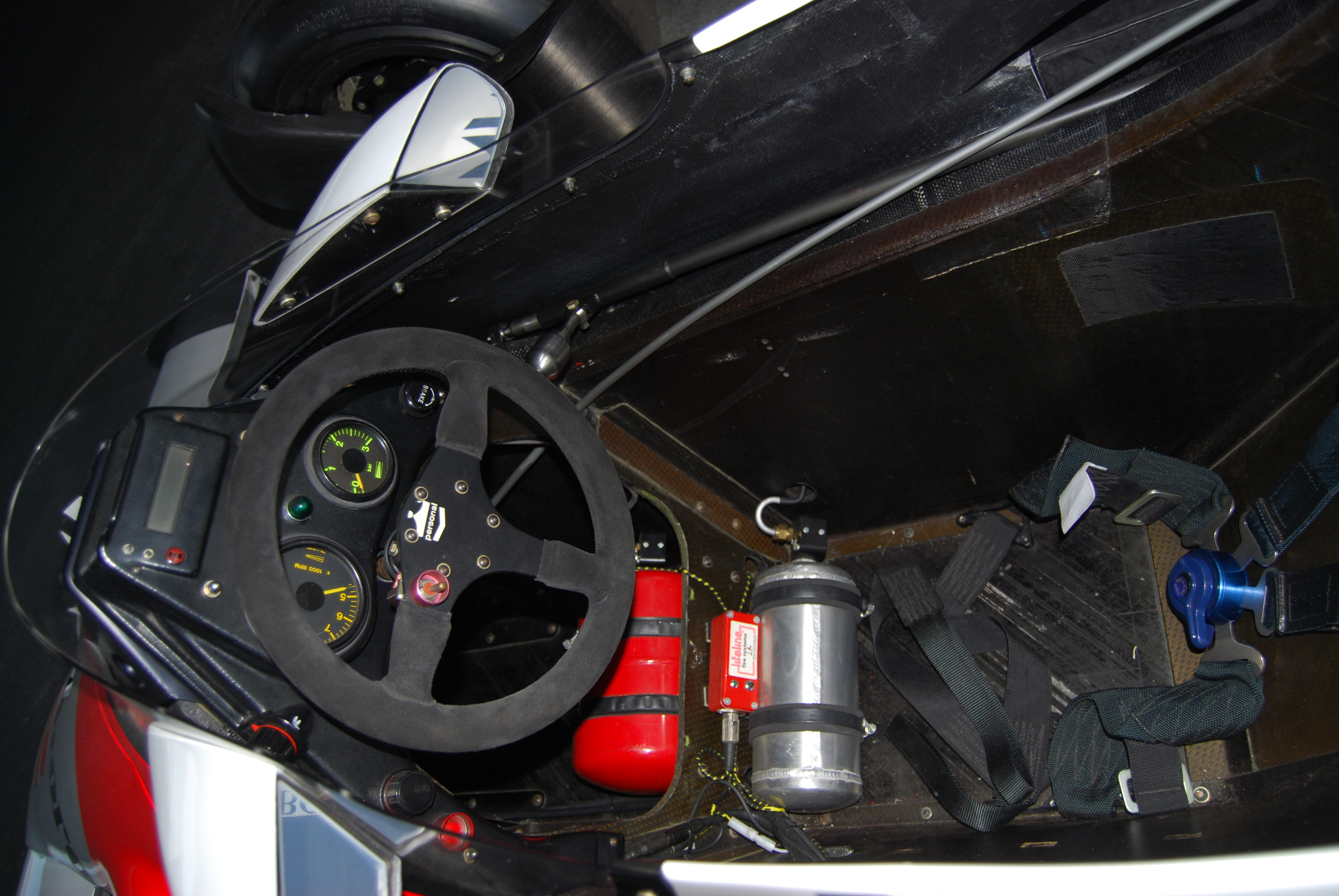
Cockpit of Prost's F1 McLaren TAG-Porsche turbo, from his first Championship year

In 1985, Prost became the first French Formula One World Champion. He won five of the sixteen Grands Prix during the season. He had also won the San Marino Grand Prix, but was disqualified after his car was found to be 2 kg underweight in post-race scrutineering. Prost finished 20 points ahead of his closest rival, Michele Alboreto. Prost's performance in 1985 earned him the Légion d'honneur distinction in France. At the end of the season, Lauda retired; he would later credit Prost with sending him into retirement, explaining that "I had this perfect car, and then this French pain-in-the-ass arrives and blows me away. If he hadn't turned up I'd have gone on for another few years."

Lauda was replaced at McLaren by 1982 World Champion Keke Rosberg for 1986. Prost successfully defended his title, despite his car struggling against the Honda-powered Williams cars driven by Nelson Piquet and Nigel Mansell. Until the latter stages of the final race of the 1986 season, the Australian Grand Prix, Prost appeared set to finish second in the Championship, behind Mansell. Prost had the same number of wins as Piquet, but he had four second places to Piquet's three, thus placing him second before the final race. While running third behind Piquet, and directly behind Prost on the road (3rd was all he needed to win the title), Mansell suffered a rear tyre failure at 180 mph (290 km/h) and crashed out. The Williams team then pitted Piquet to change tyres as a safety precaution, while Prost had already pitted earlier due to a puncture and did not need to change his tyres again. He then held the lead ahead of a charging Piquet to the chequered flag and the championship. Prost became the first driver to retain the title since Jack Brabham in 1960.

Another memorable race that year for Prost was at the San Marino Grand Prix. He was cruising to victory when his car began to run out of fuel three corners from the chequered flag. Frantically weaving the car back and forth to slosh the last drops of fuel into the pickup, he managed to keep it running just long enough to creep over the line and win the race. Prost commented after the race that when his car started running dry he immediately thought to himself "shit, I am going to lose this race again", referring to his 1985 disqualification at Imola. It happened again at the German Grand Prix: while running in fourth position, Prost's car ran out of fuel on the finishing straight of the last lap. Instead of retiring at a time in the season when points were critical, Prost got out of his car and tried to push it to the finish, to great applause from the crowd. The finish line was too far, though, and he never reached it. He was eventually classified sixth in the race, as the seventh-placed car (the Brabham-BMW of Derek Warwick) was a lap behind. Prost also finished sixth at the Belgian Grand Prix, where he collided with Gerhard Berger in the Benetton. As a result, the car's front suspension and engine mountings were bent, which badly affected its handling. It would behave one way in left hand corners and a completely different way in right hand corners. McLaren Technical Director John Barnard said afterwards that the car was "bent like a banana" upon the teams' post-race inspection of the car.

==== 1987 ====
With Rosberg retiring from Formula One at the end of 1986 season, Swedish driver Stefan Johansson filled the McLaren seat alongside Prost for the 1987 season. Even though McLaren had introduced the new Steve Nichols designed MP4/3 after three seasons with the MP4/2 model (Barnard had departed for Ferrari), the TAG engines were not the force they had been previously, lagging behind in power and with unreliability previously unseen. He never gave up though and challenged Piquet and Mansell almost until the end, winning three races and breaking Jackie Stewart's record for race victories by winning for the 28th time at the Portuguese Grand Prix. "People might not believe me," said Stewart at the time. "But I'm glad to see Alain take my record. I am glad that he has done it because he's the one that deserves it. There is no doubt in my mind that he is the best race driver of his generation." Prost considers his win in the opening round in Brazil as his best and most rewarding race ever. The Williams-Hondas had been dominant during qualifying, and Prost started fifth on the grid with a time three seconds slower than Mansell's pole time. Knowing he did not have the qualifying speed, he instead worked on his race set-up, and with everyone else going for a high-downforce set-up, he went the other way. The set-up meant less tyre wear, thanks to slower speeds in the corners while going fast down the straights. With his car having less tyre wear than his rivals, Prost was able to get through the 61 laps of the abrasive Jacarepaguá Circuit with only two stops compared to the three or more by his rivals (Piquet pitted for tyres 3 times within the first 40 laps). Prost finished 40 seconds in front of Piquet, with Johansson a further 16 seconds back in third.

When you win a race like this the feeling is very, very good. There have been times when I have been flat-out to finish sixth, but you can't see that from the outside. In 1980 I finished three or four times in seventh place. I pushed like mad, yet everyone was gathered around the winner and they were thinking that I was just trundling around. But that's motor racing. So in fact the only thing you can judge in this sport is the long term. You can judge a career or a season, but not one race.

Prost finished the 1987 season in fourth place in the championship behind Piquet, Mansell and Lotus driver Ayrton Senna. Prost finished 30 points behind champion Nelson Piquet. Other than his debut season in 1980 and 1991, it was the furthest away he would finish a season from the championship lead.

Despite a slightly disappointing 1987 season, nevertheless by the end of that year Prost had the honour of notching up his fourth consecutive No. 1 driver of the year by the editor of the Autocourse annual, matching Niki Lauda's run of No.1's from 1975 to 1978 in the same annual. Writing in 1987, the Autocourse editor mentioned that despite driving a down on power engine (compared to the Honda's) "Prost should have won at least 6 races in 1987 – but he won't moan about it. Despite being out of championship contention, 1987 was a memorable year for Prost. His win at Estoril was exceptional." In 1985, the Autocourse editor wrote of Prost: "In the long run, Ayrton Senna may be the better driver, but in 1985 for speed and consistency Prost had no equal", while in 1986, the Autocourse editor commented on Prost's season "Alain had an almost faultless year. 1986 was a year of Prost's outstanding all round ability."

==== 1988 ====
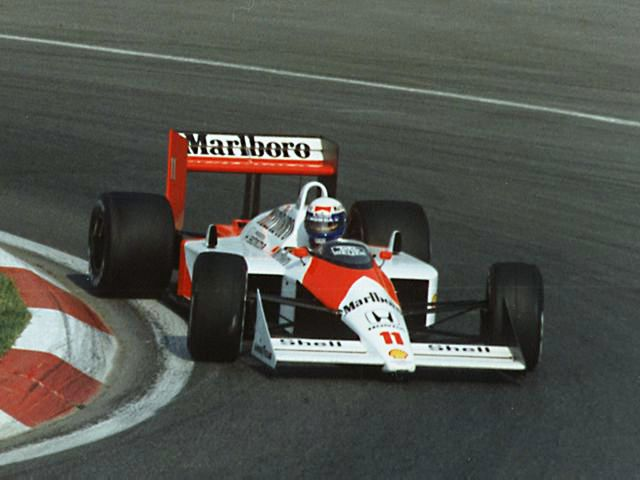
Prost driving for McLaren at the 1988 Canadian Grand Prix

The 1988 season proved to be a watershed moment for Formula One, as Honda ended its relationship with defending champion Williams and brought their all-conquering RA16 engines to Prost's McLaren. Going into 1988, it was understood that any team that wanted Honda engines would have to sign one of the two Brazilian drivers favored by Honda (which coveted the South American car market): three-time world champion Nelson Piquet, or rising star Ayrton Senna. When McLaren asked Prost for his opinion, Prost suggested Senna, citing his youth and talent. It was a decision he would come to regret.

Upon signing Senna, McLaren announced that Prost and Senna would compete on equal terms. According to Dennis, "Alain was fine with the competition, but deeply suspicious."

The McLaren-Honda partnership delivered Prost a fast car and two golden opportunities for a third Drivers' Championship, but it also kicked off one of Formula One's most famous rivalries. McLaren-Honda dominated the season, winning 15 out of 16 races – a record that stood until the 2023 season, when Red Bull-Honda won 21 out of 22 races. McLaren scored three times as many points as second-placed Ferrari. Reflecting the dominance of Honda power, Williams finished a distant seventh in the Constructors' Championship just one year after winning the title by 61 points.

At the end of the season, Senna took the title by just three points, scoring eight wins, one more than Prost's seven. Senna nearly shunted an overtaking Prost into the pit wall at Estoril, but other than that, the two competitors generally raced cleanly on track that year.

Over the course of the 1988 season, Prost began to suspect that Honda was trying to make Senna McLaren's number one driver, in violation of McLaren's promise to treat the two drivers equally. He met with Honda F1 boss Nobuhiko Kawamoto at the end of the season to express these concerns. Kawamoto acknowledged that Honda's engineers were probably more excited to work with Senna than Prost, but said that he intended to deliver Prost equal machinery on race day. However, following the 1988 season, Kawamoto was promoted to a position at Honda headquarters.

==== 1989 ====
McLaren's domination continued throughout 1989, and with no meaningful outside competition, Prost and Senna's title fight turned inwards. Prost accused Senna of dangerous driving and dishonorable behavior. After Imola, the two drivers were no longer on speaking terms.

Prost also accused Senna of receiving unwarranted favoritism from McLaren-Honda. His suspicions were inflamed when Honda sent McLaren an engine crate marked "Special - For Ayrton." After Prost (who was in the last year of his contract with McLaren) threatened to join a rival team at the end of the season, Ron Dennis publicly backed Prost against Honda, "declar[ing] that the team had found consistent differences" between the engines that Honda assigned to Senna and Prost. To accommodate Prost's concerns, Dennis attempted to allocate engines on a random basis, such as a coin flip or drawing numbers from a hat.

Matters came to a head at the Italian Grand Prix, where Prost burned his bridges with both McLaren and Honda. In advance of the Italian Grand Prix, he announced that he would drive for Ferrari in 1990. Following his announcement, McLaren provided full support to Senna's title chase. Although Prost was the championship leader and would have been the natural candidate for priority, at Monza McLaren gave Prost one car and four or five mechanics, while Senna received two cars and 20 assistants. In addition, while the new Honda F1 leadership publicly stated that Prost was getting the same equipment as Senna, Prost publicly rejected Honda's reassurances. After Senna outqualified Prost by a mammoth +1.790 seconds, Prost once again complained about Honda to the press. Insulted, Honda threatened to withdraw its engines from Prost's car unless Prost apologized, which he did. Ultimately, Prost won at Monza while Senna retired with an engine issue, giving Prost a commanding 20-point lead in the Drivers' Championship. Prost threw salt in the wound by dropping his winner's trophy into the crowd of cheering Ferrari fans who promptly tore it apart, causing Ron Dennis to storm out of the podium ceremony in anger. McLaren subsequently instituted a policy that all trophies were to be property of the team, with drivers permitted to request replicas.

Following the tumult of the weekend, Senna encouraged McLaren to fire Prost immediately, and Ferrari offered to accommodate the move by switching Prost with Ferrari's Gerhard Berger for the final four weeks of the season. Cooler heads prevailed, and McLaren allowed Prost to finish the season with the team in exchange for a public, written apology. This concession eliminated the possibility that Prost would clinch the 1989 title in a Ferrari car. Years later, Prost commissioned a replica of the Italian Grand Prix winner's trophy and gave it to Ron Dennis.

Prost clinched his third Drivers' Championship at the Japanese Grand Prix, the penultimate race of the season. Prost was 16 points ahead of Senna at the time, meaning that Senna needed to win the last two races. By contrast, Prost would automatically become the champion if Senna retired from either race, which was precisely what happened. Prost and Senna collided with seven laps to go, and Prost was widely blamed for causing the collision. (Prost was leading the race at the time and refused to leave a gap on the inside. Senna's normal practice was to line up his car for a crash and dare the other driver to back off, and as expected, Senna refused to yield and collided with Prost's car.) Senna managed to restart his car and win the race, but the FIA (led by Prost's countryman Jean-Marie Balestre, whom Senna disliked) disqualified him for missing the chicane, fined him US$100,000 for "dangerous driving," and handed him a suspended six-month ban.

Following the race, Prost admitted that "I know everybody thinks I did it on purpose," but rationalized that "Senna came behind me, I didn't see him come and I couldn't do anything to avoid him. I am very sorry to have to finish[ed] the championship on such an incident." He later said that he knew Senna would attempt to pass him at the chicane, and while "I did not [crash] on purpose, I did not open the door." McLaren, now fully behind Senna, unsuccessfully appealed the disqualification, which Sports Illustrated characterized as Ron Dennis "objecting to his [own] driver's winning the world title."

=== Ferrari (1990–1991) ===
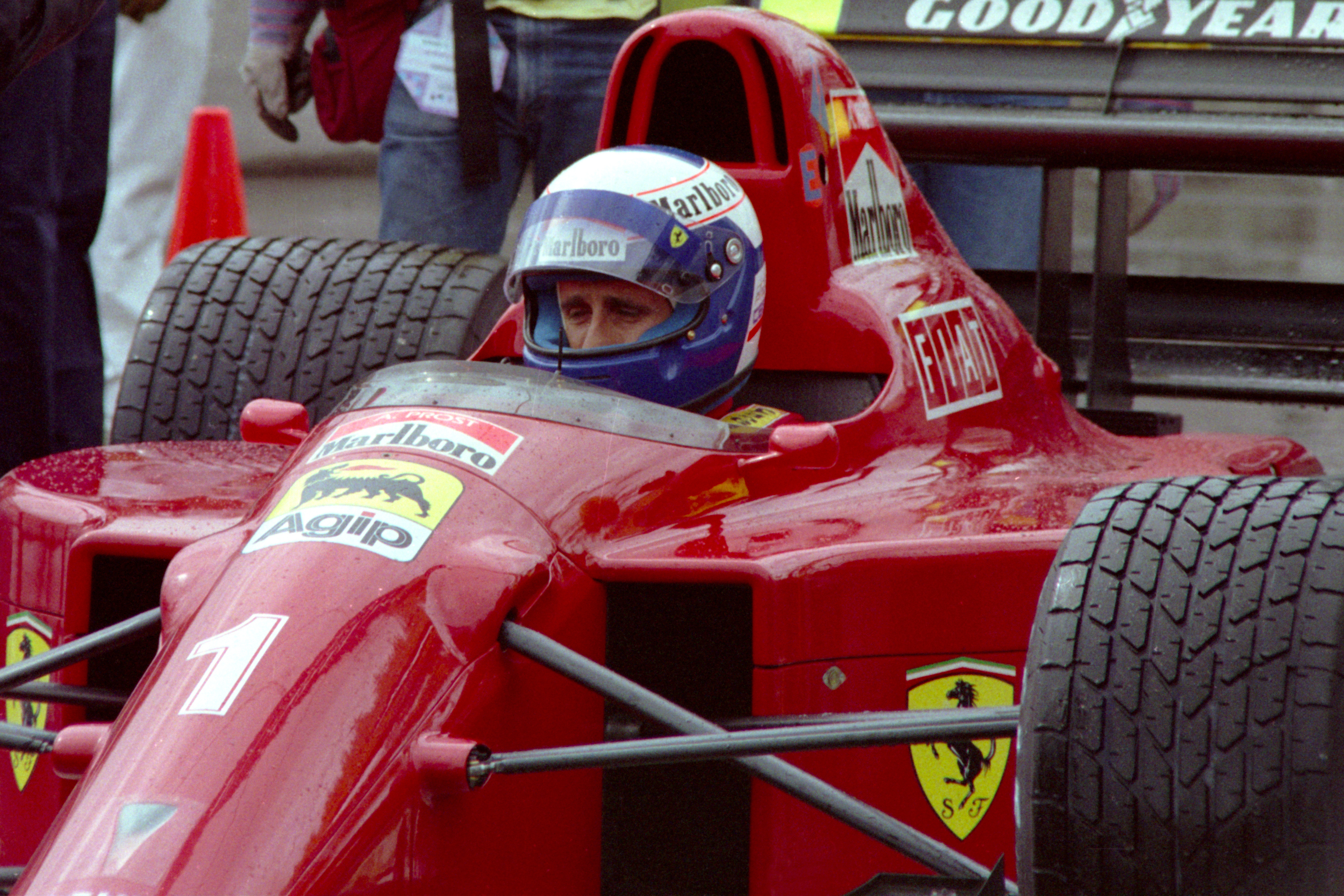
Prost practising for his first event for Ferrari, the 1990 United States Grand Prix

In 1990, Prost became the first Ferrari driver to sign for the Scuderia after the death of team founder Enzo Ferrari in 1988. Ferrari had lured away several McLaren chassis designers over the years, including John Barnard and Steve Nichols. The 1990 Ferrari 641 was the first car to seriously threaten Honda's stranglehold on the Constructors' Championship, as Ferrari came within 11 points of the title. Prost won five races for Ferrari that year, in Brazil, Mexico, France, Britain and Spain. At Mexico, he accomplished one of his finest drives, winning the race after starting in 13th position. In both the Mexican and Spanish races, he led Mansell to Ferrari 1–2 finishes.

The championship once again came to the penultimate round of the season in Japan, but this time the roles were reversed, with Prost trailing McLaren-Honda's Senna by nine points. As in 1989, a controversial collision between the two settled the race. At the first corner of the first lap, Senna intentionally drove his car into Prost's, taking them both out of the race and sealing the title in his favour. Dennis immediately knew that Senna had purposely crashed Prost out of the race, but it took a year for Senna to admit that the crash was intentional; in 1991, he disclosed that he crashed into Prost in part to retaliate for Prost's actions in 1989. Although Prost complained loudly about Senna's manoeuvre, saying that "What he did today was absolutely disgusting. ... He has no value [as a person]," Senna was not penalized. Prost finished the season seven points behind Senna, and his Ferrari team were runners-up to McLaren in the Constructors' Championship.

At the end of the season, Mansell left the Scuderia to rejoin a resurgent Williams team, citing his unstable relationship with Prost. Although Mansell had supported Prost during the 1989 Prost-Honda controversy, as reigning world champion, Prost had joined Ferrari as the team's lead driver and was said to have played on this status. (According to Mansell, Ferrari contractually guaranteed him number one driver status, but once Prost became available, Ferrari paid Mansell to let Prost be the number one driver.) Mansell said that after watching him take pole in France with a purportedly superior chassis, Prost secretly demanded that Ferrari give him Mansell's car for the next race in Britain. Mansell was replaced by Frenchman Jean Alesi.

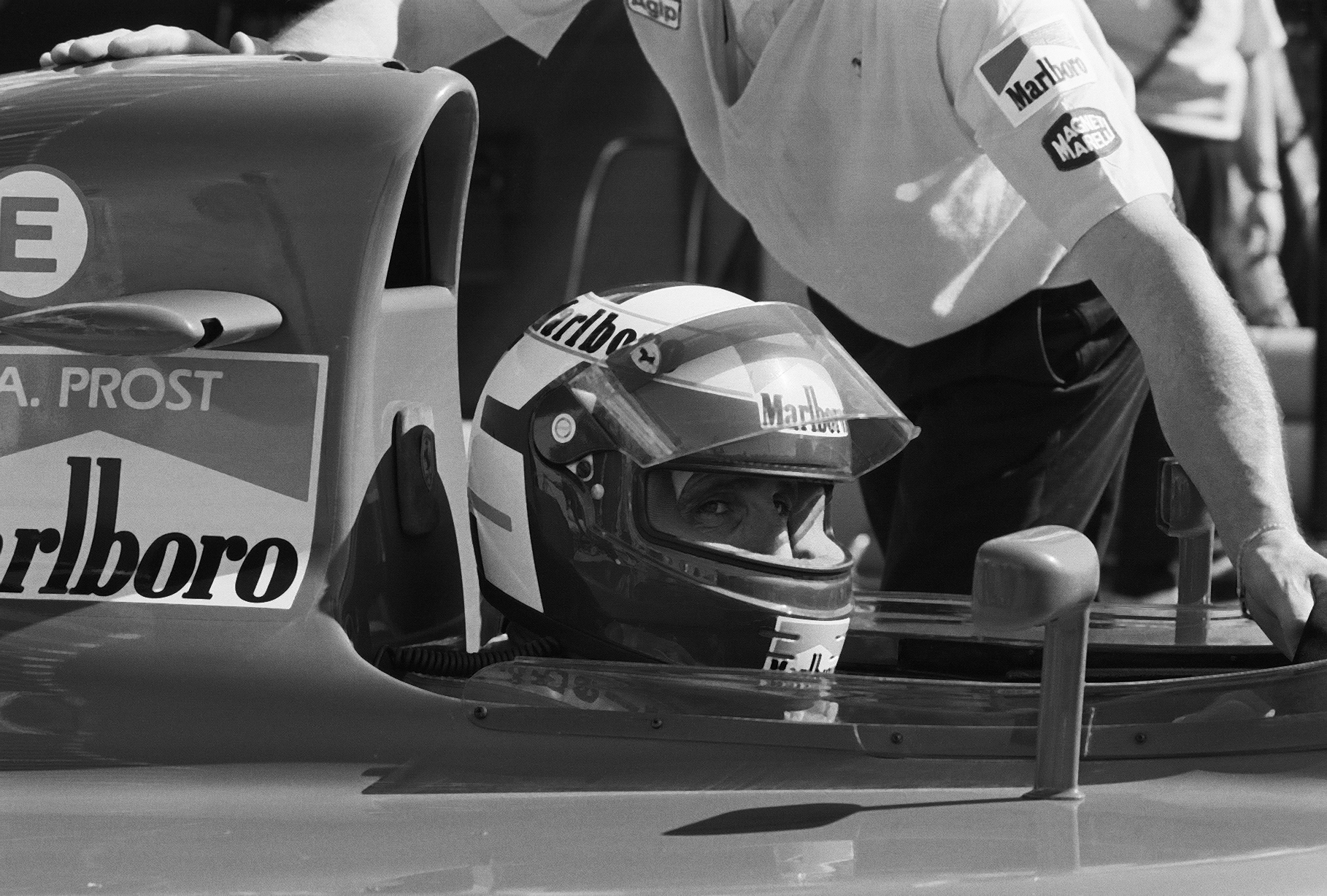
Prost at the 1991 United States Grand Prix

The 1991 season was not as kind to Ferrari, as the Ferrari 642 was not as reliable as the McLaren and Williams cars. Prost never finished a race lower than fifth, but won no races, scored only five podiums, and finished only eight races; similarly, Alesi finished only seven races. Reportedly, Ferrari's V12 engine was no longer competitive against the smaller, lighter and more fuel efficient V10s of its competitors, and the Ferrari chassis was likewise uncompetitive. (Barnard had left Ferrari in 1990, early enough to have input on the 1990 car but too late to help with the 1991 cars.) Although Ferrari upgraded the car to the Ferrari 643 in time for Prost's home race at Magny-Cours, in which Prost and Alesi finished second and fourth, the car was still unable to compete for the title over the course of the season. Adding insult to injury, Mansell's Williams-Renault clearly supplanted Ferrari as McLaren-Honda's main competition in 1991, and Mansell finished second in the Drivers' Championship that year.

Prost took out his frustrations on the team, publicly likening the car to a "truck." Ferrari retaliated by firing him with one race left to go in the 1991 season. He was replaced by Italian driver Gianni Morbidelli for the 1991 Australian Grand Prix and by another Italian, Ivan Capelli, for the following season.

=== Williams (1993) ===
Prost spent the 1992 season on sabbatical. Ligier offered him a seat, and he eventually performed pre-season testing for the team in early 1992, but Ferrari paid him a significant amount of money to take the year off. During this season, Nigel Mansell put up record numbers in the Williams-Renault and won the title with five races remaining. The McLaren-Honda combination was waning: due to economic difficulties in Japan, Honda was not in position to outspend Renault on engine development. Honda opted to leave Formula One at season's end rather than carry on with a second-tier product. With no meaningful competition, a Williams driver was expected to cruise to the title again in 1993.

Prost quickly recognized the potential of the Williams car and began negotiating with Frank Williams for a 1993 ride no later than the second race of the 1992 season. He ultimately signed a two-year contract for 1993 and 1994. The Williams second driver, Riccardo Patrese, realized his seat was under threat so he signed for the Benetton team before the end of the year. Prost had expected to race alongside Mansell, but Mansell's contract negotiations fell through due to Mansell's increased financial demands as well as Williams suggesting that they were ready to sign Senna if Mansell hesitated. Senna was unable to make a deal with Williams, since Prost had negotiated a clause in his contract which prevented Senna from joining the team. Although Senna furiously accused Prost of cowardice, there was nothing he could do about it.

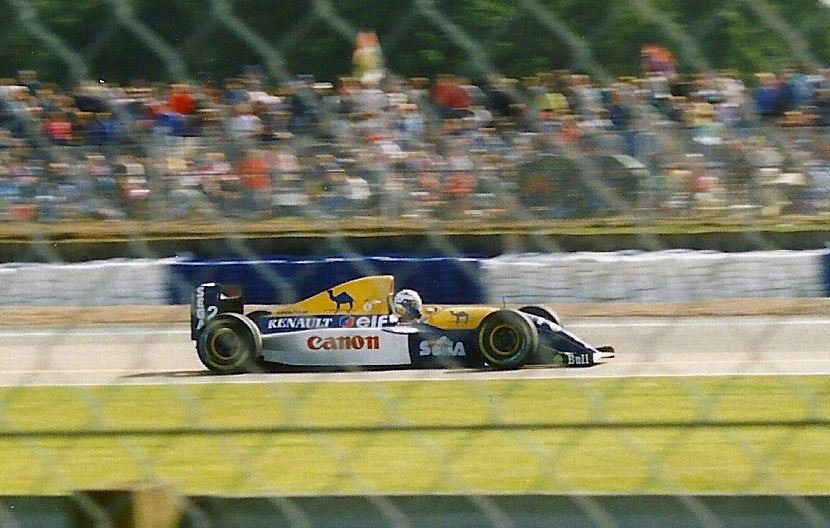
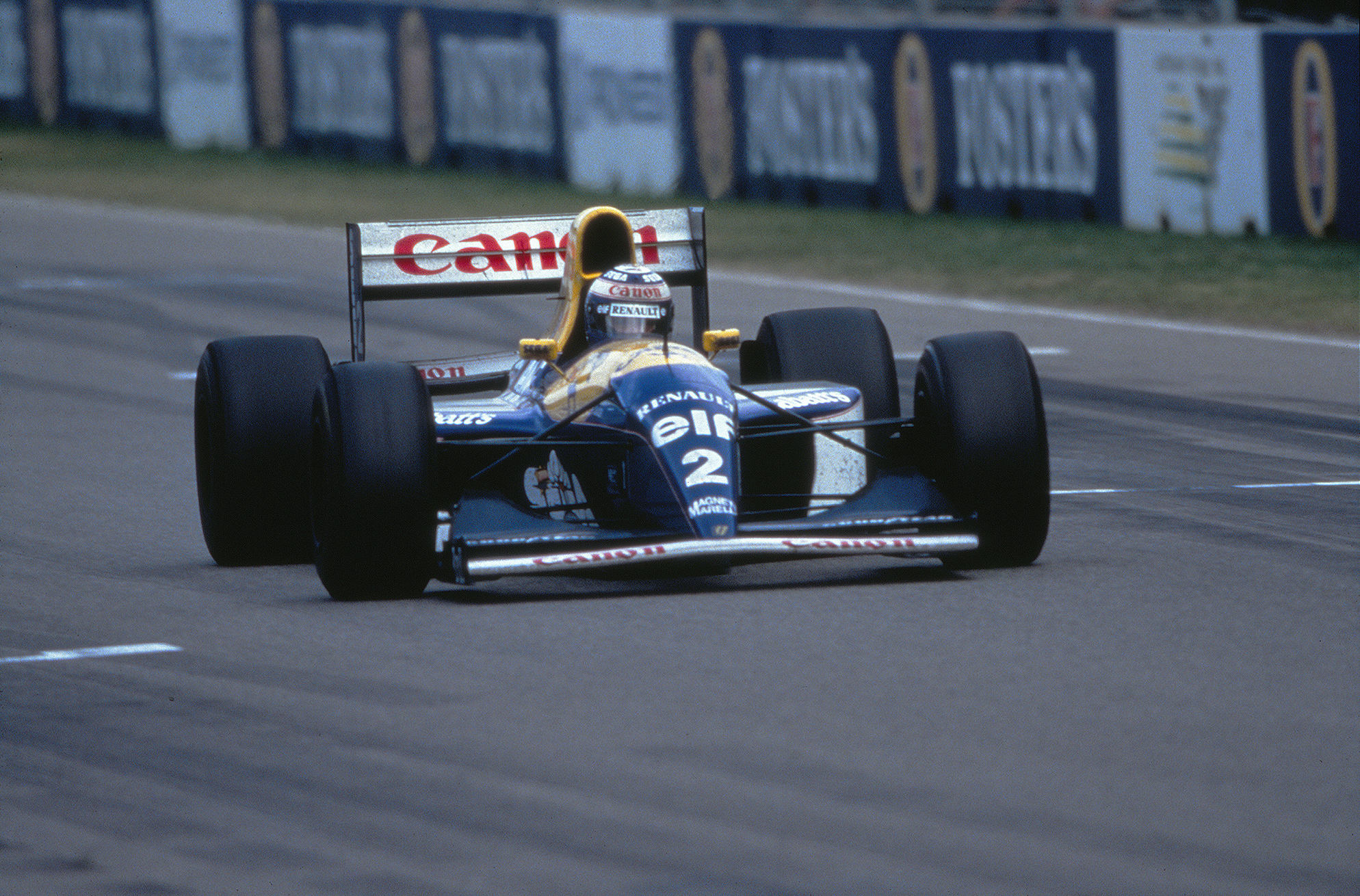
Prost driving his 1993 Williams-Renault FW15C at Silverstone (left) and Adelaide (right)

Prost won his fourth and final title in 1993, partnering with Damon Hill who had been promoted from test driver. Traditionally, the reigning driver's World Champion carried the number "1" on his car and his teammate took the number "2". Because Mansell, the 1992 champion, was not racing in Formula One in 1993, Williams as Constructors' Champion were given numbers "0" and "2", being assigned to Hill and Prost, respectively. That year, Williams-Renault fielded another dominant car and handily defended the Constructors' Championship, finishing with twice as many points as second-placed McLaren. Prost led the way, winning seven of the first ten races and taking pole in thirteen out of sixteen races. Although he was regularly challenged on track by teammate Hill and rival Senna, he finished 26 points ahead of the second-placed Senna and clinched the title in Portugal with two races to go. At season's end, the British government awarded Prost an OBE for his performances; he had won all four of his titles with British teams.

Shortly before securing the title, Prost announced he would retire at the end of the season. At the time, he stated that under the terms of his Williams contract, while he could block Senna from joining Williams in 1993, he could not do so for 1994. However, in an interview for Asif Kapadia's 2010 documentary Senna, Prost revealed that the Senna clause did in fact extend to 1994, but Renault (Williams' engine supplier) pressured Frank Williams to ask Prost to waive the clause. As a compromise, the 38-year-old Prost agreed to retire after the 1993 season, provided that Williams paid him his agreed-upon salary for the 1994 season. This cleared the way for Senna to join Williams in 1994.

Prost finished on the podium in his final race (Adelaide 1993). Following the race, Senna embraced him, which Prost found surprising, as Senna had declined a handshake at the previous race. McLaren, having signed a deal with to use Peugeot engines, tempted Prost to unretire by offering him Senna's old seat for the 1994 season, but while Senna encouraged Prost to take the offer, Prost was unimpressed by a test-drive of the 1994 car and retired for good.

=== Helmet ===
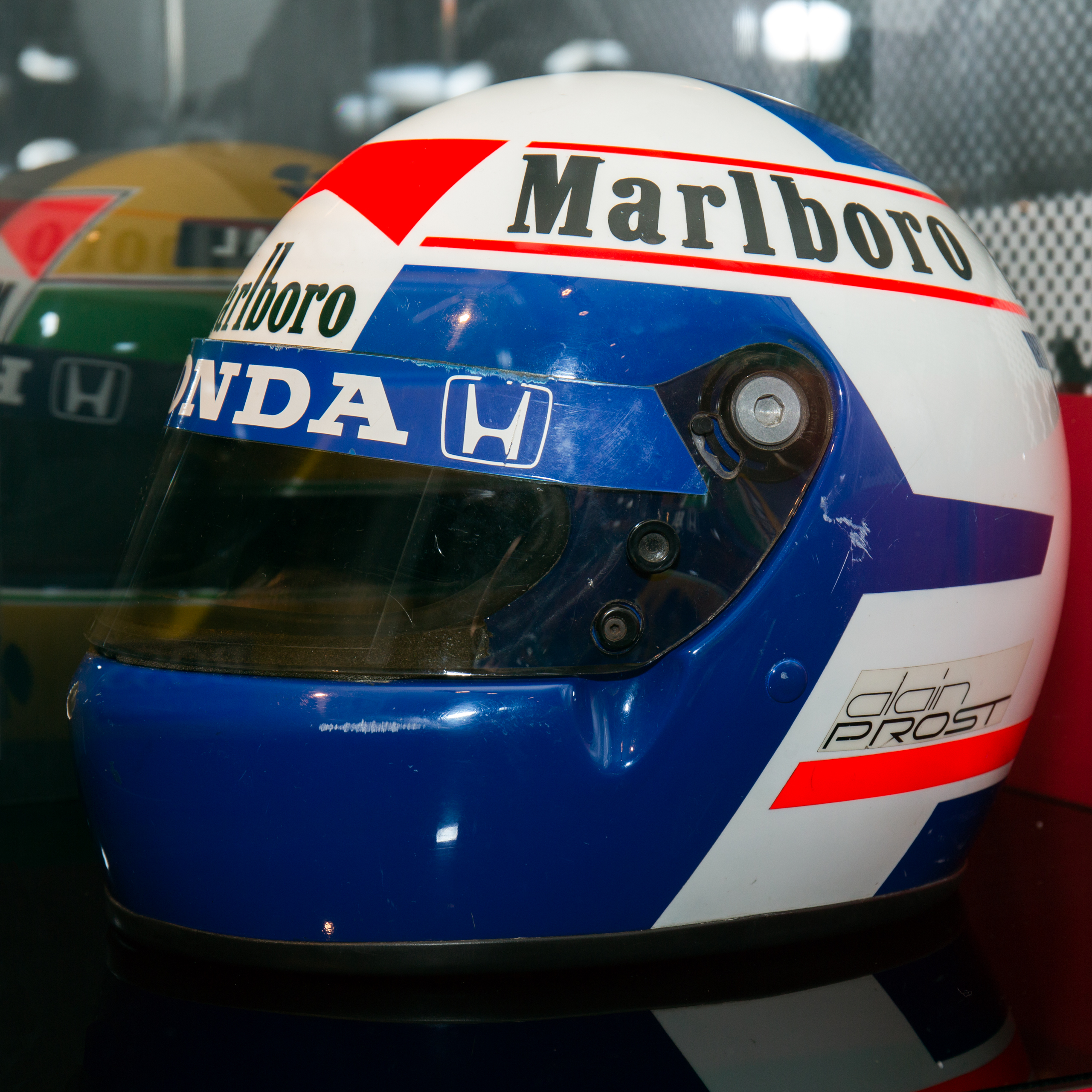
Prost's helmet for the 1988 Formula One season

Prost used a helmet design based on the three colours of the French flag, blue, white and red, with his name along the side. During his early career Prost used a basic design of white all over with some blue detail around the visor (blue helmet with a white 180° flipped Y and red lines in the lower branch of the flipped Y and in the upper branch, surrounding the top). During Prost's time at Renault, he used more blue details, most notably around the rear of his helmet. Prost's helmet changed in 1985, as his helmet now had the blue detail around the front, surrounding the visor (with also a blue stripe on the side region, making the white area become a P) and a white ring with red lines surrounding the top (forming a white circle with a blue half in the rear of the top). Prost kept a similar design for his entry at Ferrari and Williams. Sometimes Prost used variants of his helmet design. In 2007 he used his original design, but with the circle top all red and a red line in the lower chin area. In 2010, he used a pearl white helmet with silver flames and a blue-white-red-white-blue stripe on the visor, designed by Kaos Design.

== Career legacy ==
Prost is widely regarded as one of Formula One's greatest-ever drivers. He is tied with Sebastian Vettel and Max Verstappen for the fourth-most Drivers' Championships of all time with four, behind only Lewis Hamilton, Michael Schumacher, and Juan Manuel Fangio. In addition, he was just 12.5 points away from an eight-title career. At his retirement, Prost held the record for most career Grand Prix victories (51), which stood for fourteen years. (Michael Schumacher broke Prost's record during the 2001 season. For his own part, Prost believed that had Ayrton Senna not died in 1994, he would have broken Prost's wins record first.) In addition, while Senna held the record for most career pole positions at Prost's retirement, Prost was superb on race day and held the record for most career fastest laps (41) until 2001, when Schumacher broke that record as well.

Prost currently shares the record for the highest percentage of races started from the front row in a single season (16 for 16 in 1993) with Ayrton Senna (1989) and Damon Hill (1996). As of 2026, he is the last Frenchman to have won his home Grand Prix.

=== Driving style ===
During his career, Prost was nicknamed "The Professor" for his intellectual approach to competition. Though it was not a name he particularly cared for, he later admitted that the term appropriately characterized his driving style. Skilled at setting up his car for race conditions, Prost would often conserve his brakes and tyres early in a race, leaving them fresher for a challenge at the end. His mantra was to "win as slowly as possible," a phrase he may have picked up from his teammate Niki Lauda, or Juan Manuel Fangio. Honda F1 boss Nobuhiko Kawamoto once told Prost that Ayrton Senna "was more the samurai, and [Prost] was more the computer."

In contrast to Senna, who had a "tendency to go flat out all the time," Prost employed a smooth, relaxed style behind the wheel, deliberately modelling himself on personal heroes like Jackie Stewart and Jim Clark. Although Prost may not have driven as stylishly as his contemporaries – Nigel Mansell once said that Prost merely "chauffeur[ed]" the best car on the grid – Stewart praised Prost for his silkiness behind the wheel, explaining, "To some, that's boring; to me, it's artistry - and so much more difficult than just throwing a car about." Prost's calmness allowed him to get the most out of an engine without driving it to failure. Clive James wrote that Prost "was considered uncanny even by the other drivers for the way his cars held together: it was as if he could hear what was going on in the engine. Prost was the car's friend. Other drivers treated the car no more tactfully than they treated women." However, his approach had some critics, including Ron Dennis, who was upset that Prost declined to go for the win at Spa in 1985. Prost responded that "I've lost the championship at the last moment so many times I'm not taking any chances." Prost was stung by the criticism, which he summarized as "when you win ... it's normal, when you lose, you're stupid."

Prost's smooth style sometimes masked his raw pace on track. Steve Nichols, Prost's car designer at McLaren and Ferrari, said that at the 1985 Belgian Grand Prix, he watched Prost calmly circle the track three times, and did not realize that Prost had taken pole position until after he went back to the garage. Nigel Roebuck told a similar story about a Prost pole position at Monaco. Adrian Newey, Prost's car designer at Williams, said that Prost sometimes frustrated him in testing because Prost rarely pushed the car to the limit, making it harder for Newey to figure out whether the car was quick enough. Newey added that "when he wanted to, he could turn it on." Although Senna crushed Prost in qualifying during their 32 races together, taking 26 poles to Prost's 4, on race day Prost scored 12 fastest laps to Senna's 6.

Although Senna outshone Prost's qualifying pace, Prost was also an underrated qualifier. Niki Lauda remarked that when Prost joined McLaren in 1984, Prost was so quick that Lauda quit trying to match Prost in qualifying and used his track time to set up his car for the race. Prost internalized those lessons and used them against Senna in 1988 and 1989.

=== Team moves ===
Prost also understood the importance of racing in top machinery; McLaren's website comments that he "built his long career on making the right move at the right time." However, once Prost found his way into a winning team, he was not always deft with his relationships with teams and engine suppliers. Formula One's website notes that while Prost "made winning races [] look easy," he "was less successful at the politics in which he was invariably embroiled," and he "left teams acrimoniously on four occasions."

Prost's teammate at Ferrari, Nigel Mansell, recalls one incident where at the 1990 British Grand Prix, the car he drove did not handle the same as in the previous race where he had taken pole position. On confronting the mechanics, it transpired that Prost saw Mansell as having a superior car and as a result, they were swapped without telling Mansell. Prost also spoke fluent Italian, whereas Mansell's Italian was only conversational at best, gave Prost greater influence within the Maranello-based team. According to Prost, Mansell only attended two or three mechanical briefings throughout the season, preferring playing golf. Prost precipitated his 1991 firing from Ferrari by openly criticizing the handling of the car, and took the 1992 season off (by accepting a significant amount of money from Ferrari) rather than take up a drive with second-tier Ligier.

By the second race of the 1992 season, Prost quickly recognized the potential of the Williams-Renault combination and negotiated a seat for the 1993 and 1994 seasons. Having announced his retirement effective at the end of the 1993 season (not wanting to partner Senna in 1994, with Williams agreeing to pay Prost's 1994 salary), Prost decided not to unretire after being unimpressed by a test-drive of the McLaren-Peugeot for the 1994 season. After Senna was killed at the 1994 San Marino Grand Prix, Prost was the obvious candidate to take up the vacant seat at Williams, but Prost said that out of respect to Senna he would not race in Formula One again.

=== Appraisals by contemporaries ===
In 2009, an Autosport survey taken by 217 Formula One drivers saw Prost voted as the fourth greatest Formula One driver of all time, behind Senna, Schumacher, and Fangio. Prost's teammate Keke Rosberg said that "He's the best I've ever known, no question about it. As an all-round race driver he's head and shoulders clear of anyone else." Formula One CEO Bernie Ecclestone said that Prost was the greatest driver of all time, as Prost rarely enjoyed number one driver treatment, unlike Senna or Schumacher. In 2023, Ecclestone said that Max Verstappen had surpassed Prost. Jordan team boss Eddie Jordan shared Ecclestone's opinion, appreciating that Prost "never minded who his teammate was" (Senna being a notable exception). Formula One medical chief Sid Watkins said that Prost and Niki Lauda were the most intelligent drivers he had worked with, noting that he could recall only one dangerous auto accident involving Prost in his career.

=== Quantitative ratings ===
Various outlets have attempted to develop models that objectively measure driver skill relative to car quality. Prost generally places highly in these comparisons.

- University of Sheffield (2016): Second all-time
- The Economist (2020): Third all-time
- Carteret Analytics (2020): Eighth all-time
- F1-Analysis.com (2022): Fourth all-time; second all-time after correcting for era differences

=== Rivalry with Ayrton Senna ===
Prost's battles with Ayrton Senna were widely covered. The two drivers were intense competitors and contributed to several on-track incidents:

- Estoril 1988 (Senna tried to stop Prost from passing him by threatening to sideswipe him into the pit wall)
- Imola 1989 (Senna and Prost agreed to avoid racing each other too closely on the first lap, but disagreed on the precise terms of the agreement, after which Prost complained to the media)
- Suzuka 1989 (driving side by side with Senna, Prost clinched the Drivers' Championship by turning into Senna's path on the inside line and daring him to brake or crash)
- Suzuka 1990 (driving side by side with Prost, Senna clinched the Drivers' Championship by intentionally crashing Prost out of the race in retaliation for the 1989 incident)
- Hockenheim 1991 (Senna ran Prost off the track and onto the escape road).

Following the 1991 Hockenheim incident, the FISA ordered a sit-down meeting between the two men to cool tensions and prevent further incidents.

In addition, the two drivers both found themselves chasing the same race seat after the 1992 season, as Ferrari's performance had declined and Honda left Formula One, leaving Williams-Renault as the unquestioned ruler of Formula One. Prost signed for Williams on the condition that Senna was not also signed, prompting Senna to publicly complain that Prost was "behaving like a coward." Senna's Brazilian fans were so enraged by Prost's refusal to race with Senna on equal terms that Prost received a police escort for the 1993 Brazilian Grand Prix. Prost comfortably won the 1993 title and retired at season's end, allowing Senna to take the lead at Williams in 1994.

Once they were no longer competitors, the two rivals began mending their relationship. At Prost's last Grand Prix, the 1993 Australian Grand Prix, Senna pulled him onto the top step of the podium for an embrace. Only a couple of days before Senna's untimely death at Imola, when filming an in-car lap of Imola for French television channel TF1, he greeted Prost, by then a pundit on the channel: "A special hello to my...to our dear friend, Alain. We all miss you Alain." Prost said that he was amazed and very touched by the comment. Prost was a pallbearer at Senna's funeral, and commented that when Senna died "a part of himself had died also", because their careers had been so closely bound together. Senna felt similarly, admitting to a close friend that after Prost retired, he realised how much of his motivation had come from fighting with Prost.

== Later life ==
During 1994 and 1995, Prost worked as a pundit for the French TV channel TF1. He also worked for Renault doing public relations and promotions. Prost went back to his old team McLaren, working as a technical adviser; he also completed L'Étape du Tour, an annual mass-participation bike ride that takes place on a stage of the Tour de France.

In 2024, Prost publicly expressed concerns about the growing trend of Formula One teams undergoing frequent name changes due to shifts in ownership and sponsorship. He argued that while commercial partnerships are an integral part of modern Formula One, the constant rebranding risks undermining the sport’s sense of tradition and continuity. Citing the example of Sauber, which transitioned from Alfa Romeo to Stake and then to Audi in 2026, as well as the rebranding of AlphaTauri into Visa Cash App RB, Prost suggested that such practices dilute the historic identity and emotional connection fans have with longstanding teams. He emphasized that Formula One’s heritage is built not only on its drivers and manufacturers but also on the enduring legacies of its teams, and warned that prioritizing short-term commercial gains over stability could damage the sport’s cultural fabric.

=== Prost Grand Prix ===
During 1989, Prost began to contemplate starting his own team, as his relationship with his McLaren teammate, Ayrton Senna, had turned sour. Prost and John Barnard, formerly chief designer at McLaren, came close to founding a team in 1990; but a lack of sponsorship meant that this was not possible, so Prost moved to Ferrari and Barnard left Ferrari to join Benetton. After falling out with the Italian team at the end of 1991, Prost found himself without a drive for 1992; after the failure of extensive negotiations with Guy Ligier about buying his Ligier team, Prost decided to join Williams for 1993. By 1995, when Prost was working for Renault, people had assumed that a Prost-Renault team would be formed. Renault refused Prost's request to supply engines for his team, ending the speculation.

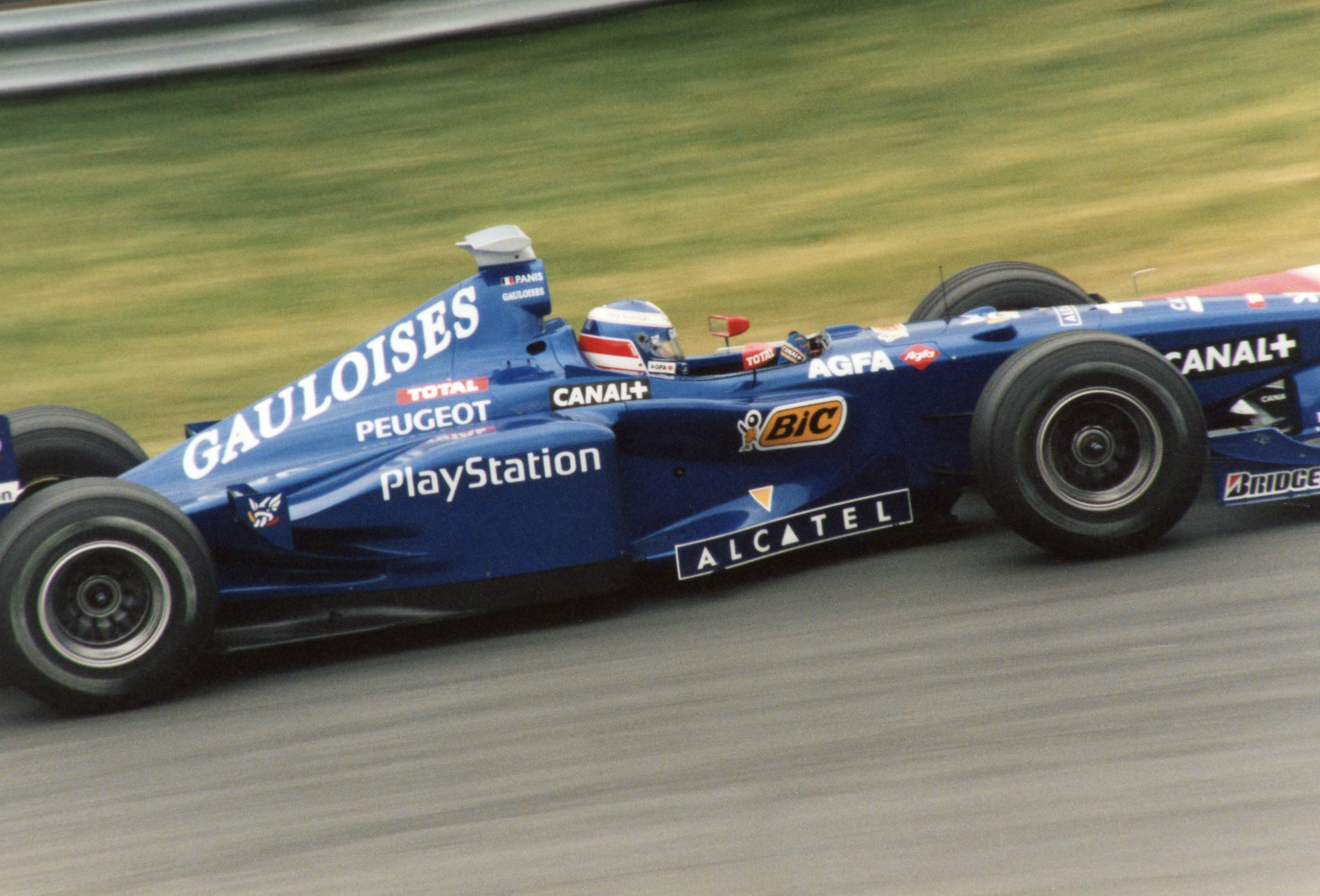
Olivier Panis driving for the Prost Grand Prix team at the 1998 Canadian Grand Prix

On 13 February 1997, Prost bought the Ligier team from Flavio Briatore and renamed it "Prost Grand Prix". The day after he bought the team, Prost signed a three-year deal with French car manufacturer Peugeot, who would supply the team with engines from 1998 until 2000. For the team's first season, Prost kept one of Ligier's 1996 drivers, Olivier Panis, who had won the Monaco Grand Prix the previous year; Japanese driver Shinji Nakano was signed to partner Panis. The team raced with the Mugen-Honda engines used by Ligier the previous season, while the car was actually the originally intended Ligier JS45, but was renamed the Prost JS45. Things looked promising at the start of the season, as the team picked up two points on its Grand Prix debut in Australia when Olivier Panis finished fifth. The team scored a further 13 points before Panis broke his leg in an accident during the Canadian Grand Prix. He was replaced by Minardi's Jarno Trulli. From there, things started to go downhill slightly, the team scored only five points during Panis's recovery. He came back at the end of the season to race in the last three Grands Prix. Prost GP finished sixth in the Constructors' Championship in its first season, with 21 points.

Prost became the president of Prost Grand Prix at the start of 1998. With Peugeot supplying the engines for Prost GP, Mugen-Honda decided to supply the Jordan team. Prost GP scored a single point during the season when Jarno Trulli finished sixth in Belgium.

1999 was a crucial year for Prost GP. Prost hired John Barnard as a technical consultant, Barnard's B3 Technologies company helping Loïc Bigois with the design of the Prost AP02. Panis and Trulli agreed to stay on with the team for the season. The car was not a major concern but the Peugeot V10 engine proved to be heavy and unreliable.

Peugeot's final year as Prost's engine supplier in 2000 saw some optimism. Prost hired his 1991 Ferrari teammate Jean Alesi to drive the lead car and German Nick Heidfeld, who had won the 1999 Formula 3000 championship, to partner him. The season proved to be yet another disastrous one: the AP03 proved to be unreliable and ill handling. Things were not helped when the drivers collided with each other in the Austrian Grand Prix. Newly hired technical director Alan Jenkins was fired midway through the year. Prost restructured the team, hiring Joan Villadelprat as the managing director and replacing Jenkins with Henri Durand as the team's new technical director.

In 2001, Ferrari agreed to supply engines for the season. The money ran out at the start of the 2002 season and Prost was out of business, leaving debts of around $30 million.

=== Other roles ===
During 2002, Prost spent time with his family and competed in eight bicycle races, finishing third in the Granite – Mont Lozère. The Frenchman raced in the Andros ice race series in 2003, finishing second in the championship behind Yvan Muller. In 2003 and 2004, Prost took part in the Étape du Tour. Prost also became an Ambassador for Uniroyal, a position he would keep until May 2006. Prost continued to compete in the Andros Trophy, winning the title with Toyota in 2006/07, 2007/08 and with Dacia in 2011/2012.

For the 2010 Formula One season, the Sporting Regulations were changed so that a former driver sits on the stewards' panel. Prost was the first such driver to take on this role, at the 2010 Bahrain Grand Prix. Prost also took part in the Race of Champions in 2010, a race organised for legends of motor sport to compete in equal machinery. In February 2012, Prost was named as Renault's new international ambassador, representing the company in sports demonstrations and at events organized or attended by Renault. Prost has finished the Absa Cape Epic, an eight-day 700 km mountain bike race in South Africa, twice. He first completed the race in 2012 with partner Sebastien di Pasqua and then again in 2013, and started but did not finish the race in 2014.

In October 2013, it was announced that Prost would join forces with Jean-Paul Driot's DAMS racing team to form e.dams, a team which would compete in the FIA Formula E Championship for electric racing cars from its commencement in September 2014. In June 2014, the team announced that its initial driver line-up would consist of Nicolas Prost and Sébastien Buemi. The team went on to win the inaugural Formula E teams championship. Prost was a pundit with Channel 4 F1 for the 2016 season.

In 2017, Prost was employed as a special adviser for the Renault Formula One Team. Since July 2019, he took up a non-executive director role with Renault Sport. During the 1000th Formula One race, the 2019 Chinese Grand Prix, Prost had the honour of waving the chequered flag as Mercedes driver Lewis Hamilton crossed the line to take his 75th career victory. Prost continued in his role within Renault Formula One Team, renamed "Alpine F1 Team" in 2021, until January 2022, when his departure from the team was announced.

== Personal life ==
Prost was married to Anne-Marie (born 14 February 1955), but they divorced sometime later. They have two sons, Nicolas (born 18 August 1981) and Sacha Prost (born 30 May 1990). Prost also has a daughter, Victoria, born in 1996 from his relationship with Bernadette Cottin. From 2014 to 2018, Nicolas raced in Formula E for e.dams Renault, a team partially run by his father. Prost lived in his hometown, Saint-Chamond, until he and his Renault team fell out in the early 1980s. In April 1983 the Prost family moved to Sainte-Croix, Switzerland, and shortly after to Yens, Switzerland. They moved to Switzerland after Renault workers went to Prost's house in France and burned his Mercedes-Benz and another one of his road cars. They lived there until November 1999, when they moved to Nyon in the same country. Through Nicolas, Prost has two grandsons named Kimi (born November 2015) and Mika (born December 2020). Through Sacha, he has another grandson named Liam (born June 2018).

In 1986, Prost was awarded the Légion d'honneur by the French President, François Mitterrand; he was promoted from Chevalier to Officier rank in 1993. In addition, he was awarded an honorary British OBE in 1994, and the Brazilian Order of the Southern Cross in 1999. He was also inducted into the International Motorsports Hall of Fame and the FIA Hall of Fame in 1999 and 2017 respectively.

Besides his native French language, Prost also speaks fluent English and Italian.

== In popular culture ==
Prost voiced an animated depiction of himself in McLaren's Tooned cartoon series to commemorate McLaren's 50th anniversary. Episode 5 of the series' second season tells a fictionalized account of the 1984 Formula One season which attributes Prost's mechanical failures and final championship standing in the season to the actions of the character Professor M (voiced by Alexander Armstrong).

== Karting record ==
=== Karting career summary ===
Season	Series	Team	Position
1973	French Championship — Junior		1st
1973	French Championship — Senior		2nd
1973	European Championship — Junior		1st
1973	FIA Karting World Championship — Junior		1st
1973	FIA Karting World Championship — Senior		14th
1974	French Championship — Senior		1st
1974	FIA Karting World Championship — Senior		23rd

== Racing record ==
=== Career summary ===
Season	Series	Team	Races	Wins	Poles	F/Laps	Podiums	Points	Position
1976	Formule Renault Nationale	Ecurie Elf	13	12	10	11	12	112	**1st**
1976	Challenge de Formule Renault Europe	Equipe Danielson	2	0	1	0	0	1	28th
1977	Challenge de Formule Renault Europe		16	6	4	7	10	157	**1st**
1977	European Formula Two	Willi Kauhsen Racing Team	2	0	0	0	0	0	NC
1978	French Formula Three	Ecurie Elf	?	?	?	?	?	?	**1st**
1978	European Formula Three	Ecurie Elf	8	1	1	1	1	10	9th
1978	Super Visco British Formula Three	Ecurie Elf	2	0	0	0	1	7	13th
1978	Vandervell British Formula Three	Ecurie Elf	1	0	0	0	1	18	9th
1978	European Formula Two	Fred Opert Racing	1	0	0	0	0	0	NC
1979	French Formula Three	Ecurie Elf	5	5	4	5	5	75	**1st**
1979	FIA European Formula 3 Championship	Ecurie Elf	10	6	5	6	8	67	**1st**
1979	British Formula Three	Ecurie Elf	1	0	0	0	0	4	12th
1980	Formula One	Marlboro Team McLaren	13	0	0	0	0	5	16th
1980	BMW M1 Procar Championship	BMW Motorsport	1	0	0	0	0	6	21st
1981	Formula One	Équipe Renault Elf	15	3	2	1	6	43	5th
1982	Formula One	Équipe Renault Elf	16	2	5	4	4	34	4th
1983	Formula One	Équipe Renault Elf	15	4	3	3	7	57	**2nd**
1984	Formula One	Marlboro McLaren TAG Turbo	16	7	3	3	9	71.5	**2nd**
1985	Formula One	Marlboro McLaren TAG Turbo	16	5	2	5	11	73	**1st**
1986	Formula One	Marlboro McLaren TAG Turbo	16	4	1	2	11	72	**1st**
1987	Formula One	Marlboro McLaren TAG Turbo	16	3	0	2	7	46	4th
1988	Formula One	Honda Marlboro McLaren	16	7	2	7	14	87	**2nd**
1989	Formula One	Honda Marlboro McLaren	16	4	2	5	11	76	**1st**
1990	Formula One	Scuderia Ferrari	16	5	0	2	9	71	**2nd**
1991	Formula One	Scuderia Ferrari	15	0	0	1	5	34	5th
1993	Formula One	Canon Williams Renault	16	7	13	6	12	99	**1st**
2005	FFSA GT Championship	Exagon Engineering	11	1	2	0	3	104	11th

=== Complete European Formula Three results ===
(key) (Races in bold indicate pole position) (Races in italics indicate fastest lap)

Year	Entrant	Chassis	Engine	1	2	3	4	5	6	7	8	9	10	11	12	13	14	15	16	DC	Pts
1978	Ecurie Elf	Martini Mk 21B	Renault	ZAN	NÜR	ÖST	ZOL; 10	IMO	NÜR; DNS	DIJ; 10	MNZ; 15	PER	MAG; Ret	KNU	KAR	DON; 6	KAS	**JAR**; 1	VAL; Ret	9th	10
1979	Ecurie Elf	Martini Mk 27	Renault	VAL; 2	ÖST; 1	**ZOL**; 1	MAG; 1	DON; 3	ZAN; 1	PER	MNZ; DNQ	**KNU**; 1	**KIN**; Ret	**JAR**; 1	KAS					**1st**	**67**

=== Complete Formula One World Championship results ===
(key) (Races in bold indicate pole position, races in italics indicate fastest lap)

Year	Entrant	Chassis	Engine	1	2	3	4	5	6	7	8	9	10	11	12	13	14	15	16	WDC	Points
1980	Marlboro Team McLaren	McLaren M29B	Ford-Cosworth DFV 3.0 V8	ARG; 6	BRA; 5	RSA; DNS	USW													16th	5
1980	Marlboro Team McLaren	McLaren M29C	Ford-Cosworth DFV 3.0 V8					BEL; Ret	MON; Ret	FRA; Ret	GBR; 6	GER; 11	AUT; 7							16th	5
1980	Marlboro Team McLaren	McLaren M30	Ford-Cosworth DFV 3.0 V8											NED; 6	ITA; 7	CAN; Ret	USA; DNS			16th	5
1981	Équipe Renault Elf	Renault RE20B	Renault-Gordini EF1 1.5 V6 t	USW; Ret	BRA; Ret	ARG; 3	SMR; Ret	BEL; Ret												5th	43
1981	Équipe Renault Elf	Renault RE30	Renault-Gordini EF1 1.5 V6 t						MON; Ret	ESP; Ret	FRA; 1	GBR; Ret	**GER**; 2	AUT; Ret	**NED**; 1	ITA; 1	CAN; Ret	CPL; 2		5th	43
1982	Équipe Renault Elf	Renault RE30B	Renault-Gordini EF1 1.5 V6 t	RSA; 1	**BRA**; 1	USW; Ret	SMR; Ret	**BEL**; Ret	MON; 7^{†}	**DET**; NC	CAN; Ret	NED; Ret	GBR; 6	FRA; 2	GER; Ret	AUT; 8^{†}	**SUI**; 2	ITA; Ret	**CPL**; 4	4th	34
1983	Équipe Renault Elf	Renault RE30C	Renault-Gordini EF1 1.5 V6 t	BRA; 7																**2nd**	**57**
1983	Équipe Renault Elf	Renault RE40	Renault-Gordini EF1 1.5 V6 t		USW; 11	**FRA**; 1	SMR; 2	**MON**; 3	**BEL**; 1	DET; 8	CAN; 5	GBR; 1	GER; 4	AUT; 1	NED; Ret	ITA; Ret	EUR; 2	RSA; Ret		**2nd**	**57**
1984	Marlboro McLaren International	McLaren MP4/2	TAG TTE PO1 1.5 V6 t	BRA; 1	RSA; 2	BEL; Ret	SMR; 1	FRA; 7	**MON**; 1^{‡}	CAN; 3	DET; 4	DAL; Ret	GBR; Ret	**GER**; 1	AUT; Ret	**NED**; 1	ITA; Ret	EUR; 1	POR; 1	**2nd**	**71.5**
1985	Marlboro McLaren International	McLaren MP4/2B	TAG TTE PO1 1.5 V6 t	BRA; 1	POR; Ret	SMR; DSQ	MON; 1	CAN; 3	DET; Ret	FRA; 3	GBR; 1	GER; 2	**AUT**; 1	NED; 2	ITA; 1	**BEL**; 3	EUR; 4	RSA; 3	AUS; Ret	**1st**	**73 (76)**
1986	Marlboro McLaren International	McLaren MP4/2C	TAG TTE PO1 1.5 V6 t	BRA; Ret	ESP; 3	SMR; 1	**MON**; 1	BEL; 6	CAN; 2	DET; 3	FRA; 2	GBR; 3	GER; 6^{†}	HUN; Ret	AUT; 1	ITA; DSQ	POR; 2	MEX; 2	AUS; 1	**1st**	**72 (74)**
1987	Marlboro McLaren International	McLaren MP4/3	TAG TTE PO1 1.5 V6 t	BRA; 1	SMR; Ret	BEL; 1	MON; 9^{†}	DET; 3	FRA; 3	GBR; Ret	GER; 7^{†}	HUN; 3	AUT; 6	ITA; 15	POR; 1	ESP; 2	MEX; Ret	JPN; 7	AUS; Ret	4th	46
1988	Honda Marlboro McLaren	McLaren MP4/4	Honda RA168E 1.5 V6 t	BRA; 1	SMR; 2	MON; 1	MEX; 1	CAN; 2	DET; 2	**FRA**; 1	GBR; Ret	GER; 2	HUN; 2	BEL; 2	ITA; Ret	**POR**; 1	ESP; 1	JPN; 2	AUS; 1	**2nd**	**87 (105)**
1989	Honda Marlboro McLaren	McLaren MP4/5	Honda RA109E 3.5 V10	BRA; 2	SMR; 2	MON; 2	MEX; 5	USA; 1	**CAN**; Ret	**FRA**; 1	GBR; 1	GER; 2	HUN; 4	BEL; 2	ITA; 1	POR; 2	ESP; 3	JPN; Ret	AUS; Ret	**1st**	**76 (81)**
1990	Scuderia Ferrari	Ferrari 641	Ferrari 036 3.5 V12 Ferrari 037 3.5 V12	USA; Ret	BRA; 1	SMR; 4	MON; Ret													**2nd**	**71 (73)**
1990	Scuderia Ferrari	Ferrari 641/2	Ferrari 036 3.5 V12 Ferrari 037 3.5 V12					CAN; 5	MEX; 1	FRA; 1	GBR; 1	GER; 4	HUN; Ret	BEL; 2	ITA; 2	POR; 3	ESP; 1	JPN; Ret	AUS; 3	**2nd**	**71 (73)**
1991	Scuderia Ferrari	Ferrari 642	Ferrari 037 3.5 V12	USA; 2	BRA; 4	SMR; DNS	MON; 5	CAN; Ret	MEX; Ret											5th	34
1991	Scuderia Ferrari	Ferrari 643	Ferrari 037 3.5 V12							FRA; 2	GBR; 3	GER; Ret	HUN; Ret	BEL; Ret	ITA; 3	POR; Ret	ESP; 2	JPN; 4	AUS	5th	34
1993	Canon Williams Renault	Williams FW15C	Renault RS5 3.5 V10	**RSA**; 1	**BRA**; Ret	**EUR**; 3	**SMR**; 1	**ESP**; 1	**MON**; 4	**CAN**; 1	FRA; 1	**GBR**; 1	**GER**; 1	**HUN**; 12	**BEL**; 3	**ITA**; 12^{†}	POR; 2	**JPN**; 2	AUS; 2	**1st**	**99**

^{†} Did not finish, but was classified as he had completed more than 90% of the race distance.
^{‡} Race was stopped with less than 75% of laps completed, half points awarded.

=== Formula One non-championship results ===
(key) (Races in bold indicate pole position) (Races in italics indicate fastest lap)

Year	Entrant	Chassis	Engine	1
1980	Marlboro Team McLaren	McLaren M29	Ford Cosworth DFV	ESP; Ret

== See also ==
- Formula One drivers from France

== Bibliography ==
- Roebuck, Nigel (1986). Grand Prix Greats. Book Club Associates. ISBN 0-85059-792-7.

Sporting positions
Preceded by Michel Leclère	Championnat de Formule Renault; Nationale Champion; 1976	Succeeded by Joël Gouhier
Preceded by Elio de Angelis	Monaco Formula Three; Race Winner; 1979	Succeeded by Mauro Baldi
Preceded by Patrick Depailler (1973)	French Formula Three; Champion; 1979	Succeeded by Alain Ferté
Preceded by Jan Lammers	European Formula Three; Champion; 1979	Succeeded by Michele Alboreto
Preceded by Niki Lauda	Formula One World Champion; 1985–1986	Succeeded by Nelson Piquet
Preceded by Ayrton Senna	Formula One World Champion; 1989	Succeeded by Ayrton Senna
Preceded by Nigel Mansell	Formula One World Champion; 1993	Succeeded by Michael Schumacher
Records
Preceded by Jackie Stewart; 27 wins (1965–1973)	Most Grand Prix wins 51 wins, 28th at the 1987 Portuguese GP	Succeeded by Michael Schumacher; 91 wins, 52nd at the 2001 Belgian GP
Awards and achievements
Preceded by Niki Lauda	Autosport; International Racing Driver Award; 1985	Succeeded by Nigel Mansell
Preceded by Murray Walker; Colin McRae	Autosport; Gregor Grant Award; 1994	Succeeded by Leo Mehl; Emerson Fittipaldi
