= Ferrari 642 =

1991 Formula One racing car by Ferrari

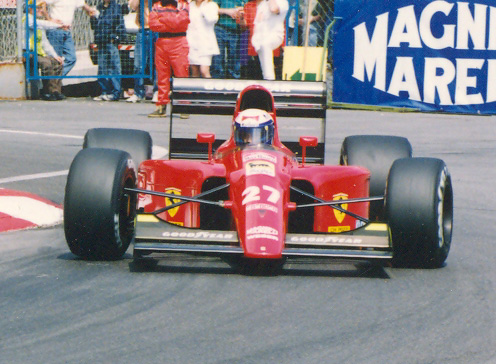
- Alain Prost driving the 642 at the 1991 Monaco Grand Prix
- Category: Formula One
- Constructor: Ferrari
- Designers: Steve Nichols (Technical Director); Pierguido Castelli (Technical Coordination Director); Jean-Claude Migeot (Chief Designer); Gianfranco Ciampolini (Head of Electronics); Paolo Massai (Engine Department Director)
- Predecessor: 641
- Successor: 643

Technical specifications
- Chassis: Carbon fibre composite monocoque
- Suspension (front): Double wishbones, push-rod actuated torsion bar springs and telescopic shock absorbers, anti-roll bar
- Suspension (rear): Double wishbones, push-rod actuated coil springs over telescopic shock absorbers, anti-roll bar
- Axle track: Front: 1,800 mm (71 in); Rear: 1,675 mm (65.9 in)
- Wheelbase: 2,830 mm (111 in)
- Engine: Ferrari Tipo 037, 3,499 cc (213.5 cu in), 65° V12, NA, mid-engine, longitudinally-mounted
- Transmission: Ferrari 7-speed semi-automatic
- Power: 710-725 hp @ 13,800-14,500 rpm
- Weight: 505 kg (1,113 lb)
- Fuel: Agip
- Tyres: Goodyear

Competition history
- Notable entrants: Scuderia Ferrari SpA
- Notable drivers: 27. (France) Alain Prost; 28. (France) Jean Alesi
- Debut: 1991 United States Grand Prix
- Last event: 1991 Mexican Grand Prix
Races	Wins	Podiums	Poles	F/Laps
6	0	2	0	2

The Ferrari 642 (also known as the Ferrari F1-91) was a Formula One racing car designed by Steve Nichols and Jean-Claude Migeot and was used by Scuderia Ferrari in the 1991 Formula One season. It was a development of the team's 641 chassis, which had mounted a championship challenge in 1990.

Ferrari started the 1991 season with high hopes of winning the championship. Jean Alesi signed a contract with the Scuderia when Nigel Mansell returned to the Williams team. The 642's best result was a second place taken by Alain Prost at the 1991 United States Grand Prix, held at the Phoenix street circuit.

The 642 was replaced by the Ferrari 643 at the 1991 French Grand Prix.

== Complete results ==
(key) (results in italics indicate fastest lap)

Year	Team	Engine	Tyres	Drivers	1	2	3	4	5	6	7	8	9	10	11	12	13	14	15	16	Pts.	WCC
1991	Scuderia Ferrari SpA	Ferrari Tipo 291; V12	G		USA	BRA	SMR	MON	CAN	MEX	FRA	GBR	GER	HUN	BEL	ITA	POR	ESP	JPN	AUS	55.5*	3rd
1991	Scuderia Ferrari SpA	Ferrari Tipo 291; V12	G	Alain Prost	2	4	DNS	5	Ret	Ret											55.5*	3rd
1991	Scuderia Ferrari SpA	Ferrari Tipo 291; V12	G	Jean Alesi	12	6	Ret	3	Ret	Ret											55.5*	3rd

* 39.5 points scored using Ferrari 643
