= Ferrari 643 =

1991 Formula One racing car by Ferrari

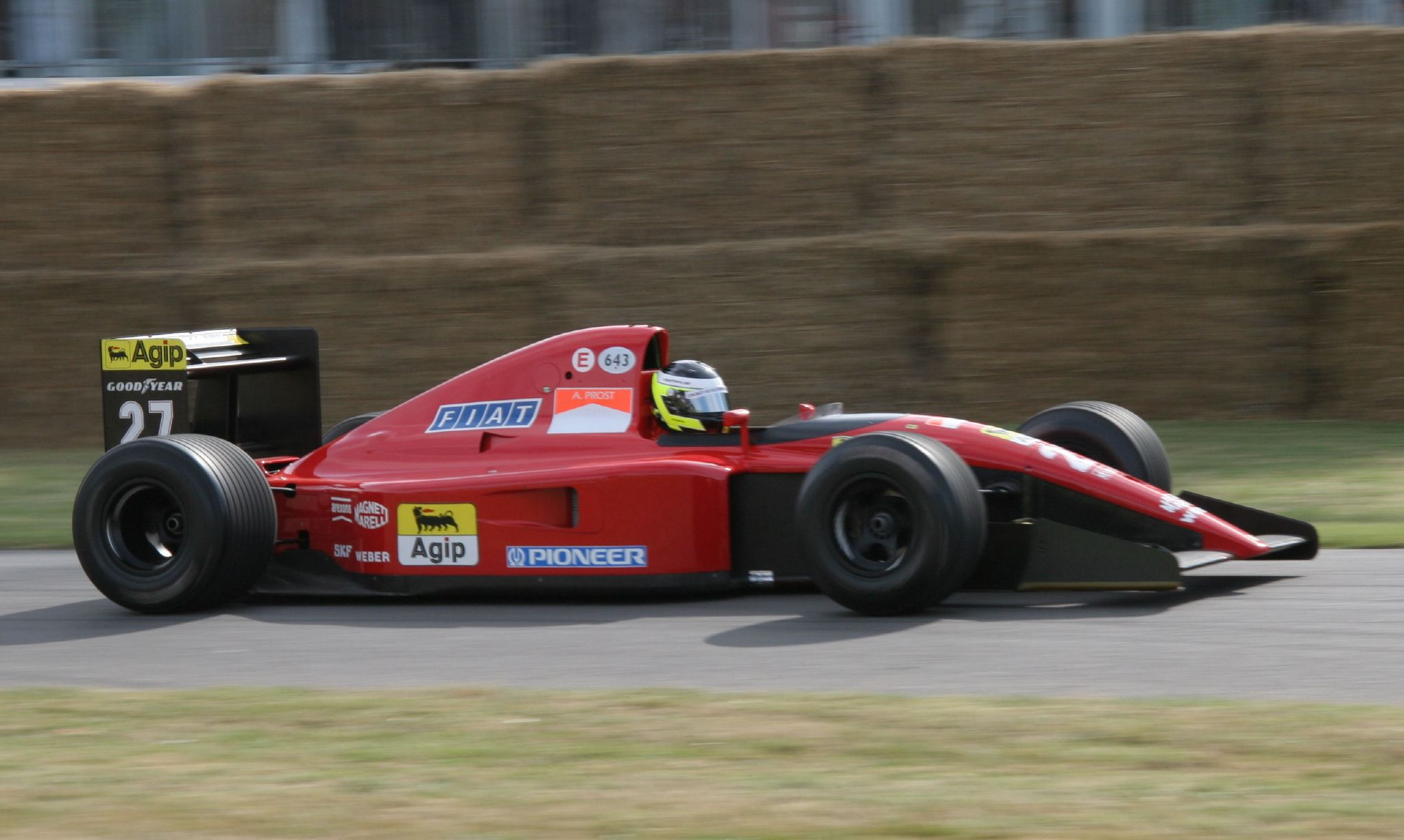
- The 643 at the 2006 Goodwood Festival of Speed
- Category: Formula One
- Constructor: Ferrari
- Designers: Steve Nichols (Technical Director); Jean-Claude Migeot (Chief Designer); Gianfranco Ciampolini (Head of Electronics); Paolo Massai (Engine Department Director)
- Predecessor: 642
- Successor: F92A

Technical specifications
- Chassis: Carbon fibre composite monocoque
- Suspension (front): Double wishbones, push-rod actuated torsion bar springs, and telescopic shock absorbers, anti-roll bar
- Suspension (rear): Double wishbones, push-rod actuated coil springs over telescopic shock absorbers, anti-roll bar
- Engine: Ferrari Tipo 291, 3,499 cc (213.5 cu in), 65° V12, NA, mid-engine, longitudinally-mounted
- Transmission: Ferrari Type 643 7-speed semi-automatic
- Power: 710 hp @ 13,800 rpm
- Fuel: Agip
- Tyres: Goodyear

Competition history
- Notable entrants: Scuderia Ferrari SpA
- Notable drivers: 27. (France) Alain Prost; 28. (France) Jean Alesi; 27. (Italy) Gianni Morbidelli
- Debut: 1991 French Grand Prix
- Last event: 1991 Australian Grand Prix
Races	Wins	Podiums	Poles	F/Laps
10	0	6	0	0

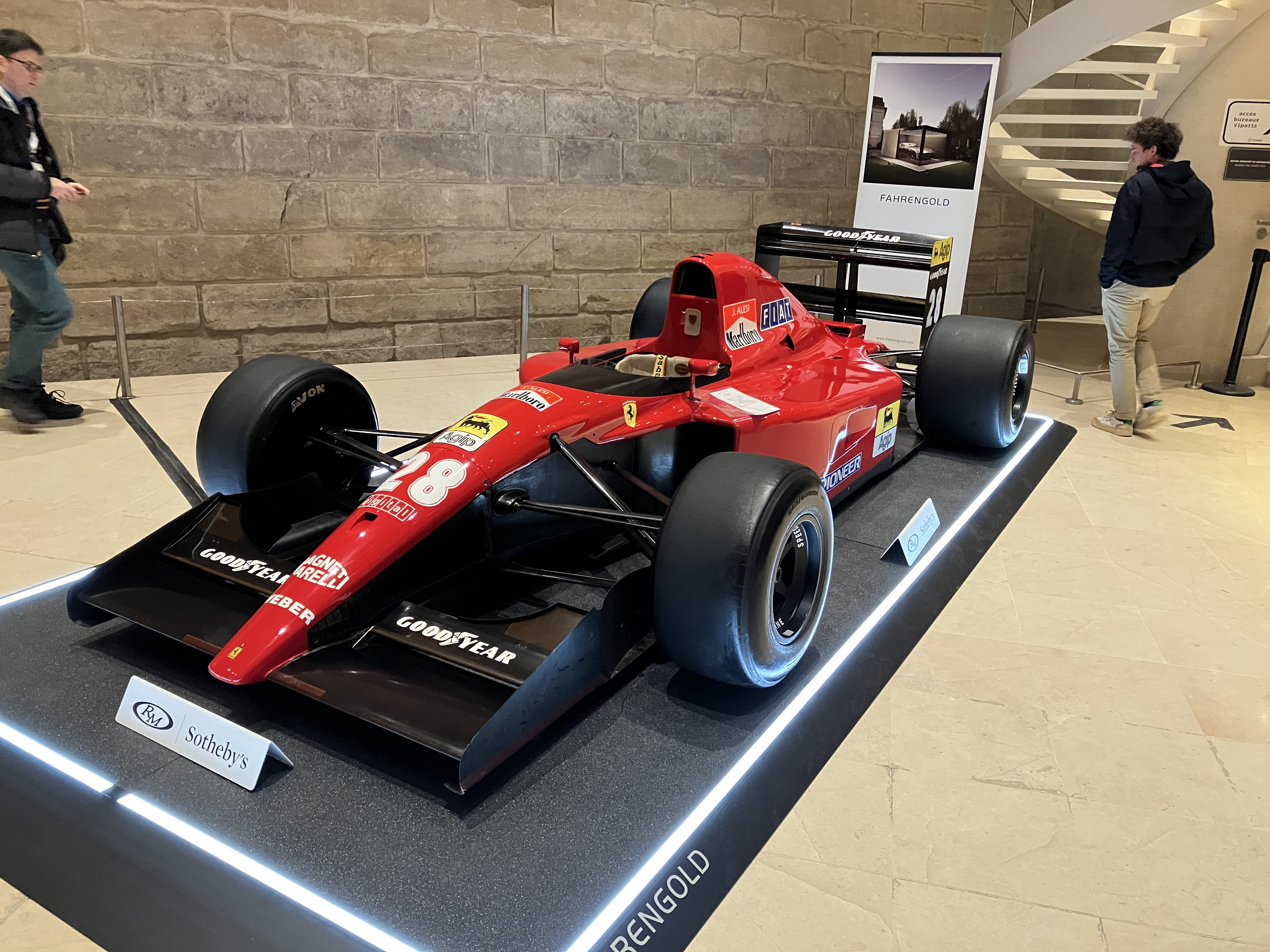
Chassis #127 of Jean Alesi

The Ferrari 643 was a Formula One car designed by Steve Nichols and Jean-Claude Migeot and was built by Scuderia Ferrari for use in the 1991 Formula One season. Introduced at the French Grand Prix after being developed in May, the car initially demonstrated strong potential to compete at the front of the grid. Alain Prost qualified on the front row and briefly led the race before being overtaken by Nigel Mansell in the Renault-powered Williams FW14. Nevertheless, a second-place finish in its debut outing was regarded as an encouraging start. Ultimately, the car would help the team finish third in the 1991 Constructors' Championship.

== Design ==
The chassis of the 643 was a total redesign over the 642 which suffered inconsistent handling issues and was designed to allow for softer suspension travel, as per Prost's request. The V12 engine was upgraded six major times during 1991, with the final evolution used from Portugal to the end of the season. The chassis itself had two revisions, the first after the French Grand Prix—which saw a relocation of the exhaust exits from underneath the car, and Belgium which saw minor alterations to the body cover.

== Season overview ==
The car was not as competitive a car like the Williams FW14 and McLaren MP4/6 cars; a big problem with the car lay with a lack of correct data gathering due to the team's turbulent management structure at the time. The car's results (or lack thereof) was one of the main reasons for the falling out between Prost and Ferrari, with the Frenchman eventually saying that "a truck would be easier to drive than this car". Following the Japanese Grand Prix, Prost was fired for the second time in his F1 career by a works team (he had also been fired by the Renault team just 2 days after the conclusion to the 1983 season for his public criticism of the team's failure to adequately develop the Renault RE40 which had cost both himself and the team the respective Drivers' and Constructors' Championships). The team replaced him in Australia with test driver Gianni Morbidelli.

The car scored 39.5 points of the team's 55.5 points in 1991 (the 642 model was used to score 16 points in the first 6 races of the season) with 8 podiums and finished third in the Constructors' Championship.

== Later use ==
The 643 was tested in early 1992 by Ivan Capelli before being replaced at the start of the 1992 season by the Ferrari F92A.

== Performance ==
in the 1/1992 Sport Auto they found the Ferrari 643 had a performance of:

0 - 100 kph	2.4 s
0 - 200 kph	4.9 s
Top speed	332 kph (206 mph)

== Complete results ==
(key)

Year	Team	Engine	Tyres	Drivers	1	2	3	4	5	6	7	8	9	10	11	12	13	14	15	16	Pts.	WCC
1991	Scuderia Ferrari SpA	Ferrari Tipo 291; V12	G		USA	BRA	SMR	MON	CAN	MEX	FRA	GBR	GER	HUN	BEL	ITA	POR	ESP	JPN	AUS	55.5*	3rd
1991	Scuderia Ferrari SpA	Ferrari Tipo 291; V12	G	Alain Prost							2	3	Ret	Ret	Ret	3	Ret	2	4		55.5*	3rd
1991	Scuderia Ferrari SpA	Ferrari Tipo 291; V12	G	Jean Alesi							4	Ret	3	5	Ret	Ret	3	4	Ret	Ret	55.5*	3rd
1991	Scuderia Ferrari SpA	Ferrari Tipo 291; V12	G	Gianni Morbidelli																6	55.5*	3rd

* 16 points scored using Ferrari 642
