= 1991 French Grand Prix =

- Race 7 of 16 in the 1991 Formula One World Championship

Race details
- Date: 7 July 1991
- Location: Circuit de Nevers Magny-Cours; Magny-Cours, France
- Course: Permanent circuit
- Course length: 4.250 km (2.651 miles)
- Distance: 72 laps, 306.000 km (190.892 miles)

Pole position
| Driver | (Italy) Riccardo Patrese | Williams-Renault |
- Time: 1:14.559

Fastest lap
| Driver | (United Kingdom) Nigel Mansell | Williams-Renault |
- Time: 1:19.168 on lap 49

Podium
| First | (United Kingdom) Nigel Mansell | Williams-Renault |
| Second | (France) Alain Prost | Ferrari |
| Third | (Brazil) Ayrton Senna | McLaren-Honda |

The 1991 French Grand Prix was a Formula One motor race held at Magny-Cours on 7 July 1991. It was the seventh race of the 1991 Formula One World Championship, and the first French Grand Prix to be held at Magny-Cours. The 72-lap race was won by Nigel Mansell, driving a Williams-Renault, with local driver Alain Prost second in a Ferrari and Ayrton Senna third in a McLaren-Honda.

== Pre-race ==
The French Grand Prix had moved from the Circuit Paul Ricard near Marseille to the Circuit de Nevers Magny-Cours in the centre of France, to mixed reviews. There were no changes in the driver line-up, but the Footwork team had decided to abandon the disastrous Porsche V12 engine project in favour of a return to Ford engines, while Ferrari introduced a new car, the 643.

== Qualifying ==
=== Pre-qualifying report ===
In the Friday morning pre-qualification session, Andrea de Cesaris was fastest in the Jordan for the second time this season. He was four tenths of a second faster than JJ Lehto in the Dallara, with Olivier Grouillard third fastest for Fondmetal at his home race, the second time in a row the Frenchman had pre-qualified. The fourth pre-qualifier was Bertrand Gachot in the other Jordan.

Those failing to progress to the main qualifying sessions included the other Dallara of Emanuele Pirro in fifth, just a couple of tenths slower than Gachot. The two Modena Lambos were sixth and seventh, with Nicola Larini outpacing Eric van de Poele, and bottom of the time sheets was Pedro Chaves in the Coloni. This was the seventh consecutive Grand Prix in which the Portuguese driver had failed to pre-qualify.

=== Pre-qualifying classification ===
| Pos | No | Driver | Constructor | Time | Gap |
|---|---|---|---|---|---|
| 1 | 33 | (Italy) Andrea de Cesaris | Jordan-Ford | 1:19.729 | — |
| 2 | 22 | (Finland) JJ Lehto | Dallara-Judd | 1:20.172 | +0.443 |
| 3 | 14 | (France) Olivier Grouillard | Fondmetal-Ford | 1:20.227 | +0.498 |
| 4 | 32 | (Belgium) Bertrand Gachot | Jordan-Ford | 1:20.309 | +0.580 |
| 5 | 21 | (Italy) Emanuele Pirro | Dallara-Judd | 1:20.539 | +0.810 |
| 6 | 34 | (Italy) Nicola Larini | Lambo-Lamborghini | 1:20.628 | +0.899 |
| 7 | 35 | (Belgium) Eric van de Poele | Lambo-Lamborghini | 1:21.304 | +1.575 |
| 8 | 31 | (Portugal) Pedro Chaves | Coloni-Ford | 1:22.229 | +2.500 |

=== Qualifying report ===
In qualifying, local driver Alain Prost impressed and was set to score Ferrari's first pole position of the season, but in the dying minutes Riccardo Patrese in the Williams-Renault came through to pip the French driver to the pole. Championship leader Ayrton Senna spun on Olivier Grouillard's oil on his final qualifying attempt and had to settle for third alongside Nigel Mansell in the second Williams, with the rest of the top ten starting spots occupied by Gerhard Berger, Jean Alesi, Nelson Piquet, Roberto Moreno, Maurício Gugelmin, and the impressive Gianni Morbidelli in a Minardi.

=== Qualifying classification ===
| Pos | No | Driver | Constructor | Q1 | Q2 | Gap |
|---|---|---|---|---|---|---|
| 1 | 6 | (Italy) Riccardo Patrese | Williams-Renault | 1:17.472 | 1:14.559 | - |
| 2 | 27 | (France) Alain Prost | Ferrari | 1:17.386 | 1:14.789 | +0.230 |
| 3 | 1 | (Brazil) Ayrton Senna | McLaren-Honda | 1:16.557 | 1:14.857 | +0.298 |
| 4 | 5 | (United Kingdom) Nigel Mansell | Williams-Renault | 1:17.095 | 1:14.895 | +0.336 |
| 5 | 2 | (Austria) Gerhard Berger | McLaren-Honda | 1:18.087 | 1:15.376 | +0.817 |
| 6 | 28 | (France) Jean Alesi | Ferrari | 1:17.303 | 1:15.877 | +1.318 |
| 7 | 20 | (Brazil) Nelson Piquet | Benetton-Ford | 1:20.449 | 1:16.816 | +2.257 |
| 8 | 19 | (Brazil) Roberto Moreno | Benetton-Ford | 1:19.711 | 1:16.961 | +2.402 |
| 9 | 15 | (Brazil) Maurício Gugelmin | Leyton House-Ilmor | 1:19.728 | 1:17.015 | +2.456 |
| 10 | 24 | (Italy) Gianni Morbidelli | Minardi-Ferrari | 1:20.635 | 1:17.020 | +2.461 |
| 11 | 4 | (Italy) Stefano Modena | Tyrrell-Honda | 1:19.530 | 1:17.114 | +2.555 |
| 12 | 23 | (Italy) Pierluigi Martini | Minardi-Ferrari | 1:19.426 | 1:17.149 | +2.590 |
| 13 | 33 | (Italy) Andrea de Cesaris | Jordan-Ford | 1:20.097 | 1:17.163 | +2.604 |
| 14 | 26 | (France) Érik Comas | Ligier-Lamborghini | 1:20.427 | 1:17.504 | +2.945 |
| 15 | 16 | (Italy) Ivan Capelli | Leyton House-Ilmor | 1:19.555 | 1:17.533 | +2.974 |
| 16 | 25 | (Belgium) Thierry Boutsen | Ligier-Lamborghini | 1:19.187 | 1:17.775 | +3.216 |
| 17 | 8 | (United Kingdom) Mark Blundell | Brabham-Yamaha | 1:22.277 | 1:17.836 | +3.277 |
| 18 | 3 | (Japan) Satoru Nakajima | Tyrrell-Honda | 1:21.020 | 1:18.144 | +3.585 |
| 19 | 32 | (Belgium) Bertrand Gachot | Jordan-Ford | 1:20.374 | 1:18.150 | +3.591 |
| 20 | 12 | (United Kingdom) Johnny Herbert | Lotus-Judd | 1:21.230 | 1:18.185 | +3.626 |
| 21 | 14 | (France) Olivier Grouillard | Fondmetal-Ford | 1:20.640 | 1:18.210 | +3.651 |
| 22 | 30 | (Japan) Aguri Suzuki | Lola-Ford | 1:22.058 | 1:18.224 | +3.665 |
| 23 | 29 | (France) Éric Bernard | Lola-Ford | 1:21.613 | 1:18.540 | +3.981 |
| 24 | 7 | (United Kingdom) Martin Brundle | Brabham-Yamaha | 1:20.999 | 1:18.826 | +4.267 |
| 25 | 9 | (Italy) Michele Alboreto | Footwork-Ford | 1:21.966 | 1:18.846 | +4.287 |
| 26 | 22 | (Finland) JJ Lehto | Dallara-Judd | 1:21.323 | 1:19.267 | +4.708 |
| 27 | 11 | (Finland) Mika Häkkinen | Lotus-Judd | 1:22.274 | 1:19.491 | +4.932 |
| 28 | 18 | (Italy) Fabrizio Barbazza | AGS-Ford | 1:22.319 | 1:20.110 | +5.551 |
| 29 | 17 | (Italy) Gabriele Tarquini | AGS-Ford | 1:22.737 | 1:20.262 | +5.703 |
| 30 | 10 | (Sweden) Stefan Johansson | Footwork-Ford | 1:24.114 | 1:21.000 | +6.441 |

== Race ==
=== Race report ===
At the start Patrese made a disastrous start and dropped to 10th position on lap 1, so Prost led from Mansell, Senna, Berger, and Alesi, while Bertrand Gachot spun off on the first lap in his Jordan. Berger was out when his engine failed on lap 6, his third consecutive retirement due to engine problems. Patrese started another recovery drive by passing both Piquet and Morbidelli in one fell swoop when Morbidelli botched an overtaking attempt, taking himself out of the running. At the front Mansell pressured Prost and on Lap 21 he made his move taking advantage of traffic to out-brake the French star going into the hairpin. Mansell slowly pulled away but problems at his first tyre stop dropped him back behind Prost. Mansell once again closed on Prost and the two battled it out until Mansell finally managed to take advantage of traffic, again, and took the lead on Lap 54 by this time outbraking Prost around the outside at the hairpin. Mansell pulled away and scored his first win of the season, Prost was second followed by Senna, Alesi, Patrese, and de Cesaris.

This was the 17th win of Mansell's career, thus breaking the record of Grand Prix wins by an English driver, previously held by Stirling Moss.

=== Race classification ===
| Pos | No | Driver | Constructor | Laps | Time/Retired | Grid | Points |
|---|---|---|---|---|---|---|---|
| 1 | 5 | (United Kingdom) Nigel Mansell | Williams-Renault | 72 | 1:38:00.056 | 4 | 10 |
| 2 | 27 | (France) Alain Prost | Ferrari | 72 | + 5.003 | 2 | 6 |
| 3 | 1 | (Brazil) Ayrton Senna | McLaren-Honda | 72 | + 34.934 | 3 | 4 |
| 4 | 28 | (France) Jean Alesi | Ferrari | 72 | + 35.920 | 6 | 3 |
| 5 | 6 | (Italy) Riccardo Patrese | Williams-Renault | 71 | + 1 lap | 1 | 2 |
| 6 | 33 | (Italy) Andrea de Cesaris | Jordan-Ford | 71 | + 1 lap | 13 | 1 |
| 7 | 15 | (Brazil) Maurício Gugelmin | Leyton House-Ilmor | 70 | + 2 laps | 9 | |
| 8 | 20 | (Brazil) Nelson Piquet | Benetton-Ford | 70 | + 2 laps | 7 | |
| 9 | 23 | (Italy) Pierluigi Martini | Minardi-Ferrari | 70 | + 2 laps | 12 | |
| 10 | 12 | (United Kingdom) Johnny Herbert | Lotus-Judd | 70 | + 2 laps | 20 | |
| 11 | 26 | (France) Érik Comas | Ligier-Lamborghini | 70 | + 2 laps | 14 | |
| 12 | 25 | (Belgium) Thierry Boutsen | Ligier-Lamborghini | 69 | + 3 laps | 16 | |
| Ret | 19 | (Brazil) Roberto Moreno | Benetton-Ford | 63 | Physical | 8 | |
| Ret | 4 | (Italy) Stefano Modena | Tyrrell-Honda | 57 | Gearbox | 11 | |
| Ret | 14 | (France) Olivier Grouillard | Fondmetal-Ford | 47 | Oil leak | 21 | |
| Ret | 29 | (France) Éric Bernard | Lola-Ford | 43 | Transmission | 23 | |
| Ret | 22 | (Finland) JJ Lehto | Dallara-Judd | 39 | Tyre | 26 | |
| Ret | 8 | (United Kingdom) Mark Blundell | Brabham-Yamaha | 36 | Spun off | 17 | |
| Ret | 30 | (Japan) Aguri Suzuki | Lola-Ford | 32 | Transmission | 22 | |
| Ret | 9 | (Italy) Michele Alboreto | Footwork-Ford | 31 | Gearbox | 25 | |
| Ret | 7 | (United Kingdom) Martin Brundle | Brabham-Yamaha | 21 | Gearbox | 24 | |
| Ret | 3 | (Japan) Satoru Nakajima | Tyrrell-Honda | 12 | Spun off | 18 | |
| Ret | 24 | (Italy) Gianni Morbidelli | Minardi-Ferrari | 8 | Collision | 10 | |
| Ret | 16 | (Italy) Ivan Capelli | Leyton House-Ilmor | 7 | Spun off | 15 | |
| Ret | 2 | (Austria) Gerhard Berger | McLaren-Honda | 6 | Engine | 5 | |
| Ret | 32 | (Belgium) Bertrand Gachot | Jordan-Ford | 0 | Spun off | 19 | |
| DNQ | 11 | (Finland) Mika Häkkinen | Lotus-Judd | | | | |
| DNQ | 18 | (Italy) Fabrizio Barbazza | AGS-Ford | | | | |
| DNQ | 17 | (Italy) Gabriele Tarquini | AGS-Ford | | | | |
| DNQ | 10 | (Sweden) Stefan Johansson | Footwork-Ford | | | | |
| DNPQ | 21 | (Italy) Emanuele Pirro | Dallara-Judd | | | | |
| DNPQ | 34 | (Italy) Nicola Larini | Lambo-Lamborghini | | | | |
| DNPQ | 35 | (Belgium) Eric van de Poele | Lambo-Lamborghini | | | | |
| DNPQ | 31 | (Portugal) Pedro Chaves | Coloni-Ford | | | | |

== Championship standings after the race ==
Drivers' Championship standings

| | Pos | Driver | Points |
|---|---|---|---|
| | 1 | (Brazil) Ayrton Senna | 48 |
| 2 | 2 | (United Kingdom) Nigel Mansell | 23 |
| 1 | 3 | (Italy) Riccardo Patrese | 22 |
| 1 | 4 | (France) Alain Prost | 17 |
| 2 | 5 | (Brazil) Nelson Piquet | 16 |

Constructors' Championship standings

| | Pos | Constructor | Points |
|---|---|---|---|
| | 1 | (United Kingdom) McLaren-Honda | 58 |
| | 2 | (United Kingdom) Williams-Renault | 45 |
| 1 | 3 | (Italy) Ferrari | 25 |
| 1 | 4 | (United Kingdom) Benetton-Ford | 21 |
| | 5 | (United Kingdom) Tyrrell-Honda | 11 |

- Note: Only the top five positions are included for both sets of standings.

| Previous race: 1991 Mexican Grand Prix | FIA Formula One World Championship; 1991 season | Next race: 1991 British Grand Prix |
| Previous race: 1990 French Grand Prix | French Grand Prix | Next race: 1992 French Grand Prix |
Awards
| Preceded by 1990 Australian Grand Prix | Formula One Promotional Trophy for Race Promoter; 1991 | Succeeded by 1992 French Grand Prix |
