= Steve Nichols =

American engineer (born 1947)

- Born: Stephen Anderson Nichols; 20 February 1947 (age 79); Salt Lake City, Utah
- Occupation: Engineer
- Known for: Formula One car designer
- Notable work: McLaren MP4/4

Stephen Anderson Nichols (born 20 February 1947 in Salt Lake City, Utah) is an American engineer who is best known as a car designer for several Formula One teams from the mid-1980s until 2001.

== Career ==
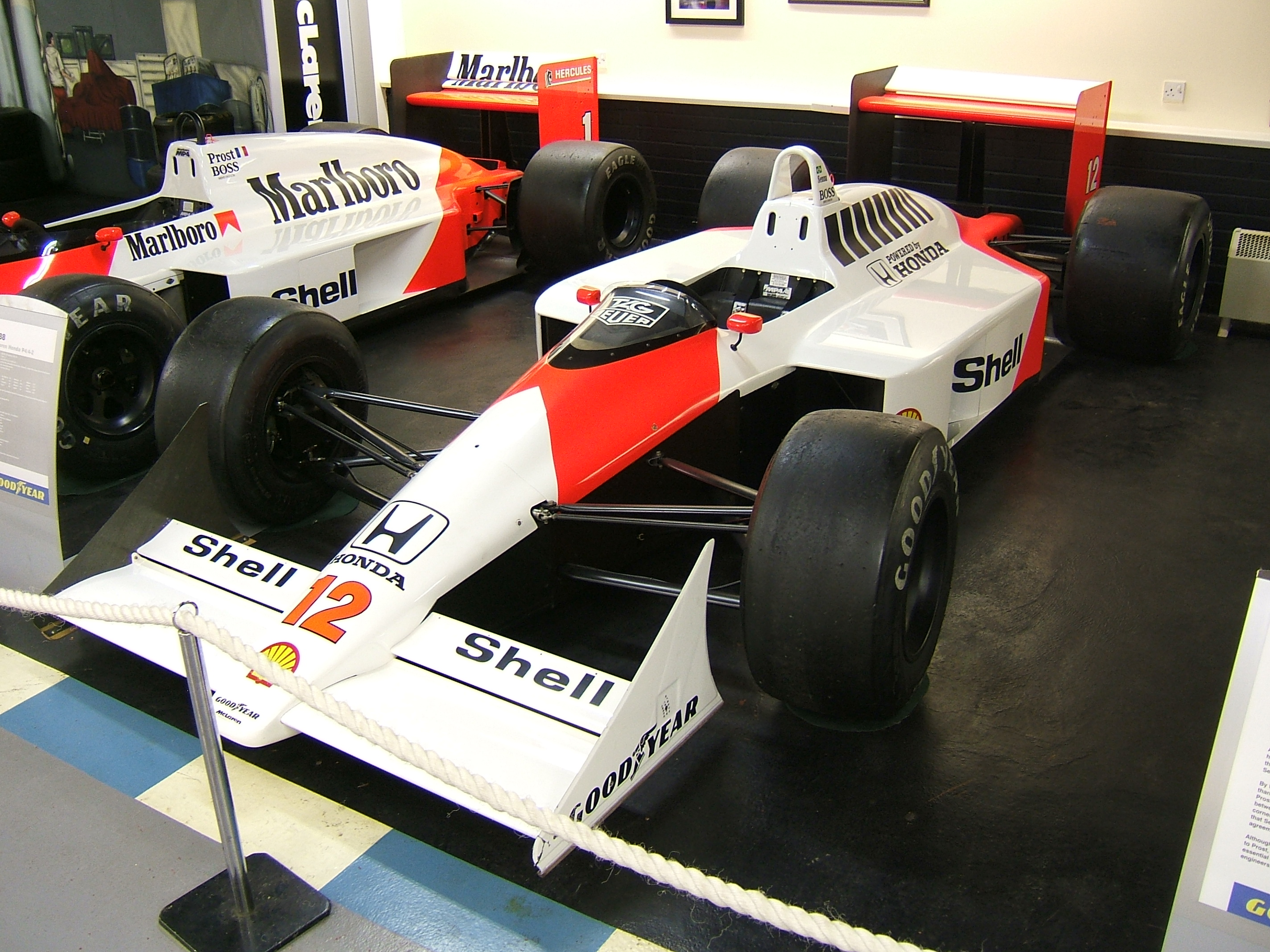
Ayrton Senna's 1988 McLaren MP4/4. In the background is Alain Prost's 1987 McLaren MP4/3.

Steve Nichols graduated from the University of Utah in 1972, and began work as a development engineer at Hercules Aerospace in Salt Lake City. In 1977 he went to work for Gabriel Shock Absorbers at the time when the company was looking to break into motorsport in the US, where he worked on designing dampers that would eventually be used by the likes of Al Unser, Parnelli Jones, Team Penske and A. J. Foyt.

In 1980 Nichols moved into his ultimate goal in motorsport and joined McLaren in Formula One. He had worked with English designer John Barnard at Chaparral in Indy racing designing dampers for the team, and had called him looking for work in Formula One. At the time, Barnard had begun working with Ron Dennis at his Formula 2 team Project Four Racing while they were in the process of their merger/takeover of McLaren. Barnard recruited Nichols to work on his then revolutionary Carbon Fibre monocoque for what would become the McLaren MP4/1. Nichols suggested approaching his old employer Hercules who had been using carbon fibre in the aerospace industry for a number of years. Hercules took on the work, while also getting their name on the McLaren F1 cars as a team sponsor.

In 1982, Nichols became the race engineer for Niki Lauda and remained so until Lauda's retirement after 1985. This included being Lauda's engineer during his 3rd and final World Championship winning season in 1984. Following Lauda's retirement, Nichols became race engineer for 1982 World Champion Keke Rosberg in 1986 and former Ferrari driver Stefan Johansson in 1987. In late 1986, following the departure of John Barnard to Ferrari, Ron Dennis named Nichols as the Chief Designer for both the 1987 and 1988 turbo cars, while Nichols also continued as one of the two race engineers within the team. His first car, the McLaren MP4/3 powered by the turbocharged TAG-Porsche V6 engine, was driven by Alain Prost to three victories in 1987. With five podium finishes also by Stefan Johansson, McLaren achieved second place behind Williams in the Constructors' Championship.

=== McLaren MP4/4 ===
Nichols' second car was the highly successful McLaren MP4/4, powered by a turbocharged Honda V6 rated at approximately 650 bhp (485 kW; 659 PS). The MP4/4, driven by Ayrton Senna (whom Nichols was also the race engineer for in both 1988 and 1989) and Alain Prost, almost completely dominated the 1988 season with 15 race victories from 16 races, as well as 15 pole positions. McLaren also scored a record ten 1-2 finishes in the 16 races. McLaren won the 1988 Constructors' Championship by a then record 134 points from Ferrari, having wrapped up the title in Round 11 in Belgium. Senna and Prost also finished the Drivers' Championship in first and second place, giving Senna his first World Championship.

==== Dispute over design credit ====
While some articles give credit to Gordon Murray for the MP4/4's design and claim that it was based on Murray's earlier Brabham BT55 for the 1986 season, many at McLaren, including former team manager Jo Ramírez, and a number of McLaren's Design Office including the Project Leader on the Monocoque and front suspension Matthew Jeffreys, aerodynamicist Bob Bell and engineer Alan Jenkins, have pointed out that the MP4/4 was a development of the MP4/3 and that Murray, who became McLaren's Technical Director in 1987, had very little to do with the design of either of Nichols' cars.

Commenting on the differences of the BT55 and MP4/4, Nichols remarked:

The only similarity is that they were both low. But if you look at anything else – the rules were different [and therefore] the fuel tank size was different, the drivetrain was different, different engine, different gearbox – everything.

Nichols suggested that Murray has tried to claim credit for the MP4/4 in the hopes that its reputation would overshadow that of the BT55's engine and gearbox issues:

Gordon had the Brabham BT55, which was by any standard a terrible car. He’s got that blot on his copy book. So now I think he feels the need to claim credit for the MP4/4, to expunge the BT55 off his record.

Senior design engineer Matthew Jeffreys also refuted Murray's claims of the Brabham being the basis of the MP4/4:

"None of us were looking at BT55 drawings and we wouldn't have wanted to be either – it was a disaster. Why would we want a McLaren to have copied a car that had huge problems and was also two years old?"

Murray has long denied Nichols' involvement in the MP4/4's development, stating in an interview with Motor Sport: "This thing about Steve Nichols being chief designer is the biggest load of rubbish you've ever heard. The MP4/4 was not designed by Steve Nichols, I can promise you that." Murray also threatened Nichols and Jeffreys with legal action over their written claims in the McLaren MP4/4 Owners’ Workshop Manual written by Steve Rendle and published by Haynes. However, McLaren internal memo's actually written by Murray do clearly put Steve Nichols as the Chief Designer of both the MP4/3 and its highly successful successor, the MP4/4.

=== Later career ===
At the end of 1989, Alain Prost asked Nichols to join him at Ferrari in 1990. By this time, John Barnard had left to join the Benetton team. Taking over as the team's Technical Director, Nichols collaborated with Chief Designer Jean-Claude Migeot on the design of the Ferrari 642 and 643 used by the team in 1991. The cars were largely unsuccessful, and not winning a race with the 643 contributing largely to Prost not only having his first winless season since his rookie year in 1980, but also in being fired from the team following the 1991 Japanese Grand Prix when he said "a truck would be easier to drive than this car". The 643 had been a completely clean-sheet design rather than an update of Barnard's Ferrari 640 like the 641 and 642 were.

Nichols left Ferrari at the end of 1991. He later had brief periods with Sauber and Jordan. In 1995 he was back at McLaren as a technical consultant. He assisted McLaren back to the front of the grid and winning the World Championships in 1998 and 1999.

In 2001 he joined Jaguar Racing as technical director, but his new R3 car was found to have fundamental design problems just before the start of the 2002 season and he was dismissed by Jaguar. He has not worked in Formula One since.

== Retirement ==
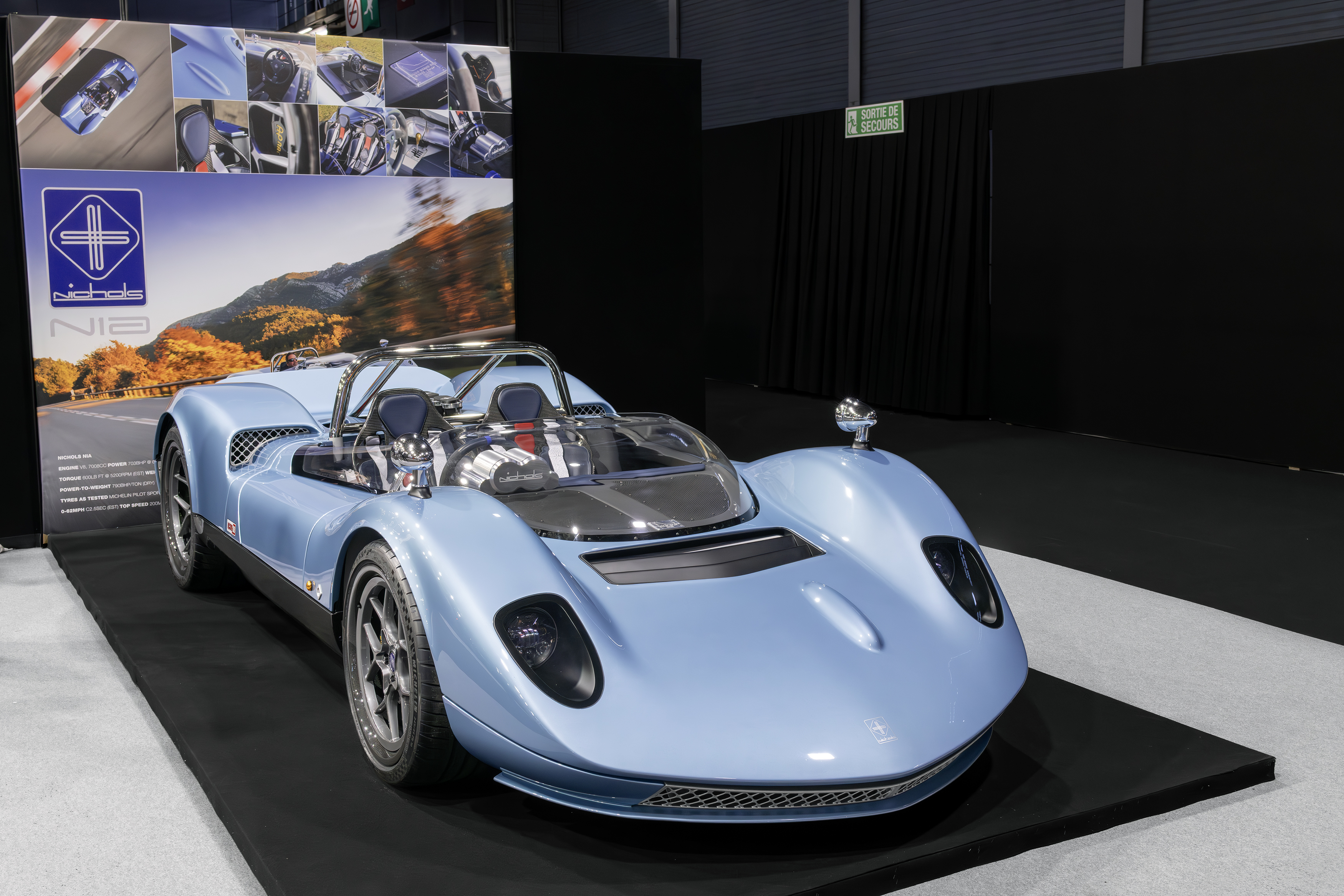
Nichols NIA ICON 88 at Retromobile 2026

In retirement, Nichols works as a freelance design and technical consultant, based in the United Kingdom; he is also an amateur racing driver, racing a Datsun 260ZX in historic racing events and a Van Diemen RF82 in Historic Formula Ford 2000. In 2017, he founded Nichols Cars to market the N1A, a modern road-going interpretation of the McLaren M1A race car; the car was expected to reach production in 2022.
