= Nye (surname) =

Nye is a surname of Old English origin. Notable people with the surname include:

- Aaliyah Nye (born 2002), American basketball player
- Aaron Nye (born 1978), Australian cricketer
- Andrea Nye (born 1939), American feminist philosopher and writer
- Andy Nye (born 1959), English musician
- Archibald Nye (1895–1967), British Army lieutenant-general and Governor of Madras
- Ben Nye (1907–1986), American Hollywood makeup artist
- Bill Nye (born 1955), "the Science Guy", American popular scientist and TV personality
- Blaine Nye (born 1946), American former National Football League player
- Carrie Nye (1936–2006), stage name of American actress Carolyn Nye McGeoy
- Carroll Nye (1901–1974), American film actor
- Chauncey Nye (1823–1900), American pioneer
- Claribel Nye (1889–1960), American home economist
- Cliff Nye, Lebanese rugby league player
- David Nye (disambiguation)
- Dick Nye (fl. 1950s, American sailor
- Doug Nye (born 1945), English journalist
- Edd Nye (born 1932), American politician
- Edgar Wilson Nye (1850–1896), American humorist
- Eva Nye, American politician
- Frank Nye (1852–1935), American politician
- Francis W. Nye (1918–2019), U.S. Air Force major general
- G. Raymond Nye (1889–1965), American silent film actor
- George Nye (disambiguation), several people
- Gideon Nye (1812–1888), American diplomat, art collector, writer and merchant
- Glenn Nye (born 1974), American politician
- Harry Nye (disambiguation), several people
- James W. Nye (1815–1876), U.S. Senator
- Jody Lynn Nye (born 1957), American science fiction author
- John Nye (disambiguation), several people
- Joseph Nye (1937–2025), American academic and political theorist
- Kim Nye (born 1961), New Zealand former footballer
- Lee Nye (1926–1999), American photographer
- Lisa Nye (born 1966), English cricketer
- Louis Nye (1913–2005), American actor and comedian
- Mark Nye (bishop) (1909–1993), Anglican bishop and political prisoner in apartheid-era South Africa
- Mark Nye (politician) (1945–2022), American politician
- Mary Jo Nye (born 1944), American historian of science and professor
- Mortimer Nye (1838–1901), American politician
- Myra Nye (1875—1955), American journalist and writer
- Naomi Shihab Nye (born 1952), Palestinian-American poet and songwriter
- Nathaniel Nye (1624–1647), English mathematician
- Nelson C. Nye (1907–1997), American author, editor and reviewer of Western fiction
- Niel Nye (1914–2003), British archdeacon
- Olin T. Nye (1872–1943), American lawyer
- Pat Nye (1908–1994), English actress
- Peter Nye (1921–2009), British soil scientist
- Phila Calder Nye (1871–1959), American art historian
- Philip Nye (c. 1595–1672) was an English theologian and key adviser to Oliver Cromwell on matters of religion.
- Ray J. Nye (1871–1937), American politician
- Rich Nye (born 1944), American former Major League Baseball pitcher
- Richard Nye (born 1967), English composer
- Robert Nye (1939–2016), British novelist, poet and playwright
- Russel B. Nye (1913–1993), American English professor, author and historian of popular culture
- Ruth Nye (born 1932), Australian pianist
- Ryan Nye (born 1973), American baseball player
- Simon Nye (born 1958), British comedy writer, creator of the sitcom Men Behaving Badly
- Stephen Nye (1648–1719), English clergyman and theological writer
- Steve Nye, music producer and keyboardist
- Susan Nye, Baroness Nye (born 1955), British civil servant
- Thomas Avery Nye Jr. (born 1940), American politician
- Wallace G. Nye (1859–1926), 25th mayor of Minneapolis, Minnesota, United States
- William Nye (disambiguation)
