= 1982 Formula One World Championship =

36th season of FIA Formula One motor racing

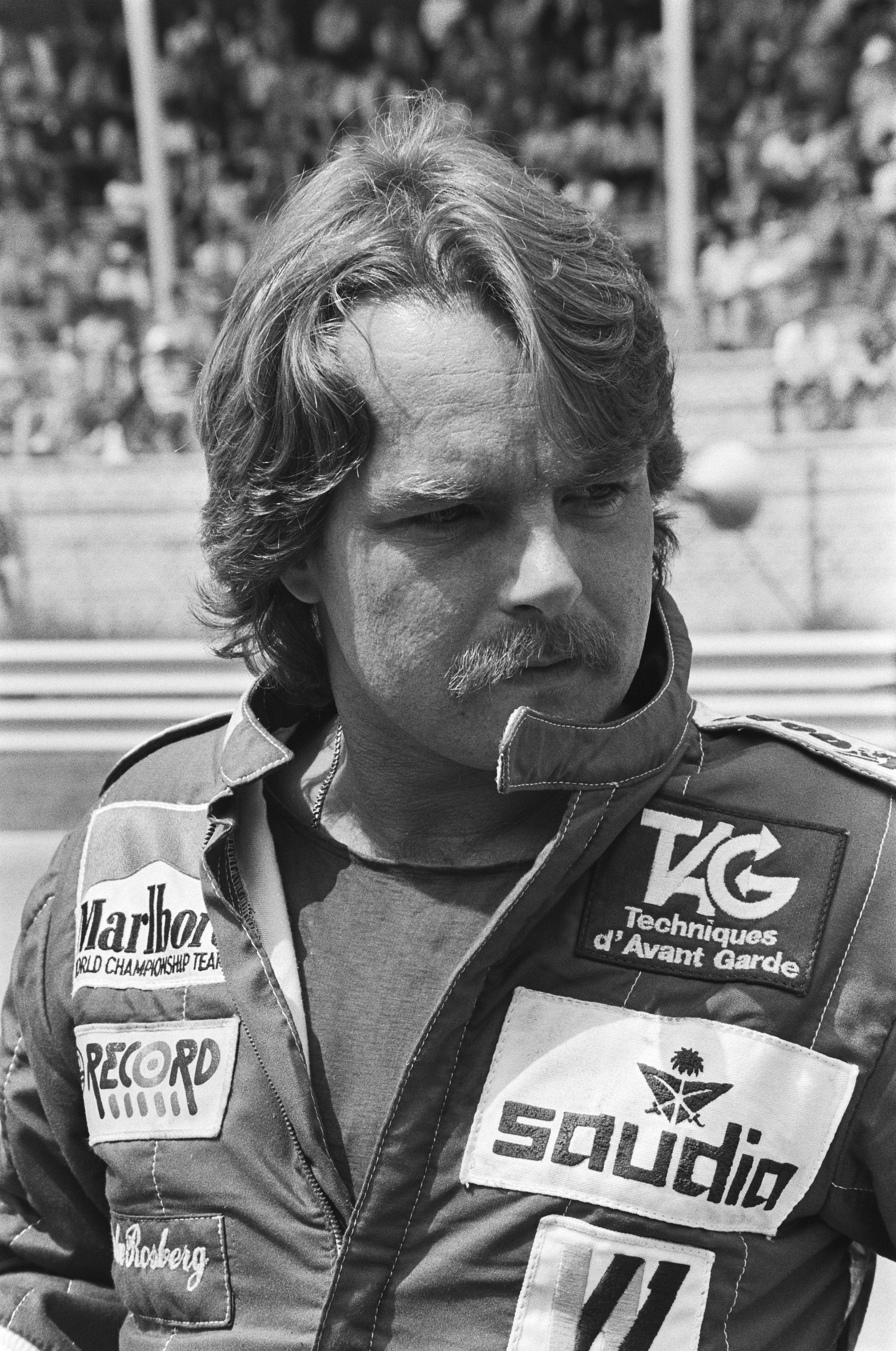
Keke Rosberg won his first and only Drivers' Championship with Williams with 44 points, despite having trailed for most of the season and having only won one race.

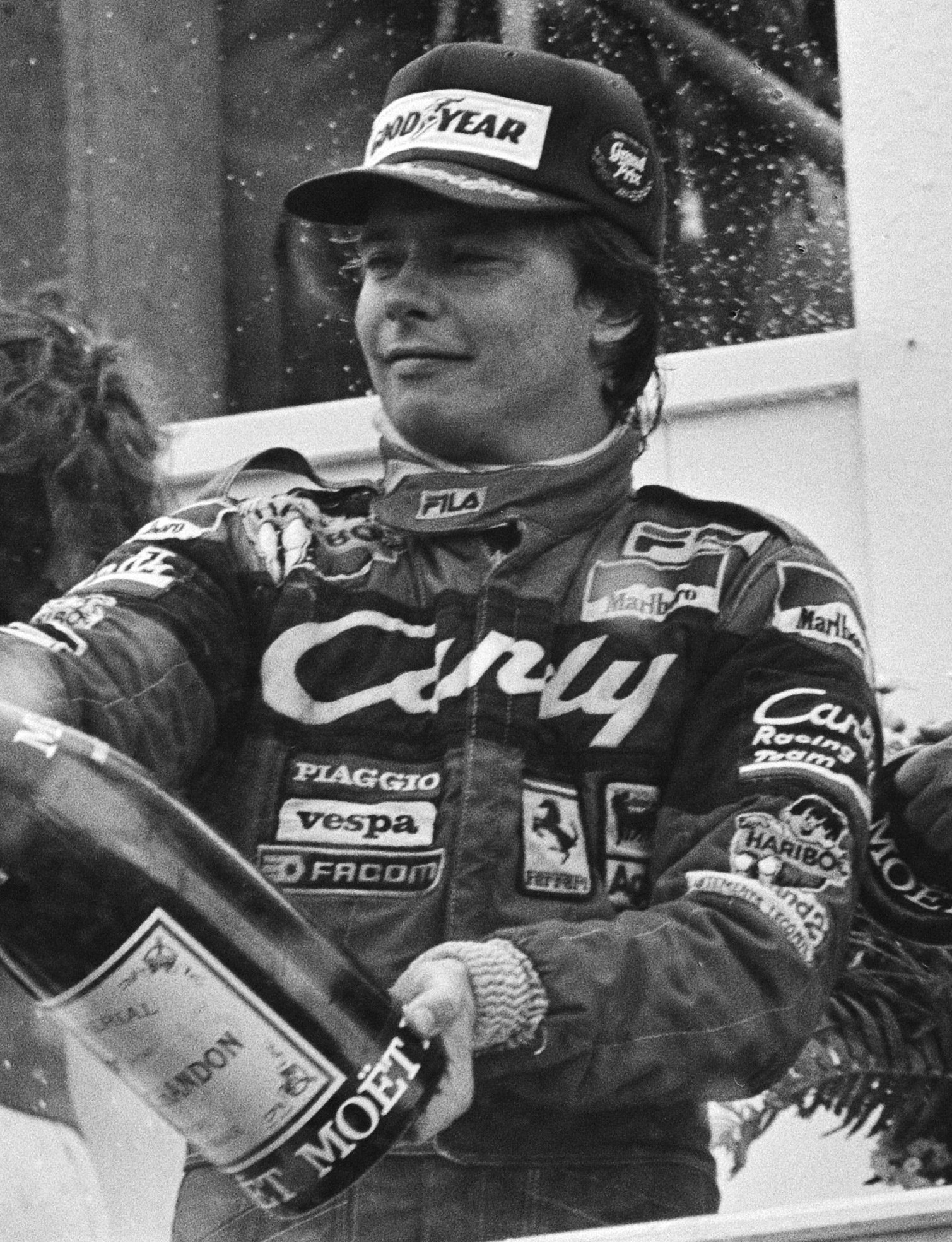
Didier Pironi, driving for Ferrari, finished runner-up with 39 points. He led the championship until suffering career-ending injuries in qualifying for the German Grand Prix, missing the final five rounds.

John Watson (pictured in 1975), driving for McLaren, finished third, losing the tie-break on countback to Pironi after both scored 39 points.

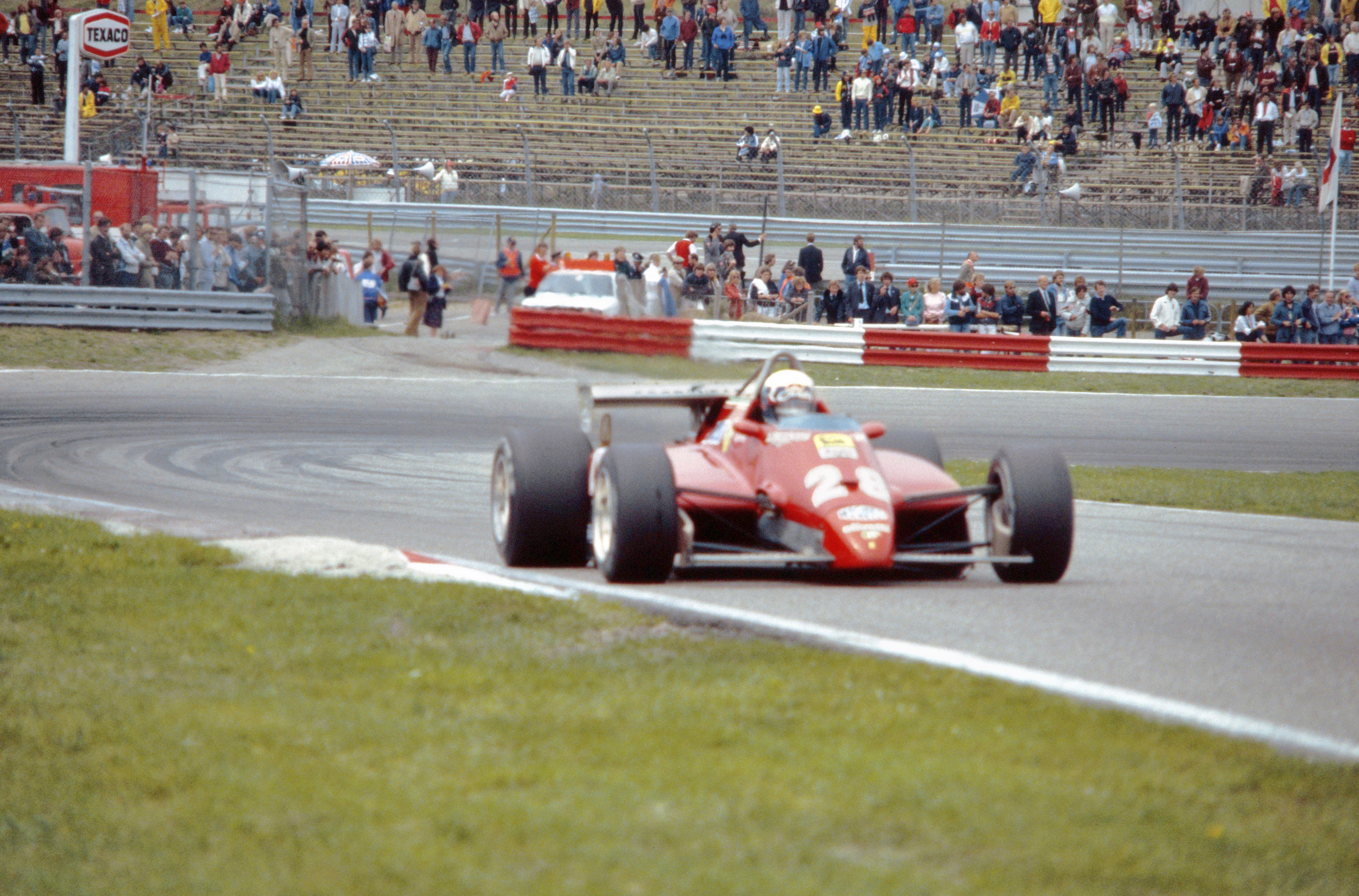
Ferrari won the Constructors' Championship with the 126C2.

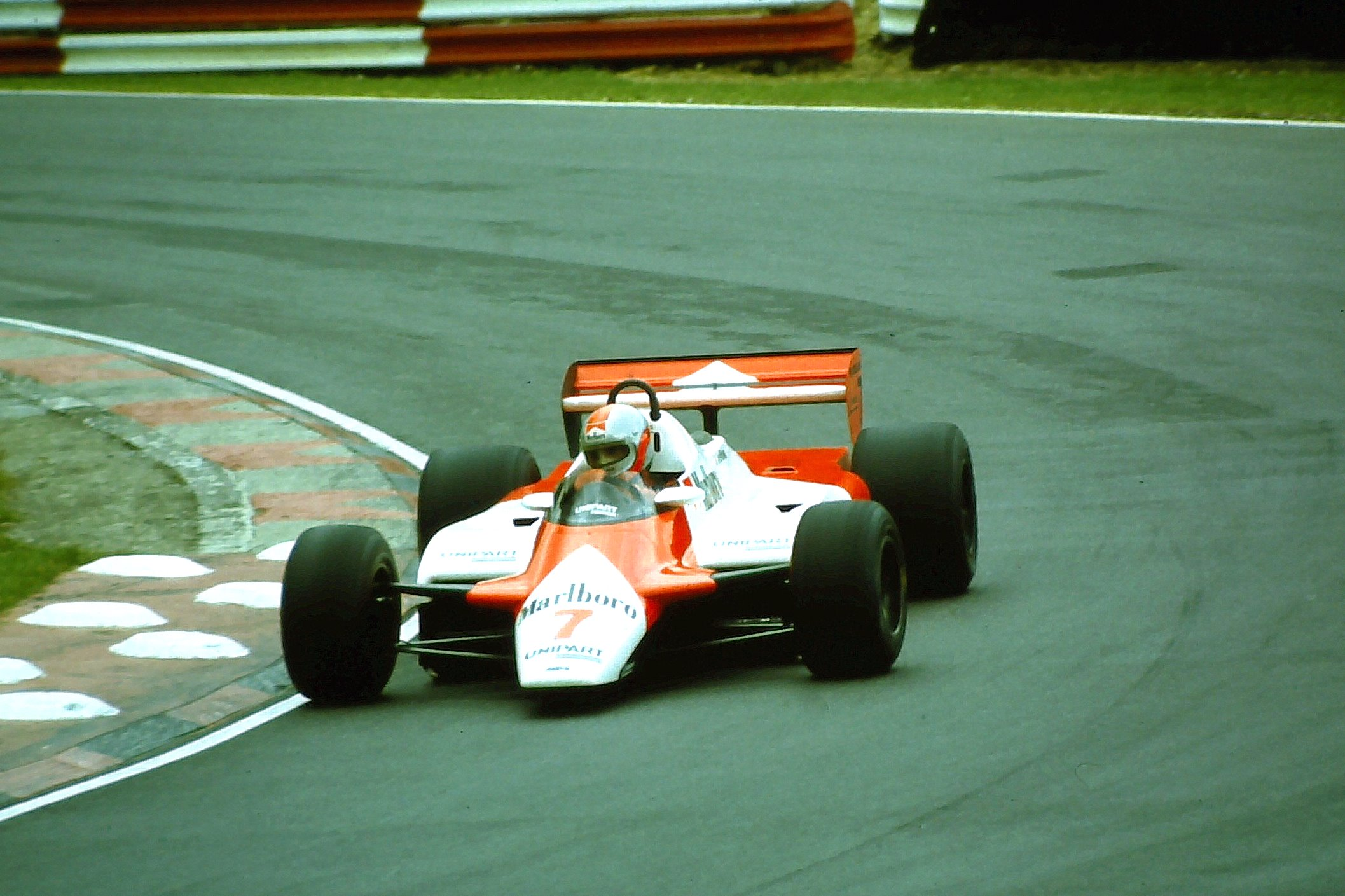
McLaren placed second with the MP4B.

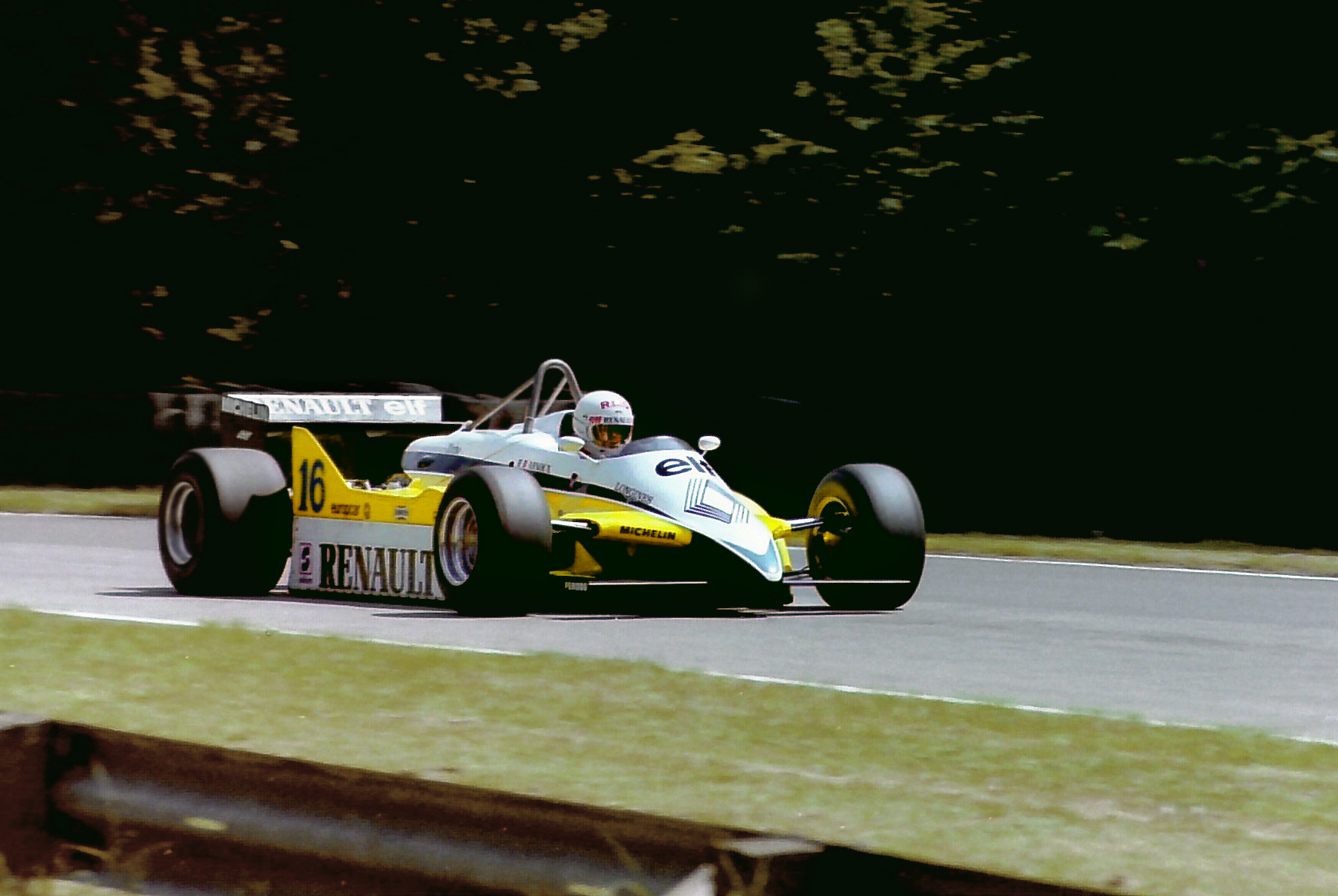
Renault placed third with the RE30B.

The 1982 FIA Formula One World Championship was the 36th season of FIA Formula One motor racing. It included two competitions run over the course of the year, the 33rd Formula One World Championship for Drivers and the 25th Formula One World Championship for Constructors. The season featured sixteen rounds between 23 January and 25 September. The Drivers' Championship was won by Keke Rosberg and the Constructors' Championship by Scuderia Ferrari.

The Championship started with a drivers' strike at the season opener in South Africa and saw a partial race boycott as part of the ongoing FISA–FOCA war at the San Marino Grand Prix. Two drivers died during 1982: Gilles Villeneuve during qualifying for the Belgian Grand Prix and Riccardo Paletti at the start of the Canadian Grand Prix. Championship front-runner Didier Pironi also suffered a career-ending accident while qualifying for the German Grand Prix. These incidents and several other major accidents led to regulation changes to increase driver safety for the 1983 season. Motorsport journalist Nigel Roebuck later wrote that 1982 was "an ugly year, pock-marked by tragedy, by dissension, by greed, and yet, paradoxically, it produced some of the most memorable racing ever seen".

Eventual champion Rosberg won only one race all season – the Swiss Grand Prix – but consistency gave him the Drivers' Championship, five points clear of Pironi and John Watson. Rosberg was the second driver to win the championship having won only one race in the season, after Mike Hawthorn in 1958. Eleven different drivers from seven different teams won a race during the season, with no driver winning more than twice; there was also a run of nine different winners in nine consecutive races from the Monaco Grand Prix to the Swiss Grand Prix. Ferrari, who replaced Villeneuve with Patrick Tambay and Pironi with 1978 World Champion Mario Andretti, managed to score enough points to secure the Constructors' Championship, finishing five points clear of McLaren with Renault third. Rosberg's team Williams finished fourth in the Constructors' standing a further four points behind McLaren, marking the only time since the Constructors' Championship was introduced in 1958 that a team containing the eventual Drivers' Champion finished outside the top 3 of the Constructors' standings.

== Drivers and constructors ==
The following teams and drivers took part in the 1982 Formula One World Championship:

List of entrants into the 1982 Formula One World Championship
Entrant	Constructor	Chassis	Engine	Tyres	No.	Driver	Rounds
(United Kingdom) Parmalat Racing	Brabham-BMW	BT50	BMW M12/13 1.5 L4t	G	1	(Brazil) Nelson Piquet	1, 5–16
(United Kingdom) Parmalat Racing	Brabham-BMW	BT50	BMW M12/13 1.5 L4t	G	2	(Italy) Riccardo Patrese	1, 5, 9–16
(United Kingdom) Parmalat Racing	Brabham-Ford	BT49C; BT49D	Ford Cosworth DFV 3.0 V8	G	1	(Brazil) Nelson Piquet	2–3
(United Kingdom) Parmalat Racing	Brabham-Ford	BT49C; BT49D	Ford Cosworth DFV 3.0 V8	G	2	(Italy) Riccardo Patrese	2–3, 6–8
(United Kingdom) Team Tyrrell	Tyrrell-Ford	011	Ford Cosworth DFV 3.0 V8	G	3	(Italy) Michele Alboreto	All
(United Kingdom) Team Tyrrell	Tyrrell-Ford	011	Ford Cosworth DFV 3.0 V8	G	4	(Sweden) Slim Borgudd	1–3
(United Kingdom) Team Tyrrell	Tyrrell-Ford	011	Ford Cosworth DFV 3.0 V8	G	4	(United Kingdom) Brian Henton	4–16
(United Kingdom) TAG Williams Team	Williams-Ford	FW07C; FW07D; FW08	Ford Cosworth DFV 3.0 V8	G	5	(Argentina) Carlos Reutemann	1–2
(United Kingdom) TAG Williams Team	Williams-Ford	FW07C; FW07D; FW08	Ford Cosworth DFV 3.0 V8	G	5	(United States) Mario Andretti	3
(United Kingdom) TAG Williams Team	Williams-Ford	FW07C; FW07D; FW08	Ford Cosworth DFV 3.0 V8	G	5	(Republic of Ireland) Derek Daly	5–16
(United Kingdom) TAG Williams Team	Williams-Ford	FW07C; FW07D; FW08	Ford Cosworth DFV 3.0 V8	G	6	(Finland) Keke Rosberg	1–3, 5–16
(United Kingdom) Marlboro McLaren International	McLaren-Ford	MP4/1B	Ford Cosworth DFV 3.0 V8	M	7	(United Kingdom) John Watson	1–3, 5–16
(United Kingdom) Marlboro McLaren International	McLaren-Ford	MP4/1B	Ford Cosworth DFV 3.0 V8	M	8	(Austria) Niki Lauda	1–3, 5–16
(West Germany) Team ATS	ATS-Ford	D5	Ford Cosworth DFV 3.0 V8	A M	9	(West Germany) Manfred Winkelhock	All
(West Germany) Team ATS	ATS-Ford	D5	Ford Cosworth DFV 3.0 V8	A M	10	(Chile) Eliseo Salazar	All
(United Kingdom) John Player Team Lotus	Lotus-Ford	87B; 91	Ford Cosworth DFV 3.0 V8	G	11	(Italy) Elio de Angelis	1–3, 5–16
(United Kingdom) John Player Team Lotus	Lotus-Ford	87B; 91	Ford Cosworth DFV 3.0 V8	G	12	(United Kingdom) Nigel Mansell	1–3, 5–8, 10, 12–16
(United Kingdom) John Player Team Lotus	Lotus-Ford	87B; 91	Ford Cosworth DFV 3.0 V8	G	12	(Brazil) Roberto Moreno	9
(United Kingdom) John Player Team Lotus	Lotus-Ford	87B; 91	Ford Cosworth DFV 3.0 V8	G	12	(United Kingdom) Geoff Lees	11
(United Kingdom) Ensign Racing	Ensign-Ford	N180B; N181	Ford Cosworth DFV 3.0 V8	A M	14	(Colombia) Roberto Guerrero	1–3, 5–16
(France) Équipe Renault Elf	Renault	RE30B	Renault-Gordini EF1 1.5 V6t	M	15	(France) Alain Prost	All
(France) Équipe Renault Elf	Renault	RE30B	Renault-Gordini EF1 1.5 V6t	M	16	(France) René Arnoux	All
(United Kingdom) March Grand Prix Team (United Kingdom) Rothmans Racing with March Grand Prix (United Kingdom) LBT Team March	March-Ford	821	Ford Cosworth DFV 3.0 V8	P A M	17	(West Germany) Jochen Mass	1–3, 5–11
(United Kingdom) March Grand Prix Team (United Kingdom) Rothmans Racing with March Grand Prix (United Kingdom) LBT Team March	March-Ford	821	Ford Cosworth DFV 3.0 V8	P A M	17	(United Kingdom) Rupert Keegan	12–16
(United Kingdom) March Grand Prix Team (United Kingdom) Rothmans Racing with March Grand Prix (United Kingdom) LBT Team March	March-Ford	821	Ford Cosworth DFV 3.0 V8	P A M	18	(Brazil) Raul Boesel	1–3, 5–16
(United Kingdom) March Grand Prix Team (United Kingdom) Rothmans Racing with March Grand Prix (United Kingdom) LBT Team March	March-Ford	821	Ford Cosworth DFV 3.0 V8	P A M	19	(Spain) Emilio de Villota	5–9
(Brazil) Fittipaldi Automotive	Fittipaldi-Ford	F8D; F9	Ford Cosworth DFV 3.0 V8	P	20	(Brazil) Chico Serra	1–3, 5–16
(Italy) Marlboro Team Alfa Romeo	Alfa Romeo	179D; 182; 182B	Alfa Romeo 1260 3.0 V12	M	22	(Italy) Andrea de Cesaris	All
(Italy) Marlboro Team Alfa Romeo	Alfa Romeo	179D; 182; 182B	Alfa Romeo 1260 3.0 V12	M	23	(Italy) Bruno Giacomelli	All
(France) Équipe Talbot Gitanes	Talbot Ligier-Matra	JS17B; JS19	Matra MS81 3.0 V12	M	25	(United States) Eddie Cheever	1–3, 5–16
(France) Équipe Talbot Gitanes	Talbot Ligier-Matra	JS17B; JS19	Matra MS81 3.0 V12	M	26	(France) Jacques Laffite	1–3, 5–16
(Italy) Ferrari	Ferrari	126C2	Ferrari 021 1.5 V6t	G	27	(Canada) Gilles Villeneuve	1–5
(Italy) Ferrari	Ferrari	126C2	Ferrari 021 1.5 V6t	G	27	(France) Patrick Tambay	9–16
(Italy) Ferrari	Ferrari	126C2	Ferrari 021 1.5 V6t	G	28	(France) Didier Pironi	1–12
(Italy) Ferrari	Ferrari	126C2	Ferrari 021 1.5 V6t	G	28	(United States) Mario Andretti	15–16
(United Kingdom) Ragno Arrows	Arrows-Ford	A4; A5	Ford Cosworth DFV 3.0 V8	P	29	(United Kingdom) Brian Henton	1–3
(United Kingdom) Ragno Arrows	Arrows-Ford	A4; A5	Ford Cosworth DFV 3.0 V8	P	29	(Switzerland) Marc Surer	5–16
(United Kingdom) Ragno Arrows	Arrows-Ford	A4; A5	Ford Cosworth DFV 3.0 V8	P	30	(Italy) Mauro Baldi	1–3, 5–16
(Italy) Denim S.A.I.M.A. Team Osella	Osella-Ford	FA1C; FA1D	Ford Cosworth DFV 3.0 V8	P	31	(France) Jean-Pierre Jarier	All
(Italy) Denim S.A.I.M.A. Team Osella	Osella-Ford	FA1C; FA1D	Ford Cosworth DFV 3.0 V8	P	32	(Italy) Riccardo Paletti	1–8
(Hong Kong) Theodore Racing Team	Theodore-Ford	TY01; TY02	Ford Cosworth DFV 3.0 V8	A G	33	(Republic of Ireland) Derek Daly	1–3
(Hong Kong) Theodore Racing Team	Theodore-Ford	TY01; TY02	Ford Cosworth DFV 3.0 V8	A G	33	(Netherlands) Jan Lammers	5–7, 9–11
(Hong Kong) Theodore Racing Team	Theodore-Ford	TY01; TY02	Ford Cosworth DFV 3.0 V8	A G	33	(United Kingdom) Geoff Lees	8
(Hong Kong) Theodore Racing Team	Theodore-Ford	TY01; TY02	Ford Cosworth DFV 3.0 V8	A G	33	(Republic of Ireland) Tommy Byrne	12–16
(United Kingdom) Candy Toleman Motorsport (United Kingdom) Toleman Group Motorsport	Toleman-Hart	TG181B; TG181C; TG183	Hart 415T 1.5 L4t	P	35	(United Kingdom) Derek Warwick	1–6, 9–16
(United Kingdom) Candy Toleman Motorsport (United Kingdom) Toleman Group Motorsport	Toleman-Hart	TG181B; TG181C; TG183	Hart 415T 1.5 L4t	P	36	(Italy) Teo Fabi	1–6, 9–16

Tyre manufacturers
Key
Symbol	Tyre manufacturer
A	Avon
G	Goodyear
M	Michelin
P	Pirelli

=== Team changes ===
All teams and constructors who had competed in 1981 returned for the new season. Brabham had entered an engine supply deal with German car manufacturer BMW for the use of their inline-four turbo engines. The team announced in January that they were committing to the use of the new BMW engine throughout the season, but after experiencing reliability problems with it, they reverted to the Cosworth DFV motor several times during the season.

=== Driver changes ===
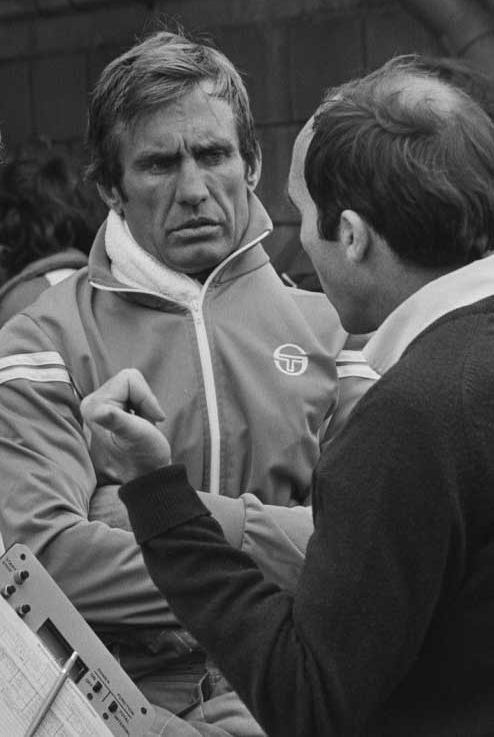
Carlos Reutemann (pictured in 1981) stayed with the team of Frank Williams (right), only to retire from the sport after two races.

At the end of the 1981 season, both Williams drivers, 1980 World Champion Alan Jones and Carlos Reutemann, had announced their retirement from racing. Reutemann did in fact return for 1982, competing in the first two races, before retiring unexpectedly at the end of March. Jones was replaced by Keke Rosberg, who had previously entered 36 Grands Prix, with a third-place finish as his best result.

The off season saw rumours of several former champions returning to the sport, (Note: Former World Champions Jackie Stewart and James Hunt were rumoured to return to the sport at the end of the 1981 season.) but in the end only double World Champion Niki Lauda returned to Formula One after an absence of two years to partner John Watson at McLaren. Ferrari and Renault retained their race-winning line-ups of Gilles Villeneuve and Didier Pironi and Alain Prost and René Arnoux, respectively. At Brabham, defending World Champion Nelson Piquet remained with the team, and was partnered by Riccardo Patrese, who moved from Arrows to replace Héctor Rebaque.

The Osella team gave Riccardo Paletti his Grand Prix debut, while Toleman replaced Brian Henton with Teo Fabi, also a newcomer to Formula One. Marc Surer was hired by Arrows, but broke both his feet in pre-season testing at Kyalami. He was set to be replaced by Patrick Tambay, who was then fired after taking part in the drivers' strike at that race and the seat went to Henton. Eliseo Salazar transferred from Ensign Racing to the ATS team.

Mid-season changes

Following Reutemann's retirement, Williams hired 1978 World Champion Mario Andretti as a one-off replacement for the United States Grand Prix West. Derek Daly then became the permanent second driver at the team, as Andretti had racing obligations in the United States to fulfill. Andretti returned with Ferrari for the last two races of the season, replacing Pironi, who had suffered career-ending injuries at the German Grand Prix. Villeneuve, who died following a crash in qualifying for the Belgian Grand Prix, was replaced by Tambay starting from the Dutch Grand Prix.

At Team Lotus, Nigel Mansell missed two races due to injuries from a crash in Canada. His substitute at the Dutch Grand Prix was Roberto Moreno, who failed to qualify. Mansell attempted a comeback at Brands Hatch, but was again replaced at the French Grand Prix, this time by Geoff Lees. An accident at the race in France led Jochen Mass, already deeply shaken by the fatal crash of Villeneuve, in which he was involved, to walk away from Grand Prix racing. He was replaced at March by Rupert Keegan. Swedish driver Slim Borgudd had moved from ATS to Tyrrell in the off season, but was forced to leave the team after only three races when his sponsorship money ran out. Henton took his place from the Belgian Grand Prix onwards, as Surer returned to Arrows after his injuries had healed.

== Calendar ==
A race in downtown Detroit was one of two new events on the calendar for 1982.

Round	Grand Prix	Circuit	Date
1	South African Grand Prix	(South Africa) Kyalami Grand Prix Circuit, Midrand	23 January
2	Brazilian Grand Prix	(Brazil) Autodromo Jacarepaguá, Rio de Janeiro	21 March
3	United States Grand Prix West	(United States) Long Beach Street Circuit, California	4 April
4	San Marino Grand Prix	(Italy) Autodromo Dino Ferrari, Imola	25 April
5	Belgian Grand Prix	(Belgium) Circuit Zolder, Heusden-Zolder	9 May
6	Monaco Grand Prix	Circuit de Monaco, Monte Carlo	23 May
7	Detroit Grand Prix	(United States) Detroit Street Circuit, Michigan	6 June
8	Canadian Grand Prix	(Canada) Circuit Gilles Villeneuve, Montreal	13 June
9	Dutch Grand Prix	(Netherlands) Circuit Park Zandvoort, Zandvoort	3 July
10	British Grand Prix	(United Kingdom) Brands Hatch, West Kingsdown	18 July
11	French Grand Prix	(France) Circuit Paul Ricard, Le Castellet	25 July
12	German Grand Prix	(West Germany) Hockenheimring, Hockenheim	8 August
13	Austrian Grand Prix	(Austria) Österreichring, Spielberg	15 August
14	Swiss Grand Prix	(France) Circuit de Dijon-Prenois, Dijon	29 August
15	Italian Grand Prix	(Italy) Autodromo Nazionale di Monza, Monza	12 September
16	Caesars Palace Grand Prix (Note: Saturday race)	(United States) Caesars Palace Grand Prix Circuit, Las Vegas	25 September

The Australian Grand Prix was a reserve, with a date of 3 October.

=== Calendar changes ===
The Argentine Grand Prix was scheduled to take place on 7 March, but was cancelled due to lack of sponsors, as several pulled out due to uncertainty following the drivers' strike in the opening race. The Grand Prix was also cancelled due to political unrest in Argentina.

The Spanish Grand Prix was omitted from the calendar for several reasons. The Circuito del Jarama, where the race had been held the previous year, was unpopular with the drivers. In addition, the organisers had failed to pay their fees for 1981. Although the race was re-instated for 27 June after the organisers had paid off their debts to the Formula One Constructors' Association (FOCA), protests from the teams over the dangerous nature, the very narrow track, and outdated facilities of the Jarama venue led to the race being cancelled.

Two new races were added to the calendar compared to 1981: the Detroit Grand Prix and the Swiss Grand Prix, the latter to be held at Circuit de Dijon-Prenois in France since motor racing has been outlawed in Switzerland since the 1955 Le Mans disaster. (Note: In 2015, Switzerland partially lifted the ban on motor racing, but just for fully electric vehicles, such as Formula E.) The addition of Detroit meant that the United States hosted three Grands Prix, the only time one country had more than two races in one season until 2020, when Italy also hosted three Grands Prix.

== Background ==
=== Politics ===
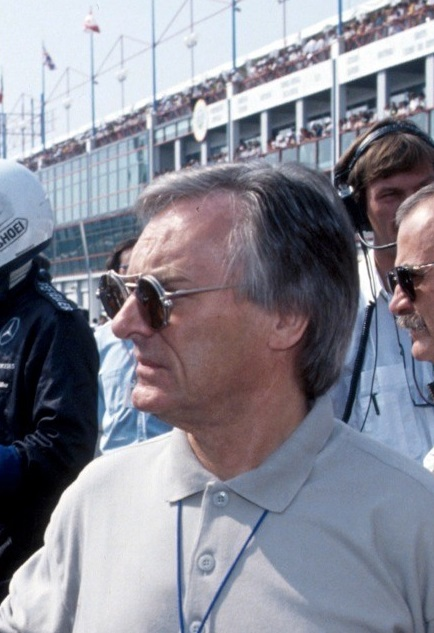
Bernie Ecclestone (pictured in 1991), owner of Brabham and chairman of FOCA, was one of the leading figures in the FISA–FOCA war.

Starting in the early 1970s, Bernie Ecclestone, owner of the Brabham team, had seized control of the Formula 1 Constructors Association, later renamed Formula One Constructors' Association. In this role, he began to negotiate more lucrative contracts between the teams and the track owners, including obtaining full control over television rights for FOCA. Realising the growing influence of Ecclestone and FOCA, the sport's governing body, the Fédération Internationale de l'Automobile (FIA) and its head, Paul Metternich, instated Frenchman Jean-Marie Balestre as the head of the Commission Sportive Internationale in 1978, which was then renamed to Fédération Internationale du Sport Automobile (FISA). FIA delegated running of the sporting regulations governing Formula One to FISA.

Over the following years, a power struggle developed between FOCA and FISA and Ecclestone and Balestre in particular. This conflict is generally referred to as the FISA–FOCA war. FOCA consisted of the majorly British constructor teams, while the manufacturer or "works" teams (Renault, Ferrari, Alfa Romeo and Talbot-Ligier), together with Osella and Toleman were aligned with FISA. (Note: Lang gives the FISA teams in 1980 as "Ferrari, Renault, Alfa-Romeo, Talbot-Ligier and Osella". By April 1982, Toleman has been added to the list, but "Guy Ligier had recently switched allegiance to FOCA".)

The conflict came to a head at the 1980 Spanish Grand Prix, where the drivers of teams belonging to FOCA boycotted the obligatory drivers' briefing and were threatened by FISA with having their licences revoked. The race went ahead as a non-championship event, without the non-FOCA aligned teams participating.

Following an aborted attempt to establish a breakaway World Championship, FOCA agreed to the Concorde Agreement with FISA in March 1981. This agreement stipulated that all teams were obliged to attend all rounds of the championship, while at the same time settling differences over future regulation changes.

=== Regulation changes and technological development ===
==== Sporting regulations ====
The new rules for the 1982 season included an increase in the number of cars permitted to enter a Grand Prix from 30 to 34, and the number of starters from 24 to 26. (Note: The exemption to this rule was the Monaco Grand Prix, where only 20 cars were allowed to take the start, due to the narrow nature of the track.) To avoid having all 34 cars on the track at one time, a pre-qualifying session was introduced in which the three teams with the worst record in the previous year would compete to be allowed into qualification proper. Just as the previous year, the best eleven results from all the races counted towards the Drivers' Championship. All races counted towards the Manufacturers Championship.

==== Technology ====
In the years leading up to 1982, two major technological developments had shaped Formula One: the turbocharged engine and "ground effect". In 1977, Lotus had revolutionised aerodynamics in Formula One by introducing the Lotus 78, known as the "wing car". The car used what is commonly referred to as "ground effect", with the physical principle applied being the "Venturi effect". The sides of the underside of the car would be shut off with skirts to trap the under-pressure airflow underneath the car, effectively "sucking" the vehicle to the ground. This led to increased cornering speeds, but at the same time brought implications that had an adverse effect on the drivers' safety. Moveable skirts were thus banned in 1981, accompanied by a minimum ride height for the cars of 6 cm (2.4 in), targeted at minimising the "ground effect" and to reduce cornering speed.

For 1982, both regulations were reversed as a result of the new Concorde Agreement. The skirts around the underpart of the chassis, which locked the airflow underneath the car, necessitated very stiff suspensions to work properly. This meant that every bump on track was putting enormous strain on the drivers, shaking them around in the cockpit. Additionally, the cornering speed and the resulting high g-forces put pressure on both the drivers and the cars' suspensions, making them prone to breaking. The cars would also move up and down on the road, in an effect called "porpoising", making the cars very hard to control. These adverse effects were particularly impactful at bumpy circuits, such as Jacarepaguá, where Riccardo Patrese retired due to exhaustion. Other drivers reported dizziness and blurred vision.

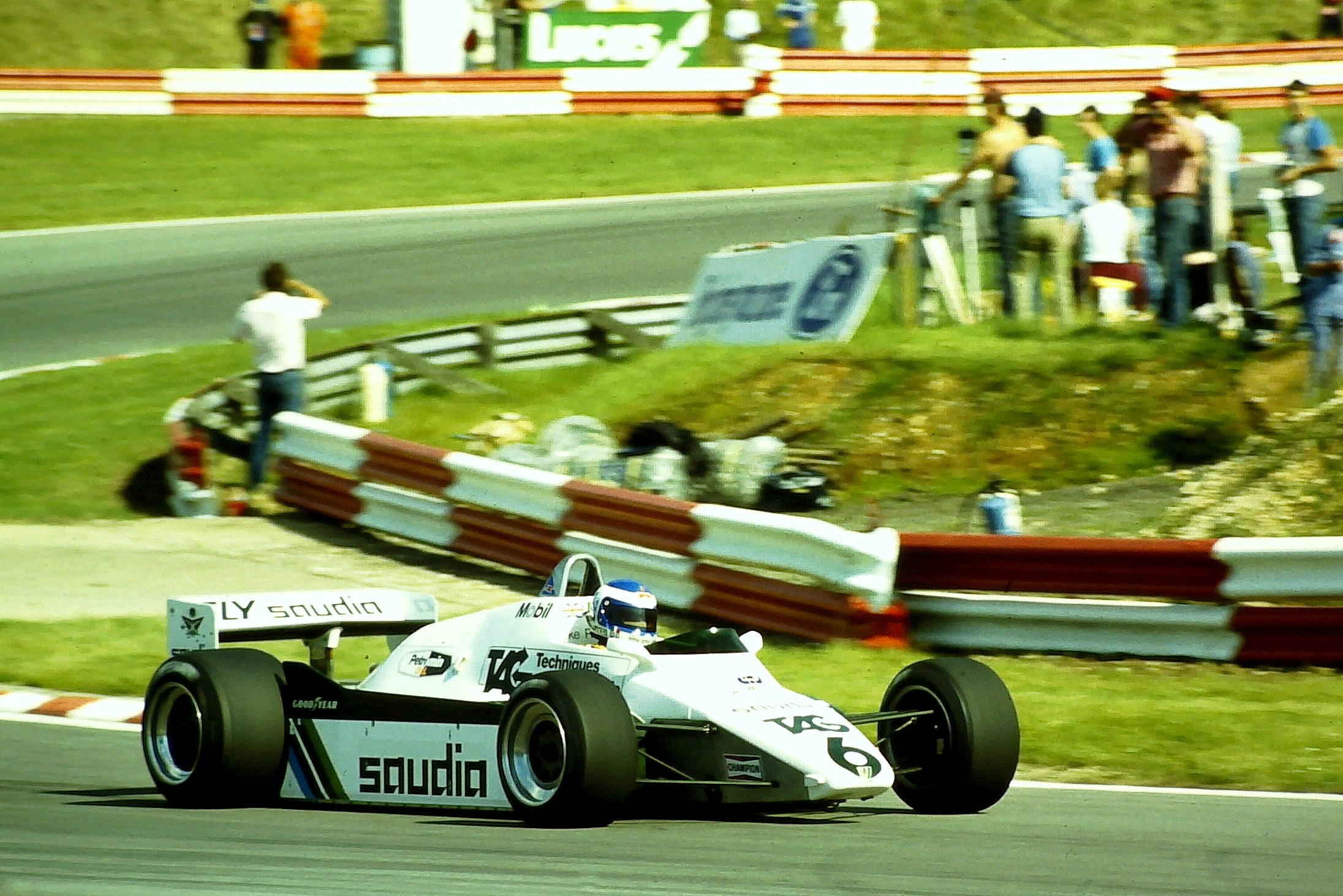
The Cosworth DFV-powered Williams FW08 was the last naturally aspirated car used to win the Drivers' Championship until 1989. Pictured here is eventual World Champion Keke Rosberg at the British Grand Prix.

The potentially dangerous implications of "ground effect" were only worsened by the advent of very powerful turbocharged engines. In 1977, Renault had introduced the first turbocharged engine into the sport with their Renault RS01. The regulations at the time allowed for either three-litre normally aspirated or 1.5-litre turbocharged engines, with Renault being the first to attempt to go the latter route. Over the next few seasons, the turbo engines proved fast, yet unreliable. The cars also suffered from an effect often labelled "turbo lag", meaning that a significant and indeterminable time gap existed between applying the throttle of the car and the point when the full power of the turbo was taking effect. This made the turbo cars very difficult to drive. In 1979, Renault took the first victory with a turbo-charged engine. In 1981, Ferrari had followed them by introducing their own turbo engine. Additionally, the Toleman team also used turbo engines for 1982, supplied by Hart, while Brabham started using turbocharged BMW engines at some, but not all, rounds that year.

Alfa Romeo retained what motorsport writer Doug Nye called the most powerful three-litre engine seen in Formula One at that time, with 548 bhp (409 kW). They tested their turbocharged V8 engine during practice for the Italian Grand Prix, but did not race with it until 1983. Most FOCA teams still relied upon the Cosworth DFV engine, which had been introduced by Lotus in 1967.

In 1981, McLaren had built the first monocoque car from carbon fibre composite. This resulted in lighter cars, while at the same time being more rigid. McLaren had proven that carbon-fibre cars could be quick, with John Watson winning the 1981 British Grand Prix. Watson's lack of severe injuries following a severe accident at that year's Italian Grand Prix had shown the superiority of the material in terms of safety. Lotus followed suit for 1982, introducing carbon fibre for their Lotus 91.

Even with these effective technical advances in chassis design, the FOCA teams with a Cosworth DFV motor had a significant power disadvantage compared to the constructors who used a turbocharged engine. To counteract this, the non-turbo teams used a loophole in the regulations. The weight of the car was measured before and after the race, with oil and cooling liquids allowed to be refilled before the final weigh-in. The teams would therefore build their cars lighter than allowed by the regulations and added water tanks, which they claimed were used to cool brake temperatures, but in reality the water was dumped on the track as soon as the car left the pitlane, allowing them to run faster. Keke Rosberg later explained that "the water tank [...] was the one that gave us at least a theoretical chance to compete with the turbos." In other regulation changes, the minimum weight of the cars was reduced from 585 kg (1,290 lb) to 580 kg (1,280 lb). A new "driver survival cell" cockpit protection was made mandatory as well.

Four companies, Goodyear, Michelin, Pirelli, and Avon, supplied tyres, including special qualifying tyres with an increased grip level. These qualifying tyres had originally been banned in 1980, but had since been reallowed. For the first time the number of tyres permitted for qualification was limited to two sets per session, creating a situation which Villeneuve thought "...unnecessarily dangerous. If I have only two chances to set a time, I need a clear track, OK? If it isn't clear, if there's someone in my way, I just have to hope he's looking in his mirrors – I mean, I can't lift, because this is my last chance." The necessity of having a clear track to make the most of the short-lasting qualifying tyres led to drivers taking risks, further increasing the danger.

== Season report ==
=== Pre-season ===
The week before the first Grand Prix weekend of the season in South Africa, teams gathered for a test session which was conducted at the Kyalami circuit. Prost set the fastest time during testing, at 1:05.71, almost eight seconds quicker than the previous track record. Surer, driving for the Arrows team, broke his feet in an accident and had to be replaced by Tambay. Mass also crashed in his March 821, but escaped uninjured. Ferrari did not have their new car, the 126C2, ready for testing and ran an updated version of their 1981 vehicle, the 126CK, instead. The Brabham team were satisfied with the progress of their new BT50 with the turbocharged BMW engine.

=== Championship ===
==== Opening rounds ====
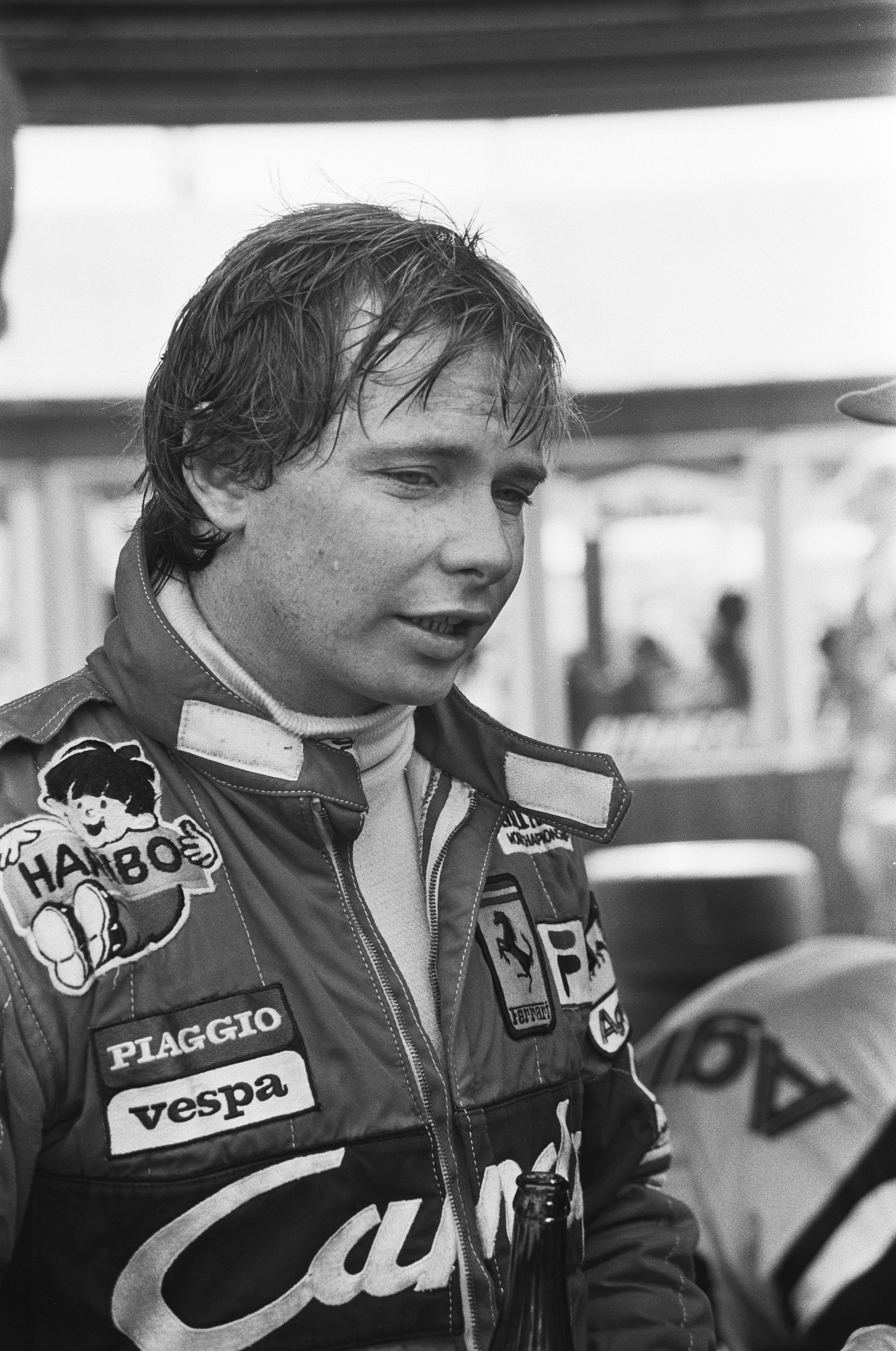
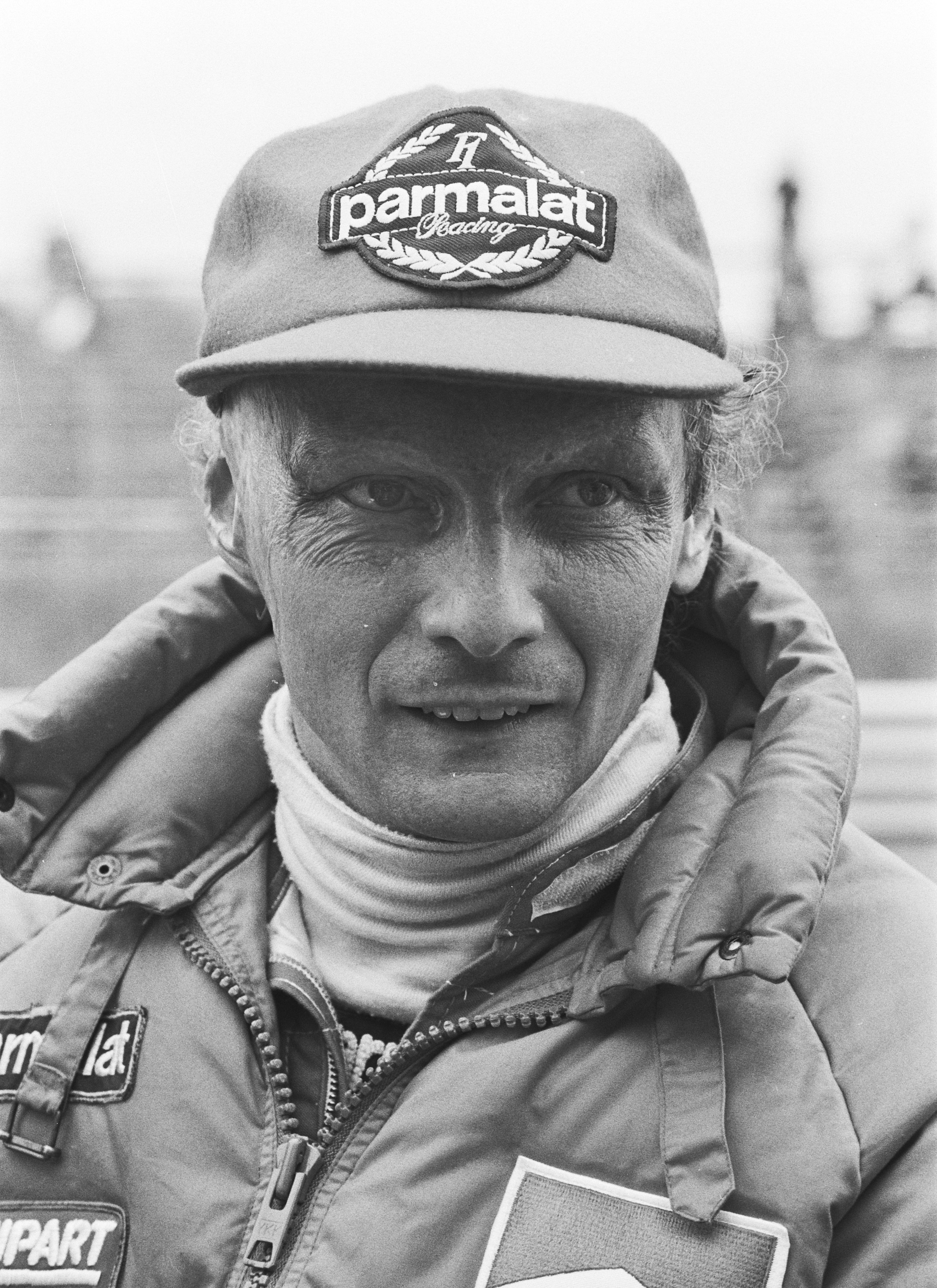
Didier Pironi (left) and Niki Lauda (right, both pictured at the 1982 Dutch Grand Prix) led a drivers' strike at the first race of the season.

Before the start of the season, all drivers had received a letter from FISA, containing an application form for a new Super Licence. This new document stated that drivers would not be allowed to switch teams freely during the course of the season, with their licence being withdrawn should they do so. Additionally, the document forbade drivers from actions "which might harm the moral or material interests" of Formula One. The returning Lauda was displeased by this and communicated with Pironi, head of the Grand Prix Drivers' Association (GPDA). They contacted other drivers and ultimately, six drivers refused to sign the document, those being Lauda, Pironi, Villeneuve, Arnoux, Bruno Giacomelli and Andrea de Cesaris.

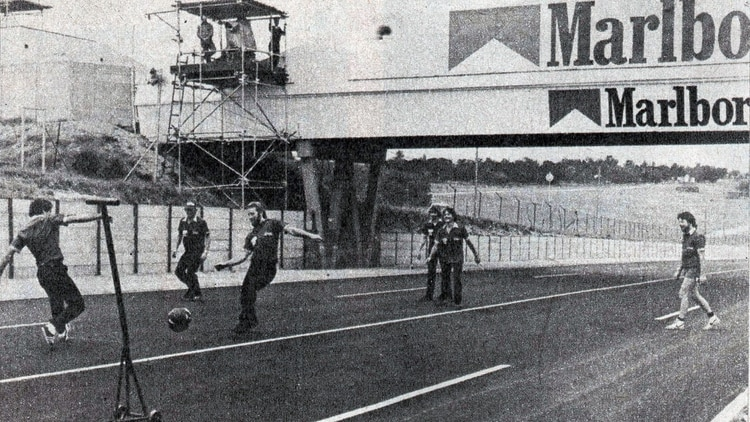
Mechanics play football on the main straight of Kyalami during the drivers' strike

On the Wednesday between testing and the first practice session of the South African Grand Prix, during a meeting of the Formula One Commission, (Note: The Formula One Commission is a group which discusses and votes upon changes to the sporting regulations of the sport. It consists of the teams, the FIA, race promoters and sponsor representatives.) Pironi, on behalf of the drivers, objected to the licence application. Balestre reacted strongly, excluding all drivers who had not signed from the following day's practice session. The drivers, almost all of them (Note: Jochen Mass did not partake in the strike and Teo Fabi left it midway due to pressure from his team.) and not just the ones who had refused to sign, in turn reacted by going on strike the next day, boarding a bus to a nearby hotel. The conflict continued until the next day, the Friday before the race was set to take place. It was partially resolved shortly before noon that day, with the drivers receiving half-hearted assurances towards their demands. They would ultimately be fined $5,000 each for the strike, with the new Super Licence being scrapped. Following the events in South Africa, the GPDA disbanded at a driver meeting in Paris, being replaced by the Professional Racing Drivers' Association (PRDA).

When qualifying finally commenced, Arnoux took pole position from Piquet, with Villeneuve and Patrese on the second row of the grid. At the start, Arnoux led while Piquet did not get away well and was overtaken by several cars, including Prost, who jumped from fifth to second. Piquet and Villeneuve retired early, while Prost took the lead from his teammate Arnoux on lap 14. He would lead until lap 41, when he punctured his left rear tyre, forcing him to come into the pitlane for new tyres. He emerged in eighth place, one lap behind the leader, but with this fresh set, Prost was the quickest driver on the course, allowing him to overtake relatively easily. On lap 68, he once again took the lead from Arnoux and went on to win the race. Reutemann also overtook Arnoux late in the race and finished second, with Lauda in fourth place on his return to Formula One racing.

The teams then travelled to Brazil for the second round. Brabham abandoned their turbo-charged BT50 for the time being on grounds of its unreliability, reverting to an updated BT49D for this race, powered by the Cosworth DFV engine. The cars once again proved just how quick they had become, when Prost qualified on pole position 6.27 seconds faster than Piquet had done the year before. Villeneuve was second on the grid and went into the lead at the start, followed by Rosberg, with the two Renault drivers behind. Rosberg fell behind the Renaults on the first lap and was overtaken by Patrese on lap three and by Piquet two laps later. Villeneuve led until lap 30, when he spun out. This allowed Piquet into the lead, closely followed by Rosberg, with the two having battled for position during the preceding laps. The order remained to the finish, with Piquet winning from Rosberg, Prost, Watson and Mansell.

The heavy strain posed onto the drivers by the bumpy circuit and hot, humid weather was showcased not only by Patrese retiring on lap 34 due to exhaustion, but also when Piquet fainted on the winners' rostrum. Following the race, both Ferrari and Renault protested the first- and second-place finishes of Piquet and Rosberg, citing the water tanks used by Brabham and Williams to be illegal. The case was taken to FISA in Paris, with no outcome until after the next race.

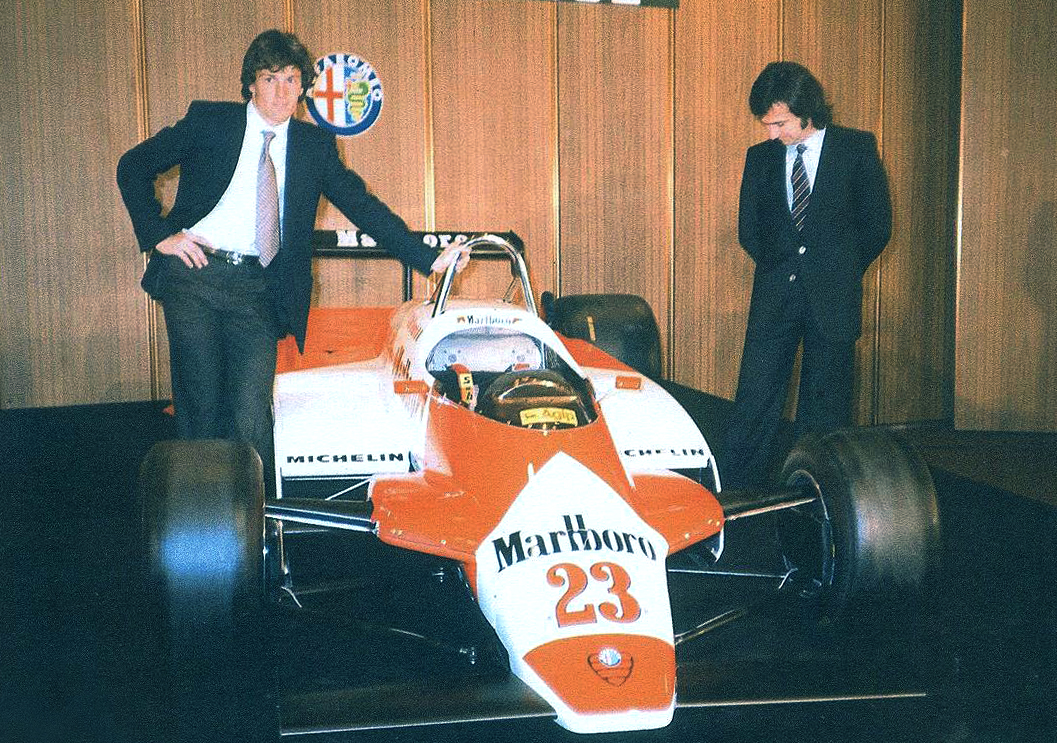
Andrea de Cesaris (left) took a surprise pole position at Long Beach in his Alfa Romeo 182 (pictured).

The third race of the season took place at the street circuit in Long Beach. During Saturday's qualifying, Lauda did just one run of a few laps, setting a fast time that put him on top of the leaderboard. In the closing seconds of the session, de Cesaris bettered Lauda's time, clinching pole position for Alfa Romeo. De Cesaris had been ousted by McLaren for Lauda over the winter and was moved to tears by his accomplishment.

De Cesaris led from the start, while Lauda was overtaken by Arnoux for second place. On lap six, Giacomelli, running fourth, tried to outbrake Lauda and in the process hit Arnoux, forcing both to retire. This allowed Villeneuve into third place, ahead of Watson. Pironi and Prost both retired after hitting the wall on laps seven and eleven respectively. On lap 15, Lauda took advantage of de Cesaris missing a gear change and moved into the lead, immediately beginning to pull away. Rosberg overtook Villeneuve for third on lap 21. This turned into second place on lap 34, when de Cesaris crashed into the wall after his engine had failed. The order remained until the chequered flag, with Lauda winning in only his third Grand Prix back in the sport. Villeneuve was later excluded from the results in Long Beach, following a protest by Ken Tyrrell over Ferrari's use of a double rear wing.

==== First European rounds ====
In the week before the next round, the San Marino Grand Prix, the FIA International Court of Appeal sided with Ferrari and Renault on their complaint over the water tanks at the race in Brazil and disqualified Piquet and Rosberg, handing victory to Prost. It was further decided that the cars would now be weighed after the race in the condition in which they had finished, eliminating the Cosworth-powered teams' use of water tanks to increase their performance. All other runners' results from the Brazilian Grand Prix were upheld, including Watson's, who inherited second place even though his use of the water tanks had been as illegal as the others. The FOCA teams requested a postponement of the next race until July to allow consideration of the effects of the court's judgement, on the grounds that it changed the regulations of the sport. The race organisers refused to delay the race, which went ahead without the majority of the FOCA teams. At this stage in the championship, Prost led with 18 points, six ahead of Lauda, with Rosberg and Watson sharing third position on eight points.

With the FOCA teams boycotting the race, the San Marino Grand Prix was run with just 14 cars present. (Note: The Tyrrell team, although a member of FOCA, attended the event. They were exempted from the boycott due to Italian sponsors providing much-needed money for the team.) The turbocharged Renaults and Ferraris were heavily favoured and Arnoux duly took pole position ahead of Prost, with Villeneuve and Pironi on the second row. Due to the fast nature of the Imola track, Ferrari team boss Mauro Forghieri told his drivers to save fuel. Arnoux led from the start while Prost lost two positions to the Ferrari drivers on the first lap. He eventually retired on lap seven. After some changes of position with Villeneuve and Pironi, Arnoux pulled away, but retired as well after 44 laps when his engine expired. This left only the Ferrari drivers in a position to win the Grand Prix. Their team held out "slow" signs from the pit wall, urging them to conserve fuel. Villeneuve, who led, understood this to mean that the cars were to finish in the current order. Pironi appeared to disregard the signals from the pitwall and took the lead on lap 46. He then sped up, pulling Villeneuve with him, who retook the lead again on lap 49. They changed position three more times; as Villeneuve slowed down each time he took the lead, Pironi would overtake him again. Eventually, Pironi won the race and Villeneuve was furious at his teammate for allegedly not following team orders. After the race, he said: "People seem to think we had the battle of our lives! [...] I was coasting those last 15 laps." Pironi said that "The 'slow' sign means only to use your head [... not that] if you think you can win, don't do it." In an interview the following week, Villeneuve said that he would never speak to Pironi again.

"I've declared war. Absolute war. Finishing second is one thing – I'd have been mad at myself for not being quick enough if he'd beaten me. But finishing second because the bastard steals it..."
Gilles Villeneuve describing his relationship with teammate Didier Pironi after the San Marino Grand Prix.

Two weeks later, the paddock moved to Zolder for the Belgian Grand Prix. In qualifying, Villeneuve went out onto the track on his second set of fast tyres, which were already used and had only one more fast lap to go before their performance became compromised. On his flying lap, he failed to better the time of teammate Pironi, but instead of slowing down, as drivers usually did on laps at the end of which they were supposed to head back to the pits, Villeneuve continued to drive fast. It has been speculated that he was determined to beat Pironi's time due to the animosity between the two. It is unclear if this is true, with Forghieri claiming that Villeneuve had indeed planned to return to the pitlane. In any event, Villeneuve caught Jochen Mass travelling much more slowly through a left-handed bend and moved to the right to pass him at the same instant that Mass also moved right to let Villeneuve through on the racing line. The two collided and Villeneuve was thrown out of his disintegrating car. He died of a fractured neck in a local hospital at 9:12 that evening.

Ferrari withdrew from the race, which Watson won for McLaren. His teammate Lauda, who had finished third behind Rosberg, was disqualified after the race for an underweight car. The results were dominated by the returning FOCA teams; even the only turbo-engined finisher, Piquet, was one of them, after Brabham reintroduced the BMW-powered BT50 for this race.

Motorsport journalist Nigel Roebuck stated that the next race, the Monaco Grand Prix, "was a sombre, edgy place [...] the sense of [Villeneuve's] absence was overwhelming"; the Canadian had lived in the principality and had won the previous year's race. Ferrari chose to only run one car, not replacing Villeneuve for the time being. In the race itself, Arnoux led early on from pole position before spinning off, handing the lead to his Renault teammate Prost. The latter in turn built up a massive lead, but a light rain shower in the closing laps triggered a chaotic finish. Prost crashed out, handing the lead to Patrese, still running the Cosworth-powered Brabham BT49D. Patrese spun on the penultimate lap and stalled, allowing Pironi into the lead, followed by de Cesaris. On the final lap, Pironi, de Cesaris, and Daly all retired because they ran out of fuel while in potential race winning positions. Meanwhile, Patrese bump-started his car by coasting down a hill, completed the final two laps, and took his first career victory. Pironi was classified second, despite running out of fuel and stopping on the last lap. After the race, Prost, who had scored no points since the Brazilian Grand Prix in March, led the championship by one point from Watson and two points from Pironi.

==== North American rounds ====
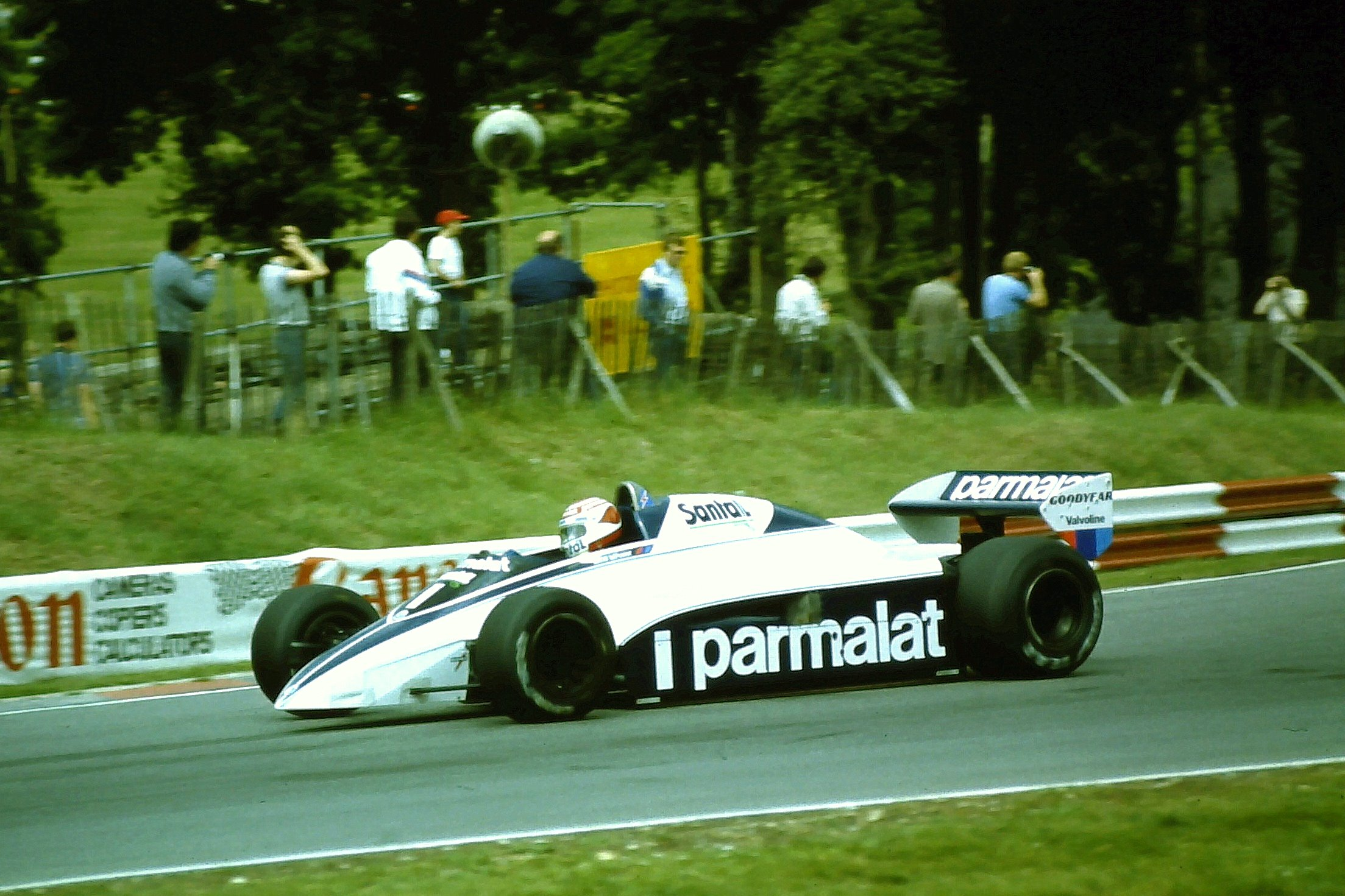
Defending champion Nelson Piquet (pictured at the British Grand Prix), failed to qualify in Detroit, but won the next race in Canada.

The next race was the inaugural Detroit Grand Prix, which was marred by lack of track preparation, delaying the practice session on a circuit that had never hosted a motor race before. During the shortened qualifying session, Prost took pole position ahead of de Cesaris, with Rosberg in third. The big surprise of the day was defending World Champion Piquet, who failed to qualify as his Brabham BT50 had engine problems and the spare car was not performing well either. In the race, Prost led comfortably until an accident between Roberto Guerrero, Elio de Angelis and Patrese led to the race being suspended. De Cesaris had retired at this point and at the restart, Prost led Rosberg and Pironi. A problem with the fuel injection slowed Prost down, handing the lead to Rosberg. Watson, who qualified 17th on the grid, got his Michelin tyres working well on the Detroit circuit and overtook one driver after another until, on lap 37, he went into the lead, as Rosberg had gearbox issues. Watson won the race from Eddie Cheever and Pironi, taking the lead in the World Championship.

Tragedy struck again at the Canadian Grand Prix. Pironi qualified on pole, but stalled at the start. His stationary car was hit by the Osella of young Italian Riccardo Paletti, who was competing in only his second race in Formula One. Paletti suffered severe internal injuries and his car caught fire while the track marshals tried to extract him from his vehicle. He was pronounced dead upon arrival in the hospital. The race was restarted and won by Piquet in the BMW-powered Brabham ahead of teammate Patrese, still in the Cosworth-powered BT49D. It would be the last one-two finish for the Brabham team in their Formula One history. Watson finished third to consolidate his lead in the championship. After the Canadian round, Watson was on 30 points, ten ahead of Pironi, followed by Patrese on 19, Prost with 18 and Rosberg with 17 points.

==== Back to Europe ====
At the Dutch Grand Prix, Ferrari introduced Patrick Tambay as a replacement for Villeneuve. The Renault drivers once more locked out the front row, Arnoux ahead of Prost. The latter took the lead at the start, followed by Arnoux and Pironi. On lap two, Pironi overtook Arnoux and three laps later moved ahead of Prost into the lead. While Prost retired with an engine failure, Arnoux was lucky to survive a heavy accident on lap 22 at Tarzan corner. His left front wheel broke off as he approached the corner, sending his car into the tyre wall. Pironi won the race without serious competition, ahead of Piquet and Rosberg.

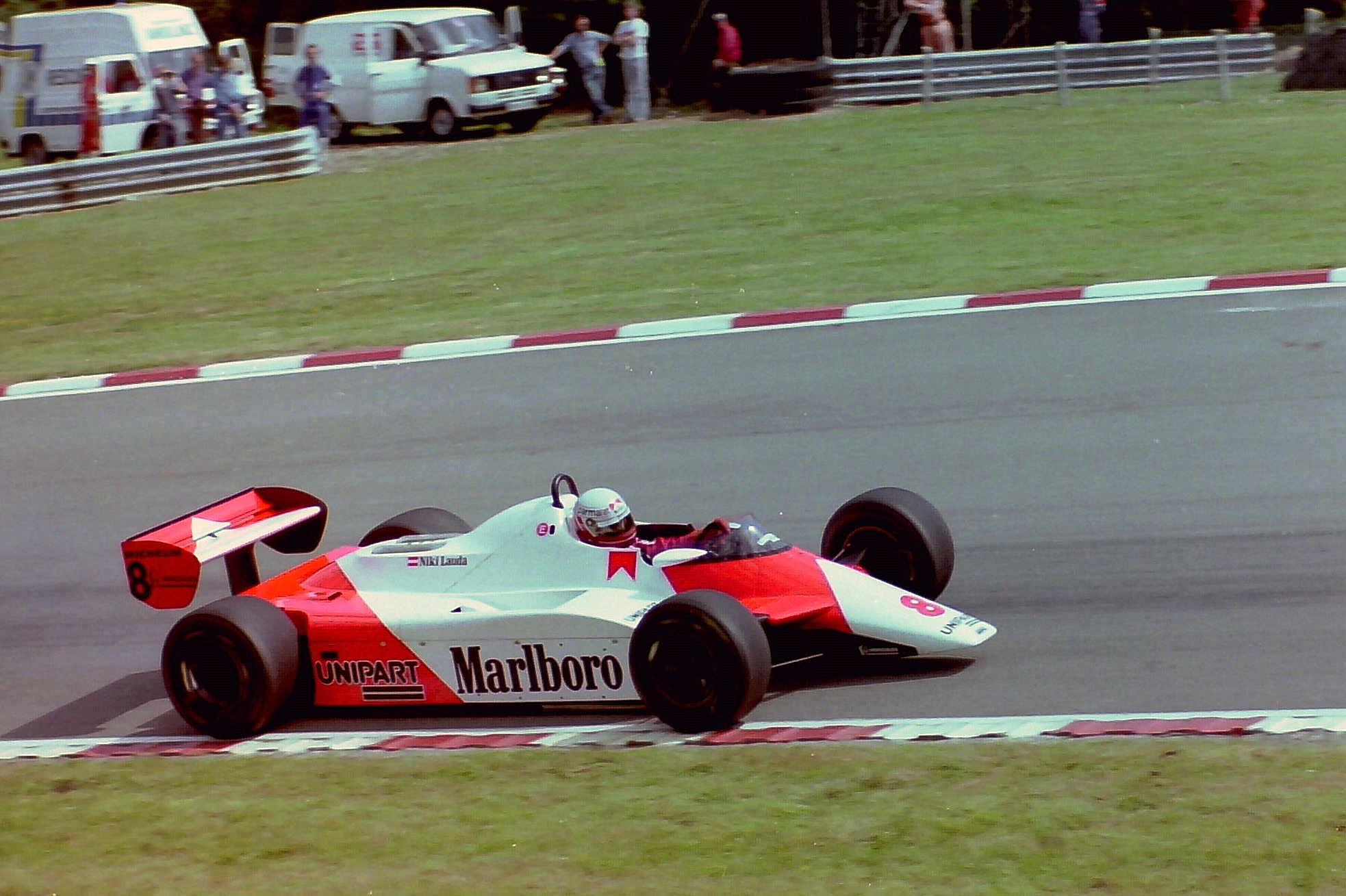
Niki Lauda won two races in his comeback season, first in Long Beach, then in the United Kingdom (pictured).

For the next race at Brands Hatch, the British Grand Prix, Brabham had devised what they referred to as "The Ploy". Inspired by Prost's comeback drive at the season opener at Kyalami, the team planned to send out their cars with tanks only half full and softer, and therefore faster, tyres. A pit stop midway through the race was supposed to refuel the car and change tyres, giving the Brabham drivers the advantage to be able to lap quicker than everybody else and gain enough of a lead to win. On top of that, both drivers were now committed to the BMW-powered BT50 chassis.

In qualifying, Rosberg surprised by taking only the second, and last, non-turbocharged pole position of the season. At the start of the warm-up lap, a fuel pressure issue led to his car being stationary on the grid while the other cars got underway. His mechanics helped him to a push start, but he did not reach the field in time and had to start the race last. This handed the front starting spot to Patrese, but he stalled. Both Arnoux and Fabi ran into him, taking all three out on the spot. Piquet as the only remaining Brabham left led from Lauda, but "The Ploy" was not to be executed, as Piquet retired with fuel injection problems on lap ten. This left Lauda to take his second victory of the season, followed by Pironi and Tambay. Pironi took over the lead of the championship, now five points ahead of Watson.

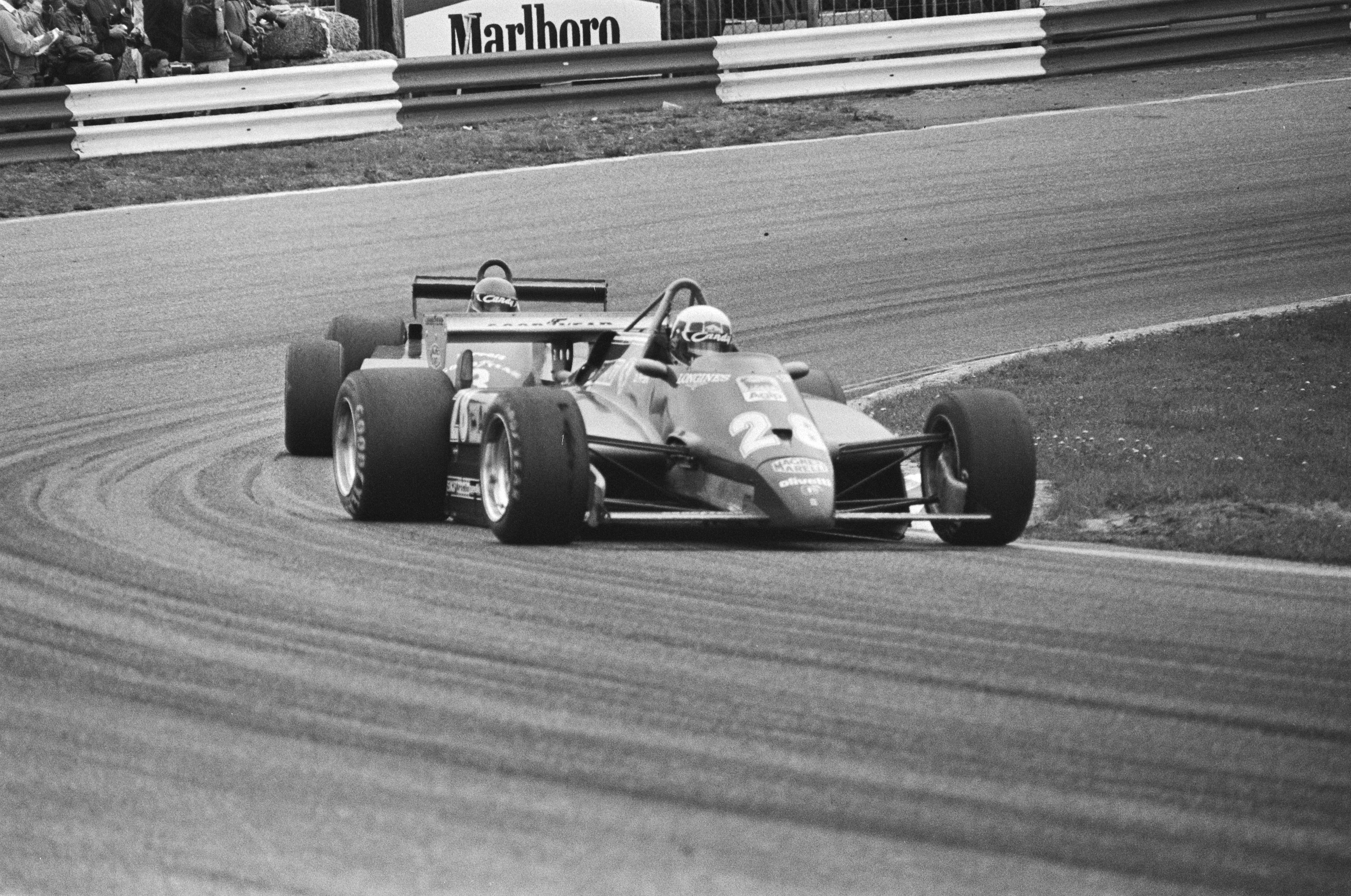
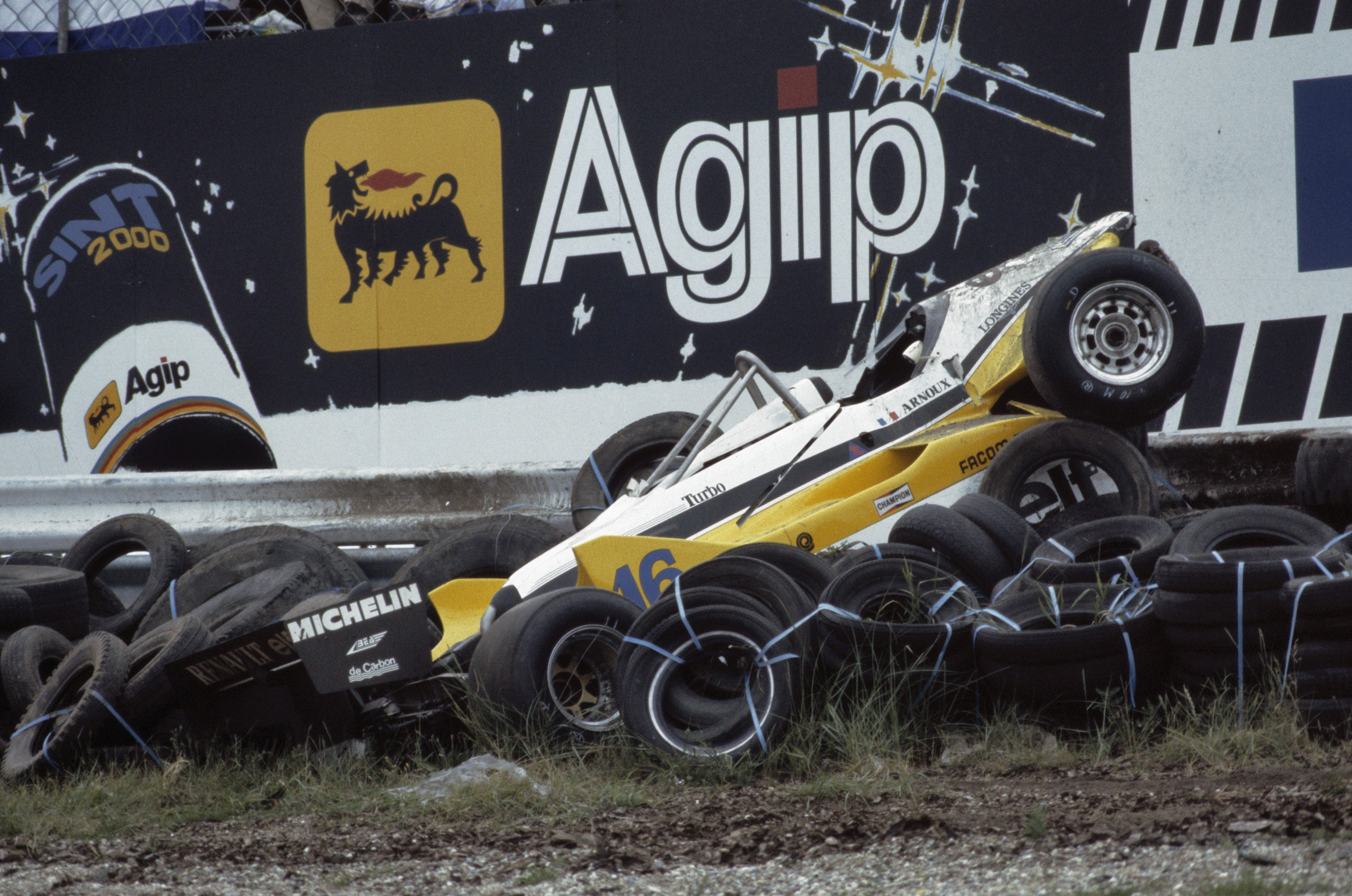
Didier Pironi (top) won the Dutch Grand Prix for Ferrari, while René Arnoux survived a heavy accident (bottom).

The Renaults were dominant at their home race, the French Grand Prix at Circuit Paul Ricard. Arnoux qualified ahead of Prost, and with Prost being better positioned in the championship, the team decided that if the cars should run first and second, he should win. Arnoux did not honour the agreement and took the victory ahead of his teammate, much to Prost's dismay. Another heavy accident marred the race, as Mass ran into the back of Mauro Baldi at Signes corner. As Mass's car slid towards the barrier, it was catapulted into the grandstands full of spectators. Although several people had minor injures, the accident did not result in any fatalities or serious injuries. At this stage, Pironi led the championship by nine points ahead of Watson and was seen as the likely favourite to win the title.

At the following event, the German Grand Prix at Hockenheim, Pironi qualified on pole position, but collided with Prost's Renault in wet conditions later in the session. Pironi's car was thrown into the air and though he survived the impact, he suffered severe leg injuries and would never compete in Formula One again. The race took place with the first slot on the grid vacant. Brabham were again attempting to employ the strategy of having their cars refuel and change tyres halfway through the race. Piquet led comfortably when he collided with Salazar while trying to lap him, leading Piquet to furiously hit and kick his competitor after he got out of the car. Tambay went on to win the race for Ferrari, his first victory in a Grand Prix, ahead of Arnoux and Rosberg, who was now third in the championship.

At the Austrian Grand Prix on the Österreichring, most turbocharged runners retired early, leaving Prost in the lead, only to retire with fuel injection issues five laps from the finish. This left de Angelis and Rosberg to fight out the race victory, with de Angelis reaching the finish line 0.050 seconds ahead to win his first ever Grand Prix. The Grand Prix also saw the Brabham drivers make it to their mid-race pit stops for the first time, only for both to retire later on.

Rosberg in turn achieved his maiden victory at the next race, the Swiss Grand Prix, held at the Dijon-Prenois circuit and scheduled for 80 laps. By now, several other teams planned and executed fuel-and-tyres pit stops, with varying degrees of success. The Renaults of Prost and Arnoux had qualified on the front row. Rosberg, consistently lapping quicker than all other drivers, was held up by de Cesaris, but eventually found a way past him. He overtook Arnoux on lap 73 and Prost on lap 78 to take the lead and the race victory. In doing so, he also took the lead in the championship.

At the Italian Grand Prix, Mario Andretti returned to take over the seat at Ferrari left vacant by Pironi and qualified in pole position. The race was won by Arnoux, leading home the Ferraris of Tambay and Andretti. Rosberg did not score points, having finished eighth. Watson meanwhile took three points for fourth place, leaving him with a mathematical chance of winning the title; this would require him to win the last race of the season with Rosberg failing to score.

==== Last round and title decision ====
"To be honest, I've hated every second of this season. There's something very wrong when the chequered flag comes down, and all you feel is relief that another race weekend is out of the way without someone getting killed."
FISA circuit inspector Derek Ongaro speaking about the 1982 season.

At the last race of the season, the Caesars Palace Grand Prix in Las Vegas, Prost took pole position ahead of Arnoux. The race was held in 37.1 °C (98.8 °F) degree weather during a particularly hot time of year in Las Vegas. While Arnoux retired from the race itself, Prost was hampered by blistering tyres to finish fourth. Michele Alboreto took a surprising victory for Tyrrell. Watson finished second, meaning that Rosberg's fifth-place finish was enough to secure the title. He became the first driver since Mike Hawthorn in 1958 to clinch the championship having won just one Grand Prix.

=== Post-season ===
The 1982 season was the last for Lotus team owner Colin Chapman, who died on 16 December 1982 having suffered a heart attack. Following "a season touched by tragedy, clouded in controversy and enveloped in excitement", FISA announced that the "ground effect" would be banned for 1983 to make the cars safer. Overall, the 1982 season saw 11 different winners in 16 races, with no driver scoring more than two victories. This included nine different winners in the same number of consecutive races. Five drivers scored their first ever Grand Prix victory: Patrese, Tambay, de Angelis, Rosberg, and Alboreto.

== Results and standings ==
=== Grands Prix ===
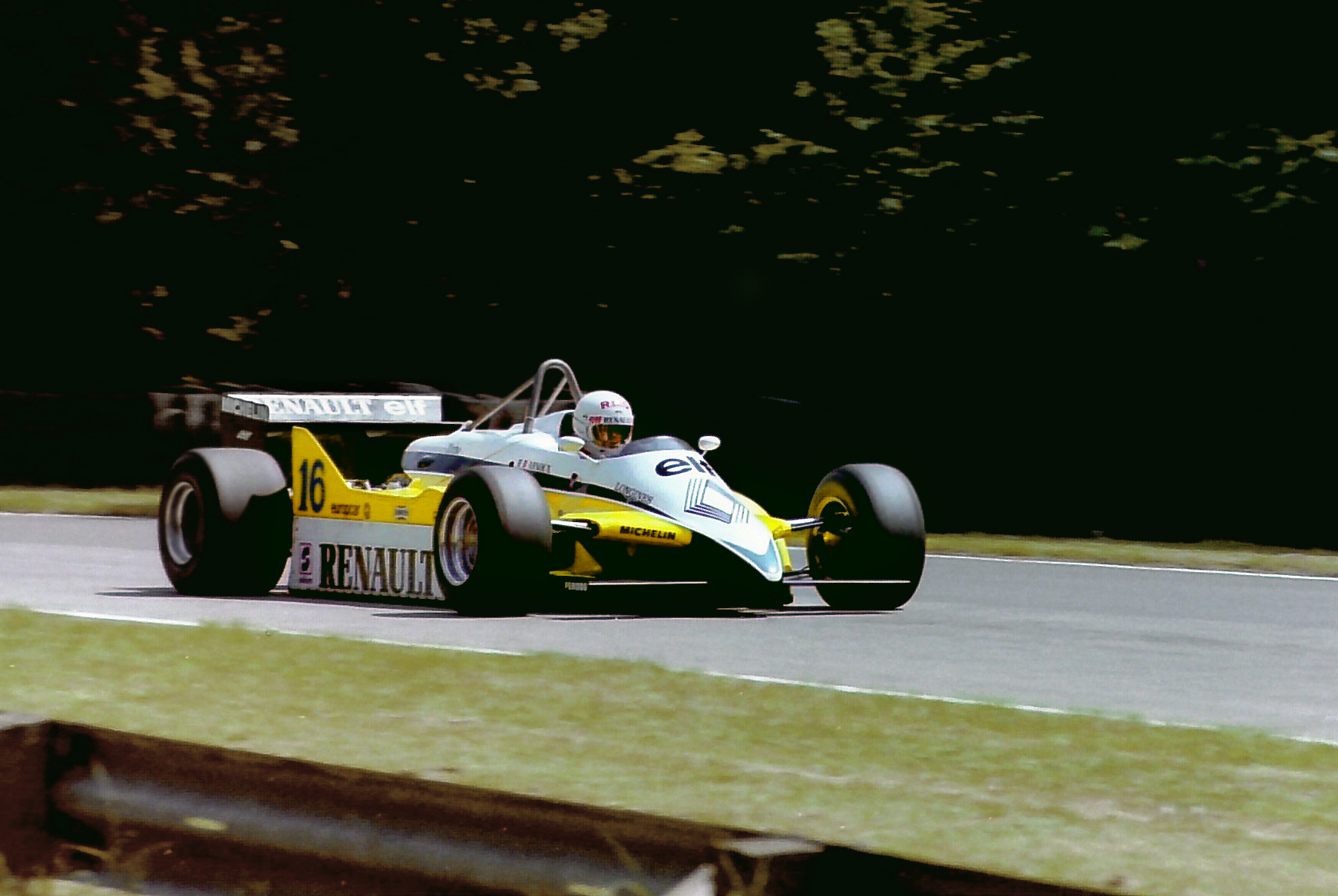
Renault was dominant in qualifying, taking 10 out of 16 pole positions, but finished only third in the Constructors' Championship due to poor reliability of their RE30B (pictured).

Round	Race	Pole Position	Fastest Lap	Winning driver	Constructor	Report
1	(South Africa) South African Grand Prix	(France) René Arnoux	(France) Alain Prost	(France) Alain Prost	(France) Renault	Report
2	(Brazil) Brazilian Grand Prix	(France) Alain Prost	(France) Alain Prost	(France) Alain Prost (Note: Nelson Piquet and Keke Rosberg originally finished first and second, but were both disqualified due to an underweight car. Alain Prost, initially classified third, inherited the win.)	(France) Renault	Report
3	United States Grand Prix West	(Italy) Andrea de Cesaris	(Austria) Niki Lauda	(Austria) Niki Lauda	(United Kingdom) McLaren-Ford	Report
4	(Italy) San Marino Grand Prix	(France) René Arnoux	(France) Didier Pironi	(France) Didier Pironi	(Italy) Ferrari	Report
5	(Belgium) Belgian Grand Prix	(France) Alain Prost	(United Kingdom) John Watson	(United Kingdom) John Watson	(United Kingdom) McLaren-Ford	Report
6	Monaco Grand Prix	(France) René Arnoux	(Italy) Riccardo Patrese	(Italy) Riccardo Patrese	(United Kingdom) Brabham-Ford	Report
7	(United States) Detroit Grand Prix	(France) Alain Prost	(France) Alain Prost	(United Kingdom) John Watson	(United Kingdom) McLaren-Ford	Report
8	(Canada) Canadian Grand Prix	(France) Didier Pironi	(France) Didier Pironi	(Brazil) Nelson Piquet	(United Kingdom) Brabham-BMW	Report
9	(Netherlands) Dutch Grand Prix	(France) René Arnoux	(United Kingdom) Derek Warwick	(France) Didier Pironi	(Italy) Ferrari	Report
10	(United Kingdom) British Grand Prix	(Finland) Keke Rosberg	(United Kingdom) Brian Henton	(Austria) Niki Lauda	(United Kingdom) McLaren-Ford	Report
11	(France) French Grand Prix	(France) René Arnoux	(Italy) Riccardo Patrese	(France) René Arnoux	(France) Renault	Report
12	(West Germany) German Grand Prix	(France) Didier Pironi (Note: Didier Pironi set the fastest time in qualifying, but did not start the race after an accident during practice. Pole position was left vacant on the grid, but Pironi is still considered to have held pole position.)	(Brazil) Nelson Piquet	(France) Patrick Tambay	(Italy) Ferrari	Report
13	(Austria) Austrian Grand Prix	(Brazil) Nelson Piquet	(Brazil) Nelson Piquet	(Italy) Elio de Angelis	(United Kingdom) Lotus-Ford	Report
14	(France) Swiss Grand Prix	(France) Alain Prost	(France) Alain Prost	(Finland) Keke Rosberg	(United Kingdom) Williams-Ford	Report
15	(Italy) Italian Grand Prix	(United States) Mario Andretti	(France) René Arnoux	(France) René Arnoux	(France) Renault	Report
16	(United States) Caesars Palace Grand Prix	(France) Alain Prost	(Italy) Michele Alboreto	(Italy) Michele Alboreto	(United Kingdom) Tyrrell-Ford	Report

=== Scoring system ===
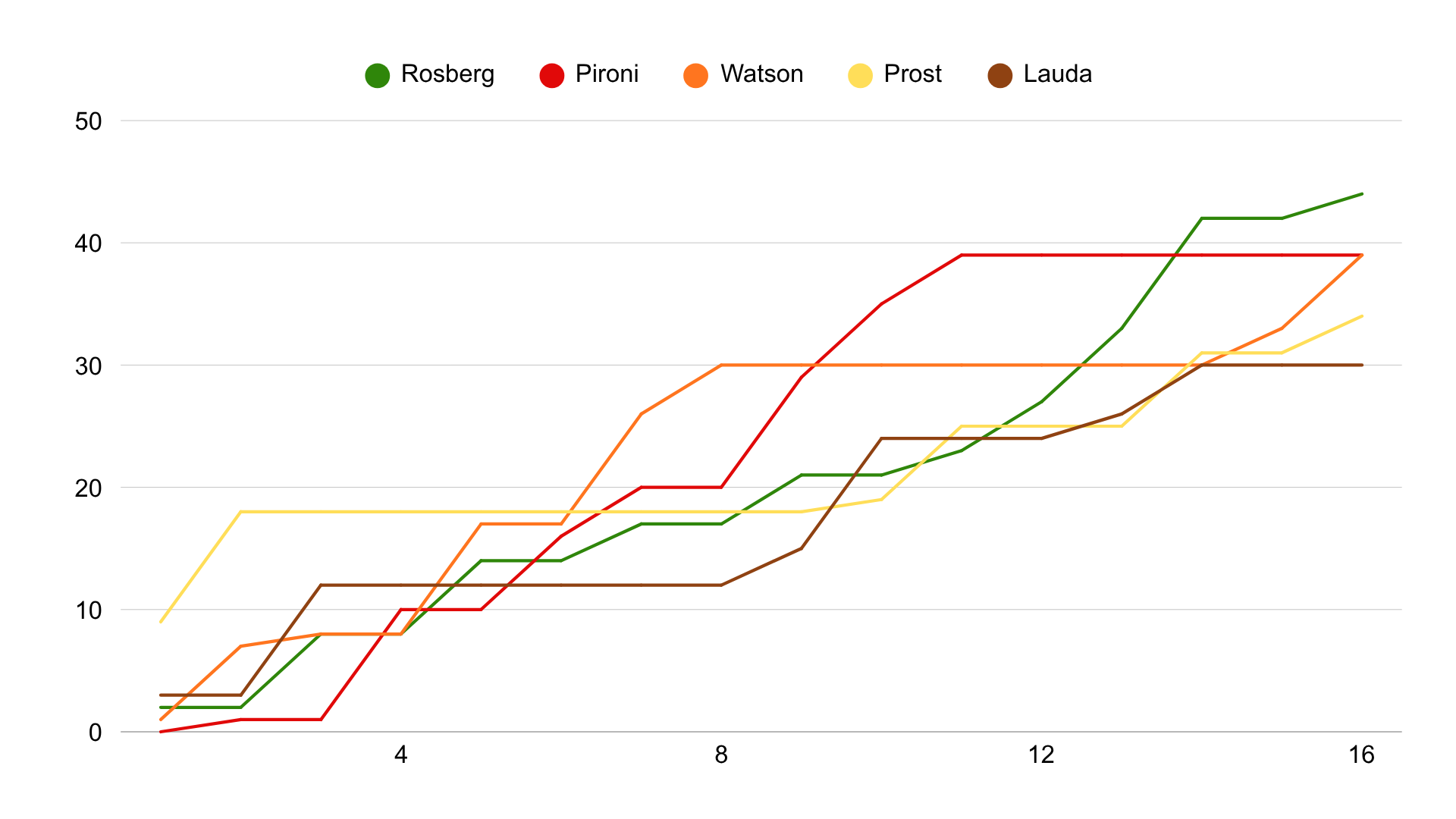
Cumulative points of the top five drivers

Points were awarded to the top six classified finishers. For the Drivers' Championship, the best eleven results were counted, while, for the Constructors' Championship, all rounds were counted.

No driver classified in more than eleven points-scoring positions, so no drop-rounds applied for this season. Points were awarded in the following system:

Position	1st	2nd	3rd	4th	5th	6th
Race	9	6	4	3	2	1

=== World Drivers' Championship standings ===
Pos	Driver	RSA (South Africa)	BRA (Brazil)	USW (United States)	SMR (Italy)	BEL (Belgium)	MON (Monaco)	DET (United States)	CAN (Canada)	NED (Netherlands)	GBR (United Kingdom)	FRA (France)	GER (West Germany)	AUT (Austria)	SUI (France)	ITA (Italy)	CPL (United States)	Points
1	(Finland) Keke Rosberg	5	DSQ	2		2	Ret	4	Ret	3	Ret^{P}	5	3	2	1	8	5	44
2	(France) Didier Pironi	18	6	Ret	1^{F}	DNS	2	3	9^{P}^{F}	1	2	3	DNS^{P}					39
3	(United Kingdom) John Watson	6	2	6		1^{F}	Ret	1	3	9	Ret	Ret	Ret	Ret	13	4	2	39
4	(France) Alain Prost	1^{F}	1^{P}^{F}	Ret	Ret	Ret^{P}	7	NC^{P}^{F}	Ret	Ret	6	2	Ret	8	2^{P}^{F}	Ret	4^{P}	34
5	(Austria) Niki Lauda	4	Ret	1^{F}		DSQ	Ret	Ret	Ret	4	1	8	DNS	5	3	Ret	Ret	30
6	(France) René Arnoux	3^{P}	Ret	Ret	Ret^{P}	Ret	Ret^{P}	10	Ret	Ret^{P}	Ret	1^{P}	2	Ret	16	1^{F}	Ret	28
7	(France) Patrick Tambay									8	3	4	1	4	DNS	2	DNS	25
8	(Italy) Michele Alboreto	7	4	4	3	Ret	10	Ret	Ret	7	Ret	6	4	Ret	7	5	1^{F}	25
9	(Italy) Elio de Angelis	8	Ret	5		4	5	Ret	4	Ret	4	Ret	Ret	1	6	Ret	Ret	23
10	(Italy) Riccardo Patrese	Ret	Ret	3		Ret	1^{F}	Ret	2	15	Ret	Ret^{F}	Ret	Ret	5	Ret	Ret	21
11	(Brazil) Nelson Piquet	Ret	DSQ	Ret		5	Ret	DNQ	1	2	Ret	Ret	Ret^{F}	Ret^{P}^{F}	4	Ret	Ret	20
12	(United States) Eddie Cheever	Ret	Ret	Ret		3	Ret	2	10	DNQ	Ret	16	Ret	Ret	Ret	6	3	15
13	(Republic of Ireland) Derek Daly	14	Ret	Ret		Ret	6	5	7	5	5	7	Ret	Ret	9	Ret	6	8
14	(United Kingdom) Nigel Mansell	Ret	3	7		Ret	4	Ret	Ret		Ret		9	Ret	8	7	Ret	7
15	(Argentina) Carlos Reutemann	2	Ret															6
=	(Canada) Gilles Villeneuve	Ret	Ret	DSQ	2	DNS†												6
17	(Italy) Andrea de Cesaris	13	Ret	Ret^{P}	Ret	Ret	3	Ret	6	Ret	Ret	Ret	Ret	Ret	10	10	9	5
18	(France) Jacques Laffite	Ret	Ret	Ret		9	Ret	6	Ret	Ret	Ret	14	Ret	3	Ret	Ret	Ret	5
19	(United States) Mario Andretti			Ret												3^{P}	Ret	4
20	(France) Jean-Pierre Jarier	Ret	9	Ret	4	Ret	DNQ	Ret	Ret	14	Ret	Ret	Ret	DNQ	Ret	Ret	DNS	3
21	(Switzerland) Marc Surer					7	9	8	5	10	Ret	13	6	Ret	15	Ret	7	3
22	(Italy) Bruno Giacomelli	11	Ret	Ret	Ret	Ret	Ret	Ret	Ret	11	7	9	5	Ret	12	Ret	10	2
23	(Chile) Eliseo Salazar	9	Ret	Ret	5	Ret	Ret	Ret	Ret	13	DNQ	Ret	Ret	DNQ	14	9	DNQ	2
24	(West Germany) Manfred Winkelhock	10	5	Ret	DSQ	Ret	Ret	Ret	DNQ	12	DNQ	11	Ret	Ret	Ret	DNQ	NC	2
25	(Italy) Mauro Baldi	DNQ	10	DNQ		Ret	DNQ	Ret	8	6	9	Ret	Ret	6	DNQ	12	11	2
26	(Brazil) Chico Serra	17	Ret	DNQ		6	DNPQ	11	DNQ	Ret	Ret	DNQ	11	7	DNQ	11	DNQ	1
—	(United Kingdom) Brian Henton	DNQ	DNQ	Ret	Ret	Ret	8	9	NC	Ret	8^{F}	10	7	Ret	11	Ret	8	0
—	(West Germany) Jochen Mass	12	8	8		Ret	DNQ	7	11	Ret	10	Ret						0
—	(Sweden) Slim Borgudd	16	7	10														0
—	(Brazil) Raul Boesel	15	Ret	9		8	DNPQ	Ret	Ret	Ret	DNQ	DNQ	Ret	DNQ	Ret	DNQ	13	0
—	(Colombia) Roberto Guerrero	WD	DNQ	Ret		DNQ	DNQ	Ret	Ret	DNQ	Ret	DNQ	8	Ret	Ret	NC	DNS	0
—	(United Kingdom) Derek Warwick	Ret	DNQ	DNPQ	Ret	Ret	DNQ			Ret^{F}	Ret	15	10	Ret	Ret	Ret	Ret	0
—	(United Kingdom) Rupert Keegan												DNQ	Ret	Ret	DNQ	12	0
—	(United Kingdom) Geoff Lees								Ret			12						0
—	(Italy) Teo Fabi	DNQ	DNQ	DNQ	NC	Ret	DNPQ			DNQ	Ret	Ret	DNQ	Ret	Ret	Ret	DNQ	0
—	(Italy) Riccardo Paletti	DNQ	DNPQ	DNQ	Ret	DNPQ	DNPQ	DNS	Ret†									0
—	(Republic of Ireland) Tommy Byrne												DNQ	Ret	DNQ	DNQ	Ret	0
—	(Netherlands) Jan Lammers					DNQ	DNQ	DNQ		Ret	DNQ	DNQ						0
—	(Spain) Emilio de Villota					DNPQ	DNPQ	DNQ	DNQ	DNPQ								0
—	(Brazil) Roberto Moreno									DNQ								0
Pos	Driver	RSA (South Africa)	BRA (Brazil)	USW (United States)	SMR (Italy)	BEL (Belgium)	MON (Monaco)	DET (United States)	CAN (Canada)	NED (Netherlands)	GBR (United Kingdom)	FRA (France)	GER (West Germany)	AUT (Austria)	SUI (France)	ITA (Italy)	CPL (United States)	Points

Key
Colour	Result
Gold	Winner
Silver	Second place
Bronze	Third place
Green	Other points position
Blue	Other classified position
Blue	Not classified, finished (NC)
Purple	Not classified, retired (Ret)
Red	Did not qualify (DNQ)
Red	Did not pre-qualify (DNPQ)
Black	Disqualified (DSQ)
White	Did not start (DNS)
White	Race cancelled (C)
Blank	Did not practice (DNP)
Blank	Excluded (EX)
Blank	Did not arrive (DNA)
Blank	Withdrawn (WD)
Blank	Did not enter (cell empty)
Text formatting	Meaning
**Bold**	Pole position
Italics	Fastest lap

=== World Constructors' Championship standings ===
Pos	Constructor	RSA (South Africa)	BRA (Brazil)	USW (United States)	SMR (Italy)	BEL (Belgium)	MON (Monaco)	DET (United States)	CAN (Canada)	NED (Netherlands)	GBR (United Kingdom)	FRA (France)	GER (West Germany)	AUT (Austria)	SUI (France)	ITA (Italy)	CPL (United States)	Points
1	(Italy) Ferrari	Ret	Ret	DSQ	2	DNS				8	3	4	1	4	DNS	2	DNS	74
1	(Italy) Ferrari	18	6	Ret	1^{F}	DNS	2	3	9^{PF}	1	2	3	DNS^{P}			3^{P}	Ret	74
2	(United Kingdom) McLaren-Ford	6	2	6		1^{F}	Ret	1	3	9	Ret	Ret	Ret	9	13	4	2	69
2	(United Kingdom) McLaren-Ford	4	Ret	1^{F}		DSQ	Ret	Ret	Ret	4	1	8	DNS	5	3	Ret	Ret	69
3	(France) Renault	1^{F}	1^{PF}	Ret	Ret	Ret^{P}	7	NC^{PF}	Ret	Ret	6	2	Ret	8	2^{PF}	Ret	4^{P}	62
3	(France) Renault	3^{P}	Ret	Ret	Ret^{P}	Ret	Ret^{P}	10	Ret	Ret^{P}	Ret	1^{P}	2	Ret	16	1^{F}	Ret	62
4	(United Kingdom) Williams-Ford	2	Ret	Ret		Ret	6	5	7	5	5	7	Ret	Ret	9	Ret	6	58
4	(United Kingdom) Williams-Ford	5	DSQ	2		2	Ret	4	Ret	3	Ret^{P}	5	3	2	1	8	5	58
5	(United Kingdom) Lotus-Ford	8	Ret	5		4	5	Ret	4	Ret	4	Ret	Ret	1	6	Ret	Ret	30
5	(United Kingdom) Lotus-Ford	Ret	3	7		Ret	4	Ret	Ret	DNQ	Ret	12	9	Ret	8	7	Ret	30
6	(United Kingdom) Tyrrell-Ford	7	4	4	3	Ret	10	Ret	Ret	7	Ret	6	4	Ret	7	5	1^{F}	25
6	(United Kingdom) Tyrrell-Ford	16	7	10	Ret	Ret	8	9	NC	Ret	8^{F}	10	7	Ret	11	Ret	8	25
7	(United Kingdom) Brabham-BMW	Ret				5	Ret	DNQ	1	2	Ret	Ret	Ret^{F}	Ret^{PF}	4	Ret	Ret	22
7	(United Kingdom) Brabham-BMW	Ret				Ret				15	Ret	Ret^{F}	Ret	Ret	5	Ret	Ret	22
8	(France) Talbot Ligier-Matra	Ret	Ret	Ret		3	Ret	2	10	DNQ	Ret	16	Ret	Ret	Ret	6	3	20
8	(France) Talbot Ligier-Matra	Ret	Ret	Ret		9	Ret	6	Ret	Ret	Ret	14	Ret	3	Ret	Ret	Ret	20
9	(United Kingdom) Brabham-Ford		DSQ	Ret														19
9	(United Kingdom) Brabham-Ford		Ret	3			1^{F}	Ret	2									19
10	(Italy) Alfa Romeo	13	Ret	Ret^{P}	Ret	Ret	3	Ret	6	Ret	Ret	Ret	Ret	Ret	10	10	9	7
10	(Italy) Alfa Romeo	11	Ret	Ret	Ret	Ret	Ret	Ret	Ret	11	7	9	5	Ret	12	Ret	10	7
11	(United Kingdom) Arrows-Ford	DNQ	DNQ	Ret		7	9	8	5	10	Ret	13	6	Ret	15	Ret	7	5
11	(United Kingdom) Arrows-Ford	DNQ	10	DNQ		Ret	DNQ	Ret	8	6	9	Ret	Ret	6	DNQ	12	11	5
12	(West Germany) ATS-Ford	10	5	Ret	DSQ	Ret	Ret	Ret	DNQ	12	DNQ	11	Ret	Ret	Ret	DNQ	NC	4
12	(West Germany) ATS-Ford	9	Ret	Ret	5	Ret	Ret	Ret	Ret	13	DNQ	Ret	Ret	DNQ	14	9	DNQ	4
13	(Italy) Osella-Ford	Ret	9	Ret	4	Ret	DNQ	Ret	Ret	14	Ret	Ret	Ret	DNQ	Ret	Ret	DNS	3
13	(Italy) Osella-Ford	DNQ	DNPQ	DNQ	Ret	DNPQ	DNPQ	DNS	Ret									3
14	(Brazil) Fittipaldi-Ford	17	Ret	DNQ		6	DNPQ	11	DNQ	Ret	Ret	DNQ	11	7	DNQ	11	DNQ	1
—	(United Kingdom) March-Ford	12	8	8		Ret	DNQ	7	11	Ret	10	Ret	DNQ	Ret	Ret	DNQ	12	0
—	(United Kingdom) March-Ford	15	Ret	9		8	DNPQ	Ret	Ret	Ret	DNQ	DNQ	Ret	DNQ	Ret	DNQ	13	0
—	(United Kingdom) March-Ford					DNPQ	DNPQ	DNQ	DNQ	DNPQ								0
—	(United Kingdom) Ensign-Ford	WD	DNQ	Ret		DNQ	DNQ	Ret	Ret	DNQ	Ret	DNQ	8	Ret	Ret	NC	DNS	0
—	(United Kingdom) Toleman-Hart	Ret	DNQ	DNPQ	Ret	Ret	DNQ			Ret^{F}	Ret	15	10	Ret	Ret	Ret	Ret	0
—	(United Kingdom) Toleman-Hart	DNQ	DNQ	DNQ	NC	Ret	DNPQ			DNQ	Ret	Ret	DNQ	Ret	Ret	Ret	DNQ	0
—	(Hong Kong) Theodore-Ford	14	Ret	Ret		DNQ	DNQ	DNQ	Ret	Ret	DNQ	DNQ	DNQ	Ret	DNQ	DNQ	Ret	0
Pos	Constructor	RSA (South Africa)	BRA (Brazil)	USW (United States)	SMR (Italy)	BEL (Belgium)	MON (Monaco)	DET (United States)	CAN (Canada)	NED (Netherlands)	GBR (United Kingdom)	FRA (France)	GER (West Germany)	AUT (Austria)	SUI (France)	ITA (Italy)	CPL (United States)	Points

== Bibliography ==
- Bamsey, Ian (1983). Automobile Sport 82–83. Sparkford: Haynes Manuals. ISBN 0-946321-01-9.
- Donaldson, Gerald (2003). Gilles Villeneuve. London: Virgin. ISBN 0-7535-0747-1.
- Higham, Peter (1995). The Guinness Guide to International Motor Racing. London: Motorbooks International. ISBN 978-0-7603-0152-4.
- Hilton, Christopher (2007). 1982: The Inside Story of an Astonishing Grand Prix Season. Newbury Park, CT; Sparkford: Haynes Publishing. ISBN 978-1-84425-404-0.
- Lang, Mike (1992). Grand Prix! Race-by-Race Account of Formula 1 World Championship Motor Racing. Vol. 4. Sparkford: Haynes Publishing. ISBN 0-85429-733-2.
- Nye, Doug (1986). Autocourse History of the Grand Prix Car 1966–85. Hazleton Publishing. ISBN 0-905138-37-6.
- Pritchard, Anthony (2015). Grand Prix Ford: Ford, Cosworth and the DFV. Poundbury: Veloce Publishing Ltd. ISBN 978-1-84584-624-4.
- Roebuck, Nigel (1999). Chasing the Title. Memorable Moments from Fifty Years of Formula 1. Sparkford: Haynes Publications. ISBN 1-85960-604-0.
- Smith, Roger (2013). Formula 1: All the Races. The World Championship Story Race-by-Race 1950–2012 (2nd ed.). Sparkford: Haynes Publishing. ISBN 978-0-85733-350-6.
- Trzesniowski, Michael (2010). Rennwagentechnik: Grundlagen, Konstruktion, Komponenten, Systeme (in German). Wiesbaden: Vieweg+Teubner Verlag. ISBN 978-3-8348-0857-8.
- Watkins, Sid (1997). Life at the Limit: Triumph and Tragedy in Formula One. London: Pan Books. ISBN 0-330-35139-7.
