= Senator Nye =

Senator Nye may refer to:

- Edd Nye (1932–2025), North Carolina State Senate
- Eva Nye (fl. 2020s), Idaho State Senate
- Gerald Nye (1892–1971), U.S. Senator from North Dakota
- James W. Nye (1815–1876), U.S. Senator from Nevada
- Mark Nye (politician) (1945–2022), Idaho State Senate
- Ray J. Nye (1871–1937), Wisconsin State Senate
