= Ken Andrus =

American politician

Member of the Idaho House of Representatives from the 28A district
- In office December 1, 2012 – December 1, 2016
- Preceded by: Dennis Lake
- Succeeded by: Randy Armstrong

Member of the Idaho House of Representatives from the 29A district
- In office December 1, 2004 – December 1, 2012
- Preceded by: Allen Andersen
- Succeeded by: Carolyn Meline

Personal details
- Born: July 14, 1935 (age 91) Marion, Utah, U.S.
- Party: Republican
- Spouse: Colleen Lloyd
- Children: 8, including Kevin
- Education: Brigham Young University (BS)

Military service
- Branch/service: United States Army
- Years of service: 1960–1962

Ken Andrus (born July 14, 1935) is an American rancher and politician who served as a member of the Idaho House of Representatives from 2004 to 2016, representing the 28A and 29A districts. His son, Kevin Andrus, succeeded him in the legislature.

== Early life and education ==
Andrus was born in Marion, Utah. He earned a Bachelor of Science degree in animal husbandry from Brigham Young University.

== Elections ==
Ken Andrus retired after the 2016 Idaho House of Representatives session.

=== District 28 ===
==== 2014 ====
Andrus was unopposed in the Republican primary. He defeated Kurtis R. Workman with 64.4% of the vote.

==== 2012 ====
Redistricted to 28A, Andrus was unopposed in the Republican primary. He defeated Sam McKee with 62.7% of the vote.

=== District 29 ===
==== 2010 ====
Andrus ran unopposed in the Republican primary. He defeated James ("Jim") W. Allen in the general election with 61.% of the vote.

==== 2008 ====
Andrus was unopposed in the Republican primary. Andrus won the general election with 11,044 votes (56.2%) against Allen R. Andersen.

==== 2006 ====
Unopposed for, Republican primary. Andrus won the November 7, 2006, general election with 7,404 votes (51.41%) against Allen R. Andersen.

==== 2004 ====
Andrus was unopposed in the Republican primary. He won the general election with 9,504 votes (51.9%) against Democratic Representative Allen R. Andersen.
