= Kevin Andrus =

American politician from Idaho

Member of the Idaho House of Representatives
- In office December 1, 2018 – September 12, 2025
- Preceded by: Kelley Packer
- Succeeded by: Mike Veile
- Constituency: 28th district Seat B (2018–2022); 35th district Seat A (2022–2025)

Personal details
- Born: Pocatello, Idaho, U.S.
- Party: Republican
- Spouse: Shelby Andrus
- Parent: Ken Andrus (father)
- Education: Brigham Young University–Idaho (BS); Idaho State University (MBA)

Kevin Andrus is an American politician from Idaho. Andrus served as a Republican member of Idaho House of Representatives from 2018 to 2025. He represented District 35 seat A.

== Early life and education ==
Andrus was born in Pocatello, Idaho. Andrus' father, Ken Andrus, is a rancher who served as a member of the Idaho House of Representatives. Andrus graduated from Marsh Valley High School. In 2012, Andrus earned a Bachelor of Science degree in Agricultural Business and Management from Brigham Young University–Idaho. In 2017, Andrus earned an MBA degree from Idaho State University College of Business.

== Career ==
Andrus was a Ranch Foreman, a horse trainer, and a business consultant. In 2017, Andrus became a loan officer at Ireland Bank in Malad City, Idaho. In 2018, Andrus became a manager at Andrus Ranch.

On November 6, 2018, Andrus won the election and became a Republican member of Idaho House of Representatives for District 28, seat B.

Andrus served on the following committees in the 2019–2020 Legislative session: Agricultural Affairs, Business, and State Affairs.

Andrus resigned from the Idaho House in September 2025 after being appointed to a position in the United States Department of Agriculture.
