= Mike Veile =

American politician

Michael Veile

Member of the Idaho House of Representatives from the 35A district
- Incumbent
- Assumed office September 25, 2025
- Preceded by: Kevin Andrus

Personal details
- Party: Republican
- Children: 4
- Education: Utah State University (M.S., B.S.)

Michael Veile is an American politician, businessman and engineer who is currently serving as a Republican member of the Idaho House of Representatives, representing District 35A. He was appointed to the seat on September 25, 2025, to fill a vacancy left after Kevin Andrus resigned from the Idaho House of Representatives following his appointment to a position in the United States Department of Agriculture.

== Personal life ==
Veile lives in Soda Springs. He is married and has four children. He owns an engineering business in Soda Springs. A licensed engineer, he has both bachelor's and master's degrees from Utah State University in mechanical engineering.
