= Dennis Lake =

American politician

Member of the Idaho House of Representatives from District 28 Seat A
- In office December 1, 2002 – December 1, 2012
- Preceded by: Max Mortenson
- Succeeded by: Ken Andrus

Member of the Idaho House of Representatives from District 31 Seat A
- In office December 1, 1996 – December 1, 2002
- Preceded by: Allan Larsen
- Succeeded by: Larry Bradford

Personal details
- Born: October 5, 1937 (age 88) Rigby, Idaho
- Party: Republican
- Education: Brigham Young University
- Profession: Rancher

Dennis M. Lake (born October 5, 1937 in Rigby, Idaho) was a Republican Idaho State Representative representing District 28 in the A seat from 2002-2012. Lake served consecutively in the Idaho House of Representatives from 1997 until 2002 when the seat was in District 31.

== Education ==
Lake graduated from Rigby High School and earned his bachelor's degree from Brigham Young University in accounting. He began his career working for Basic American a potato processing company and later began ranching, which remains his current occupation.

== Elections ==
On February 27, 2012 Lake announced that he will not run for re - election and retire after the 2012 Idaho Legislative session.

2010

Unopposed for the May 25, 2010, Republican primary, Lake won with 4,868 votes, and won the November 2, 2010, general election with 7,487 votes (68.7%) against Marlene Shurtz (D).

2008

Unopposed for the May 27, 2008, Republican primary, Lake won with 4,204 votes, and was unopposed for the November 4, 2008, general election, winning with 11,379 votes.

2006

Unopposed for the May 23, 2006, Republican primary, Lake won with 3,776 votes; Beach qualified for the general election ballot as a write-in candidate, setting up their third contest. Lake won the November 7, 2006, general election with 6,578 votes (55.39%) against Beach.

2004

Unopposed for the May 25, 2004, Republican primary, Lake won with 4,799 votes; Beach was unopposed for the Democratic primary, setting up a rematch. Lake won the November 2, 2004, general election with 8,472 votes (55.3%) against Beach.

2002

Redistricted to District 28, and with Representative Max Mortenson re-districted to District 34, Lake was unopposed for the May 28, 2002, Republican primary, winning with 4,586 votes, and won the November 5, 2002, general election with 6,651 votes (59.0%) against Beverly Beach (D).

2000

Lake won the May 23, 2000, Republican primary with 3,375 votes (59.9%) against Janet Aikele, and was unopposed for the November 7, 2000, general election, winning with 9,083 votes.

1998

Unopposed for the May 26, 1998, Republican primary, Lake won with 4,595 votes, and won the November 3, 1998, general election with 6,505 votes (66.6%) against Sam Collet (D).

1996

When Republican Representative Allan Larseneft the District 31 A seat open, Lake was unopposed for the May 28, 1996, Republican primary, winning with 4,663 votes, and won the November 5, 1996, general election with 4,663 votes (53.5%) against Democratic nominee Israel Merrill.
