= Mark Nye (politician) =

American politician from Idaho (1945–2022)

Member of the Idaho Senate from the 29th district
- In office December 1, 2016 – July 16, 2022
- Preceded by: Roy Lacey
- Succeeded by: Eva Nye

Member of the Idaho House of Representatives from District 29 Seat A
- In office December 1, 2014 – November 30, 2016
- Preceded by: Carolyn Meline
- Succeeded by: Dustin Manwaring

Personal details
- Born: Walter Marcus William Nye; August 3, 1945 New York City, New York, U.S.
- Died: July 16, 2022 (aged 76) Pocatello, Idaho, U.S.
- Party: Democratic
- Spouse: Eva
- Education: Harvard University (BA); University of Idaho (JD)

Walter Marcus William Nye (August 3, 1945 – July 16, 2022) was an American attorney and politician who served as a Democratic member of the Idaho Senate from the 29th District. Nye previously represented the same district in the Idaho House of Representatives from 2014 to 2016.

== Early life, education, and career ==
Born in New York City in 1945, Nye was raised in Pocatello, Idaho, descending from early pioneers of the Idaho Territory. He graduated from Pocatello High School in 1963 and earned a Bachelor of Arts from Harvard College in 1967. He then returned to Idaho and earned a Juris Doctor from the University of Idaho College of Law in 1974.

== Career ==
Nye began practicing law in Pocatello in 1974. He was the past president of the Idaho State Bar and served on the American Bar Association Board of Governors.

=== Idaho House of Representatives ===
In 2014, incumbent Idaho Representative Carolyn Meline announced she would not seek reelection. Nye subsequently announced his candidacy for the Idaho House of Representatives. He was unopposed in the Democratic primary and defeated Republican Matthew Bloxham and Libertarian Matthew Larsen, both of Pocatello, in the general election.

==== Committee assignments ====
From 2014 to 2016, he served on the Judiciary, Rules and Administration Committee, Local Government Committee, and Revenue and Taxation Committee.

=== Idaho Senate ===
In 2016, incumbent Idaho Senator Roy Lacey announced he would not seek reelection. Nye subsequently announced his candidacy for Idaho Senate. Nye was unopposed in the Democratic primary and defeated Republican Tom Katsilometes and Libertarian Sierra "Idaho Lorax" Carta in the general election.

Idaho law allows any voter to challenge the election of a legislator, and the respective legislative body has full discretion to judge the election and qualifications of members in deciding whether to seat them. Nye's Republican opponent Katsilometes challenged Nye's election on the grounds that Nye had allegedly violated campaign finance laws and vote counting irregularities. The Idaho Senate dismissed the challenge unanimously and seated Nye. It was the first time an election had been challenged since 1981.

==== Committee assignments ====
- Finance Committee
- Joint Finance-Appropriations Committee
- Judiciary and Rules Committee
- Local Government and Taxation

== Elections ==
District 29 House Seat A - Part of Bannock County
Year	Candidate	Votes	Pct	Candidate	Votes	Pct	Candidate	Votes	Pct
2014 Primary	Mark Nye	2,268	100%						
2014 General	Mark Nye	5,936	53.1%	Matthew Bloxham	4,597	41.1%	Matthew Larsen	643	5.8%

District 29 Senate - Part of Bannock County
Year	Candidate	Votes	Pct	Candidate	Votes	Pct	Candidate	Votes	Pct
2016 Primary	Mark Nye	951	100.0%						
2016 General	Mark Nye	8,018	48.1%	Tom Katsilometes	7,482	44.9%	Sierra "Idaho Lorax" Carta	1,159	7.0%

== Personal life ==
Nye died on July 16, 2022, at the age of 76.
