= John Nye =

John Nye may refer to:

- John Nye (scientist) (1923–2019), English physicist and glaciologist
- John Nye (cricketer) (1914–2002), English cricketer
