= Harry Nye =

Harry Nye may refer to:

- Harry Gale Nye Jr. (1908–1987), American industrialist, entrepreneur, and sailor
- Harry Hess Nye (1887–1954), president of Elizabethtown College
