= Nigel Roebuck =

British motorsport journalist (born 1946)

- Born: March 1946 (age 79–80); Manchester, Lancashire, England
- Occupation: Motorsport journalist
- Known for: Editor-in-Chief of Motor Sport magazine

Nigel Scott Roebuck (born March 1946) is an English journalist. Since 1971, he has reported on Formula One, and is considered one of the sport's most influential writers. From 2007 to 2016, he was editor-in-chief of Motor Sport magazine. Roebuck was educated at Giggleswick School in North Yorkshire, also the alma mater of Keith Duckworth, another well-known figure in Formula One. He wrote freelance articles for many publications, as well as being Press Officer for the Embassy Hill team in 1975. At the same time, he was writing for Autosport magazine and became their Grand Prix correspondent in 1976.

Roebuck's weekly column, entitled "5th Column", in deference to Emilio Mola Vidal, a Nationalist general in the Spanish Civil War, became a must-read for its insights into drivers, team managers, and some of the self-important bureaucrats running Formula One in the late 1970s and 1980s. While covering Formula One (a category of racing that he loved more than any other), he became close to several drivers, notably Gilles Villeneuve, Chris Amon, Keke Rosberg, Mario Andretti, Eddie Cheever, Derek Warwick, Ayrton Senna, and Alain Prost. He is also a passionate collector of Roadster-era United States oval racing literature. Among Roebuck's freelance outlets were Autosport, plus Autoweek in the United States and a retrospective column in Motor Sport. At the end of 2007, he stopped writing his weekly articles for Autosport magazine and website, to concentrate on his new position as editor-in-chief of Motor Sport magazine.

In 1982, Roebuck drove a Formula One Renault turbo at Circuit Paul Ricard in France. Roebuck was a commentator for the ESPN coverage of the 1988 Canadian Grand Prix. His column was one of the most popular in Motor Sport magazine and ran for over nine years. In January 2017, Motor Sport magazine announced that Roebuck would no longer be writing for the magazine, returning to his spiritual home, Autosport magazine.
