= David Nye =

David Nye may refer to:

- David Nye (racing driver) (born 1958), race car driver
- David Nye (judge) (born 1958), United States District Judge for the United States District Court for the District of Idaho
- David E. Nye (born 1946), professor of American history at the University of Southern Denmark
- David Evelyn Nye (1906–1986), British architect
- David Nye, Filipino journalist and news anchor, former senior editor of Global Times
