= Phila Calder Nye =

American art historian

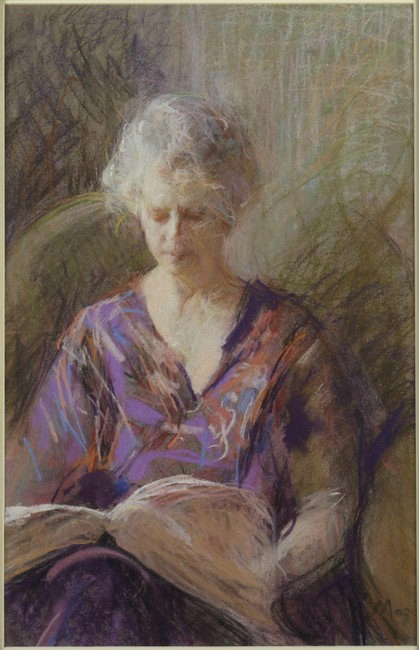
- Born: February 22, 1871; Wilmington
- Died: May 11, 1959; Wilmington

Calder Nye (February 22, 1871 – May 11, 1959) was an American art historian. She was the first female director of the Index of Christian Art at Princeton University.

== Life ==
Phila Calder Nye was born on February 22, 1871, in Wilmington, North Carolina.

She attended the Mount Vernon Seminary and College in Washington, D.C. from 1889 to 1891.

In 1920, she became director of the Index of Christian Art at Princeton. She retired in 1933.

Her work appeared in the American Journal of Archaeology, Art Bulletin, Art in America, and Art & Archaeology.

== Works ==
- Art History in Outline, Washington, D.C.: Press of W.F. Roberts, 1901

== Death and legacy ==
She married Joseph Keith Nye. Phila Calder Nye died on 11 May 1959 in Wilmington, NC.
