= Carolyn Meline =

American politician from Idaho

Member of the Idaho House of Representatives from District 29 Seat A
- In office December 1, 2012 – November 30, 2014
- Preceded by: Ken Andrus
- Succeeded by: Mark Nye

Personal details
- Born: February 25, 1937 (age 89) Carey, Idaho
- Party: Democratic
- Education: Colorado Women's College

Carolyn Meline (born February 25, 1935) was a Democratic Idaho State Representative from 2012 to 2014 representing District 29 in the A seat.

== Education ==
Born in Carey, Idaho, Meline graduated from Rupert High School and attended North Idaho College.

== Elections ==
- 2012 With Republican Representative Ken Andrus redistricted to 28A, Nate Murphy was unopposed for the May 15, 2012 Democratic Primary and won with 726 votes, but withdrew; Meline replaced him, and won the four-way November 6, 2012 General election with 7,971 votes (45.6%) against Republican nominee Dave Bowen, Independent Bob Croker, and a write-in candidate who received 3 votes.
