= Richard Nye =

British composer

- Born: 16 February 1967 (age 59)
- Genres: Contemporary, Classical
- Occupations: Composer and teacher
- Website: www.richardnye.co.uk

Publishers
- Labels: Andresier Editions, Canasg Choral Music, Banks Music Publications, Forton Music, Chichester Music Press and Tim Knight Music

Richard Nye is an instrumental and choral composer born 1967 in Gloucester, England.

== Biography ==
His first published work, Three Pyrotechnics for Solo Clarinet (1993 - pub. Cascade Music Publishing) is now included as part of the Trinity College Advanced Clarinet repertoire. Nye was a chorister at Gloucester Cathedral under John Sanders and began composing at a young age. Guided by the Cheltenham-based composer Tony Hewitt-Jones whilst he was still at school, Nye later went on to study music in London. He received his South Bank debut with 8 'til Late (8 hands on 2 pianos) performed at the South Bank Centre in 2001 by Piano 40, whilst Nye was living on the Isles of Scilly. The work was later released on CD by Regent Records.

Recently he composed music inspired by works of art, most notably Circus! based on the Circus Prints by the late Eric James Mellon, and Annunciation based on the painting of the same name by American artist, John Collier. Nye also works with samples, historical recordings and visual media. His orchestral work Icarus was used alongside a short animated film. Nye received his New York debut in 2013 with the micro-opera Bucca, a piece that formed the basis of the award-winning 20 minute multimedia piece, Edge of the World. Nye continues to combine experimental works such as Underworld performed at the University of Bremen in 2014 by Juan María Solare, with contemporary choral and instrumental compositions. Since 2021 Nye has worked extensively with electronics, sample libraries and field recordings, writing and producing three albums. In August 2022, his electronic composition EXPRSN was broadcast on BBC Radio 3. In September 2024, Nye was appointed Composer in Residence for the Wiltshire town of Mere. Nye's music is published with a number of works available from a variety of instrumental and choral publishing houses.

== Selected Compositions ==
- Three Pyrotechnic's for Solo Clarinet (1993),
- Mind Games for solo piano (1999),
- 8 'til Late for 8 hands on 2 pianos (2000),
- Icarus for orchestra (2000 - updated and scored for animated film in 2012)
- Cave Paintings for alto sax and piano (2002),
- Susvar for solo marimba (2002–2003),
- Online for 8 hands on 2 pianos (2002 - orchestrated in 2010),
- From Hambledon's Ridge for flute, oboe and clarinet (2005),
- Eric's Age of Blue for solo piano (2005),
- Colour Poems (words by Charlotta Skule) for SSAATBB (2006),
- Walking Song (words by Ivor Gurney) SATB and piano (2008)- music reset to words by Ian York (2010),
- Looking at the Mirror of the Moon (words by Thích Nhất Hạnh) for soprano, violin, viola and 'cello (2009),
- Annunciation for oboe, two voices (or choral parts) and piano (2009),
- Circus! for oboe, violin and piano (2010),
- Whispering Walls for marimba, harp and violin (2010),
- Steady Beats the Heart SATB and jazz piano (2011) (Words by Mandy Anson),
- The Gardener for oboe, violin and 'cello (2011),
- The Unfathomable Blue for solo piano (2012),
- Bucca a 1-minute music theatre piece for soprano and piano (2013).
- This Marvellous Machine for 8 hands on 1 piano (2013).
- Underworld for the lowest note on the piano (2014).
- Edge of the World a multimedia artistic work inspired by Levant Mine, Cornwall, UK (2014).
- Missa Brevis for SATB and organ (2015).
- Three Lyrics for oboe, clarinet and piano (2015 rev.2020).
- EXPRSN for multiple synthesisers and electronics (2022).
- Ten Vignettes for solo piano (2022).
- Fear not, for I am with you for unaccompanied SATB (2024).

== Recordings ==
Piano 40 (Regent Records)
