= Doug Nye =

British motoring journalist and author (born 1945)

Doug Nye (born October 1945) is an English motoring journalist and author. He lives in Farnham, Surrey, England.

He is generally recognised as a world authority on competition cars of any period from 1887, and is a consultant to the Bonhams auction house, the Collier Collection (in the US, now Revs Institute) and sits on the Advisory Council of the National Motor Museum at Beaulieu. He has also consulted for The Dutch National Motor Museum (Louwman Museum), the Brooklands Museum in England, McLaren International and McLaren Cars Limited. He was a founding consultant to the SpeedVision TV network in the US and to the Donington Collection of single-seater racing cars, is Historical Consultant (founding) to Goodwood Motorsport – creators of the Goodwood Festival of Speed and the Goodwood Revival Meeting, and a member of the Historians Council of the International Motor Racing Research Center at Watkins Glen, NY.

At the age of 18 he went straight from grammar school to the staff of Motor Racing magazine based at Brands Hatch. Since then he has written more than 70 motor racing books.

He has presented assorted TV programmes covering motor racing and collectors' cars, and since 2004 – with colleague David Weguelin has produced the Motorfilms Quarterly series of 90-minute archival movie DVDs/video tapes.

He has also been, or is currently, a regular contributor to The Daily Telegraph and Motor Sport.

In November 2022, for his body of work over more than 50 years, the Royal Automobile Club Motoring Book of the Year panel presented him with a Lifetime Achievement Award. In 2024 Doug Nye's The Last Eye Witness - the pioneering motor racing photography of Maurice Louis Branger 1902-1914, won two prestigious Motoring Book of the Year awards.

== Publications ==
partial list

- — (1969). Racing Cars. Fountain Press.
- — (1970). British Cars of the Sixties. Thomas Nelson. ISBN 0-17-148022-8.
- — (1972). The Story of Lotus 1961–1971. Bentley Publishers. ISBN 0-8376-0051-0.
- — (1973). International motor racing. Crowell. ISBN 0-690-00428-1.
- — (1974). Great Racing Cars of the Donington Collection. Macmillan. ISBN 0-333-17813-0.
- — (1975). The Grand Prix Tyrrells: The Jackie Stewart Cars 1970–1973. Macmillan. ISBN 0-333-17286-8.
- — (1975). Motor Racing Mavericks. Batsford. ISBN 0-7134-2856-2.
- — (1975). Racing car oddities. Arco. ISBN 0-668-03724-5.
- — (1977). British Grand Prix, 1926–76. Batsford. ISBN 0-7134-3283-7.
- — (1977). Great Racing Drivers. Hamlyn. ISBN 0-600-37569-2.
- — (1978). United States Grand Prix. Hodder. ISBN 0-7134-1263-1.
- — (1979). Dino: The Little Ferrari V6 & V8 Racing and Road Cars 1957– 1979. Osprey. ISBN 0-85045-330-5.
- — (1980). The Colonel's Ferraris: Maranello Concessionaires' racing team. Ampersand Press. ISBN 0-906613-02-7.
- — (1980). Powered by Jaguar: The Cooper, HWM, Tojeiro and Lister Sports-racing Cars. Motor Racing Publications. ISBN 0-900549-56-4.
- — (1982). Racers: Inside Story of Williams Grand Prix Engineering. Littlehampton Book Services. ISBN 0-213-16815-4.
- — (1983). Cooper Cars. Osprey. ISBN 0-85045-488-3.
- Moss, Stirling; Nye, Doug (1987). Stirling Moss: My Cars, My Career. Patrick Stephens. ISBN 0-85059-925-3.
- — (1983). McLaren: Grand Prix, Can-Am and Indy Cars. Hazleton Publishing. ISBN 0-905138-28-7.
- — (1989). Famous Racing Cars: Fifty of the Greatest, from Panhard to Williams-Honda. Patrick Stephens. ISBN 1-85260-036-5.
- Goddard, Geoffrey; Nye, Doug (1990). Track Pass, A Photographer's View of Motor Racing 1950-1980. Crowood Press. ISBN 9781852234829.
- — (1991). Classic Racing Cars: Postwar Front-engined Grand Prix Cars. Foulis. ISBN 0-85429-775-8.
- — (1991). Jim Clark. Hazleton Publishing. ISBN 0-905138-77-5.
- — (1992). Chaparral: Complete History of Jim Hall's Chaparral Race Cars 1961–1970. Motorbooks International. ISBN 0-87938-607-X.
- — (1992). History of the Grand Prix Car, 1966–91. Hazleton Publishing. ISBN 0-905138-94-5.
- — (1993). History of the Grand Prix Car, 1945–65. Hazleton Publishing. ISBN 1-874557-50-0.
- — (1994). Classic Sports and Supercars. Regency House. ISBN 1-85361-410-6.
- — (1994). BRM: The Saga of British Racing Motors: Front Engined Cars, 1945–60. Vol. 1. Motor Racing Publications. ISBN 0-947981-37-3.
- Goddard, Geoffrey; Nye, Doug (1995). Ferrari in Camera, From Ascari to Villeneuve. Palawan Press. ISBN 9780952300915.
- — (2003). BRM: The Saga of British Racing Motors: Rear-Engined Cars, 1960–79. Vol. 2. Motor Racing Publications. ISBN 1-899870-00-8.
- — (2008). BRM: The Saga of British Racing Motors: Monocoque Cars, 1964–68. Vol. 3. Motor Racing Publications. ISBN 978-1-899870-64-6.
- — (2004). The Jack Brabham Story. Pavilion Books. ISBN 1-86205-651-X.
- — (2006). Ferrari: The Red Dream. Motorbooks International. ISBN 0-7603-2827-7.
- — (2008). Goodwood Revival: The First Ten Years. Merrell Publishers. ISBN 978-1-85894-449-4.
- — (2015). Ferrari 250 GT Short Wheelbase - The Autobiography of 2119 GT. Porter Press International. ISBN 978-1907085239.
