= Eva Nye =

American politician

Member of the Idaho Senate from District 29
- In office August 5, 2022 – November 30, 2022
- Preceded by: Mark Nye
- Succeeded by: James Ruchti

Personal details
- Party: Democratic

Eva Nye is an American politician serving as a member of the Idaho Senate for the 29th legislative district. Nye was appointed to the Senate by Governor Brad Little on August 5, 2022, replacing her husband, Mark Nye.

== Career ==
Nye served as a member of the Pocatello City Council for 14 years. She was also a substitute legislator for Elaine Smith and Chris Abernathy. After her husband, Mark Nye, died in office on July 16, 2022, Nye was appointed to serve in the Idaho Senate for the remainder of his term.
