= 1982 Detroit Grand Prix =

- Race 7 of 16 in the 1982 Formula One World Championship

Race details
- Date: June 6, 1982
- Official name: 1st Detroit Grand Prix
- Location: Detroit Street Circuit; Detroit, Michigan
- Course: Temporary street course
- Course length: 4.168 km (2.59 miles)
- Distance: 62 laps, 258.428 km (160.58 miles)
- Weather: Sunny and warm with temperatures reaching up to 72 °F (22 °C); wind speeds up to 16.1 miles per hour (25.9 km/h)

Pole position
Driver	(France) Alain Prost	Renault
- Time: 1:48.537

Fastest lap
Driver	(France) Alain Prost	Renault
- Time: 1:50.438 on lap 45

Podium
First	(United Kingdom) John Watson	McLaren-Ford
Second	(United States) Eddie Cheever	Ligier-Matra
Third	(France) Didier Pironi	Ferrari

The 1982 Detroit Grand Prix was a Formula One motor race held in Detroit, Michigan on June 6, 1982. It was the seventh race of the 1982 Formula One World Championship, and the first Formula One race to be held in Detroit.

The 62-lap race was won by John Watson, driving a McLaren-Ford, with Eddie Cheever second in a Ligier-Matra and Didier Pironi third in a Ferrari.

== Summary ==
=== Qualifying ===
Due to organizational problems, extra practice planned for Thursday was cancelled, and the first qualifying session on Friday had to be postponed. There was time for only a one-hour practice session on Friday, and so qualifying would take place on Saturday in two one-hour sessions, four hours apart. Saturday was cold and overcast with a threat of rain, and nearly all the drivers scrambled to get a time in on the dry track while they could, with many spins and trips down the escape roads of the unfamiliar circuit. The afternoon session was wet throughout, as expected, and the times from the morning session did indeed determine the grid.

Alain Prost took Renault's sixth pole in seven races on the season with a lap of 1:48.537, an average of less than 134 km/h (83 mph) (134 kilometers per hour), slower than Monaco. Andrea de Cesaris, the only non-Renault driver with a pole so far in 1982 (Long Beach), put his Alfa Romeo alongside Prost on the front row with a 1:48.872, ahead of the Williams of Keke Rosberg. For the second straight race, Ferrari had only one entry following the death of Gilles Villeneuve in Belgium four weeks earlier, and Didier Pironi qualified it in fourth spot.

The lone American driver in the race, Eddie Cheever, put on a fine show for the home crowd, placing his Ligier ninth, behind the Lotus pair of Nigel Mansell and Elio de Angelis and just ahead of Niki Lauda's McLaren. The biggest surprise, however, was seeing defending World Champion Nelson Piquet at the bottom of the time sheets. Problems with the BMW engines in both his race car and spare during the morning session and rain in the afternoon combined to keep him off the grid for Sunday's race. This is one of only two instances of a reigning World Champion failing to qualify for a Grand Prix, the other being when Jody Scheckter failed to qualify for the 1980 Canadian Grand Prix.

=== Race ===
In contrast to Saturday afternoon, Sunday was mostly sunny and pleasant as a flotilla of boats dotted the river across from the circuit. The top three drivers all managed excellent starts, and Prost led de Cesaris and Rosberg through the first turn. Following them at the end of Lap one were Pironi, Mansell, Bruno Giacomelli, Cheever and Lauda. Manfred Winkelhock retired from an excellent fifth position when a front hub upright that had been replaced on the grid broke anyway, putting his ATS into the wall. Just two laps later, on Lap three, de Cesaris limped into the pits with a broken driveshaft, leaving Rosberg in second place, three seconds behind Prost.

On Lap seven, under pressure from de Angelis, Roberto Guerrero's Ensign went wide at the first corner. De Angelis tried to go through on the inside, but when Guerrero resumed his line, the two collided. The Lotus was able to continue, but Guerrero slid to a halt in the tire wall. Jochen Mass and Watson were able to avoid the disabled Ensign, but when Riccardo Patrese came upon the scene, he locked up and hit the tire wall right next to Guerrero, losing a wheel. A brake duct on Patrese's car quickly caught fire, and though the disabled cars seemed to be out of the way, the sight of two cars stopped on the track, one in flames, prompted the Clerk of the Course to call for the red flag.

The cars returned to the pits and waited for nearly an hour while all manner of repairs were made by the mechanics. Prost had his skirts changed and fuel topped off, Lauda changed his leaking oil cooler, and Guerrero, Winkelhock and Patrese, who had retired, even brought their spare cars out on the grid for the restart! This, at least, was not allowed, and eighteen cars restarted the race in running order, with the final result to be determined by the sum of the two times recorded in the two parts of the race.

Prost again took the lead off the grid, and one lap later he led Rosberg, Pironi, Giacomelli, Cheever, René Arnoux, Lauda and Mansell. Immediately, Prost began to distance himself from Rosberg, who was also pulling away from Pironi and, after fifteen laps (total), led by five seconds. Gradually, however, the Renault began to develop electronic injection problems, as teammate Arnoux had several laps earlier, and the Frenchman saw his lead over Rosberg begin to evaporate. By Lap 21, the two cars were nose to tail, and a lap later, the Williams took the lead in brilliant fashion as Rosberg pulled alongside entering one of the many tight right-hand corners, stayed there through the corner on the outside, and emerged slightly sideways but in front. Prost continued to fall back and eventually pitted, while a furious dice continued behind Rosberg, now over second place, between Pironi, Giacomelli, Cheever and Lauda.

Behind this group, amazingly, came the charging McLaren of John Watson, who had stormed through nearly the entire field from seventeenth place on the original grid. When Cheever and Lauda both overtook Giacomelli as he got sideways exiting a corner, Watson was quickly nose to tail behind Giacomelli and struggling to get through. On Lap 30, with Rosberg leading by 15 seconds, Watson passed Giacomelli, but the Italian counterattacked a moment later when the McLaren went wide. Giacomelli tried to force his way through on the inside, but his left front wheel hit Watson's right rear, and Giacomelli ended up in the wall. Pironi had been holding up both Lauda and Cheever, but when Watson latched on to them, he passed all three on the same lap to take over second place, thirteen seconds behind Rosberg.

In two laps, the gap was down to seven seconds, then two seconds, and at the end of Lap 37, Watson was two seconds up, as Rosberg had lost third gear. Overall, however, on combined time, Rosberg was still eighteen seconds ahead, so he attempted merely to stay close to the McLaren. Meanwhile Lauda, perhaps inspired by his teammate, had passed both Cheever and Pironi, and now also approached Rosberg. Likely knowing the Williams was in trouble, he unwisely made a late dive down the inside of Turn One. He locked his wheels, hit the wall and broke his suspension, leaving Cheever in third place.

Secure in the lead, Watson was able to back off as Rosberg struggled with fuel feed problems and worn tires, in addition to his ailing gearbox, and dropped all the way back to fifth on the track and fourth on combined time. With an average speed of only 78 mph, the two-hour time limit was well short of the intended 76 laps, and Watson took his second win of the season, which was the first Detroit Grand Prix, at America's sixth different Formula One venue. American Eddie Cheever claimed second for his best Grand Prix finish, ahead of Pironi in third.

Despite a mountain of teething problems with the new circuit, the organizers of the race received excellent reviews for their efforts, and a new American city had made its entrance to Formula One. With two US races already run in 1982, one still remained, as, for the first time ever, one country would host three events in a single Grand Prix season.

== Classification ==
=== Qualifying ===
Pos	No	Driver	Constructor	Q1	Q2	Gap
1	15	(France) Alain Prost	Renault	1:48.537	2:14.616	—
2	22	(Italy) Andrea de Cesaris	Alfa Romeo	1:48.872	2:10.770	+0.335
3	6	(Finland) Keke Rosberg	Williams-Ford	1:49.264	2:12.559	+0.727
4	28	(France) Didier Pironi	Ferrari	1:49.903	2:13.665	+1.366
5	9	(West Germany) Manfred Winkelhock	ATS-Ford	1:50.066	2:11.260	+1.529
6	23	(Italy) Bruno Giacomelli	Alfa Romeo	1:50.252	no time	+1.715
7	12	(United Kingdom) Nigel Mansell	Lotus-Ford	1:50.294	2:20.888	+1.757
8	11	(Italy) Elio de Angelis	Lotus-Ford	1:50.443	2:12.481	+1.906
9	25	(United States) Eddie Cheever	Ligier-Matra	1:50.520	2:11.745	+1.983
10	8	(Austria) Niki Lauda	McLaren-Ford	1:51.026	2:09.121	+2.489
11	14	(Colombia) Roberto Guerrero	Ensign-Ford	1:51.039	no time	+2.502
12	5	(Republic of Ireland) Derek Daly	Williams-Ford	1:51.227	2:11.554	+2.690
13	26	(France) Jacques Laffite	Ligier-Matra	1:51.270	no time	+2.733
14	2	(Italy) Riccardo Patrese	Brabham-Ford	1:51.508	no time	+2.971
15	16	(France) René Arnoux	Renault	1:51.514	no time	+2.977
16	3	(Italy) Michele Alboreto	Tyrrell-Ford	1:51.618	2:11.678	+3.081
17	7	(United Kingdom) John Watson	McLaren-Ford	1:51.868	2:11.384	+3.331
18	17	(West Germany) Jochen Mass	March-Ford	1:52.271	2:13.486	+3.734
19	29	(Switzerland) Marc Surer	Arrows-Ford	1:52.316	2:12.033	+3.779
20	4	(United Kingdom) Brian Henton	Tyrrell-Ford	1:52.867	2:22.663	+4.330
21	18	(Brazil) Raul Boesel	March-Ford	1:52.870	2:14.385	+4.333
22	31	(France) Jean-Pierre Jarier	Osella-Ford	1:52.988	2:13.648	+4.451
23	32	(Italy) Riccardo Paletti	Osella-Ford	1:54.084	2:24.878	+5.547
24	30	(Italy) Mauro Baldi	Arrows-Ford	1:54.332	2:14.746	+5.795
25	10	(Chile) Eliseo Salazar	ATS-Ford	1:55.633	2:16.139	+7.096
26	20	(Brazil) Chico Serra	Fittipaldi-Ford	1:55.848	2:24.739	+7.311
27	19	(Spain) Emilio de Villota	March-Ford	1:56.589	no time	+8.052
28	1	(Brazil) Nelson Piquet	Brabham-BMW	1:57.779	no time	+9.242
29	33	(Netherlands) Jan Lammers	Theodore-Ford	no time	no time	

=== Race ===
Pos	No	Driver	Constructor	Tyre	Laps	Time/Retired	Grid	Points
1	7	(United Kingdom) John Watson	McLaren-Ford	MI	62	1:58:41.043	17	9
2	25	(United States) Eddie Cheever	Ligier-Matra	MI	62	+ 15.726	9	6
3	28	(France) Didier Pironi	Ferrari	G	62	+ 28.077	4	4
4	6	(Finland) Keke Rosberg	Williams-Ford	G	62	+ 1:11.976	3	3
5	5	(Republic of Ireland) Derek Daly	Williams-Ford	G	62	+ 1:23.757	12	2
6	26	(France) Jacques Laffite	Ligier-Matra	MI	61	+ 1 Lap	13	1
7	17	(West Germany) Jochen Mass	March-Ford	A	61	+ 1 Lap	18	
8	29	(Switzerland) Marc Surer	Arrows-Ford	P	61	+ 1 Lap	19	
9	4	(United Kingdom) Brian Henton	Tyrrell-Ford	G	60	+ 2 Laps	20	
10	16	(France) René Arnoux	Renault	MI	59	+ 3 Laps	15	
11	20	(Brazil) Chico Serra	Fittipaldi-Ford	P	59	+ 3 Laps	26	
NC	15	(France) Alain Prost	Renault	MI	54	+ 8 Laps	1	
Ret	12	(United Kingdom) Nigel Mansell	Lotus-Ford	G	44	Engine	7	
Ret	8	(Austria) Niki Lauda	McLaren-Ford	MI	40	Collision	10	
Ret	3	(Italy) Michele Alboreto	Tyrrell-Ford	G	40	Spun Off	16	
Ret	23	(Italy) Bruno Giacomelli	Alfa Romeo	MI	30	Collision	6	
Ret	11	(Italy) Elio de Angelis	Lotus-Ford	G	17	Gearbox	8	
Ret	10	(Chile) Eliseo Salazar	ATS-Ford	MI	13	Spun Off	25	
Ret	14	(Colombia) Roberto Guerrero	Ensign-Ford	MI	6	Collision	11	
Ret	2	(Italy) Riccardo Patrese	Brabham-Ford	G	6	Collision	14	
Ret	22	(Italy) Andrea de Cesaris	Alfa Romeo	MI	2	Transmission	2	
Ret	31	(France) Jean-Pierre Jarier	Osella-Ford	P	2	Ignition	22	
Ret	9	(West Germany) Manfred Winkelhock	ATS-Ford	MI	1	Suspension/Spun Off	5	
Ret	18	(Brazil) Raul Boesel	March-Ford	A	0	Collision	21	
Ret	30	(Italy) Mauro Baldi	Arrows-Ford	P	0	Collision	24	
DNS	32	(Italy) Riccardo Paletti	Osella-Ford	P			23	
DNQ	19	(Spain) Emilio de Villota	March-Ford	A				
DNQ	1	(Brazil) Nelson Piquet	Brabham-BMW	G				
DNQ	33	(Netherlands) Jan Lammers	Theodore-Ford	G				

== Championship standings after the race ==
Drivers' Championship standings

Pos	Driver	Points
1	(United Kingdom) John Watson	26
2	(France) Didier Pironi	20
3	(France) Alain Prost	18
4	(Finland) Keke Rosberg	17
5	(Italy) Riccardo Patrese	13

Constructors' Championship standings

Pos	Constructor	Points
1	(United Kingdom) McLaren-Ford	38
2	(Italy) Ferrari	26
3	(United Kingdom) Williams-Ford	26
4	(France) Renault	22
5	(United Kingdom) Lotus-Ford	14

- Note: Only the top five positions are included for both sets of standings.

Previous race: 1982 Monaco Grand Prix	FIA Formula One World Championship; 1982 season	Next race: 1982 Canadian Grand Prix
Previous race: None	Detroit Grand Prix	Next race: 1983 Detroit Grand Prix
