= Chico Serra =

Brazilian racing driver (born 1957)

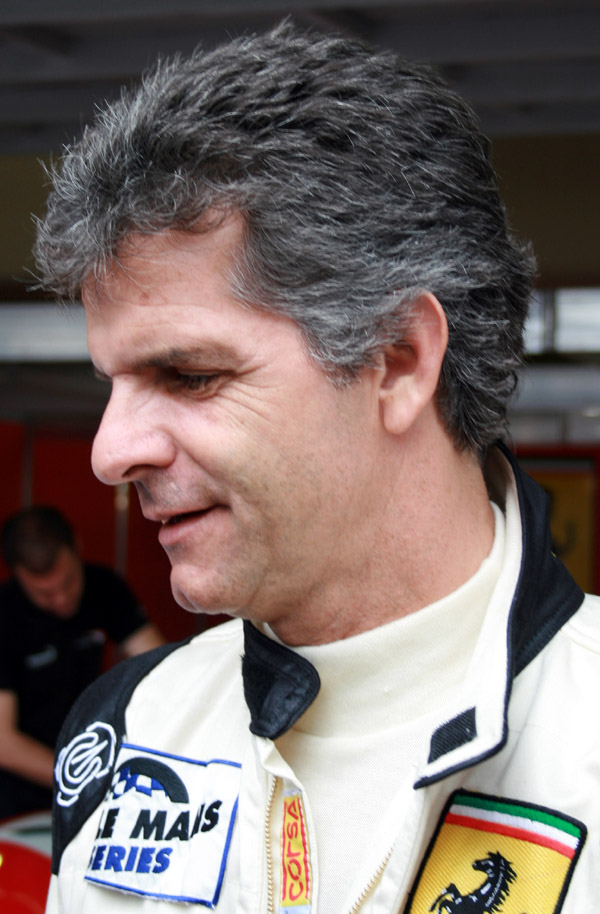
- Serra in 2007
- Born: Francisco Adolpho Serra; 3 February 1957 (age 69); São Paulo, Brazil
- Relatives: Daniel Serra (son)

Formula One World Championship career
- Nationality: (Brazil) Brazilian
- Active years: 1981–1983
- Team(s): Fittipaldi, Arrows
- Entries: 33 (18 starts)
- Championships: 0
- Wins: 0
- Podiums: 0
- Career points: 1
- Pole positions: 0
- Fastest laps: 0
- First entry: 1981 United States Grand Prix West
- Last entry: 1983 Monaco Grand Prix

Francisco Adolpho "Chico" Serra (born 3 February 1957) is a Brazilian racing driver.

== Biography ==
Serra made his mark in International motorsport when he won the 1977 Formula Ford Festival and the 1979 British Formula 3 Championship, one season after his compatriot Nelson Piquet had won the title. His performance caught the eye of Emerson Fittipaldi, himself a British Formula 3 Championship winner in 1969, who signed him for his Formula One team Fittipaldi.

Serra debuted alongside Keke Rosberg on 15 March 1981 in Long Beach, finishing seventh. Serra's result would turn out to be the best one for the team over the rest of the season. In 1982, with Rosberg moving to Williams, Fittipaldi resized the operation, fielding only one car for Serra. Serra scored his first championship point for finishing sixth in the 1982 Belgian Grand Prix. At the 1982 Canadian Grand Prix, Serra and countryman Raul Boesel made headlines for having a short scuffle after the qualifying session. Serra was furious at Boesel for blocking his last flying lap after waving Rosberg by. Boesel denied that this was intentional. Fittipaldi's lack of pace meant that Serra occasionally failed to qualify. As the best of the non-qualified drivers, he was in contention for starting the 1982 Swiss Grand Prix after Ferrari withdrew Patrick Tambay's entry but FIA rejected Serra's request on the ground that Ferrari announced Tambay's retirement, who on Sunday morning did not feel well enough to race, too late.

In 1983, Serra raced for Arrows. Despite scoring three top-ten finishes in his first four outings with the team, he was released after the 1983 Monaco Grand Prix and replaced with Thierry Boutsen. Overall, Serra participated in 33 Formula One World Championship Grands Prix.

Following the end of his Formula One career, Serra made one CART Champ Car start in 1985 at the Portland International Raceway for Ensign Racing but suffered an engine failure.

Serra has participated in Brazilian stock car racing since the 1980s where he won the Mil Milhas Brasil in 1981 and was series champion in 1999, 2000 and 2001.

Serra was a good friend of Ayrton Senna as they both climbed the motorsport ladder at the same time. In 1981, Serra recommended Senna to Ralph Firman, who had his team in the Formula Ford 1600. In 1994, Serra refused to attend Senna's funeral. In an interview with the Brazilian magazine Grid, he said that he disliked the hypocrisy surrounding the event. "There was too much pretence, which made me sick. Some people came a long way just to use the situation for their own good. These people never helped him, and they wanted to make us believe that they were great friends who were suffering so much. Going to the funeral was more beneficial to them than winning at Indianapolis".

Serra is the father of racing driver Daniel Serra.

== Racing record ==
=== Complete European Formula Two Championship results ===
(key) (Races in bold indicate pole position; races in italics indicate fastest lap)

Year	Entrant	Chassis	Engine	1	2	3	4	5	6	7	8	9	10	11	12	Pos.	Pts
1980	Project Four Racing	March 802	BMW	THR; 4	HOC; 4	NÜR; Ret	VLL; Ret	PAU; Ret	SIL; 8	ZOL; Ret	MUG; Ret	ZAN; 4	PER; Ret	MIS; Ret	HOC; Ret	11th	9

=== Complete Formula One World Championship results ===
(key)

Year	Team	Chassis	Engine	1	2	3	4	5	6	7	8	9	10	11	12	13	14	15	16	WDC	Points
1981	Fittipaldi Automotive	Fittipaldi F8C	Cosworth V8	USW; 7	BRA; Ret	ARG; Ret	SMR; DNQ	BEL; Ret	MON; DNQ	ESP; 11	FRA; DNS	GBR; DNQ	GER; DNQ	AUT	NED; DNQ	ITA; DNQ	CAN; DNQ	CPL; DNQ		NC	0
1982	Fittipaldi Automotive	Fittipaldi F8D	Cosworth V8	RSA; 17	BRA; Ret	USW; DNQ	SMR	BEL; 6	MON; DNPQ	DET; 11	CAN; DNQ	NED; Ret	GBR; Ret							26th	1
1982	Fittipaldi Automotive	Fittipaldi F9	Cosworth V8											FRA; DNQ	GER; 11	AUT; 7	SUI; DNQ	ITA; 11	CPL; DNQ	26th	1
1983	Arrows Racing Team	Arrows A6	Cosworth V8	BRA; 9	USW	FRA; Ret	SMR; 8	MON; 7	BEL	DET	CAN	GBR	GER	AUT	NED	ITA	EUR	RSA		NC	0

=== Indy Car World Series ===
(key) (Races in bold indicate pole position)

Year	Team	No.	1	2	3	4	5	6	7	8	9	10	11	12	13	14	15	Rank	Points	Ref
1985	Theodore Racing	15	LBH	INDY	MIL	POR; 25	MEA	CLE	MCH	ROA	POC	MDO	SAN	MCH	LAG	PHX	MIA	**57th**	**0**	

=== Complete European Le Mans Series results ===
(key) (Races in bold indicate pole position; races in italics indicate fastest lap)

Year	Entrant	Class	Chassis	Engine	1	2	3	4	5	6	Pos.	Pts
2007	JMB Racing	GT2	Ferrari F430 GT	Ferrari 4.0 L V8	MNZ	VAL	NÜR	SPA	SIL	INT; 6	44th	3

Sporting positions
Preceded by Derek Daly	Formula Ford Festival; Winner; 1977	Succeeded by Michael Roe
Preceded by Nelson Piquet; 1978 BARC Series Champion	British Formula Three Champion; 1979	Succeeded by Stefan Johansson
Preceded by Derek Warwick; 1978 BRDC Series Champion	British Formula Three Champion; 1979	Succeeded by Stefan Johansson
Preceded by Ingo Hoffmann	Stock Car Brasil; Champion; 1999–2001	Succeeded by Ingo Hoffmann
