= Didier Pironi =

French racing driver (1952–1987)

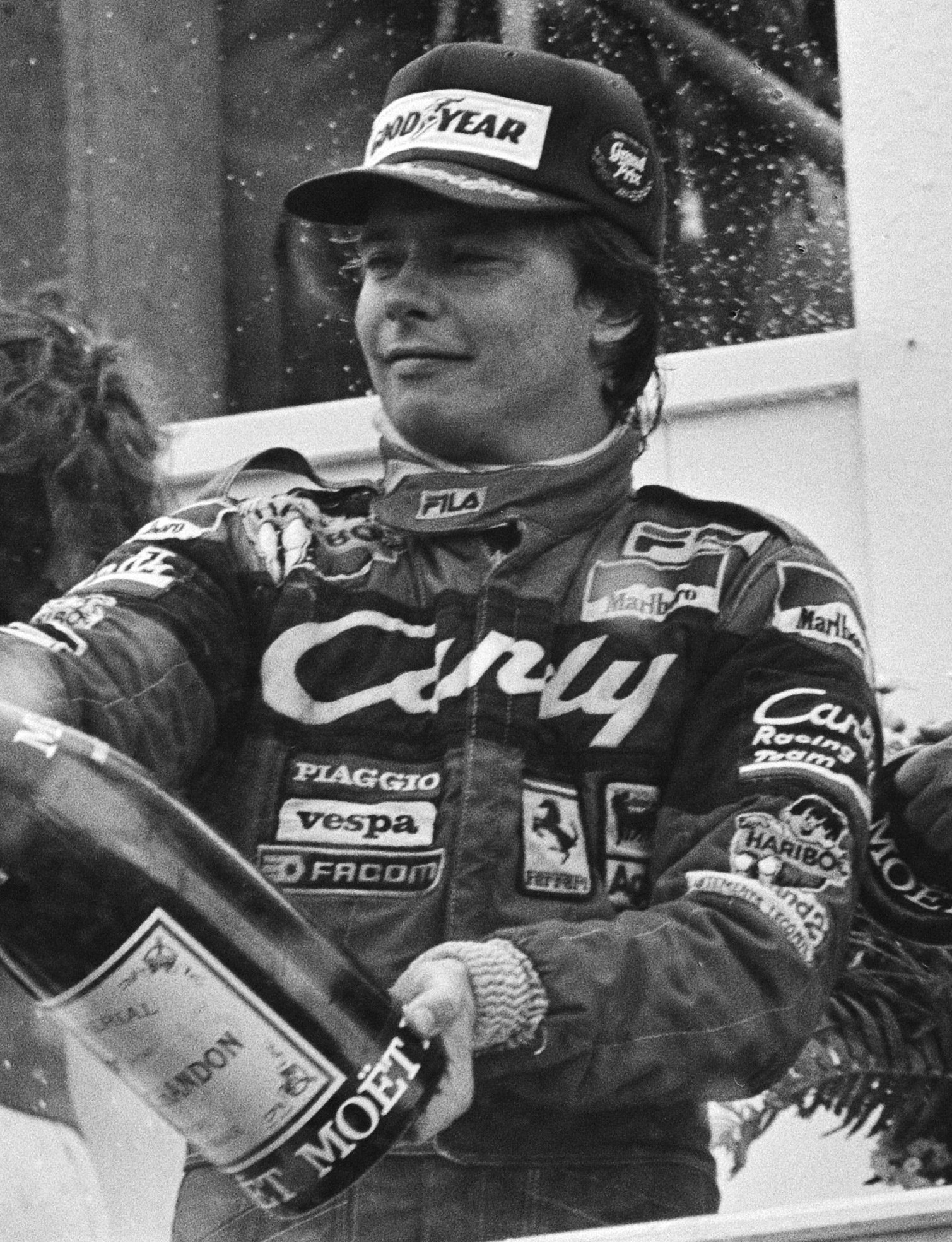
- Pironi at the 1982 Dutch Grand Prix
- Born: Didier Joseph Louis Pironi; 26 March 1952; Villecresnes, Val-de-Marne, France
- Died: 23 August 1987 (aged 35); English Channel, off the Isle of Wight, England
- Cause of death: Injuries sustained whilst offshore powerboat racing
- Children: 2
- Relatives: José Dolhem (half-brother)

Formula One World Championship career
- Nationality: (France) French
- Active years: 1978–1982
- Team(s): Tyrrell, Ligier, Ferrari
- Entries: 72 (70 starts)
- Championships: 0
- Wins: 3
- Podiums: 13
- Career points: 101
- Pole positions: 4
- Fastest laps: 5
- First entry: 1978 Argentine Grand Prix
- First win: 1980 Belgian Grand Prix
- Last win: 1982 Dutch Grand Prix
- Last entry: 1982 German Grand Prix

24 Hours of Le Mans career
- Years: 1976–1978, 1980
- Teams: Porsche, Renault, BMW
- Best finish: 1st (1978)
- Class wins: 1 (1978)

Signature
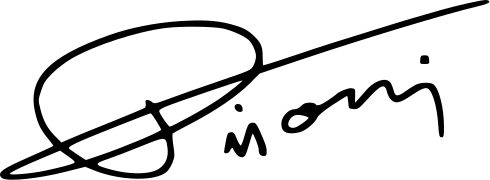

Didier Joseph Louis Pironi (26 March 1952 – 23 August 1987) was a French racing driver and offshore powerboat racer, who competed in Formula One from 1978 to 1982. Pironi was runner-up in the Formula One World Drivers' Championship in 1982 with Ferrari, and won three Grands Prix across five seasons. In endurance racing, Pironi won the 24 Hours of Le Mans in 1978 with Renault.

Born and raised in Val-de-Marne, Pironi was the half-brother of racing driver José Dolhem. After initially studying engineering, he enrolled at the Winfield Racing School at Paul Ricard, earning a scholarship to compete in Formula Renault, where he won the Eurocup in 1974 and 1976. After finishing third in the 1977 European Formula Two Championship, Pironi progressed to Formula One in 1978 with Tyrrell, making his debut at the Argentine Grand Prix. Pironi retained his seat at Tyrrell the following season, achieving his maiden podium at the Belgian Grand Prix. He moved to Ligier in 1980 to partner Jacques Laffite, taking his maiden win in Belgium—amongst several podiums—as he finished fifth in the standings.

Pironi's performances at Ligier attracted the attention of Enzo Ferrari, who signed him to Ferrari in 1981 as the teammate of Gilles Villeneuve. Whilst leading the 1982 World Drivers' Championship, having controversially won the San Marino Grand Prix amid the FISA–FOCA war, Pironi was seriously injured during qualifying for the German Grand Prix; he crashed his Ferrari 126C2 in very wet conditions, severely injuring his legs. The accident came three months after the death of Villeneuve, whose fatal crash was attributed to his rivalry with Pironi. He ultimately lost the title by five points to Keke Rosberg. He retired from racing with three wins, four pole positions, five fastest laps and 13 podiums in Formula One.

Outside of Formula One, Pironi entered four editions of the 24 Hours of Le Mans from 1976 to 1980, winning in 1978 alongside Jean-Pierre Jaussaud, driving the Renault Alpine A442B. He was also a race-winner in the BMW M1 Procar Championship. In August 1987, Pironi died in an offshore powerboat racing accident near the Isle of Wight.

== Early life ==
Pironi was born in Villecresnes, Val-de-Marne. He is the half-brother and first cousin of José Dolhem (they had the same father and their mothers were sisters). He began studying as an engineer and earned a degree in science, but entering the family construction business fell by the wayside following his enrollment at the Winfield Racing School at Paul Ricard, graduating with a prestigious Volant Shell Competition Scholarship (free one Formula France season entry) as the best student of 1972.

== Professional driving career (1972–1982) ==
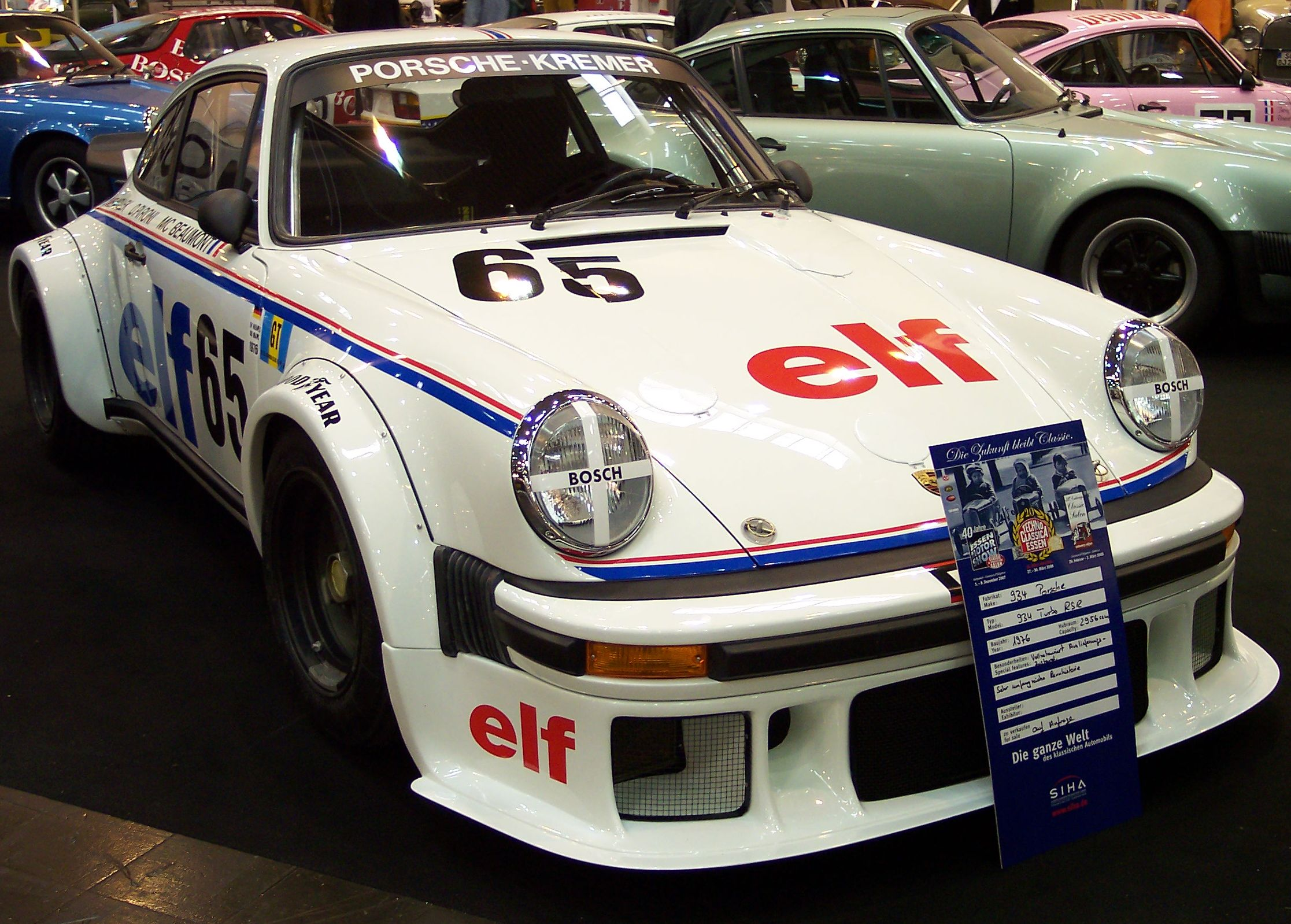
Porsche 934 Turbo (Pironi co-drove in 1976 24 Hours of Le Mans)

The program was designed to promote young motorsport talents, that also led Alain Prost, René Arnoux and Patrick Tambay into Formula One. He became Formula France champion in 1974, taking the Super Renault championship title in 1976 and winning the prestigious Monaco Grand Prix Formula Three support race in 1977.

=== Tyrrell and Ligier ===
Pironi signed with Tyrrell and made his F1 debut at the Argentine GP on 15 January 1978. Ken Tyrrell's team which, despite being British, had a strong working relationship with Elf, dating back to the late 1960s.

In the same year, Pironi was part of the massive Renault squad tasked with winning the 24 Hours of Le Mans. Partnering Jean-Pierre Jaussaud in the team's second car, the unusual "bubble roof" A442B, he won the race by four laps from the rival Porsche 936s.

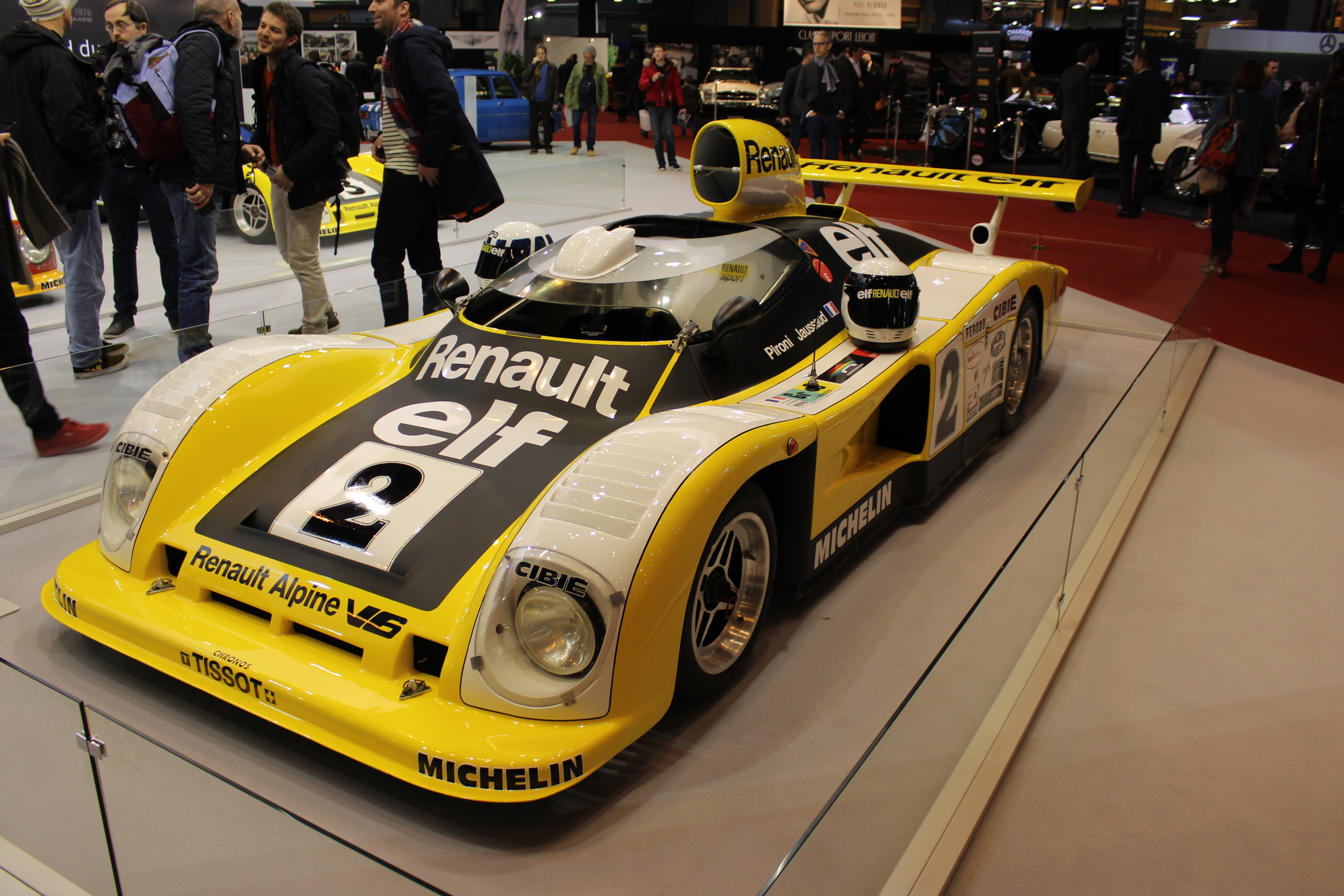
The Renault-Alpine A442B of Pironi and Jaussaud (1978 24 Hours of Le Mans Overall Victors)

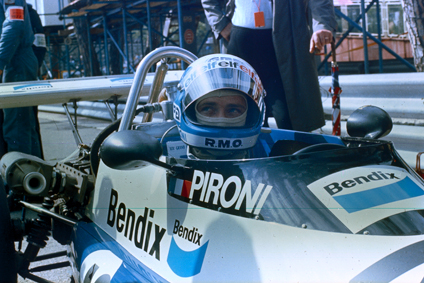
Pironi, winner of the Monaco Formula Three support race (1977)

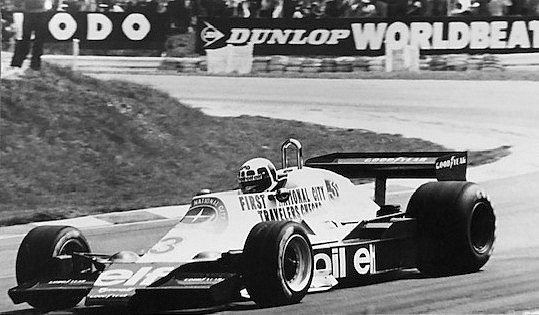
Didier Pironi driving Tyrrell 008, 1978 British Grand Prix (Brands Hatch)

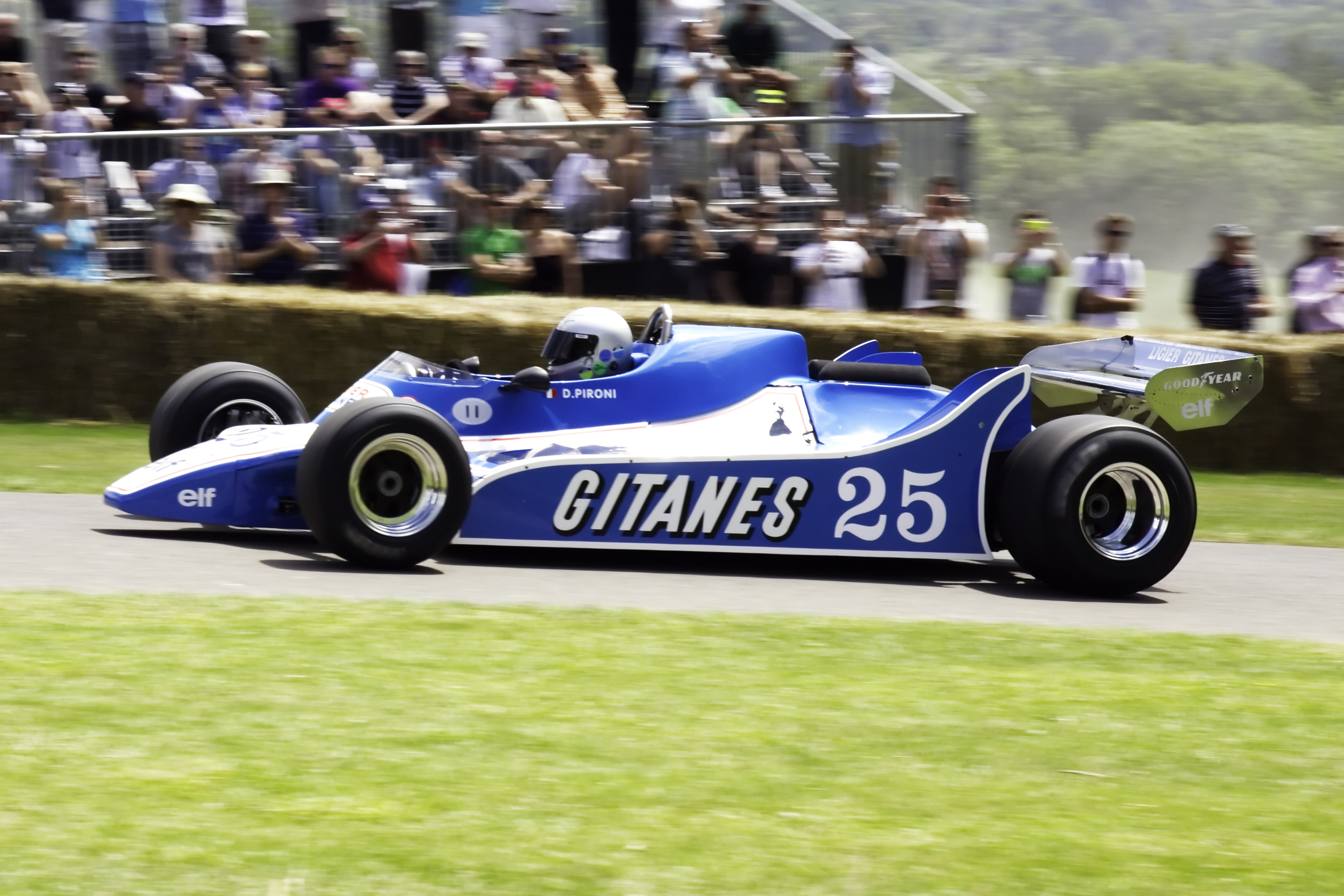
1980 Ligier JS 11/15

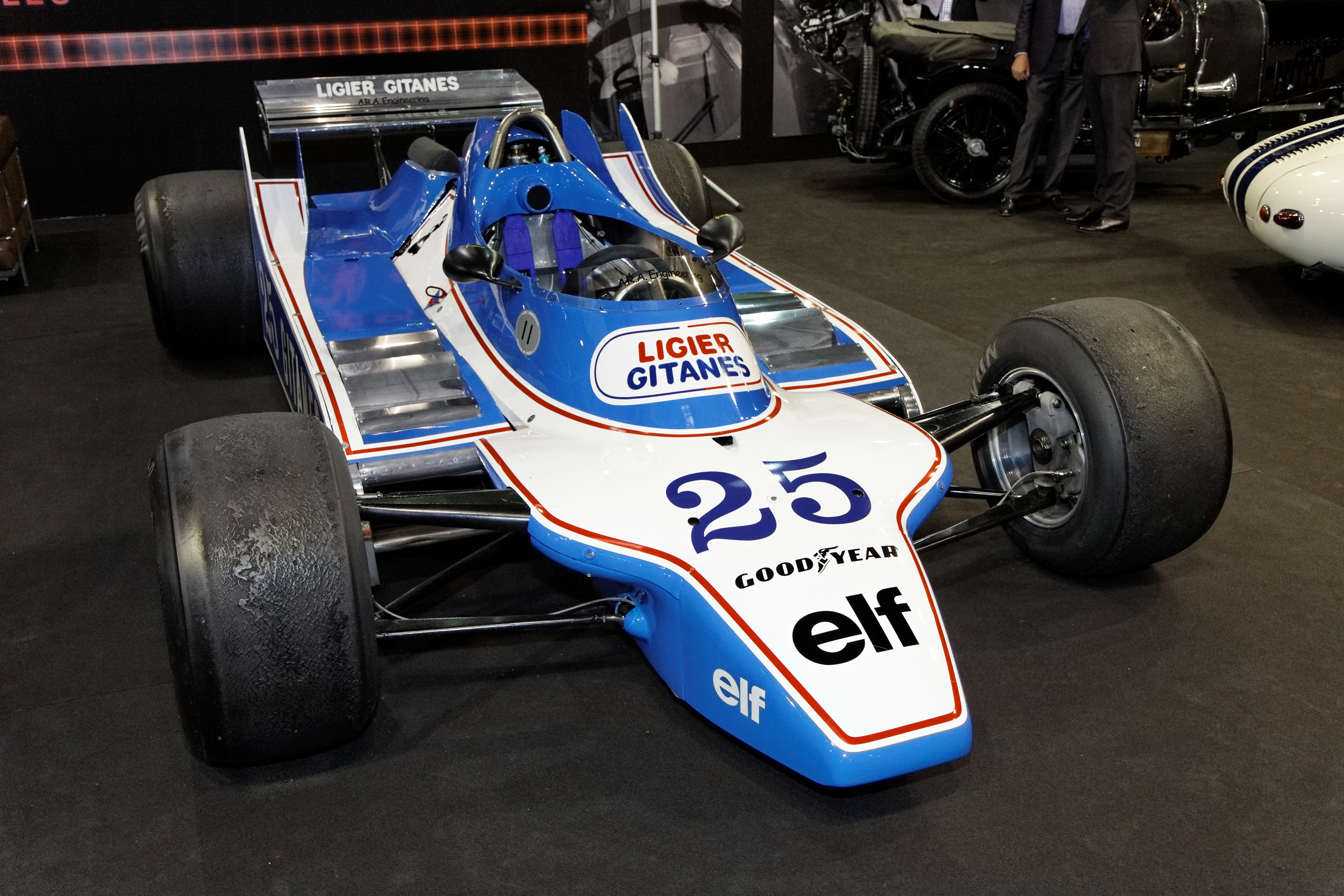
1980 Ligier JS11/15 (Paris Retromobile Exposition, 2012)

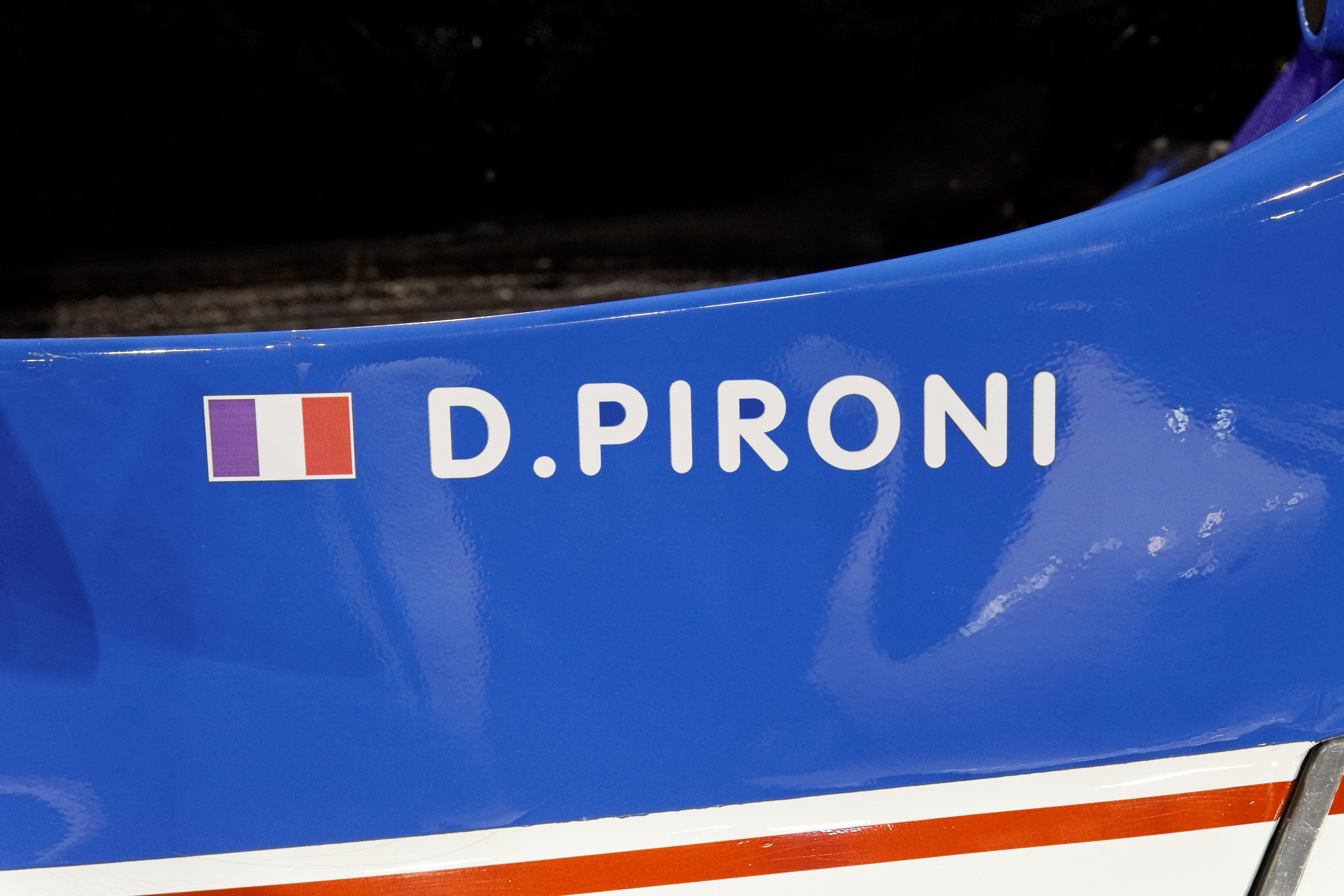
1980 Ligier JS11/15 (Side Panel)

Two seasons with the underfinanced Tyrrell team demonstrated enough promise for Guy Ligier to sign Pironi to his eponymous French team in 1980, a season in which Pironi recorded his first victory, in the Belgian Grand Prix at Zolder, as well as several podium finishes. The Ligier JS11/15 was an excellent car but was unable to reach its maximum potential. A combination of the team's incompetence and Jacques Laffite being in firm political control meant that Pironi was not going to win the championship with Ligier.

=== Ferrari ===
Pironi's performance piqued Enzo Ferrari's interest in the Frenchman's services, which he secured for 1981. Ferrari later recalled, "As soon as Pironi arrived at Maranello, he won everyone's admiration and affection, not only for his gifts as an athlete, but also for his way of doing things - he was reserved while at the same time outgoing."

Teamed and compared with Ferrari's lead driver Gilles Villeneuve, who welcomed the Frenchman and treated him as an equal, Pironi was slower in qualifying but steadier in races during his first season with Ferrari.

==== 1982 San Marino Grand Prix ====
Establishing a fine rapport with the senior members of the team, Pironi arguably exploited this good relationship in the aftermath of the controversial 1982 San Marino Grand Prix, where Pironi is widely thought to have duped Villeneuve into conceding victory by giving the impression that he would finish behind his teammate, only to unexpectedly power past him into the Tosa hairpin, despite the team having signaled both drivers to slow down. Villeneuve was furious with Pironi and vowed never to say another word to him. The Canadian was killed in qualifying two weeks later at the following Belgian Grand Prix at Zolder trying to beat Pironi's lap time. Many believe that this was foremost on Villeneuve's mind at the time of his fatal accident.

Harvey Postlethwaite (the co-designer of the 126C2) believed that the "drama" following San Marino was blown out of proportion by the press, "Villeneuve was really upset because he felt he should have been handed the race on a plate... They were competitive and either of them could win."

Pironi also mentioned a technical reason as to why the two Ferraris were swapping places so often during the San Marino race. "The (Ferrari 126C) turbo pressure was very, very difficult to control. Most of the reason that they were able to pass one another so evenly was that one would go through a sticky patch and sort of only be giving 4-bar of boost or 4.2, and the other would be getting a burst of 4.5, so it would have the legs of the other guy. It wasn't quite as spectacular as it appeared at the time."

According to Ferrari's chief mechanic Paolo Scaramelli, the team had agreed before the race that if the two Renaults were out, the drivers should have maintained position. Pironi did say a deal took place but the terms were more complex, "We had a meeting before the race; Arnoux, Prost, Gilles and me, in my motorhome. We agreed to make a spectacle for the first half of the race so long as our positions on the lap after half-distance were the same as on the grid. We started the real race at half-distance and so had plenty of fuel. The team (Ferrari) didn't know that, Marco Piccinini and Gérard Larrousse (Renault F1's team manager) didn't know, only the mechanics knew, but Prost and Arnoux - they will tell you the same." Pironi went on to add, "When I passed Villeneuve the first time, this was because he had made a mistake and had gone off the circuit. The first slow sign we got was a few laps after that, and by then we knew we had a lot of fuel left because of the way we drove the first half of the race."

In a 2002 interview with Motor Sport, Marco Piccinini supported Pironi's view, "It was a genuine misunderstanding triggered by Gilles making a mistake. He went off the circuit slightly and Didier passed. The sign was hung out because we were 1-2, not because we favored one driver over the other. We didn't favor either because it was at an early stage of the championship. We just wanted to maintain 1-2."

In 2007, former Marlboro marketing executive John Hogan (whose company sponsored Pironi in his time as a Ferrari driver) disputed the claim that Pironi had gone back on a prior arrangement with Villeneuve. He said: "I think Gilles was stunned somebody had out-driven him and that it just caught him so much by surprise."

With a fast, reliable car, Pironi appeared to be on course for being 1982 World Champion, but the Frenchman's own state of mind underwent severe stress due to several factors. Widespread antipathy by many in the F1 fraternity was directed toward him in the wake of the Zolder tragedy. There was also the rapid breakdown of his marriage to longtime girlfriend Catherine Bleynie within weeks of the ceremony taking place. He observed first hand the death of Riccardo Paletti in the 1982 Canadian Grand Prix, the young Italian rookie ploughing into Pironi's stalled Ferrari on the starting grid.

Ferrari team members are reported to have observed changes in Pironi's behaviour throughout that summer following Villeneuve's death. Shortly before the 1982 British Grand Prix, Pironi remarked "I feel I am beginning to touch the World Championship."

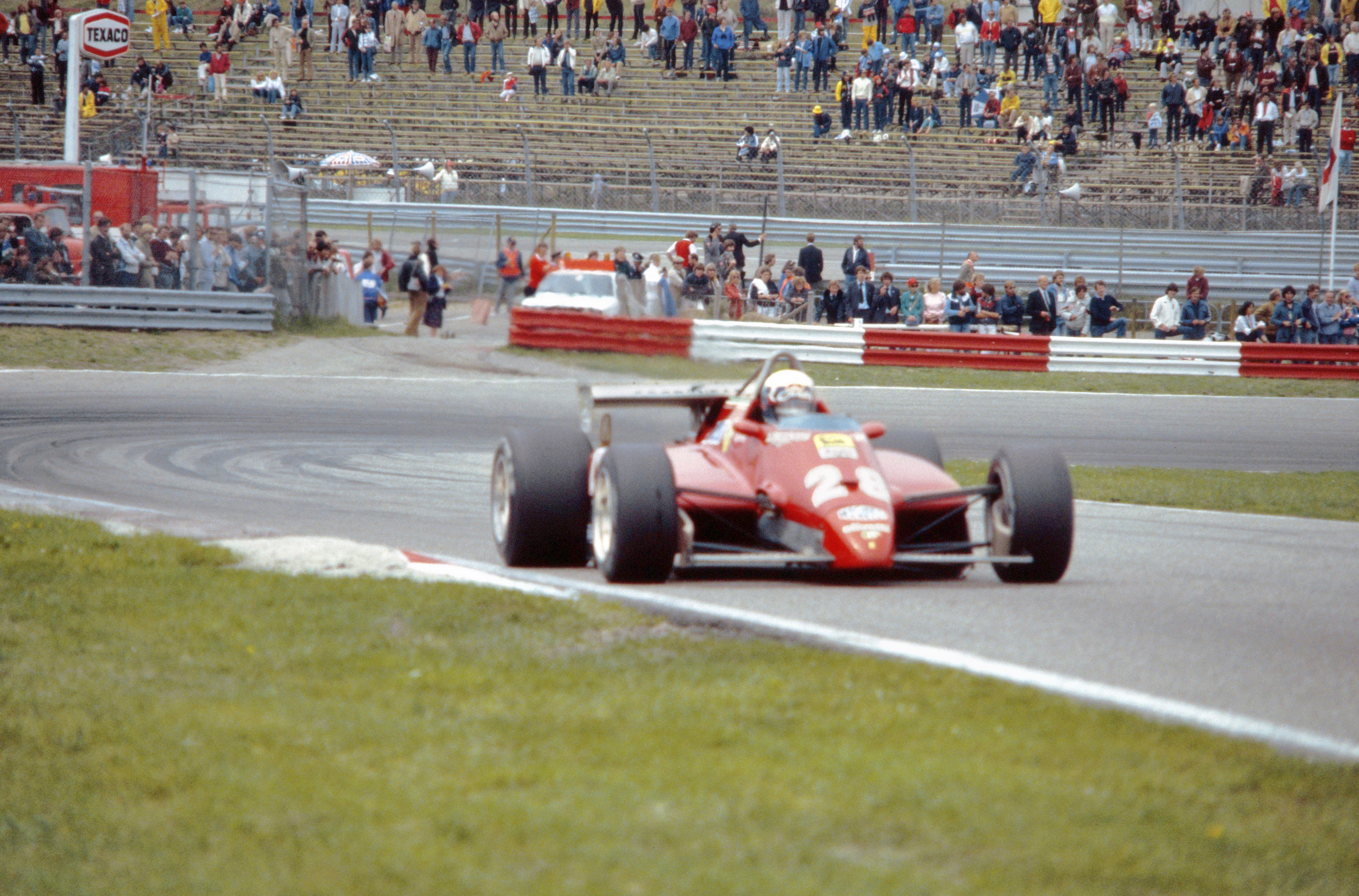
Pironi on his way to victory in the 1982 Dutch Grand Prix (Zandvoort)

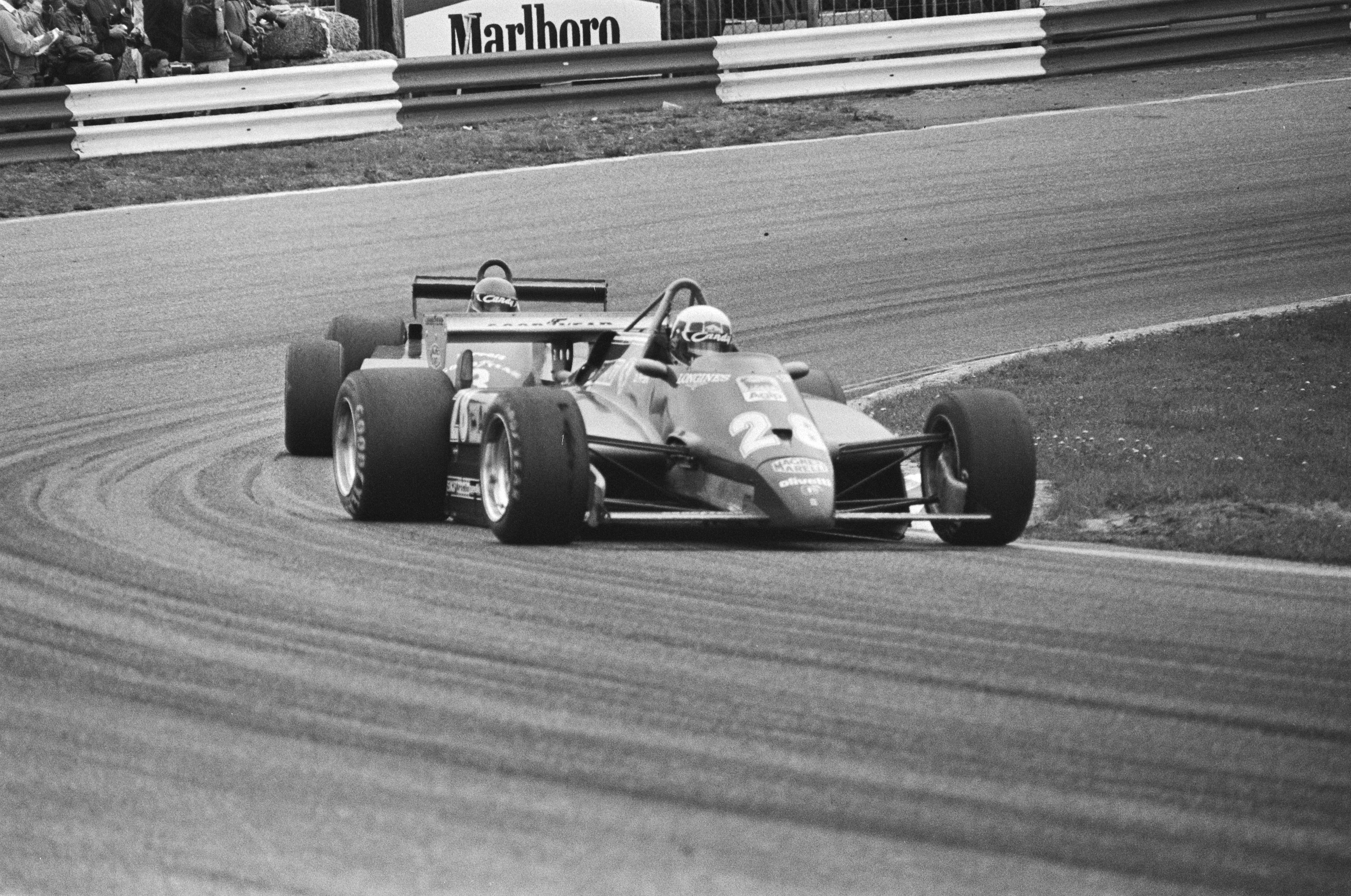
Pironi driving Ferrari 126C2, 1982

==== 1982 German Grand Prix ====
After claiming pole position for the German Grand Prix, Pironi was also busy testing a new-composition Goodyear rain tyre (under the guidance of Mauro Forghieri) in untimed practice. The "new-spec" Goodyear rain tyres proved to be very successful, with Pironi lapping up to 2.5 seconds faster than newly recruited teammate Patrick Tambay driving the sister Ferrari. (Pironi: 2 min 10.9 sec, Tambay: 2 min 13.4 sec)

Racing journalists at the circuit were quick to say Pironi was driving "like a madman." In defense of Pironi, Forghieri said that the substantial differences in the lap times between the two sets of Goodyears were no surprise to the team. The weather conditions at Hockenheim that weekend were highly uncertain; quickly alternating back and forth between wet and dry.

In the rain, one of the many problems caused by "ground effect" F1 cars was that the spray was forced out from under the side pods as a fine mist and virtually created a fog. To those behind, this made cars in front close to invisible.

When Pironi tried passing Derek Daly's Williams, the Ferrari 126C2 smashed into the back of Alain Prost's invisible Renault: a violent accident which bore some similarity to that suffered by Villeneuve. Pironi survived, but multiple fractures to both of his legs meant he never raced again in Formula 1. In the immediate aftermath of the accident, he said he felt no pain. "It was just like my accidents before, when I had no injuries. All I could think about was the car, that the spare one didn't work as well as this one, and that I would have to use it (the spare) for the race. Then I saw my legs and I thought maybe I wouldn't be doing this race, after all. In the helicopter, they began to hurt very seriously. But if I was to have this accident, it was lucky for me that it was in Germany and not in a more primitive place." The extent of Pironi's leg fractures was severe; however, contrary to Pironi's account of the accident, medics under the guidance of Professor Sid Watkins did not consider amputation in order to extricate him from the car.

At this point, Pironi was leading with 39 points in the championship, ahead of Watson (30) and Keke Rosberg (27), but Pironi was relegated to runner-up as Rosberg passed him to become World Champion. Despite missing four races of that year's fourteen, Pironi lost the title to Rosberg by just five points.

In his Formula One career, Pironi won three races, achieved 13 podiums, and scored a total of 101 championship points. He also secured four pole positions.

== Death ==
In 1986, after he was able to walk with both legs unaided, it looked as if Pironi would make a comeback when he tested for the French AGS team at Circuit Paul Ricard, and subsequently the Ligier JS27 at Dijon-Prenois. He proved that he was still fast enough to be competitive, but coming back to F1 was not truly practical due to the extent of his injuries. A return to F1 was further complicated by his insurance payout being based on the premise of sustaining career-ending injuries; Pironi would be required to pay the money back to his insurer should he return to the sport. It is believed that Pironi had reached an agreement with his insurance company to return to Formula 1 in 1988 and had signed a pre-contract with the Larrousse & Calmels team.

When it appeared that it would be impossible to return to Formula 1, Pironi decided to turn to offshore powerboat racing instead. On 23 August 1987, Pironi was killed in an accident in the Needles Trophy Race near the Isle of Wight, that also took the life of his two crew members: journalist Bernard Giroux and his old friend Jean-Claude Guénard. Their boat, Colibri 4, rode over a rough wave caused by the Esso Avon oil tanker, causing the boat to flip over. Their deaths were recorded in the town of Newport, Isle of Wight.

After Pironi's death, his girlfriend Catherine Goux gave birth to twins. In honour of Pironi and Gilles Villeneuve, she named them Didier and Gilles. In 2014, Gilles Pironi joined Mercedes AMG Petronas as an engineer. Gilles stood on the podium at the 2020 British Grand Prix, receiving the constructor's trophy.

== Biographies ==
- Lettre à Didier – Catherine Goux
- Didier: Dreams and Nightmares – Lorie Coffey, Jan Moller
- Didier Pironi: La flèche brisée (The Broken Arrow) – Martine Camus
- Pironi: The Champion Who Never Was - David Sedgwick (e-book published 31 August 2017, paperback edition published 1 January 2018)

== Racing record ==
=== Career summary ===
Season	Series	Team	Races	Wins	Poles	F/Laps	Podiums	Points	Position
1974	Formula Renault		?	?	?	?	?	?	**1st**
1976	Formula Renault		?	?	?	?	?	?	**1st**
1976	24 Hours of Le Mans	Kremer Racing	1	0	0	0	0	N/A	19th
1977	European Formula Two	Écurie Renault Elf	13	1	1	1	5	38	**3rd**
1977	British Formula Three	Écurie Elf	1	1	0	0	1	9	9th
1977	24 Hours of Le Mans	Jacky Haran / Hughes de Chaunac	1	0	0	0	0	N/A	DNF
1978	Formula One	First National City Travelers Checks Elf Team Tyrrell	16	0	0	0	0	7	15th
1978	24 Hours of Le Mans	Renault Sport	1	1	0	0	1	N/A	**1st**
1979	Formula One	Candy Tyrrell Team	10	0	0	0	2	14	10th
1979	Formula One	Team Tyrrell	5	0	0	0	0	14	10th
1979	BMW M1 Procar Championship	BMW Motorsport	3	0	0	0	2	34	8th
1980	Formula One	Équipe Ligier Gitanes	14	1	2	2	5	32	5th
1980	BMW M1 Procar	BMW Motorsport	7	1	0	0	2	34	10th
1980	World Sportscar Championship	BMW Motorsports France	2	0	0	0	0	6	NC
1981	Formula One	Ferrari	15	0	0	1	0	9	13th
1982	Formula One	Ferrari	10	2	2	2	6	39	**2nd**

=== Complete 24 Hours of Le Mans results ===
Year	Team	Co-Drivers	Car	Class	Laps	Pos.	Class Pos.
1976	(Germany) Porsche Kremer Racing	(France) Marie-Claude Charmasson (France) Bob Wollek	Porsche 934	GT	270	19th	4th
1977	(France) J. Haran de Chaunac	(France) René Arnoux (France) Guy Fréquelin	Renault Alpine A442	S 2.0	0	DNF	DNF
1978	(France) Renault Sport	(France) Jean-Pierre Jaussaud	Renault Alpine A442B	S 3.0	369	**1st**	**1st**
1980	B.M.W. France	(France) Marcel Mignot (Austria) Dieter Quester	BMW M1	IMSA	293	14th	4th

=== Complete European Formula Two Championship results ===
(key) (Races in bold indicate pole position; races in italics indicate fastest lap)

Year	Entrant	Chassis	Engine	1	2	3	4	5	6	7	8	9	10	11	12	13	Pos.	Points
1977	Écurie Renault Elf	Martini Mk 22	Renault	SIL; Ret	THR; Ret	HOC; Ret	NÜR; 4	VLL; 2	PAU; 2	MUG; Ret	ROU; 3	NOG; Ret	PER; 4	MIS; 5	**EST**; 1	DON; 3	3rd	38

=== Complete Formula One results ===
(key) (Races in bold indicate pole position; races in italics indicate fastest lap)

Year	Entrant	Chassis	Engine	1	2	3	4	5	6	7	8	9	10	11	12	13	14	15	16	WDC	Points
1978	First National City Travelers Checks Elf Team Tyrrell	Tyrrell 008	Cosworth V8	ARG; 14	BRA; 6	RSA; 6	USW; Ret	MON; 5	BEL; 6	ESP; 12	SWE; Ret	FRA; 10	GBR; Ret	GER; 5	AUT; Ret	NED; Ret	ITA; Ret	USA; 10	CAN; 7	15th	7
1979	Team Tyrrell	Tyrrell 009	Cosworth V8	ARG; Ret	BRA; 4	RSA; Ret	USW; DSQ	ESP; 6												10th	14
1979	Candy Tyrrell Team	Tyrrell 009	Cosworth V8						BEL; 3	MON; Ret	FRA; Ret	GBR; 10	GER; 9	AUT; 7	NED; Ret	ITA; 10	CAN; 5	USA; 3		10th	14
1980	Équipe Ligier Gitanes	Ligier JS11/15	Cosworth V8	ARG; Ret	BRA; 4	RSA; 3	USW; 6	BEL; 1	**MON**; Ret	FRA; 2	**GBR**; Ret	GER; Ret	AUT; Ret	NED; Ret	ITA; 6	CAN; 3	USA; 3			5th	32
1981	Ferrari	Ferrari 126CK	Ferrari V6 T	USW; Ret	BRA; Ret	ARG; Ret	SMR; 5	BEL; 8	MON; 4	ESP; 15	FRA; 5	GBR; Ret	GER; Ret	AUT; 9	NED; Ret	ITA; 5	CAN; Ret	CPL; 9		13th	9
1982	Ferrari	Ferrari 126C2	Ferrari V6 T	RSA; 18	BRA; 6	USW; Ret	SMR; 1	BEL; DNS	MON; 2	DET; 3	**CAN**; 9	NED; 1	GBR; 2	FRA; 3	**GER**; DNS	AUT	SUI	ITA	CPL	**2nd**	**39**

== See also ==
- Formula One drivers from France

== Sources ==
- Surtees, John (1992). Pirelli Album of Motor Racing Heroes. Wisconsin, USA: Motorbooks International Publishers & Wholesalers. ISBN 0-87938-671-1.
- Tremayne, David (1996). Echoes of Imola. Croydon, England, UK: MRP Limited. ISBN 1-899870-05-9.
- Moller, Jan; Coffey, Lorie (2004). Didier: Dreams and Nightmares. Balsall Common, West Midlands, England, UK: Mercian Manuals Ltd. ISBN 1-903088-16-X.
- Pritchard, Anthony (1989). Ferrari Turbos: The Grand Prix Cars, 1981-1988. UK: Aston Publications. ISBN 0-946627-50-9.
- Roebuck, Nigel (1987). Grand Prix Greats: A Personal Appreciation of 25 Famous Formula 1 Drivers. UK: Patrick Stephens. ISBN 0850597927.
- Sedgwick, David (2018). Pironi: The Champion that Never Was. Worthing, Sussex, UK: Pitch Publishing. ISBN 9781785313493.
- Donaldson, Gerald (1989). Villeneuve, The Life of the Legendary Racing Driver. Toronto, Ontario, Canada: McClelland & Stewart. ISBN 0-7710-2846-6.

Sporting positions
Preceded by Bruno Giacomelli	Monaco Formula Three; Race Winner; 1977	Succeeded by Elio de Angelis
Preceded by Jacky Ickx; Hurley Haywood; Jürgen Barth	Winner of the 24 Hours of Le Mans; 1978; With: Jean-Pierre Jaussaud	Succeeded by Klaus Ludwig; Bill Whittington; Don Whittington
