= 1982 Monaco Grand Prix =

Formula One motor race held in 1982

Coordinates: 43°44′4.74″N 7°25′16.8″E

- Race 6 of 16 in the 1982 Formula One World Championship
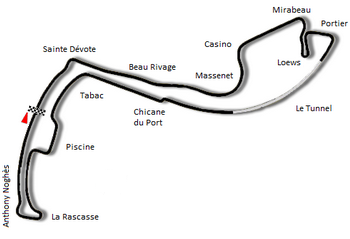

Race details
- Date: 23 May 1982
- Location: Circuit de Monaco
- Course: Street circuit
- Course length: 3.312 km (2.057 miles)
- Distance: 76 laps, 251.712 km (156.406 miles)
- Weather: Dry, then Wet

Pole position
Driver	(France) René Arnoux	Renault
- Time: 1:23.281

Fastest lap
Driver	(Italy) Riccardo Patrese	Brabham-Ford
- Time: 1:26.354 on lap 69

Podium
First	(Italy) Riccardo Patrese	Brabham-Ford
Second	(France) Didier Pironi	Ferrari
Third	(Italy) Andrea de Cesaris	Alfa Romeo

The 1982 Monaco Grand Prix was a Formula One motor race held at Monaco on 23 May 1982. It was the sixth race of the 1982 Formula One World Championship. This was the first race meeting following the death of Gilles Villeneuve at the Belgian Grand Prix qualifying two weeks previously. Consequently, Ferrari entered only one car, for Didier Pironi.

René Arnoux took pole position in his Renault and led until he spun off at the Swimming Pool on lap 15. Team-mate Alain Prost took over the lead and held it until the closing stages, when rain started to fall. On lap 74, three from the end, Prost pushed too hard and crashed into the Armco barriers coming out of the Chicane du Port (also known as the Dog Leg), handing the lead to Riccardo Patrese in the Brabham. Then, on lap 75, Patrese spun on oil at the Loews hairpin and stalled.

Pironi now led, but his battery was not charged properly before the race and the engine started misfiring on the last lap and finally stopped in the tunnel on the final lap. Andrea de Cesaris then ran out of fuel before he could pass Pironi, and Derek Daly, the next potential leader, had already lost the wings from his Williams after an accident and had also damaged his gearbox, which seized up before he could start the final lap. Patrese, who had managed to restart his car by rolling downhill and bump-starting, came through to take his first Formula One victory, with Pironi, de Cesaris and Daly classified second, third and sixth respectively. Only five cars crossed the finish line, the Lotuses of Nigel Mansell and Elio de Angelis were a lap down, fourth and fifth. Brian Henton's Tyrrell was four laps down and Marc Surer's Arrows was six laps down.

BBC commentator and 1976 world champion James Hunt commented, "Well, we've got this ridiculous situation where we're all sitting by the start-finish line waiting for a winner to come past, and we don't seem to be getting one!"

== Classification ==
=== Pre-qualifying ===
A pre-qualifying session was held because of limits on the number of cars allowed on the Monaco track at once.

Pos	No	Driver	Constructor	Time	Gap
1	31	(France) Jean-Pierre Jarier	Osella-Ford	1:29.479	—
2	17	(West Germany) Jochen Mass	March-Ford	1:29.901	+0.422
3	35	(United Kingdom) Derek Warwick	Toleman-Hart	1:30.352	+0.873
4	36	(Italy) Teo Fabi	Toleman-Hart	1:30.407	+0.928
5	32	(Italy) Riccardo Paletti	Osella-Ford	1:31.059	+1.580
6	18	(Brazil) Raul Boesel	March-Ford	1:31.212	+1.733
7	20	(Brazil) Chico Serra	Fittipaldi-Ford	1:31.471	+1.992
8	19	(Spain) Emilio de Villota	March-Ford	1:52.401	+22.922

=== Qualifying ===
Pos	No.	Driver	Constructor	Q1	Q2	Gap
1	16	(France) René Arnoux	Renault	1:24.543	1:23.281	—
2	2	(Italy) Riccardo Patrese	Brabham-Ford	1:24.929	1:23.791	+0.510
3	23	(Italy) Bruno Giacomelli	Alfa Romeo	1:26.083	1:23.939	+0.658
4	15	(France) Alain Prost	Renault	1:25.766	1:24.439	+1.158
5	28	(France) Didier Pironi	Ferrari	1:27.360	1:24.585	+1.304
6	6	(Finland) Keke Rosberg	Williams-Ford	1:25.125	1:24.649	+1.368
7	22	(Italy) Andrea de Cesaris	Alfa Romeo	1:24.928	1:25.235	+1.647
8	5	(Republic of Ireland) Derek Daly	Williams-Ford	1:25.505	1:25.390	+2.109
9	3	(Italy) Michele Alboreto	Tyrrell-Ford	1:25.840	1:25.449	+2.168
10	7	(United Kingdom) John Watson	McLaren-Ford	1:27.317	1:25.583	+2.302
11	12	(United Kingdom) Nigel Mansell	Lotus-Ford	1:26.202	1:25.642	+2.361
12	8	(Austria) Niki Lauda	McLaren-Ford	1:25.838	1:26.019	+2.557
13	1	(Brazil) Nelson Piquet	Brabham-BMW	1:26.075	1:26.120	+2.794
14	9	(West Germany) Manfred Winkelhock	ATS-Ford	1:27.952	1:26.260	+2.979
15	11	(Italy) Elio de Angelis	Lotus-Ford	1:27.568	1:26.456	+3.175
16	25	(United States) Eddie Cheever	Ligier-Matra	1:28.058	1:26.463	+3.182
17	4	(United Kingdom) Brian Henton	Tyrrell-Ford	1:28.971	1:26.690	+3.409
18	26	(France) Jacques Laffite	Ligier-Matra	1:28.353	1:27.007	+3.726
19	29	(Switzerland) Marc Surer	Arrows-Ford	1:28.380	1:27.019	+3.738
20	10	(Chile) Eliseo Salazar	ATS-Ford	1:29.574	1:27.022	+3.741
21	30	(Italy) Mauro Baldi	Arrows-Ford	1:29.306	1:27.208	+3.927
22	33	(Netherlands) Jan Lammers	Theodore-Ford	no time	1:27.523	+4.242
23	17	(West Germany) Jochen Mass	March-Ford	1:29.452	1:27.885	+4.604
24	35	(United Kingdom) Derek Warwick	Toleman-Hart	1:31.233	1:28.075	+4.794
25	31	(France) Jean-Pierre Jarier	Osella-Ford	1:29.057	1:28.264	+4.983
26	14	(Colombia) Roberto Guerrero	Ensign-Ford	1:32.183	1:28.635	+5.354

*Positions in red denote entrants that failed to qualify.

=== Race ===
Pos	No	Driver	Constructor	Tyre	Laps	Time/Retired	Grid	Points
1	2	(Italy) Riccardo Patrese	Brabham-Ford	G	76	1:54:11.259	2	9
2	28	(France) Didier Pironi	Ferrari	G	75	Battery	5	6
3	22	(Italy) Andrea de Cesaris	Alfa Romeo	M	75	Out of fuel	7	4
4	12	(United Kingdom) Nigel Mansell	Lotus-Ford	G	75	+ 1 lap	11	3
5	11	(Italy) Elio de Angelis	Lotus-Ford	G	75	+ 1 lap	15	2
6	5	(Republic of Ireland) Derek Daly	Williams-Ford	G	74	Accident/gearbox	8	1
7	15	(France) Alain Prost	Renault	M	73	Accident	4	
8	4	(United Kingdom) Brian Henton	Tyrrell-Ford	G	72	+ 4 laps	17	
9	29	(Switzerland) Marc Surer	Arrows-Ford	P	70	+ 6 laps	19	
10	3	(Italy) Michele Alboreto	Tyrrell-Ford	G	69	Suspension	9	
Ret	6	(Finland) Keke Rosberg	Williams-Ford	G	64	Collision	6	
Ret	8	(Austria) Niki Lauda	McLaren-Ford	M	56	Engine	12	
Ret	1	(Brazil) Nelson Piquet	Brabham-BMW	G	49	Turbo	13	
Ret	7	(United Kingdom) John Watson	McLaren-Ford	M	35	Electrical	10	
Ret	9	(West Germany) Manfred Winkelhock	ATS-Ford	M	31	Differential	14	
Ret	26	(France) Jacques Laffite	Ligier-Matra	M	29	Handling	18	
Ret	25	(United States) Eddie Cheever	Ligier-Matra	M	27	Oil leak	16	
Ret	10	(Chile) Eliseo Salazar	ATS-Ford	M	22	Mechanical	20	
Ret	16	(France) René Arnoux	Renault	M	14	Spun off	1	
Ret	23	(Italy) Bruno Giacomelli	Alfa Romeo	M	4	Halfshaft	3	
DNQ	30	(Italy) Mauro Baldi	Arrows-Ford	P				
DNQ	33	(Netherlands) Jan Lammers	Theodore-Ford	G				
DNQ	17	(West Germany) Jochen Mass	March-Ford	A				
DNQ	35	(United Kingdom) Derek Warwick	Toleman-Hart	P				
DNQ	31	(France) Jean-Pierre Jarier	Osella-Ford	P				
DNQ	14	(Colombia) Roberto Guerrero	Ensign-Ford	A				
DNPQ	36	(Italy) Teo Fabi	Toleman-Hart	P				
DNPQ	32	(Italy) Riccardo Paletti	Osella-Ford	P				
DNPQ	18	(Brazil) Raul Boesel	March-Ford	A				
DNPQ	20	(Brazil) Chico Serra	Fittipaldi-Ford	P				
DNPQ	19	(Spain) Emilio de Villota	March-Ford	A				

== Championship standings after the race ==
Drivers' Championship standings

Pos	Driver	Points
1	(France) Alain Prost	18
2	(United Kingdom) John Watson	17
3	(France) Didier Pironi	16
4	(Finland) Keke Rosberg	14
5	(Italy) Riccardo Patrese	13

Constructors' Championship standings

Pos	Constructor	Points
1	(United Kingdom) McLaren-Ford	29
2	(France) Renault	22
3	(Italy) Ferrari	22
4	(United Kingdom) Williams-Ford	21
5	(United Kingdom) Lotus-Ford	14

- Note: Only the top five positions are included for both sets of standings.

Previous race: 1982 Belgian Grand Prix	FIA Formula One World Championship; 1982 season	Next race: 1982 Detroit Grand Prix
Previous race: 1981 Monaco Grand Prix	Monaco Grand Prix	Next race: 1983 Monaco Grand Prix
