= 1982 Brazilian Grand Prix =

- Race 2 of 16 in the 1982 Formula One World Championship
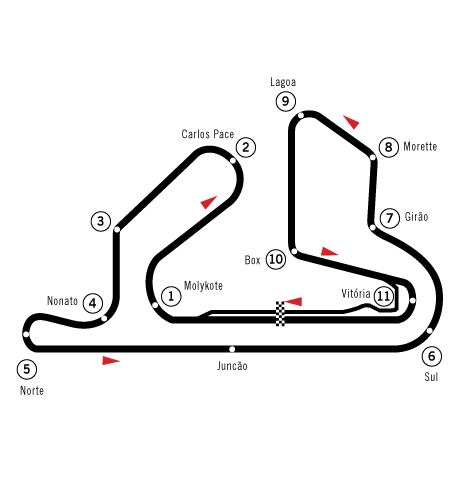

Race details
- Date: 21 March 1982
- Official name: XI Grande Prêmio do Brasil
- Location: Jacarepaguá Circuit; Jacarepaguá, Rio de Janeiro
- Course: Permanent racing facility
- Course length: 5.031 km (3.126 miles)
- Distance: 63 laps, 316.953 km (196.945 miles)
- Weather: Dry

Pole position
Driver	(France) Alain Prost	Renault
- Time: 1:28.808

Fastest lap
Driver	(France) Alain Prost	Renault
- Time: 1:37.016 on lap 36

Podium
First	(France) Alain Prost	Renault
Second	(United Kingdom) John Watson	McLaren-Ford
Third	(United Kingdom) Nigel Mansell	Lotus-Ford

The 1982 Brazilian Grand Prix was a Formula One motor race held at Jacarepaguá on 21 March 1982. It was the second race of the 1982 Formula One World Championship.

Many drivers suffered exhaustion because of the intensely hot weather, particularly Brabham drivers Nelson Piquet and Riccardo Patrese. Patrese was forced to retire from the race due to total exhaustion; Piquet, after having finished first in the race and then barely making it to the podium ceremony, fainted due to exhaustion only to be disqualified later.

== Qualifying ==
=== Pre-qualifying ===
Pos	No	Driver	Constructor	Time	Gap
1	18	(Brazil) Raul Boesel	March-Ford	1:30.038	—
2	31	(France) Jean-Pierre Jarier	Osella-Ford	1:31.293	+1.255
3	35	(United Kingdom) Derek Warwick	Toleman-Hart	1:32.995	+2.957
4	36	(Italy) Teo Fabi	Toleman-Hart	1:33.016	+2.978
5	32	(Italy) Riccardo Paletti	Osella-Ford	1:36.172	+6.134

=== Qualifying ===
Pos	No.	Driver	Constructor	Q1	Q2	Gap
1	15	(France) Alain Prost	Renault	1:28.808	1:29.120	
2	27	(Canada) Gilles Villeneuve	Ferrari	1:30.418	1:29.173	+0.365
3	6	(Finland) Keke Rosberg	Williams-Ford	1:29.910	1:29.358	+0.550
4	16	(France) René Arnoux	Renault	1:30.121	1:30.492	+1.313
5	8	(Austria) Niki Lauda	McLaren-Ford	1:30.715	1:30.152	+1.344
6	5	(Argentina) Carlos Reutemann	Williams-Ford	1:30.944	1:30.183	+1.375
7	1	(Brazil) Nelson Piquet	Brabham-Ford	1:30.281	1:30.413	+1.473
8	28	(France) Didier Pironi	Ferrari	1:30.655	1:30.905	+1.847
9	2	(Italy) Riccardo Patrese	Brabham-Ford	1:31.053	1:30.967	+2.159
10	22	(Italy) Andrea de Cesaris	Alfa Romeo	1:33.255	1:31.229	+2.421
11	11	(Italy) Elio de Angelis	Lotus-Ford	1:31.790	1:32.093	+2.982
12	7	(United Kingdom) John Watson	McLaren-Ford	1:31.906	1:32.151	+3.098
13	3	(Italy) Michele Alboreto	Tyrrell-Ford	1:32.886	1:31.991	+3.183
14	12	(United Kingdom) Nigel Mansell	Lotus-Ford	1:32.228	1:33.007	+3.420
15	9	(Germany) Manfred Winkelhock	ATS-Ford	1:32.524	no time	+3.716
16	23	(Italy) Bruno Giacomelli	Alfa Romeo	1:32.769	1:33.538	+3.961
17	18	(Brazil) Raul Boesel	March-Ford	1:35.986	1:34.050	+5.242
18	10	(Chile) Eliseo Salazar	ATS-Ford	1:34.740	1:34.262	+5.454
19	30	(Italy) Mauro Baldi	Arrows-Ford	1:35.325	1:34.380	+5.572
20	33	(Republic of Ireland) Derek Daly	Theodore-Ford	1:34.413	1:34.676	+5.605
21	4	(Sweden) Slim Borgudd	Tyrrell-Ford	1:35.020	1:35.127	+6.212
22	17	(Germany) Jochen Mass	March-Ford	1:35.039	1:35.248	+6.231
23	31	(France) Jean-Pierre Jarier	Osella-Ford	1:36.218	1:35.081	+6.273
24	26	(France) Jacques Laffite	Ligier-Matra	1:35.874	1:35.084	+6.276
25	20	(Brazil) Chico Serra	Fittipaldi-Ford	1:35.246	1:36.101	+6.438
26	25	(United States) Eddie Cheever	Ligier-Matra	1:35.612	1:35.288	+6.480
DNQ	36	(Italy) Teo Fabi	Toleman-Hart	1:36.312	1:35.326	+6.518
DNQ	14	(Colombia) Roberto Guerrero	Ensign-Ford	1:41.028	1:35.730	+6.922
DNQ	29	(United Kingdom) Brian Henton	Arrows-Ford	1:35.834	1:35.748	+6.940
DNQ	35	(United Kingdom) Derek Warwick	Toleman-Hart	1:37.223	1:36.014	+7.206

== Race ==
=== Disqualifications ===
Nelson Piquet finished first and Keke Rosberg finished second, but both were disqualified after the cars were found to be underweight. As a result, the FOCA teams boycotted San Marino two races later. The problem was with a 7 US gallons (26 L) "ballast water tank", ostensibly used to cool the brakes. This would gradually empty during the race and then be replenished at the end so as to pass post-race scrutineering. The FIA Appeals Tribunal upheld the disqualification seven weeks later and these tanks were permanently banned.

=== Race classification ===
Pos	No	Driver	Constructor	Tyre	Laps	Time/Retired	Grid	Points
1	15	(France) Alain Prost	Renault	MI	63	1:44:33.134	1	9
2	7	(United Kingdom) John Watson	McLaren-Ford	MI	63	+ 2.990	12	6
3	12	(United Kingdom) Nigel Mansell	Lotus-Ford	G	63	+ 36.859	14	4
4	3	(Italy) Michele Alboreto	Tyrrell-Ford	G	63	+ 50.761	13	3
5	9	(West Germany) Manfred Winkelhock	ATS-Ford	A	62	+ 1 Lap	15	2
6	28	(France) Didier Pironi	Ferrari	G	62	+ 1 Lap	8	1
7	4	(Sweden) Slim Borgudd	Tyrrell-Ford	G	61	+ 2 Laps	21	
8	17	(West Germany) Jochen Mass	March-Ford	P	61	+ 2 Laps	22	
9	31	(France) Jean-Pierre Jarier	Osella-Ford	P	60	+ 3 Laps	23	
10	30	(Italy) Mauro Baldi	Arrows-Ford	P	57	+ 6 Laps	19	
DSQ	1	(Brazil) Nelson Piquet	Brabham-Ford	G	63	Underweight	7	
DSQ	6	(Finland) Keke Rosberg	Williams-Ford	G	63	Underweight	3	
Ret	10	(Chile) Eliseo Salazar	ATS-Ford	A	38	Engine	18	
Ret	20	(Brazil) Chico Serra	Fittipaldi-Ford	P	36	Suspension	25	
Ret	2	(Italy) Riccardo Patrese	Brabham-Ford	G	34	Physical	9	
Ret	27	(Canada) Gilles Villeneuve	Ferrari	G	29	Accident	2	
Ret	8	(Austria) Niki Lauda	McLaren-Ford	MI	22	Collision	5	
Ret	16	(France) René Arnoux	Renault	MI	21	Collision	4	
Ret	5	(Argentina) Carlos Reutemann	Williams-Ford	G	21	Collision	6	
Ret	11	(Italy) Elio de Angelis	Lotus-Ford	G	21	Collision	11	
Ret	25	(United States) Eddie Cheever	Ligier-Matra	MI	19	Water Leak	26	
Ret	23	(Italy) Bruno Giacomelli	Alfa Romeo	MI	16	Clutch	16	
Ret	26	(France) Jacques Laffite	Ligier-Matra	MI	15	Chassis	24	
Ret	22	(Italy) Andrea de Cesaris	Alfa Romeo	MI	14	Chassis	10	
Ret	33	(Republic of Ireland) Derek Daly	Theodore-Ford	A	12	Spun Off	20	
Ret	18	(Brazil) Raul Boesel	March-Ford	P	11	Spun Off	17	
DNQ	36	(Italy) Teo Fabi	Toleman-Hart	P				
DNQ	14	(Colombia) Roberto Guerrero	Ensign-Ford	A				
DNQ	29	(United Kingdom) Brian Henton	Arrows-Ford	P				
DNQ	35	(United Kingdom) Derek Warwick	Toleman-Hart	P				
DNPQ	32	(Italy) Riccardo Paletti	Osella-Ford	P				

== Notes ==
- This was the 200th Grand Prix in which an Argentinian driver participated. In those 200 races, Argentinian drivers had won 38 Grands Prix, achieved 100 podium finishes, 38 pole positions, 33 fastest laps, 10 Grand Slams and 5 World Championships.
- This was the 10th fastest lap and the 1st Grand Slam for Renault and a Renault-powered car.

== Championship standings after the race ==
Drivers' Championship standings

Pos	Driver	Points
1	(France) Alain Prost	18
2	(United Kingdom) John Watson	7
3	(Argentina) Carlos Reutemann	6
4	(France) René Arnoux	4
5	(United Kingdom) Nigel Mansell	4

Constructors' Championship standings

Pos	Constructor	Points
1	(France) Renault	22
2	(United Kingdom) McLaren-Ford	10
3	(United Kingdom) Williams-Ford	8
4	(United Kingdom) Lotus-Ford	4
5	(United Kingdom) Tyrrell-Ford	3

- Note: Only the top five positions are included for both sets of standings.

Previous race: 1982 South African Grand Prix	FIA Formula One World Championship; 1982 season	Next race: 1982 United States Grand Prix West
Previous race: 1981 Brazilian Grand Prix	Brazilian Grand Prix	Next race: 1983 Brazilian Grand Prix
