= 1982 United States Grand Prix West =

- Race 3 of 16 in the 1982 Formula One World Championship
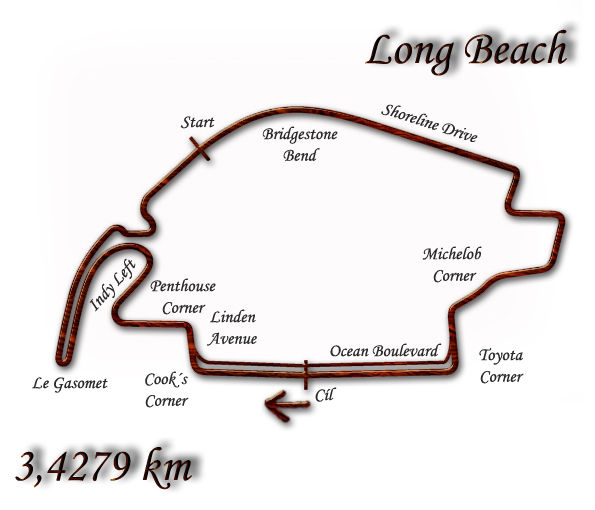

Race details
- Date: April 4, 1982
- Official name: Toyota Grand Prix of Long Beach
- Location: Long Beach Street Circuit
- Course: Temporary street course
- Course length: 3.428 km (2.13 miles)
- Distance: 75.5 laps, 258.814 km (160.82 miles)
- Weather: Clear and warm with temperatures reaching up to 63.9 °F (17.7 °C); wind speeds approaching speeds up to 11.8 miles per hour (19.0 km/h)

Pole position
| Driver | (Italy) Andrea de Cesaris | Alfa Romeo |
- Time: 1:27.316

Fastest lap
| Driver | (Austria) Niki Lauda | McLaren-Ford |
- Time: 1:30.831 on lap 12

Podium
| First | (Austria) Niki Lauda | McLaren-Ford |
| Second | (Finland) Keke Rosberg | Williams-Ford |
| Third | (Italy) Riccardo Patrese | Brabham-Ford |

The 1982 United States Grand Prix West (officially the Toyota Grand Prix of Long Beach) was a Formula One motor race held on April 4, 1982, at the temporary street circuit at Long Beach Street Circuit. It was the third race of the 1982 Formula One World Championship.

== Summary ==
In his third race since returning from a self-imposed two-year "retirement," Austrian Niki Lauda won the seventh United States Grand Prix West at Long Beach, ahead of Keke Rosberg. It was the 18th victory of Lauda's career, and his first for McLaren. Canada's Gilles Villeneuve crossed the line in third, but he was disqualified after the race when a protest of his Ferrari's rear wing was upheld by the officials.

Just five days after the previous race in Brazil, Carlos Reutemann had shocked his boss Frank Williams, and everyone else in the paddock, by announcing his retirement. When former World Champion (for Williams) Alan Jones insisted he was not available, Williams contacted another former Champion, American Mario Andretti. His commitment to the Patrick Indy racing team posed no conflicts, so he agreed to drive the second Williams for the weekend, saying, "I had nothing else to do, so I accepted."

Significant changes had been made to the course since the previous year's race. The Queen's Hairpin at the end of Shoreline Drive had been transformed into a right-angle turn that led into a new section of track with several demanding corners, leading up to Ocean Boulevard. On the other end of the course, the short straight at the bottom of the hill from Linden Avenue had been lengthened and a chicane had been inserted near the beginning of the curving Shoreline Drive "straight," in anticipation of the pits being moved there from Ocean Boulevard. The changes increased the length of the lap only slightly, but added about ten seconds to the previous year's times as the drivers became acclimated to the new layout.

In Saturday's qualifying, the cars running on Michelin tires had a decided advantage over the Goodyear teams, though the Michelin men had all learned from Lauda's times on Friday that their harder race tires were faster than the qualifiers. Seeing this development, Lauda intentionally used only one set and kept a brand new set for Sunday's race. Lauda topped the charts through almost the entire session, but, after crashing into a wall early on, Andrea de Cesaris threw his Alfa Romeo around in 1:27.316 to beat Lauda's time by .12 of a second, three minutes before the session ended. It was the Italian's first pole position (his only pole in 208 career starts), and he was ecstatic. At the time, de Cesaris was the youngest driver to achieve pole position, a record beaten by Rubens Barrichello at the 1994 Belgian Grand Prix. Lauda, meanwhile, knew he had a fresh set of rubber for the race, while de Cesaris did not. Defending World Champion Nelson Piquet was the fastest Goodyear runner, in sixth position on the grid. The two American drivers were together in Row 7 as Eddie Cheever recovered from an early collision with the wall to put his Talbot Ligier in the thirteenth spot, while Andretti was still getting used to the Williams and ended up alongside Cheever in fourteenth.

Sunday was clear, warm and gorgeous with a crowd of 82,000. As the cars formed on the grid for the start, Lotus driver Elio de Angelis lined up on the wrong side (he claimed he was waved into the wrong place). He quickly backed out of the spot, bumping his teammate Nigel Mansell behind him. When Mansell put his car into reverse, thinking that de Angelis was coming back further, the green light came on. As a result, Mansell claims to be the only driver to have started a race in reverse. Everyone got away cleanly, though Mansell found himself near the back of the field. At the front, de Cesaris made an excellent start, jumping into the lead ahead of Lauda and René Arnoux.

At the end of the first lap, de Cesaris led by two seconds, followed by Arnoux, Lauda, Bruno Giacomelli, Villeneuve, Alain Prost, Didier Pironi, Rosberg, Piquet, Michele Alboreto, John Watson, Cheever and Andretti. On lap six, with the Italian beginning to stretch his lead slightly, his Alfa Romeo teammate Giacomelli closed up on Lauda, who was right behind Arnoux. As the three cars approached the hairpin, Giacomelli made a run down the outside of Lauda, locked up his brakes and slid into the back of Arnoux's Renault. Both cars were out, and de Cesaris now led Lauda by 5.7 seconds, with Villeneuve in third. Prost hit the inside wall whilst under braking for the right hander at the end of Ocean Boulevard and was immediately out.

Lauda now began to cut into de Cesaris' lead, setting the race's fastest lap in the process. On lap 15, de Cesaris was held up by Raul Boesel's March in the chicane entering Shoreline Drive as he came up to lap him. This gave Lauda the momentum he needed to sweep by into the lead at the end of the straight, and the Austrian immediately began to pull away.

At the same time, Rosberg and Villeneuve were in the middle of a smashing battle over fourth place, behind John Watson. Over several laps, Rosberg closed the gap to Villeneuve until, on lap 19, he was right on the Ferrari's tail. On the next lap, the Williams edged briefly ahead between the hairpin and the new chicane, but the Ferrari's horsepower advantage allowed Villeneuve to retake the position down the Shoreline Drive straight. Rosberg repeated his pass in the same spot on the following lap, and this time was able to fight off Villeneuve's attempt to outbrake him into the right-hander at the end of the straight. Villeneuve, in fact, overshot the corner and slid up the escape road. Piquet was just about to slip by when Villeneuve jumped back on the track in front of him and salvaged his hold on fifth place.

Meanwhile, Andretti had advanced from fourteenth on the grid to ninth in the second Williams, with a best lap faster than teammate Rosberg's. On lap 19, however, he lost it in the "marbles" of tire rubber that were collecting off-line and damaged his suspension against the wall in Turn 4. Rosberg continued, his eyes now on Watson's McLaren. Watson had jumped from eleventh on the grid to third in just eight laps, taking advantage of the softer Michelin tire compound he had chosen. For six laps, the two cars were nose to tail, until Watson had to give way on lap 27 as his softer tires went off. Rosberg quickly pulled away and Watson stopped for new rubber just two laps later.

Around lap 23, the new parts of the track began to break up and 4 cars spun off and crashed over the next 4 laps. First Daly, then Piquet, Laffite and Guerrero. At the front, Lauda suddenly increased his lead over de Cesaris from five seconds to 10 around lap 30, when the Alfa developed brake trouble. Apparently content now with second place, but possibly distracted by smoke from an engine fire, the Italian lost concentration and shockingly flew off the road into the Turn Five wall on lap 34, ripping off two wheels and the right sidepod. This left Lauda almost a full minute ahead of Rosberg, with only Villeneuve, Alboreto and Cheever also on the lead lap.

After a tire stop, Cheever retired from a fine drive in the Talbot Ligier with gearbox failure. On lap 59, Riccardo Patrese took fourth from Alboreto, who was struggling with damage from a battle with Villeneuve. This became third in the books when the stewards accepted Tyrrell's protest of Ferrari's staggered, two-part rear wing, aimed at circumventing the 110 cm limit on its width, and Villeneuve was disqualified.

Lauda came home nearly 15 seconds ahead for his second win in the United States, along with the 1975 Watkins Glen race, and Rosberg secured a fine second place. For the first time (and the last until 2023), this would be one of three American races in the same season, with the inaugural Detroit race and the Championship clincher in Las Vegas still to come.

== Classification ==
=== Pre-qualifying ===
| Pos | No | Driver | Constructor | Time |
|---|---|---|---|---|
| | 18 | (Brazil) Raul Boesel | March-Ford | unknown |
| | 31 | (France) Jean-Pierre Jarier | Osella-Ford | unknown |
| | 32 | (Italy) Riccardo Paletti | Osella-Ford | unknown |
| | 36 | (Italy) Teo Fabi | Toleman-Hart | unknown |
| 5 | 35 | (United Kingdom) Derek Warwick | Toleman-Hart | 1:37.264 |

=== Qualifying ===
| Pos | No. | Driver | Constructor | Q1 | Q2 | Gap |
|---|---|---|---|---|---|---|
| 1 | 22 | (Italy) Andrea de Cesaris | Alfa Romeo | 1:31.095 | 1:27.316 | |
| 2 | 8 | (Austria) Niki Lauda | McLaren-Ford | 1:28.791 | 1:27.436 | +0.120 |
| 3 | 16 | (France) René Arnoux | Renault | 1:31.159 | 1:27.763 | +0.447 |
| 4 | 15 | (France) Alain Prost | Renault | 1:29.935 | 1:27.979 | +0.663 |
| 5 | 23 | (Italy) Bruno Giacomelli | Alfa Romeo | 1:30.669 | 1:28.087 | +0.771 |
| 6 | 1 | (Brazil) Nelson Piquet | Brabham-Ford | 1:29.934 | 1:28.276 | +0.960 |
| 7 | 27 | (Canada) Gilles Villeneuve | Ferrari | 1:29.949 | 1:28.476 | +1.160 |
| 8 | 6 | (Finland) Keke Rosberg | Williams-Ford | 1:28.576 | 1:29.042 | +1.260 |
| 9 | 28 | (France) Didier Pironi | Ferrari | 1:30.125 | 1:28.680 | +1.364 |
| 10 | 31 | (France) Jean-Pierre Jarier | Osella-Ford | 1:31.383 | 1:28.708 | +1.392 |
| 11 | 7 | (United Kingdom) John Watson | McLaren-Ford | 1:32.900 | 1:28.885 | +1.569 |
| 12 | 3 | (Italy) Michele Alboreto | Tyrrell-Ford | 1:31.084 | 1:29.027 | +1.711 |
| 13 | 25 | (United States) Eddie Cheever | Ligier-Matra | 1:31.802 | 1:29.336 | +2.020 |
| 14 | 5 | (United States) Mario Andretti | Williams-Ford | 1:31.190 | 1:29.468 | +2.152 |
| 15 | 26 | (France) Jacques Laffite | Ligier-Matra | 1:31.432 | 1:29.587 | +2.271 |
| 16 | 11 | (Italy) Elio de Angelis | Lotus-Ford | 1:30.565 | 1:29.694 | +2.378 |
| 17 | 12 | (United Kingdom) Nigel Mansell | Lotus-Ford | 1:30.117 | 1:29.758 | +2.442 |
| 18 | 2 | (Italy) Riccardo Patrese | Brabham-Ford | 1:30.281 | 1:29.984 | +2.632 |
| 19 | 14 | (Colombia) Roberto Guerrero | Ensign-Ford | 1:31.806 | 1:30.186 | +2.870 |
| 20 | 29 | (United Kingdom) Brian Henton | Arrows-Ford | 1:32.607 | 1:30.474 | +3.158 |
| 21 | 17 | (West Germany) Jochen Mass | March-Ford | 1:31.808 | 1:30.476 | +3.160 |
| 22 | 33 | (Republic of Ireland) Derek Daly | Theodore-Ford | 1:32.502 | 1:30.919 | +3.603 |
| 23 | 18 | (Brazil) Raul Boesel | March-Ford | 1:32.277 | 1:30.977 | +3.661 |
| 24 | 4 | (Sweden) Slim Borgudd | Tyrrell-Ford | 1:31.768 | 1:31.033 | +3.717 |
| 25 | 9 | (West Germany) Manfred Winkelhock | ATS-Ford | 1:31.593 | 1:31.602 | +4.277 |
| 26 | 10 | (Chile) Eliseo Salazar | ATS-Ford | 1:33.663 | 1:31.825 | +4.509 |
| 27 | 36 | (Italy) Teo Fabi | Toleman-Hart | 1:34.024 | 1:31.988 | +4.672 |
| 28 | 32 | (Italy) Riccardo Paletti | Osella-Ford | 1:33.289 | 1:32.146 | +4.830 |
| 29 | 20 | (Brazil) Chico Serra | Fittipaldi-Ford | 1:32.496 | 1:32.510 | +5.180 |
| 30 | 30 | (Italy) Mauro Baldi | Arrows-Ford | 1:33.701 | 1:34.320 | +6.385 |

=== Race ===
| Pos | No | Driver | Constructor | Tyre | Laps | Time/Retired | Grid | Points |
|---|---|---|---|---|---|---|---|---|
| 1 | 8 | (Austria) Niki Lauda | McLaren-Ford | MI | 75 | 1:58:25.318 | 2 | 9 |
| 2 | 6 | (Finland) Keke Rosberg | Williams-Ford | G | 75 | + 14.660 | 8 | 6 |
| 3 | 2 | (Italy) Riccardo Patrese | Brabham-Ford | G | 75 | + 1:19.143 | 18 | 4 |
| 4 | 3 | (Italy) Michele Alboreto | Tyrrell-Ford | G | 75 | + 1:20.947 | 12 | 3 |
| 5 | 11 | (Italy) Elio de Angelis | Lotus-Ford | G | 74 | + 1 Lap | 16 | 2 |
| 6 | 7 | (United Kingdom) John Watson | McLaren-Ford | MI | 74 | + 1 Lap | 11 | 1 |
| 7 | 12 | (United Kingdom) Nigel Mansell | Lotus-Ford | G | 73 | + 2 Laps | 17 | |
| 8 | 17 | (West Germany) Jochen Mass | March-Ford | P | 73 | + 2 Laps | 21 | |
| 9 | 18 | (Brazil) Raul Boesel | March-Ford | P | 70 | + 5 Laps | 23 | |
| 10 | 4 | (Sweden) Slim Borgudd | Tyrrell-Ford | G | 68 | + 7 Laps | 24 | |
| DSQ | 27 | (Canada) Gilles Villeneuve | Ferrari | G | 75 | Illegal Rear Wing | 7 | |
| Ret | 25 | (United States) Eddie Cheever | Ligier-Matra | MI | 59 | Gearbox | 13 | |
| Ret | 22 | (Italy) Andrea de Cesaris | Alfa Romeo | MI | 33 | Spun Off | 1 | |
| Ret | 29 | (United Kingdom) Brian Henton | Arrows-Ford | P | 32 | Spun Off | 20 | |
| Ret | 14 | (Colombia) Roberto Guerrero | Ensign-Ford | A | 27 | Spun Off | 19 | |
| Ret | 26 | (France) Jacques Laffite | Ligier-Matra | MI | 26 | Spun Off | 15 | |
| Ret | 31 | (France) Jean-Pierre Jarier | Osella-Ford | P | 26 | Transmission | 10 | |
| Ret | 1 | (Brazil) Nelson Piquet | Brabham-Ford | G | 25 | Spun Off | 6 | |
| Ret | 33 | (Republic of Ireland) Derek Daly | Theodore-Ford | A | 23 | Spun Off | 22 | |
| Ret | 5 | (United States) Mario Andretti | Williams-Ford | G | 19 | Collision | 14 | |
| Ret | 15 | (France) Alain Prost | Renault | MI | 10 | Spun Off | 4 | |
| Ret | 28 | (France) Didier Pironi | Ferrari | G | 6 | Spun Off | 9 | |
| Ret | 16 | (France) René Arnoux | Renault | MI | 5 | Collision | 3 | |
| Ret | 23 | (Italy) Bruno Giacomelli | Alfa Romeo | MI | 5 | Collision | 5 | |
| Ret | 10 | (Chile) Eliseo Salazar | ATS-Ford | A | 3 | Collision | 26 | |
| Ret | 9 | (West Germany) Manfred Winkelhock | ATS-Ford | A | 1 | Collision | 25 | |
| DNQ | 36 | (Italy) Teo Fabi | Toleman-Hart | P | | | | |
| DNQ | 32 | (Italy) Riccardo Paletti | Osella-Ford | P | | | | |
| DNQ | 20 | (Brazil) Chico Serra | Fittipaldi-Ford | P | | | | |
| DNQ | 30 | (Italy) Mauro Baldi | Arrows-Ford | P | | | | |
| DNPQ | 35 | (United Kingdom) Derek Warwick | Toleman-Hart | P | | | | |

== Notes ==
- This was the 25th pole position for an Italian driver.
- This was the 1st Grand Prix start for a Colombian driver.
- This race marked the 100th podium finish for Brabham.
- This was the 4th United States Grand Prix West win for a Ford-powered car. It broke the previous record set by Ferrari at the 1979 United States Grand Prix West.

== Championship standings after the race ==
Drivers' Championship standings

| Pos | Driver | Points |
|---|---|---|
| 1 | (France) Alain Prost | 18 |
| 2 | (Austria) Niki Lauda | 12 |
| 3 | (Finland) Keke Rosberg | 8 |
| 4 | (United Kingdom) John Watson | 8 |
| 5 | (Argentina) Carlos Reutemann | 6 |

Constructors' Championship standings

| Pos | Constructor | Points |
|---|---|---|
| 1 | (France) Renault | 22 |
| 2 | (United Kingdom) McLaren-Ford | 20 |
| 3 | (United Kingdom) Williams-Ford | 14 |
| 4 | (United Kingdom) Lotus-Ford | 6 |
| 5 | (United Kingdom) Tyrrell-Ford | 6 |

- Note: Only the top five positions are included for both sets of standings.

| Previous race: 1982 Brazilian Grand Prix | FIA Formula One World Championship; 1982 season | Next race: 1982 San Marino Grand Prix |
| Previous race: 1981 United States Grand Prix West | United States Grand Prix West | Next race: 1983 United States Grand Prix West |

| Preceded by 1981 United States Grand Prix West | Grand Prix of Long Beach | Succeeded by 1983 United States Grand Prix West |
