= Riccardo Paletti =

Italian racing driver (1958–1982)

- Paletti during the San Marino GP, 25 April 1982
- Born: 15 June 1958; Milan, Italy
- Died: 13 June 1982 (aged 23); Montreal, Quebec, Canada

Formula One World Championship career
- Nationality: (Italy) Italian
- Active years: 1982
- Team: Osella
- Entries: 8 (2 starts)
- Championships: 0
- Wins: 0
- Podiums: 0
- Career points: 0
- Pole positions: 0
- Fastest laps: 0
- First entry: 1982 South African Grand Prix
- Last entry: 1982 Canadian Grand Prix

Riccardo Paletti (15 June 1958 – 13 June 1982) was an Italian motor racing driver. Paletti was killed when he crashed on the start grid in his second Formula One start.

== Life before racing ==
Born in Milan, Riccardo Paletti was the son of Gianna and Arietto Paletti, a Milanese entrepreneur who had built his fortune as a real estate developer, and amongst a number of business interests was the importer for Pioneer audio equipment in Italy.

Paletti's early sporting interests were broad; he was Italian junior karate champion at thirteen, and was in contention for a place on the Italian national alpine skiing youth team.

== Racing before Formula One ==
In 1978, Paletti entered nine races in Formula Super Ford, and in his inaugural race he led for 18 laps. Although he did not win during the first season, he took two second places and finished third in the overall championship. During the end of his first season, he also made his Formula 3 debut in the Italian Championship with a March-Toyota. In 1979, Paletti entered a full F3 championship season, but his best placings were two fifth-place finishes. Later the same year, he competed in a few Formula 2 races for the first time with the team run by Mike Earle. His best result was at Misano, where he finished eighth.

For the 1981 European F2 championship season, Earle severed his collaboration with March to start with Onyx. Paletti tested extensively during the winter, and the effort paid off during the opening rounds of the season, as he qualified tenth in the first race at Silverstone, before finishing second behind Mike Thackwell. He retired in the second round at Hockenheim but set the fastest lap of the race, and his good form continued in round three at Thruxton, where he finished third — this time behind Roberto Guerrero. At that point, he was joint second in the championship with Stefan Johansson, trailing Thackwell by three points. But from then, his results declined, and he finished tenth in the championship.

== Formula One career ==
Although still on a learning curve in the lower class racing, Paletti decided to join the uncompetitive team Osella in 1982. He admitted that Formula One struck him with a little bit of fear, but his sponsor, Pioneer, wanted him to move up and Paletti did not want to miss his opportunity. His teammate was the experienced Frenchman driver Jean-Pierre Jarier. He travelled with a personal medical adviser who was monitoring his blood pressure and heartbeat with small sensors attached to his body during testing and practice sessions. His diet was constantly adapted to the results. Few Formula One drivers took this professional approach seriously at the time.

Making his first attempt during the South African Grand Prix in January 1982, Jarier managed to haul his Osella to qualify in the last position on the grid, but Paletti was almost two seconds slower, failing to qualify.

For the second round of the season, at the Jacarepaguá circuit near Rio de Janeiro, the venue for the Brazilian Grand Prix, Paletti had to prequalify on Friday morning, but a wheel fell off the Osella after a suspension failure and again he did not make the grid.

The next round of the championship was the US GP West at the street circuit of Long Beach. Jarier found the right set-up for the Osella and managed to put the car in the top ten during qualifying. Paletti was a massive three and a half seconds slower and failed to qualify again.

For the fourth Grand Prix of the season, at Imola on 25 April, amidst a war between the FISA and FOCA, only 14 cars loyal to the organisation started the race. Paletti had managed to beat the ATS of Eliseo Salazar and was supposed to start from the back of the grid. However, on Sunday afternoon Paletti's Osella failed to fire up for the warm-up lap and by the time he had left the pits the other cars were already lining up for the start. As a result, the moment he crossed the starting line he was already 49 seconds behind. He never got close to the rest of the field and after seven laps he had to park his car due to another suspension failure.

At Zolder, Paletti failed to prequalify on Friday, becoming increasingly disappointed with the Osella. The new chassis, which was to be introduced at Monaco, gave some promise, but still Paletti knew that qualifying for Monaco was virtually impossible with only twenty entries allowed to start in the narrow streets of the principality. There was only one new monocoque for Jarier and the new rear suspension was delayed. Once again, Paletti failed to prequalify.

On his seventh Grand Prix, in Detroit, Paletti was much closer to Jarier's pace and, although the gap was still over a second, he qualified right behind his teammate. However, during the warm-up session, Paletti lost a wheel at the beginning. The mechanics tried to repair the car in time for the race and, while there still was the possibility of starting the race in the spare car, that option fell through after Jarier's fire extinguisher had gone off accidentally. Jarier took the spare car. This meant it would be a race against time for Paletti's mechanics to set up the car and they were still busy when the rest of the field progressed to the grid. But just as the work was finished, with Paletti ready to get in the car, news broke that Jarier had hit the wall, damaged his car and was on his way back to the pits. So Paletti's car was ready for Jarier to jump in and start the race from the pit lane, leaving Paletti behind as a spectator once more.

== Death ==
Paletti qualified for the Canadian Grand Prix on Sunday 13 June 1982, the first time he would start successfully in a full line-up. At the start, the lights took an unusually long time to turn to green. During this time, Didier Pironi, who had the pole position, stalled the engine of his Ferrari. Pironi lifted his hand to signal the problem just as the lights switched to green, which was too late to abort the start. The other cars swerved across the track, trying to squeeze past Pironi's stationary car. Raul Boesel just clipped the back left of the Ferrari, spinning his March into the path of Eliseo Salazar and Jochen Mass. Salazar, Boesel and Mass suffered minor impacts but it looked as if everyone had passed the Ferrari without serious consequences. However, Paletti could not react in time and slammed into the rear of the stranded Ferrari at 180 km/h (110 mph), catapulting it into the path of Geoff Lees. The Osella's nose was crushed heavily.

Due to the force of the severe impact, Paletti sustained heavy chest injuries and was lying unconscious in his car, wedged against the steering wheel. Sid Watkins, the FIA's head doctor, was on the scene to stabilise and assist Paletti. As Watkins climbed over the wreckage of the Osella, the petrol from the fuel tank ignited, enveloping the car in a wall of fire. When the fire was finally put out, the injured Paletti was without a pulse. It took the rescue workers 25 minutes to cut him out safely from his wrecked car, as the sparks caused by the cutting equipment threatened to re-ignite the petrol on the track. He was flown by a medical helicopter to the Royal Victoria Hospital, where he died soon after arriving. His mother was watching from the stands, where they were to celebrate his 24th birthday later that week. Paletti suffered a torn aorta as well as fractures to both legs. According to track doctor Jacques Bouchard, his pupils were already dilated when medical personnel arrived and that the extended extraction time made no difference to his chances of survival.

Paletti was the second Formula One driver to die during the 1982 season. Five weeks earlier, Gilles Villeneuve had a fatal crash during qualifying for the Belgian Grand Prix at Zolder. Paletti was the last Formula One driver to die in a race until the 1994 San Marino Grand Prix, which saw the death of Roland Ratzenberger during qualifying and of three-time world champion Ayrton Senna during the race itself. In 1986, Elio de Angelis was killed during testing at Circuit Paul Ricard three days after the 1986 Monaco Grand Prix, but the test was not part of a Grand Prix.

In tribute to Paletti, the racetrack at Varano de' Melegari, in the province of Parma (northern Italy) is now called the Autodromo Riccardo Paletti. There is also a side altar in the Church of Santa Maria al Carrobiolo, Monza dedicated to his memory, in the Chapel of the Crucifix.

Paletti is buried at the Cimitero Maggiore di Milano.

In July 1982, the Italy national football team dedicated their World Cup victory to Villeneuve and Paletti, and collectively held a banner with their dedication on the field after defeating West Germany in the final, which read "Villeneuve, Paletti... Corriamo insieme, il terzo titolo è nostro!" (lit. 'Villeneuve, Paletti... We speed together, the third title is ours!').

== Racing record ==
=== Complete European Formula Two Championship results ===
(key) (Races in bold indicate pole position; races in italics indicate fastest lap)

Year	Entrant	Chassis	Engine	1	2	3	4	5	6	7	8	9	10	11	12	Pos.	Pts
1979		March 792	BMW	SIL	HOC	THR	NÜR	VAL	MUG	PAU	HOC	ZAN	PER	MIS; Ret	DON	NC	0
1980	Mike Earle Racing with March	March 802	BMW	THR	HOC	NÜR	VAL	PAU	SIL	ZOL	MUG; Ret	ZAN; 14	PER	MIS; 8	HOC; Ret	NC	0
1981	Onyx Racing	March 812	BMW	SIL; 2	HOC; Ret	THR; 3	NÜR; Ret	VAL; 6	MUG; 10	PAU; Ret	PER; Ret	SPA; 15	DON; Ret	MIS; Ret	MAN; Ret	10th	11

=== Complete Formula One results ===
(key)

Year	Entrant	Chassis	Engine	1	2	3	4	5	6	7	8	9	10	11	12	13	14	15	16	WDC	Pts.
1982	Osella Squadra Corse	Osella FA1C	Cosworth V8	RSA; DNQ	BRA; DNPQ	USW; DNQ	SMR; Ret	BEL; DNPQ	MON; DNPQ	DET; DNS	CAN; Ret	NED	GBR	FRA	GER	AUT	SUI	ITA	CPL	NC	0

Preceded by Gilles Villeneuve	Formula One fatal accidents 13 June 1982	Succeeded by Elio de Angelis
