= 1982 San Marino Grand Prix =

- Race 4 of 16 in the 1982 Formula One World Championship
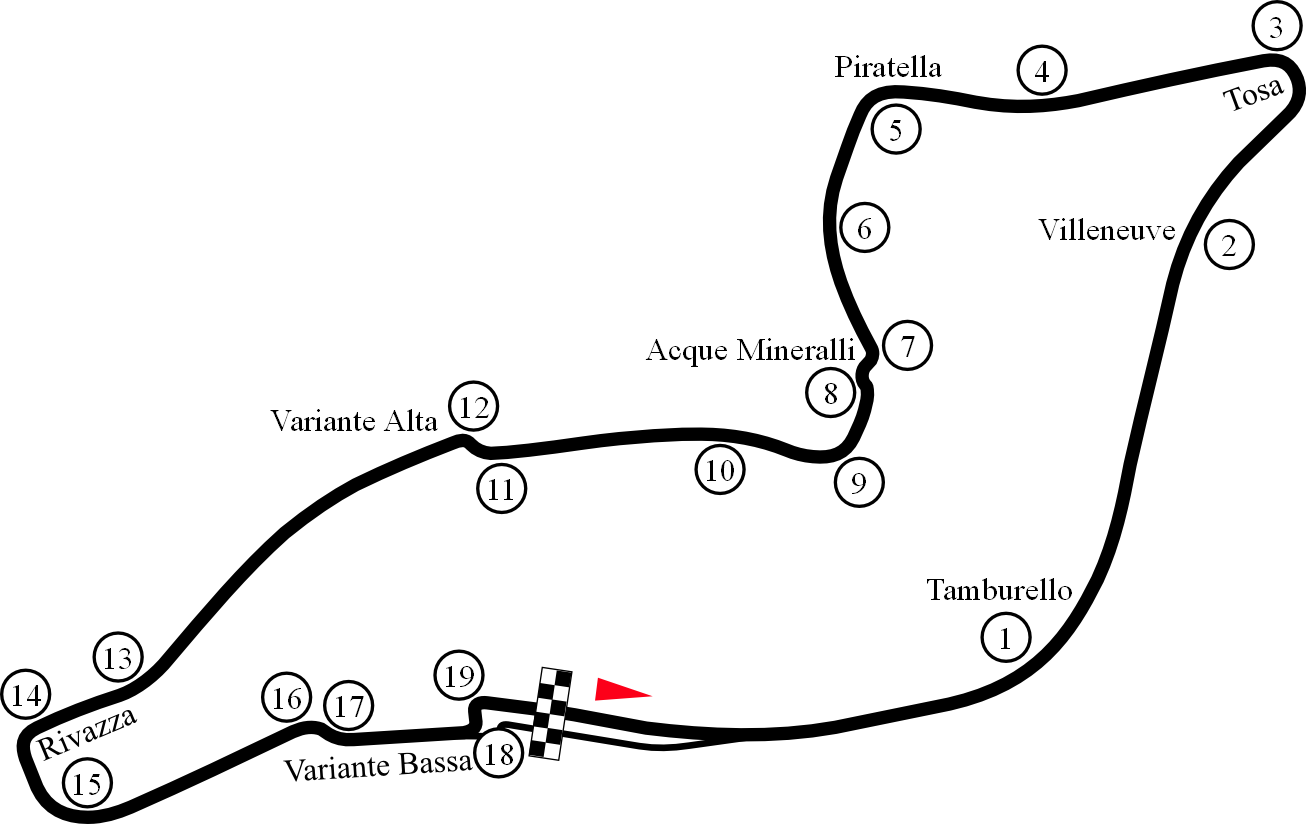

Race details
- Date: 25 April 1982
- Official name: 2º Gran Premio di San Marino
- Location: Autodromo Dino Ferrari; Imola, Emilia-Romagna, Italy
- Course: Permanent racing facility
- Course length: 5.040 km (3.132 miles)
- Distance: 60 laps, 302.400 km (187.902 miles)

Pole position
Driver	(France) René Arnoux	Renault
- Time: 1:29.765

Fastest lap
Driver	(France) Didier Pironi	Ferrari
- Time: 1:35.036 on lap 44

Podium
First	(France) Didier Pironi	Ferrari
Second	(Canada) Gilles Villeneuve	Ferrari
Third	(Italy) Michele Alboreto	Tyrrell-Ford

The 1982 San Marino Grand Prix was a Formula One motor race held on 25 April 1982 at the Autodromo Dino Ferrari, Imola, Italy. It was the fourth race of the 1982 Formula One World Championship. The race was boycotted by many teams as part of a political war, unrelated to the event itself, involving the two dominant forces within Formula One, the Fédération Internationale du Sport Automobile (FISA) and the Formula One Constructors' Association (FOCA). Only seven teams took part, giving a field of 14 cars.

The 60-lap race was won by Frenchman Didier Pironi, driving a Ferrari, with Canadian teammate Gilles Villeneuve second and Italian Michele Alboreto third in a Tyrrell-Ford. After the Renaults of René Arnoux and Alain Prost retired, Villeneuve led from Pironi before the Ferrari team ordered both drivers to slow down, with Alboreto far behind. Villeneuve interpreted this as an order to maintain position on the track; Pironi did not and thus overtook Villeneuve on the final lap, infuriating the Canadian to the point that he vowed never to speak to Pironi again. Villeneuve would lose his life in a crash during qualifying for the Belgian Grand Prix two weeks later.

== Summary ==
In a decision relating to the 1982 Brazilian Grand Prix, Nelson Piquet and Keke Rosberg were excluded for their cars' use of water tanks as ballast to keep them under the weight limit during race conditions. The Formula One Constructors' Association (FOCA) protested, and decided to boycott the 1982 San Marino Grand Prix.

Most of the FOCA-aligned teams, including Brabham, McLaren, Williams and Lotus, boycotted the race. However, the Tyrrell, Osella, ATS and Toleman teams broke the boycott, citing "sponsor obligations". They joined the FISA-aligned Ferrari, Renault and Alfa Romeo teams in the race, sporting a total of 14 cars.

The Renaults of René Arnoux and Alain Prost qualified first and second, but their cars failed in the race, leaving Ferrari occupying the top two positions with Gilles Villeneuve leading Didier Pironi. The third-placed Tyrrell of Michele Alboreto was far behind, so Ferrari ordered their drivers to slow down to minimize the risk of mechanical failure or running out of fuel. Villeneuve believed this order also meant that the cars were to maintain position on the track, with Villeneuve ahead of Pironi. However, Pironi believed that the cars were free to race, and passed Villeneuve. Villeneuve believed that Pironi was simply trying to spice up an otherwise dull race, and duly re-passed his teammate, assuming that he would then hold station for the remainder of the race. Thus, Villeneuve failed to protect the inside line going into the Tosa corner on the final lap, and Pironi passed him to take the win. Villeneuve was irate at what he saw as Pironi's betrayal, although opinion inside the Ferrari team was split over the true meaning of the order to slow down. Villeneuve's expression was sullen on the podium, enraged by Pironi's actions. He was quoted afterwards as saying, "I'll never speak to Pironi again in my life." They proved to be prophetic words, as he was still not on speaking terms with his teammate when he died during qualifying for the Belgian Grand Prix two weeks later. Pironi's pass on Villeneuve is considered to be one of the most controversial moments in Formula One.

Manfred Winkelhock was disqualified for his ATS-Ford car being underweight in post-race scrutineering.

Despite most of the FOCA-aligned teams boycotting the race it still counted towards the World Championship. This was a bone of contention with the FOCA teams as two previous races held during the "war" (the 1980 Spanish Grand Prix and the 1981 South African Grand Prix) which had seen all three manufacturer teams boycotting had been down-graded to non-championship races and had not counted towards the championship or official records.

== Classification ==
=== Qualifying ===
Pos	No.	Driver	Constructor	Q1	Q2	Gap
1	16	(France) René Arnoux	Renault	1:32.628	1:29.765	—
2	15	(France) Alain Prost	Renault	1:31.169	1:30.249	+ 0.484
3	27	(Canada) Gilles Villeneuve	Ferrari	1:31.541	1:30.717	+ 0.952
4	28	(France) Didier Pironi	Ferrari	1:32.020	1:32.779	+ 2.255
5	3	(Italy) Michele Alboreto	Tyrrell-Ford	1:34.480	1:33.209	+ 3.444
6	23	(Italy) Bruno Giacomelli	Alfa Romeo	1:35.214	1:33.230	+ 3.465
7	22	(Italy) Andrea de Cesaris	Alfa Romeo	1:33.879	1:33.397	+ 3.632
8	35	(United Kingdom) Derek Warwick	Toleman-Hart	1:34.062	1:33.503	+ 3.738
9	31	(France) Jean-Pierre Jarier	Osella-Ford	1:34.715	1:34.336	+ 4.571
10	36	(Italy) Teo Fabi	Toleman-Hart	1:42.529	1:34.647	+ 4.882
11	4	(United Kingdom) Brian Henton	Tyrrell-Ford	1:36.100	1:35.262	+ 5.497
12	9	(West Germany) Manfred Winkelhock	ATS-Ford	1:36.155	1:35.790	+ 6.025
13	32	(Italy) Riccardo Paletti	Osella-Ford	1:37.999	1:36.228	+ 6.463
14	10	(Chile) Eliseo Salazar	ATS-Ford	1:41.255	1:36.434	+ 6.669

=== Race ===
Pos	No	Driver	Constructor	Tyre	Laps	Time/Retired	Grid	Points
1	28	(France) Didier Pironi	Ferrari	G	60	1:36:38.887	4	9
2	27	(Canada) Gilles Villeneuve	Ferrari	G	60	+0.366	3	6
3	3	(Italy) Michele Alboreto	Tyrrell-Ford	G	60	+1:07.684	5	4
4	31	(France) Jean-Pierre Jarier	Osella-Ford	P	59	+1 lap	9	3
5	10	(Chile) Eliseo Salazar	ATS-Ford	A	57	+3 laps	14	2
DSQ	9	(West Germany) Manfred Winkelhock	ATS-Ford	A	54	Underweight	12	
NC	36	(Italy) Teo Fabi	Toleman-Hart	P	52	+8 laps	10	
Ret	16	(France) René Arnoux	Renault	MI	44	Turbo	1	
Ret	23	(Italy) Bruno Giacomelli	Alfa Romeo	MI	24	Engine	6	
Ret	32	(Italy) Riccardo Paletti	Osella-Ford	P	7	Suspension	13	
Ret	15	(France) Alain Prost	Renault	MI	6	Engine	2	
Ret	22	(Italy) Andrea de Cesaris	Alfa Romeo	MI	4	Electrical	7	
Ret	4	(United Kingdom) Brian Henton	Tyrrell-Ford	G	0	Transmission	11	
Ret	35	(United Kingdom) Derek Warwick	Toleman-Hart	P	0	Electrical	8	

== Championship standings after the race ==
Drivers' Championship standings

Pos	Driver	Points
1	(France) Alain Prost	18
2	(Austria) Niki Lauda	12
3	(France) Didier Pironi	10
4	(Italy) Michele Alboreto	10
5	(Finland) Keke Rosberg	8

Constructors' Championship standings

Pos	Constructor	Points
1	(France) Renault	22
2	(United Kingdom) McLaren-Ford	20
3	(Italy) Ferrari	16
4	(United Kingdom) Williams-Ford	14
5	(United Kingdom) Tyrrell-Ford	10

- Note: Only the top five positions are included for both sets of standings.

Previous race: 1982 United States Grand Prix West	FIA Formula One World Championship; 1982 season	Next race: 1982 Belgian Grand Prix
Previous race: 1981 San Marino Grand Prix	San Marino Grand Prix	Next race: 1983 San Marino Grand Prix
