= 1982 Belgian Grand Prix =

- Race 5 of 16 in the 1982 Formula One World Championship

Race details
- Date: 9 May 1982
- Official name: XL Grote Prijs van België
- Location: Circuit Zolder; Heusden-Zolder, Limburg, Belgium
- Course: Permanent racing facility
- Course length: 4.262 km (2.648 miles)
- Distance: 70 laps, 298.340 km (185.380 miles)
- Weather: Cold with air temperatures reaching up to 13 °C (55 °F)

Pole position
Driver	(France) Alain Prost	Renault
- Time: 1:15.701

Fastest lap
Driver	(United Kingdom) John Watson	McLaren-Ford
- Time: 1:20.214 on lap 67

Podium
First	(United Kingdom) John Watson	McLaren-Ford
Second	(Finland) Keke Rosberg	Williams-Ford
Third	(United States) Eddie Cheever	Ligier-Matra

The 1982 Belgian Grand Prix was a Formula One motor race held at Zolder on 9 May 1982. It was the fifth race of the 1982 Formula One World Championship.

The race was heavily overshadowed by the death of Canadian driver Gilles Villeneuve, after he crashed his Ferrari heavily during qualifying. The Ferrari team withdrew from the race as a consequence.

The 70-lap race was won by John Watson, driving a McLaren-Ford. Keke Rosberg finished second in a Williams-Ford, with Eddie Cheever third in a Ligier-Matra after Watson's teammate Niki Lauda was disqualified when his car was found to be underweight.

== Qualifying and death of Gilles Villeneuve ==
Gilles Villeneuve was killed in an accident during the final qualifying session. At the time of the crash, his teammate Didier Pironi had set a time 0.1s faster than Villeneuve for sixth place. Contemporary and more recent writers say that he was attempting to improve his time on his final lap. Some suggest that he was specifically aiming to beat Pironi due to bitterness at being passed by him two weeks earlier in the closing stages of the San Marino Grand Prix, when Villeneuve believed Pironi had been ordered to remain behind him. Villeneuve's biographer Gerald Donaldson quotes Ferrari race engineer Mauro Forghieri as saying that the Canadian, although pressing on in his usual fashion, was returning to the pits on his last set of qualifying tyres when the accident occurred. If so, he would not have set a time on that lap.

With eight minutes of the session left, Villeneuve came over the rise after the first chicane and found Jochen Mass in the March travelling much more slowly through Butte, the left-handed bend before the Terlamenbocht corner. Mass saw Villeneuve approaching at high speed and moved to the right to let him through on the racing line. At the same instant Villeneuve also moved right to pass Mass. The Ferrari hit the back of the March and was launched into the air at a speed estimated at 200–225 km/h (120–140 mph). It was airborne for over 100 metres before nosediving into the ground and disintegrating as it somersaulted along the edge of the track. Villeneuve, still strapped to his seat but without his helmet, was thrown a further 50 metres from the wreckage into the catch fencing on the outside edge of Terlamenbocht.

Several drivers stopped and rushed to the scene. John Watson and Derek Warwick pulled Villeneuve, his face blue, from the catch fencing. The first doctor arrived on the scene within 35 seconds to find that Villeneuve was not breathing, although his pulse continued throughout; he was intubated and ventilated before being transferred to the circuit medical centre and then by helicopter to University St Raphael Hospital where a fatal fracture of the neck was diagnosed as well as a cut spinal cord. Villeneuve was kept alive on life support while his wife travelled to the hospital and the doctors consulted with specialists worldwide. He died at 21:12 that evening.

The Ferrari team withdrew from the race after the accident and left the circuit. The final eight minutes of the qualifying were run after the crash debris had been removed. No drivers improved their times, leaving the Renaults of Alain Prost and René Arnoux on the front row of the grid.

== Abbreviated race summary ==
John Watson won the race after taking the lead on the penultimate lap from Keke Rosberg, who was struggling on worn tires. Niki Lauda finished third on the road but was disqualified when his car was found to be underweight in post-race scrutineering, and so the final podium place went to Eddie Cheever. The final point also went to Chico Serra, in what would turn out to be not only Serra's lone point in Formula 1, but also the final point the Fittipaldi team would score in Formula 1.

== Classification ==
=== Pre-Qualifying ===
Pos	No	Driver	Constructor	Time	Gap
1	18	(Brazil) Raul Boesel	March-Ford	1:18.333	—
2	31	(France) Jean-Pierre Jarier	Osella-Ford	1:19.999	+1.666
3	35	(United Kingdom) Derek Warwick	Toleman-Hart	1:20.847	+2.514
4	36	(Italy) Teo Fabi	Toleman-Hart	1:21.499	+3.166
5	32	(Italy) Riccardo Paletti	Osella-Ford	1:21.784	+3.451
6	19	(Spain) Emilio de Villota	March-Ford	1:22.879	+4.546

=== Qualifying ===
Pos	No.	Driver	Constructor	Q1	Q2	Gap
1	15	(France) Alain Prost	Renault	1:15.962	1:15.701	
2	16	(France) René Arnoux	Renault	1:15.903	1:15.730	+0.029
3	6	(Finland) Keke Rosberg	Williams-Ford	1:17.654	1:15.847	+0.146
4	8	(Austria) Niki Lauda	McLaren-Ford	1:17.577	1:16:049	+0.348
5	3	(Italy) Michele Alboreto	Tyrrell-Ford	1:17.344	1:16:308	+0.607
6	28	(France) Didier Pironi	Ferrari	1:18.796	1:16:501	+0.800
7	22	(Italy) Andrea de Cesaris	Alfa Romeo	1:17.696	1:16:575	+0.874
8	27	(Canada) Gilles Villeneuve	Ferrari	1:17.507	1:16:616	+0.915
9	12	(United Kingdom) Nigel Mansell	Lotus-Ford	1:17.614	1:16:944	+1.243
10	1	(Brazil) Nelson Piquet	Brabham-BMW	1:17.124	1:17.535	+1.423
11	2	(Italy) Riccardo Patrese	Brabham-BMW	1:18.366	1:17.126	+1.425
12	7	(United Kingdom) John Watson	McLaren-Ford	1:18.639	1:17.144	+1.443
13	11	(Italy) Elio de Angelis	Lotus-Ford	1:18.655	1:17.762	+2.061
14	9	(West Germany) Manfred Winkelhock	ATS-Ford	1:19.430	1:17.879	+2.178
15	5	(Republic of Ireland) Derek Daly	Williams-Ford	1:18.194	1:18.591	+2.493
16	25	(United States) Eddie Cheever	Ligier-Matra	1:20.182	1:18.301	+2.600
17	23	(Italy) Bruno Giacomelli	Alfa Romeo	1:18.425	1:18.371	+2.670
18	31	(France) Jean-Pierre Jarier	Osella-Ford	1:20.056	1:18.403	+2.702
19	26	(France) Jacques Laffite	Ligier-Matra	1:19.403	1:18.565	+2.864
20	10	(Chile) Eliseo Salazar	ATS-Ford	1:20.440	1:18.967	+3.266
21	35	(United Kingdom) Derek Warwick	Toleman-Hart	1:20.594	1:18.985	+3.284
22	4	(United Kingdom) Brian Henton	Tyrrell-Ford	1:20.518	1:19.150	+3.449
23	36	(Italy) Teo Fabi	Toleman-Hart	1:20.541	1:19.300	+3.599
24	29	(Switzerland) Marc Surer	Arrows-Ford	1:22.512	1:19.584	+3.883
25	20	(Brazil) Chico Serra	Fittipaldi-Ford	1:21.775	1:19.598	+3.897
26	18	(Brazil) Raul Boesel	March-Ford	1:20.522	1:19.621	+3.920
27	17	(West Germany) Jochen Mass	March-Ford	1:20.552	1:19.777	+4.076
28	30	(Italy) Mauro Baldi	Arrows-Ford	1:20.802	1:19.815	+4.114
29	14	(Colombia) Roberto Guerrero	Ensign-Ford	1:20.116	1:20.482	+4.415
30	33	(Netherlands) Jan Lammers	Theodore-Ford	1:21.453	1:20.584	+4.883

=== Race ===
Pos	No	Driver	Constructor	Tyre	Laps	Time/Retired	Grid	Points
1	7	(United Kingdom) John Watson	McLaren-Ford	MI	70	1:35:41.995	10	9
2	6	(Finland) Keke Rosberg	Williams-Ford	G	70	+ 7.268	3	6
3	25	(United States) Eddie Cheever	Ligier-Matra	MI	69	+ 1 Lap	14	4
4	11	(Italy) Elio de Angelis	Lotus-Ford	G	68	+ 2 Laps	11	3
5	1	(Brazil) Nelson Piquet	Brabham-BMW	G	67	+ 3 Laps	8	2
6	20	(Brazil) Chico Serra	Fittipaldi-Ford	P	67	+ 3 Laps	23	1
7	29	(Switzerland) Marc Surer	Arrows-Ford	P	66	+ 4 Laps	22	
8	18	(Brazil) Raul Boesel	March-Ford	P	66	+ 4 Laps	24	
9	26	(France) Jacques Laffite	Ligier-Matra	MI	66	+ 4 Laps	17	
DSQ	8	(Austria) Niki Lauda	McLaren-Ford	MI	70	Underweight	4	
Ret	5	(Republic of Ireland) Derek Daly	Williams-Ford	G	60	Spun Off	13	
Ret	17	(West Germany) Jochen Mass	March-Ford	P	60	Engine	25	
Ret	15	(France) Alain Prost	Renault	MI	59	Spun Off	1	
Ret	2	(Italy) Riccardo Patrese	Brabham-BMW	G	52	Spun Off	9	
Ret	30	(Italy) Mauro Baldi	Arrows-Ford	P	51	Throttle	26	
Ret	31	(France) Jean-Pierre Jarier	Osella-Ford	P	37	Broken Wing	16	
Ret	22	(Italy) Andrea de Cesaris	Alfa Romeo	MI	34	Gearbox	6	
Ret	4	(United Kingdom) Brian Henton	Tyrrell-Ford	G	33	Engine	20	
Ret	3	(Italy) Michele Alboreto	Tyrrell-Ford	G	29	Engine	5	
Ret	35	(United Kingdom) Derek Warwick	Toleman-Hart	P	29	Transmission	19	
Ret	36	(Italy) Teo Fabi	Toleman-Hart	P	13	Brakes	21	
Ret	12	(United Kingdom) Nigel Mansell	Lotus-Ford	G	9	Clutch	7	
Ret	16	(France) René Arnoux	Renault	MI	7	Turbo	2	
Ret	9	(West Germany) Manfred Winkelhock	ATS-Ford	MI	0	Clutch	12	
Ret	23	(Italy) Bruno Giacomelli	Alfa Romeo	MI	0	Collision	15	
Ret	10	(Chile) Eliseo Salazar	ATS-Ford	MI	0	Collision	18	
DNS	28	(France) Didier Pironi	Ferrari	G		Withdrew due to Villeneuve's death		
DNS	27	(Canada) Gilles Villeneuve	Ferrari	G		Fatal accident during qualifying		
DNQ	14	(Colombia) Roberto Guerrero	Ensign-Ford	A				
DNQ	33	(Netherlands) Jan Lammers	Theodore-Ford	A				
DNPQ	32	(Italy) Riccardo Paletti	Osella-Ford	P				
DNPQ	19	(Spain) Emilio de Villota	March-Ford	P				

== Notes ==
- This was the 200th Grand Prix in which a German driver participated. In those 200 races, German drivers won 3 Grands Prix, achieved 20 podium finishes, 1 pole position, and 4 fastest laps.
- This was the 25th Grand Prix start for Osella and the 5th Grand Prix start for Toleman.
- This was the 5th Grand Prix start for Hart-powered car.
- This was the 9th Belgian Grand Prix win for a Ford-powered car, breaking the previous record set by Ferrari at the 1979 Belgian Grand Prix.
- This the second of only three races that the Ferrari team entered but did not start. The other two were the 1950 French Grand Prix and the 1982 Swiss Grand Prix.

== Championship standings after the race ==
Drivers' Championship standings

Pos	Driver	Points
1	(France) Alain Prost	18
2	(United Kingdom) John Watson	17
3	(Finland) Keke Rosberg	14
4	(Austria) Niki Lauda	12
5	(France) Didier Pironi	10

Constructors' Championship standings

Pos	Constructor	Points
1	(United Kingdom) McLaren-Ford	29
2	(France) Renault	22
3	(United Kingdom) Williams-Ford	20
4	(Italy) Ferrari	16
5	(United Kingdom) Tyrrell-Ford	10

- Note: Only the top five positions are included for both sets of standings.

Previous race: 1982 San Marino Grand Prix	FIA Formula One World Championship; 1982 season	Next race: 1982 Monaco Grand Prix
Previous race: 1981 Belgian Grand Prix	Belgian Grand Prix	Next race: 1983 Belgian Grand Prix
