= Brabham BT50 =

Formula One racing car

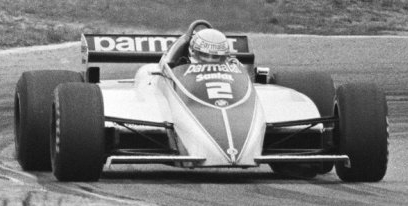
- Riccardo Patrese driving the BT50 at the Dutch Grand Prix
- Category: Formula One
- Constructor: Brabham
- Designers: Gordon Murray (Technical Director); David North (Chief Designer); Paul Rosche (Chief Engine Designer (BMW))
- Predecessor: Brabham BT49D
- Successor: Brabham BT52

Technical specifications
- Chassis: Aluminium monocoque
- Suspension (front): Double wishbone
- Suspension (rear): Double wishbone
- Engine: BMW M12, 1,499 cc (91.5 cu in), I4, Turbo, mid-engine, longitudinally mounted
- Transmission: Hewland / Alfa Romeo 5-speed manual
- Fuel: Elf; Valvoline
- Tyres: Goodyear

Competition history
- Notable entrants: Parmalat Racing Team
- Notable drivers: 1. (Brazil) Nelson Piquet; 2. (Italy) Riccardo Patrese
- Debut: 1982 South African Grand Prix
| Races | Wins | Poles | F/Laps |
|---|---|---|---|
| 13 | 1 | 1 | 3 |
- Constructors' Championships: 0
- Drivers' Championships: 0

The Brabham BT50 was a Formula One racing car designed by Gordon Murray and powered by a turbo BMW engine. It was raced by the Brabham team, owned by Bernie Ecclestone, during the 1982 Formula One season. Driven by Nelson Piquet and Riccardo Patrese, it made its debut at the South African Grand Prix before being withdrawn for further development of its engine while the team reverted to the previous year's car, the Brabham BT49. On the reintroduction of the BT50, Piquet finished fifth in the Belgian Grand Prix. A few races later he drove it to a win in the Canadian Grand Prix. Later in the year it achieved three more finishes in the points for the team. During the second half of the season, Brabham implemented the strategy of mid-race refueling. This allowed Piquet and Patrese to start the races relatively light and use their reduced weight to gain track position over their competitors before stopping to refuel. The poor reliability of the BT50 meant that they had only a few opportunities to demonstrate the strategy in practice.

Despite its unreliability, the BT50 was fast, taking one pole and three fastest laps during the season. Brabham finished fifth in the 1982 Constructor's Championship with 41 points although 19 of these were earned with the BT49.

== Background ==
The possibility of BMW entering Formula One was raised as early as mid-1979. Brabham's lead driver, Niki Lauda, was becoming disgruntled at the performance of the uncompetitive Brabham-Alfa BT48 and discreet discussions were held with aim of getting him into a BMW-powered McLaren. The Brabham team management were also unhappy with Alfa Romeo, not helped by the Italian company producing its own car (Note: This was the Alfa Romeo 177, driven by Bruno Giacomelli for three races during the 1979 season.) and entering it into that year's Belgian Grand Prix.

While the proposed Lauda-McLaren deal did not eventuate and the Austrian abruptly retired at the Canadian race, the relationship between Brabham and BMW had prospered and they came to an engine supply agreement in the summer of 1980. While Brabham switched to normally aspirated Cosworth DFVs for the 1980 season, the team's owner, Bernie Ecclestone, could see that turbo engines were likely to be key to being competitive in the long term.

== Design and development ==
Initial testing of the BMW M12/13 (Note: This designation was derived from it being the 13th variant of the basic BMW M12 engine.) turbo engine, a modification of the four-cylinder iron block and existing Formula Two four-valve cylinder head, began in late 1980 using a modified BT49 while Brabham's chief designer, Gordon Murray, worked on the BT50. The new car was completed in mid-1981 and carried over many elements from the BT49, which Brabham had run throughout the 1980 season. The BT50 had double wishbone suspension and pullrod activation coil spring/damper units, which were semi-inboard, while its monocoque was an aluminium tub with carbon stiffening panels. The team continued with its Hewland/Alfa gearbox, first used in 1976 when Brabham ran a V12 Alfa Romeo, but this was found to struggle with the power and torque of the BMW turbo engine.

The BT50 had a slightly longer wheelbase and a fuel cell with 180 litres (48 US gal) of capacity to accommodate the fuel consumption requirements of the engine. Overall, with the engine in place, the BT50 weighed in at 590 kilograms (1,300 lb), ten more than its predecessor. It was also one of the first Formula One cars to feature onboard telemetry as a means of monitoring the engine's fuel injection.

The first public appearance of the BT50 was at the 1981 British Grand Prix, where the team's lead driver, Nelson Piquet, used it in practice. He set a practice time 0.7 seconds slower than his qualifying effort in the Cosworth DFV-powered BT49. The BT50 handled poorly but still recorded 309 kilometres per hour (192 mph) through the speed trap, some 24 kilometres per hour (15 mph) faster than the BT49. Piquet, a firm advocate for the BMW engine and believing, like Ecclestone, that the road to success in the near future was with a turbocharged engine, tested the BT50 throughout 1981. Testing was plagued with unreliability; in one testing session at the Paul Ricard circuit in France, the team suffered nine engine blowups.

Once the 1982 season began, there was relatively little development of the BT50 chassis during the season although there were some aerodynamic revisions. A total of five BT50s were built.

== Race history ==
Brabham began 1982 with three BT50s, one of which was the original BT50 built the previous year, for the season opening South African Grand Prix. It was hoped that the high altitude, as it had in the past for the turbo-powered cars run by the Renault team, would be beneficial for the BMW engines. This proved to be the case in qualifying, Piquet second on the grid alongside René Arnoux in the Renault, with Riccardo Patrese in the other BT50 two places back in fourth. However, in a disastrous race for the BT50, both drivers retired early in the race. Piquet bogged down at the start and was quickly swamped by the field. Running 13th at the end of the first lap, he spun off on lap 4. Patrese had at least run in fourth place for a time before he too retired, due to a turbo bearing failure. Feeling the engines were still not race ready, Ecclestone opted to field Cosworth-powered BT49 chassis at the Brazilian Grand Prix. Piquet won that race but was later disqualified for circumventing the minimum weight limit by running "water-cooled brakes". Both drivers also raced the BT49 at the Long Beach Grand Prix, and the team boycotted the San Marino Grand Prix as part of the ongoing FISA–FOCA war.

BMW was increasingly exasperated by Ecclestone's reluctance to run its engine and before the Belgian Grand Prix, issued public threats to terminate its relationship with Brabham if the BT50 was not run at the race. Consequently, Piquet and Patrese switched back to the BT50 for Belgium. Qualifying was poor, Piquet and Patrese only managing eighth and ninth on the grid respectively. In the race itself, Piquet finished three laps behind the winner, although scoring two points for fifth place, while Patrese retired.

As the relationship between Brabham and BMW remained tense, Ecclestone was forced to compromise; Piquet persevered with the BT50 whilst Patrese raced with the Cosworth-powered BT49. At the Monaco Grand Prix, Patrese won a somewhat chaotic event, whilst Piquet was more than two seconds slower in qualifying and retired from the race with gearbox trouble. Piquet fared even worse in Detroit; his main car blew its engine six laps into the first qualifying session, while the engine of the spare refused to run cleanly. As the second qualifying session was conducted in rain, none of the drivers were unable to improve their times from the previous day. This left Piquet unable to qualify for the race.

=== Canadian Grand Prix ===
Serious consideration was given to running only a single BT50 for Piquet at the following Canadian Grand Prix with his spare car being a BT49 although ultimately this did not eventuate. After an initial scare when Piquet suffered a misfire within two laps of starting the first practice session, Brabham's fortunes suddenly improved. Having qualified fourth, just over a second slower than Didier Pironi's Ferrari 126C2 on pole, Piquet moved into second place from the start and then into the lead on lap 9 and, on a day when the cool conditions suited the turbocharged engines, never relinquished it to record BMW's first Formula One victory. It was a Brabham one-two, for Patrese, still in the BT49, finished second.

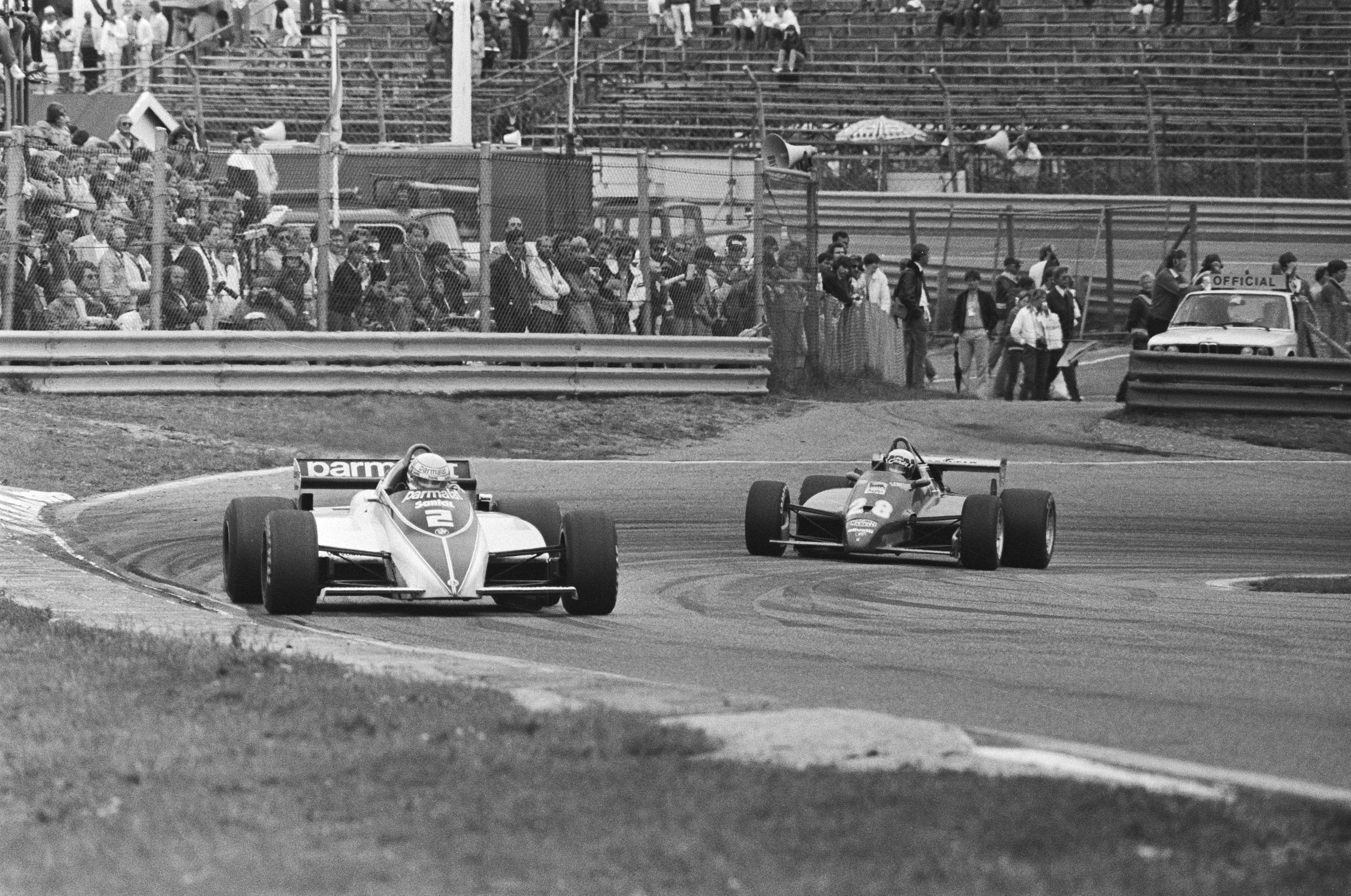
Patrese dueling with Didier Pironi's Ferrari at the Dutch Grand Prix

Piquet followed this performance up with second place at the next race, in Holland (having qualified third). Patrese, now also in the BT50, finished 15th, from tenth on the grid. The improvement in performance in Canada and Holland coincided with BMW revising the fuel mix control, a change that Piquet noted brought the behaviour of the BMW engine in line with the Cosworth DFV.

=== Introduction of mid-race refueling ===
From the 1982 British Grand Prix, Murray implemented a radical strategy of a planned pit stop for refuelling mid-way through the race to run at the front of the field. The idea was to allow the cars to start the race with a lighter fuel load as well softer, faster, tyres which would get replaced at the refueling pitstop. Another advantage was that the drivers could run higher boost levels, knowing that they would receive a top up of fuel. Reliability proved to be a problem and this restricted Piquet and Patrese from fully utilising the potential of this strategy. In Britain, Patrese out-qualified Piquet by nearly half a second and placed second on the grid; Piquet was third. Patrese stalled at the start of the race, allowing Piquet into the lead as Keke Rosberg, on pole, had been unable to start his car in time to begin the parade lap. However, Piquet retired before he could test the team's new pitstop strategy.

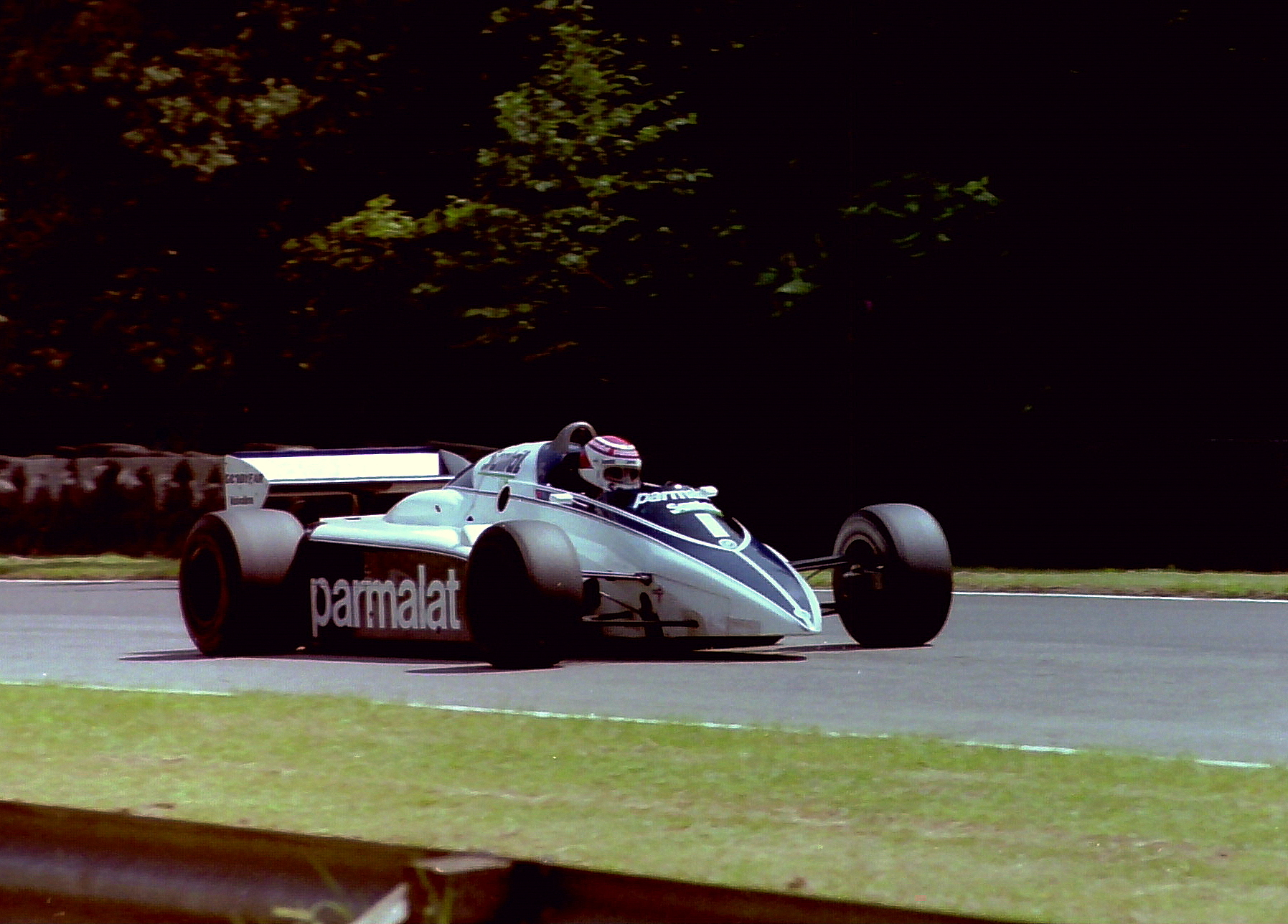
Piquet in the BT50 at Brands Hatch, the scene of the 1982 British Grand Prix

In France, Brabham struggled with the fuel mixture for the engines and on a fast Paul Ricard circuit that should have advantaged the teams running turbo engines, could only manage fourth and sixth on the grid, Patrese ahead of Piquet. However, the strategy of starting with a light fuel load saw both BT50s running first and second within five laps of the start. However, having set the fastest lap of the race, Patrese retired from the lead on lap 8 with a blown engine. Piquet inherited the lead but he too retired with engine problems on lap 24.

At BMW's home race in Germany, the BT50s qualified third and fifth, Piquet this time ahead of Patrese. At the start of the race, Arnoux, in his Renault, initially led but by the second lap, he had been passed by Piquet. By virtue of the team's now usual strategy of starting on soft tyres and a light fuel load saw Piquet build up a substantial lead and begin to lap the slower cars. On lap 19, with his scheduled pitstop just two laps away, he crashed into Eliseo Salazar's ATS when attempting to pass. Both cars came to a halt and stalled, forcing their drivers to abandon them trackside. In an incident captured on live television, while remonstrating with Salazar, Piquet lashed out at him with hands and feet. Patrese had already fallen by the wayside due to an engine failure.

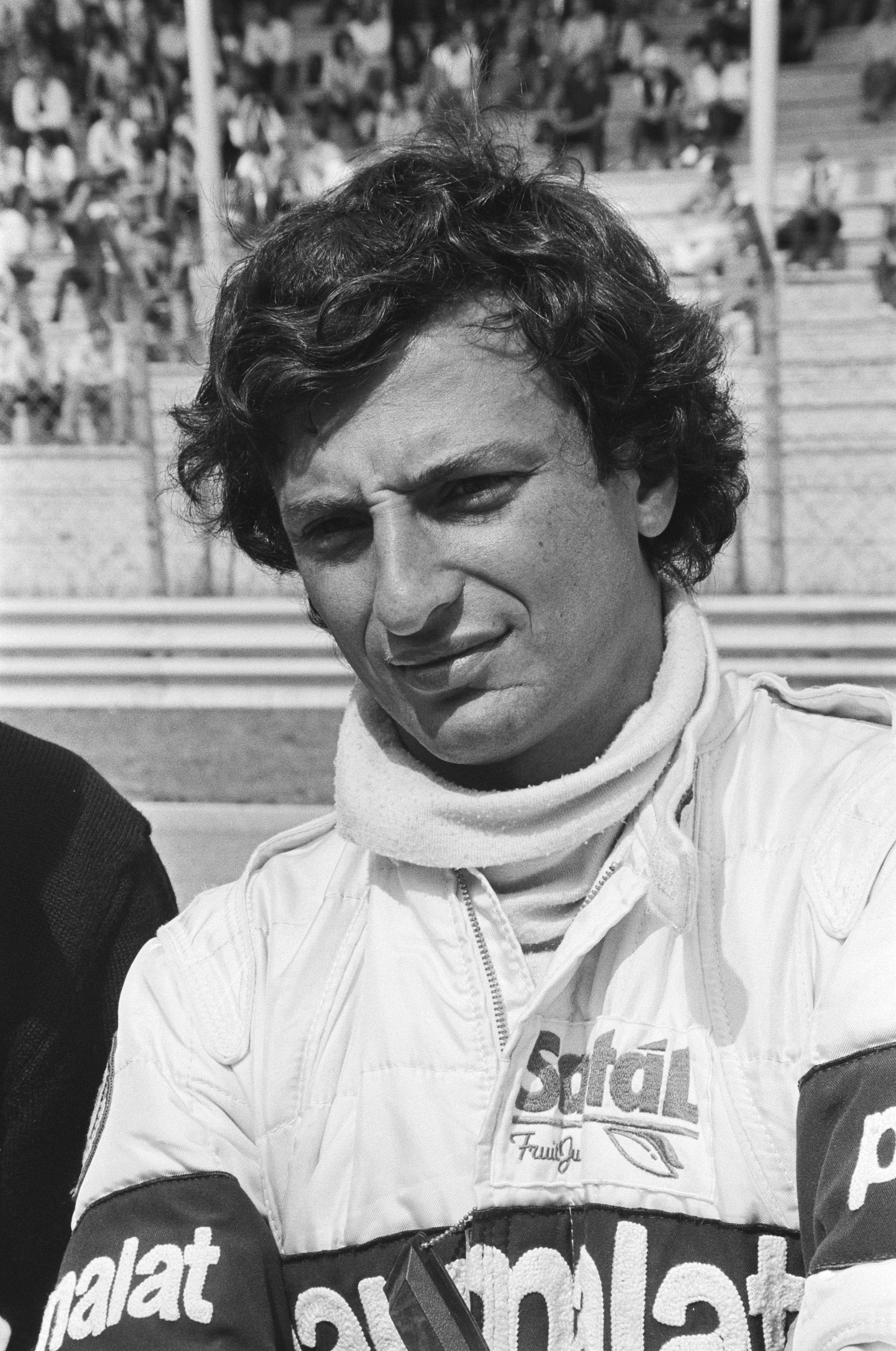
Brabham's Riccardo Patrese only scored one finish in the points with the BT50

Brabham finally had the opportunity to demonstrate their prowess at completing a midrace refueling at the Austrian Grand Prix. Qualifying had gone well, with the team locking out the front row of the grid. Piquet started from pole position but blistered a tyre within a few laps. This allowed Patrese, running second behind his team leader, to move into the lead. Piquet's tyre problems saw him come into for his first pitstop on lap 16. Despite signalling his intent to enter the pits, the Brabham mechanics were not prepared as his scheduled pitstop was not for several more laps. Piquet was stationary for nearly a minute while the team found and fitted replacement tyres and resumed in fourth place. Patrese, still in the lead, came into the pits for his scheduled stop on lap 24. This time, the mechanics completed a swift turnaround and Patrese, having only been held up for 15 seconds, resumed the race still in the lead. It was only to last for three more laps before he spun off due to an engine failure. Nonetheless, his performance had validated the strategy of starting with a light fuel load. Piquet suffered a camshaft drive failure a few laps later which ended his race while running in third place.

Both Brabhams finished in the points at the Swiss Grand Prix which, despite its official title, was held at the Dijon-Prenois circuit in France. Here Patrese, having qualified in third, opted to run nonstop and finished in fifth. Piquet, starting from sixth on the grid, failed to benefit from running light as his car was fitted with tyres that were too hard. He was only just able to stay ahead of his teammate at the end of the race in fourth place. This proved to be the last race finishes achieved by a BT50; in the Italian Grand Prix both cars retired within a few laps of the race start with clutch problems and at the last race of the year, at Las Vegas, Piquet and Patrese fared little better. Patrese dropped out, again with clutch problems, while Piquet's engine had issues with its spark plugs which led to his eventual retirement.

== Summary ==
Piquet scored 20 points driving the BT50, finishing 11th in the Driver's Championship. Patrese finished tenth in the championship with 21 points. However, only two points came from his efforts with the BT50; the rest were from early in the season while he drove the BT49. The team placed fifth in the Constructor's Championship with 41 points. Despite the reliability issues, Brabham gained considerable experience with turbo engines and likewise BMW gained an appreciation of the pressures of running competitively in Formula One. The shared experience was put to good use in for the following season for which Brabham fielded the BT50's successor, the BT52, (Note: Design work on a chassis with the designation of BT51 had been completed by November 1982, but it was never built due to late changes in the technical regulations for the 1983 season.) with which Piquet won the 1983 Driver's Championship.

== Complete Formula One World Championship results ==
(key) (Results in bold indicate pole position; results in italics indicate fastest lap)

| Year | Entrant | Engine | Tyres | Drivers | 1 | 2 | 3 | 4 | 5 | 6 | 7 | 8 | 9 | 10 | 11 | 12 | 13 | 14 | 15 | 16 | Points | WCC |
|---|---|---|---|---|---|---|---|---|---|---|---|---|---|---|---|---|---|---|---|---|---|---|
| 1982 | Parmalat Racing Brabham | BMW M12/13 | **G** | | RSA | BRA | USW | SMR | BEL | MON | DET | CAN | NED | GBR | FRA | GER | AUT | SUI | ITA | CPL | 41* | 5th |
| 1982 | Parmalat Racing Brabham | BMW M12/13 | **G** | Nelson Piquet | Ret | | | | 5 | Ret | DNQ | 1 | 2 | Ret | Ret | Ret | **Ret** | 4 | Ret | Ret | 41* | 5th |
| 1982 | Parmalat Racing Brabham | BMW M12/13 | **G** | Riccardo Patrese | Ret | | | | Ret | | | | 15 | Ret | Ret | Ret | Ret | 5 | Ret | Ret | 41* | 5th |

* 19 points scored in 1982 using the BT49

== Notes ==
Footnotes

Citations
