= Brabham BT49 =

Formula One racing car

Brabham BT49 Brabham BT49C Brabham BT49D
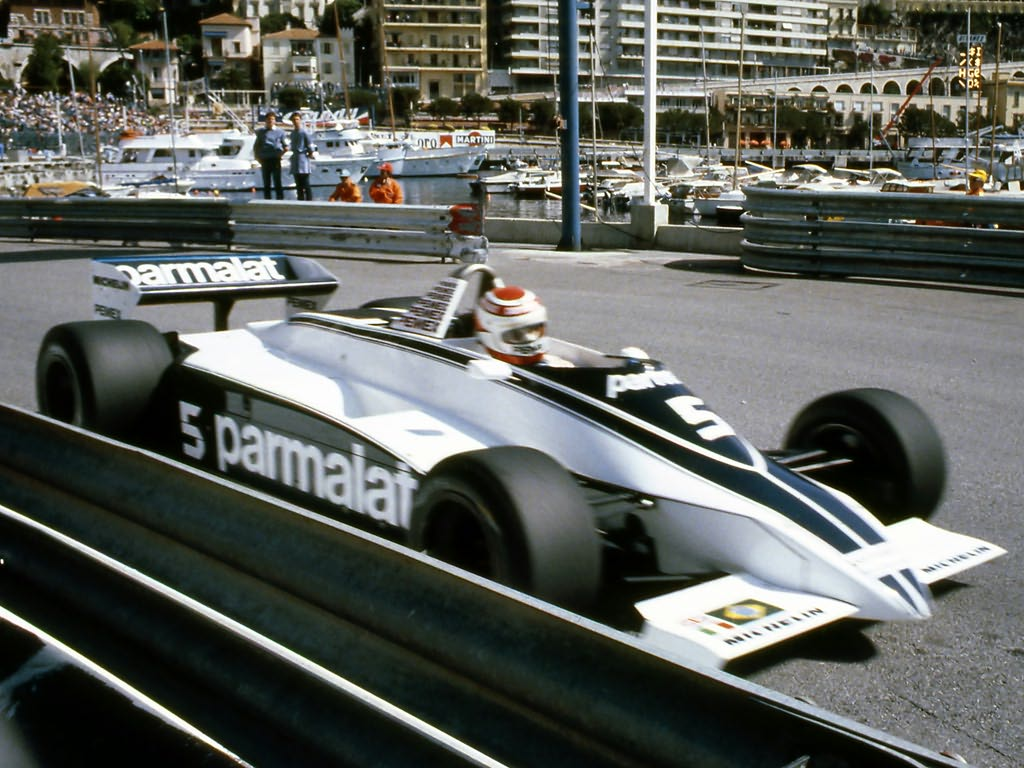
- The BT49C being driven by Piquet at Monaco in 1981
- Category: Formula One
- Constructor: Brabham
- Designers: Gordon Murray (Technical Director); David North (Chief Designer)
- Predecessor: BT48
- Successor: BT50

Technical specifications
- Chassis: Aluminium alloy monocoque
- Suspension (front): Double wishbone pullrod
- Suspension (rear): Double wishbone pullrod or Rocker arm
- Axle track: Front: 1,702 mm (67.0 in); Rear: 1,626 mm (64.0 in)
- Wheelbase: 2,718 mm (107.0 in)
- Engine: Cosworth DFV, 2,993 cc (182.6 cu in), 90° V8, NA, mid-engine, longitudinally mounted
- Transmission: Hewland FGA 400 / Alfa Romeo 6-speed manual
- Weight: 580 kg (1,278.7 lb)
- Fuel: 1979: Agip; 1980–1981: Elf; 1981–1982: Valvoline
- Tyres: Goodyear / Michelin

Competition history
- Notable entrants: Parmalat Racing Brabham
- Notable drivers: (Brazil) Nelson Piquet (Argentina) Ricardo Zunino (Mexico) Héctor Rebaque (Italy) Riccardo Patrese
- Debut: 1979 Canadian Grand Prix
Races	Wins	Poles	F/Laps
38; 36 F1 WC; 2 F1 other	7; 7 F1 WC; 0 F1 other	7; 6 F1 WC; 1 F1 other	4; 4 F1 WC; 0 F1 other
- Constructors' Championships: 0
- Drivers' Championships: 1 (1981, Nelson Piquet)

The Brabham BT49 /ˈbræbəm/ is a Formula One racing car designed by South African Gordon Murray for the British Brabham team. The BT49 competed in the 1979 to 1982 Formula One World Championships and was used by Brazilian driver Nelson Piquet to win his first World Championship in 1981.

The car was initially designed in 1979 as a short notice replacement for the team's Alfa Romeo-engined BT48, after Brabham team owner Bernie Ecclestone decided to end his relationship with the Italian engine manufacturer. The BT49 was created in only six weeks using elements of the BT48 chassis together with the widely used Cosworth DFV engine. The monocoque chassis is made from aluminium alloy and carbon fibre composites. The car was fitted with controversial hydropneumatic suspension and water-cooled brakes at different points in its life.

The BT49 was updated over four seasons taking a total of seven wins, six poles and 135 points. Seventeen were eventually built, most of which survive today. Some are used successfully in historic motorsport; Christian Glaesel won the 2005 FIA Historic Formula One Championship driving a BT49D.

== Concept ==
The BT49 was created by South African designer Gordon Murray for the Brabham team during the 1979 season of the Formula One motor racing World Championship. The Brabham team had been competing in partnership with engine supplier Alfa Romeo since 1976 and won races in the 1978 season. However, the team's 1979 car, the BT48, was not a great success. Alfa Romeo entered their own Type 177 and Type 179 cars in Formula One Grands Prix that summer, helping to convince the Brabham team owner Bernie Ecclestone that the partnership was over. Motorsport author Alan Henry writes that Ecclestone did not want his team to take second place to an Alfa Romeo works team, and that the team designing Alfa Romeo's cars was drawing on Brabham knowledge.

Alfa's engines were powerful, but had proved troublesome and according to Henry, "the days during which pure power was the main criterion had temporarily vanished by the start of 1979". Instead aerodynamic ground effect, as brought to Formula One by the Lotus 78 two years earlier, was the most important factor. To allow them to focus on this, the Brabham team reverted to a known quantity, the reliable and widely used Ford Cosworth DFV engine that it had last used in 1975. Three BT49s were designed and built in only six weeks for the Canadian Grand Prix on 30 September 1979; two of them were converted BT48 chassis and one was newly built.

== Chassis and suspension ==
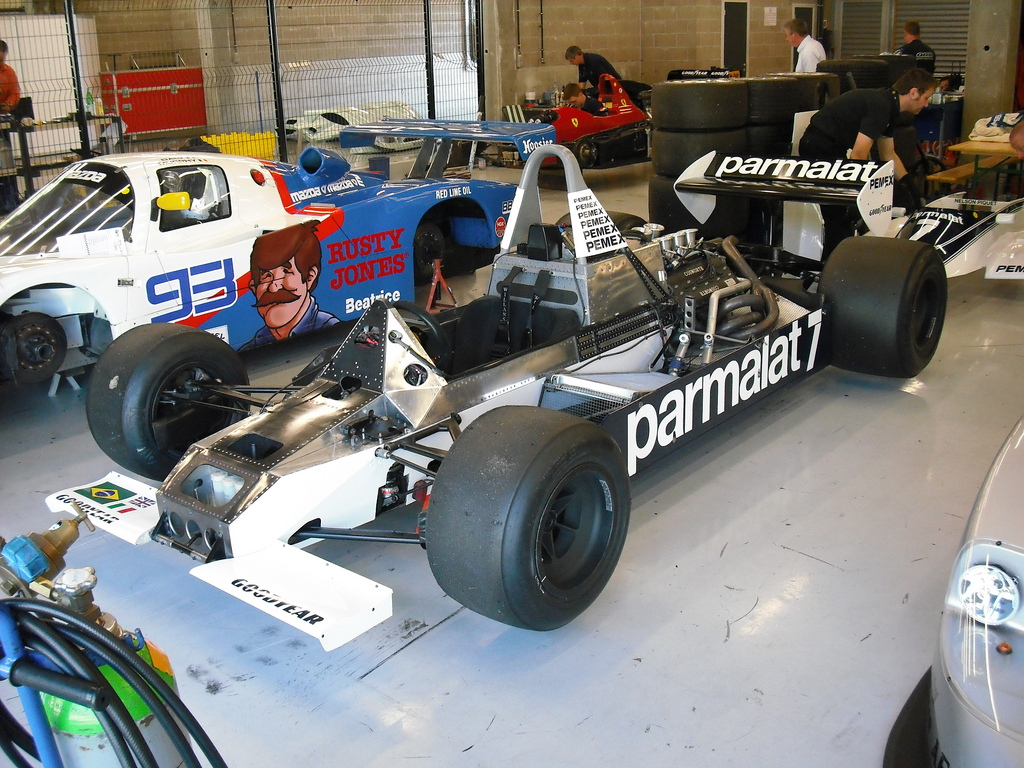
BT49C without its aerodynamic bodywork, which can be seen sitting on the ground behind the chassis

Like all of its Formula One contemporaries, the BT49 chassis is a monocoque structure. It is built from sheet aluminium alloy with reinforcement from carbon fibre composite panels and is one of the first Formula One chassis to incorporate this material structurally. The chassis is slightly longer than that of the BT48, and is new from the cockpit back with revised sidepods and a structural fuel tank reduced from 45 to 38 imperial gallons (205 to 173 L) capacity to match the reduced fuel consumption requirements of the DFV compared to the Alfa Romeo. This allowed a reduction in dry weight over the BT48 of 35 pounds (15.9 kg) and of 95 lb (43.1 kg) when fully fuelled.

The underside of the BT49 is shaped to create downforce through ground effect: air is accelerated under the car, reducing the air pressure beneath it and pushing the tyres down harder onto the track. This provides more grip and thus higher cornering speeds, but compared to conventional wings creates less of the drag that slows the car in a straight line. In its original form, the reduced pressure area under the car was sealed off with sliding skirts which rose and fell with the movement of the car to ensure no air could leak under it. According to Murray, the aerodynamics were the car's great strength: "It had more [downforce] than any other car and it all came from the ground effect. We ran the car with no front wing at all and scarcely any at the back."

The suspension, which controls the relative motion of the chassis and the wheels, is similar to that of the BT48: it features double wishbones front and rear, with the springs and dampers mounted on the chassis out of the airflow and activated by pullrods. Anti-roll bars are fitted front and rear. The BT49's disc brakes are mounted outboard, within the wheel hubs, and are activated by a single four piston brake caliper for each wheel. For most of the BT49's career, it used conventional steel brakes. Lighter reinforced carbon-carbon discs and pads, a technology that Brabham had introduced to Formula One in 1976, were used in 1981 and 1982; The wheels are of 13-inch (330 mm) diameter, although occasionally 15 in (381 mm) wheels were used at the front. The car initially raced on Goodyear tyres, but the team had to adapt the BT49 to Michelin's new radial tyres for part of the 1981 season when Goodyear temporarily withdrew from Formula One. Slick tyres were used in dry conditions and treaded tyres in the wet.

Three chassis, included the two modified BT48 units, were built for the end of the 1979 season. Two of these were re-used during the 1980 Formula One season, alongside seven new chassis.

== Engine and transmission ==
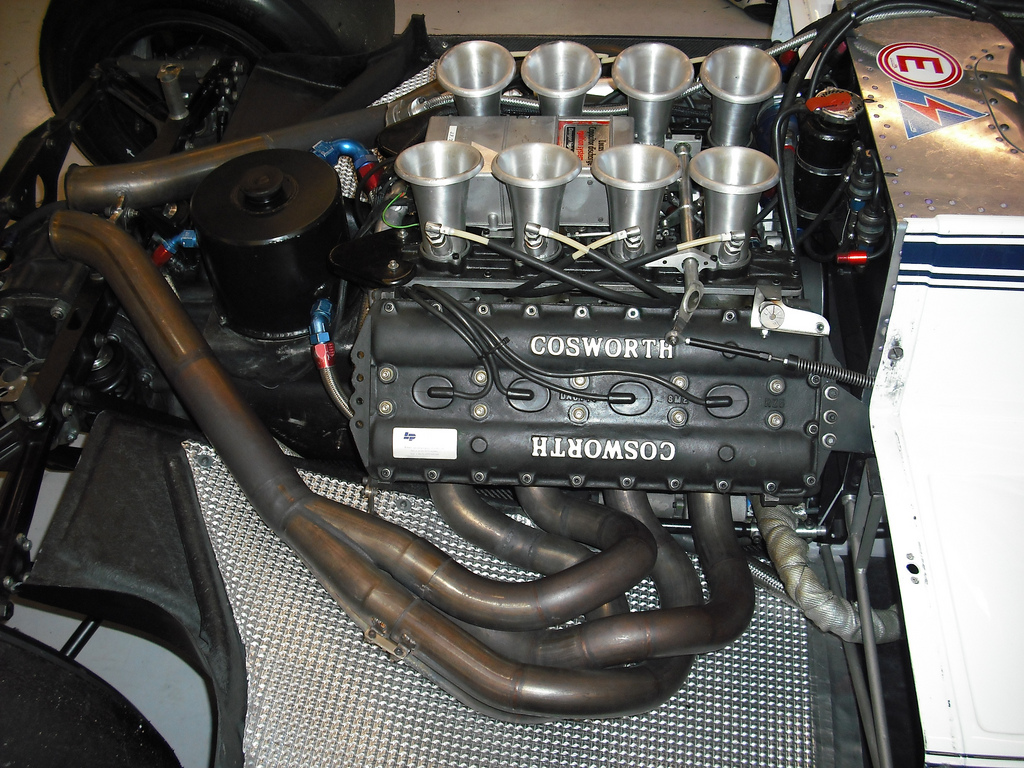
Cosworth DFV engine mounted in BT49C. The curved underside of the car can be seen beneath it.

The Ford Cosworth DFV was produced by Cosworth in Northampton and had been used in Formula One since 1967. It is a 2,993 cc (183 cu in) normally aspirated four-stroke engine with two banks of four cylinders at 90 degrees to each other in a 'V8' configuration. It has an aluminium alloy engine block with cylinder liners. Each of its crossflow cylinder heads has a single spark plug and four valves, activated by gear-driven double overhead camshafts. This, combined with the flat-plane crankshaft, provides a relatively simple exhaust layout, in which the exhaust pipes exit on the outer side of the block. The engine is water-cooled, with water and oil radiators mounted in the left and right sidepods respectively. In 1980, a revised version of the DFV was introduced in which ancillaries such as the water and oil pumps were reduced in size and grouped further forwards on the flanks of the engine to provide more clearance for ground effect tunnels under the cars.

Like its contemporaries, the BT49 uses the engine as a fully stressed structural component, carrying all loads between the front and rear of the car: the front of the engine bolts directly to the integral fuel tank and the back of the engine attaches to the car's rear suspension and gearbox. The Ford Cosworth engine integrated into the car much more easily than Alfa Romeo's large, heavy and inconsistently sized units: Murray described returning to the DFV as being "like having a holiday".

By the time the DFV was used in the BT49, it weighed roughly 340 lb (154 kg) and produced around 500 brake horsepower (373 kW) at about 11,000 revolutions per minute (rpm). Peak torque was 270 pound-feet (366 N⋅m) at 9,000 rpm. After his first test session with the car, Brazilian driver Nelson Piquet commented that he had always believed "that the DFV was quite a rough, coarse engine, but it felt quite the opposite to me. After those Alfa V12s it felt smooth and willing to rev." In 1979, when the BT49 first raced, all but three teams – Ferrari, Alfa Romeo and Renault – used the DFV, and the most powerful alternative (Alfa Romeo's V12) produced 525 bhp (391 kW). By 1982, most teams still used the DFV, but BMW, Ferrari and Hart had joined Renault in employing turbocharged engines: Ferrari's 1982 turbocharged V6 engine produced around 580 bhp (433 kW), while the DFV's output had remained at around 500 bhp.

Realising just how competitive the BT49 was on its debut at the Canadian Grand Prix in 1979, Cosworth would supply Brabham, along with Williams special "evolution" DFV engines which had a slightly shorter stroke and higher revving capacity than a standard DFV, producing around 500 to 510 BHP at over 11,000 RPM for the 1980 season. Throughout 1980 the BT49 was regularly one of the quickest naturally aspirated cars timed on the speed-traps (meaning only the turbocharged Renaults were usually faster in a straight-line), a combination of the low drag aerodynamically slippery bodywork and the development Cosworth engine. With Williams taking the decision from the 1980 French Grand Prix to effectively sub-contract "in house" to John Judd to modify the DFVs used by Alan Jones and Carlos Reutemann, Brabham effectively become the favoured runner in 1980 of development Cosworth engines, a situation which would continue throughout the rest of the 1980 season and the entire 1981 season, which effectively promoted Nelson Piquet to the status as the favoured "works" driver for Cosworth, a relationship that ultimately concluded in triumph with the 1981 Drivers World Championship.

The BT49 was initially fitted with the same gearbox the team had been using since 1977: a six-speed unit designed by Brabham using internal components from Hewland and a casing cast by Alfa Romeo.

== Variants ==
BT49B

A BT49B specification appeared early in the 1980 season; it was conceived around a new transverse gearbox designed by American gearbox specialist Pete Weismann. The new unit could be fitted with five or six gears and was tall and narrow, allowing a clearer airflow from under the car to the rear, with the intent of improving the ground effect. An alternative rear suspension layout was designed to go with this gearbox. It replaced the standard pullrods with rocker arms that activated vertical coil springs mounted behind the gearbox. The Weismann unit proved difficult to make reliable and was used alongside the original gearbox, mainly on a spare chassis, until the Dutch Grand Prix, after which it was put to one side.

BT49T

A modified BT49, dubbed BT49T, was used to test the earliest versions of BMW's turbocharged Formula One engine between the 1980 and 1981 Formula One seasons. This was a 1,499 cc (92 cu in) inline four-cylinder engine, with a single KKK turbocharger mounted in the left hand sidepod of the car. The first version of the engine was said to produce 557 bhp (415 kW).

BT49C

For the 1981 season, a BT49C specification was produced with a chassis lightened through increased use of carbon composite materials. Five of this variant were built and two of the previous year's cars converted to this specification. That year a minimum ride height of 60 millimetres (2.4 in) was introduced and sliding skirts were banned, with the intention of limiting ground effect and slowing the cars. The BT49C regained its front wings to compensate in part for the downforce lost. More significantly, Murray devised a hydropneumatic suspension system for the BT49C in which soft air springs supported the car at the regulation height for checks while stationary. At speed, where the ride height could not be measured, downforce compressed the air and the car settled to a much lower height, creating more downforce. Because the skirts now had to be fixed, the suspension had to be very stiff to allow them to consistently seal around the sides of the car: by the end of the 1981 season, total suspension movement was only 1.5 inches (38 mm), half of which came from the compression of the tyres. A lightweight qualifying chassis was produced, featuring a small fuel tank and lighter reinforced carbon-carbon brake discs and pads.

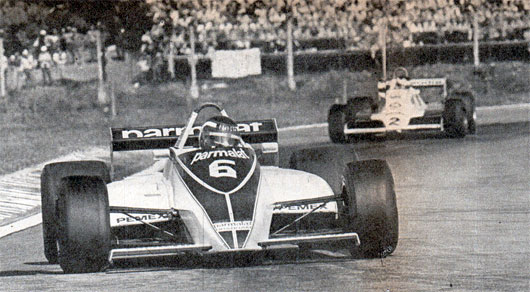
Rebaque in the BT49C at 1981 Argentine GP, Carlos Reutemann, behind.

BT49D

Three new BT49D chassis were built for the 1982 season, featuring a still lighter chassis and one-piece bodywork. By this stage, the cars had to be ballasted to bring them up to the minimum weight limit of 580 kg (1,279 lb) specified in the rules. The BT49D used the carbon-carbon brakes as standard and was one of several DFV-powered cars to be fitted with large water tanks, ostensibly for "water-cooled brakes". In practice, the water was dumped early in the race, allowing the cars to race as much as 50 kg (110 lb) under the weight limit; the regulations stated coolant could be topped up at the end of the race before the weight was checked. In the view of the DFV teams, this practice met the letter of the regulations and equalised their performance with that of the more powerful turbocharged cars. The 60 mm ground clearance rule was removed for the 1982 season, but the fixed skirts and very stiff suspension remained.

== Racing history ==
The BT49's racing career got off to an unsettled start when Brabham's lead driver, Niki Lauda, abruptly quit the sport after 10 laps of the first practice session at the penultimate race of the 1979 season, the Canadian Grand Prix. The car soon showed promise: Piquet ran third in the race on the high speed Circuit Île Notre-Dame before retiring with a broken gearbox. Lauda's replacement, Argentine novice Ricardo Zunino, was seventh of the nine who completed the race. At the season finale in wet conditions at the Watkins Glen International circuit, Zunino spun off although Piquet set the fastest lap before a driveshaft failed, putting his car out of the race.

Early in the 1980 season, Piquet's car scored points finishes at the Argentine and South African Grands Prix, behind Alan Jones' Williams FW07-DFV and the turbocharged Renault RE20 of René Arnoux. At the fourth race of the season, the United States Grand Prix West, Piquet qualified on pole by over a second in a BT49 featuring some updates to the sidepods, bodywork and suspension, before leading the race, held on the streets of Long Beach, California, from start to finish. BT49s in Piquet's hands scored in seven of the ten remaining rounds of the championship. Towards the end of the season, the suspension was reworked for the Dutch Grand Prix on the high speed Circuit Park Zandvoort, lengthening the wheelbase by three inches and allowing the car to run in a lower drag configuration. Piquet won after Jones destroyed his FW07's skirts on kerbs. Piquet also won the next race, the Italian Grand Prix to give himself a one-point lead over Williams driver Jones. By the end of the season the BT49 was "arguably the fastest Cosworth-powered car", but Piquet lost the title to Jones at the penultimate race of the year, the Canadian Grand Prix, when a development engine failed while he was leading the race. The BT49s driven by the team's second drivers—Zunino and then from mid-season Mexican Héctor Rebaque—either retired or finished outside the points, with the exception of Rebaque's sixth place at the Canadian race. The team finished third in the constructors' championship behind Williams and Ligier, unable to compete with only one car scoring points.

In December 1980, Indycar driver Rick Mears tested the BT49 at Circuit Paul Ricard and was half a second behind Piquet but was faster than him at Riverside International Raceway in southern California, Mears was offered a contract to drive for Brabham in 1981 but he declined the offer and stayed with Team Penske in IndyCar.

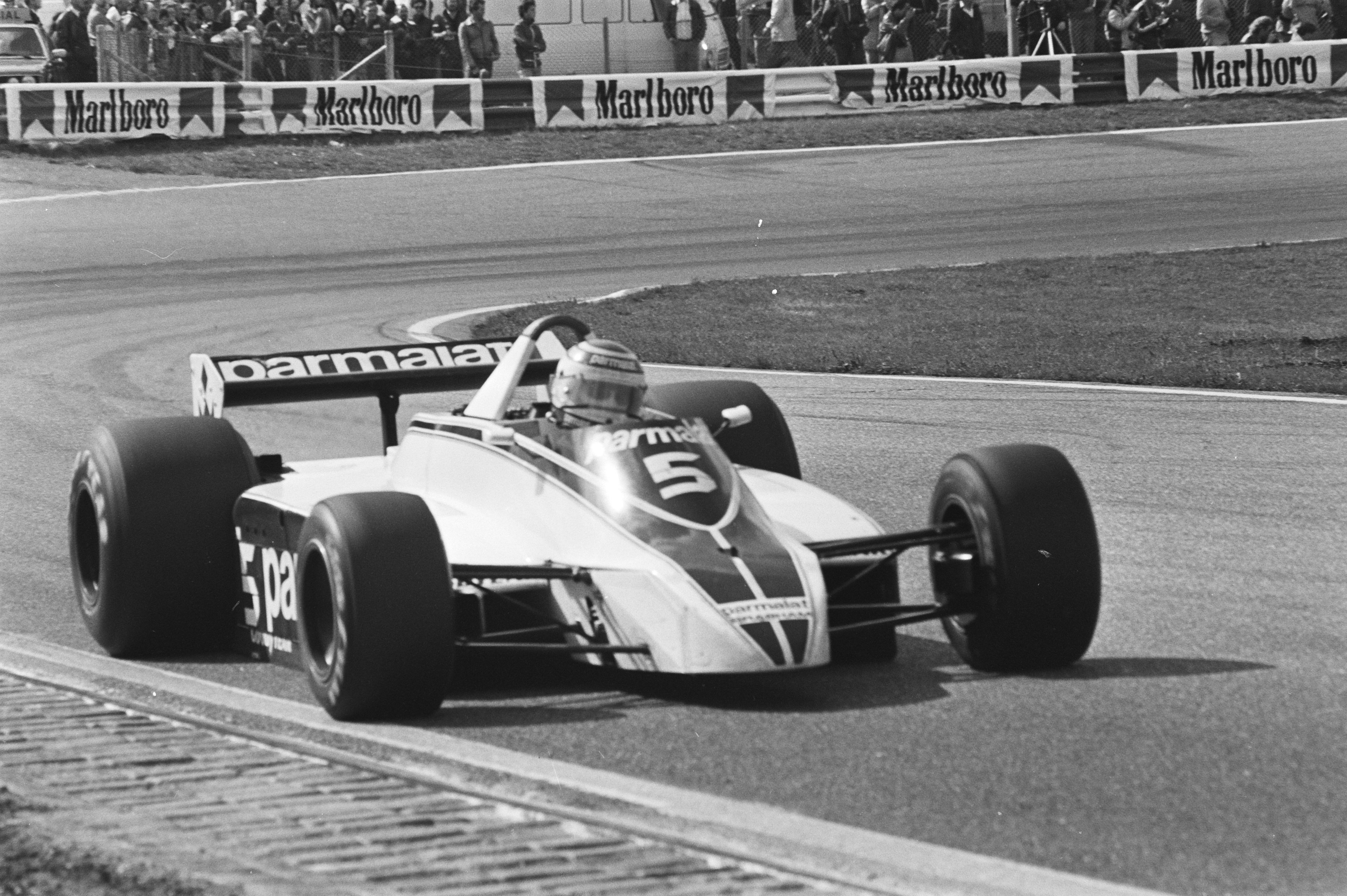
Nelson Piquet driving the BT49 at Zandvoort in 1980

Disagreement between the teams and the sport's administrators over the technical regulations for the 1981 Formula One season contributed to Goodyear's temporary withdrawal from Formula One and meant that the 1981 South African Grand Prix was run by the teams to 1980 regulations using cars with sliding skirts. Piquet finished second in a BT49B, but the race did not count towards the championship. The season proper opened with the United States Grand Prix West, at which the BT49C was introduced. To the team's surprise, it was the only car to exploit the "obvious" loophole in the new ground clearance regulation by lowering itself, but the BT49Cs raced with conventional suspension after the hydropneumatic system repeatedly jammed. The team revised the system continuously over the next three races and used it to set pole position at the Brazilian and Argentine Grands Prix and win the Argentine and San Marino races while continuing to suffer from the system not rising or lowering correctly.

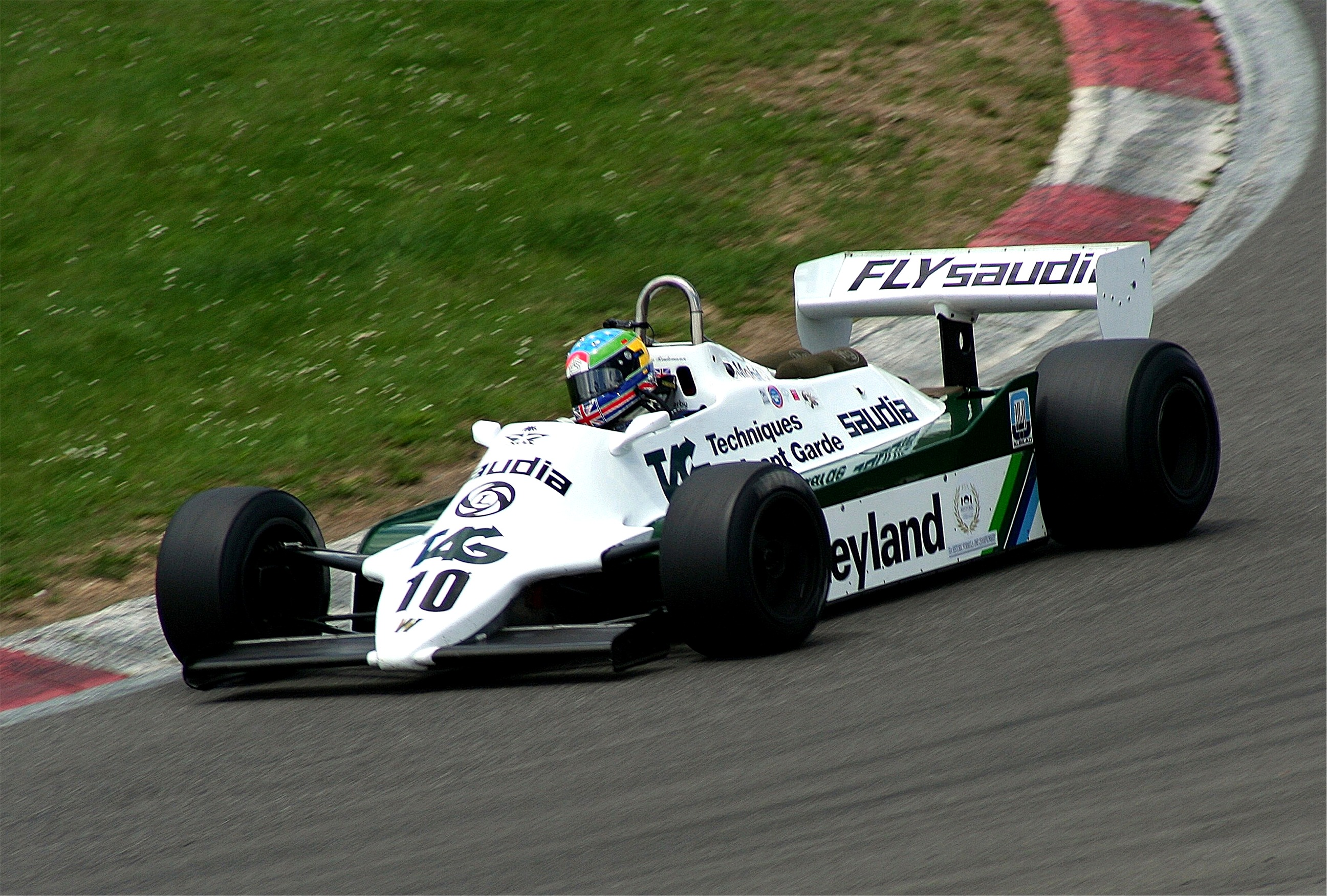
The Cosworth-powered Williams FW07 had a similarly lengthy competitive career and was the BT49's main rival in 1980 and 1981.

Frank Williams led an abortive protest against the car at the Argentine Grand Prix, objecting to the flexibility of the fixed skirts used to seal the underside of the car, which allowed them to replicate the effect of a sliding skirt. At the following race, the scrutineers rejected the flexible skirts. Brabham replaced them with stiffer material from one of the other teams for the race, which Piquet won. As the season progressed, other teams developed their own lowering systems—a front spring and cylinder were stolen from the Brabham garage in Argentina— but after a rule clarification from FISA many cars were lowered by the driver pressing a switch, a development that Murray found frustrating in light of Brabham's efforts to develop a system that he considered legal. The cars ran on Goodyear tyres again from the sixth round of the championship; motorsport author Doug Nye believes this cost the BT49s good results at several races while the American company adapted to the latest Formula One developments. Despite the virtually solid suspension now required to maintain a consistent ride height, which put components under greater strain, Piquet built a championship challenge on the back of consistent reliability: by the end of the season, his BT49Cs had finished 10 of 15 races, with only one mechanical failure. Piquet finished fifth at the final race of the season—the Caesars Palace Grand Prix—to take the title from Carlos Reutemann in a Williams FW07 by one point.

Brabham had been working with the German engine manufacturer BMW since 1980 on the development of a turbocharged engine for Formula One. The BMW-powered BT50 made its debut at the start of the 1982 season, taking advantage of the high-altitude Kyalami circuit in South Africa, which favoured turbocharged cars. However, the as yet unreliable BMW-powered cars were dropped for the next two races. Piquet finished first at the Brazilian Grand Prix in a BT49D, but was disqualified after a protest from Renault and Ferrari on the grounds that the car had raced underweight due to its water-cooled brakes. FISA ruled that in future all cars must be weighed before coolants were topped up, resulting in a boycott of the fourth race of the season by most of the DFV-powered teams, including Brabham. Under threat from BMW, Brabham did not use its Ford-powered BT49s again until the sixth race of the season, the Monaco Grand Prix, where one was entered for Riccardo Patrese alongside Piquet in a BT50. Patrese won the race after a chaotic final lap on which several other cars stopped. Patrese used the BT49 for the next two races, taking a second place behind Piquet's BMW-powered car in the BT49's final Formula One race, the 1982 Canadian Grand Prix.

== Historic racing ==
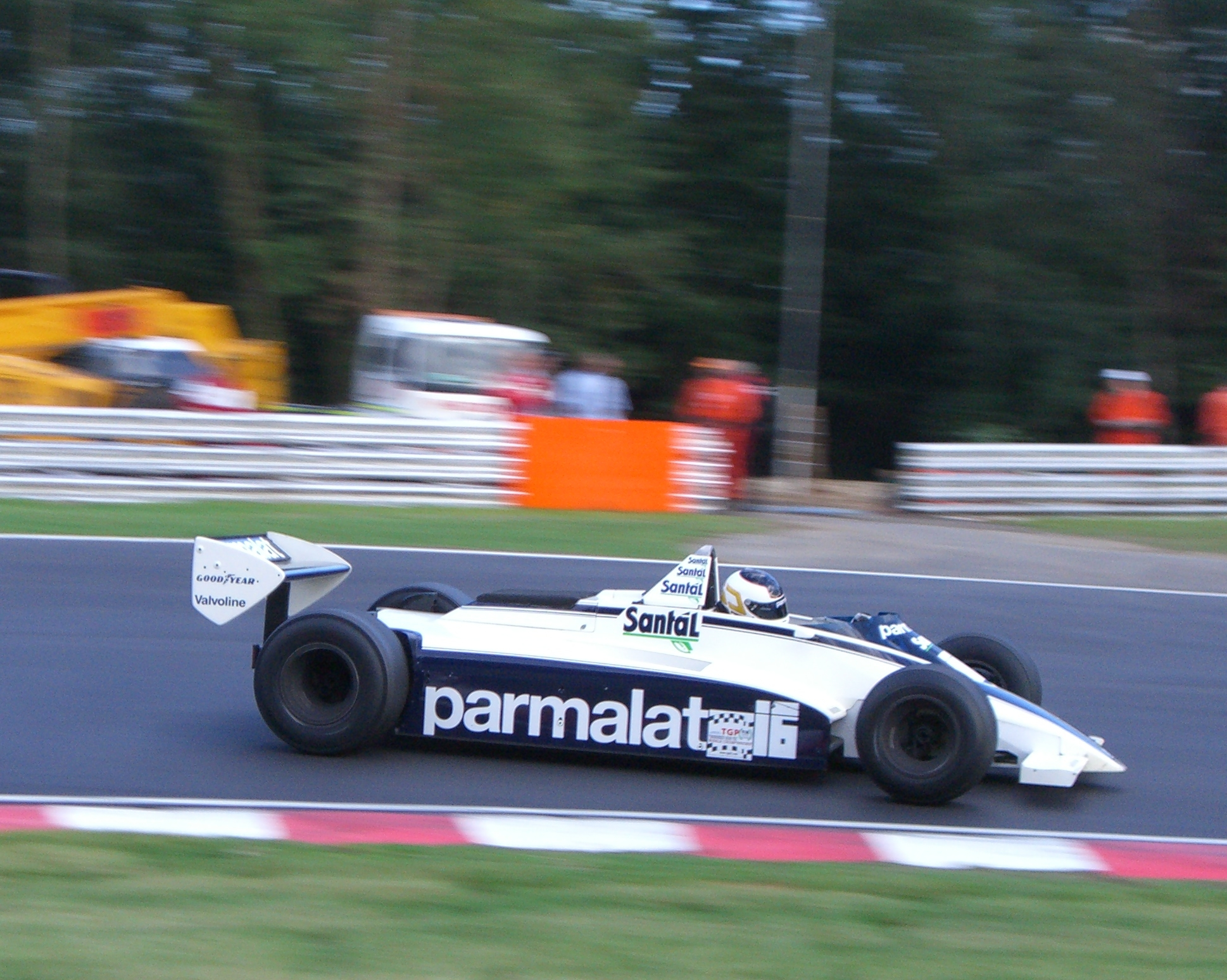
Christian Glaesel driving the BT49D in which he won the 2005 Thoroughbred Grand Prix championship

Since 1995, BT49s have competed regularly in the FIA Historic Formula One Championship. The championship is open to cars that competed in Formula One in the DFV era, between 1967 and 1985, in several classes to allow for equal competition. The BT49 competes in class C, for post 1971 ground effects cars. In 1999, Motor Sport magazine tested a BT49D from the series featuring 530 bhp (395 kW) from its developed DFV at 11,200 rpm, but the championship has since introduced rules to restrict engines to 10,500 rpm to keep costs down. While the cars' original skirts can be kept, they must be set up such that there is 40 mm (1.6 in) clearance beneath the car, a rule that removes most of the advantage of ground effect. The hydropneumatic suspension employed during 1981 is not permitted. The carbon-carbon brakes originally used in 1981 and 1982 are also banned and the cars must run with conventional brake pads and steel brakes. The cars use Avon slick tyres. Christian Glaesel won the 2005 FIA Historic Formula One Championship driving a BT49D and Joaquin Folch won the 2012 championship in a BT49C.

== Complete Formula One World Championship results ==
(key) (Results in bold indicate pole position; results in italics indicate fastest lap)

Year	Team	Engine	Tyres	Drivers	1	2	3	4	5	6	7	8	9	10	11	12	13	14	15	16	Points	WCC
1979	Parmalat Racing Brabham	Ford DFV V8	**G**		ARG	BRA	RSA	USW	ESP	BEL	MON	FRA	GBR	GER	AUT	NED	ITA	CAN	USE		**0**^{1}	**NC**^{1}
1979	Parmalat Racing Brabham	Ford DFV V8	**G**	Niki Lauda														WD			**0**^{1}	**NC**^{1}
1979	Parmalat Racing Brabham	Ford DFV V8	**G**	Nelson Piquet														Ret	Ret		**0**^{1}	**NC**^{1}
1979	Parmalat Racing Brabham	Ford DFV V8	**G**	Ricardo Zunino														7	Ret		**0**^{1}	**NC**^{1}
1980	Parmalat Racing Brabham	Ford DFV V8	**G**		ARG	BRA	RSA	USW	BEL	MON	FRA	GBR	GER	AUT	NED	ITA	CAN	USE			**55**	**3rd**
1980	Parmalat Racing Brabham	Ford DFV V8	**G**	Nelson Piquet	2	Ret	4	**1**	Ret	3	4	2	4	5	1	1	**Ret**	Ret			**55**	**3rd**
1980	Parmalat Racing Brabham	Ford DFV V8	**G**	Ricardo Zunino	7	8	10	Ret	Ret	DNQ	Ret										**55**	**3rd**
1980	Parmalat Racing Brabham	Ford DFV V8	**G**	Héctor Rebaque								7	Ret	10	Ret	Ret	6	Ret			**55**	**3rd**
1981	Parmalat Racing Brabham	Ford DFV V8	**G** **MI**		USW	BRA	ARG	SMR	BEL	MON	ESP	FRA	GBR	GER	AUT	NED	ITA	CAN	CPL		**61**	**2nd**
1981	Parmalat Racing Brabham	Ford DFV V8	**G** **MI**	Nelson Piquet	3	**12**	**1**	1	Ret	**Ret**	Ret	3	Ret	1	3	2	6	**5**	5		**61**	**2nd**
1981	Parmalat Racing Brabham	Ford DFV V8	**G** **MI**	Héctor Rebaque	Ret	Ret	Ret	4	Ret	DNQ	Ret	9	5	4	Ret	4	Ret	Ret	Ret		**61**	**2nd**
1982	Parmalat Racing Brabham	Ford DFV V8	**G**		RSA	BRA	USW	SMR	BEL	MON	DET	CAN	NED	GBR	FRA	GER	AUT	SUI	ITA	CPL	**19**^{2}	**9th**^{2}
1982	Parmalat Racing Brabham	Ford DFV V8	**G**	Nelson Piquet		DSQ	Ret														**19**^{2}	**9th**^{2}
1982	Parmalat Racing Brabham	Ford DFV V8	**G**	Riccardo Patrese		Ret	3			1	Ret	2									**19**^{2}	**9th**^{2}

^1 Placings in the constructors' championship are for chassis-engine combinations. Brabham used both Alfa Romeo and Ford-powered cars during this season: the BT49-Fords scored no points and Brabham-Ford was not classified.

^2 Brabham used both Ford and BMW-powered cars during this season: Brabham-Ford was classified 9th.

== See also ==
- Williams FW07
- Lotus 88
