= 1982 Canadian Grand Prix =

- Race 8 of 16 in the 1982 Formula One World Championship
- Circuit Gilles Villeneuve

Race details
- Date: 13 June 1982
- Official name: XXI Grand Prix du Canada
- Location: Circuit Gilles Villeneuve; Montreal, Quebec, Canada
- Course: Temporary street circuit
- Course length: 4.410 km (2.740 miles)
- Distance: 70 laps, 308.700 km (191.817 miles)
- Weather: Overcast and chilly 17 °C (63 °F)

Pole position
Driver	(France) Didier Pironi	Ferrari
- Time: 1:27.509

Fastest lap
Driver	(France) Didier Pironi	Ferrari
- Time: 1:28.323 on lap 66

Podium
First	(Brazil) Nelson Piquet	Brabham-BMW
Second	(Italy) Riccardo Patrese	Brabham-Ford
Third	(United Kingdom) John Watson	McLaren-Ford

The 1982 Canadian Grand Prix was a Formula One motor race held at Circuit Gilles Villeneuve on 13 June 1982. It was the eighth race of the 1982 Formula One World Championship. This was the first Canadian Grand Prix to be held in June, the organisers having moved the race from the autumn to allow for warmer weather; with the exception of 1987, 2009, 2020 and 2021, it continued to be held in June every year until 2025 when the following year, the race was moved to May.

The 70-lap race was won by Nelson Piquet, driving a Brabham-BMW. It was the first Formula One victory for a BMW-engined car, but the only victory of the season for defending Drivers' Champion Piquet. Team-mate Riccardo Patrese finished second in an older Brabham-Ford, with John Watson third in a McLaren-Ford.

== Death of Riccardo Paletti ==
The race was marred by the death of Italian driver Riccardo Paletti, in only his second F1 race start. At the start, the lights took an unusually long time to turn to green. During this time, Didier Pironi, who had the pole position, stalled the engine of his Ferrari. Pironi lifted his hand to signal the problem just as the lights switched to green, which was too late to abort the start. The other cars swerved across the track, trying to squeeze past Pironi's stationary car. Raul Boesel just clipped the back left of the Ferrari, spinning his March into the path of Eliseo Salazar and Jochen Mass. Salazar, Boesel and Mass suffered minor impacts but it looked as if everyone had passed the Ferrari without serious consequences. However, Paletti could not react in time and slammed into the rear of the stranded Ferrari at 180 km/h (110 mph), catapulting it into the path of Geoff Lees. The Osella's nose was crushed in severely.

Due to the force of the severe impact, Paletti sustained heavy chest injuries and was lying unconscious in his car, wedged against the steering wheel. Didier Pironi and Sid Watkins, the FIA's head doctor, were on the scene to stabilise and assist Paletti. As Watkins climbed over the wreckage of the Osella, the petrol from the fuel tank ignited, enveloping the car in a wall of fire. When the fire was finally put out, the injured Paletti was without a pulse. It took the rescue workers 25 minutes to cut him out safely from his wrecked car, as the sparks caused by the cutting equipment threatened to re-ignite the petrol on the track. He was flown by a medical helicopter to the Royal Victoria Hospital, where he died soon after arriving. His mother was watching from the stands, as they were to celebrate his 24th birthday later that week. Paletti suffered a torn aorta as well as fractures to both legs. According to track doctor Jacques Bouchard his pupils were already dilated (indicating brain death) when medical personnel arrived and that the extended extraction time made no difference to his chances of survival. Paletti was the last driver to lose his life in a Formula One car until Elio de Angelis was killed while testing for Brabham at the Circuit Paul Ricard in France in 1986, and was the last fatality at a Formula One race weekend until Roland Ratzenberger at the 1994 San Marino Grand Prix.

== Classification ==
=== Qualifying ===
Pos	No	Driver	Constructor	Q1	Q2	Gap
1	28	(France) Didier Pironi	Ferrari	1:31.332	1:27.509	—
2	16	(France) René Arnoux	Renault	1:31.494	1:27.895	+0.386
3	15	(France) Alain Prost	Renault	1:32.258	1:28.563	+1.054
4	1	(Brazil) Nelson Piquet	Brabham-BMW	1:32.105	1:28.663	+1.154
5	23	(Italy) Bruno Giacomelli	Alfa Romeo	1:33.136	1:28.740	+1.231
6	7	(United Kingdom) John Watson	McLaren-Ford	1:35.027	1:28.822	+1.313
7	6	(Finland) Keke Rosberg	Williams-Ford	1:30.963	1:28.874	+1.365
8	2	(Italy) Riccardo Patrese	Brabham-Ford	1:31.343	1:28.999	+1.490
9	22	(Italy) Andrea de Cesaris	Alfa Romeo	1:30.286	1:29.183	+1.674
10	11	(Italy) Elio de Angelis	Lotus-Ford	1:33.242	1:29.228	+1.719
11	8	(Austria) Niki Lauda	McLaren-Ford	1:32.246	1:29.544	+2.035
12	25	(United States) Eddie Cheever	Ligier-Matra	1:32.969	1:29.590	+2.081
13	5	(Republic of Ireland) Derek Daly	Williams-Ford	1:31.757	1:29.883	+2.374
14	12	(United Kingdom) Nigel Mansell	Lotus-Ford	1:33.023	1:30.048	+2.539
15	3	(Italy) Michele Alboreto	Tyrrell-Ford	1:32.792	1:30.146	+2.637
16	29	(Switzerland) Marc Surer	Arrows-Ford	1:36.428	1:30.518	+3.090
17	30	(Italy) Mauro Baldi	Arrows-Ford	1:38.956	1:30.599	+3.009
18	31	(France) Jean-Pierre Jarier	Osella-Ford	1:41.588	1:30.717	+3.208
19	26	(France) Jacques Laffite	Ligier-Matra	1:33.664	1:30.946	+3.437
20	14	(Colombia) Roberto Guerrero	Ensign-Ford	1:36.524	1:31.235	+3.726
21	18	(Brazil) Raul Boesel	March-Ford	1:35.573	1:31.759	+4.250
22	17	(Germany) Jochen Mass	March-Ford	1:33.756	1:31.861	+4.352
23	32	(Italy) Riccardo Paletti	Osella-Ford	1:41.020	1:31.901	+4.392
24	10	(Chile) Eliseo Salazar	ATS-Ford	1:39.542	1:32.203	+4.694
25	33	(United Kingdom) Geoff Lees	Theodore-Ford	1:36.359	1:32.205	+4.696
26	4	(United Kingdom) Brian Henton	Tyrrell-Ford	1:39.211	1:32.325	+4.816
27	9	(West Germany) Manfred Winkelhock	ATS-Ford	no time	1:32.359	+4.850
28	19	(Spain) Emilio de Villota	March-Ford	1:37.409	1:34.045	+6.536
29	20	(Brazil) Chico Serra	Fittipaldi-Ford	1:37.678	1:42.730	+10.169

=== Race ===
Pos	No	Driver	Constructor	Tyre	Laps	Time/Retired	Grid	Points
1	1	(Brazil) Nelson Piquet	Brabham-BMW	G	70	1:46:39.577	4	9
2	2	(Italy) Riccardo Patrese	Brabham-Ford	G	70	+ 13.799	8	6
3	7	(United Kingdom) John Watson	McLaren-Ford	M	70	+ 1:01.836	6	4
4	11	(Italy) Elio de Angelis	Lotus-Ford	G	69	+ 1 Lap	10	3
5	29	(Switzerland) Marc Surer	Arrows-Ford	P	69	+ 1 Lap	16	2
6	22	(Italy) Andrea de Cesaris	Alfa Romeo	M	68	Out of Fuel	9	1
7	5	(Republic of Ireland) Derek Daly	Williams-Ford	G	68	Out of Fuel	13	
8	30	(Italy) Mauro Baldi	Arrows-Ford	P	68	+ 2 Laps	17	
9	28	(France) Didier Pironi	Ferrari	G	67	+ 3 Laps	1	
10	25	(United States) Eddie Cheever	Ligier-Matra	M	66	Out of Fuel	12	
11	17	(West Germany) Jochen Mass	March-Ford	A	66	+ 4 Laps	22	
NC	4	(United Kingdom) Brian Henton	Tyrrell-Ford	G	59	+ 11 Laps	26	
Ret	6	(Finland) Keke Rosberg	Williams-Ford	G	52	Gearbox	7	
Ret	18	(Brazil) Raul Boesel	March-Ford	A	47	Engine	21	
Ret	3	(Italy) Michele Alboreto	Tyrrell-Ford	G	41	Engine	15	
Ret	15	(France) Alain Prost	Renault	M	30	Engine	3	
Ret	16	(France) René Arnoux	Renault	M	28	Spun Off	2	
Ret	10	(Chile) Eliseo Salazar	ATS-Ford	M	20	Engine	24	
Ret	8	(Austria) Niki Lauda	McLaren-Ford	M	17	Clutch	11	
Ret	26	(France) Jacques Laffite	Ligier-Matra	M	8	Fuel System	19	
Ret	14	(Colombia) Roberto Guerrero	Ensign-Ford	M	2	Clutch	20	
Ret	23	(Italy) Bruno Giacomelli	Alfa Romeo	M	1	Collision	5	
Ret	12	(United Kingdom) Nigel Mansell	Lotus-Ford	G	1	Collision	14	
Ret	31	(France) Jean-Pierre Jarier	Osella-Ford	P	0	Withdrew after teammate's fatal collision	18	
Ret	32	(Italy) Riccardo Paletti	Osella-Ford	P	0	Fatal collision on first start	23	
Ret	33	(United Kingdom) Geoff Lees	Theodore-Ford	G	0	Collision on first start	25	
DNQ	9	(West Germany) Manfred Winkelhock	ATS-Ford	M				
DNQ	19	(Spain) Emilio de Villota	March-Ford	A				
DNQ	20	(Brazil) Chico Serra	Fittipaldi-Ford	P				

== Notes ==
- This was the 1st Grand Prix win and podium finish for a BMW-powered car.

== Championship standings after the race ==
Drivers' Championship standings

Pos	Driver	Points
1	(United Kingdom) John Watson	30
2	(France) Didier Pironi	20
3	(Italy) Riccardo Patrese	19
4	(France) Alain Prost	18
5	(Finland) Keke Rosberg	17

Constructors' Championship standings

Pos	Constructor	Points
1	(United Kingdom) McLaren-Ford	42
2	(Italy) Ferrari	26
3	(United Kingdom) Williams-Ford	26
4	(France) Renault	22
5	(United Kingdom) Brabham-Ford	19

- Note: Only the top five positions are included for both sets of standings.

Previous race: 1982 Detroit Grand Prix	FIA Formula One World Championship; 1982 season	Next race: 1982 Dutch Grand Prix
Previous race: 1981 Canadian Grand Prix	Canadian Grand Prix	Next race: 1983 Canadian Grand Prix
