= 1982 French Grand Prix =

- Race 11 of 16 in the 1982 Formula One World Championship
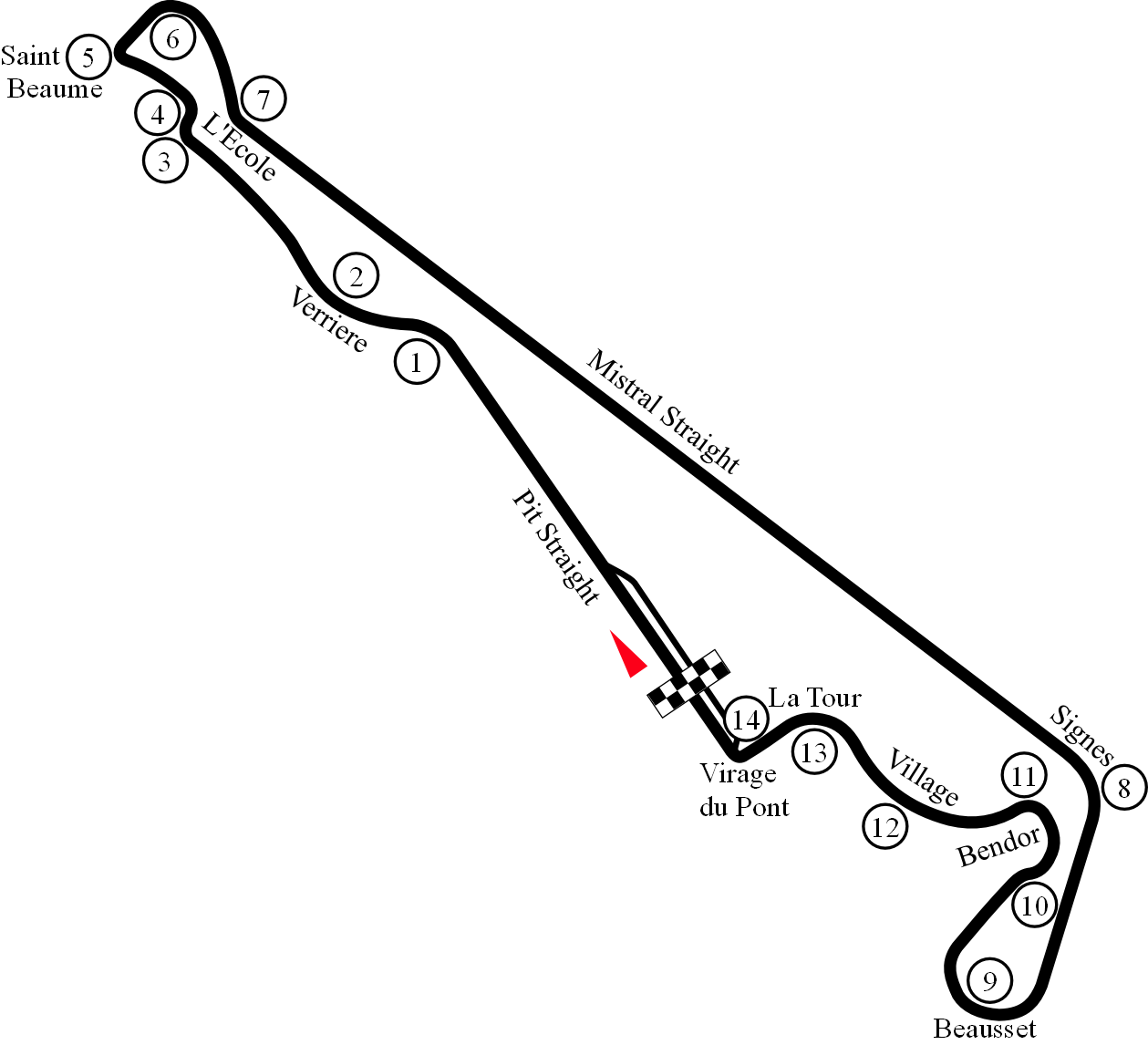

Race details
- Date: 25 July 1982
- Official name: 68ème Grand Prix de France
- Location: Circuit Paul Ricard; Le Castellet, Var, France
- Course: Permanent racing facility
- Course length: 5.809 km (3.610 miles)
- Distance: 54 laps, 313.686 km (194.915 miles)
- Weather: Dry

Pole position
Driver	(France) René Arnoux	Renault
- Time: 1:34.406

Fastest lap
Driver	(Italy) Riccardo Patrese	Brabham-BMW
- Time: 1:40.075 on lap 4

Podium
First	(France) René Arnoux	Renault
Second	(France) Alain Prost	Renault
Third	(France) Didier Pironi	Ferrari

The 1982 French Grand Prix was a Formula One motor race held at Paul Ricard on 25 July 1982. It was the eleventh race of the 1982 Formula One World Championship.

The 54-lap race was won from pole position by René Arnoux, driving a Renault. The turbocharged Renaults, Ferraris and Brabham-BMWs took up the first six grid positions, and Arnoux led home a French 1–2–3–4, with teammate Alain Prost second and the Ferraris of Didier Pironi and Patrick Tambay third and fourth, respectively. Arnoux achieved his win in sour circumstances, as he violated a pre-race agreement that if he and Prost were running first and second, respectively, he would let Prost past to aid his Drivers' Championship hopes. Arnoux left Renault at the end of the year.

The top six was completed by Keke Rosberg in the Williams-Ford and Michele Alboreto in the Tyrrell-Ford. Pironi's third place enabled him to extend his lead in the Drivers' Championship to nine points, although this would turn out to be his last finish before his career-ending accident at the next race in Germany.

The eleventh lap of this race saw a big accident when Jochen Mass's March and Mauro Baldi's Arrows collided at Signes. Mass's car went through the catch fencing into the tyre walls, then catapulted into a spectator area and caught fire. Mass escaped with burns on his hands, while several spectators were injured. The West German driver retired from Formula One immediately after this race.

== Classification ==
=== Qualifying ===
Pos	No	Driver	Constructor	Q1	Q2	Gap
1	16	(France) René Arnoux	Renault	1:36.548	1:34.406	—
2	15	(France) Alain Prost	Renault	1:35.802	1:34.688	+0.282
3	28	(France) Didier Pironi	Ferrari	1:36.477	1:35.790	+1.384
4	2	(Italy) Riccardo Patrese	Brabham-BMW	1:38.541	1:35.811	+1.405
5	27	(France) Patrick Tambay	Ferrari	1:38.745	1:35.905	+1.499
6	1	(Brazil) Nelson Piquet	Brabham-BMW	1:37.162	1:36.359	+1.953
7	22	(Italy) Andrea de Cesaris	Alfa Romeo	1:38.996	1:37.573	+3.167
8	23	(Italy) Bruno Giacomelli	Alfa Romeo	1:38.997	1:37.705	+3.299
9	8	(Austria) Niki Lauda	McLaren-Ford	1:37.778	1:38.034	+3.372
10	6	(Finland) Keke Rosberg	Williams-Ford	1:37.780	1:38.865	+3.374
11	5	(Republic of Ireland) Derek Daly	Williams-Ford	1:38.767	1:39.641	+4.361
12	7	(United Kingdom) John Watson	McLaren-Ford	1:38.944	1:39.150	+4.538
13	11	(Italy) Elio de Angelis	Lotus-Ford	1:40.569	1:39.118	+4.712
14	35	(United Kingdom) Derek Warwick	Toleman-Hart	1:41.266	1:39.306	+4.900
15	3	(Italy) Michele Alboreto	Tyrrell-Ford	1:39.823	1:39.330	+4.924
16	26	(France) Jacques Laffite	Ligier-Matra	1:40.326	1:39.605	+5.199
17	31	(France) Jean-Pierre Jarier	Osella-Ford	1:40.370	1:39.909	+5.503
18	9	(West Germany) Manfred Winkelhock	ATS-Ford	1:39.917	1:39.942	+5.511
19	25	(United States) Eddie Cheever	Ligier-Matra	1:41.518	1:40.187	+5.781
20	29	(Switzerland) Marc Surer	Arrows-Ford	1:42.603	1:40.335	+5.929
21	36	(Italy) Teo Fabi	Toleman-Hart	no time	1:40.421	+6.015
22	10	(Chile) Eliseo Salazar	ATS-Ford	1:42.822	1:40.673	+6.267
23	4	(United Kingdom) Brian Henton	Tyrrell-Ford	1:41.109	1:40.852	+6.446
24	12	(United Kingdom) Geoff Lees	Lotus-Ford	1:45.647	1:40.974	+6.568
25	30	(Italy) Mauro Baldi	Arrows-Ford	1:42.162	1:40.997	+6.591
26	17	(Germany) Jochen Mass	March-Ford	1:41.973	1:41.579	+7.173
27	33	(Netherlands) Jan Lammers	Theodore-Ford	1:41.924	1:41.714	+7.308
28	14	(Colombia) Roberto Guerrero	Ensign-Ford	1:42.270	1:42.532	+7.864
29	20	(Brazil) Chico Serra	Fittipaldi-Ford	1:43.562	1:42.414	+8.008
30	18	(Brazil) Raul Boesel	March-Ford	1:43.515	1:43.099	+8.693

=== Race ===
Pos	No	Driver	Constructor	Tyre	Laps	Time/Retired	Grid	Points
1	16	(France) René Arnoux	Renault	MI	54	1:33:33.217	1	9
2	15	(France) Alain Prost	Renault	MI	54	+ 17.308	2	6
3	28	(France) Didier Pironi	Ferrari	G	54	+ 42.128	3	4
4	27	(France) Patrick Tambay	Ferrari	G	54	+ 1:16.241	5	3
5	6	(Finland) Keke Rosberg	Williams-Ford	G	54	+ 1:30.994	10	2
6	3	(Italy) Michele Alboreto	Tyrrell-Ford	G	54	+ 1:32.339	15	1
7	5	(Republic of Ireland) Derek Daly	Williams-Ford	G	53	+ 1 Lap	11	
8	8	(Austria) Niki Lauda	McLaren-Ford	MI	53	+ 1 Lap	9	
9	23	(Italy) Bruno Giacomelli	Alfa Romeo	MI	53	+ 1 Lap	8	
10	4	(United Kingdom) Brian Henton	Tyrrell-Ford	G	53	+ 1 Lap	23	
11	9	(West Germany) Manfred Winkelhock	ATS-Ford	MI	52	+ 2 Laps	18	
12	12	(United Kingdom) Geoff Lees	Lotus-Ford	G	52	+ 2 Laps	24	
13	29	(Switzerland) Marc Surer	Arrows-Ford	P	52	+ 2 Laps	20	
14	26	(France) Jacques Laffite	Ligier-Matra	MI	51	+ 3 Laps	16	
15	35	(United Kingdom) Derek Warwick	Toleman-Hart	P	50	+ 4 Laps	14	
16	25	(United States) Eddie Cheever	Ligier-Matra	MI	49	+ 5 Laps	19	
Ret	22	(Italy) Andrea de Cesaris	Alfa Romeo	MI	25	Spun Off	7	
Ret	1	(Brazil) Nelson Piquet	Brabham-BMW	G	23	Engine	6	
Ret	11	(Italy) Elio de Angelis	Lotus-Ford	G	17	Fuel System	13	
Ret	7	(United Kingdom) John Watson	McLaren-Ford	MI	13	Electrical	12	
Ret	17	(West Germany) Jochen Mass	March-Ford	A	10	Collision	26	
Ret	30	(Italy) Mauro Baldi	Arrows-Ford	P	10	Collision	25	
Ret	2	(Italy) Riccardo Patrese	Brabham-BMW	G	8	Engine	4	
Ret	10	(Chile) Eliseo Salazar	ATS-Ford	MI	2	Spun Off	22	
Ret	31	(France) Jean-Pierre Jarier	Osella-Ford	P	0	Halfshaft	17	
Ret	36	(Italy) Teo Fabi	Toleman-Hart	P	0	Electrical	21	
DNQ	33	(Netherlands) Jan Lammers	Theodore-Ford	G				
DNQ	14	(Colombia) Roberto Guerrero	Ensign-Ford	MI				
DNQ	20	(Brazil) Chico Serra	Fittipaldi-Ford	P				
DNQ	18	(Brazil) Raul Boesel	March-Ford	A				

== Notes ==
- This race marked the 25th Grand Prix win for a French driver.
- This was the 25th pole position and 10th Grand Prix win for Renault and a Renault-powered car.
- This was the 1st fastest lap set by a BMW-powered car.
- Last race for Didier Pironi and Jochen Mass

== Championship standings after the race ==
Drivers' Championship standings

Pos	Driver	Points
1	(France) Didier Pironi	39
2	(United Kingdom) John Watson	30
3	(France) Alain Prost	25
4	(Austria) Niki Lauda	24
5	(Finland) Keke Rosberg	23

Constructors' Championship standings

Pos	Constructor	Points
1	(United Kingdom) McLaren-Ford	54
2	(Italy) Ferrari	52
3	(France) Renault	38
4	(United Kingdom) Williams-Ford	36
5	(United Kingdom) Lotus-Ford	20

- Note: Only the top five positions are included for both sets of standings.

Previous race: 1982 British Grand Prix	FIA Formula One World Championship; 1982 season	Next race: 1982 German Grand Prix
Previous race: 1981 French Grand Prix	French Grand Prix	Next race: 1983 French Grand Prix
