= 1979 Canadian Grand Prix =

- Race 14 of 15 in the 1979 Formula One season

Race details
- Date: 30 September 1979
- Location: Circuit Île Notre-Dame, Montreal
- Course: Semi-permanent racing facility
- Course length: 4.500 km (2.796 miles)
- Distance: 72 laps, 324.000 km (201.324 miles)
- Weather: Partially cloudy, mild and dry with temperatures reaching up to 21 °C (70 °F); wind speeds up to 18.3 kilometres per hour (11.4 mph)

Pole position
Driver	(Australia) Alan Jones	Williams-Ford
- Time: 1:29.892

Fastest lap
Driver	(Australia) Alan Jones	Williams-Ford
- Time: 1:31.272 on lap 65

Podium
First	(Australia) Alan Jones	Williams-Ford
Second	(Canada) Gilles Villeneuve	Ferrari
Third	(Switzerland) Clay Regazzoni	Williams-Ford

The 1979 Canadian Grand Prix was a Formula One motor race held on 30 September 1979 at the Circuit Île Notre-Dame, Montreal.

During practice Niki Lauda announced his retirement from Formula One (he subsequently returned in 1982 with McLaren). The Brabham team, who had replaced their Alfa Romeo-engined BT48 with the Cosworth DFV-engined BT49, recruited Argentine newcomer Ricardo Zunino as Lauda's replacement.

The organizers would not let the Alfa Romeo factory team compete unless they pre-qualified. They refused to do so but a compromise was reached where one of their drivers would be allowed to take part in practice. The other, Bruno Giacomelli, was not allowed to enter the race.

The race turned into a close duel between Alan Jones and Gilles Villeneuve that continued the entire race.

As of 2024, Regazzoni's podium remains the last for a Swiss driver in Formula One.

== Qualifying ==
=== Qualifying classification ===
Pos.	Driver	Constructor	Time	No
1	Alan Jones	Williams-Ford	1:29.892	1
2	Gilles Villeneuve	Ferrari	1:30.554	2
3	Clay Regazzoni	Williams-Ford	1:30.768	3
4	Nelson Piquet	Brabham-Ford	1:30.775	4
5	Jacques Laffite	Ligier-Ford	1:30.820	5
6	Didier Pironi	Tyrrell-Ford	1:31.941	6
7	Jean-Pierre Jabouille	Renault	1:32.103	7
8	René Arnoux	Renault	1:32.116	8
9	Jody Scheckter	Ferrari	1:32.280	9
10	Mario Andretti	Lotus-Ford	1:32.651	10
11	Carlos Reutemann	Lotus-Ford	1:32.682	11
12	Hans-Joachim Stuck	ATS-Ford	1:32.858	12
13	Jean-Pierre Jarier	Tyrrell-Ford	1:33.065	13
14	Riccardo Patrese	Arrows-Ford	1:33.090	14
15	Emerson Fittipaldi	Fittipaldi-Ford	1:33.297	15
16	Jacky Ickx	Ligier-Ford	1:33.355	16
17	John Watson	McLaren-Ford	1:33.362	17
18	Vittorio Brambilla	Alfa Romeo	1:33.378	18
19	Ricardo Zunino	Brabham-Ford	1:33.511	19
20	Patrick Tambay	McLaren-Ford	1:33.603	20
21	Jan Lammers	Shadow-Ford	1:34.102	21
22	Héctor Rebaque	Rebaque-Ford	1:34.129	22
23	Elio de Angelis	Shadow-Ford	1:34.256	23
24	Derek Daly	Tyrrell-Ford	1:34.301	24
DNQ	Jochen Mass	Arrows-Ford	1:34.365	—
DNQ	Marc Surer	Ensign-Ford	1:34.747	—
DNQ	Keke Rosberg	Wolf-Ford	1:35.061	—
DNQ	Alex Ribeiro	Fittipaldi-Ford	1:36.901	—
DNQ	Arturo Merzario	Merzario-Ford	1:37.590	—

== Race ==
=== Classification ===
Pos	No	Driver	Constructor	Tyre	Laps	Time/Retired	Grid	Points
1	27	(Australia) Alan Jones	Williams-Ford	G	72	1:52:06.892	1	9
2	12	(Canada) Gilles Villeneuve	Ferrari	MI	72	+ 1.080	2	6
3	28	(Switzerland) Clay Regazzoni	Williams-Ford	G	72	+ 1:13.656	3	4
4	11	(South Africa) Jody Scheckter	Ferrari	MI	71	+ 1 lap	9	3
5	3	(France) Didier Pironi	Tyrrell-Ford	G	71	+ 1 lap	6	2
6	7	(United Kingdom) John Watson	McLaren-Ford	G	70	+ 2 laps	17	1
7	5	(Argentina) Ricardo Zunino	Brabham-Ford	G	68	+ 4 laps	19	
8	14	(Brazil) Emerson Fittipaldi	Fittipaldi-Ford	G	67	+ 5 laps	15	
9	17	(Netherlands) Jan Lammers	Shadow-Ford	G	67	+ 5 laps	21	
10	1	(United States) Mario Andretti	Lotus-Ford	G	66	Out of fuel	10	
Ret	6	(Brazil) Nelson Piquet	Brabham-Ford	G	61	Gearbox	4	
Ret	36	(Italy) Vittorio Brambilla	Alfa Romeo	G	52	Fuel system	18	
Ret	25	(Belgium) Jacky Ickx	Ligier-Ford	G	47	Gearbox	16	
Ret	4	(France) Jean-Pierre Jarier	Tyrrell-Ford	G	33	Engine	13	
Ret	33	(Republic of Ireland) Derek Daly	Tyrrell-Ford	G	28	Engine	24	
Ret	31	(Mexico) Héctor Rebaque	Rebaque-Ford	G	26	Chassis	22	
Ret	15	(France) Jean-Pierre Jabouille	Renault	MI	24	Brakes	7	
Ret	18	(Italy) Elio de Angelis	Shadow-Ford	G	24	Ignition	23	
Ret	2	(Argentina) Carlos Reutemann	Lotus-Ford	G	23	Suspension	11	
Ret	29	(Italy) Riccardo Patrese	Arrows-Ford	G	20	Spun off	14	
Ret	8	(France) Patrick Tambay	McLaren-Ford	G	19	Engine	20	
Ret	16	(France) René Arnoux	Renault	MI	14	Accident	8	
Ret	9	(West Germany) Hans-Joachim Stuck	ATS-Ford	G	14	Accident	12	
Ret	26	(France) Jacques Laffite	Ligier-Ford	G	10	Engine	5	
DNQ	30	(West Germany) Jochen Mass	Arrows-Ford	G				
DNQ	22	(Switzerland) Marc Surer	Ensign-Ford	G				
DNQ	20	(Finland) Keke Rosberg	Wolf-Ford	G				
DNQ	19	(Brazil) Alex Ribeiro	Fittipaldi-Ford	G				
DNQ	24	(Italy) Arturo Merzario	Merzario-Ford	G				
WD	5	(Austria) Niki Lauda	Brabham-Ford	G		Retired in practice		

== Notes ==
- This was the Formula One World Championship debut for Argentinian driver Ricardo Zunino.
- This was the 5th fastest lap, 5th Grand Prix win, 1st Hat Trick, and 10th and 11th podium finish for Williams.

== Championship standings after the race ==
Drivers' Championship standings

	Pos	Driver	Points
	1	(South Africa) **Jody Scheckter**	51 (60)
	2	(Canada) Gilles Villeneuve	44
1	3	(Australia) Alan Jones	40 (43)
1	4	(France) Jacques Laffite	36
	5	(Switzerland) Clay Regazzoni	29 (32)

Constructors' Championship standings

Pos	Constructor	Points
1	(Italy) **Ferrari**	104
2	(United Kingdom) Williams-Ford	75
3	(France) Ligier-Ford	61
4	(United Kingdom) Lotus-Ford	39
5	(United Kingdom) Tyrrell-Ford	24

- Note: Only the top five positions are included for both sets of standings. Only the best 4 results from the first 7 races and the best 4 results from the last 8 races counted towards the Drivers' Championship. Numbers without parentheses are Championship points; numbers in parentheses are total points scored.
- **Bold text** indicates the 1979 World Champions.

Previous race: 1979 Italian Grand Prix	FIA Formula One World Championship; 1979 season	Next race: 1979 United States Grand Prix
Previous race: 1978 Canadian Grand Prix	Canadian Grand Prix	Next race: 1980 Canadian Grand Prix
