= Brabham BT48 =

Formula One racing car

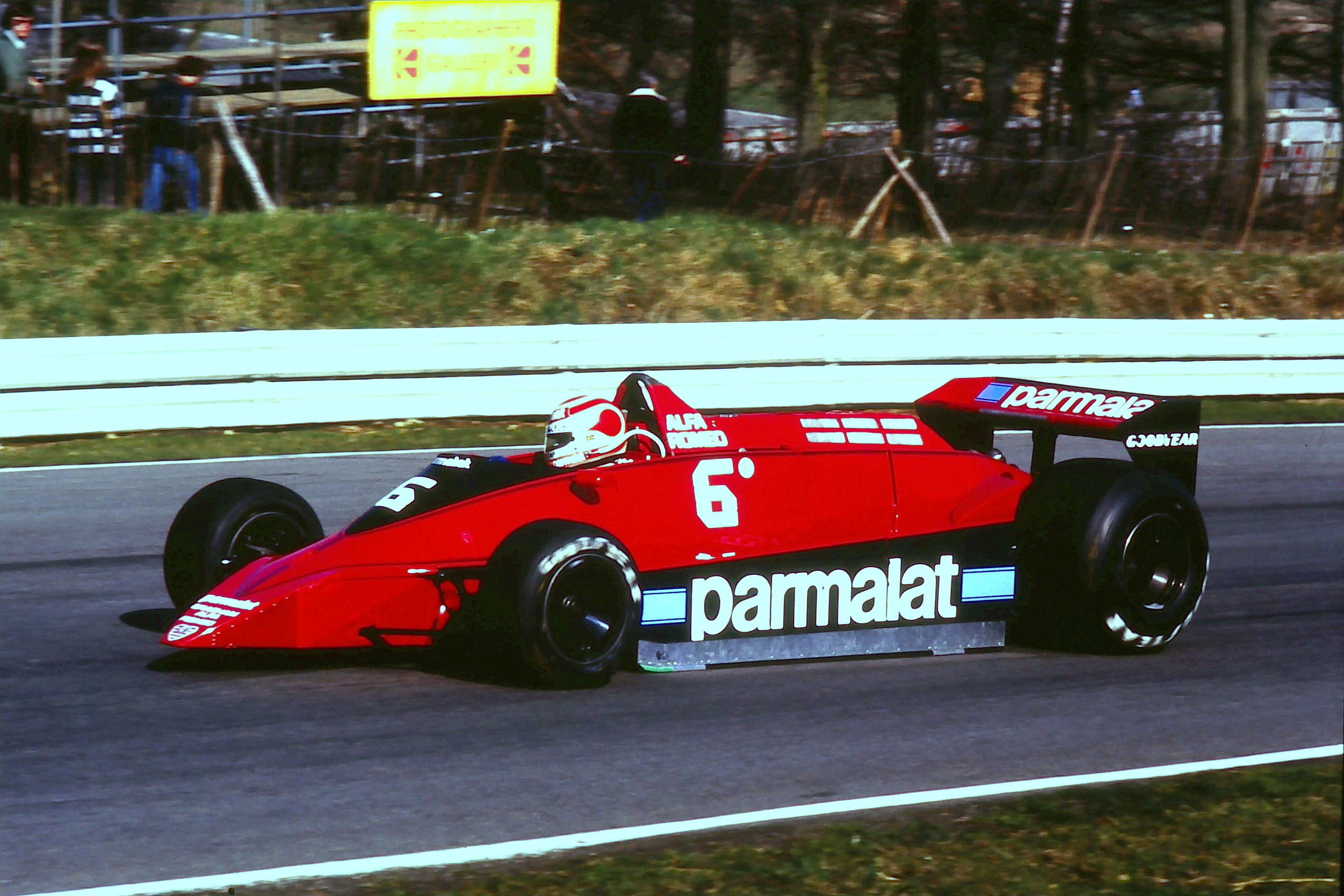
- Category: Formula One
- Constructor: Brabham
- Designers: Gordon Murray (Technical Director); David North (Chief Designer); Carlo Chiti (Chief Engine Designer (Alfa Romeo))
- Predecessor: BT46
- Successor: BT49

Technical specifications
- Chassis: Aluminium monocoque
- Axle track: Front: 1,731 mm (68.1 in); Rear: 1,625 mm (64.0 in)
- Wheelbase: 2,743 mm (108.0 in)
- Engine: Alfa Romeo, 2,991 cc (182.5 cu in), 60° V12, NA, mid-engine, longitudinally mounted
- Transmission: Hewland / Alfa Romeo 5/6-speed manual
- Fuel: Agip
- Tyres: Goodyear

Competition history
- Notable entrants: Parmalat Racing Brabham
- Notable drivers: 5. (Austria) Niki Lauda; 6. (Brazil) Nelson Piquet
- Debut: 1979 Argentine Grand Prix
Races	Wins	Poles	F/Laps
13	0	0	0
- Constructors' Championships: 0
- Drivers' Championships: 0

The Brabham BT48 was a Formula One racing car designed by Gordon Murray and raced by the Brabham team in the 1979 Formula One season.

The intended plan was to run the BT47 but the FIA outlawed it because it had a Chaparral 2J-type box rear end with twin variable geometry fans on the rear to maximize ground effect, so Murray designed the BT48 instead.

== Racing history ==
The BT48 made its debut at the 1979 Argentine Grand Prix with Niki Lauda driving. Teammate Nelson Piquet qualified the older Brabham BT46 in 20th place. Lauda qualified the BT46 in 23rd place but drove the BT48 in the race when he retired with fuel system failure. Piquet was involved in a huge first lap pile-up and was injured; he did not take the restart.

At Brazil, Brabham had another BT48 ready for home favorite Piquet. The Austrian qualified 12th and the Brazilian 22nd. Lauda retired with a broken gearbox and the Brazilian retired at his home race after colliding with Clay Regazzoni. At the South African Grand Prix, Lauda qualified fourth and Piquet 12th. The Austrian finished sixth and the Brazilian seventh. At the United States Grand Prix West, Lauda qualified 11th and Piquet 12th, The Austrian retired when Patrick Tambay's McLaren hit him and the Brazilian finished eighth.

At the Spanish Grand Prix Lauda qualified sixth and Piquet seventh. The Austrian retired with a water leak and the Brazilian retired with broken injection. At Belgium, Piquet qualified third and Lauda 13th, but both retired with engine failure. The Monaco Grand Prix saw Lauda qualify fourth and Piquet 18th. The Austrian retired with an accident, and the Brazilian retired with transmission failure. At France, Piquet qualified fourth and Lauda sixth. The Brazilian retired with an accident and the Austrian retired when he spun. At the British Grand Prix, Piquet qualified third and Lauda fifth. The Brazilian retired when he spun and the Austrian retired when his brakes failed. At Germany, Piquet qualified fourth and Lauda seventh, but both retired with engine failure. The Austrian Grand Prix saw Lauda qualify fourth and Piquet seventh, but both retired with engine failure, disappointing the Austrian fans at Lauda's home race.

At the Dutch Grand Prix, Lauda qualified ninth and Piquet 11th. The Austrian withdrew on Lap four and the Brazilian finished fourth. The Italian Grand Prix saw Piquet qualify eighth and Lauda ninth. The Brazilian retired with an accident and the Austrian Finished fourth. At the Canadian Grand Prix, after a second season marred by retirements and poor pace, Lauda informed Brabham that he wished to retire immediately, as he had no more desire to "drive around in circles". Lauda, who in the meantime had founded Lauda Air, a charter airline, returned to Austria to run the company full-time. The BT48 was replaced by the Brabham BT49 with a Ford engine for the final two races of 1979.

Although reasonably quick and competitive, the BT48 was a very unreliable car with a very unreliable engine, due to the fact that the Carlo Chiti-designed Alfa V12 engine was very new and had predictable teething troubles. Unreliability was something of an unfortunate hallmark of some of Gordon Murray's Brabham F1 cars. While he won the non-championship Dino Ferrari Grand Prix at the Imola circuit near Bologna, Lauda only finished 2 races he competed in before he announced his retirement in Montreal; and Piquet finished 4 races. A number of these retirements were due to engine failure.

== Complete Formula One World Championship results ==
(key) (Results in bold indicate pole position; results in italics indicate fastest lap)

Year	Entrant	Engine	Drivers	1	2	3	4	5	6	7	8	9	10	11	12	13	14	15	Points	WCC
1979	Parmalat Racing Brabham	Alfa Romeo V12		ARG	BRA	RSA	USW	ESP	BEL	MON	FRA	GBR	GER	AUT	NED	ITA	CAN	USE	**7**	**8th**
1979	Parmalat Racing Brabham	Alfa Romeo V12	Niki Lauda	Ret	Ret	6	Ret	Ret	Ret	Ret	Ret	Ret	Ret	Ret	Ret	4			**7**	**8th**
1979	Parmalat Racing Brabham	Alfa Romeo V12	Nelson Piquet		Ret	7	8	Ret	Ret	Ret	Ret	Ret	12	Ret	4	Ret			**7**	**8th**

== Non-Championship results ==
(key) (Results in bold indicate pole position; results in italics indicate fastest lap)

Year	Entrant	Engine	Drivers	1	2
1979	Parmalat Racing Brabham	Alfa Romeo V12		ROC	DIN
1979	Parmalat Racing Brabham	Alfa Romeo V12	Niki Lauda	5	1
1979	Parmalat Racing Brabham	Alfa Romeo V12	Nelson Piquet	2	
