= 1982 German Grand Prix =

Formula One motor race held in 1982

- Race 12 of 16 in the 1982 Formula One World Championship

Race details
- Date: 8 August 1982
- Official name: XLIV Großer Preis von Deutschland
- Location: Hockenheimring, Hockenheim, West Germany
- Course: Permanent racing facility
- Course length: 6.802 km (4.227 miles)
- Distance: 45 laps, 306.090 km (190.215 miles)
- Weather: Dry

Pole position
Driver	(France) Didier Pironi	Ferrari
- Time: 1:47.947

Fastest lap
Driver	(Brazil) Nelson Piquet	Brabham-BMW
- Time: 1:54.035 on lap 7

Podium
First	(France) Patrick Tambay	Ferrari
Second	(France) René Arnoux	Renault
Third	(Finland) Keke Rosberg	Williams-Ford

The 1982 German Grand Prix was a Formula One motor race held at the Hockenheimring on 8 August 1982. It was the twelfth race of the 1982 Formula One World Championship.

The race was overshadowed by an accident during qualifying in which Drivers' Championship leader Didier Pironi heavily crashed his Ferrari, sustaining severe leg injuries that ultimately ended his Formula One career.

The 45-lap race was won by Pironi's teammate Patrick Tambay, with René Arnoux second in a Renault and Keke Rosberg third in a Williams-Ford.

== Report ==
=== Qualifying ===
Hockenheim had been modified from the year before, with the first chicane being made slower and another chicane added to slow cars through the very fast Ostkurve. Didier Pironi set the fastest practice time, but was seriously injured in qualifying for this Grand Prix and never raced in Formula One again. With the track wet thanks to persistent showers, Pironi was on a quick lap when his Ferrari hit the back of Alain Prost's slow moving Renault at high speed, vaulting over the top of it before landing tail-first and cartwheeling to a stop in eerie similarity to Gilles Villeneuve's fatal accident earlier in the season. Pironi survived but suffered severe leg injuries that sidelined him for the rest of the year. He never managed to return to Formula One and died in 1987. Pironi's accident also had a profound effect on Prost who never forgot the sight of the Ferrari flying over his car, the crash firming his views on the danger of driving Formula One cars in the wet, where visibility was virtually zero when following behind another car.

Thanks to Hockenheim's long straights, the turbocharged cars were overwhelmingly dominant in qualifying. Not only did turbocharged cars take up the first six grid positions, but the utmost proof of this was how Riccardo Patrese, who placed 6th in the turbocharged Brabham-BMW, was 2.9 seconds faster than the fastest non-turbo qualifier, Michele Alboreto in 7th driving a Ford-Cosworth powered Tyrrell. The Toleman pair of Derek Warwick and Teo Fabi could not use the turbocharged Hart engines to their advantage, with Warwick only managing 14th position and Fabi failing to qualify.

=== Race ===
Since Ferrari never withdrew the injured Pironi, pole position was left empty at the start. Nelson Piquet led the race, but collided with Eliseo Salazar while lapping him at the new Ostkurve chicane. Piquet ripped his seatbelt off before his car had stopped moving. After the two cars came to a stop, an irate Piquet quickly climbed out of his Brabham, approached Salazar, and then punched and kicked Salazar in a rage, which continued for some time after the collision. Patrick Tambay, driving the lone Ferrari, won his first Formula One race.

Before his accident, Piquet and his Brabham team had planned to make a pit stop for fuel and tyres, which was unconventional strategy at the time. Using soft qualifying tyres and a smaller load of fuel, Piquet sped away to over a 30-second lead. The plan may have been successful if there were no unforeseen problems.

Several months later, a mechanic revealed that Piquet's BMW engine was suffering from mechanical issues and would have blown up anyway had he not been taken out by the crash. Piquet then phoned Salazar, both to apologize for his outburst and to convey the gratitude of BMW executives, several of whom personally attended the race and were thus spared the embarrassment of witnessing their engine failing at their home country Grand Prix.

== Classification ==
=== Qualifying ===
Pos	No	Driver	Constructor	Q1	Q2	Gap
1	28	(France) Didier Pironi	Ferrari	1:47.947	no time	—
2	15	(France) Alain Prost	Renault	1:48.890	2:07.540	+0.943
3	16	(France) René Arnoux	Renault	1:49.256	2:11.164	+1.309
4	1	(Brazil) Nelson Piquet	Brabham-BMW	1:49.415	2:03.434	+1.468
5	27	(France) Patrick Tambay	Ferrari	1:49.570	2:04.090	+1.623
6	2	(Italy) Riccardo Patrese	Brabham-BMW	1:49.760	no time	+1.813
7	3	(Italy) Michele Alboreto	Tyrrell-Ford	1:52.625	no time	+4.678
8	22	(Italy) Andrea de Cesaris	Alfa Romeo	1:52.786	2:08.873	+4.839
9	6	(Finland) Keke Rosberg	Williams-Ford	1:52.892	2:05.368	+4.945
10	7	(United Kingdom) John Watson	McLaren-Ford	1:53.073	2:07.821	+5.126
11	23	(Italy) Bruno Giacomelli	Alfa Romeo	1:53.887	2:12.280	+5.940
12	25	(United States) Eddie Cheever	Ligier-Matra	1:54.211	no time	+6.264
13	11	(Italy) Elio de Angelis	Lotus-Ford	1:54.476	no time	+6.529
14	35	(United Kingdom) Derek Warwick	Toleman-Hart	1:54.594	no time	+6.647
15	26	(France) Jacques Laffite	Ligier-Matra	1:54.982	no time	+7.035
16	9	(West Germany) Manfred Winkelhock	ATS-Ford	1:55.223	2:11.546	+7.276
17	4	(United Kingdom) Brian Henton	Tyrrell-Ford	1:55.474	2:11.280	+7.527
18	12	(United Kingdom) Nigel Mansell	Lotus-Ford	1:55.866	no time	+7.919
19	5	(Republic of Ireland) Derek Daly	Williams-Ford	1:55.876	2:07.514	+7.929
20	31	(France) Jean-Pierre Jarier	Osella-Ford	1:56.250	2:11.607	+8.303
21	14	(Colombia) Roberto Guerrero	Ensign-Ford	1:56.489	2:14.398	+8.542
22	10	(Chile) Eliseo Salazar	ATS-Ford	1:56.537	2:11.823	+8.590
23	30	(Italy) Mauro Baldi	Arrows-Ford	1:56.680	2:12.107	+8.733
24	18	(Brazil) Raul Boesel	March-Ford	1:57.245	2:13.758	+9.298
25	20	(Brazil) Chico Serra	Fittipaldi-Ford	1:57.337	no time	+9.390
26	29	(Switzerland) Marc Surer	Arrows-Ford	1:57.402	2:10.226	+9.455
27	33	(Republic of Ireland) Tommy Byrne	Theodore-Ford	1:59.007	2:13.032	+11.060
28	17	(United Kingdom) Rupert Keegan	March-Ford	1:59.951	no time	+12.004
29	36	(Italy) Teo Fabi	Toleman-Hart	no time	no time	–
WD	8	(Austria) Niki Lauda	McLaren-Ford	1:52.683	no time	+4.736

=== Race ===
Pos	No	Driver	Constructor	Tyre	Laps	Time/Retired	Grid	Points
1	27	(France) Patrick Tambay	Ferrari	G	45	1:27:25.178	5	9
2	16	(France) René Arnoux	Renault	G	45	+ 16.379	3	6
3	6	(Finland) Keke Rosberg	Williams-Ford	G	44	+ 1 Lap	9	4
4	3	(Italy) Michele Alboreto	Tyrrell-Ford	G	44	+ 1 Lap	7	3
5	23	(Italy) Bruno Giacomelli	Alfa Romeo	G	44	+ 1 Lap	11	2
6	29	(Switzerland) Marc Surer	Arrows-Ford	P	44	+ 1 Lap	26	1
7	4	(United Kingdom) Brian Henton	Tyrrell-Ford	G	44	+ 1 Lap	17	
8	14	(Colombia) Roberto Guerrero	Ensign-Ford	MI	44	+ 1 Lap	21	
9	12	(United Kingdom) Nigel Mansell	Lotus-Ford	G	43	+ 2 Laps	18	
10	35	(United Kingdom) Derek Warwick	Toleman-Hart	P	43	+ 2 Laps	14	
11	20	(Brazil) Chico Serra	Fittipaldi-Ford	P	43	+ 2 Laps	25	
Ret	7	(United Kingdom) John Watson	McLaren-Ford	G	36	Spun Off	10	
Ret	26	(France) Jacques Laffite	Ligier-Matra	G	36	Handling	15	
Ret	5	(Republic of Ireland) Derek Daly	Williams-Ford	G	25	Engine	19	
Ret	18	(Brazil) Raul Boesel	March-Ford	A	22	Tyre	24	
Ret	11	(Italy) Elio de Angelis	Lotus-Ford	G	21	Handling	13	
Ret	1	(Brazil) Nelson Piquet	Brabham-BMW	G	18	Collision	4	
Ret	10	(Chile) Eliseo Salazar	ATS-Ford	MI	17	Collision	22	
Ret	15	(France) Alain Prost	Renault	G	14	Injection	2	
Ret	2	(Italy) Riccardo Patrese	Brabham-BMW	G	13	Engine	6	
Ret	22	(Italy) Andrea de Cesaris	Alfa Romeo	G	9	Gearbox	8	
Ret	25	(United States) Eddie Cheever	Ligier-Matra	G	8	Fuel System	12	
Ret	30	(Italy) Mauro Baldi	Arrows-Ford	P	6	Fuel System	23	
Ret	31	(France) Jean-Pierre Jarier	Osella-Ford	P	3	Steering	20	
Ret	9	(West Germany) Manfred Winkelhock	ATS-Ford	MI	3	Clutch	16	
DNS	28	(France) Didier Pironi	Ferrari	G	0	Practice Accident	1	
DNS	8	(Austria) Niki Lauda	McLaren-Ford	G	0	Withdrew		
DNQ	33	(Republic of Ireland) Tommy Byrne	Theodore-Ford	G				
DNQ	17	(United Kingdom) Rupert Keegan	March-Ford	A				
DNQ	36	(Italy) Teo Fabi	Toleman-Hart	P				

== Notes ==
- This was the Formula One World Championship debut for Irish driver Tommy Byrne.
- This was the 5th Grand Prix start for a Colombian driver.
- This was the 5th podium finish for a Finnish driver.

== Championship standings after the race ==
Drivers' Championship standings

Pos	Driver	Points
1	(France) Didier Pironi	39
2	(United Kingdom) John Watson	30
3	(Finland) Keke Rosberg	27
4	(France) Alain Prost	25
5	(Austria) Niki Lauda	24

Constructors' Championship standings

Pos	Constructor	Points
1	(Italy) Ferrari	61
2	(United Kingdom) McLaren-Ford	54
3	(France) Renault	44
4	(United Kingdom) Williams-Ford	40
5	(United Kingdom) Lotus-Ford	20

- Note: Only the top five positions are included for both sets of standings.

Previous race: 1982 French Grand Prix	FIA Formula One World Championship; 1982 season	Next race: 1982 Austrian Grand Prix
Previous race: 1981 German Grand Prix	German Grand Prix	Next race: 1983 German Grand Prix
