= Jolly Club =

Italian motor racing team

(Italy) Jolly Club
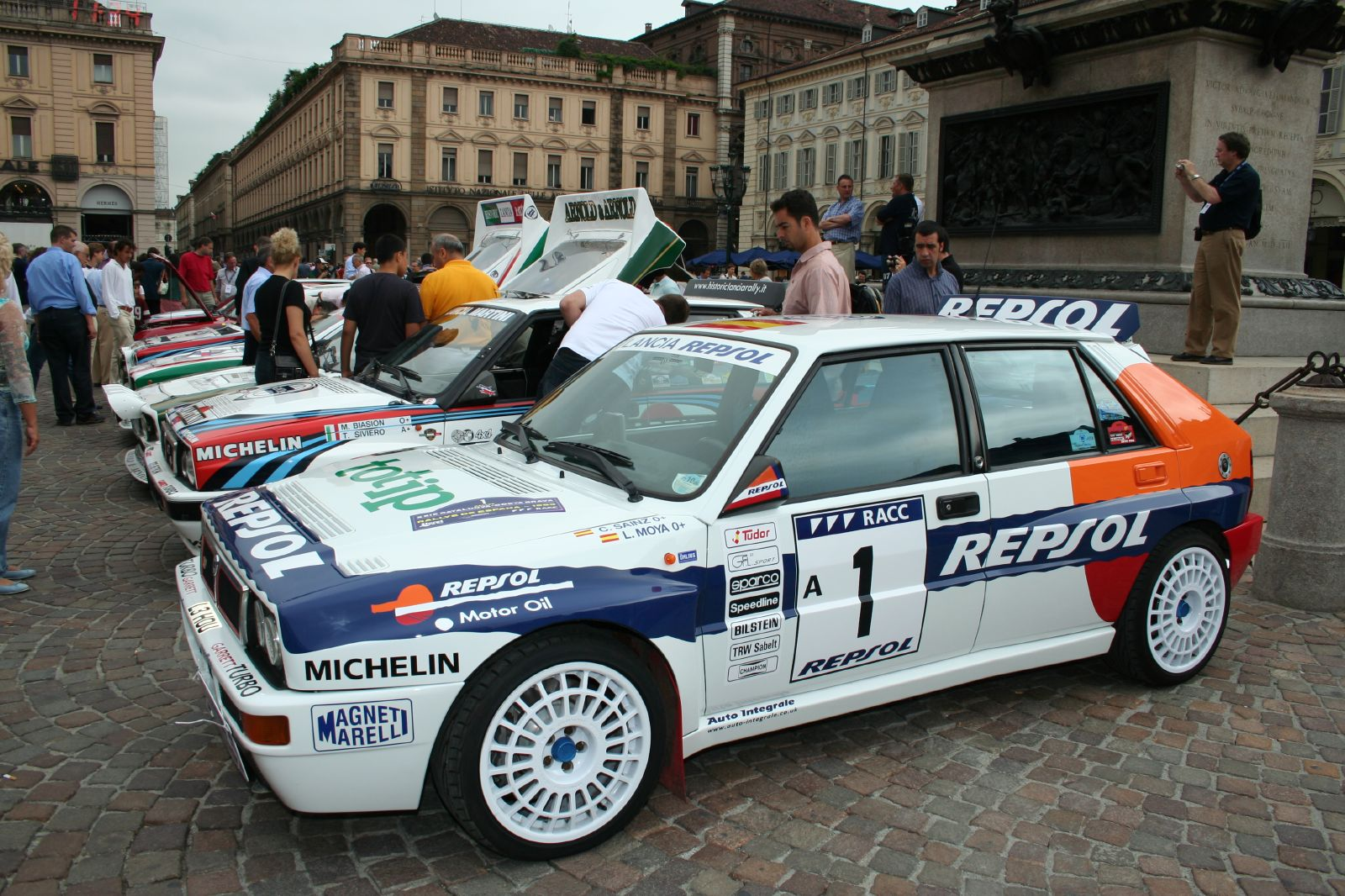
- Carlos Sainz Sr.'s and the Jolly Club's 1993 Lancia Delta HF Integrale in Turin in 2006
- Founded: 1957
- Team principal(s): Andrea Guidi
- Founder(s): Mario Angiolini
- Former series: Italian F3; Italian Rally Championship; European Rally Championship; World Rally Championship; Sportscar World Championship; European Touring Car Championship; BPR Global GT Series; Formula One
- Noted drivers: Alessandro Fiorio; Dario Cerrato; Gianfranco Cunico; Miki Biasion; Sandro Munari; Lele Pinto
- Drivers' Championships: Italian Formula Three Championship: 1965, 1973; Italian Rally Championship: 1982, 1983, 1985, 1986, 1988, 1989, 1990, 1991, 1994, 1995, 1996; European Rally Championship: 1973, 1983, 1985, 1987; Production World Rally Championship: 1987

Jolly Club was an Italian motor racing team, which competed in the Italian Formula Three Championship, the World Rally Championship, the Sportscar World Championship, the European Touring Car Championship, the BPR Global GT Series, and briefly in the Formula One World Championship, along with several domestic championships. It was created in 1957 in Milan by idea of Mario Angiolini, winning several championships, and was mainly connected to brands like Alfa Romeo, Lancia and Ferrari.

The team's main sponsor was Italian gaming totalizer Totip so the cars used orange and green colors on their livery until the 1996 World Rally Championship. They also had a lengthy association with alcoholic beverage company Martini & Rossi.

Gianfranco Cunico won the Italian Rally Championship driving a Ford Escort Cosworth in 1994, 1995, 1996, the 1995 and 1996 cars were built by Malcolm Wilson Motorsport to be run by Jolly Club and sponsored by Martini, one of the most famous teams in the world with one of the most famous sponsors ensured victory.

== Drivers ==
The team's most successful drivers were:

- Alessandro Fiorio, 8 races and World Champion 4WD Group N with a Lancia Delta in 1987.
- Dario Cerrato, 41 runs between the Europeans and Italian Rally Championship, and European Champion in 1985 with a Lancia 037.
- Miki Biasion, 32 races in World and European Rally Championship, and twice World Rally Champion with Martini Racing, also won the 1983 European Rally Championship and the Italian Rally Championship.

The team also competed with other drivers like: Roberto Businello, Arnaldo Cavallari, Sandro Munari, Lele Pinto, Amilcare Balestrieri, Tony Carello, Andrea Zanussi, Gianfranco Cunico, Tonino Tognana (Italian Rally Champion in 1982 with a Ferrari 308 GTB), Adartico Vudafieri (Italian Rally Champion in 1984), Michele Rayneri, and Pavle Komnenović.

The Jolly Club Team was one of the most important rally teams from Italy, as it let a lot of young drivers run. After a bankruptcy in 1997 the Jolly Club closed.

In 2007, the Jolly Club was reborn in Florence, with new ideas by an Italian gentleman and driver, Andrea Guidi. The Trademark is registered from 2007 in the European Economic Community and now the Jolly Club is an organization in TV, Media and Team for Motorsport passionates worldwide.

== Cars ==
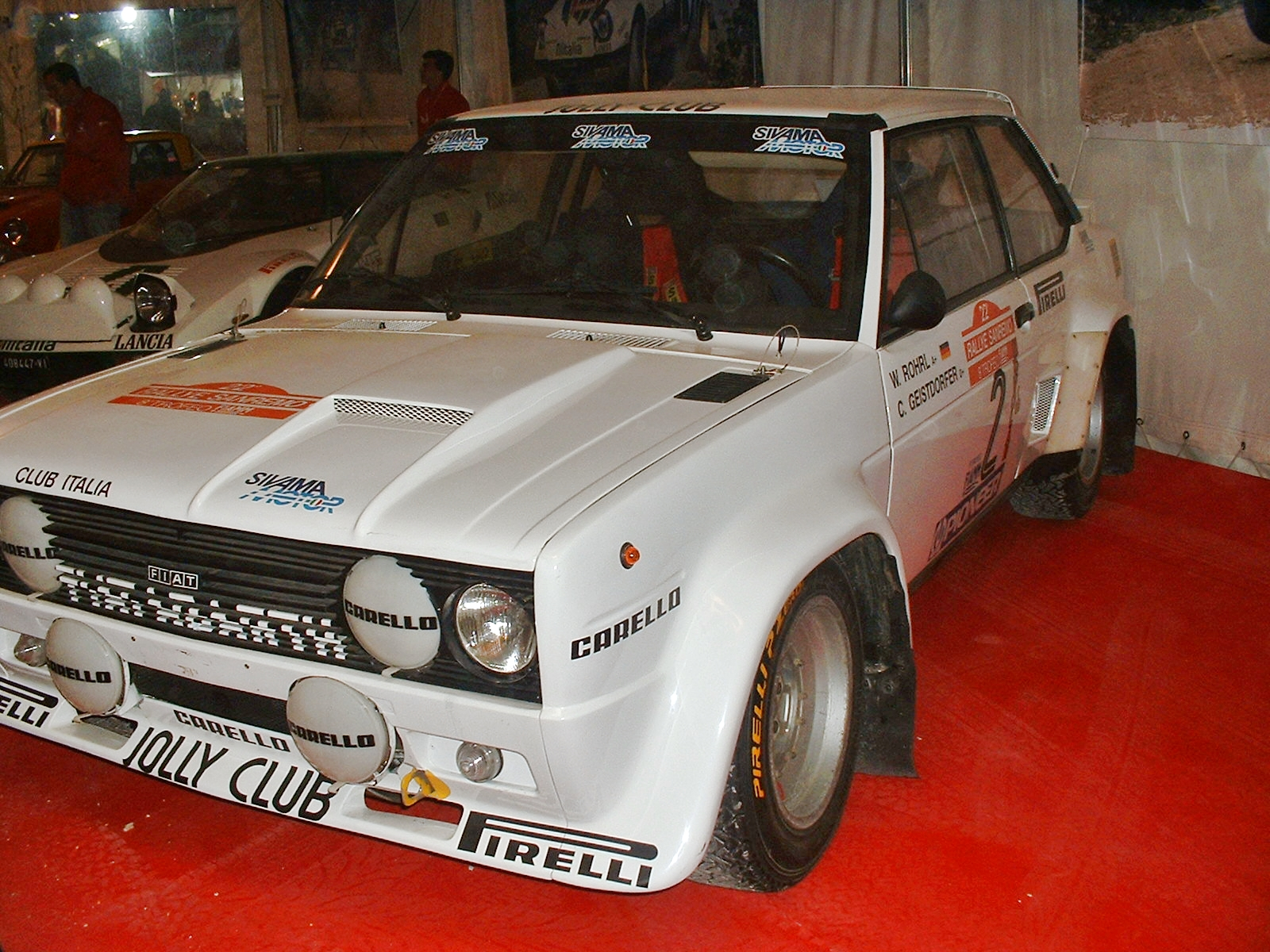
Fiat 131 Abarth of Walter Röhrl, prepared by Jolly Club

Initially Jolly Club cars were mainly Alfa Romeos. Between 1957 and 1963 was used: Alfa Giulietta, TI Giulia Super, GTV 1.6, GTA 1.6. From 1963 team collaborated with Autodelta development and career preparation GT Junior, AM GT, Alfa GTV 2.5 and 75 T. That same year began partnership with Lancia and Fiat Fulvia 2C developing and the Lancia Stratos HF, the team continued his collaboration with Abarth to develop the Fiat 131 Abarth, Lancia Rally, Ritmo, Fiat Uno Turbo, Delta S4 and Delta 4WD. Apart from the rally also developed Formula 1 cars, F2, F3 and Formula Junior, where the team won several times.

The team also collaborated with other brands like Ferrari and Porsche developing prototypes. The Jolly Club team was active in other areas of the world of motor racing developed and planned and financed the young hopefuls, led to the sponsors on their investments, built race cars, engines, parts, etc.

== Complete Formula One World Championship results ==
(key) (Results in bold indicate pole position; results in italics indicate fastest lap)

Year	Chassis	Engine(s)	Tyres	Drivers	1	2	3	4	5	6	7	8	9	10	11	12	13	14	15	16	17
1971	Bellasi F1 70	Cosworth DFV 3.0 V8	G		RSA	ESP	MON	NED	FRA	GBR	GER	AUT	ITA	CAN	USA						
1971	Bellasi F1 70	Cosworth DFV 3.0 V8	G	(Switzerland) Silvio Moser									Ret								
1977	Apollon Fly	Cosworth DFV 3.0 V8	G		ARG	BRA	RSA	USW	ESP	MON	BEL	SWE	FRA	GBR	GER	AUT	NED	ITA	USA	CAN	JPN
1977	Apollon Fly	Cosworth DFV 3.0 V8	G	(Switzerland) Loris Kessel							DNA		DNA			DNA	DNA	DNQ			
1986	AGS JH21C	Motori Moderni Tipo 615-90 1.5 V6t	G		BRA	ESP	SMR	MON	BEL	CAN	DET	FRA	GBR	GER	HUN	AUT	ITA	POR	MEX	AUS	
1986	AGS JH21C	Motori Moderni Tipo 615-90 1.5 V6t	G	(Italy) Ivan Capelli													Ret	Ret			

== WRC results ==
Season	Driver	Vehicle	Victories	Final position	Constructors championship
**Jolly Club**
1993	ESP Carlos Sainz	Lancia Delta HF Integrale	8 / 0	8th	5th
1993	ITA Andrea Aghini	Lancia Delta HF Integrale	5 / 0	14th	5th
1993	URU Gustavo Trelles	Lancia Delta HF Integrale	4 / 0	9th	5th
1991	FRA Didier Auriol	Lancia Delta Integrale 16V	11 / 1	3rd	-

=== WRC Results (Group B era) ===
Year	Car	Driver	1	2	3	4	5	6	7	8	9	10	11	12	13	WDC	Points
1983	Lancia 037	(Italy) Adartico Vudafieri	MON	SWE	POR	KEN	FRA; 3	GRC	NZL	ARG	FIN	ITA; Ret	CIV	GBR		12th	20
1983	Lancia 037	(Italy) Miki Biasion	MON	SWE	POR	KEN	FRA	GRC	NZL	ARG	FIN	ITA; 5	CIV	GBR		21st	8
1983	Lancia 037	(Italy) Tonino Tognana	MON	SWE	POR	KEN	FRA	GRC	NZL	ARG	FIN	ITA; Ret	CIV	GBR		-	0
1984	Lancia 037	(Italy) Miki Biasion	MON; 6	SWE	POR; 4	KEN	FRA; 2	GRC; Ret	NZL	ARG	FIN	ITA; 3	CIV	GBR		6th	43
1984	Lancia 037	(Italy) Adartico Vudafieri	MON	SWE	POR	KEN	FRA; Ret	GRC	NZL	ARG	FIN	ITA; Ret	CIV	GBR		-	0
1985	Lancia 037	(Italy) Miki Biasion	MON; 9	SWE	POR; 2	KEN	FRA; Ret	GRC	NZL	ARG	FIN	ITA; 6	CIV	GBR		12th	23
1985	Lancia 037	(Italy) Dario Cerrato	MON	SWE	POR	KEN	FRA	GRC	NZL	ARG	FIN	ITA; 5	CIV	GBR		25th	8
1986	Lancia Delta S4	(Italy) Dario Cerrato	MON	SWE	POR	KEN	FRA	GRC	NZL	ARG	FIN	CIV	ITA; 2^{[1]}	GBR	USA	-	0

^{1} The results of the 1986 Rallye Sanremo were annulled by the FIA.

=== WRC Results (Group A era) ===
Year	Car	Driver	1	2	3	4	5	6	7	8	9	10	11	12	13	14	WRC	Points
1987	Lancia Delta HF 4WD	(Italy) **Alex Fiorio**	MON; 12	SWE; 20	POR; 13	KEN	FRA	GRC; 20	USA; 11	NZL	ARG	FIN; 11	CIV	ITA; 7	GBR		46th	4
1987	Lancia Delta HF 4WD	(Italy) **Vittorio Caneva**	MON; 87	SWE; 26	POR; Ret	KEN	FRA	GRC; Ret	USA	NZL	ARG	FIN	CIV	ITA; 13	GBR		-	0
1987	Lancia Delta HF 4WD	(Sweden) **Mikael Ericsson**	MON	SWE	POR	KEN	FRA	GRC; Ret	USA	NZL	ARG	FIN	CIV	ITA; 8	GBR		10th	28
1987	Lancia Delta HF 4WD	(Argentina) **Jorge Recalde**	MON	SWE	POR	KEN	FRA	GRC	USA; 7	NZL	ARG	FIN	CIV	ITA	GBR		9th	30
1988	Lancia Delta HF 4WD	(Italy) **Alex Fiorio**	MON; 2	SWE; 11	POR; 2	KEN	FRA	GRC; 3	USA; 2	NZL	ARG	FIN; 7	CIV	ITA; 2	GBR		**3rd**	**76**
1988	Lancia Delta HF 4WD	(France) **Yves Loubet**	MON	SWE	POR; 3	KEN	FRA	GRC; Ret	USA	NZL	ARG	FIN	CIV	ITA; Ret	GBR		10th*	28*
1988	Lancia Delta HF 4WD	(Italy) **Dario Cerrato**	MON	SWE	POR	KEN	FRA	GRC	USA	NZL	ARG	FIN	CIV	ITA; 3	GBR		20th	12
1989	Lancia Delta Integrale	(Italy) **Alex Fiorio**	SWE	MON; Ret	POR; 3	KEN; 10	FRA	GRC; 3	NZL	ARG; 2	FIN	AUS; 4	ITA; 2	CIV	GBR		**2nd**	**65**
1989	Lancia Delta Integrale	(Italy) **Dario Cerrato**	SWE	MON; 7	POR	KEN	FRA	GRC	NZL	ARG	FIN	AUS	ITA; 4	CIV	GBR		23rd	14
1989	Lancia Delta Integrale	(Italy) **Paolo Andreucci**	SWE	MON	POR; 8	KEN	FRA	GRE; Ret	NZL	ARG	FIN	AUS	ITA	CIV	GBR		58th	3
1990	Lancia Delta Integrale 16v	(Italy) **Dario Cerrato**	MON; 4	POR; 4	KEN	FRA	GRC	NZL	ARG	FIN	AUS	ITA; 4	CIV	GBR			6th	30
1990	Lancia Delta Integrale 16v	(Italy) **Alex Fiorio**	MON	POR	KEN	FRA	GRC; 5	NZL	ARG	FIN; Ret	AUS	ITA; 8	CIV	GBR			9th*	25*
1990	Lancia Delta Integrale 16v	(France) **Didier Auriol**	MON	POR	KEN	FRA	GRC	NZL	ARG	FIN	AUS	ITA	CIV	GBR; 5			**2nd***	**95***
1990	Lancia Delta Integrale 16v	(Belgium) **Robert Droogmans**	MON	POR	KEN	FRA	GRC	NZL	ARG	FIN	AUS	ITA	CIV	GBR; 10			64th	1
1991	Lancia Delta Integrale 16v	(France) **Didier Auriol**	MON; Ret	SWE; 9	POR; 2	KEN	FRA; 2	GRC; 4	NZL; 3	ARG; 3	FIN; 2	AUS; Ret	ITA; 1	CIV	ESP	GBR; 12	**3rd**	**101**
1991	Lancia Delta Integrale 16v	(Italy) **Dario Cerrato**	MON	SWE	POR	KEN	FRA	GRC	NZL	ARG	FIN	AUS	ITA; 3	CIV	ESP	GBR	19th	12
1991	Lancia Delta Integrale 16v	(Italy) **Andrea Aghini**	MON	SWE	POR	KEN	FRA	GRC	NZL	ARG	FIN	AUS	ITA; 5	CIV	ESP; 5	GBR	14th	16
1991	Lancia Delta Integrale 16v	(Uruguay) **Gustavo Trelles**	MON	SWE	POR	KEN	FRA	GRC	NZL	ARG	FIN	AUS	ITA	CIV	ESP; Ret	GBR	49th*	3*
1993	Lancia Delta HF Integrale	(Spain) **Carlos Sainz**	MON; 14	SWE	POR; Ret	KEN	FRA; 4	GRC; 2	ARG; Ret	NZL; 4	FIN	AUS; Ret	ITA; DSQ	ESP; Ret	GBR		8th	35
1993	Lancia Delta HF Integrale	(Italy) **Andrea Aghini**	MON; Ret	SWE	POR; 3	KEN	FRA; Ret	GRC; 4	ARG	NZL	FIN	AUS	ITA; Ret	ESP	GBR		14th	22
1993	Lancia Delta HF Integrale	(Uruguay) **Gustavo Trelles**	MON	SWE	POR	KEN	FRA	GRC; 5	ARG; 4	NZL; 7	FIN	AUS	ITA	ESP; 6	GBR		9th	28
1993	Lancia Delta HF Integrale	(Italy) **Dario Cerrato**	MON	SWE	POR	KEN	FRA	GRC	ARG	NZL	FIN	AUS	ITA; Ret	ESP	GBR		-	0
1994	Ford Escort RS Cosworth	(Italy) **Gianfranco Cunico**	MON	POR	KEN	FRA	GRC	ARG	NZL	FIN	ITA; 6	GBR					25th	6
1994	Ford Escort RS Cosworth	(United Kingdom) **Malcolm Wilson**	MON	POR	KEN	FRA	GRC	ARG	NZL	FIN	ITA; 9	GBR					23rd	8
1996	Ford Escort RS Cosworth	(Italy) **Gianfranco Cunico**	SWE	KEN	IDN	GRC	ARG	FIN	AUS	ITA; 6	ESP						20th	6
1996	Mitsubishi Lancer Evo III	(Italy) **Piergiorgio Bedini**	SWE	KEN	IDN	GRC	ARG	FIN	AUS	ITA; Ret	ESP						-	0
1997	Ford Escort WRC	(Italy) **Gianfranco Cunico**	MON	SWE	KEN	POR	ESP	FRA	ARG	GRE	NZL	FIN	IDN	ITA; Ret	AUS	GBR	-	0
1998	Ford Escort WRC	(Italy) **Gianfranco Cunico**	MON	SWE	KEN	POR	ESP	FRA	ARG	GRE	NZL	FIN	ITA; Ret	AUS	GBR		-	0
1998	Ford Escort WRC	(Italy) **Angelo Medeghini**	MON	SWE	KEN	POR	ESP	FRA	ARG	GRE	NZL	FIN	ITA; Ret	AUS	GBR		-	0
1999	Ford Escort WRC	(Italy) **Andrea Navarra**	MON	SWE	KEN	POR	ESP	FRA	ARG	GRE	NZL	FIN	CHN	ITA; 10	AUS	GBR	-	0
