= Apollon (Formula One) =

Racing car constructor

- Full name: Apollon
- Founder(s): Loris Kessel
- Noted drivers: (Switzerland) Loris Kessel

Formula One World Championship career
- First entry: 1977 Italian Grand Prix
- Races entered: 1 (no starts)
- Engines: Cosworth
- Race victories: 0
- Points: 0
- Pole positions: 0
- Fastest laps: 0
- Final entry: 1977 Italian Grand Prix

Apollon was a Formula One racing car constructor from Switzerland. The team participated in one Formula One World Championship Grand Prix but failed to qualify. The team was formed by Loris Kessel, who also drove for the team.

== Formula One ==
After Loris Kessel had left John Macdonald's RAM team, he approached Frank Williams for a drive at his team. Williams had no place left for Kessel, but could sell him an old car, the FW03. Kessel agreed and approached Jolly Club, previously successful in touring cars and rallying. Kessel also hired ex-Ferrari designer Giacomo Caliri, updating the FW03 to become a car with a striking long nose and radiators placed directly in front of the front wheel suspension. The car was renamed the Apollon Fly, named after the sponsor of the project.

Due to transport issues, the Apollon team would not arrive to a Formula One paddock until the Italian Grand Prix late in the season.

At Monza the Apollon finally appeared. The outdated car was slow and was over 8 seconds off the pole time of James Hunt. The car would never race again and the Apollon team was disbanded soon after.

== Complete Formula One World Championship results ==
(key)

Year	Chassis	Engine	Tyres	Driver	No.	1	2	3	4	5	6	7	8	9	10	11	12	13	14	15	16	17	Points	WCC
1977	Apollon Fly	Ford Cosworth V8	G			ARG	BRA	RSA	USW	ESP	MON	BEL	SWE	FRA	GBR	GER	AUT	NED	ITA	USA	CAN	JPN	0	NC
1977	Apollon Fly	Ford Cosworth V8	G	(Switzerland) Loris Kessel	41							DNA		DNA			DNA	DNA	DNQ				0	NC
