= Loris Kessel =

Swiss racing driver (1950–2010)

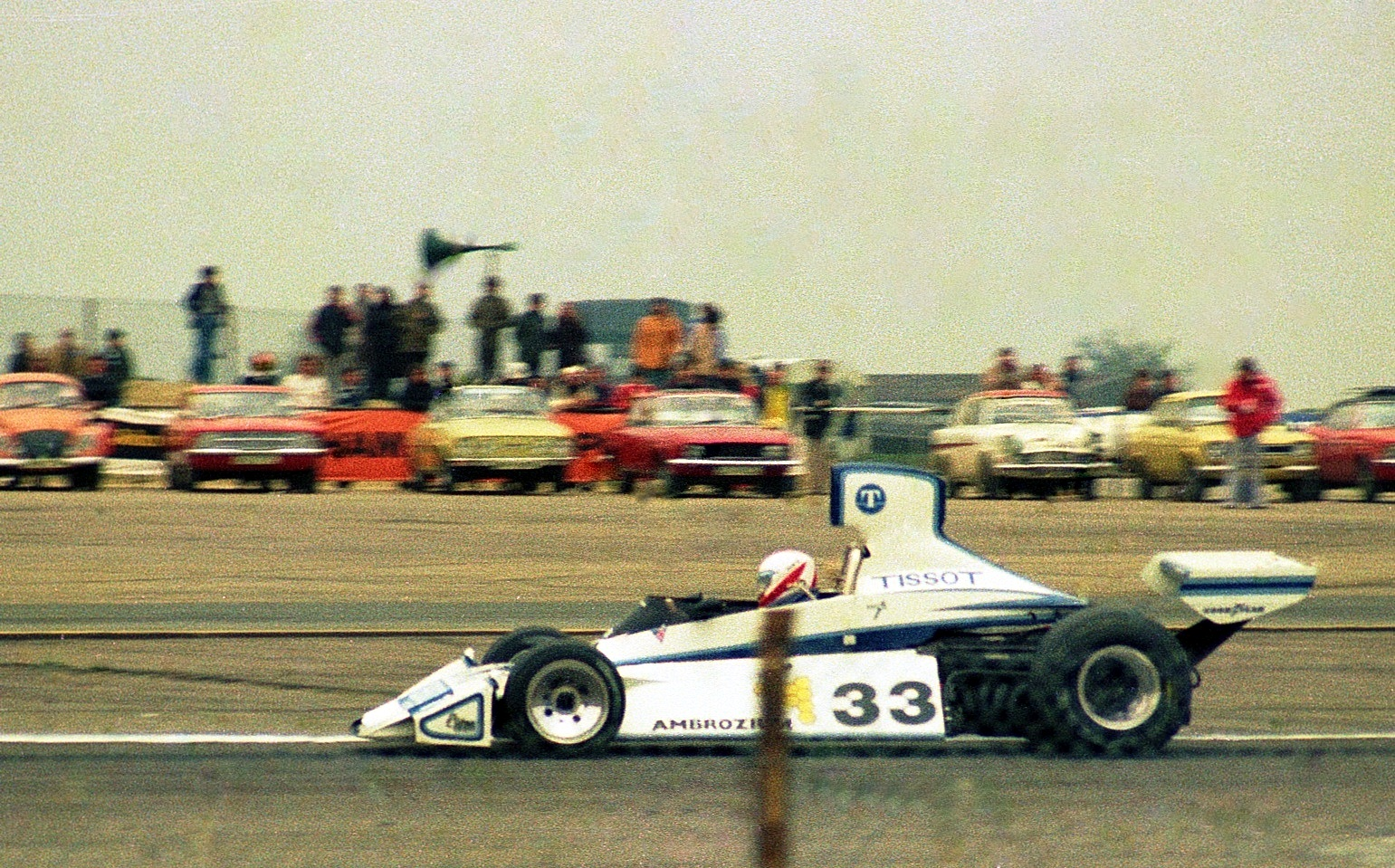
- Kessel in 1976
- Born: 1 April 1950; Lugano, Ticino, Switzerland
- Died: 15 May 2010 (aged 60); Montagnola, Ticino, Switzerland

Formula One World Championship career
- Nationality: (Switzerland) Swiss
- Active years: 1976–1977
- Team(s): Apollon; Non-works Brabham
- Entries: 6 (3 starts)
- Championships: 0
- Wins: 0
- Podiums: 0
- Career points: 0
- Pole positions: 0
- Fastest laps: 0
- First entry: 1976 Spanish Grand Prix
- Last entry: 1977 Italian Grand Prix

Loris Kessel (1 April 1950 – 15 May 2010) was a Swiss racing driver. Kessel won the 2004 Italian GT Championship in the N-GT class, together with Andrea Chiesa.

== Biography ==
Kessel was born in Lugano, Switzerland.

Following a couple of season in Formula Two, where he managed to finish fourth twice at Hockenheim driving for the March team, Kessel made his debut in Formula One.

Kessel participated in six Formula One World Championship Grands Prix, debuting on 2 May 1976, driving a Brabham for RAM. In 1977, he drove his own Apollon-Williams, but scored no championship points.

Following his retirement from competitive motorracing in 1981, Kessel established a series of car dealerships in Switzerland as well as his own racing team, competing in Ferrari Challenge series in Italy and the main European series. The team also competed in the Italian GT Championship, where it won the 2003 and 2004 titles, and the FIA GT3 European Championship with the same car.

In 2010, Kessel died in Montagnola, Switzerland, after a battle with leukemia. His son Ronnie continues to operate the Kessel cars dealership.

== Racing record ==
=== Complete European Formula Two Championship results ===
(key) (Races in bold indicate pole position; races in italics indicate fastest lap)

Year	Entrant	Chassis	Engine	1	2	3	4	5	6	7	8	9	10	11	12	13	14	Pos.	Pts
1974	Team Vonlanthen	March 742	BMW	BAR	HOC	PAU	SAL	HOC	MUG	KAR	PER	HOC	VLL; Ret					NC	0
1975	Ambrozium Racing Team	March 742	BMW	EST; Ret	THR; NC	HOC; 4	NÜR; Ret	PAU; 8	HOC; 4	SAL; DNQ	ROU							15th	7
1975	Ambrozium Racing Team	March 752	BMW									MUG; Ret	PER	SIL; NC	ZOL; Ret	NOG	VLL; 8	15th	7
1981	Horag Hotz Racing	March 812	BMW	SIL	HOC	THR	NÜR; 12	VLL	MUG; Ret									NC	0
1981	Astra Team Merzario Srl	Merzario M1	BMW							PAU; DNPQ								NC	0
1981	Horag Hotz Racing	March 802	BMW								PER; Ret	SPA						NC	0
1981	Astra Team Merzario Srl	March 812	BMW										DON; 19	MIS	MAN			NC	0

=== Complete Formula One World Championship results ===
(key)

Year	Entrant	Chassis	Engine	1	2	3	4	5	6	7	8	9	10	11	12	13	14	15	16	17	WDC	Pts
1976	RAM Racing	Brabham BT44B	Ford Cosworth DFV 3.0 V8	BRA	RSA	USW	ESP; DNQ	BEL; 12	MON	SWE; Ret	FRA; DNQ	GBR	GER	AUT; NC	NED	ITA	CAN	USA	JPN		NC	0
1977	Jolly Club of Switzerland	Apollon Fly	Ford Cosworth DFV 3.0 V8	ARG	BRA	RSA	USW	ESP	MON	BEL	SWE	FRA	GBR	GER	AUT	NED	ITA; DNQ	USA	CAN	JPN	NC	0

=== Complete 24 Hours of Le Mans results ===
Year	Team	Co-Drivers	Car	Class	Laps	Pos.	Class Pos.
1985	(Italy) Carma F.F. (Cheetah)	(Switzerland) Jean-Pierre Frey (Italy) Ruggero Melgrati (Italy) Aldo Bertuzzi	Alba AR2-Carma	C2	-	DNS	DNS
1993	(Germany) Obermaier Racing GmbH	(Germany) Otto Altenbach (Germany) Jürgen Oppermann	Porsche 962C	C2	355	7th	**3rd**
