= 1977 Formula One season =

31st season of the FIA's Formula One motor racing

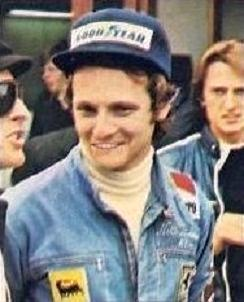
Niki Lauda (pictured in 1974) won his second World Championship with Ferrari.

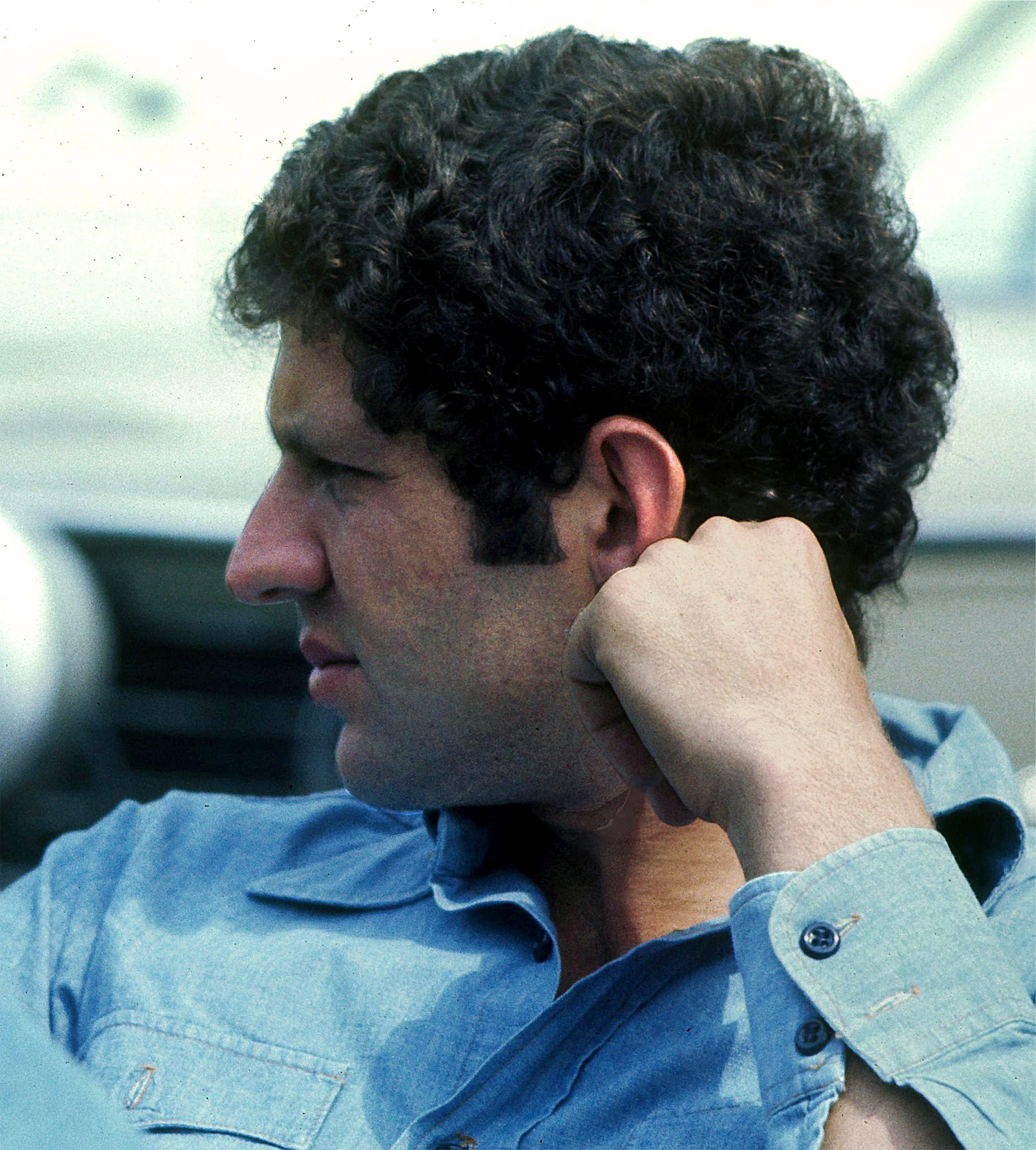
Jody Scheckter (pictured in 1976) placed second, driving for Wolf-Ford.

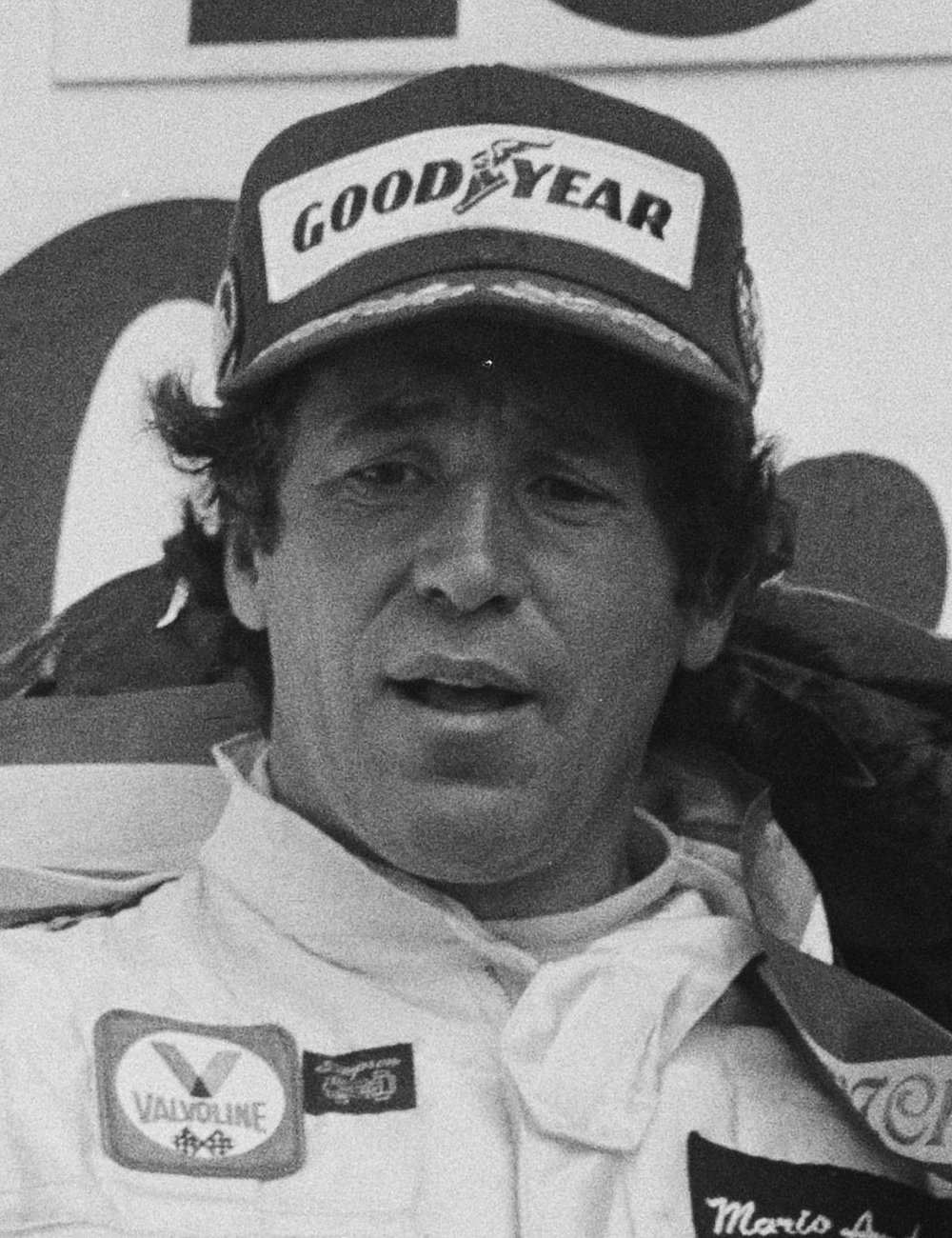
Mario Andretti (pictured in 1978) finished third, driving for Lotus-Ford.

The 1977 Formula One season was the 31st season of FIA Formula One motor racing. It featured the 28th World Championship of Drivers and the 20th International Cup for Formula 1 Constructors. The season commenced on 9 January 1977 and ended on 23 October after seventeen races, making it the longest Formula One season in the sport's history at the time (which was not matched until 1995). The season also included a single non-championship race for Formula One cars, the 1977 Race of Champions.

Niki Lauda won his second championship, despite Mario Andretti winning more races. Lauda did not complete the season, departing Scuderia Ferrari after securing the title at the 1977 United States Grand Prix. Ferrari won its third consecutive Constructors' title, with new driver Carlos Reutemann having a solid season.

The season was marred by a horrific accident during the South African GP: Tom Pryce was unable to avoid hitting 19-year-old race marshal Frederik Jansen van Vuuren, who had tried to cross the track. The latter was killed in the collision, while his fire extinguisher struck and killed Pryce. His car proceeded to the end of the straight where it collided with Jacques Laffite's Ligier. There was further tragedy as Carlos Pace lost his life in an aviation accident only a couple of weeks later.

At the 1977 Japanese Grand Prix, the last race of the season, Gilles Villeneuve's second race driving for Ferrari ended in tragedy as well when, on lap 6, after colliding with Ronnie Peterson's six-wheel Tyrrell P34, Villeneuve's car became airborne and collided with track marshal Kengo Yuasa, who was trying to have trespassing spectators move away from a restricted area of the track. Villeneuve's car also hit photographer Kazuhiro Ohashi. Villeneuve's Ferrari was completely destroyed and while he escaped uninjured, both Yuasa and Ohashi were killed instantly.

== Drivers and constructors ==
The following drivers and constructors contested the World Championship of Drivers and the International Cup for Formula 1 Constructors:

| Entrant | Constructor | Chassis | Engine | Tyres | No | Driver | Rounds |
|---|---|---|---|---|---|---|---|
| (United Kingdom) Marlboro Team McLaren | McLaren-Ford | M23E; M26 | Ford Cosworth DFV 3.0 V8 | G | 1 | (United Kingdom) James Hunt | All |
| (United Kingdom) Marlboro Team McLaren | McLaren-Ford | M23E; M26 | Ford Cosworth DFV 3.0 V8 | G | 2 | (West Germany) Jochen Mass | All |
| (United Kingdom) Marlboro Team McLaren | McLaren-Ford | M23E; M26 | Ford Cosworth DFV 3.0 V8 | G | 14 | (Italy) Bruno Giacomelli | 14 |
| (United Kingdom) Marlboro Team McLaren | McLaren-Ford | M23E; M26 | Ford Cosworth DFV 3.0 V8 | G | 40 | (Canada) Gilles Villeneuve | 10 |
| (United Kingdom) First National CIty Travelers Checks Elf Team Tyrrell | Tyrrell-Ford | P34 | Ford Cosworth DFV 3.0 V8 | G | 3 | (Sweden) Ronnie Peterson | All |
| (United Kingdom) First National CIty Travelers Checks Elf Team Tyrrell | Tyrrell-Ford | P34 | Ford Cosworth DFV 3.0 V8 | G | 4 | (France) Patrick Depailler | All |
| (United Kingdom) John Player Team Lotus | Lotus-Ford | 78 | Ford Cosworth DFV 3.0 V8 | G | 5 | (United States) Mario Andretti | All |
| (United Kingdom) John Player Team Lotus | Lotus-Ford | 78 | Ford Cosworth DFV 3.0 V8 | G | 6 | (Sweden) Gunnar Nilsson | All |
| (United Kingdom) Martini Racing | Brabham-Alfa Romeo | BT45; BT45B | Alfa Romeo 115-12 3.0 F12 | G | 7 | (United Kingdom) John Watson | All |
| (United Kingdom) Martini Racing | Brabham-Alfa Romeo | BT45; BT45B | Alfa Romeo 115-12 3.0 F12 | G | 8 | (Brazil) Carlos Pace | 1–3 |
| (United Kingdom) Martini Racing | Brabham-Alfa Romeo | BT45; BT45B | Alfa Romeo 115-12 3.0 F12 | G | 8 | (West Germany) Hans-Joachim Stuck | 4–17 |
| (United Kingdom) Martini Racing | Brabham-Alfa Romeo | BT45; BT45B | Alfa Romeo 115-12 3.0 F12 | G | 21 | (Italy) Giorgio Francia | 14 |
| (United Kingdom) Hollywood March Racing (United Kingdom) Rothmans International Racing (United Kingdom) Lexington Racing | March-Ford | 761B; 771 | Ford Cosworth DFV 3.0 V8 | G | 9 | (Brazil) Alex Ribeiro | All |
| (United Kingdom) Hollywood March Racing (United Kingdom) Rothmans International Racing (United Kingdom) Lexington Racing | March-Ford | 761B; 771 | Ford Cosworth DFV 3.0 V8 | G | 10 | (South Africa) Ian Scheckter | 1–2, 5–16 |
| (United Kingdom) Hollywood March Racing (United Kingdom) Rothmans International Racing (United Kingdom) Lexington Racing | March-Ford | 761B; 771 | Ford Cosworth DFV 3.0 V8 | G | 10 | (West Germany) Hans-Joachim Stuck | 3 |
| (United Kingdom) Hollywood March Racing (United Kingdom) Rothmans International Racing (United Kingdom) Lexington Racing | March-Ford | 761B; 771 | Ford Cosworth DFV 3.0 V8 | G | 10 | (United Kingdom) Brian Henton | 4 |
| (Italy) SEFAC Ferrari | Ferrari | 312T2B | Ferrari 015 3.0 F12 | G | 11 | (Austria) Niki Lauda | 1–15 |
| (Italy) SEFAC Ferrari | Ferrari | 312T2B | Ferrari 015 3.0 F12 | G | 11 | (Canada) Gilles Villeneuve | 17 |
| (Italy) SEFAC Ferrari | Ferrari | 312T2B | Ferrari 015 3.0 F12 | G | 12 | (Argentina) Carlos Reutemann | All |
| (Italy) SEFAC Ferrari | Ferrari | 312T2B | Ferrari 015 3.0 F12 | G | 21 | (Canada) Gilles Villeneuve | 16 |
| (United Kingdom) Rotary Watches Stanley-BRM (United Kingdom) Stanley-BRM | BRM | P207; P201B | BRM P202 3.0 V12; BRM P200 3.0 V12 | G | 14 | (Australia) Larry Perkins | 2–3 |
| (United Kingdom) Rotary Watches Stanley-BRM (United Kingdom) Stanley-BRM | BRM | P207; P201B | BRM P202 3.0 V12; BRM P200 3.0 V12 | G | 29 | (Belgium) Teddy Pilette | 13 |
| (United Kingdom) Rotary Watches Stanley-BRM (United Kingdom) Stanley-BRM | BRM | P207; P201B | BRM P202 3.0 V12; BRM P200 3.0 V12 | G | 35 | (Sweden) Conny Andersson | 5, 7–9 |
| (United Kingdom) Rotary Watches Stanley-BRM (United Kingdom) Stanley-BRM | BRM | P207; P201B | BRM P202 3.0 V12; BRM P200 3.0 V12 | G | 35 | (United Kingdom) Guy Edwards | 10 |
| (United Kingdom) Rotary Watches Stanley-BRM (United Kingdom) Stanley-BRM | BRM | P207; P201B | BRM P202 3.0 V12; BRM P200 3.0 V12 | G | 35 | (Belgium) Teddy Pilette | 14 |
| (United Kingdom) Rotary Watches Stanley-BRM (United Kingdom) Stanley-BRM | BRM | P207; P201B | BRM P202 3.0 V12; BRM P200 3.0 V12 | G | 40 | (Belgium) Teddy Pilette | 11 |
| (United States) Interscope Racing | Penske-Ford | PC4 | Ford Cosworth DFV 3.0 V8 | G | 14 | (United States) Danny Ongais | 15–16 |
| (France) Équipe Renault Elf | Renault | RS01 | Renault-Gordini EF1 1.5 V6t | M | 15 | (France) Jean-Pierre Jabouille | 10, 13–16 |
| (United Kingdom) Ambrosio Shadow Racing (United Kingdom) Ambrosio Tabatip Shadow Racing (United Kingdom) Ambrosio Villiger Shadow Racing | Shadow-Ford | DN5B; DN8 | Ford Cosworth DFV 3.0 V8 | G | 16 | (United Kingdom) Tom Pryce | 1–3 |
| (United Kingdom) Ambrosio Shadow Racing (United Kingdom) Ambrosio Tabatip Shadow Racing (United Kingdom) Ambrosio Villiger Shadow Racing | Shadow-Ford | DN5B; DN8 | Ford Cosworth DFV 3.0 V8 | G | 16 | (Italy) Renzo Zorzi | 4–5 |
| (United Kingdom) Ambrosio Shadow Racing (United Kingdom) Ambrosio Tabatip Shadow Racing (United Kingdom) Ambrosio Villiger Shadow Racing | Shadow-Ford | DN5B; DN8 | Ford Cosworth DFV 3.0 V8 | G | 16 | (Italy) Riccardo Patrese | 6–7, 9–11, 13–14, 16–17 |
| (United Kingdom) Ambrosio Shadow Racing (United Kingdom) Ambrosio Tabatip Shadow Racing (United Kingdom) Ambrosio Villiger Shadow Racing | Shadow-Ford | DN5B; DN8 | Ford Cosworth DFV 3.0 V8 | G | 16 | (United Kingdom) Jackie Oliver | 8 |
| (United Kingdom) Ambrosio Shadow Racing (United Kingdom) Ambrosio Tabatip Shadow Racing (United Kingdom) Ambrosio Villiger Shadow Racing | Shadow-Ford | DN5B; DN8 | Ford Cosworth DFV 3.0 V8 | G | 16 | (Italy) Arturo Merzario | 12 |
| (United Kingdom) Ambrosio Shadow Racing (United Kingdom) Ambrosio Tabatip Shadow Racing (United Kingdom) Ambrosio Villiger Shadow Racing | Shadow-Ford | DN5B; DN8 | Ford Cosworth DFV 3.0 V8 | G | 16 | (France) Jean-Pierre Jarier | 15 |
| (United Kingdom) Ambrosio Shadow Racing (United Kingdom) Ambrosio Tabatip Shadow Racing (United Kingdom) Ambrosio Villiger Shadow Racing | Shadow-Ford | DN5B; DN8 | Ford Cosworth DFV 3.0 V8 | G | 17 | (Italy) Renzo Zorzi | 1–3 |
| (United Kingdom) Ambrosio Shadow Racing (United Kingdom) Ambrosio Tabatip Shadow Racing (United Kingdom) Ambrosio Villiger Shadow Racing | Shadow-Ford | DN5B; DN8 | Ford Cosworth DFV 3.0 V8 | G | 17 | (Australia) Alan Jones | 4–17 |
| (United Kingdom) Durex Team Surtees (United Kingdom) Beta Team Surtees | Surtees-Ford | TS19 | Ford Cosworth DFV 3.0 V8 | G | 18 | (Austria) Hans Binder | 1–6, 15–17 |
| (United Kingdom) Durex Team Surtees (United Kingdom) Beta Team Surtees | Surtees-Ford | TS19 | Ford Cosworth DFV 3.0 V8 | G | 18 | (Australia) Larry Perkins | 7–9 |
| (United Kingdom) Durex Team Surtees (United Kingdom) Beta Team Surtees | Surtees-Ford | TS19 | Ford Cosworth DFV 3.0 V8 | G | 18 | (France) Patrick Tambay | 9 |
| (United Kingdom) Durex Team Surtees (United Kingdom) Beta Team Surtees | Surtees-Ford | TS19 | Ford Cosworth DFV 3.0 V8 | G | 18 | (Australia) Vern Schuppan | 10–13 |
| (United Kingdom) Durex Team Surtees (United Kingdom) Beta Team Surtees | Surtees-Ford | TS19 | Ford Cosworth DFV 3.0 V8 | G | 18 | (Italy) Lamberto Leoni | 14 |
| (United Kingdom) Durex Team Surtees (United Kingdom) Beta Team Surtees | Surtees-Ford | TS19 | Ford Cosworth DFV 3.0 V8 | G | 19 | (Italy) Vittorio Brambilla | All |
| (Canada) Walter Wolf Racing | Wolf-Ford | WR1; WR2; WR3 | Ford Cosworth DFV 3.0 V8 | G | 20 | (South Africa) Jody Scheckter | All |
| (United Kingdom) Team Tissot Ensign with Castrol; Theodore Racing Hong Kong | Ensign-Ford | N177 | Ford Cosworth DFV 3.0 V8 | G | 22 | (Switzerland) Clay Regazzoni | All |
| (United Kingdom) Team Tissot Ensign with Castrol; Theodore Racing Hong Kong | Ensign-Ford | N177 | Ford Cosworth DFV 3.0 V8 | G | 22 | (Belgium) Jacky Ickx | 6 |
| (United Kingdom) Team Tissot Ensign with Castrol; Theodore Racing Hong Kong | Ensign-Ford | N177 | Ford Cosworth DFV 3.0 V8 | G | 23 | (France) Patrick Tambay | 10–17 |
| (United Kingdom) Penthouse Rizla+. Racing (United Kingdom) Hesketh Racing | Hesketh-Ford | 308E | Ford Cosworth DFV 3.0 V8 | G | 24 | (United Kingdom) Rupert Keegan | 5–16 |
| (United Kingdom) Penthouse Rizla+. Racing (United Kingdom) Hesketh Racing | Hesketh-Ford | 308E | Ford Cosworth DFV 3.0 V8 | G | 25 | (Austria) Harald Ertl | 5–9 |
| (United Kingdom) Penthouse Rizla+. Racing (United Kingdom) Hesketh Racing | Hesketh-Ford | 308E | Ford Cosworth DFV 3.0 V8 | G | 25 | (Mexico) Héctor Rebaque | 11–13 |
| (United Kingdom) Penthouse Rizla+. Racing (United Kingdom) Hesketh Racing | Hesketh-Ford | 308E | Ford Cosworth DFV 3.0 V8 | G | 25 | (United Kingdom) Ian Ashley | 14–16 |
| (United Kingdom) Penthouse Rizla+. Racing (United Kingdom) Hesketh Racing | Hesketh-Ford | 308E | Ford Cosworth DFV 3.0 V8 | G | 39 | (Mexico) Héctor Rebaque | 7–9 |
| (United Kingdom) Penthouse Rizla+. Racing (United Kingdom) Hesketh Racing | Hesketh-Ford | 308E | Ford Cosworth DFV 3.0 V8 | G | 39 | (United Kingdom) Ian Ashley | 12–13 |
| (France) Ligier Gitanes | Ligier-Matra | JS7 | Matra MS76 3.0 V12 | G | 26 | (France) Jacques Laffite | All |
| (France) Ligier Gitanes | Ligier-Matra | JS7 | Matra MS76 3.0 V12 | G | 27 | (France) Jean-Pierre Jarier | 17 |
| (United Kingdom) Williams Grand Prix Engineering | March-Ford | 761 | Ford Cosworth DFV 3.0 V8 | G | 27 | (Belgium) Patrick Nève | 5, 7–16 |
| (Brazil) Fittipaldi Automotive | Fittipaldi-Ford | FD04; F5 | Ford Cosworth DFV 3.0 V8 | G | 28 | (Brazil) Emerson Fittipaldi | 1–16 |
| (Brazil) Fittipaldi Automotive | Fittipaldi-Ford | FD04; F5 | Ford Cosworth DFV 3.0 V8 | G | 29 | (Brazil) Ingo Hoffmann | 1–2 |
| (United States) Chesterfield Racing (United States) Liggett Group with BS Fabrications | March-Ford | 761 | Ford Cosworth DFV 3.0 V8 | G | 30 | (United States) Brett Lunger | 3–5 |
| (United States) Chesterfield Racing (United States) Liggett Group with BS Fabrications | McLaren-Ford | M23 | Ford Cosworth DFV 3.0 V8 | G | 30 | (United States) Brett Lunger | 7–16 |
| (United Kingdom) LEC Refrigeration Racing | LEC-Ford | CRP1 | Ford Cosworth DFV 3.0 V8 | G | 31 | (United Kingdom) David Purley | 5, 7–10 |
| (United Kingdom) F&S Properties Racing (United Kingdom) F&S Properties Racing with Marlboro (United Kingdom) RAM Racing | March-Ford | 761 | Ford Cosworth DFV 3.0 V8 | G | 32 | (Finland) Mikko Kozarowitzky | 8, 10 |
| (United Kingdom) F&S Properties Racing (United Kingdom) F&S Properties Racing with Marlboro (United Kingdom) RAM Racing | March-Ford | 761 | Ford Cosworth DFV 3.0 V8 | G | 32 | (Netherlands) Michael Bleekemolen | 13 |
| (United Kingdom) F&S Properties Racing (United Kingdom) F&S Properties Racing with Marlboro (United Kingdom) RAM Racing | March-Ford | 761 | Ford Cosworth DFV 3.0 V8 | G | 33 | (Netherlands) Boy Hayje | 3, 5–8, 13 |
| (United Kingdom) F&S Properties Racing (United Kingdom) F&S Properties Racing with Marlboro (United Kingdom) RAM Racing | March-Ford | 761 | Ford Cosworth DFV 3.0 V8 | G | 33 | (United Kingdom) Andy Sutcliffe | 10 |
| (West Germany) ATS Racing Team | Penske-Ford | PC4 | Ford Cosworth DFV 3.0 V8 | G | 33 | (Austria) Hans Binder | 12, 14 |
| (West Germany) ATS Racing Team | Penske-Ford | PC4 | Ford Cosworth DFV 3.0 V8 | G | 34 | (France) Jean-Pierre Jarier | 4–14 |
| (West Germany) ATS Racing Team | Penske-Ford | PC4 | Ford Cosworth DFV 3.0 V8 | G | 35 | (Austria) Hans Binder | 13 |
| (West Germany) ATS Racing Team | Penske-Ford | PC4 | Ford Cosworth DFV 3.0 V8 | G | 35 | (West Germany) Hans Heyer | 11 |
| (Spain) Iberia Airlines | McLaren-Ford | M23 | Ford Cosworth DFV 3.0 V8 | G | 36 | (Spain) Emilio de Villota | 5, 7–8, 10–12, 14 |
| (Italy) Team Merzario | March-Ford | 761B | Ford Cosworth DFV 3.0 V8 | G | 37 | (Italy) Arturo Merzario | 5–7, 9–11, 13 |
| (United Kingdom) British Formula One Team | March-Ford | 761 | Ford Cosworth DFV 3.0 V8 | G | 38 | (Belgium) Bernard de Dryver | 7 |
| (United Kingdom) British Formula One Team | March-Ford | 761 | Ford Cosworth DFV 3.0 V8 | G | 38 | (United Kingdom) Brian Henton | 5, 10, 12 |
| (Netherlands) HB Bewaking Alarmsystemen | Boro-Ford | 001 | Ford Cosworth DFV 3.0 V8 | G | 38 | (United Kingdom) Brian Henton | 13–14 |
| Jolly Club of Switzerland | Apollon-Ford | Fly | Ford Cosworth DFV 3.0 V8 | G | 41 | (Switzerland) Loris Kessel | 14 |
| (United Kingdom) Melchester Racing | Surtees-Ford | TS19 | Ford Cosworth DFV 3.0 V8 | G | 44 | (United Kingdom) Tony Trimmer | 10 |
| (Australia) Brian McGuire | McGuire-Ford | BM1 | Ford Cosworth DFV 3.0 V8 | G | 45 | (Australia) Brian McGuire | 10 |
| (Japan) Meiritsu Racing Team | Tyrrell-Ford | 007 | Ford Cosworth DFV 3.0 V8 | D | 50 | (Japan) Kunimitsu Takahashi | 17 |
| (Japan) Kojima Engineering | Kojima-Ford | KE009 | Ford Cosworth DFV 3.0 V8 | B | 51 | (Japan) Noritake Takahara | 17 |
| (Japan) Heros Racing Corporation | Kojima-Ford | KE009 | Ford Cosworth DFV 3.0 V8 | B | 52 | (Japan) Kazuyoshi Hoshino | 17 |

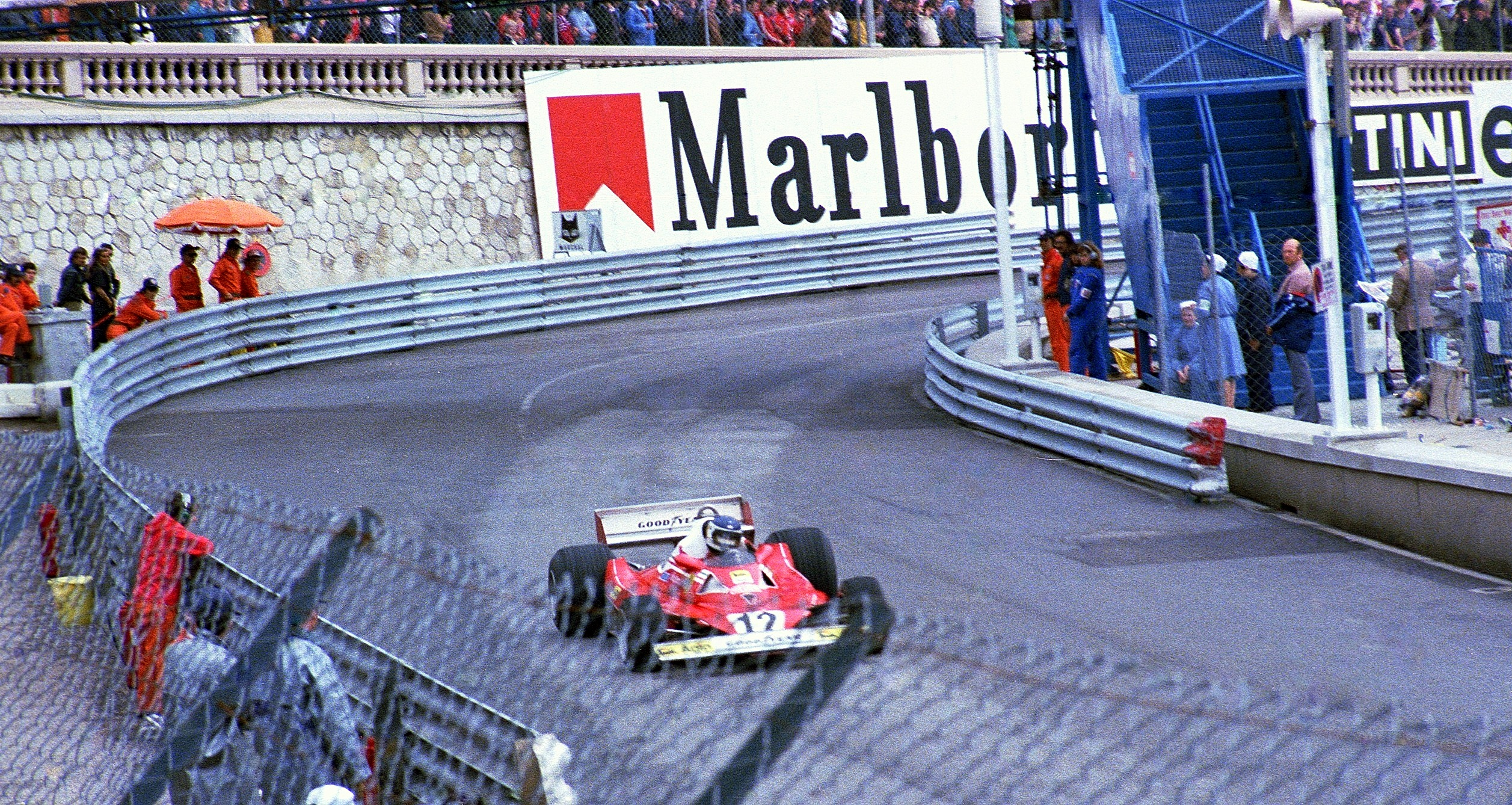
Carlos Reutemann during the 1977 Monaco Grand Prix

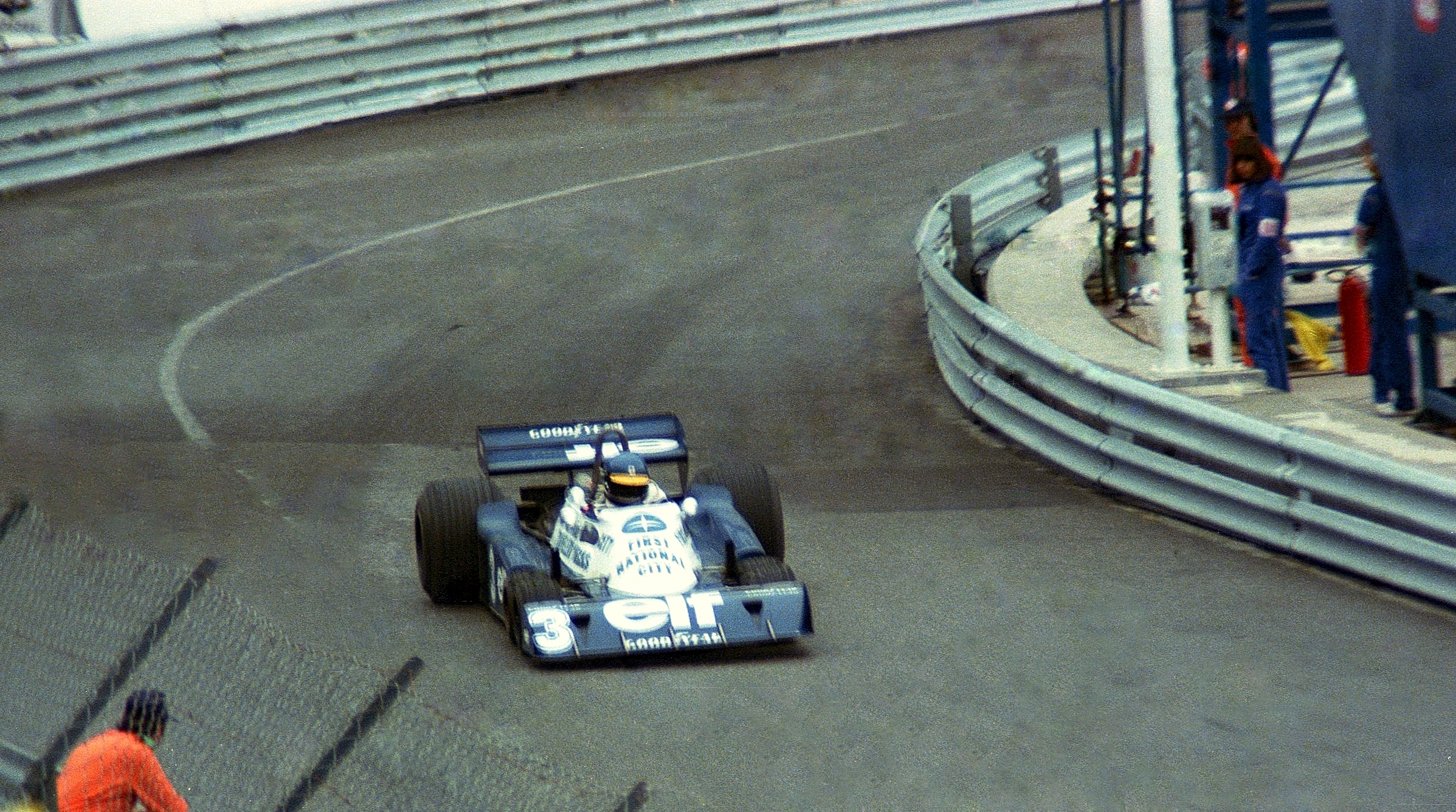
Ronnie Peterson driving the six-wheeled Tyrrell P34 in Monaco

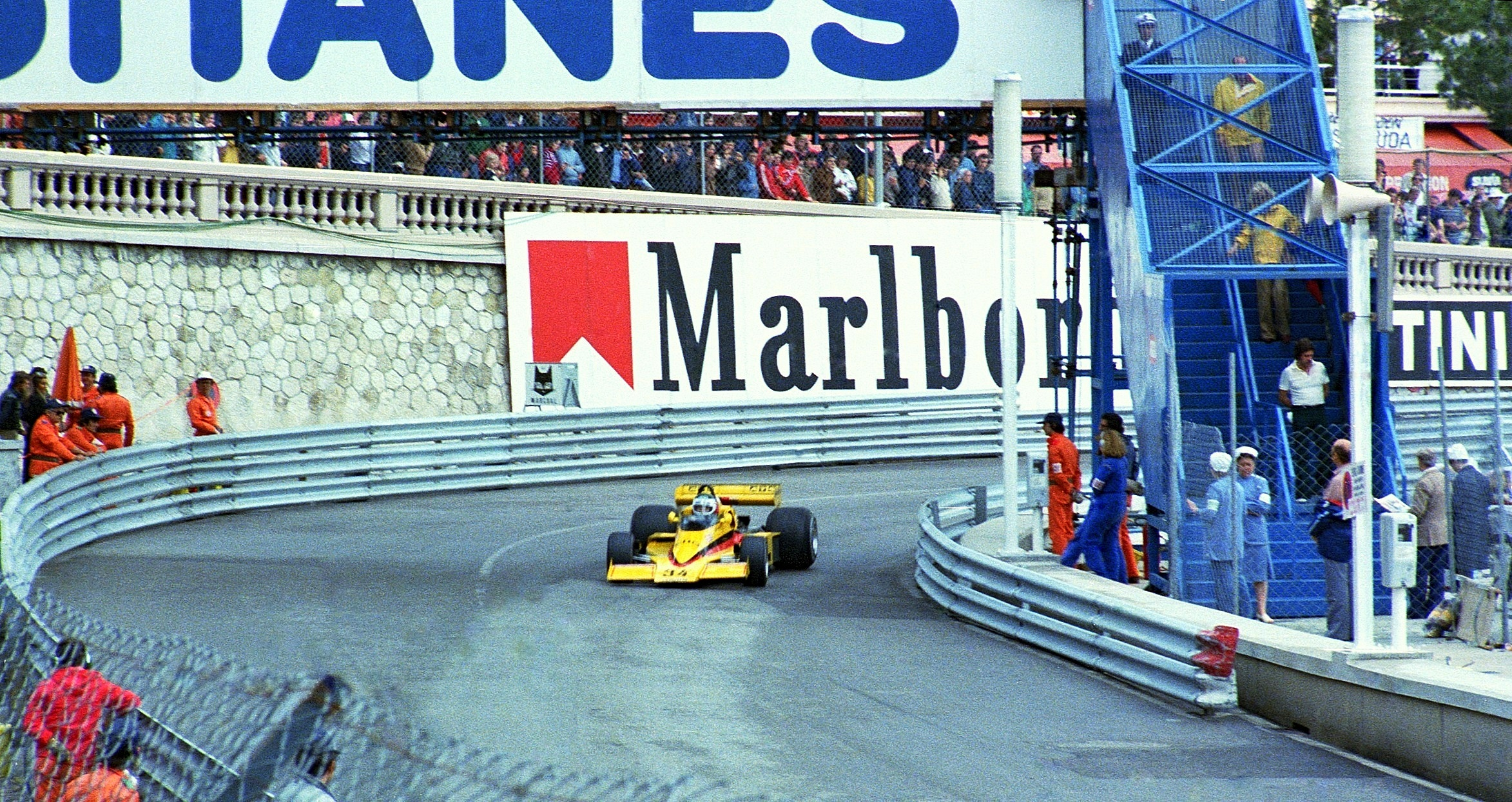
Jean-Pierre Jarier driving for ATS-run Penske PC4

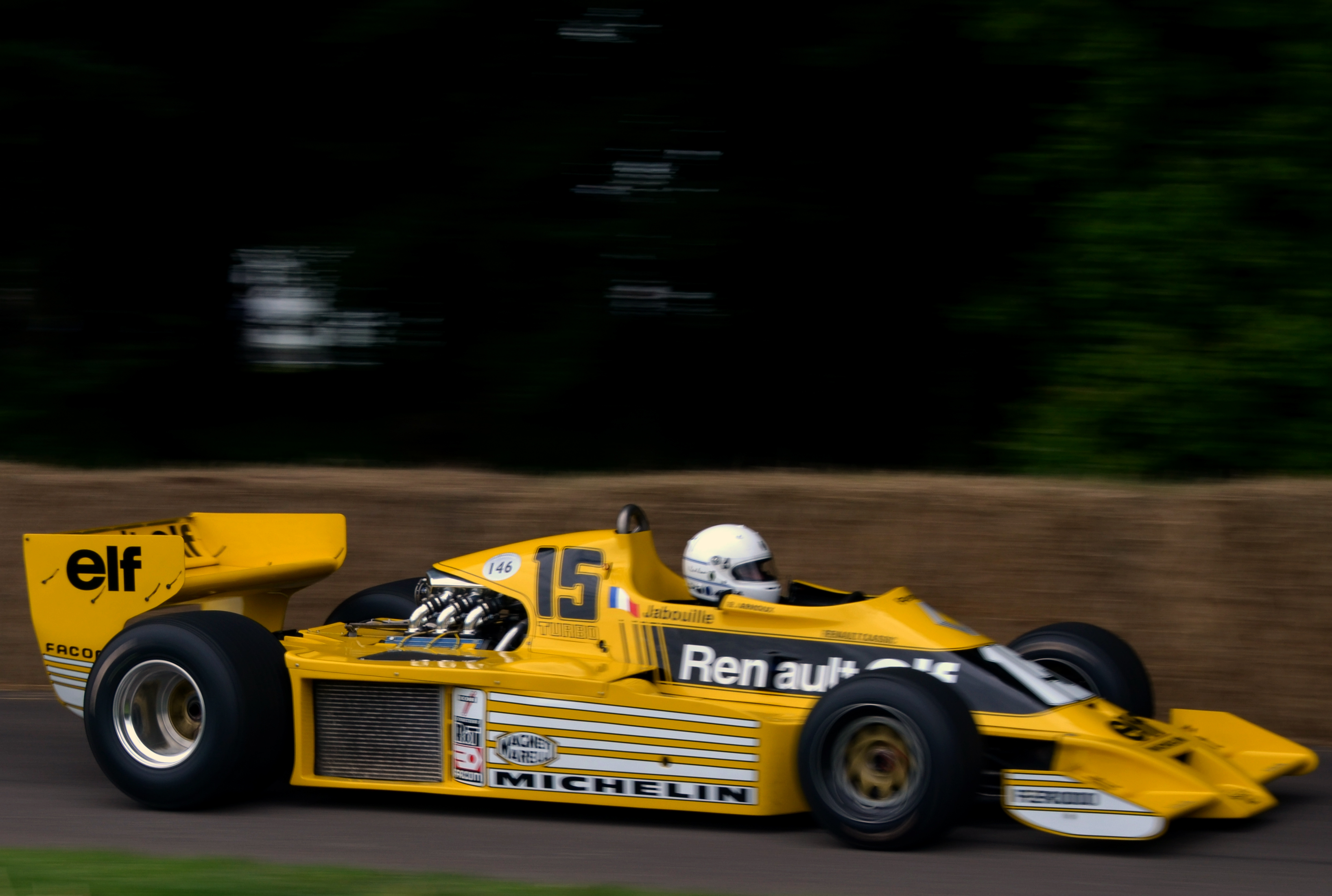
The first turbocharged F1 car, the Renault RS01 (pictured in 2012)

=== Team and driver changes ===
- Ferrari opted to sign Carlos Reutemann in the place of Clay Regazzoni, who moved to Ensign. Jacky Ickx had left Ensign after his crash at Watkins Glen. He only competed in Formula 1 sporadically after this.
- Tyrrell signed Ronnie Peterson instead of Jody Scheckter, who moved to Wolf. Wolf had separated with Williams after the 1976 season. The squad led by Frank Williams bought a March 761 and signed driver Patrick Nève.
- The Penske team was bought by ATS Wheels to form the ATS Racing Team, who signed Jean-Pierre Jarier from Shadow. Ex-Penske driver John Watson moved to Brabham and Shadow signed Renzo Zorzi.
- At March, Alex Ribeiro bought a seat with sponsorship from a Brazilian bank and a tobacco company, next to Ian Scheckter, older brother of Jody. Vittorio Brambilla had moved from March to Surtees.

==== Mid-season changes ====
- On 5 March, Tom Pryce was killed during the South African Grand Prix, as was marshal Frederik Jansen van Vuuren. And on 18 March, Carlos Pace was killed in a private light aircraft accident in Brazil. From the race at Long Beach on, Hans-Joachim Stuck replaced Pace at Brabham and Alan Jones replaced Pryce at Shadow.
- Hesketh Racing missed the first four races of the season, but expanded their operation to three cars. 1976 British F3 champion Rupert Keegan was their number-one driver.
- David Purley returned to Formula 1, after a one-off entry to the 1974 British Grand Prix, with a LEC chassis designed by Mike Pilbeam. He suffered a serious accident during practice at Silverstone when his throttle stuck open, hitting a wall head-on and enduring a 179.8g deceleration.
- After winning the 1977 Can-Am season with Haas Lola, Patrick Tambay debuted in Formula 1 with Surtees for one race and then finished the season with Ensign.
- Renault entered Formula 1 with their own chassis, powered by their factory-developed 1.5 litre turbocharged engine, and driven by Jean-Pierre Jabouille. Although compression devices like turbos had been allowed since 1960, they were the first constructor that made the investment into the technology on this level.
- After securing the Drivers' Championship with two races left on the calendar, Niki Lauda parted from his team and retired from the season. His place was taken by Gilles Villeneuve, in preparation for his full-season drive in 1978.

== Calendar ==
| Round | Grand Prix | Circuit | Date |
|---|---|---|---|
| 1 | Argentine Grand Prix | (Argentina) Autodromo de Buenos Aires, Buenos Aires | 9 January |
| 2 | Brazilian Grand Prix | (Brazil) Autodromo de Interlagos, São Paulo | 23 January |
| 3 | South African Grand Prix | (South Africa) Kyalami Grand Prix Circuit, Midrand | 5 March |
| 4 | United States Grand Prix West | (United States) Long Beach Street Circuit, California | 3 April |
| 5 | Spanish Grand Prix | (Spain) Circuito Permanente del Jarama, Madrid | 8 May |
| 6 | Monaco Grand Prix | Circuit de Monaco, Monte Carlo | 22 May |
| 7 | Belgian Grand Prix | (Belgium) Circuit Zolder, Heusden-Zolder | 5 June |
| 8 | Swedish Grand Prix | (Sweden) Scandinavian Raceway, Anderstorp | 19 June |
| 9 | French Grand Prix | (France) Dijon-Prenois, Prenois | 3 July |
| 10 | British Grand Prix | (United Kingdom) Silverstone Circuit, Silverstone | 16 July |
| 11 | German Grand Prix | (West Germany) Hockenheimring, Hockenheim | 31 July |
| 12 | Austrian Grand Prix | (Austria) Österreichring, Spielberg | 14 August |
| 13 | Dutch Grand Prix | (Netherlands) Circuit Park Zandvoort, Zandvoort | 28 August |
| 14 | Italian Grand Prix | (Italy) Autodromo Nazionale di Monza, Monza | 11 September |
| 15 | United States Grand Prix | (United States) Watkins Glen Grand Prix Course, New York | 2 October |
| 16 | Canadian Grand Prix | (Canada) Mosport Park, Bowmanville, Ontario | 9 October |
| 17 | Japanese Grand Prix | (Japan) Fuji Speedway, Oyama, Shizuoka | 23 October |

=== Calendar changes ===
- The Argentine Grand Prix returned to the calendar after it was cancelled in 1976 due to economic and political reasons.
- The Belgian Grand Prix and Monaco Grand Prix swapped places on the calendar so that the Belgian round followed the Monaco Grand Prix.
- The French Grand Prix was moved from Circuit Paul Ricard to Dijon-Prenois, in keeping with the event-sharing arrangement between the two circuits. Likewise, the British Grand Prix was moved from Brands Hatch to Silverstone.
- The German Grand Prix was not held at the Nürburgring due to safety concerns. The 1977 race was held at the Hockenheimring for the first time since 1970.
- The United States Grand Prix and Canadian Grand Prix swapped places on the calendar so that the Canadian round followed the US Grand Prix.

== Regulation changes ==
- For the first time, the FIA set safety standards for helmets.

== Season report ==
=== Race 1: Argentina ===
The 1977 season started in Argentina, returning after a year's absence. It was reigning world champion James Hunt who started off his title defence with pole position in his McLaren. Countryman John Watson shared the front row with him in the Brabham, and Patrick Depailler in the six-wheeled Tyrrell was third on the grid. The weather was, as was very often the case in Buenos Aires, oppressively hot, which contributed to the attrition of this race – the track temperature was 51 °C (124 °F).

Watson took the lead at the start with Hunt second. Watson led for the first 10 laps until Hunt moved ahead and pulled away, with Mario Andretti's Lotus third, but soon the other McLaren of Jochen Mass took the place. Mass had to retire soon after with an engine failure which caused him to spin, and a suspension failure took teammate and race leader Hunt out three laps later. Watson took the lead again, but he also had suspension failures and let teammate Carlos Pace through. Watson eventually retired, and Pace struggled towards the end due to heat in his cockpit and was passed by Jody Scheckter's Wolf and Andretti, but the latter retired then with a wheel bearing failure. Scheckter took the first win of 1977, with Pace second, and home hero Carlos Reutemann completing the podium for Ferrari.

=== Race 2: Brazil ===
The second round took place at the longest circuit of the year – the very demanding and difficult 5-mile Interlagos circuit in São Paulo, Brazil. Hunt took pole again with Reutemann second and Andretti third on the grid. Home hero Pace took the lead at the start, with Hunt dropping behind Reutemann as well but soon Hunt was back behind Pace and attacking. There was contact, and Hunt took the lead whereas Pace had to pit for repairs. Hunt led Reutemann until he began to suffer from tyre troubles and was passed by Reutemann. Hunt pitted for new tyres, and rejoined fourth and soon passed Niki Lauda in the Ferrari and Watson to reclaim second. Reutemann marched on to victory, Hunt was second and Lauda third after Watson crashed out.

=== Race 3: South Africa ===
The race in South Africa was over a month later, but Hunt still continued his streak of poles, with Pace alongside and Lauda next. Hunt led off at the start, with Lauda and Scheckter following him after Pace struggled. The order stayed put until the seventh lap when Lauda took the lead and was never headed again, with Scheckter taking second from Hunt 11 laps later.

On lap 21, two marshals ran across the track after the Shadow of Renzo Zorzi caught fire. The second marshal, Fredrik Jansen van Vuuren, carrying a fire extinguisher was hit by the car of Tom Pryce at about 270 km/h (170 mph) and was killed instantly by the collision. His fire extinguisher struck Pryce's face, killing and nearly decapitating him.

The race continued however, and Lauda won, his first since his own horror crash last year, with home hero Scheckter second, and Depailler's six-wheeler took third from Hunt in the closing laps.

=== Race 4: United States GP West ===
The death of Pryce had shaken the field up, and then before the next round at Long Beach, California in the western United States, there was more news, as Carlos Pace, who had finished second in the opening round in Argentina, was killed in a plane crash.

The field, in a somber mood, went to this relatively new street circuit near Los Angeles, and Lauda took pole ahead of home hero Andretti, with Scheckter third. At the start, it was Scheckter who got the best start, and he passed both Andretti and Lauda, with Reutemann going up an escape road and spinning as he tried to follow Scheckter through. The top three of Scheckter, Andretti and Lauda pulled away from the rest of the pack, and ran closely together but the order did not change. However, a tyre began to deflate for Scheckter, and both Andretti and Lauda passed him with two laps left, with Andretti thus taking a popular home victory ahead of Lauda and a disappointed Scheckter.

=== Race 5: Spain ===
The next round was in Spain, at the Jarama circuit near Madrid, where Andretti continued his recent form with pole and Jacques Laffite's Ligier springing a surprise, beating Lauda to second, however Lauda was unable to take part in the race due to a broken rib. At the start, Andretti took the lead with Laffite following. Laffite gave chase to Andretti in the early stages but had to pit with a deflating tyre, leaving Andretti to romp to victory with Reutemann second. Hunt inherited third but retired with a misfire, giving it to Watson until he lost places due to a spin, leaving Scheckter to take the final spot on the podium.

=== Race 6: Monaco ===
In the elite Monaco race, Watson took his first career pole for Brabham with Scheckter also on the front row and Reutemann third. It was Scheckter who got the best start to beat Watson to the first corner, with Reutemann running third in the early stages until he was passed by his teammate Lauda. Watson ran second to Scheckter until mid-race when he had to retire with gearbox trouble, allowing Lauda to close in on Scheckter but the latter was flawless and held on to take his second win of the season. Lauda had to be satisfied with second, with Reutemann completing the podium.

=== Race 7: Belgium ===
Belgium was host to the seventh race of the season, and in qualifying at the Zolder circuit Andretti took a comfortable pole with Watson just beating the second Lotus of Gunnar Nilsson to second. The race was wet due to rain earlier in the day, and Watson took the lead at the first corner, but later in the first lap, Andretti ran into the back to him while attempting to retake the lead, resulting in both of them spinning out and Scheckter taking the lead.

Scheckter led the early stages ahead of Nilsson, whereas Reutemann made an early charge but spun off. The track began to dry and everyone had to pit for tyres, and those who stopped early were the ones who benefited, as now Lauda was leading from Jochen Mass and Scheckter was down to fifth. Mass spun off from second, handing it to Nilsson who then went on to catch and pass Lauda before driving away to his first career victory. Behind second-placed Lauda, Ronnie Peterson completed the podium for Team Tyrrell after Scheckter retired with an engine failure.

=== Race 8: Sweden ===
The Swedish race at the isolated Anderstorp Raceway was full of anticipation after Nilsson's win last time out, but once again in qualifying, it was his teammate Andretti leading the way from Watson, with Hunt heading the second row. At the start, again it was Watson who led into the first corner followed by Scheckter, but soon Andretti passed both of them and opened up a lead. Watson and Scheckter battled for second until they collided, with Scheckter having to retire and Watson pitting for repairs. Hunt took second but he began to drop back and was passed by a charging Laffite, and then by his teammate Mass. Andretti however, was dominant until he had to pit due to a fuel metering problem with two laps left, handing the lead to Laffite who went on to take his first ever win ahead of Mass and Reutemann.

=== Race 9: France ===
The next race was staged at the newly extended Dijon-Prenois circuit in France, and once again it was Andretti on pole with Hunt second and Nilsson third on the grid. Hunt got the best start and led into the first corner from Watson and Laffite, with Andretti dropping down to fourth. However, Watson passed Hunt on the fifth lap and started to build a gap until Andretti got up to second and began to reel him in. During the final few laps, leader Watson and Andretti were running nose-to-tail but Watson held him off till the last lap when his engine missed a beat and immediately Andretti was past. Andretti thus took the win ahead of a crestfallen Watson and Hunt.

=== Race 10: Great Britain ===
British drivers had not much luck this season, so it was a relief to the British fans at the fast Silverstone circuit to see defending champion Hunt on pole for his home race with Watson alongside, and Lauda next. Hunt did not get a good start, and so Watson led into the first corner ahead of Lauda and Scheckter, but as the race progressed, a recovering Hunt soon passed both to get up to second behind Watson. The race was set for a grandstand British finish with Hunt slowly closing down leader Watson, but the fans were robbed of it when Watson's fuel system failed with 15 laps left and retired 8 laps later. Hunt took the lead and went on to win his first race of the season, with Lauda second. Scheckter ran third until his engine failed, thus giving the place to Andretti until he too suffered a similar fate, leaving Nilsson to take the final spot on the podium.

=== Race 11: West Germany ===
The West German race took place in Hockenheim because the Nürburgring track was deemed to be too dangerous to race on because of the inability of the 'Ring's organizers to effectively manage such a huge circuit. In qualifying, Scheckter took his first pole of the season, ahead of Watson and then Lauda who headed the second row. Scheckter kept the lead at the first corner with both Watson and Lauda keeping their positions. Watson put pressure on Scheckter until his engine failed on the eighth lap, giving second to Lauda who passed Scheckter soon after and began to pull away. Scheckter battled for second with Hunt until the defending champion retired with an engine failure, giving third to Watson's teammate and home driver Hans-Joachim Stuck. That was how it stayed to the end; Lauda winning from Scheckter and Stuck. One notable highlight of the race involved German touring car legend Hans Heyer, who started the race despite failing to qualify. Heyer ended up with the distinction of being the only F1 driver to fail to qualify, fail to finish, and be disqualified in the same race.

=== Race 12: Austria ===
With two-thirds of the season complete, Lauda led the championship as the drivers went to the very fast and scenic Österreichring in Austria. This circuit had been modified from the year before – a chicane had been put in to replace the ultra fast, flat out Voest-Hugel Kurve. Lauda pleased his home fans further by beating Hunt to pole, with Andretti settling for third on the grid. The race started in damp conditions, and poleman Lauda led into the first corner followed by Hunt, but Andretti passed both at one corner soon after. His teammate Nilsson was on a charge and was rapidly up to second, whereas Lauda went backwards.

Nilsson had to pit to change tyres, giving second to Hunt and this became the lead when Andretti's engine failed. The Australian Alan Jones in the Shadow was now charging up the order, passing both Scheckter and Stuck and as the race progressed, the recovering Nilsson and Lauda also passed the duo, however none of them could make an impression on Hunt. Hunt seemed to be headed for victory until his engine failed with ten laps left, giving Jones his first ever Formula One victory. Lauda took second and Stuck was third, both benefiting after Nilsson also retired with an engine failure. According to a misconception claimed by Alan Jones the song "Happy Birthday to You" was played for him as a winning driver during the podium ceremony instead of the national anthem of Australia. However, "Advance Australia Fair" was actually played, different from what Jones remembered. Yet "God Save the Queen" was the national anthem of Australia in 1977, being replaced by "Advance Australia Fair" in 1984, and "God Save the Queen" was really not played on the podium.

=== Race 13: Netherlands ===
The field went to the Zandvoort circuit near Amsterdam in the Netherlands for the next round, and in qualifying Andretti took his fifth pole of the season with Laffite alongside on the front row, and Hunt third. At the start, Hunt jumped both the front row starters to lead but before the end of the first lap, Andretti tried to drive alongside him but some aggressive defending from Hunt forced him to lift, and Laffite took advantage to get second. Five laps later, Andretti had got back past Laffite and was again attacking Hunt, who defended aggressively but this time Andretti did not lift and they collided. Hunt was out on the spot, whereas Andretti spun and rejoined fourth.

This left Laffite leading from the Ferraris of Lauda and Reutemann. The latter had a long battle with Andretti for third, repeatedly exchanging places, until the Lotus driver's engine blew up. Soon after, Lauda passed Laffite to take the lead, and he went on build a gap and win comfortably. Laffite finished second. After Andretti's demise, Reutemann ran third until the second Lotus of Nilsson attacked him, and the two collided with Nilsson out and Reutemann rejoining at the back. This sensationally left Patrick Tambay in the Ensign third, but he ran out of fuel on the last lap, thus handing the place to Scheckter.

This meant that Lauda had a 21-point lead over Scheckter with four races left.

=== Race 14: Italy ===
Italy was next on the calendar, but the fact that it was Ferrari's home race at the Monza Autodrome near Milan did not deter Hunt who took pole, whereas Reutemann cheered the home fans by starting second in front of Scheckter. Scheckter took the lead after a brilliant start, and in second place was Clay Regazzoni's Ensign who got an even better one. Regazzoni however did not have the pace and soon dropped down the order, whereas Andretti was on the move, passing Hunt on the second lap, and Scheckter a few laps later to take the lead. Hunt dropped back with brake troubles as the race progressed, and Scheckter retired when his engine failed, leaving Reutemann and Lauda in second and third. Lauda was soon past Reutemann, and the latter had to retire when he spun off on oil on the track, handing third to Jones. The race finished in that order; with Andretti taking a dominant victory from Lauda, who closed in on the championship, and Jones who took his second podium in three races.

=== Race 15: United States ===
The scenario going into the second race in the eastern United States at the picturesque and fast Watkins Glen circuit in upstate New York was that if Lauda had a single point or if Scheckter did not win the race, Lauda would be world champion. Scheckter's hopes looked bleak as he qualified ninth to Lauda's seventh, as Hunt took pole from the Brabhams of Stuck and Watson. Stuck got the best start and took the lead into the first corner followed by Hunt and Andretti. Scheckter was on a charge and passed many drivers, including Lauda, in the early stages to get up to fourth, which became third when leader Stuck crashed out. However, Hunt and Andretti continued to pull away from him and, with Lauda running fourth, Scheckter needed something extraordinary to happen to keep the title battle alive. That did not happen, as the rest of the race passed on without incident, with Hunt winning ahead of Andretti and Scheckter, with Lauda's fourth place enough to make him the world champion.

After the race, Lauda decided not to race in the final two races because of the declining relationship between him and Ferrari.

=== Race 16: Canada ===
Canada was host to the penultimate round of the season at the fast and flowing Mosport Park near Toronto, and the field went in minus Lauda, who was unconvinced that Ferrari could prepare three cars efficiently for a Grand Prix – the third car was for French-Canadian Gilles Villeneuve in his debut race with Ferrari. In qualifying, Andretti took yet another pole ahead of Hunt, with Ronnie Peterson's six-wheeled Tyrrell in third. The safety of the Mosport Park circuit was under intense scrutiny, as the ubiquitous bumps and limited safety of the circuit caused a number of nasty accidents including Briton Ian Ashley vaulting barriers and crashing into a TV tower. These accidents were dealt with badly and the severely injured Ashley was only flown out 40 minutes after he crashed. But the race went ahead anyway, and both Andretti and Hunt kept their positions at the start, with Hunt's teammate Jochen Mass charging up to third. Andretti and Hunt then proceeded to demolish the entire field, but they themselves were separated by nothing as they ran nose-to-tail. With less than 20 laps left, they came to lap third-placed Mass during which there was a misunderstanding between the McLarens who collided and spun off, Hunt retiring and Mass pitting for repairs and rejoining fifth. Andretti was left well over a lap ahead until his engine failed with three laps left, giving the win to Scheckter. Patrick Depailler finished second for Tyrrell, and Mass completed the podium.

=== Race 17: Japan ===
The final round of the season was in Japan at the fast Fuji Speedway near Tokyo, and Andretti and Hunt continued their late-season battle, with the American pipping Hunt to the pole, with Watson heading the second row. Unlike the previous year, the weather conditions at the Fuji circuit near Tokyo were perfect, and Hunt took the lead at the start, and Scheckter and Mass jumped up to second and third, whereas Andretti had a terrible start and was at the tail of the top ten. On the second lap, Andretti was involved in a collision while trying to gain places, putting him out. But this race, like South Africa was marred by terrible tragedy. Peterson and Villeneuve came together at the end of the straight, and Villeneuve crashed appallingly and his Ferrari flew into a crowd that was standing in a restricted area, killing two photographers and injuring several others. But the race continued on, and with Andretti out, Hunt had no challengers left and he built a large gap, with teammate Mass second and Watson passing Scheckter for third. However, both Mass and Watson had to retire within one lap of each other with engine and gearbox failures, and with Scheckter dropping back, Reutemann was second until he was passed by Laffite. Hunt went on and capped off the season with a comfortable win, whereas Laffite ran of fuel on the last lap, handing over second to Reutemann and allowing Depailler to complete the podium. The Japanese Grand Prix was not held again until 1987 at the Suzuka circuit – there had been talk of moving the race from Fuji to Suzuka for 1978, but this never materialized.

== Results and standings ==
=== Grands Prix ===
| Round | Grand Prix | Pole position | Fastest lap | Winning driver | Winning constructor | Report |
|---|---|---|---|---|---|---|
| 1 | (Argentina) Argentine Grand Prix | (United Kingdom) James Hunt | (United Kingdom) James Hunt | (South Africa) Jody Scheckter | (Canada) Wolf-Ford | Report |
| 2 | (Brazil) Brazilian Grand Prix | (United Kingdom) James Hunt | (United Kingdom) James Hunt | (Argentina) Carlos Reutemann | (Italy) Ferrari | Report |
| 3 | (South Africa) South African Grand Prix | (United Kingdom) James Hunt | (United Kingdom) John Watson | (Austria) Niki Lauda | (Italy) Ferrari | Report |
| 4 | United States Grand Prix West | (Austria) Niki Lauda | (Austria) Niki Lauda | (United States) Mario Andretti | (United Kingdom) Lotus-Ford | Report |
| 5 | (Spain) Spanish Grand Prix | (United States) Mario Andretti | (France) Jacques Laffite | (United States) Mario Andretti | (United Kingdom) Lotus-Ford | Report |
| 6 | Monaco Grand Prix | (United Kingdom) John Watson | (South Africa) Jody Scheckter | (South Africa) Jody Scheckter | (Canada) Wolf-Ford | Report |
| 7 | (Belgium) Belgian Grand Prix | (United States) Mario Andretti | (Sweden) Gunnar Nilsson | (Sweden) Gunnar Nilsson | (United Kingdom) Lotus-Ford | Report |
| 8 | (Sweden) Swedish Grand Prix | (United States) Mario Andretti | (United States) Mario Andretti | (France) Jacques Laffite | (France) Ligier-Matra | Report |
| 9 | (France) French Grand Prix | (United States) Mario Andretti | (United States) Mario Andretti | (United States) Mario Andretti | (United Kingdom) Lotus-Ford | Report |
| 10 | (United Kingdom) British Grand Prix | (United Kingdom) James Hunt | (United Kingdom) James Hunt | (United Kingdom) James Hunt | (United Kingdom) McLaren-Ford | Report |
| 11 | (West Germany) German Grand Prix | (South Africa) Jody Scheckter | (Austria) Niki Lauda | (Austria) Niki Lauda | (Italy) Ferrari | Report |
| 12 | (Austria) Austrian Grand Prix | (Austria) Niki Lauda | (United Kingdom) John Watson | (Australia) Alan Jones | (United Kingdom) Shadow-Ford | Report |
| 13 | (Netherlands) Dutch Grand Prix | (United States) Mario Andretti | (Austria) Niki Lauda | (Austria) Niki Lauda | (Italy) Ferrari | Report |
| 14 | (Italy) Italian Grand Prix | (United Kingdom) James Hunt | (United States) Mario Andretti | (United States) Mario Andretti | (United Kingdom) Lotus-Ford | Report |
| 15 | United States Grand Prix | (United Kingdom) James Hunt | (Sweden) Ronnie Peterson | (United Kingdom) James Hunt | (United Kingdom) McLaren-Ford | Report |
| 16 | (Canada) Canadian Grand Prix | (United States) Mario Andretti | (United States) Mario Andretti | (South Africa) Jody Scheckter | (Canada) Wolf-Ford | Report |
| 17 | (Japan) Japanese Grand Prix | (United States) Mario Andretti | (South Africa) Jody Scheckter | (United Kingdom) James Hunt | (United Kingdom) McLaren-Ford | Report |

=== Scoring system ===
Points were awarded to the top six classified finishers. The International Cup for F1 Constructors only counted the points of the highest-finishing driver for each race. For both the Championship and the Cup, the best eight results from rounds 1-9 and the best seven results from rounds 10-17 were counted.

Numbers without parentheses are championship points; numbers in parentheses are total points scored. Points were awarded in the following system:

| Position | 1st | 2nd | 3rd | 4th | 5th | 6th |
|---|---|---|---|---|---|---|
| Race | 9 | 6 | 4 | 3 | 2 | 1 |

=== World Drivers' Championship standings ===
| Pos | Driver | ARG (Argentina) | BRA (Brazil) | RSA (South Africa) | USW (United States) | ESP (Spain) | MON (Monaco) | BEL (Belgium) | SWE (Sweden) | FRA (France) | GBR (United Kingdom) | GER (West Germany) | AUT (Austria) | NED (Netherlands) | ITA (Italy) | USA (United States) | CAN (Canada) | JPN (Japan) | Pts |
|---|---|---|---|---|---|---|---|---|---|---|---|---|---|---|---|---|---|---|---|
| 1 | (Austria) Niki Lauda | Ret | 3 | 1 | 2^{P}^{F} | DNS | 2 | 2 | Ret | 5 | 2 | 1^{F} | 2^{P} | 1^{F} | 2 | 4 | | | 72 |
| 2 | (South Africa) Jody Scheckter | 1 | Ret | 2 | 3 | 3 | 1^{F} | Ret | Ret | Ret | Ret | 2^{P} | Ret | 3 | Ret | 3 | 1 | 10^{F} | 55 |
| 3 | (United States) Mario Andretti | 5 | Ret | Ret | 1 | 1^{P} | 5 | Ret^{P} | 6^{P}^{F} | 1^{P}^{F} | 14 | Ret | Ret | Ret^{P} | 1^{F} | 2 | 9^{P}^{F} | Ret^{P} | 47 |
| 4 | (Argentina) Carlos Reutemann | 3 | 1 | 8 | Ret | 2 | 3 | Ret | 3 | 6 | 15 | 4 | 4 | 6 | Ret | 6 | Ret | 2 | 42 |
| 5 | (United Kingdom) James Hunt | Ret^{P}^{F} | 2^{P}^{F} | 4^{P} | 7 | Ret | Ret | 7 | 12 | 3 | 1^{P}^{F} | Ret | Ret | Ret | Ret^{P} | 1^{P} | Ret | 1 | 40 |
| 6 | (West Germany) Jochen Mass | Ret | Ret | 5 | Ret | 4 | 4 | Ret | 2 | 9 | 4 | Ret | 6 | Ret | 4 | Ret | 3 | Ret | 25 |
| 7 | (Australia) Alan Jones | | | | Ret | Ret | 6 | 5 | 17 | Ret | 7 | Ret | 1 | Ret | 3 | Ret | 4 | 4 | 22 |
| 8 | (Sweden) Gunnar Nilsson | DNS | 5 | 12 | 8 | 5 | Ret | 1^{F} | 19 | 4 | 3 | Ret | Ret | Ret | Ret | Ret | Ret | Ret | 20 |
| = | (France) Patrick Depailler | Ret | Ret | 3 | 4 | Ret | Ret | 8 | 4 | Ret | Ret | Ret | 13 | Ret | Ret | 14 | 2 | 3 | 20 |
| 10 | (France) Jacques Laffite | NC | Ret | Ret | 9 | 7^{F} | 7 | Ret | 1 | 8 | 6 | Ret | Ret | 2 | 8 | 7 | Ret | 5 | 18 |
| 11 | (West Germany) Hans-Joachim Stuck | | | Ret | Ret | 6 | Ret | 6 | 10 | Ret | 5 | 3 | 3 | 7 | Ret | Ret | Ret | 7 | 12 |
| 12 | (Brazil) Emerson Fittipaldi | 4 | 4 | 10 | 5 | 14 | Ret | Ret | 18 | 11 | Ret | DNQ | 11 | 4 | DNQ | 13 | Ret | | 11 |
| 13 | (United Kingdom) John Watson | Ret | Ret | 6^{F} | DSQ | Ret | Ret^{P} | Ret | 5 | 2 | Ret | Ret | 8^{F} | Ret | Ret | 12 | Ret | Ret | 9 |
| 14 | (Sweden) Ronnie Peterson | Ret | Ret | Ret | Ret | 8 | Ret | 3 | Ret | 12 | Ret | 9 | 5 | Ret | 6 | 16^{F} | Ret | Ret | 7 |
| 15 | (Brazil) Carlos Pace | 2 | Ret | 13 | | | | | | | | | | | | | | | 6 |
| = | (Italy) Vittorio Brambilla | 7 | Ret | 7 | Ret | Ret | 8 | 4 | Ret | 13 | 8 | 5 | 15 | 12 | Ret | 19 | 6 | 8 | 6 |
| 17 | (Switzerland) Clay Regazzoni | 6 | Ret | 9 | Ret | Ret | DNQ | Ret | 7 | 7 | DNQ | Ret | Ret | Ret | 5 | 5 | Ret | Ret | 5 |
| = | (France) Patrick Tambay | | | | | | | | | DNQ | Ret | 6 | Ret | 5 | Ret | DNQ | 5 | Ret | 5 |
| 19 | (France) Jean-Pierre Jarier | | | | 6 | DNQ | 11 | 11 | 8 | Ret | 9 | Ret | 14 | Ret | Ret | 9 | | Ret | 1 |
| = | (Italy) Riccardo Patrese | | | | | | 9 | Ret | | Ret | Ret | 10 | | 13 | Ret | | 10 | 6 | 1 |
| = | (Italy) Renzo Zorzi | Ret | 6 | Ret | Ret | Ret | | | | | | | | | | | | | 1 |
| — | (United Kingdom) Rupert Keegan | | | | | Ret | 12 | Ret | 13 | 10 | Ret | Ret | 7 | Ret | 9 | 8 | Ret | | 0 |
| — | (Belgium) Patrick Nève | | | | | 12 | | 10 | 15 | DNQ | 10 | DNQ | 9 | DNQ | 7 | 18 | Ret | | 0 |
| — | (Australia) Vern Schuppan | | | | | | | | | | 12 | 7 | 16 | DNQ | | | | | 0 |
| — | (Brazil) Ingo Hoffmann | Ret | 7 | | | | | | | | | | | | | | | | 0 |
| — | (United States) Danny Ongais | | | | | | | | | | | | | | | Ret | 7 | | 0 |
| — | (Brazil) Alex Ribeiro | Ret | Ret | Ret | Ret | DNQ | DNQ | DNQ | DNQ | DNQ | DNQ | 8 | DNQ | 11 | DNQ | 15 | 8 | 12 | 0 |
| — | (Austria) Hans Binder | Ret | Ret | 11 | 11 | 9 | Ret | | | | | | 12 | 8 | DNQ | 11 | Ret | Ret | 0 |
| — | (United States) Brett Lunger | | | 14 | Ret | 10 | | DNS | 11 | DNQ | 13 | Ret | 10 | 9 | Ret | 10 | 11 | | 0 |
| — | (Austria) Harald Ertl | | | | | Ret | DNQ | 9 | 16 | DNQ | | | | | | | | | 0 |
| — | (United Kingdom) Jackie Oliver | | | | | | | | 9 | | | | | | | | | | 0 |
| — | (Japan) Kunimitsu Takahashi | | | | | | | | | | | | | | | | | 9 | 0 |
| — | (South Africa) Ian Scheckter | Ret | Ret | | | 11 | DNQ | Ret | Ret | NC | Ret | Ret | Ret | 10 | Ret | Ret | Ret | | 0 |
| — | (United Kingdom) Brian Henton | | | | 10 | DNQ | | | | | DNQ | | DNQ | DSQ | DNQ | | | | 0 |
| — | (Belgium) Jacky Ickx | | | | | | 10 | | | | | | | | | | | | 0 |
| — | (Canada) Gilles Villeneuve | | | | | | | | | | 11 | | | | | | 12 | Ret | 0 |
| — | (Japan) Kazuyoshi Hoshino | | | | | | | | | | | | | | | | | 11 | 0 |
| — | (Australia) Larry Perkins | | Ret | 15 | | | | 12 | DNQ | DNQ | | | | | | | | | 0 |
| — | (United Kingdom) David Purley | | | | | DNQ | | 13 | 14 | Ret | DNPQ | | | | | | | | 0 |
| — | (Spain) Emilio de Villota | | | | | 13 | | DNQ | DNQ | | DNQ | DNQ | 17 | | DNQ | | | | 0 |
| — | (Italy) Arturo Merzario | | | | | Ret | DNQ | 14 | | Ret | Ret | DNQ | Ret | DNQ | | | | | 0 |
| — | (United Kingdom) Ian Ashley | | | | | | | | | | | | DNQ | DNQ | DNQ | 17 | DNS | | 0 |
| — | (United Kingdom) Tom Pryce | NC | Ret | Ret | | | | | | | | | | | | | | | 0 |
| — | (Netherlands) Boy Hayje | | | Ret | | DNQ | DNQ | NC | DNQ | | | | | DNQ | | | | | 0 |
| — | (France) Jean-Pierre Jabouille | | | | | | | | | | Ret | | | Ret | Ret | Ret | DNQ | | 0 |
| — | (Mexico) Héctor Rebaque | | | | | | | DNQ | DNQ | DNQ | | Ret | DNQ | DNQ | | | | | 0 |
| — | (West Germany) Hans Heyer | | | | | | | | | | | DSQ | | | | | | | 0 |
| — | (Italy) Bruno Giacomelli | | | | | | | | | | | | | | Ret | | | | 0 |
| — | (Japan) Noritake Takahara | | | | | | | | | | | | | | | | | Ret | 0 |
| — | (Sweden) Conny Andersson | | | | | DNQ | | DNQ | DNQ | DNQ | | | | | | | | | 0 |
| — | (Belgium) Teddy Pilette | | | | | | | | | | | DNQ | | DNQ | DNQ | | | | 0 |
| — | (Finland) Mikko Kozarowitzky | | | | | | | | DNQ | | DNPQ | | | | | | | | 0 |
| — | (Belgium) Bernard de Dryver | | | | | | | DNQ | | | | | | | | | | | 0 |
| — | (Netherlands) Michael Bleekemolen | | | | | | | | | | | | | DNQ | | | | | 0 |
| — | (Italy) Lamberto Leoni | | | | | | | | | | | | | | DNQ | | | | 0 |
| — | (Switzerland) Loris Kessel | | | | | | | | | | | | | | DNQ | | | | 0 |
| — | (Italy) Giorgio Francia | | | | | | | | | | | | | | DNQ | | | | 0 |
| — | (United Kingdom) Tony Trimmer | | | | | | | | | | DNPQ | | | | | | | | 0 |
| — | (United Kingdom) Andy Sutcliffe | | | | | | | | | | DNPQ | | | | | | | | 0 |
| — | (United Kingdom) Guy Edwards | | | | | | | | | | DNPQ | | | | | | | | 0 |
| — | (Australia) Brian McGuire | | | | | | | | | | DNPQ | | | | | | | | 0 |
| Pos | Driver | ARG (Argentina) | BRA (Brazil) | RSA (South Africa) | USW (United States) | ESP (Spain) | MON (Monaco) | BEL (Belgium) | SWE (Sweden) | FRA (France) | GBR (United Kingdom) | GER (West Germany) | AUT (Austria) | NED (Netherlands) | ITA (Italy) | USA (United States) | CAN (Canada) | JPN (Japan) | Pts |

Key
| Colour | Result |
|---|---|
| Gold | Winner |
| Silver | Second place |
| Bronze | Third place |
| Green | Other points position |
| Blue | Other classified position |
| Blue | Not classified, finished (NC) |
| Purple | Not classified, retired (Ret) |
| Red | Did not qualify (DNQ) |
| Black | Disqualified (DSQ) |
| White | Did not start (DNS) |
| White | Race cancelled (C) |
| Blank | Did not practice (DNP) |
| Blank | Excluded (EX) |
| Blank | Did not arrive (DNA) |
| Blank | Withdrawn (WD) |
| Blank | Did not enter (empty cell) |
| Annotation | Meaning |
| P | Pole position |
| F | Fastest lap |

=== International Cup for F1 Constructors standings ===
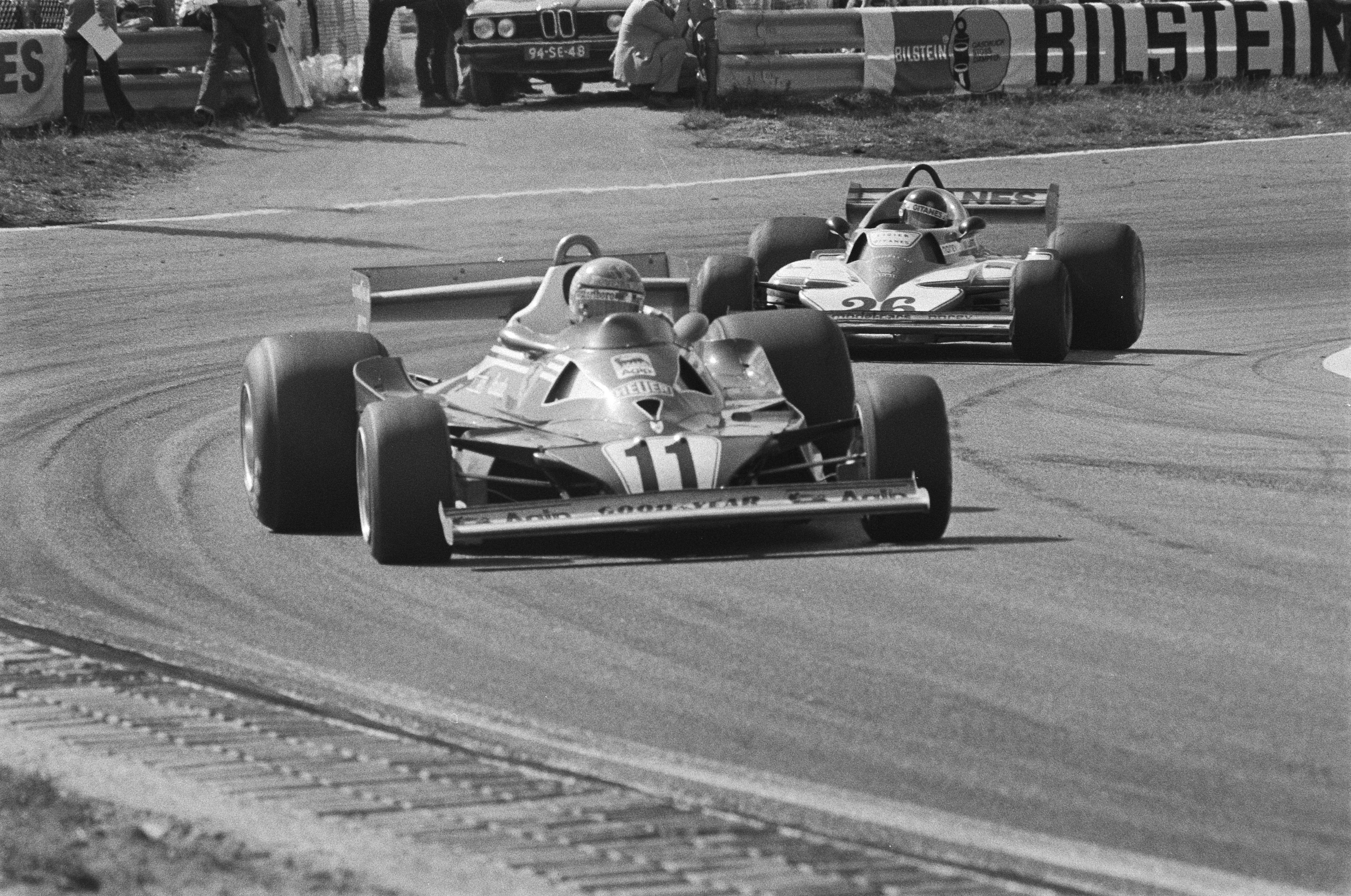
Ferrari won the Constructors title with its 312T2 model

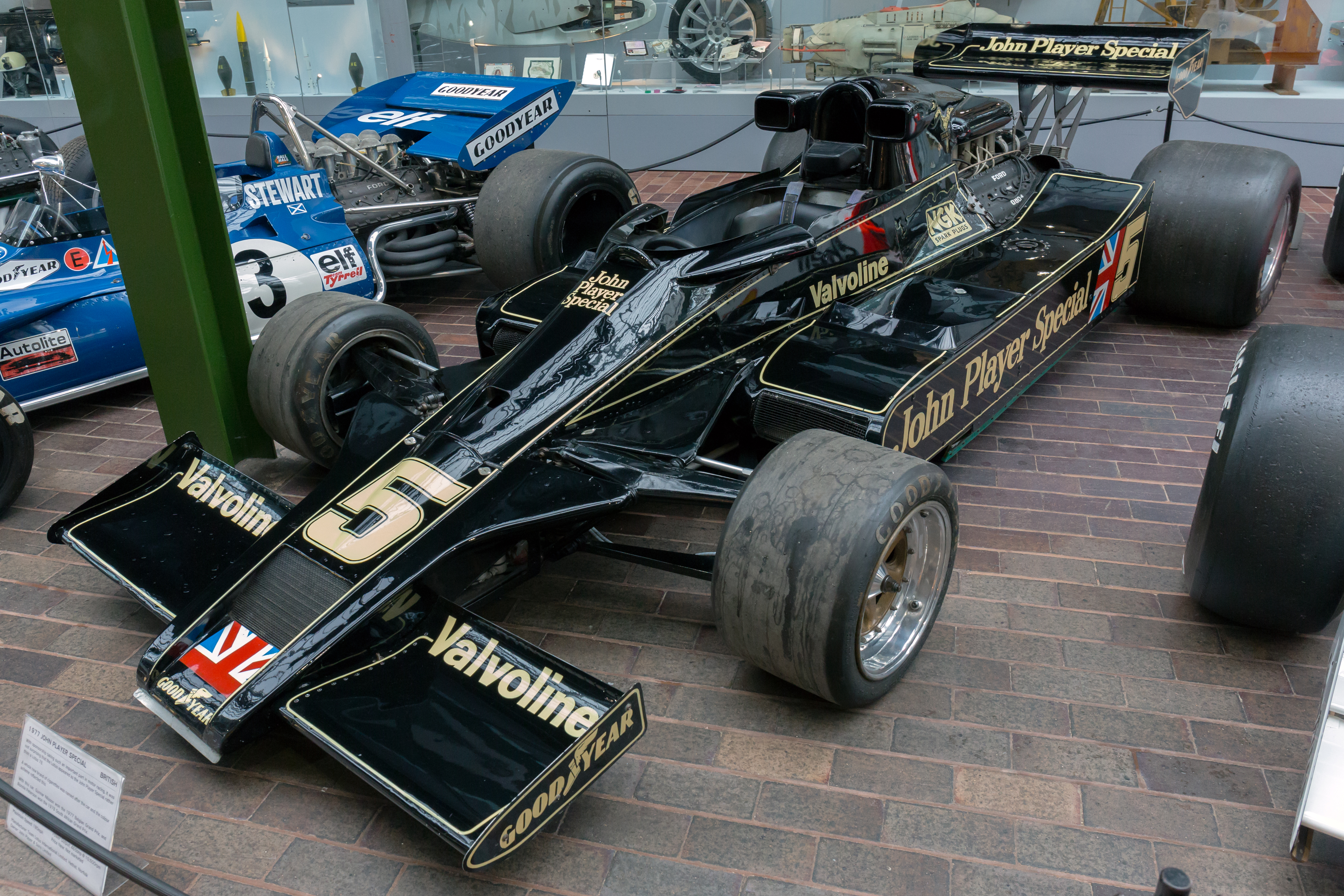
Lotus placed second with the Lotus 78

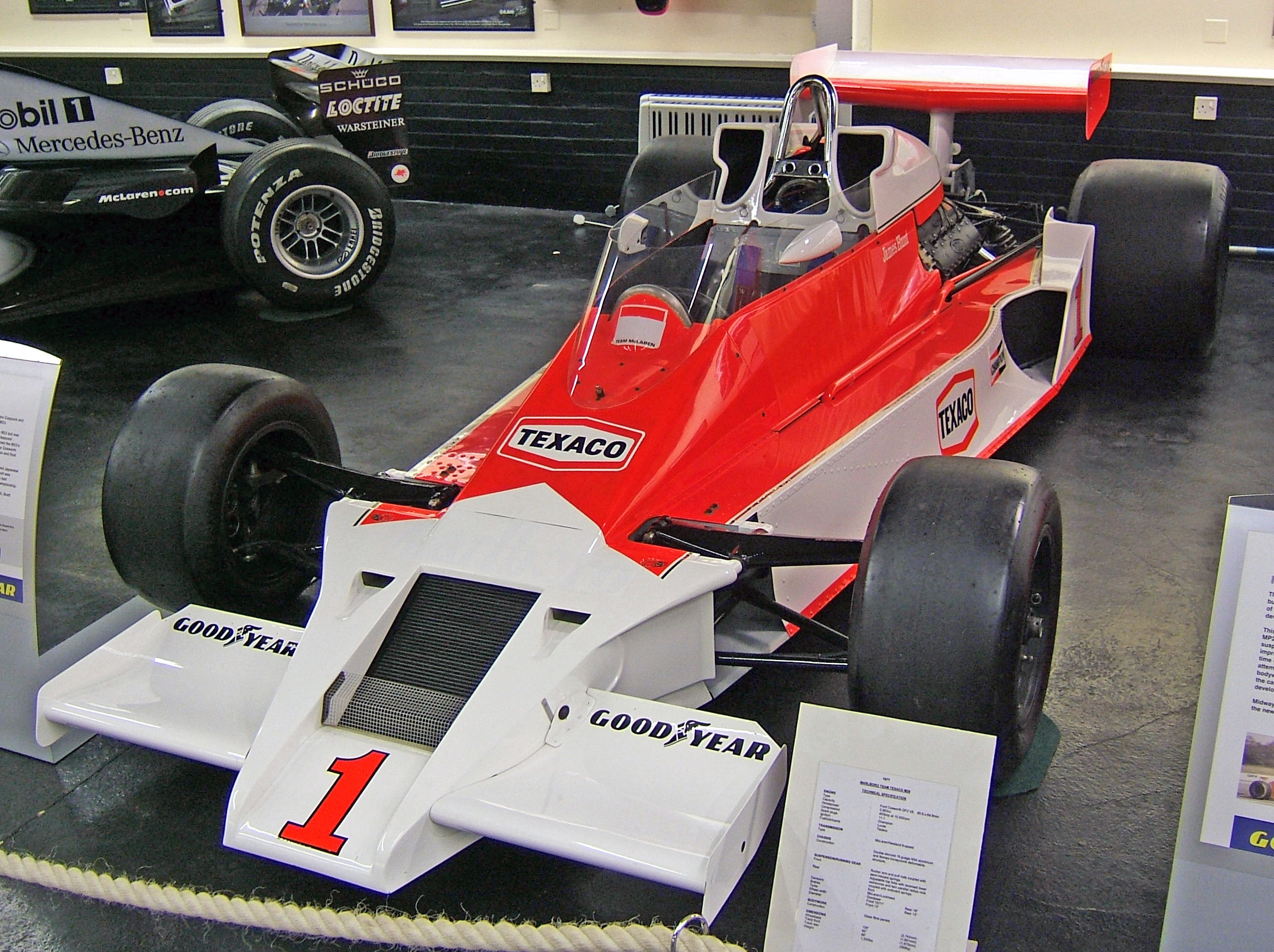
McLaren placed third with the M23 and M26 (pictured)

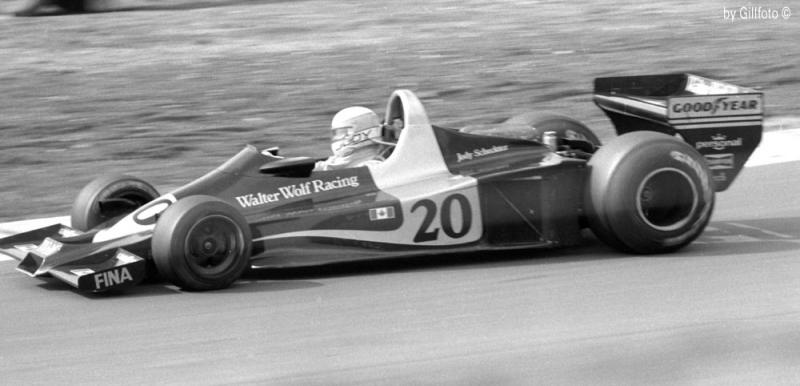
Wolf placed fourth with its WR1, WR2 and WR3 models

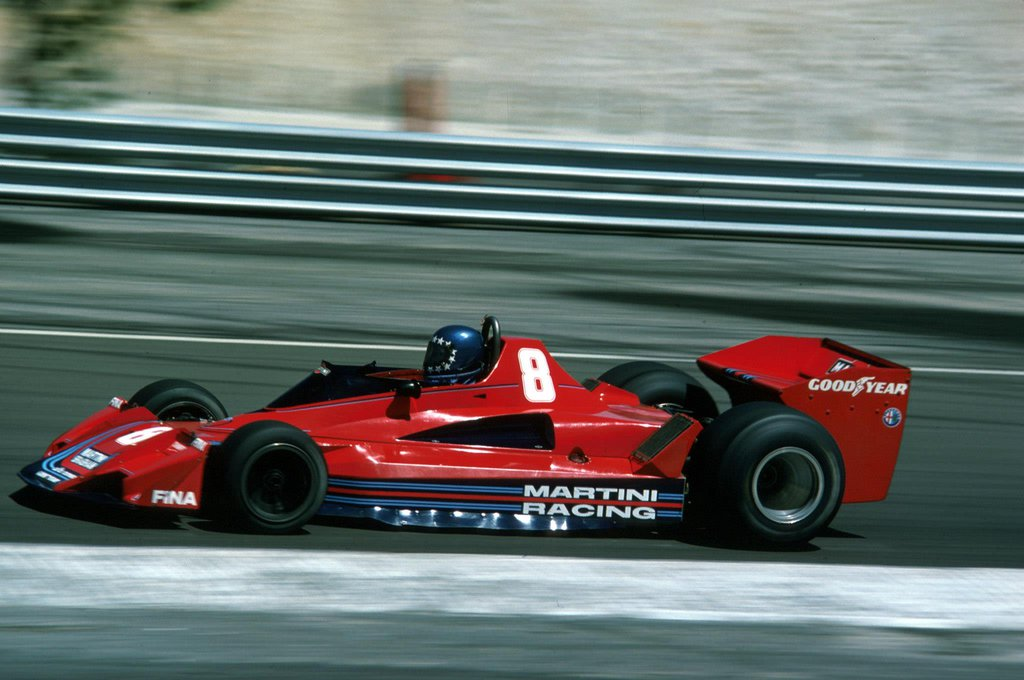
Brabham placed fifth with the BT45 and BT45B

| Pos | Constructor | ARG (Argentina) | BRA (Brazil) | RSA (South Africa) | USW (United States) | ESP (Spain) | MON (Monaco) | BEL (Belgium) | SWE (Sweden) | FRA (France) | GBR (United Kingdom) | GER (West Germany) | AUT (Austria) | NED (Netherlands) | ITA (Italy) | USA (United States) | CAN (Canada) | JPN (Japan) | Pts |
|---|---|---|---|---|---|---|---|---|---|---|---|---|---|---|---|---|---|---|---|
| 1 | (Italy) Ferrari | 3 | 1 | 1 | 2 | 2 | 2 | 2 | 3 | 5 | 2 | 1 | 2 | 1 | 2 | 4 | 12 | 2 | 95 (97) |
| 2 | (United Kingdom) Lotus-Ford | 5 | 5 | 12 | 1 | 1 | 5 | 1 | 6 | 1 | 3 | Ret | Ret | Ret | 1 | 2 | 9 | Ret | 62 |
| 3 | (United Kingdom) McLaren-Ford | Ret | 2 | 4 | 7 | 4 | 4 | 7 | 2 | 3 | 1 | Ret | 6 | 9 | 4 | 1 | 3 | 1 | 60 |
| 4 | (Canada) Wolf-Ford | 1 | Ret | 2 | 3 | 3 | 1 | Ret | Ret | Ret | Ret | 2 | Ret | 3 | Ret | 3 | 1 | 10 | 55 |
| 5 | (United Kingdom) Brabham-Alfa Romeo | 2 | Ret | 6 | Ret | 6 | Ret | 6 | 5 | 2 | 5 | 3 | 3 | 7 | Ret | 12 | Ret | 7 | 27 |
| 6 | (United Kingdom) Tyrrell-Ford | Ret | Ret | 3 | 4 | 8 | Ret | 3 | 4 | 12 | Ret | 9 | 5 | Ret | 6 | 14 | 2 | 3 | 27 |
| 7 | (United Kingdom) Shadow-Ford | NC | 6 | Ret | Ret | Ret | 6 | 5 | 9 | Ret | 7 | 10 | 1 | 13 | 3 | 9 | 4 | 4 | 23 |
| 8 | (France) Ligier-Matra | NC | Ret | Ret | 9 | 7 | 7 | Ret | 1 | 8 | 6 | Ret | Ret | 2 | 8 | 7 | Ret | 5 | 18 |
| 9 | (Brazil) Copersucar-Ford | 4 | 4 | 10 | 5 | 14 | Ret | Ret | 18 | 11 | Ret | DNQ | 11 | 4 | DNQ | 13 | Ret | | 11 |
| 10 | (United Kingdom) Ensign-Ford | 6 | Ret | 9 | Ret | Ret | 10 | Ret | 7 | 7 | Ret | 6 | Ret | 5 | 5 | 5 | 5 | Ret | 10 |
| 11 | (United Kingdom) Surtees-Ford | 7 | Ret | 7 | 11 | 9 | 8 | 4 | Ret | 13 | 8 | 5 | 15 | 12 | Ret | 11 | 6 | 8 | 6 |
| 12 | (United States) Penske-Ford | | | | 6 | DNQ | 11 | 11 | 8 | Ret | 9 | Ret | 12 | 8 | Ret | Ret | 7 | | 1 |
| — | (United Kingdom) March-Ford | Ret | Ret | 14 | 10 | 10 | DNQ | 10 | 15 | NC | 10 | 8 | 9 | 10 | 7 | 15 | 8 | 12 | 0 |
| — | (United Kingdom) Hesketh-Ford | | | | WD | Ret | 12 | 9 | 13 | 10 | Ret | Ret | 7 | Ret | 9 | 8 | Ret | | 0 |
| — | (Japan) Kojima-Ford | | | | | | | | | | | | | | | | | 11 | 0 |
| — | (United Kingdom) LEC-Ford | | | | | DNQ | WD | 13 | 14 | Ret | DNPQ | | | | | | | | 0 |
| — | (United Kingdom) BRM | WD | Ret | 15 | WD | DNQ | | DNQ | DNQ | DNQ | DNPQ | DNQ | WD | DNQ | DNQ | | | | 0 |
| — | (France) Renault | | | | | | | | | WD | Ret | WD | WD | Ret | Ret | Ret | DNQ | | 0 |
| — | (Netherlands) Boro-Ford | | | | | | | | | | | | | DSQ | DNQ | | | | 0 |
| — | (Switzerland) Apollon-Ford | | | | | | | WD | | WD | | | WD | WD | DNQ | | | | 0 |
| — | (Australia) McGuire-Ford | | | | | | | | | | DNPQ | | | | | | | | 0 |
| Pos | Constructor | ARG (Argentina) | BRA (Brazil) | RSA (South Africa) | USW (United States) | ESP (Spain) | MON (Monaco) | BEL (Belgium) | SWE (Sweden) | FRA (France) | GBR (United Kingdom) | GER (West Germany) | AUT (Austria) | NED (Netherlands) | ITA (Italy) | USA (United States) | CAN (Canada) | JPN (Japan) | Pts |

- Bold results counted to championship.

== Non-championship race ==
A single non-championship race for Formula One cars was held in 1977:

| Race name | Circuit | Date | Winning driver | Constructor | Report |
|---|---|---|---|---|---|
| (United Kingdom) XII Race of Champions | Brands Hatch | 20 March | (United Kingdom) James Hunt | (United Kingdom) McLaren-Cosworth | Report |
