= 1977 Italian Grand Prix =

- Race 14 of 17 in the 1977 Formula One season
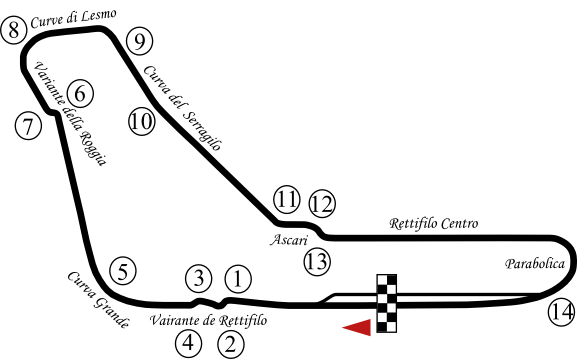

Race details
- Date: 11 September 1977
- Location: Autodromo Nazionale di Monza, Monza
- Course: Permanent racing facility
- Course length: 5.800 km (3.604 miles)
- Distance: 52 laps, 301.600 km (187.2 miles)
- Weather: Dry

Pole position
Driver	(United Kingdom) James Hunt	McLaren-Ford
- Time: 1:38.08

Fastest lap
Driver	(United States) Mario Andretti	Lotus-Ford
- Time: 1:39.10 on lap 31

Podium
First	(United States) Mario Andretti	Lotus-Ford
Second	(Austria) Niki Lauda	Ferrari
Third	(Australia) Alan Jones	Shadow-Ford

The 1977 Italian Grand Prix was a Formula One motor race held at Monza on 11 September 1977. It was the fourteenth race of the 1977 World Championship of F1 Drivers and the 1977 International Cup for F1 Constructors.

== Qualifying ==
=== Qualifying classification ===
Pos.	Driver	Constructor	Time
1	(United Kingdom) James Hunt	McLaren–Ford	1:38.08
2	(Argentina) Carlos Reutemann	Ferrari	1:38.15
3	(South Africa) Jody Scheckter	Wolf–Ford	1:38.29
4	(United States) Mario Andretti	Lotus–Ford	1:38.37
5	(Austria) Niki Lauda	Ferrari	1:38.54
6	(Italy) Riccardo Patrese	Shadow–Ford	1:38.68
7	(Switzerland) Clay Regazzoni	Ensign–Ford	1:38.68
8	(France) Jacques Laffite	Ligier–Matra	1:38.77
9	(West Germany) Jochen Mass	McLaren–Ford	1:38.86
10	(Italy) Vittorio Brambilla	Surtees–Ford	1:38.92
11	(West Germany) Hans-Joachim Stuck	Brabham–Alfa Romeo	1:39.05
12	(Sweden) Ronnie Peterson	Tyrrell–Ford	1:39.17
13	(France) Patrick Depailler	Tyrrell–Ford	1:39.18
14	(United Kingdom) John Watson	Brabham–Alfa Romeo	1:39.21
15	(Italy) Bruno Giacomelli	McLaren–Ford	1:39.42
16	(Australia) Alan Jones	Shadow–Ford	1:39.50
17	(South Africa) Ian Scheckter	March–Ford	1:39.62
18	(France) Jean-Pierre Jarier	Penske–Ford	1:39.63
19	(Sweden) Gunnar Nilsson	Lotus–Ford	1:39.85
20	(France) Jean-Pierre Jabouille	Renault	1:40.03
21	(France) Patrick Tambay	Ensign–Ford	1:40.19
22	(United States) Brett Lunger	McLaren–Ford	1:40.26
23	(United Kingdom) Rupert Keegan	Hesketh–Ford	1:40.28
24	(Belgium) Patrick Nève	March–Ford	1:40.51
Cut-off
25	(Brazil) Alex Ribeiro	March–Ford	1:40.79
26	(Brazil) Emerson Fittipaldi	Fittipaldi–Ford	1:40.97
27	(Italy) Lamberto Leoni	Surtees–Ford	1:41.03
28	(United Kingdom) Brian Henton	Boro–Ford	1:41.13
29	(Spain) Emilio de Villota	McLaren–Ford	1:41.21
30	(United Kingdom) Ian Ashley	Hesketh–Ford	1:41.22
31	(Belgium) Teddy Pilette	BRM	1:41.92
32	(Austria) Hans Binder	Penske–Ford	1:43.10
33	(Switzerland) Loris Kessel	Apollon–Ford	1:46.68
34	(Italy) Giorgio Francia	Brabham–Alfa Romeo	1:49.67

== Race ==
=== Report ===
The fact that it was Ferrari's home race did not deter James Hunt who took pole, whereas Carlos Reutemann cheered the home fans by starting second in front of Jody Scheckter. Scheckter took the lead after a brilliant start, and in second place was Clay Regazzoni's Ensign who got an even better one. Regazzoni however did not have the pace and soon dropped down the order, whereas Mario Andretti was on the move, passing Hunt on the second lap, and Scheckter a few laps later to take the lead. Hunt dropped back with brake troubles as the race progressed, and Scheckter retired when his engine failed, leaving Reutemann and Niki Lauda in second and third. Lauda was soon past Reutemann, and the latter had to retire when he spun off on oil on the track left by the car of debutant Bruno Giacomelli, handing third to Alan Jones. The race finished in that order; with Andretti taking a dominant victory from Lauda, who closed in on the championship, and Jones who took his second podium in three races. By finishing 2nd, Ferrari won the Constructor's Championship with three races left.

=== Classification ===
Pos	No	Driver	Constructor	Tyre	Laps	Time/Retired	Grid	Points
1	5	(United States) Mario Andretti	Lotus-Ford	G	52	1:27:50.30	4	9
2	11	(Austria) Niki Lauda	Ferrari	G	52	+16.96	5	6
3	17	(Australia) Alan Jones	Shadow-Ford	G	52	+23.63	16	4
4	2	(West Germany) Jochen Mass	McLaren-Ford	G	52	+28.48	9	3
5	22	(Switzerland) Clay Regazzoni	Ensign-Ford	G	52	+30.11	7	2
6	3	(Sweden) Ronnie Peterson	Tyrrell-Ford	G	52	+1:19.22	12	1
7	27	(Belgium) Patrick Nève	March-Ford	G	50	+ 2 Laps	24	
8	26	(France) Jacques Laffite	Ligier-Matra	G	50	+ 2 Laps	8	
9	24	(United Kingdom) Rupert Keegan	Hesketh-Ford	G	48	+ 4 Laps	23	
Ret	10	(South Africa) Ian Scheckter	March-Ford	G	41	Transmission	17	
Ret	12	(Argentina) Carlos Reutemann	Ferrari	G	39	Spun Off	2	
Ret	16	(Italy) Riccardo Patrese	Shadow-Ford	G	39	Spun Off	6	
Ret	14	(Italy) Bruno Giacomelli	McLaren-Ford	G	38	Engine	15	
Ret	8	(West Germany) Hans-Joachim Stuck	Brabham-Alfa Romeo	G	31	Engine	11	
Ret	1	(United Kingdom) James Hunt	McLaren-Ford	G	26	Spun Off	1	
Ret	4	(France) Patrick Depailler	Tyrrell-Ford	G	24	Engine	13	
Ret	20	(South Africa) Jody Scheckter	Wolf-Ford	G	23	Engine	3	
Ret	15	(France) Jean-Pierre Jabouille	Renault	MI	23	Engine	20	
Ret	34	(France) Jean-Pierre Jarier	Penske-Ford	G	19	Engine	18	
Ret	23	(France) Patrick Tambay	Ensign-Ford	G	9	Engine	21	
Ret	19	(Italy) Vittorio Brambilla	Surtees-Ford	G	5	Accident	10	
Ret	6	(Sweden) Gunnar Nilsson	Lotus-Ford	G	4	Suspension	22	
Ret	30	(United States) Brett Lunger	McLaren-Ford	G	4	Engine	19	
Ret	7	(United Kingdom) John Watson	Brabham-Alfa Romeo	G	3	Accident	14	
DNQ	9	(Brazil) Alex Ribeiro	March-Ford	G				
DNQ	28	(Brazil) Emerson Fittipaldi	Fittipaldi-Ford	G				
DNQ	18	(Italy) Lamberto Leoni	Surtees-Ford	G				
DNQ	38	(United Kingdom) Brian Henton	Boro-Ford	G				
DNQ	36	(Spain) Emilio de Villota	McLaren-Ford	G				
DNQ	25	(United Kingdom) Ian Ashley	Hesketh-Ford	G				
DNQ	35	(Belgium) Teddy Pilette	BRM	G				
DNQ	33	(Austria) Hans Binder	Penske-Ford	G				
DNQ	41	(Switzerland) Loris Kessel	Apollon-Ford	G				
DNQ	21	(Italy) Giorgio Francia	Brabham-Alfa Romeo	G				

== Notes ==
- This was the Formula One World Championship debut for Italian drivers Bruno Giacomelli, Giorgio Francia and Lamberto Leoni.
- This was the Formula One World Championship debut for Swiss constructor Apollon.
- This was the final Formula One World Championship entry for British Racing Motors.

== Championship standings after the race ==
- **Bold text** indicates the World Champions.

Drivers' Championship standings

Pos	Driver	Points
1	(Austria) **Niki Lauda***	69
2	(South Africa) **Jody Scheckter***	42
3	(Argentina) Carlos Reutemann	41
4	(United States) Mario Andretti	35
5	(United Kingdom) James Hunt	22

Constructors' Championship standings

Pos	Constructor	Points
1	(Italy) **Ferrari**	86 (88)
2	(United Kingdom) Lotus-Ford	56
3	(Canada) Wolf-Ford	42
4	(United Kingdom) McLaren-Ford	38
5	(United Kingdom) Brabham-Alfa Romeo	27

- Note: Only the top five positions are included for both sets of standings. Only the best 8 results from the first 9 races and the best 7 results from the remaining 8 races were retained. Numbers without parentheses are retained points; numbers in parentheses are total points scored.
- **Bold text** indicates the 1977 World Constructors' Champion.
- Competitors in bold and marked with an asterisk still had a theoretical chance of becoming World Champion.

Previous race: 1977 Dutch Grand Prix	FIA Formula One World Championship; 1977 season	Next race: 1977 United States Grand Prix
Previous race: 1976 Italian Grand Prix	Italian Grand Prix	Next race: 1978 Italian Grand Prix
