= 1977 United States Grand Prix =

- Race 15 of 17 in the 1977 Formula One season
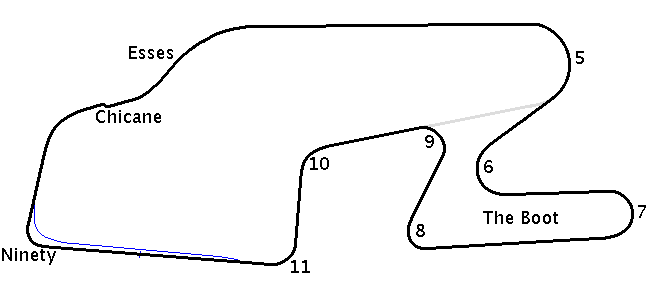

Race details
- Date: October 2, 1977
- Official name: XX Toyota Grand Prix of the United States
- Location: Watkins Glen Grand Prix Race Course; Watkins Glen, New York
- Course: Permanent road course
- Course length: 5.435 km (3.377 miles)
- Distance: 59 laps, 320.67 km (199.24 miles)
- Weather: Rain with temperatures reaching up to 17 °C (63 °F); Winds gusting up to 23.69 km/h (14.72 mph)

Pole position
Driver	(United Kingdom) James Hunt	McLaren-Ford
- Time: 1:40.863

Fastest lap
Driver	(Sweden) Ronnie Peterson	Tyrrell-Ford
- Time: 1:51.85 on lap 56

Podium
First	(United Kingdom) James Hunt	McLaren-Ford
Second	(United States) Mario Andretti	Lotus-Ford
Third	(South Africa) Jody Scheckter	Wolf-Ford

The 1977 United States Grand Prix was a Formula One motor race held on October 2, 1977, at the Watkins Glen Grand Prix Race Course in Watkins Glen, New York. It was the fifteenth race of the 1977 World Championship of F1 Drivers and the 1977 International Cup for F1 Constructors. The event was also referred to as the United States Grand Prix East in order to distinguish it from the United States Grand Prix West held on April 3, 1977, in Long Beach, California. It was covered on American radio by Motor Racing Network.

The 59-lap race was won from pole position by James Hunt, driving a McLaren-Ford. In wet conditions, Hunt held off a late charge from Mario Andretti in the Lotus-Ford to take his second consecutive Watkins Glen victory. Jody Scheckter was third in the Wolf-Ford, while Niki Lauda clinched his second Drivers' Championship by finishing fourth in his Ferrari.

== Report ==
For the first time, the American race was being held before the Canadian Grand Prix, which would follow a week later. Lauda led the championship with 69 points, while Jody Scheckter was second with 42 points. With nine points being awarded for a win, Lauda needed only to score one point in any of the final three races to clinch the title, while Scheckter needed to win them all to have a chance, and also hope that Lauda did not score at all in those 3 races. (Had that happened, both Scheckter and Lauda would be on 69 points, but Scheckter would have the tiebreaker on wins with 5, compared to Lauda's 3).

From the start of practice on Friday, Hunt's McLaren was dominant, setting a track record of 1:40.863. Brabham teammates Hans-Joachim Stuck and John Watson were a quarter of a second back, followed by Andretti, Ronnie Peterson and the Ferraris of Carlos Reutemann and Lauda. On Saturday morning there was rain just before the end of untimed practice, and so the afternoon session served only as practice for a possible wet race on Sunday, as Friday's times determined the grid.

Sunday began cold but dry, with a crowd over 100,000. Before the warmup, however, it began to drizzle, and by the five-minute signal, it had picked up enough that only John Watson was willing to gamble on starting with slicks. At the flag, everyone got away from the grid and through the first turn without incident, but the spray was so heavy that nothing was visible after the first five cars. Stuck quickly jumped ahead of Hunt, and after one lap, they were followed by Andretti, Reutemann, Peterson, Lauda, Scheckter, Jacques Laffite and Gunnar Nilsson.

Immediately, Scheckter began to take advantage of the others' uncertainty in the conditions and, by lap five had moved from ninth to fourth. Stuck was also going well in the wet, and, despite losing his clutch cable in the first few laps, pulled away from Hunt. Lauda passed his teammate Reutemann for fifth spot when the Argentine spun. On lap 15, with Hunt four seconds behind, Stuck, struggling to make gear changes without a clutch, popped out of gear entering a corner and went straight on. He retired with damage to the monocoque.

Hunt now led Andretti by 10.5 seconds, with Scheckter 14 seconds further back in third. The rain stopped, and drivers sought the wet sections of a drying track to cool their tires. With 10 laps remaining and the lead at 22 seconds, Hunt backed off in response to a pit signal. Lauda was coasting in fourth, a position sufficient to clinch the Championship. Scheckter had slowed in third to preserve his tires.

With two laps to go, Andretti, who had been closing while Hunt cruised home, was only 6.7 seconds behind. As they began the last lap, the margin had closed to 1.5 seconds, but Hunt increased his lead slightly to win by just over two seconds. The McLaren pit had not informed him how close the Lotus was until the start of the final lap, when Teddy Mayer gave him a frantic wave to pick up the pace.

Lauda thus took his second title, and Ferrari took their third consecutive Constructor's Championship. For Lauda, it was the culmination of a comeback from the life-threatening injuries he had sustained at the Nürburgring in 1976. Almost immediately, the Austrian quit Ferrari, having already announced his intention to move to Brabham for 1978.

== Classification ==
=== Qualifying ===
Pos.	Driver	Constructor	Time
1	(United Kingdom) James Hunt	McLaren–Ford	1:40.863
2	(West Germany) Hans-Joachim Stuck	Brabham–Alfa Romeo	+0.275
3	(United Kingdom) John Watson	Brabham–Alfa Romeo	+0.330
4	(United States) Mario Andretti	Lotus–Ford	+0.618
5	(Sweden) Ronnie Peterson	Tyrrell–Ford	+1.045
6	(Argentina) Carlos Reutemann	Ferrari	+1.089
7	(Austria) Niki Lauda	Ferrari	+1.226
8	(France) Patrick Depailler	Tyrrell–Ford	+1.375
9	(South Africa) Jody Scheckter	Wolf–Ford	+1.452
10	(France) Jacques Laffite	Ligier–Matra	+1.777
11	(Italy) Vittorio Brambilla	Surtees–Ford	+1.923
12	(Sweden) Gunnar Nilsson	Lotus–Ford	+1.952
13	(Australia) Alan Jones	Shadow–Ford	+2.156
14	(France) Jean-Pierre Jabouille	Renault	+2.206
15	(West Germany) Jochen Mass	McLaren–Ford	+2.379
16	(France) Jean-Pierre Jarier	Shadow–Ford	+2.653
17	(United States) Brett Lunger	McLaren–Ford	+2.835
18	(Brazil) Emerson Fittipaldi	Fittipaldi–Ford	+3.075
19	(Switzerland) Clay Regazzoni	Ensign–Ford	+3.345
20	(United Kingdom) Rupert Keegan	Hesketh–Ford	+3.687
21	(South Africa) Ian Scheckter	March–Ford	+3.839
22	(United Kingdom) Ian Ashley	Hesketh–Ford	+4.237
23	(Brazil) Alex Ribeiro	March–Ford	+4.610
24	(Belgium) Patrick Nève	March–Ford	+4.982
25	(Austria) Hans Binder	Surtees–Ford	+5.017
26	(United States) Danny Ongais	Penske–Ford	+5.207
Cut-off
27	(France) Patrick Tambay	Ensign–Ford	+8.572

=== Race ===
Pos	No	Driver	Constructor	Tyre	Laps	Time/Retired	Grid	Points
1	1	(United Kingdom) James Hunt	McLaren-Ford	G	59	1:58:23.267	1	9
2	5	(United States) Mario Andretti	Lotus-Ford	G	59	+ 2.026	4	6
3	20	(South Africa) Jody Scheckter	Wolf-Ford	G	59	+ 1:18.879	9	4
4	11	(Austria) Niki Lauda	Ferrari	G	59	+ 1:40.615	7	3
5	22	(Switzerland) Clay Regazzoni	Ensign-Ford	G	59	+ 1:48.138	19	2
6	12	(Argentina) Carlos Reutemann	Ferrari	G	58	+ 1 Lap	6	1
7	26	(France) Jacques Laffite	Ligier-Matra	G	58	+ 1 Lap	10	
8	24	(United Kingdom) Rupert Keegan	Hesketh-Ford	G	58	+ 1 Lap	20	
9	16	(France) Jean-Pierre Jarier	Shadow-Ford	G	58	+ 1 Lap	16	
10	30	(United States) Brett Lunger	McLaren-Ford	G	57	+ 2 Laps	17	
11	18	(Austria) Hans Binder	Surtees-Ford	G	57	+ 2 Laps	25	
12	7	(United Kingdom) John Watson	Brabham-Alfa Romeo	G	57	+ 2 Laps	3	
13	28	(Brazil) Emerson Fittipaldi	Fittipaldi-Ford	G	57	+ 2 Laps	18	
14	4	(France) Patrick Depailler	Tyrrell-Ford	G	56	+ 3 Laps	8	
15	9	(Brazil) Alex Ribeiro	March-Ford	G	56	+ 3 Laps	23	
16	3	(Sweden) Ronnie Peterson	Tyrrell-Ford	G	56	+ 3 Laps	5	
17	25	(United Kingdom) Ian Ashley	Hesketh-Ford	G	55	+ 4 Laps	22	
18	27	(Belgium) Patrick Nève	March-Ford	G	55	+ 4 Laps	24	
19	19	(Italy) Vittorio Brambilla	Surtees-Ford	G	54	+ 5 Laps	11	
Ret	15	(France) Jean-Pierre Jabouille	Renault	M	30	Alternator	14	
Ret	6	(Sweden) Gunnar Nilsson	Lotus-Ford	G	17	Accident	12	
Ret	8	(West Germany) Hans-Joachim Stuck	Brabham-Alfa Romeo	G	14	Accident	2	
Ret	10	(South Africa) Ian Scheckter	March-Ford	G	10	Accident	21	
Ret	2	(West Germany) Jochen Mass	McLaren-Ford	G	8	Fuel Pump	15	
Ret	14	(United States) Danny Ongais	Penske-Ford	G	6	Accident	26	
Ret	17	(Australia) Alan Jones	Shadow-Ford	G	3	Accident	13	
DNQ	23	(France) Patrick Tambay	Ensign-Ford	G				

== Notes ==
- This was the Formula One World Championship debut for American driver Danny Ongais.
- This was the 100th race in which a South African driver participated. In those 100 races, South African drivers won 6 Grands Prix, achieved 25 podium finishes, 2 pole positions and 4 fastest laps.
- This race marked the 250th podium finish for a British driver.
- This was the 100th Grand Prix start for Tyrrell. In those 100 races, Tyrrell won 20 Grands Prix, achieved 58 podium finishes, 14 pole positions, 16 fastest laps, 3 Grand Slams and won 2 Driver's and 1 Constructor's Championships.
- This was the 50th Grand Prix start for Hesketh.
- This was the 10th United States Grand Prix win for a Ford-powered car.

== Championship standings after the race ==
Drivers' Championship standings

	Pos	Driver	Points
	1	(Austria) **Niki Lauda**	72
2	2	(United States) Mario Andretti	47
1	3	(South Africa) Jody Scheckter	46
1	4	(Argentina) Carlos Reutemann	36
	5	(United Kingdom) James Hunt	31

Constructors' Championship standings

	Pos	Constructor	Points
	1	(Italy) **Ferrari**	89 (91)
	2	(United Kingdom) Lotus-Ford	62
1	3	(United Kingdom) McLaren-Ford	47
1	4	(Canada) Wolf-Ford	46
	5	(United Kingdom) Brabham-Alfa Romeo	27

- Note: Only the top five positions are included for both sets of standings. Only the best 8 results from the first 9 races and the best 7 results from the remaining 8 races were retained. Numbers without parentheses are retained points; numbers in parentheses are total points scored.
- **Bold text** indicates the 1977 World Champions.

Previous race: 1977 Italian Grand Prix	FIA Formula One World Championship; 1977 season	Next race: 1977 Canadian Grand Prix
Previous race: 1976 United States Grand Prix	United States Grand Prix	Next race: 1978 United States Grand Prix
