= Alfa Romeo Grand Prix results =

The table below details the European Championship results of Alfa Romeo. The other tables show the results of Alfa Romeo in Formula One.

== Complete European Championship results ==
(key) (results in bold indicate pole position, results in italics indicate fastest lap)

Year	Entrant	Chassis	Engine	Drivers	1	2	3	4	5	6	7
1931	SA Alfa Romeo	Alfa Romeo 8C-2300	2.3 L8		ITA	FRA	BEL				
1931	SA Alfa Romeo	Alfa Romeo 8C-2300	2.3 L8	(Italy) Luigi Arcangeli	DNS						
1931	SA Alfa Romeo	Alfa Romeo 8C-2300	2.3 L8	(Italy) Baconin Borzacchini	2^{1}		2				
1931	SA Alfa Romeo	Alfa Romeo 8C-2300	2.3 L8	(Italy) Giuseppe Campari	1		Ret				
1931	SA Alfa Romeo	Alfa Romeo 8C-2300	2.3 L8	(Italy) Attilio Marinoni	DNS						
1931	SA Alfa Romeo	Alfa Romeo 8C-2300	2.3 L8	(Italy) Ferdinando Minoia	2		**3**				
1931	SA Alfa Romeo	Alfa Romeo 8C-2300	2.3 L8	(Italy) Giovanni Minozzi			**3**				
1931	SA Alfa Romeo	Alfa Romeo 8C-2300	2.3 L8	(Italy) Tazio Nuvolari	1^{1}		2				
1931	SA Alfa Romeo	Alfa Romeo 8C-2300	2.3 L8	(Italy) Goffredo Zehender	DNS		Ret				
1931	SA Alfa Romeo	Alfa Romeo Tipo A	2x 3.5 L6	(Italy) Baconin Borzacchini	Ret						
1931	SA Alfa Romeo	Alfa Romeo Tipo A	2x 3.5 L6	(Italy) Tazio Nuvolari	Ret						
1931	SA Alfa Romeo	Alfa Romeo Monza	2.3 L8	(Italy) Baconin Borzacchini		2					
1931	SA Alfa Romeo	Alfa Romeo Monza	2.3 L8	(Italy) Giuseppe Campari		2					
1931	SA Alfa Romeo	Alfa Romeo Monza	2.3 L8	(Italy) Ferdinando Minoia		6					
1931	SA Alfa Romeo	Alfa Romeo Monza	2.3 L8	(Italy) Giovanni Minozzi		11					
1931	SA Alfa Romeo	Alfa Romeo Monza	2.3 L8	(Italy) Tazio Nuvolari		11					
1931	SA Alfa Romeo	Alfa Romeo Monza	2.3 L8	(Italy) Goffredo Zehender		6					
1931	F. Pirola	Alfa Romeo 6C-1500	1.5 L6	(Italy) Giovanni Lurani	6						
1931	F. Pirola	Alfa Romeo 6C-1500	1.5 L6	(Italy) Francesco Pirola	6						
1931	A. Caniato	Alfa Romeo 6C 1750	1.8 L8	(Italy) Alfredo Caniato	Ret						
1931	A. Caniato	Alfa Romeo 6C 1750	1.8 L8	(Italy) Mario Tadini	Ret						
1931	Jean Pesato	Alfa Romeo 6C 1750	1.8 L6	(France) Pierre Félix		10	6				
1931	Jean Pesato	Alfa Romeo 6C 1750	1.8 L6	(France) Jean Pesato		10	6				
1931	Sir Henry Birkin	Alfa Romeo 8C-2300	2.3 L8	(United Kingdom) Henry Birkin			4				
1931	Sir Henry Birkin	Alfa Romeo 8C-2300	2.3 L8	(United Kingdom) Brian Lewis			4				
1932	SA Alfa Romeo	Alfa Romeo Tipo B/P3	2.6 L8		ITA	FRA	GER				
1932	SA Alfa Romeo	Alfa Romeo Tipo B/P3	2.6 L8	(Italy) Baconin Borzacchini		2	3				
1932	SA Alfa Romeo	Alfa Romeo Tipo B/P3	2.6 L8	(Italy) Giuseppe Campari	4						
1932	SA Alfa Romeo	Alfa Romeo Tipo B/P3	2.6 L8	(Germany) Rudolf Caracciola		3	**1**				
1932	SA Alfa Romeo	Alfa Romeo Tipo B/P3	2.6 L8	(Italy) Tazio Nuvolari	1	1	2				
1932	SA Alfa Romeo	Alfa Romeo Monza	2.3 L8	(Italy) Baconin Borzacchini	**3**						
1932	SA Alfa Romeo	Alfa Romeo Monza	2.3 L8	(Germany) Rudolf Caracciola	11						
1932	SA Alfa Romeo	Alfa Romeo Monza	2.3 L8	(Italy) Attilio Marinoni	3^{1}						
1932	Scuderia Ferrari	Alfa Romeo Monza	2.3 L8	(Italy) Pietro Ghersi	7						
1932	Scuderia Ferrari	Alfa Romeo Monza	2.3 L8	(Italy) Eugenio Siena	9						
1932	C. Gazzabini	Alfa Romeo Monza	2.3 L8	(Italy) Carlo Gazzabini	DNS						
1932	M. Lehoux	Alfa Romeo Monza	2.3 L8	(France) Philippe Étancelin		Ret					
1932	J-P. Wimille	Alfa Romeo Monza	2.3 L8	(France) Jean-Pierre Wimille		Ret					
1932	G. Zehender	Alfa Romeo Monza	2.3 L8	(Italy) Goffredo Zehender		7					
1932	P. Félix	Alfa Romeo Monza	2.3 L8	(France) Pierre Félix		8					
1935	Scuderia Ferrari	Alfa Romeo Tipo B/P3	2.9 L8		MON	FRA	BEL	GER	SUI	ITA	ESP
1935	Scuderia Ferrari	Alfa Romeo Tipo B/P3	2.9 L8	(Italy) Antonio Brivio	3						
1935	Scuderia Ferrari	Alfa Romeo Tipo B/P3	2.9 L8	(Monaco) Louis Chiron	5						
1935	Scuderia Ferrari	Alfa Romeo Tipo B/P3	3.2 L8	(Monaco) Louis Chiron		Ret	3	Ret	Ret		Ret
1935	Scuderia Ferrari	Alfa Romeo Tipo B/P3	3.2 L8	(Italy) Antonio Brivio				Ret			
1935	Scuderia Ferrari	Alfa Romeo Tipo B/P3	3.2 L8	(France) René Dreyfus	2		4	DNS	7		
1935	Scuderia Ferrari	Alfa Romeo Tipo B/P3	3.2 L8	(Italy) Attilio Marinoni			4^{1}			4	
1935	Scuderia Ferrari	Alfa Romeo Tipo B/P3	3.2 L8	(Italy) Tazio Nuvolari	Ret	Ret		1	5		
1935	Scuderia Ferrari	Alfa Romeo 8C-35	3.8 L8	(Italy) Tazio Nuvolari						Ret	Ret
1935	Scuderia Ferrari	Alfa Romeo 8C-35	3.8 L8	(France) René Dreyfus						2	
1935	R. Sommer	Alfa Romeo Tipo B/P3	2.9 L8	(France) Raymond Sommer	6		Ret				
1935	R. Sommer	Alfa Romeo Tipo B/P3	3.2 L8	(France) Raymond Sommer					9		7
1936	Scuderia Ferrari	Alfa Romeo 8C-35	3.8 L8		MON	GER	SUI	ITA			
1936	Scuderia Ferrari	Alfa Romeo 8C-35	3.8 L8	(Italy) Tazio Nuvolari	4						
1936	Scuderia Ferrari	Alfa Romeo 8C-35	3.8 L8	(Italy) Antonio Brivio	5						
1936	Scuderia Ferrari	Alfa Romeo 8C-35	3.8 L8	(Italy) Giuseppe Farina	Ret		Ret				
1936	Scuderia Ferrari	Alfa Romeo 8C-35	3.8 L8	(Italy) Mario Tadini	Ret						
1936	Scuderia Ferrari	Alfa Romeo 8C-35	3.8 L8	(Italy) Carlo Pintacuda				5			
1936	Scuderia Ferrari	Alfa Romeo 12C 1936	4.1 V12	(Italy) Tazio Nuvolari		Ret	Ret	2			
1936	Scuderia Ferrari	Alfa Romeo 12C 1936	4.1 V12	(Italy) Antonio Brivio		3					
1936	Scuderia Ferrari	Alfa Romeo 12C 1936	4.1 V12	(Italy) Francesco Severi		Ret					
1936	Scuderia Ferrari	Alfa Romeo 12C 1936	4.1 V12	(France) René Dreyfus			Ret	4			
1936	Scuderia Ferrari	Alfa Romeo 12C 1936	4.1 V12	(Italy) Giuseppe Farina				Ret			
1936	Scuderia Ferrari	Alfa Romeo Tipo C	?	(France) René Dreyfus		Ret					
1936	R. Sommer	Alfa Romeo Tipo B/P3	3.2 L8	(France) Raymond Sommer	7	9	Ret				
1937	Scuderia Ferrari	Alfa Romeo 12C-36	4.1 V12		BEL	GER	MON	SUI	ITA		
1937	Scuderia Ferrari	Alfa Romeo 12C-36	4.1 V12	(France) Raymond Sommer	**5**			8			
1937	Scuderia Ferrari	Alfa Romeo 12C-36	4.1 V12	(Italy) Carlo Felice Trossi	Ret				8		
1937	Scuderia Ferrari	Alfa Romeo 12C-36	4.1 V12	(Italy) Tazio Nuvolari		4			7		
1937	Scuderia Ferrari	Alfa Romeo 12C-36	4.1 V12	(Italy) Attilio Marinoni		11					
1937	Scuderia Ferrari	Alfa Romeo 12C-36	4.1 V12	(Italy) Giuseppe Farina		Ret	6	Ret	Ret		
1937	Scuderia Ferrari	Alfa Romeo 12C-36	4.1 V12	(Italy) Carlo Pintacuda			9				
1937	Scuderia Ferrari	Alfa Romeo 12C-36	4.1 V12	(Italy) Antonio Brivio			Ret				
1937	H. Rüesch	Alfa Romeo 8C-35	3.8 L8	(Switzerland) Hans Rüesch		8	8	Ret			
1937	R. Sommer	Alfa Romeo 8C-35	3.8 L8	(France) Raymond Sommer		Ret	7				
1937	Graf Salvi del Pero	Alfa Romeo 8C-35	3.8 L8	(Italy) Vittorio Belmondo		12			10		
1937	K Evans	Alfa Romeo Tipo B/P3	2.9 L8	(United Kingdom) Kenneth Evans		9					
1937	Scuderia Maremmana	Alfa Romeo Tipo B/P3	2.9 L8	(Italy) Renato Balestrero		Ret					
1937	G. Minozzi	Alfa Romeo Monza	2.3 L8	(Italy) Giovanni Minozzi				Ret			
1937	H. Simonet	Alfa Romeo Tipo B/P3	2.9 L8	(Switzerland) Henri Simonet				Ret			
1937	Alfa Corse	Alfa Romeo 12C/37	4.5 V12	(Italy) Giovanbattista Guidotti					Ret		
1938	Alfa Corse	Alfa Romeo Tipo 312	3.0 V12		FRA	GER	SUI	ITA			
1938	Alfa Corse	Alfa Romeo Tipo 312	3.0 V12	(Italy) Giuseppe Farina		Ret	5				
1938	Alfa Corse	Alfa Romeo Tipo 312	3.0 V12	(Italy) Clemente Biondetti		Ret					
1938	Alfa Corse	Alfa Romeo Tipo 312	3.0 V12	(France) Jean-Pierre Wimille			7	Ret			
1938	Alfa Corse	Alfa Romeo Tipo 312	3.0 V12	(Italy) Piero Taruffi				Ret			
1938	Alfa Corse	Alfa Romeo Tipo 316	3.0 V16	(Italy) Giuseppe Farina				2			
1938	Alfa Corse	Alfa Romeo Tipo 316	3.0 V16	(Italy) Clemente Biondetti				4			
1938	Scuderia Torino	Alfa Romeo 8C 2900A	2.9 L8	(Italy) Pietro Ghersi		8					
1938	Scuderia Torino	Alfa Romeo Tipo 308	3.0 L8	(Italy) Pietro Ghersi				5			
1938	Scuderia Torino	Alfa Romeo Tipo 308	3.0 L8	(Italy) Piero Taruffi		Ret	6				
1938	R. Balestrero	Alfa Romeo Tipo 308	3.0 L8	(Italy) Renato Balestrero		7					
1938	R. Balestrero	Alfa Romeo Tipo 308	3.0 L8	(Italy) Vittorio Belmondo				Ret			
1938	G. Minozzi	Alfa Romeo Monza	2.6 L8	(Italy) Giovanni Minozzi			Ret				
1938	E. Romano	Alfa Romeo Monza	2.6 L8	(Italy) Emilio Romano			12				
1938	J. de Sztriha	Alfa Romeo Monza	2.6 L8	(Hungary) Jstván de Sztriha			Ret				
1939	R. Sommer	Alfa Romeo Tipo 308	3.0 L8		BEL	FRA	GER	SUI			
1939	R. Sommer	Alfa Romeo Tipo 308	3.0 L8	(France) Raymond Sommer	4	5	Ret				
1939	G. Farina	Alfa Romeo Tipo 316	3.0 V16	(Italy) Giuseppe Farina	Ret						
1939	Christian Kautz	Alfa Romeo Tipo 308	3.0 L8	(Italy) Luigi Chinetti		8					
1939	Christian Kautz	Alfa Romeo Tipo 308	3.0 L8	(Switzerland) Christian Kautz		DNS					
1939	Christian Kautz	Alfa Romeo Tipo 308	3.0 L8	(France) Yves Matra		Ret					
1939	K Evans	Alfa Romeo Tipo B	3.0 L8	(United Kingdom) Kenneth Evans				11			
1939	Alfa Corse	Alfa Romeo 158	1.5 L8	(Italy) Giuseppe Farina				7			
1939	Alfa Corse	Alfa Romeo 158	1.5 L8	(Italy) Clemente Biondetti				9			

Notes

- **^1** – Indicates shared drive, no points for the driver who took over.

== Complete Formula One results ==
=== As a constructor ===
==== 1950–1985 ====
(key)

Year	Chassis	Engine(s)	Tyres	Drivers	1	2	3	4	5	6	7	8	9	10	11	12	13	14	15	16	Points	WCC
1950	158	Alfa Romeo 158 1.5 L8 s	P		GBR	MON	500	SUI	BEL	FRA	ITA										—N/a	—N/a^{1}
1950	158	Alfa Romeo 158 1.5 L8 s	P	(Italy) Luigi Fagioli	2	Ret		2	2	2	3										—N/a	—N/a^{1}
1950	158	Alfa Romeo 158 1.5 L8 s	P	(Argentina) Juan Manuel Fangio	Ret	1^{P}^{F}		Ret^{P}	1	1^{P}^{F}	Ret^{P}^{F}^{2}										—N/a	—N/a^{1}
1950	158	Alfa Romeo 158 1.5 L8 s	P	(Italy) Nino Farina	1^{P}^{F}	Ret		1^{F}	4^{P}^{F}	7	1										—N/a	—N/a^{1}
1950	158	Alfa Romeo 158 1.5 L8 s	P	(United Kingdom) Reg Parnell	3																—N/a	—N/a^{1}
1950	158	Alfa Romeo 158 1.5 L8 s	P	(Italy) Consalvo Sanesi							Ret										—N/a	—N/a^{1}
1950	158	Alfa Romeo 158 1.5 L8 s	P	(Italy) Piero Taruffi							Ret^{2}										—N/a	—N/a^{1}
1951	159	Alfa Romeo 158 1.5 L8 s	P		SUI	500	BEL	FRA	GBR	GER	ITA	ESP									—N/a	—N/a^{1}
1951	159	Alfa Romeo 158 1.5 L8 s	P	(Italy) Felice Bonetto					4	Ret	3^{2}	5									—N/a	—N/a^{1}
1951	159	Alfa Romeo 158 1.5 L8 s	P	(Switzerland) Toulo de Graffenried	5						Ret	6									—N/a	—N/a^{1}
1951	159	Alfa Romeo 158 1.5 L8 s	P	(Italy) Luigi Fagioli				1^{2}													—N/a	—N/a^{1}
1951	159	Alfa Romeo 158 1.5 L8 s	P	(Argentina) Juan Manuel Fangio	1^{P}^{F}		9^{P}^{F}	1^{P}^{F}^{2}	2	2^{F}	Ret^{P}	1^{F}									—N/a	—N/a^{1}
1951	159	Alfa Romeo 158 1.5 L8 s	P	(Italy) Nino Farina	3		1	5	Ret^{F}	Ret	3^{F}^{2}	3									—N/a	—N/a^{1}
1951	159	Alfa Romeo 158 1.5 L8 s	P	(Germany) Paul Pietsch						Ret											—N/a	—N/a^{1}
1951	159	Alfa Romeo 158 1.5 L8 s	P	(Italy) Consalvo Sanesi	4		Ret	10	6												—N/a	—N/a^{1}
1952 – 1978: Alfa Romeo did not compete as a constructor.
1979	177; 179	Alfa Romeo 115-12 3.0 F12; Alfa Romeo 1260 3.0 V12	G		ARG	BRA	RSA	USW	ESP	BEL	MON	FRA	GBR	GER	AUT	NED	ITA	CAN	USA		0	NC
1979	177; 179	Alfa Romeo 115-12 3.0 F12; Alfa Romeo 1260 3.0 V12	G	(Italy) Vittorio Brambilla													12	Ret	DNQ		0	NC
1979	177; 179	Alfa Romeo 115-12 3.0 F12; Alfa Romeo 1260 3.0 V12	G	(Italy) Bruno Giacomelli						Ret		17					Ret		Ret		0	NC
1980	179	Alfa Romeo 1260 3.0 V12	G		ARG	BRA	RSA	USW	BEL	MON	FRA	GBR	GER	AUT	NED	ITA	CAN	USA			4	11th
1980	179	Alfa Romeo 1260 3.0 V12	G	(France) Patrick Depailler	Ret	Ret	NC	Ret	Ret	Ret	Ret	Ret									4	11th
1980	179	Alfa Romeo 1260 3.0 V12	G	(Italy) Vittorio Brambilla											Ret	Ret					4	11th
1980	179	Alfa Romeo 1260 3.0 V12	G	(Italy) Andrea de Cesaris													Ret	Ret			4	11th
1980	179	Alfa Romeo 1260 3.0 V12	G	(Italy) Bruno Giacomelli	5	13	Ret	Ret	Ret	Ret	Ret	Ret	5	Ret	Ret	Ret	Ret	Ret^{P}			4	11th
1981	179B; 179C; 179D	Alfa Romeo 1260 3.0 V12	MI		USW	BRA	ARG	SMR	BEL	MON	ESP	FRA	GBR	GER	AUT	NED	ITA	CAN	CPL		10	9th
1981	179B; 179C; 179D	Alfa Romeo 1260 3.0 V12	MI	(United States) Mario Andretti	4	Ret	8	Ret	10	Ret	8	8	Ret	9	Ret	Ret	Ret	7	Ret		10	9th
1981	179B; 179C; 179D	Alfa Romeo 1260 3.0 V12	MI	(Italy) Bruno Giacomelli	Ret	NC	10	Ret	9	Ret	10	15	Ret	15	Ret	Ret	8	4	3		10	9th
1982	179; 182	Alfa Romeo 1260 3.0 V12	MI		RSA	BRA	USW	SMR	BEL	MON	DET	CAN	NED	GBR	FRA	GER	AUT	SUI	ITA	CPL	7	10th
1982	179; 182	Alfa Romeo 1260 3.0 V12	MI	(Italy) Andrea de Cesaris	13	Ret	Ret^{P}	Ret	Ret	3	Ret	6	Ret	Ret	Ret	Ret	Ret	10	10	9	7	10th
1982	179; 182	Alfa Romeo 1260 3.0 V12	MI	(Italy) Bruno Giacomelli	11	Ret	Ret	Ret	Ret	Ret	Ret	Ret	11	7	9	5	Ret	12	Ret	10	7	10th
1983	183T	Alfa Romeo 890T 1.5 V8 t	MI		BRA	USW	FRA	SMR	MON	BEL	DET	CAN	GBR	GER	AUT	NED	ITA	EUR	RSA		18	6th
1983	183T	Alfa Romeo 890T 1.5 V8 t	MI	(Italy) Mauro Baldi	Ret	Ret	Ret	Ret	6	Ret	12	10	7	Ret	Ret	5	Ret	Ret	Ret		18	6th
1983	183T	Alfa Romeo 890T 1.5 V8 t	MI	(Italy) Andrea de Cesaris	EX	Ret	12	Ret	Ret	Ret^{F}	Ret	Ret	8	2	Ret	Ret	Ret	4	2		18	6th
1984	184T	Alfa Romeo 890T 1.5 V8 t	G		BRA	RSA	BEL	SMR	FRA	MON	CAN	DET	DAL	GBR	GER	AUT	NED	ITA	EUR	POR	11	8th
1984	184T	Alfa Romeo 890T 1.5 V8 t	G	(United States) Eddie Cheever	4	Ret	Ret	7	Ret	DNQ	11	Ret	Ret	Ret	Ret	Ret	13	9	Ret	17	11	8th
1984	184T	Alfa Romeo 890T 1.5 V8 t	G	(Italy) Riccardo Patrese	Ret	4	Ret	Ret	Ret	Ret	Ret	Ret	Ret	12	Ret	10	Ret	3	6	8	11	8th
1985	185T; 184TB	Alfa Romeo 890T 1.5 V8 t	G		BRA	POR	SMR	MON	CAN	DET	FRA	GBR	GER	AUT	NED	ITA	BEL	EUR	RSA	AUS	0	NC
1985	185T; 184TB	Alfa Romeo 890T 1.5 V8 t	G	(United States) Eddie Cheever	Ret	Ret	Ret	Ret	17	9	10	Ret	Ret	Ret	Ret	Ret	Ret	11	Ret	Ret	0	NC
1985	185T; 184TB	Alfa Romeo 890T 1.5 V8 t	G	(Italy) Riccardo Patrese	Ret	Ret	Ret	Ret	10	Ret	11	9	Ret	Ret	Ret	Ret	Ret	9	Ret	Ret	0	NC
1986 – 2018: Alfa Romeo did not compete as a constructor.

==== 2019–2023 ====
Key

Key
Colour	Result
Gold	Winner
Silver	Second place
Bronze	Third place
Green	Other points position
Blue	Other classified position
Blue	Not classified, finished (NC)
Purple	Not classified, retired (Ret)
Red	Did not qualify (DNQ)
Black	Disqualified (DSQ)
White	Did not start (DNS)
White	Race cancelled (C)
Blank	Did not practice (DNP)
Blank	Excluded (EX)
Blank	Did not arrive (DNA)
Blank	Withdrawn (WD)
Blank	Did not enter (empty cell)
Annotation	Meaning
P	Pole position
F	Fastest lap
Superscript number	Points-scoring position in sprint

Year	Chassis	Engine(s)	Tyres	Drivers	1	2	3	4	5	6	7	8	9	10	11	12	13	14	15	16	17	18	19	20	21	22	Points	WCC
2019	C38	Ferrari 064 1.6 V6 t	P		AUS	BHR	CHN	AZE	ESP	MON	CAN	FRA	AUT	GBR	GER	HUN	BEL	ITA	SIN	RUS	JPN	MEX	USA	BRA	ABU		57	8th
2019	C38	Ferrari 064 1.6 V6 t	P	(Italy) Antonio Giovinazzi	15	11	15	12	16	19	13	16	10	Ret	13	18	18^{†}	9	10	15	14	14	14	5	16		57	8th
2019	C38	Ferrari 064 1.6 V6 t	P	(Finland) Kimi Räikkönen	8	7	9	10	14	17	15	7	9	8	12	7	16	15	Ret	13	12	Ret	11	4	13		57	8th
2020	C39	Ferrari 065 1.6 V6 t	P		AUT	STY	HUN	GBR	70A	ESP	BEL	ITA	TUS	RUS	EIF	POR	EMI	TUR	BHR	SKH	ABU						8	8th
2020	C39	Ferrari 065 1.6 V6 t	P	(Italy) Antonio Giovinazzi	9	14	17	14	17	16	Ret	16	Ret	11	10	15	10	Ret	16	13	16						8	8th
2020	C39	Ferrari 065 1.6 V6 t	P	(Finland) Kimi Räikkönen	Ret	11	15	17	15	14	12	13	9	14	12	11	9	15	15	14	12						8	8th
2021	C41	Ferrari 065/6 1.6 V6 t	P		BHR	EMI	POR	ESP	MON	AZE	FRA	STY	AUT	GBR	HUN	BEL	NED	ITA	RUS	TUR	USA	MXC	SAP	QAT	SAU	ABU	13	9th
2021	C41	Ferrari 065/6 1.6 V6 t	P	(Italy) Antonio Giovinazzi	12	14	12	15	10	11	15	15	14	13	13	13	14	13	16	11	11	11	14	15	9	Ret	13	9th
2021	C41	Ferrari 065/6 1.6 V6 t	P	(Finland) Kimi Räikkönen	11	13	Ret	12	11	10	17	11	15	15	10	18	WD		8	12	13	8	12	14	15	Ret	13	9th
2021	C41	Ferrari 065/6 1.6 V6 t	P	(Poland) Robert Kubica													15	14									13	9th
2022	C42	Ferrari 066/7 1.6 V6 t	P		BHR	SAU	AUS	EMI	MIA	ESP	MON	AZE	CAN	GBR	AUT	FRA	HUN	BEL	NED	ITA	SIN	JPN	USA	MXC	SAP	ABU	55	6th
2022	C42	Ferrari 066/7 1.6 V6 t	P	(Finland) Valtteri Bottas	6	Ret	8	5^{7}	7	6	9	11	7	Ret	11	14	20†	Ret	Ret	13	11	15	Ret	10	9	15	55	6th
2022	C42	Ferrari 066/7 1.6 V6 t	P	(China) Zhou Guanyu	10	11	11	15	Ret	Ret	16	Ret	8	Ret	14	16†	13	14	16	10	Ret	16^{F}	12	13	12	12	55	6th
2023	C43	Ferrari 066/10 1.6 V6 t	P		BHR	SAU	AUS	AZE	MIA	MON	ESP	CAN	AUT	GBR	HUN	BEL	NED	ITA	SIN	JPN	QAT	USA	MXC	SAP	LVG	ABU	16	9th
2023	C43	Ferrari 066/10 1.6 V6 t	P	(Finland) Valtteri Bottas	8	18	11	18	13	11	19	10	15	12	12	12	14	10	Ret	Ret	8	12	15	Ret	17	19	16	9th
2023	C43	Ferrari 066/10 1.6 V6 t	P	(China) Zhou Guanyu	16^{F}	13	9	Ret	16	13	9	16	12	15	16	13	Ret	14	12	13	9	13	14	Ret	15	17	16	9th

Notes

- ^{†} – The driver did not finish the Grand Prix, but was classified, as he completed over 90% of the race distance.
- **^1** – The Constructors' Championship was not awarded until 1958.
- **^2** – Indicates a shared drive.

=== Non-works entries ===
(key)

Year	Entrant	Chassis	Engine	Tyres	Drivers	1	2	3	4	5	6	7
1950	Johnny Mauro	Alfa Romeo 8C-308	Alfa Romeo 3.0 L8 s	**F**		GBR	MON	500	SUI	BEL	FRA	ITA
1950	Johnny Mauro	Alfa Romeo 8C-308	Alfa Romeo 3.0 L8 s	**F**	(United States) Johnny Mauro			DNQ				

=== As an engine supplier ===
(key)

Year	Entrant	Chassis	Engine	Tyres	Drivers	1	2	3	4	5	6	7	8	9	10	11	12	13	14	15	16	17	Points	WCC
1961	Isobele De Tomaso	De Tomaso F1	Alfa Romeo Giulietta 1.5 L4	D		MON	NED	BEL	FRA	GBR	GER	ITA	USA										0	NC
1961	Isobele De Tomaso	De Tomaso F1	Alfa Romeo Giulietta 1.5 L4	D	(Italy) Roberto Bussinello							Ret											0	NC
1961	Scuderia Serenissima	De Tomaso F1	Alfa Romeo Giulietta 1.5 L4	D	(Italy) Nino Vaccarella							Ret											0	NC
1962	Mike Harris	Cooper T53	Alfa Romeo Giulietta 1.5 L4	D		NED	MON	BEL	FRA	GBR	GER	ITA	USA	RSA									0	NC
1962	Mike Harris	Cooper T53	Alfa Romeo Giulietta 1.5 L4	D	(Federation of Rhodesia and Nyasaland) Mike Harris									Ret									0	NC
1962	Otelle Nucci	LDS Mk1	Alfa Romeo Giulietta 1.5 L4	D	(South Africa) Doug Serrurier									Ret									0	NC
1963	Otelle Nucci	Alfa Special	Alfa Romeo Giulietta 1.5 L4	D		MON	BEL	NED	FRA	GBR	GER	ITA	USA	MEX	RSA								0	NC
1963	Otelle Nucci	Alfa Special	Alfa Romeo Giulietta 1.5 L4	D	(South Africa) Peter de Klerk										Ret								0	NC
1963	Otelle Nucci	LDS Mk1	Alfa Romeo Giulietta 1.5 L4	D	(South Africa) Doug Serrurier										11								0	NC
1963	Sam Tingle	LDS Mk1	Alfa Romeo Giulietta 1.5 L4	D	(Federation of Rhodesia and Nyasaland) Sam Tingle										Ret								0	NC
1964: Alfa Romeo did not supply engines to other teams.
1965	Otelle Nucci	Alfa Special	Alfa Romeo Giulietta 1.5 L4	D		RSA	MON	BEL	FRA	GBR	NED	GER	ITA	USA	MEX								0	NC
1965	Otelle Nucci	Alfa Special	Alfa Romeo Giulietta 1.5 L4	D	(South Africa) Peter de Klerk	10																	0	NC
1965	Jackie Pretorius	LDS Mk1	Alfa Romeo Giulietta 1.5 L4	D	(South Africa) Jackie Pretorius	DNPQ																	0	NC
1965	Sam Tingle	LDS Mk1	Alfa Romeo Giulietta 1.5 L4	D	(Rhodesia) Sam Tingle	13																	0	NC
1966 – 1969: Alfa Romeo did not supply engines to other teams.
1970	Bruce McLaren Motor Racing	McLaren M7D; McLaren M14D	Alfa Romeo T33 3.0 V8	G		RSA	ESP	MON	BEL	NED	FRA	GBR	GER	AUT	ITA	CAN	USA	MEX					0	NC
1970	Bruce McLaren Motor Racing	McLaren M7D; McLaren M14D	Alfa Romeo T33 3.0 V8	G	(Italy) Andrea de Adamich		DNQ	DNQ		DNQ	NC	DNS	DNQ	12	8	Ret	DNQ						0	NC
1970	Bruce McLaren Motor Racing	McLaren M7D; McLaren M14D	Alfa Romeo T33 3.0 V8	G	(Italy) Nanni Galli										DNQ								0	NC
1971	STP March Racing Team	March 711	Alfa Romeo T33 3.0 V8	F		RSA	ESP	MON	NED	FRA	GBR	GER	AUT	ITA	CAN	USA							0	NC
1971	STP March Racing Team	March 711	Alfa Romeo T33 3.0 V8	F	(Italy) Andrea de Adamich	13	Ret			Ret	NC	Ret		Ret		11							0	NC
1971	STP March Racing Team	March 711	Alfa Romeo T33 3.0 V8	F	(Italy) Nanni Galli			DNQ	Ret			12	12										0	NC
1971	STP March Racing Team	March 711	Alfa Romeo T33 3.0 V8	F	(Sweden) Ronnie Peterson					Ret													0	NC
1972 – 1975: Alfa Romeo did not supply engines to other teams.
1976	Martini Racing	Brabham BT45	Alfa Romeo 115-12 3.0 F12	G		BRA	RSA	USW	ESP	BEL	MON	SWE	FRA	GBR	GER	AUT	NED	ITA	CAN	USA	JPN		9	9th
1976	Martini Racing	Brabham BT45	Alfa Romeo 115-12 3.0 F12	G	(Brazil) Carlos Pace	10	Ret	9	6	Ret	9	8	4	8	4	Ret	Ret	Ret	7	Ret	Ret		9	9th
1976	Martini Racing	Brabham BT45	Alfa Romeo 115-12 3.0 F12	G	(Argentina) Carlos Reutemann	12	Ret	Ret	4	Ret	Ret	Ret	11	Ret	Ret	Ret	Ret						9	9th
1976	Martini Racing	Brabham BT45	Alfa Romeo 115-12 3.0 F12	G	(Germany) Rolf Stommelen										6			Ret					9	9th
1976	Martini Racing	Brabham BT45	Alfa Romeo 115-12 3.0 F12	G	(Australia) Larry Perkins														17	Ret	Ret		9	9th
1977	Martini Racing	Brabham BT45; Brabham BT45B	Alfa Romeo 115-12 3.0 F12	G		ARG	BRA	RSA	USW	ESP	MON	BEL	SWE	FRA	GBR	GER	AUT	NED	ITA	USA	CAN	JPN	27	5th
1977	Martini Racing	Brabham BT45; Brabham BT45B	Alfa Romeo 115-12 3.0 F12	G	(Italy) Giorgio Francia														DNQ				27	5th
1977	Martini Racing	Brabham BT45; Brabham BT45B	Alfa Romeo 115-12 3.0 F12	G	(Brazil) Carlos Pace	2	Ret	13															27	5th
1977	Martini Racing	Brabham BT45; Brabham BT45B	Alfa Romeo 115-12 3.0 F12	G	(Germany) Hans Joachim Stuck				Ret	6	Ret	6	10	Ret	5	3	3	7	Ret	Ret	Ret	7	27	5th
1977	Martini Racing	Brabham BT45; Brabham BT45B	Alfa Romeo 115-12 3.0 F12	G	(United Kingdom) John Watson	Ret	Ret	6^{F}	DSQ	Ret	Ret^{P}	Ret	5	2	Ret	Ret	8^{F}	Ret	Ret	12	Ret	Ret	27	5th
1978	Parmalat Racing Team	Brabham BT45C; Brabham BT46; Brabham BT46B; Brabham BT46C	Alfa Romeo 115-12 3.0 F12	G		ARG	BRA	RSA	USW	MON	BEL	ESP	SWE	FRA	GBR	GER	AUT	NED	ITA	USA	CAN		**53**	**3rd**
1978	Parmalat Racing Team	Brabham BT45C; Brabham BT46; Brabham BT46B; Brabham BT46C	Alfa Romeo 115-12 3.0 F12	G	(Austria) Niki Lauda	2	3	Ret^{P}	Ret	2^{F}	Ret	Ret	1^{F}	Ret	2^{F}	Ret	Ret	3^{F}	1	Ret	Ret		**53**	**3rd**
1978	Parmalat Racing Team	Brabham BT45C; Brabham BT46; Brabham BT46B; Brabham BT46C	Alfa Romeo 115-12 3.0 F12	G	(Brazil) Nelson Piquet																11		**53**	**3rd**
1978	Parmalat Racing Team	Brabham BT45C; Brabham BT46; Brabham BT46B; Brabham BT46C	Alfa Romeo 115-12 3.0 F12	G	(United Kingdom) John Watson	Ret	8	3	Ret	4	Ret	5	Ret	4^{P}	3	7	7	4	2	Ret	Ret		**53**	**3rd**
1979	Parmalat Racing Team	Brabham BT46; Brabham BT48	Alfa Romeo 115-12 3.0 F12; Alfa Romeo 1260 3.0 V12	G		ARG	BRA	RSA	USW	ESP	BEL	MON	FRA	GBR	GER	AUT	NED	ITA	CAN	USA			7	8th
1979	Parmalat Racing Team	Brabham BT46; Brabham BT48	Alfa Romeo 115-12 3.0 F12; Alfa Romeo 1260 3.0 V12	G	(Austria) Niki Lauda	Ret	Ret	6	Ret	Ret	Ret	Ret	Ret	Ret	Ret	Ret	Ret	4					7	8th
1979	Parmalat Racing Team	Brabham BT46; Brabham BT48	Alfa Romeo 115-12 3.0 F12; Alfa Romeo 1260 3.0 V12	G	(Brazil) Nelson Piquet	Ret	Ret	7	8	Ret	Ret	Ret	Ret	Ret	12	Ret	4	Ret					7	8th
1980 – 1982: Alfa Romeo did not supply engines to other teams.
1983	Osella Squadra Corse	Osella FA1E	Alfa Romeo 1260 3.0 V12	P		BRA	USW	FRA	SMR	MON	BEL	DET	CAN	GBR	GER	AUT	NED	ITA	EUR	RSA			0	NC
1983	Osella Squadra Corse	Osella FA1E	Alfa Romeo 1260 3.0 V12	P	(Italy) Corrado Fabi									DNQ	DNQ	10	11	Ret	DNQ	Ret			0	NC
1983	Osella Squadra Corse	Osella FA1E	Alfa Romeo 1260 3.0 V12	P	(Italy) Piercarlo Ghinzani				DNQ	DNQ	DNQ	Ret	DNQ	Ret	Ret	11	DNQ	Ret	Ret	Ret			0	NC
1984	Osella Squadra Corse	Osella FA1F	Alfa Romeo 890T 1.5 V8 t	P		BRA	RSA	BEL	SMR	FRA	MON	CAN	DET	DAL	GBR	GER	AUT	NED	ITA	EUR	POR		2	12th
1984	Osella Squadra Corse	Osella FA1F	Alfa Romeo 890T 1.5 V8 t	P	(Italy) Piercarlo Ghinzani	Ret	DNS	Ret	DNQ	12	7	Ret	Ret	5	9	Ret	Ret	Ret	7	Ret	Ret		2	12th
1984	Osella Squadra Corse	Osella FA1F	Alfa Romeo 890T 1.5 V8 t	P	(Austria) Jo Gartner										Ret	Ret	Ret	12	5	Ret	16		2	12th
1984	Osella Squadra Corse	Osella FA1E	Alfa Romeo 1260 3.0 V12	P	(Austria) Jo Gartner				Ret														2	12th
1985	Osella Squadra Corse	Osella FA1F; Osella FA1G	Alfa Romeo 890T 1.5 V8 t	P		BRA	POR	SMR	MON	CAN	DET	FRA	GBR	GER	AUT	NED	ITA	BEL	EUR	RSA	AUS		0	NC
1985	Osella Squadra Corse	Osella FA1F; Osella FA1G	Alfa Romeo 890T 1.5 V8 t	P	(Italy) Piercarlo Ghinzani	12	9	NC	DNQ	Ret	Ret	15	Ret										0	NC
1985	Osella Squadra Corse	Osella FA1F; Osella FA1G	Alfa Romeo 890T 1.5 V8 t	P	(Netherlands) Huub Rothengatter									Ret	9	NC	Ret	NC	DNQ	Ret	7		0	NC
1986	Osella Squadra Corse	Osella FA1G; Osella FA1F; Osella FA1H	Alfa Romeo 890T 1.5 V8 t	P		BRA	ESP	SMR	MON	BEL	CAN	DET	FRA	GBR	GER	HUN	AUT	ITA	POR	MEX	AUS		0	NC
1986	Osella Squadra Corse	Osella FA1G; Osella FA1F; Osella FA1H	Alfa Romeo 890T 1.5 V8 t	P	(Germany) Christian Danner	Ret	Ret	Ret	DNQ	Ret	Ret												0	NC
1986	Osella Squadra Corse	Osella FA1G; Osella FA1F; Osella FA1H	Alfa Romeo 890T 1.5 V8 t	P	(Canada) Allen Berg							Ret	Ret	Ret	12	Ret	Ret		13	16	NC		0	NC
1986	Osella Squadra Corse	Osella FA1G; Osella FA1F; Osella FA1H	Alfa Romeo 890T 1.5 V8 t	P	(Italy) Alex Caffi													NC					0	NC
1986	Osella Squadra Corse	Osella FA1G; Osella FA1F; Osella FA1H	Alfa Romeo 890T 1.5 V8 t	P	(Italy) Piercarlo Ghinzani	Ret	Ret	Ret	DNQ	Ret	Ret	Ret	Ret	Ret	Ret	Ret	11	Ret	Ret	Ret	Ret		0	NC
1987	Osella Squadra Corse	Osella FA1G; Osella FA1I	Alfa Romeo 890T 1.5 V8 t	G		BRA	SMR	BEL	MON	DET	FRA	GBR	GER	HUN	AUT	ITA	POR	ESP	MEX	JPN	AUS		0	NC
1987	Osella Squadra Corse	Osella FA1G; Osella FA1I	Alfa Romeo 890T 1.5 V8 t	G	(Italy) Alex Caffi	Ret	12	Ret	Ret	Ret	Ret	Ret	Ret	Ret	Ret	Ret	Ret	DNQ	Ret	Ret	DNQ		0	NC
1987	Osella Squadra Corse	Osella FA1G; Osella FA1I	Alfa Romeo 890T 1.5 V8 t	G	(Italy) Gabriele Tarquini		Ret																0	NC
1987	Osella Squadra Corse	Osella FA1G; Osella FA1I	Alfa Romeo 890T 1.5 V8 t	G	(Switzerland) Franco Forini											Ret	Ret	DNQ					0	NC

=== Non-championship Formula One results ===
(key) (Results in bold indicate pole position; results in italics indicate fastest lap)

Year	Chassis	Engine(s)	Drivers	1	2	3	4	5	6	7	8	9	10	11	12	13	14	15	16	17
1950	Alfa Romeo 158	Alfa Romeo S8 (s)		PAU	RIC	SRM	PAR	EMP	BAR	JER	ALB	NED	NAT	NOT	ULS	PES	STT	INT	GOO	PEN
1950	Alfa Romeo 158	Alfa Romeo S8 (s)	(Switzerland) Toulo de Graffenried										2							
1950	Alfa Romeo 158	Alfa Romeo S8 (s)	(Italy) Luigi Fagioli													3				
1950	Alfa Romeo 158	Alfa Romeo S8 (s)	(Italy) Nino Farina						1^{P}				6					1^{F}		
1950	Alfa Romeo 158	Alfa Romeo S8 (s)	(Argentina) Juan Manuel Fangio			1			2^{F}				1^{F}			1^{P}^{F}		2^{P}^{F}		
1950	Alfa Romeo 158	Alfa Romeo S8 (s)	(Italy) Piero Taruffi										3^{F}							
1951	Alfa Romeo 159	Alfa Romeo S8 (s)		SYR	PAU	RIC	SRM	BOR	INT	PAR	ULS	SCO	NED	ALB	PES	BAR	GOO			
1951	Alfa Romeo 159	Alfa Romeo S8 (s)	(Italy) Felice Bonetto						10							DNA				
1951	Alfa Romeo 159	Alfa Romeo S8 (s)	(Argentina) Juan Manuel Fangio						4							1^{P}^{F}				
1951	Alfa Romeo 159	Alfa Romeo S8 (s)	(Italy) Nino Farina						9		1^{P}^{F}					Ret	1^{F}			
1951	Alfa Romeo 159	Alfa Romeo S8 (s)	(Italy) Consalvo Sanesi						16											
1979	Alfa Romeo 177	Alfa Romeo F12		ROC	NIL	DIN														
1979	Alfa Romeo 177	Alfa Romeo F12	(Italy) Vittorio Brambilla			9														
1979	Alfa Romeo 179	Alfa Romeo V12	(Italy) Bruno Giacomelli			Ret														
1980	Alfa Romeo 179	Alfa Romeo V12		ESP																
1980	Alfa Romeo 179	Alfa Romeo V12	(Italy) Vittorio Brambilla	WD																
1980	Alfa Romeo 179	Alfa Romeo V12	(France) Patrick Depailler	WD																
1980	Alfa Romeo 179	Alfa Romeo V12	(Italy) Bruno Giacomelli	WD																
