= Vittorio Brambilla =

Italian racing driver (1937–2001)

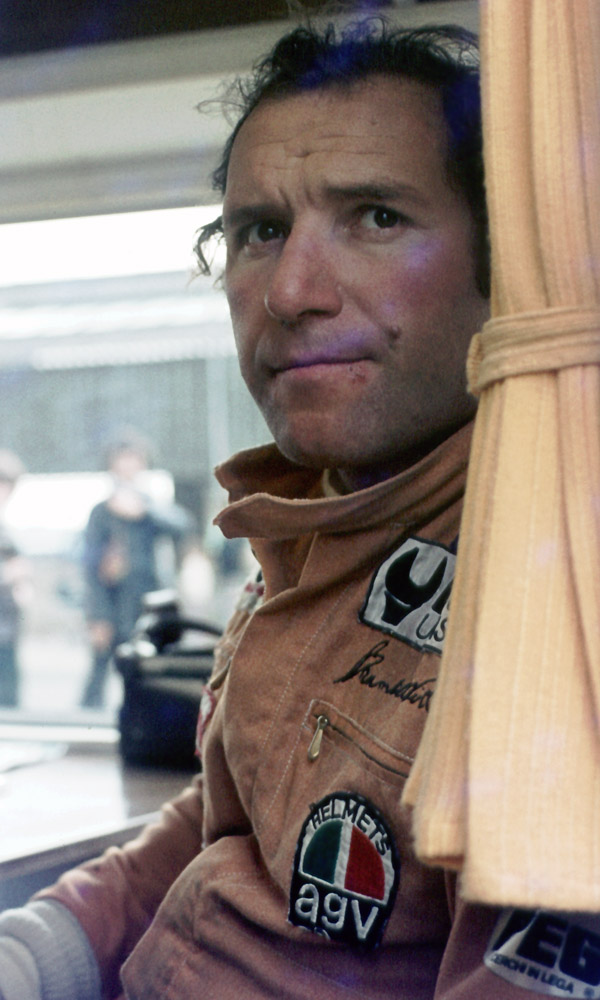
- Brambilla at the 1975 British Grand Prix
- Born: 11 November 1937; Monza, Kingdom of Italy
- Died: 26 May 2001 (aged 63); Lesmo, Italy
- Spouse: Daria Cappellin
- Children: 3
- Relatives: Ernesto Brambilla (brother)

Formula One World Championship career
- Nationality: (Italy) Italian
- Active years: 1974–1980
- Team(s): March, Surtees, Alfa Romeo
- Entries: 79 (74 starts)
- Championships: 0
- Wins: 1
- Podiums: 1
- Career points: 15.5
- Pole positions: 1
- Fastest laps: 1
- First entry: 1974 South African Grand Prix
- First win: 1975 Austrian Grand Prix
- Last entry: 1980 Italian Grand Prix

Vittorio Brambilla (Italian pronunciation: [vitˈtɔːrjo bramˈbilla]; 11 November 1937 – 26 May 2001) was an Italian racing driver, who competed in Formula One from 1974 to 1980. Nicknamed "the Monza Gorilla", (Note: Brambilla was known as The Monza Gorilla due to his aggressive driving style and machismo characteristics, as well as his birth in Monza.) Brambilla won the 1975 Austrian Grand Prix with March.

Born and raised in Monza, Brambilla competed in Formula One for March, Surtees and Alfa Romeo. A wet weather specialist, Brambilla won the curtailed Austrian Grand Prix in 1975 with a 27-second margin over James Hunt in only 29 laps.

== Career ==
Born in the town of Monza itself, Brambilla began racing motorcycles in 1957 and won the Italian national 175cc title in 1958. He continued to race motorcycles on a casual basis throughout his career, finishing 12th in a guest appearance at the 1969 Italian 500cc motorcycle Grand Prix riding a Paton. Before becoming a mechanic he also raced go-karts. His older brother, Ernesto ("Tino"), was also a racing driver.

=== Formula Three, Formula Two, Sports cars ===
Brambilla returned to racing in 1968, in Formula 3 and won the Italian championship in 1972, by which time he was already racing Formula 2. Brambilla was second to Jacky Ickx in a 1970 2-heat Formula Two race at the Salzburg Ring in Salzburg, Austria. He drove a March BMW to fourth place in Hockenheim, in a 1973 Formula Two race. There were two 10-lap heats covering 271.5 km (168.7 mi). Brambilla won the City of Enna Cup, the fifth 1973 event in the European automaker's championship for 2,000 cc cars. He averaged 195 km/h (121 mph) over 290 km (180 mi). He drove an Abarth-Osella. Brambilla captured the pole for the Monza 4-hour auto race in a BMW 3.5 CSL.

=== Formula One ===
==== March (1974–1976) ====
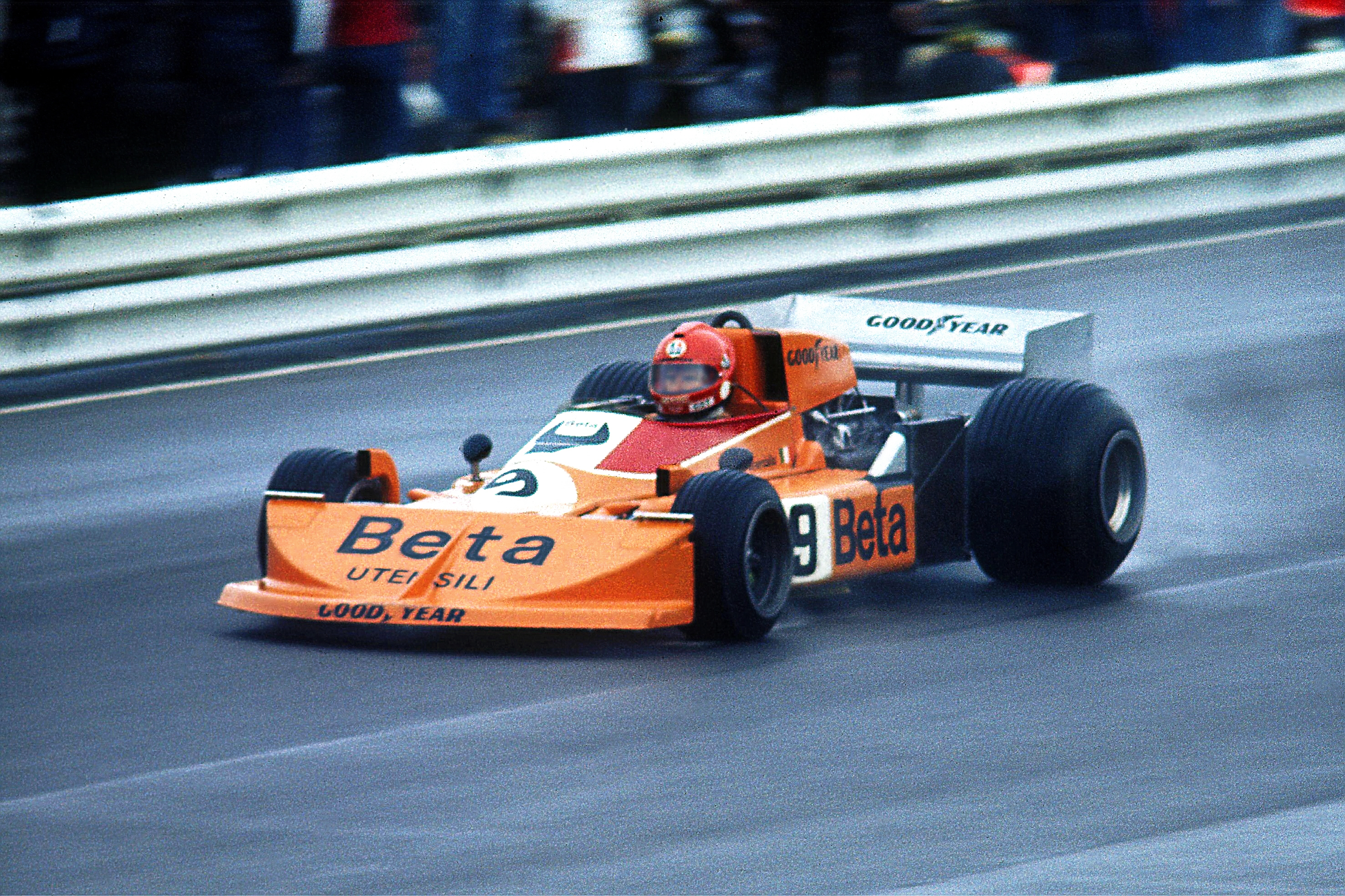
Brambilla driving a March 761 at the 1976 German Grand Prix.

In his first year of Formula One, Brambilla was as quick as his teammate Stuck, although more accident-prone. In the Swedish GP he ran in fifth until an engine problem. Brambilla finished tied for 18th, last, in the 1974 Formula One World Championship standings. In 1975 he amazed many at the Belgian GP, where he led until encountering brakes problems after 54 laps, and at the 1975 Swedish Grand Prix, where he secured pole position until a transmission failure forced him to retire after 36 laps. His great day came at the Österreichring in 1975, when he won a wet Austrian Grand Prix. He spun off and wrecked the nose of his car as he took the chequered flag, and completed his slowing down lap with the front of the car destroyed while waving to the crowd (being the first victory of an Italian driver since the 1966 Italian Grand Prix with Ludovico Scarfiotti). As the race was shortened, with 60% of it completed, he only received 4.5 points instead of 9 for the win. A more serious accident occurred that season when Brambilla crashed his March through a new curve at Watkins Glen during qualifying for the 1975 United States Grand Prix. He backed into a guard rail afterwards but was unhurt. The session ended at that point with Niki Lauda leading. Before his accident, Brambilla was second fastest with a lap of 190.24 km/h (118.21 mph). During 1976, he suffered several accidents and mechanical retirements, collecting only one point at the 1976 Dutch Grand Prix. He qualified his March in eighth position for the 1976 United States Grand Prix West. In the race, Brambilla was tapped from behind by Carlos Reutemann before they reached the first turn. He lost the right rear wheel on his March on the 35th lap of the 1976 United States Grand Prix after holding fifth place for a time.

==== Surtees (1977–1978) ====
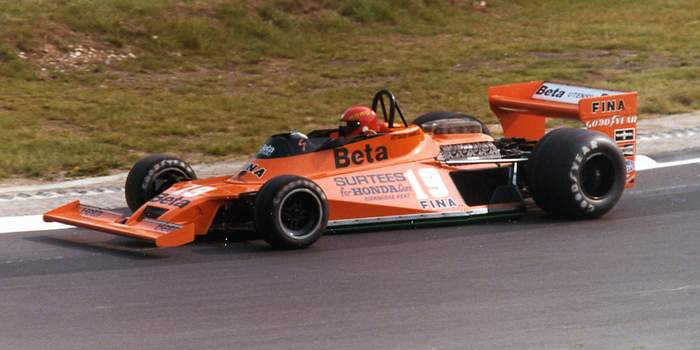
Brambilla driving for Surtees at the 1978 British Grand Prix

In 1977, Brambilla moved to the Surtees team, where he scored six points. At the same time he also drove for the Alfa Romeo sports car team, achieving the World Championship for the team. Brambilla finished eighth in the 1977 Monaco Grand Prix.

Brambilla continued with Surtees in 1978. At the 1978 United States Grand Prix West he placed 17th in qualifying, with a time of 1:23.212. His No. 19 Beta Surtees TS 19 finished 14th after experiencing engine failure on lap 50.

In a multiple pileup at Monza in the 1978 Italian Grand Prix, Brambilla suffered serious head injuries when he was hit by a flying wheel during a multiple car collision on the opening lap. In reaction to that race, in which Ronnie Peterson sustained fatal injuries, it was announced in October 1978 that the Italian Grand Prix would move to the Autodromo Dino Ferrari circuit in Imola for the next three years although this did not actually happen until 1980. The 1979 Italian Grand Prix was at Monza again, and Brambilla recovered and returned to participate in that race.

==== Alfa Romeo (1979–1980) ====
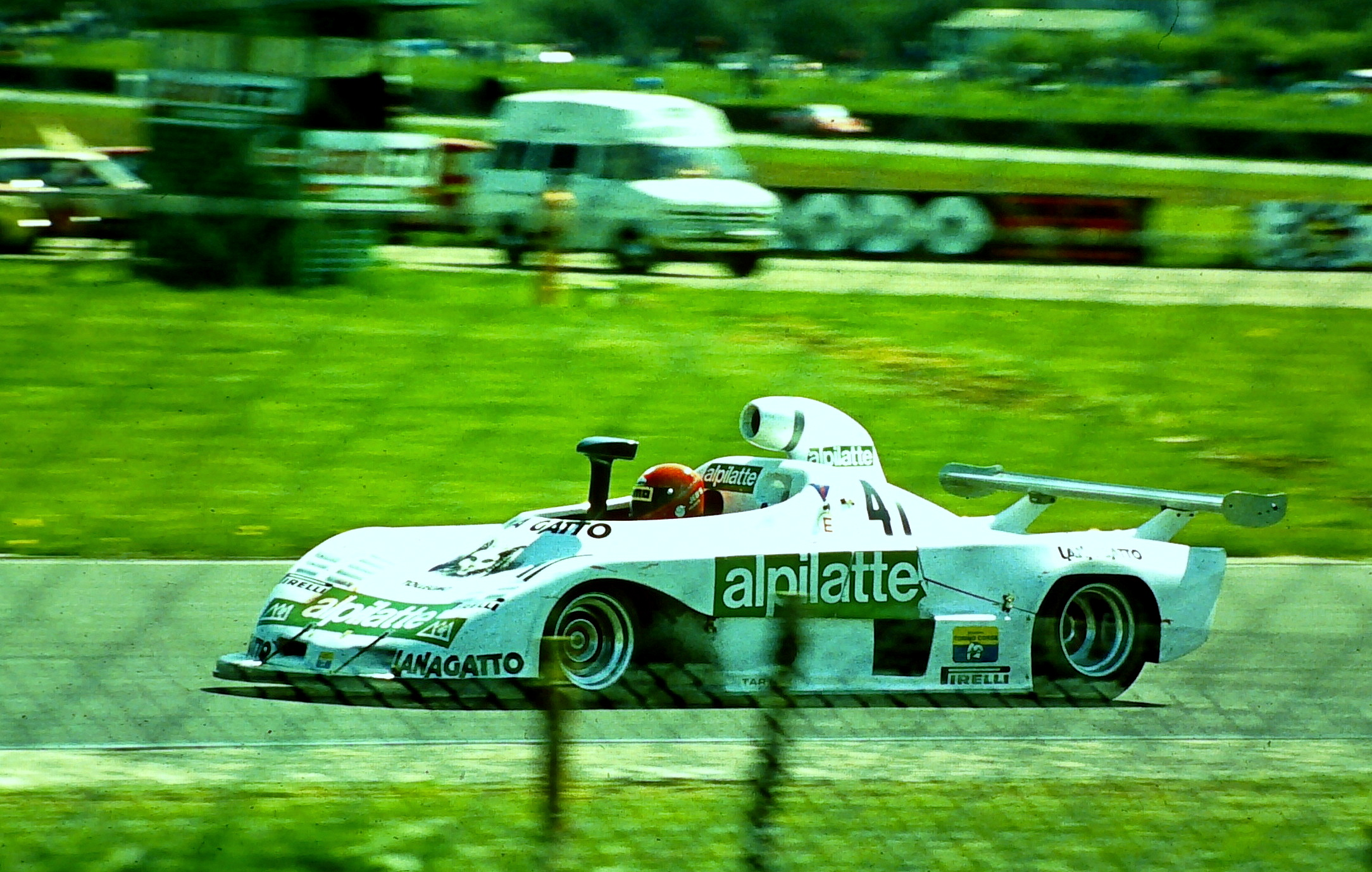
Brambilla competing at the 1980 Silverstone 6 Hours in an Osella PA8

Brambilla drove briefly for the Alfa Romeo Formula One team in 1979 and 1980. On the first day of qualifying for the 1979 United States Grand Prix, Brambilla was timed at 134.98 km/h (83.87 mph). Heavy rain caused a slick track and slower times. In December 1979, Alfa Romeo revealed its Formula One race car for the 1980 season. The company named Patrick Depailler, Brambilla, and Bruno Giacomelli as its drivers. The racer was nearly identical to one driven by Giacomelli in the 1979 Italian Grand Prix. It was a wing car design with a V-12 engine that generated more than 520 hp (388 kW). Alfa Romeo announced that it was working on a 1,500 cubic centimeter turbocharged engine which was to begin track testing in a Formula One car in the summer of 1980.

== Retirement and death ==
Brambilla retired at the end of the 1980 season. In the early 1990s, he opened a Formula One memorabilia shop in Milan, occasionally driving the safety car during the Italian Grand Prix. He died at Lesmo, near Milan, of a heart attack at the age of 63 while gardening at his home. He reportedly collapsed while mowing the lawn.

== Racing record ==
=== Complete European Formula Two Championship results ===
(key) (Races in bold indicate pole position; races in italics indicate fastest lap)

Year	Entrant	Chassis	Engine	1	2	3	4	5	6	7	8	9	10	11	12	13	14	15	16	17	Pos.	Pts
1970	Scuderia Picchio Rossa	Brabham BT23	Ford	THR; DNS	HOC	BAR; 10	ROU														13th	3
1970	North Italian Racing Developments	Brabham BT30	Ford					PER; Ret													13th	3
1970	North Italian Racing Developments	Brabham BT23	Ford						TUL; 6												13th	3
1970	Scuderia Ala d'Oro	Brabham BT30	Ford							IMO; Ret	HOC; 8										13th	3
1971	Scuderia Ala d'Oro	Brabham BT30	Ford	HOC; Ret	THR; Ret	NÜR; Ret	JAR	PAL													18th	2
1971	Scuderia Ala d'Oro	March 712M	Ford						ROU; DNQ	MAN	TUL	ALB	VLL								18th	2
1971	Vittorio Brambilla	March 712M	Ford											VLL; 5							18th	2
1972	Vittorio Brambilla	March 712M	BMW	MAL	THR	HOC	PAU	PAL	HOC	ROU	ÖST; 9	IMO; Ret	MAN	PER	SAL	ALB	HOC				NC	0
1973	Beta Racing Team	March 712M	BMW	MAL; 6																	4th	35
1973	Beta Racing Team	March 732	BMW		HOC; 11	THR; 7	NÜR; 5	PAU; Ret	KIN	NIV; 3	HOC; 4	ROU	MNZ; Ret	MAN	KAR	PER; 2	SAL; 1	NOR	**ALB**; 1	**VLL**; 2	4th	35
1974	Brian Lewis Racing	March 732	BMW	BAR	HOC	PAU	SAL	HOC	MUG	KAR	PER	HOC	VLL; 12								NC	0
1975	Project 3 Racing	March 752	BMW	EST	THR; NC	HOC; Ret	NÜR	PAU	HOC	SAL; 12	ROU	MUG; Ret	PER; Ret	SIL	ZOL	NOG	VLL; 1				13th	9
1976	Project Four Racing	March 762	Lancia	HOC	THR	VLL; Ret	SAL	PAU	HOC	ROU	MUG										NC	0
1976	Vittorio Brambilla	March 732	Ferrari									PER; DNQ	EST	NOG	HOC						NC	0
1977	Willi Kauhsen Racing Team	Elf 2J	Renault	SIL	THR	HOC	NÜR	VLL	PAU	MUG	ROU	NOG	PER	MIS; Ret	EST	DON					NC	0

=== Complete Formula One results ===
(key) (Races in bold indicate pole position; races in italics indicate fastest lap)

Year	Entrant	Chassis	Engine	1	2	3	4	5	6	7	8	9	10	11	12	13	14	15	16	17	WDC	Pts
1974	Beta Utensili	March 741	Ford Cosworth DFV 3.0 V8	ARG	BRA	RSA; 10	ESP; DNS	BEL; 9	MON; Ret	SWE; 10	NED; 10	FRA; 11	GBR; Ret	GER; 13	AUT; 6	ITA; Ret	CAN; DNQ	USA; Ret			18th	1
1975	Beta Team March	March 741	Ford Cosworth DFV 3.0 V8	ARG; 9	BRA; Ret																11th	6.5
1975	Beta Team March	March 751	Ford Cosworth DFV 3.0 V8			RSA; Ret	ESP; 5^{‡}	MON; Ret	BEL; Ret	**SWE**; Ret	NED; Ret	FRA; Ret	GBR; 6	GER; Ret	AUT; 1^{‡}	ITA; Ret	USA; 7				11th	6.5
1976	Beta Team March	March 761	Ford Cosworth DFV 3.0 V8	BRA; Ret	RSA; 8	USW; Ret	ESP; Ret	BEL; Ret	MON; Ret	SWE; 10	FRA; Ret	GBR; Ret	GER; Ret	AUT; Ret	NED; 6	ITA; 7	CAN; 14	USA; Ret	JPN; Ret		19th	1
1977	Beta Team Surtees	Surtees TS19	Ford Cosworth DFV 3.0 V8	ARG; 7	BRA; Ret	RSA; 7	USW; Ret	ESP; Ret	MON; 8	BEL; 4	SWE; Ret	FRA; 13	GBR; 8	GER; 5	AUT; 15	NED; 12	ITA; Ret	USA; 19	CAN; 6	JPN; 8	16th	6
1978	Beta Team Surtees	Surtees TS19	Ford Cosworth DFV 3.0 V8	ARG; 18	BRA; DNQ	RSA; 12	USW; Ret														19th	1
1978	Beta Team Surtees	Surtees TS20	Ford Cosworth DFV 3.0 V8					MON; DNQ	BEL; 13	ESP; 7	SWE; Ret	FRA; 17	GBR; 9	GER; Ret	AUT; 6	NED; DSQ	ITA; Ret	USA	CAN		19th	1
1979	Autodelta	Alfa Romeo 177	Alfa Romeo 115-12 3.0 F12	ARG	BRA	RSA	USW	ESP	BEL	MON	FRA	GBR	GER	AUT	NED	ITA; 12					NC	0
1979	Autodelta	Alfa Romeo 179	Alfa Romeo 1260 3.0 V12														CAN; Ret	USA; DNQ			NC	0
1980	Marlboro Team Alfa Romeo	Alfa Romeo 179	Alfa Romeo 1260 3.0 V12	ARG	BRA	RSA	USW	BEL	MON	FRA	GBR	GER	AUT	NED; Ret	ITA; Ret	CAN	USA				NC	0

^{‡} Half points awarded as less than 75% of race distance completed.

== See also ==
- Formula One drivers from Italy

Sporting positions
Preceded by Giancarlo Naddeo	Italian Formula Three Champion; 1972	Succeeded by Carlo Giorgio
