= Alfa Romeo 12-cylinder engine =

Overview
- Manufacturer: (Italy) Alfa Romeo
- Production: 1973–1982

Layout
- Configuration: 60°–180° V-12/flat-12
- Displacement: 2,134 cc (2.134 L); 2,995 cc (2.995 L); 2,991 cc (2.991 L)
- Cylinder bore: 77 mm (3.0 in); 78.5 mm (3.1 in)
- Piston stroke: 38.2 mm (1.5 in); 53.6 mm (2.1 in); 51.5 mm (2.0 in)
- Valvetrain: 48-valve (four-valves per cylinder), DOHC
- Compression ratio: 11.0:1–12.0:1

Combustion
- Turbocharger: KKK Twin-turbocharged (Sports cars); Naturally aspirated (Formula 1 cars)
- Fuel system: Mechanical fuel injection (Sports cars); Electronic fuel injection (Formula 1 cars)
- Fuel type: Gasoline
- Cooling system: Water-cooled

Output
- Power output: 520–640 hp (388–477 kW; 527–649 PS)
- Torque output: 227–347 lb⋅ft (308–470 N⋅m)

Dimensions
- Length: (V12); 1,790 mm (70 in) (Flat 12); 895 mm (35.2 in)
- Width: (V12); 665 mm (26.2 in) (Flat 12); 1,000 mm (39 in)
- Height: (V12); 465 mm (18.3 in) (Flat 12); 225 mm (8.9 in)
- Dry weight: 143–175 kg (315.3–385.8 lb)

Chronology
- Predecessor: Tipo 33 engine
- Successor: 890T

Alfa Romeo made a series of 2.1-litre to 3.0-litre, naturally-aspirated and turbocharged, V-12 and flat-12, Grand Prix and Sports car racing engines designed for Formula One, the World Sportscar Championship, Can-Am, the Nordic Challenge Cup, and Interserie; starting in 1973, with their Alfa Romeo 33TT12 Group 5 sports car. This was followed by the twin-turbocharged Alfa Romeo 33SC12 Group 6 engine in 1976, and shortly after, Brabham as an engine supplier in 1976; before entering Formula One themselves in 1979. Their first was a Carlo Chiti-designed Alfa Romeo flat-12 engine (essentially a 180° V-12) which had been used earlier in the Alfa Romeo 33TT12 and 33SC12 sports cars. In 1976 this engine was supplied to Brabham and the deal continued until 1979. The engine was dubbed the 115-12, and was a 180° V12 engine; essentially making it a flat-12 engine. Their second 12-cylinder engine, dubbed the 1260, debuted at the 1979 Italian Grand Prix. This time, the engine configuration was a conventional 60° V-12, rather than a flat layout.

== Applications ==
=== Formula 1 cars ===
- Brabham BT45
- Brabham BT46
- Brabham BT48
- Alfa Romeo 177
- Alfa Romeo 179
- Alfa Romeo 182
- Osella FA1E

=== Sports cars ===
- Alfa Romeo Tipo 33
