= Alfa Romeo 179 =

Alfa Romeo 179 Alfa Romeo 179B Alfa Romeo 179C Alfa Romeo 179D
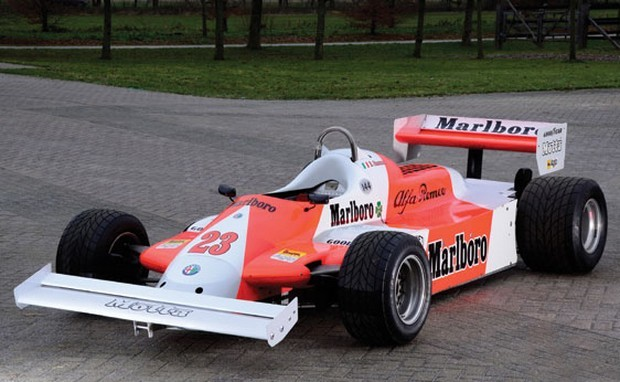
- The 179D in Marlboro livery
- Category: Formula One
- Constructor: Alfa Romeo
- Designers: Carlo Chiti (Technical Director); Robert Choulet (Chief Designer)
- Predecessor: 177
- Successor: 182

Technical specifications
- Chassis: Aluminium monocoque Carbon-fibre monocoque
- Suspension (front): Lower wishbones, top rockers, inboard shocks
- Suspension (rear): Lower wishbones, parallel top links, inboard shocks
- Engine: Alfa Romeo 1260 2,995 cc (182.8 cu in) 60° V12 naturally aspirated, mid-engined, longitudinally mounted
- Transmission: Alfa/Hewland 5 or 6 speed manual
- Fuel: Agip
- Tyres: 1979-80: Goodyear; 1981-82: Michelin

Competition history
- Notable entrants: Autodelta (1979, 4 races); Marlboro Team Alfa Romeo (1980–1982)
- Notable drivers: (Italy) Bruno Giacomelli (Italy) Vittorio Brambilla (Italy) Andrea de Cesaris (France) Patrick Depailler (United States) Mario Andretti
- Debut: 1979 Italian Grand Prix
Races	Wins	Poles	F/Laps
63	0	1	0
- Constructors' Championships: 0
- Drivers' Championships: 0
- Unless otherwise stated, all data refer to Formula One World Championship Grands Prix only.

The Alfa Romeo 179 is a Formula One car which was used (in different variants) by the Alfa Romeo team from 1979 to 1982. The 179 made its debut at the 1979 Italian Grand Prix, replacing the flat-12 engined Alfa Romeo 177. During its lifespan there were many versions and 179D version was used for the last time at the 1982 South African Grand Prix.

== History ==
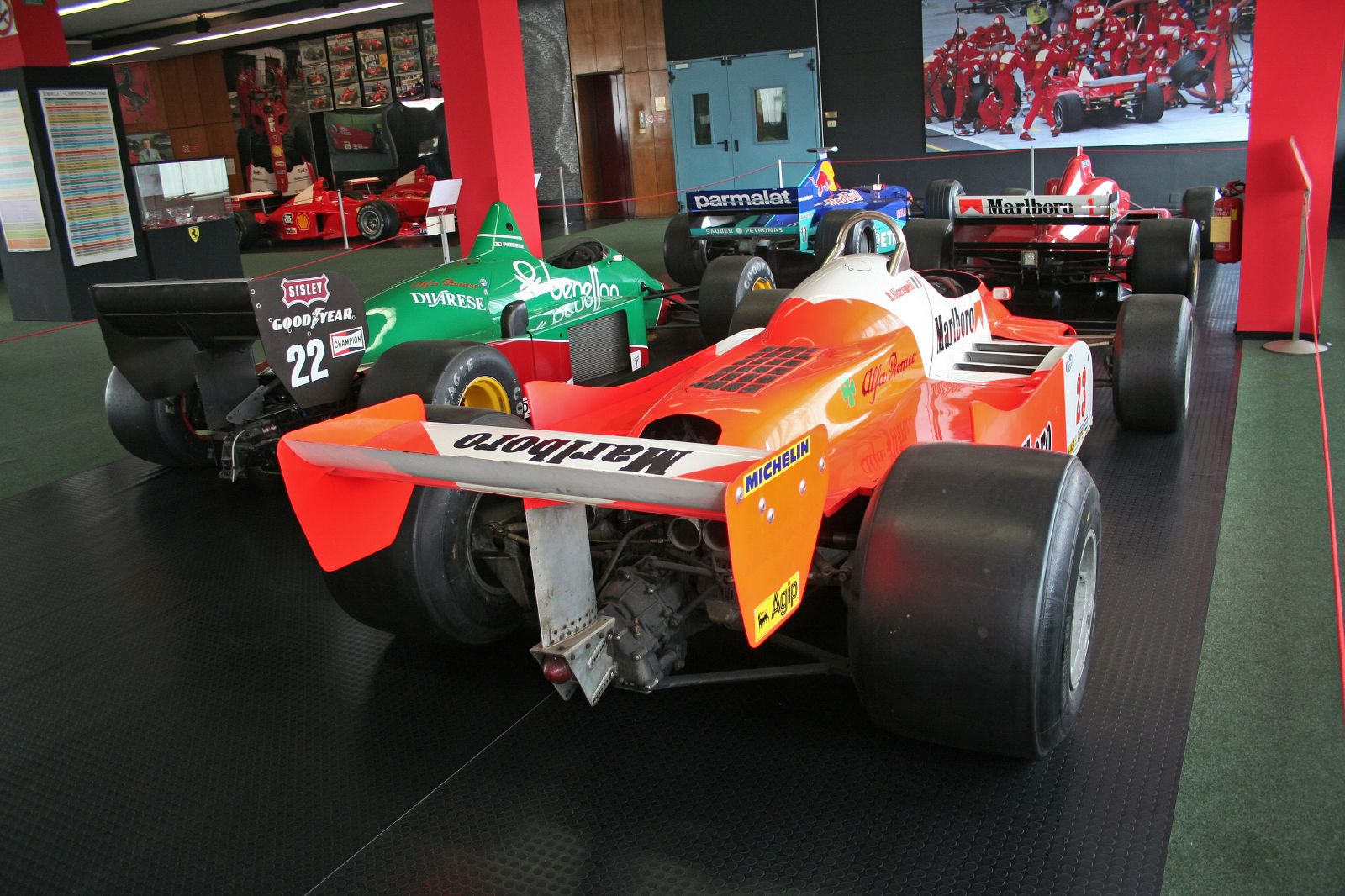
Rear view of 179B (1981) in Turin Automobile Museum.

Alfa Romeo hired Frenchman Patrick Depailler for the 1980 season; Depailler had a good reputation as a testing and development driver, and this proved invaluable for the 179's competitiveness. The car was far from competitive at the first races of the season in Argentina and Brazil; Depailler and his teammate Bruno Giacomelli qualified at the back of the grid for both races even though the former finished 5th in Argentina. But a month later in South Africa the car had become far better and Depailler qualified 6th on the grid, and another 4 weeks later at Long Beach the Alfa had improved even further and Depailler qualified the car an amazing 3rd on the grid, whilst Giacomelli qualified 6th. Although Alfa Romeo did not win a race that season largely due to horrendous unreliability, they were often up there with the front runners, although the team's season was marred by the death of Depailler at a testing session at Hockenheim in Germany when he crashed due to a suspension failure which pitched his car into the Armco barrier at the high-speed Ostkurve, inflicting fatal head injuries as the vehicle overturned and skidded along the top of the guard rail for several hundred feet prior to flipping onto its top and into the trees. Giacomelli bravely raced at Hockenheim a week later, finishing 5th. But the team ended the season on a positive note, with Depallier's testing not having gone in vain when Giacomelli stuck his Alfa on pole at the last race of the season at Watkins Glen; he led most of the race until electrical failure put him out of the race.

The 179's best achievements were Bruno Giacomelli's pole position at the 1980 United States Grand Prix at Watkins Glen and 3rd place at the 1981 Caesars Palace Grand Prix. The car scored 14 points from 61 races.

== Variants ==
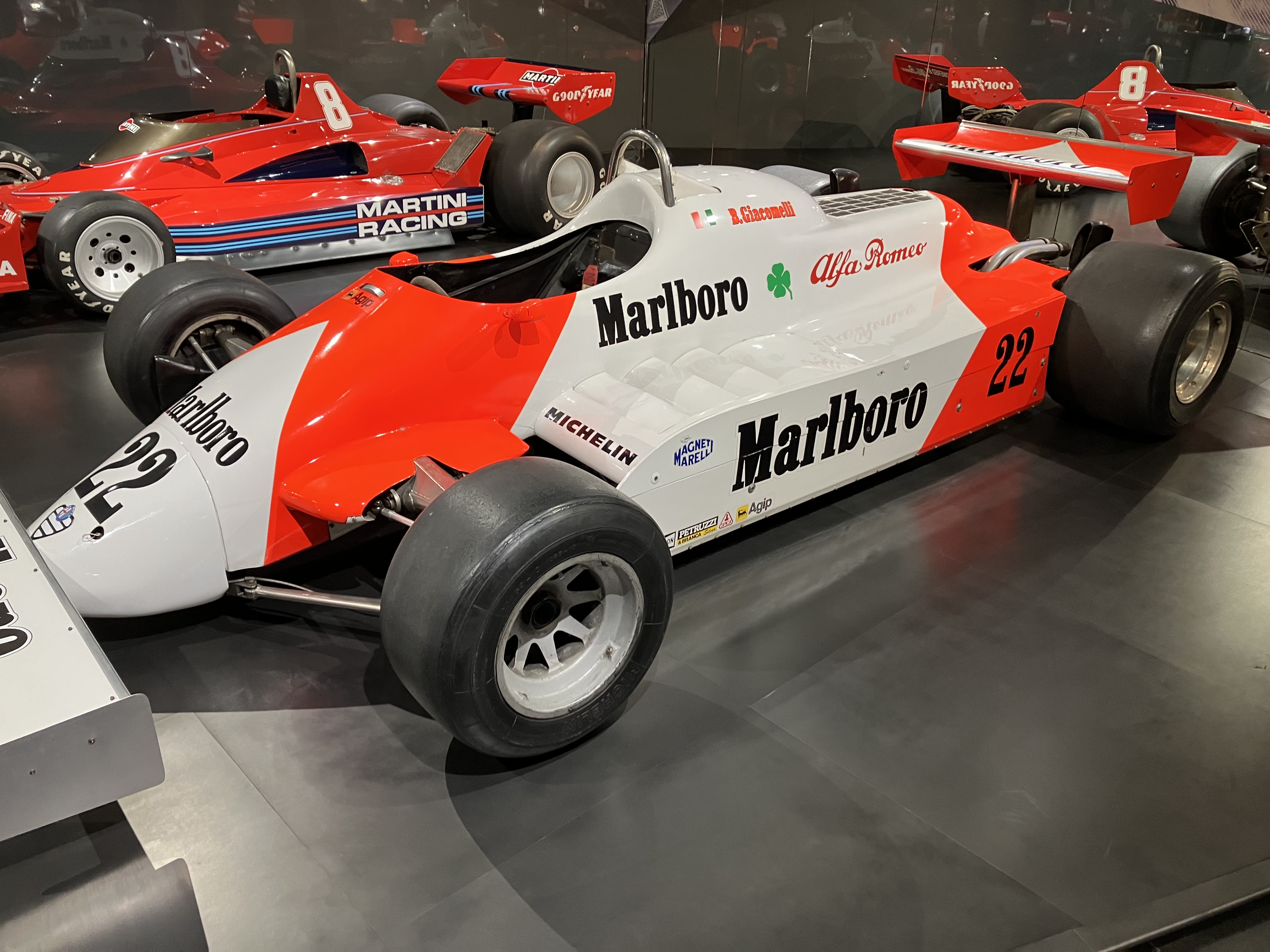
179F Test Car at the Alfa Romeo Museum

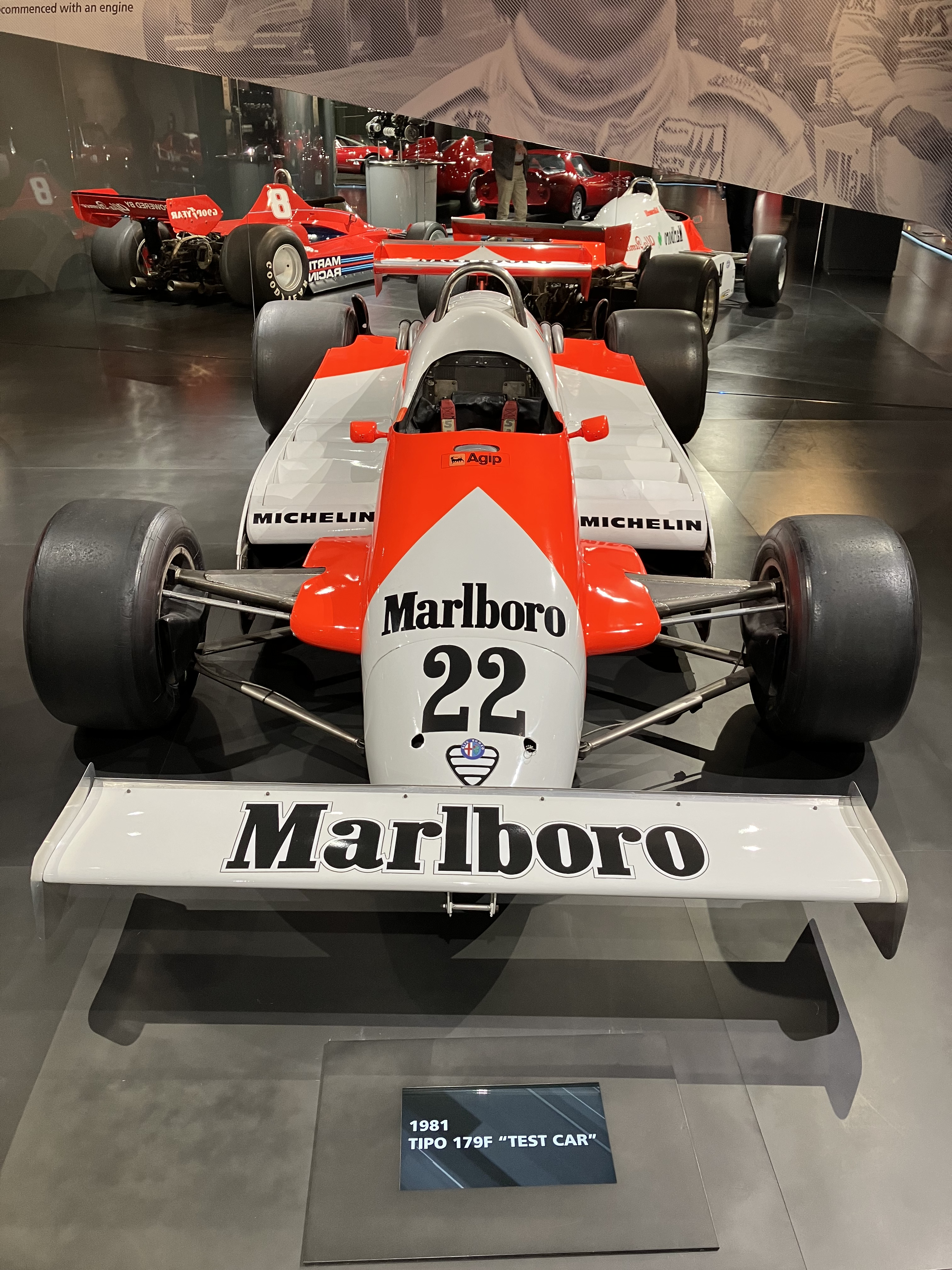
Front of the 179F Test Car

At the beginning of the 1981 season, the 179s were fitted with adjustable dampers and denoted as 179C. A lower 179D was the next evolution and the final version which raced. A fully carbon-fibre 179F was present at the 1982 South African Grand Prix but was never raced.

There was also a V8-engined test mule of this car, the 179T in 1982, which was used to test the new 1.5 L turbocharged engine.

== Technical information ==
	Alfa Romeo 179
Engine	Tipo-1260-60°-V12 (block and heads light alloy) 175 kg
Displacement	2995 cm^{3} / 182.5 cu in
bore × stroke	77 mm × 53.6 mm
Compression ratio	11.0 : 1
max. Torque:	333 Nm at 9500 rpm
max. power	392 kW (525 hp) at 12,300 rpm
HP per litre of displacement:	176 HP
Valve control	two overhead camshafts, 4 valves per cylinder
Mixture preparation	Lucas Intake manifold injection
Cooling	Water
Gearbox	6-speed gearbox (rear-wheel drive)
Brakes	ventilated disc brakes on all wheels
Front suspension	double wishbones, the inwardly extended upper links actuate the inner spring-damper units, stabilizer
Rear suspension	double wishbones, the inwardly extended upper links actuate the inner spring-damper units, stabilizer
Body and frame	Chassis: Monocoque in sandwich construction with cover layers made of carbon fibre reinforced plastic and honeycomb core; engine as a load-bearing part
Wheelbase	2780 mm
Track width front / rear	1720 mm / 1610 mm
Tire size front	unknown
Tire size rear	unknown
Dimensions L × W × H	4300 mm × 2140 mm × 900 mm
Empty weight (without driver)	595 kg
Tank capacity	unknown
Fuel consumption	unknown
Top speed	depending on the gear ratio
Power to weight ratio (hp/kg)	0.88 HP/kg

== Non-Championship races ==
Following the 1980 season, Alfa entered one of their 179s, with Giacomelli doing the driving, in the non-championship 1980 Australian Grand Prix at the Calder Park Raceway in Melbourne. The race that year was open to Formula One, Formula 5000 and Formula Pacific cars with the Alfa, along with the Williams-Ford of 1980 World Champion, Australian Alan Jones, being the only F1 cars in the race. Calder circuit owner and race promoter Bob Jane invited the factory Alfa team in the hopes of attracting spectators from Melbourne's large Italian community (a ploy that, along with the presence of Jones, saw a good, but far from capacity crowd on race day). Giacomelli qualified second behind Jones (and easily faster than the F5000 cars) and after showing surprising speed and taking the lead from Jones part-way through the race, eventually finished a lap behind the Williams in second place.

Variants:

Model	Number of Grands Prix	Seasons	Debut	Last race
Alfa Romeo 179	30	1979–1980	1979 Italian GP	1980 United States GP
Alfa Romeo 179B	2	1981	1981 Austrian GP	1981 Dutch GP
Alfa Romeo 179C	24	1981	1981 US West GP	1981 Caesars Palace GP
Alfa Romeo 179D	6	1981–1982	1981 Austrian GP	1982 South African GP

== Complete Formula One results ==
(key) (results in bold indicate pole position)

Year	Entrant	Chassis	Engine	Tyres	Drivers	1	2	3	4	5	6	7	8	9	10	11	12	13	14	15	16	Points	WCC
1979	Autodelta	179	Alfa Romeo 1260 V12	G		ARG	BRA	RSA	USW	ESP	BEL	MON	FRA	GBR	GER	AUT	NED	ITA	CAN	USA		0	13th
1979	Autodelta	179	Alfa Romeo 1260 V12	G	Bruno Giacomelli													Ret	DNA	Ret		0	13th
1979	Autodelta	179	Alfa Romeo 1260 V12	G	Vittorio Brambilla														Ret	DNQ		0	13th
1980	Marlboro Team Alfa Romeo	179	Alfa Romeo 1260 V12	G		ARG	BRA	RSA	USW	BEL	MON	FRA	GBR	GER	AUT	NED	ITA	CAN	USA			4	11th
1980	Marlboro Team Alfa Romeo	179	Alfa Romeo 1260 V12	G	Bruno Giacomelli	5	13	Ret	Ret	Ret	Ret	Ret	Ret	5	Ret	Ret	Ret	Ret	**Ret**			4	11th
1980	Marlboro Team Alfa Romeo	179	Alfa Romeo 1260 V12	G	Patrick Depailler	Ret	Ret	NC	Ret	Ret	Ret	Ret	Ret									4	11th
1980	Marlboro Team Alfa Romeo	179	Alfa Romeo 1260 V12	G	Vittorio Brambilla										DNA	Ret	Ret					4	11th
1980	Marlboro Team Alfa Romeo	179	Alfa Romeo 1260 V12	G	Andrea de Cesaris													Ret	Ret			4	11th
1981	Marlboro Team Alfa Romeo	179B; 179C; 179D	Alfa Romeo 1260 V12	MI		USW	BRA	ARG	SMR	BEL	MON	ESP	FRA	GBR	GER	AUT	NED	ITA	CAN	CPL		10	9th
1981	Marlboro Team Alfa Romeo	179B; 179C; 179D	Alfa Romeo 1260 V12	MI	Mario Andretti	4	Ret	8	Ret	10	Ret	8	8	Ret	9	Ret	Ret	Ret	7	Ret		10	9th
1981	Marlboro Team Alfa Romeo	179B; 179C; 179D	Alfa Romeo 1260 V12	MI	Bruno Giacomelli	Ret	NC	10	Ret	9	Ret	10	15	Ret	15	Ret	Ret	8	4	3		10	9th
1982	Marlboro Team Alfa Romeo	179D	Alfa Romeo 1260 V12	MI		RSA	BRA	USW	SMR	BEL	MON	DET	CAN	NED	GBR	FRA	GER	AUT	SUI	ITA	CPL	7	10th
1982	Marlboro Team Alfa Romeo	179D	Alfa Romeo 1260 V12	MI	Andrea de Cesaris	13																7	10th
1982	Marlboro Team Alfa Romeo	179D	Alfa Romeo 1260 V12	MI	Bruno Giacomelli	11																7	10th
