= Johnny Mauro =

American racecar driver

- Born: October 25, 1910; Denver, Colorado, U.S.
- Died: January 23, 2003 (aged 92)

Formula One World Championship career
- Nationality: (United States) American
- Active years: 1950, 1952
- Team(s): Alfa Romeo, Ferrari
- Entries: 2 (0 starts)
- Championships: 0
- Wins: 0
- Podiums: 0
- Career points: 0
- Pole positions: 0
- Fastest laps: 0
- First entry: 1950 Indianapolis 500
- Last entry: 1952 Indianapolis 500

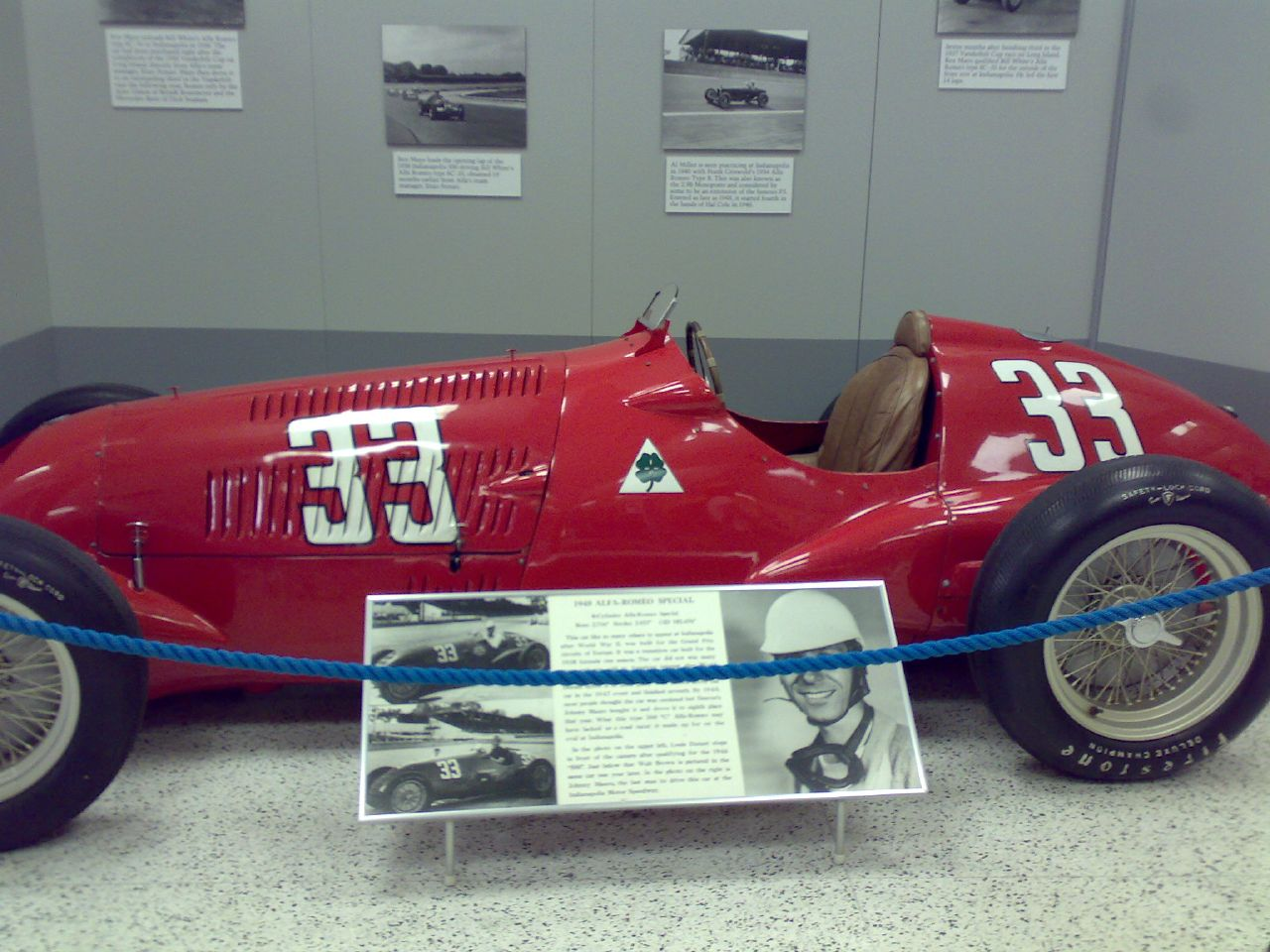
Johnny Mauro's Alfa Romeo 308 at the Indianapolis Motor Speedway Hall of Fame Museum.

Johnny Mauro (October 25, 1910 – January 23, 2003) was an American racecar driver. He was born in Denver Colorado on October 25, 1910. Mauro and his family owned several car dealerships, leading him to being the only Ferrari importer in Denver for many years. He raced in Indy cars for Ferrari in the 1940s and 1950s, and was the mastermind behind the United States Truck Driving School (USTDS), a company still owned by his daughter Arlene and her husband Dick Lammers. When Mauro died in January 2003 in an auto accident, he owned a large collection of cars he had acquired, all of them restored, including a Ford Model A, an Alfa Romeo, a Fiat, a few Mercedes, a quarter midget race car, a Buick, and his prized possession, a red 1984 Ferrari GTO with only a few thousand original miles.

== Racing record ==
=== Indy 500 results ===
Year	Car	Start	Qual	Rank	Finish	Laps	Led	Retired
1948	33	27	121.790	33	8	198	0	Flagged
Totals						198	0	

Starts	1
Poles	0
Front Row	0
Wins	0
Top 5	0
Top 10	1
Retired	0

=== Complete Formula One World Championship results ===
(key)

Year	Entrant	Chassis	Engine	1	2	3	4	5	6	7	8	WDC	Pts
1950	Johnny Mauro	Alfa Romeo 8C-308	Alfa Romeo 3.0 L8s	GBR	MON	500; DNQ	SUI	BEL	FRA	ITA		NC	0
1952	Kennedy Tank	Ferrari 375S	Ferrari 375 4.5 V12	SUI	500; DNQ	BEL	FRA	GBR	GER	NED	ITA	NC	0
