= 1979 Italian Grand Prix =

- Race 13 of 15 in the 1979 Formula One season
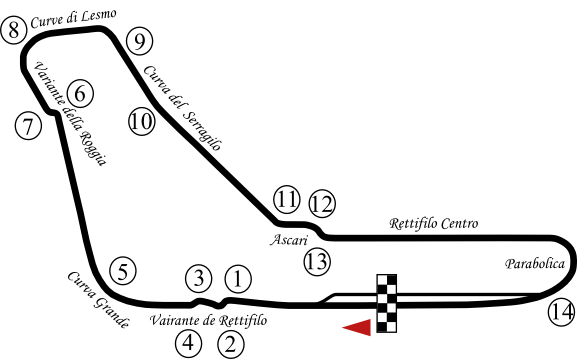

Race details
- Date: 9 September 1979
- Official name: 50º Gran Premio d'Italia
- Location: Autodromo Nazionale di Monza, Monza
- Course: Permanent racing facility
- Course length: 5.800 km (3.60 miles)
- Distance: 50 laps, 290.000 km (180.20 miles)
- Weather: Dry and sunny

Pole position
Driver	(France) Jean-Pierre Jabouille	Renault
- Time: 1:34.580

Fastest lap
Driver	(Switzerland) Clay Regazzoni	Williams-Ford
- Time: 1:35.60 on lap 46

Podium
First	(South Africa) Jody Scheckter	Ferrari
Second	(Canada) Gilles Villeneuve	Ferrari
Third	(Switzerland) Clay Regazzoni	Williams-Ford

The 1979 Italian Grand Prix was a Formula One motor race held on 9 September 1979 at Monza. It was the thirteenth race of the 1979 World Championship of F1 Drivers and the 1979 International Cup for F1 Constructors.

The 50-lap race was won by South African Jody Scheckter, driving a Ferrari, with Canadian team-mate Gilles Villeneuve second and Swiss Clay Regazzoni third in a Williams-Ford. Scheckter claimed the Drivers' Championship in the process and became the first and only South African thus far to win the championship, while Ferrari clinched the Constructors' Championship. The race also marked Scheckter's final race win and podium; he retired after the following season. As of 2026, this is the last Grand Prix to be won by a driver from the continent of Africa. Two days after the race, Scheckter signed a one-year contract for Ferrari until 1980.

This race marked Scuderia Ferrari's 300th start in a World Championship event as a team.

== Report ==
=== Background ===
Monza was revamped for 1979, with the track re-surfaced and run-off areas added to the Curva Grande and the Lesmo curves.

The entry list was enlarged by the return of the Alfa Romeo team, which had participated in the Belgian and French Grands Prix earlier in the season. Alfa Romeo fielded two cars: a new 179 chassis for Bruno Giacomelli, and the old 177 for Vittorio Brambilla, back in action for the first time since the crash in the previous year's race at Monza that had claimed the life of Ronnie Peterson. Meanwhile, Mexican Héctor Rebaque had his HR100 chassis ready for the first time, while Switzerland's Marc Surer, having won the Formula Two championship the previous month, made his first Formula One appearance as Ensign took him on in place of Patrick Gaillard.

=== Qualifying ===
The turbo-powered Renaults were quick in qualifying and filled the front row of the grid, with Jean-Pierre Jabouille ahead of René Arnoux. It was Jabouille's fourth pole position of the season, and Renault's sixth. Scheckter and Alan Jones in the Williams made up the second row, while on the third were their respective teammates, Gilles Villeneuve and Clay Regazzoni. The top ten was completed by Jacques Laffite in the Ligier, the Brabhams of Nelson Piquet and Niki Lauda, and Mario Andretti in the Lotus.

=== Race ===
The Renaults were slow off the start line and so Scheckter took the lead, with Arnoux holding on to second. Jones also made a poor start and dropped to the back of the field, putting Villeneuve third and the fast-starting Laffite fourth. On lap 2, Arnoux passed Scheckter for the lead, while Piquet crashed out after tangling with Regazzoni. Regazzoni was slow out of Curva Grande and Piquet took an outside line to keep his speed. Regazzoni moved across, possibly unaware Piquet was there, and sent the Brazilian heavily into the barriers, with the Brabham ending in two halves either side of the track. Fortunately Piquet was unhurt, and Regazzoni continued in the race.

For the next eleven laps Arnoux, Scheckter, Villeneuve, Laffite and Jabouille ran nose-to-tail, with Regazzoni a distant sixth. Then, on lap 13, Arnoux's engine began to misfire, leading to his retirement. Scheckter thus regained the lead, with Villeneuve dutifully following him. Later in the race, Laffite and Jabouille also suffered engine failures, promoting Regazzoni to third.

Scheckter eventually took the chequered flag half a second ahead of Villeneuve and, with it, the Drivers' Championship. This one-two finish for Ferrari in their home race also secured them the Constructors' Championship. Regazzoni finished four seconds behind Villeneuve and 50 ahead of Lauda, with the final points going to Andretti and Jean-Pierre Jarier in the Tyrrell.

== Qualifying ==
=== Qualifying classification ===
Pos.	Driver	Constructor	Time	No
1	Jean-Pierre Jabouille	Renault	1:34.580	1
2	René Arnoux	Renault	1:34.704	2
3	Jody Scheckter	Ferrari	1:34.830	3
4	Alan Jones	Williams-Ford	1:34.914	4
5	Gilles Villeneuve	Ferrari	1:34.989	5
6	Clay Regazzoni	Williams-Ford	1:35.333	6
7	Jacques Laffite	Ligier-Ford	1:35.443	7
8	Nelson Piquet	Brabham-Alfa Romeo	1:35.587	8
9	Niki Lauda	Brabham-Alfa Romeo	1:36.219	9
10	Mario Andretti	Lotus-Ford	1:36.655	10
11	Jacky Ickx	Ligier-Ford	1:37.114	11
12	Didier Pironi	Tyrrell-Ford	1:37.181	12
13	Carlos Reutemann	Lotus-Ford	1:37.202	13
14	Patrick Tambay	McLaren-Ford	1:37.231	14
15	Hans-Joachim Stuck	ATS-Ford	1:37.297	15
16	Jean-Pierre Jarier	Tyrrell-Ford	1:37.581	16
17	Riccardo Patrese	Arrows-Ford	1:37.674	17
18	Bruno Giacomelli	Alfa Romeo	1:38.053	18
19	John Watson	McLaren-Ford	1:38.093	19
20	Emerson Fittipaldi	Fittipaldi-Ford	1:38.136	20
21	Jochen Mass	Arrows-Ford	1:38.163	21
22	Vittorio Brambilla	Alfa Romeo	1:38.601	22
23	Keke Rosberg	Wolf-Ford	1:38.854	23
24	Elio de Angelis	Shadow-Ford	1:39.149	24
DNQ	Jan Lammers	Shadow-Ford	1:39.313	—
DNQ	Marc Surer	Ensign-Ford	1:40.821	—
DNQ	Arturo Merzario	Merzario-Ford	1:42.002	—
DNQ	Héctor Rebaque	Rebaque-Ford	1:42.769	—

== Race ==
=== Classification ===
Pos	No	Driver	Constructor	Tyre	Laps	Time/Retired	Grid	Points
1	11	(South Africa) Jody Scheckter	Ferrari	M	50	1:22:00.22	3	9
2	12	(Canada) Gilles Villeneuve	Ferrari	M	50	+ 0.46	5	6
3	28	(Switzerland) Clay Regazzoni	Williams-Ford	G	50	+ 4.78	6	4
4	5	(Austria) Niki Lauda	Brabham-Alfa Romeo	G	50	+ 54.40	9	3
5	1	(United States) Mario Andretti	Lotus-Ford	G	50	+ 59.70	10	2
6	4	(France) Jean-Pierre Jarier	Tyrrell-Ford	G	50	+ 1:01.55	16	1
7	2	(Argentina) Carlos Reutemann	Lotus-Ford	G	50	+ 1:24.14	13	
8	14	(Brazil) Emerson Fittipaldi	Fittipaldi-Ford	G	49	+ 1 Lap	20	
9	27	(Australia) Alan Jones	Williams-Ford	G	49	+ 1 Lap	4	
10	3	(France) Didier Pironi	Tyrrell-Ford	G	49	+ 1 Lap	12	
11	9	(West Germany) Hans-Joachim Stuck	ATS-Ford	G	49	+ 1 Lap	15	
12	36	(Italy) Vittorio Brambilla	Alfa Romeo	G	49	+ 1 Lap	22	
13	29	(Italy) Riccardo Patrese	Arrows-Ford	G	47	+ 3 Laps	17	
14	15	(France) Jean-Pierre Jabouille	Renault	M	45	Engine	1	
Ret	26	(France) Jacques Laffite	Ligier-Ford	G	41	Engine	7	
Ret	20	(Finland) Keke Rosberg	Wolf-Ford	G	41	Engine	23	
Ret	25	(Belgium) Jacky Ickx	Ligier-Ford	G	40	Engine	11	
Ret	18	(Italy) Elio de Angelis	Shadow-Ford	G	33	Clutch	24	
Ret	35	(Italy) Bruno Giacomelli	Alfa Romeo	G	28	Spun Off	18	
Ret	16	(France) René Arnoux	Renault	M	13	Engine	2	
Ret	7	(United Kingdom) John Watson	McLaren-Ford	G	13	Accident	19	
Ret	8	(France) Patrick Tambay	McLaren-Ford	G	3	Engine	14	
Ret	30	(West Germany) Jochen Mass	Arrows-Ford	G	3	Suspension	21	
Ret	6	(Brazil) Nelson Piquet	Brabham-Alfa Romeo	G	1	Accident	8	
DNQ	17	(Netherlands) Jan Lammers	Shadow-Ford	G				
DNQ	22	(Switzerland) Marc Surer	Ensign-Ford	G				
DNQ	24	(Italy) Arturo Merzario	Merzario-Ford	G				
DNQ	31	(Mexico) Héctor Rebaque	Rebaque-Ford	G				

== Notes ==
- This was the Formula One World Championship debut for Swiss driver Marc Surer.
- This race marked the 10th Grand Prix win for a South African driver.
- This was the Formula One World Championship debut for Mexican constructor Rebaque - the first from the North American country.
- This was the 300th Grand Prix start for Ferrari. In those 300 races, Ferrari had won 78 Grands Prix, achieved 255 podium finishes, 89 pole positions, 88 fastest laps, 23 Grand Slams and had won 9 Driver's and 6 Constructor's Championships.

== Championship standings after the race ==
Drivers' Championship standings

	Pos	Driver	Points
	1	(South Africa) **Jody Scheckter**	51 (57)
2	2	(Canada) Gilles Villeneuve	38
1	3	(France) Jacques Laffite	36
1	4	(Australia) Alan Jones	34
	5	(Switzerland) Clay Regazzoni	27 (28)

Constructors' Championship standings

	Pos	Constructor	Points
	1	(Italy) **Ferrari**	95
1	2	(United Kingdom) Williams-Ford	62
1	3	(France) Ligier-Ford	61
	4	(United Kingdom) Lotus-Ford	39
	5	(United Kingdom) Tyrrell-Ford	22

- Note: Only the top five positions are included for both sets of standings. Only the best 4 results from the first 7 races and the best 4 results from the last 8 races counted towards the Drivers' Championship. Numbers without parentheses are Championship points; numbers in parentheses are total points scored.
- **Bold text** indicates the 1979 World Champions.

Previous race: 1979 Dutch Grand Prix	FIA Formula One World Championship; 1979 season	Next race: 1979 Canadian Grand Prix
Previous race: 1978 Italian Grand Prix	Italian Grand Prix	Next race: 1980 Italian Grand Prix
Awards
Preceded by 1978 British Grand Prix	Formula One Promotional Trophy for Race Promoter; 1979	Succeeded by 1980 Italian Grand Prix
