= Alfa Romeo 177 =

Formula One car

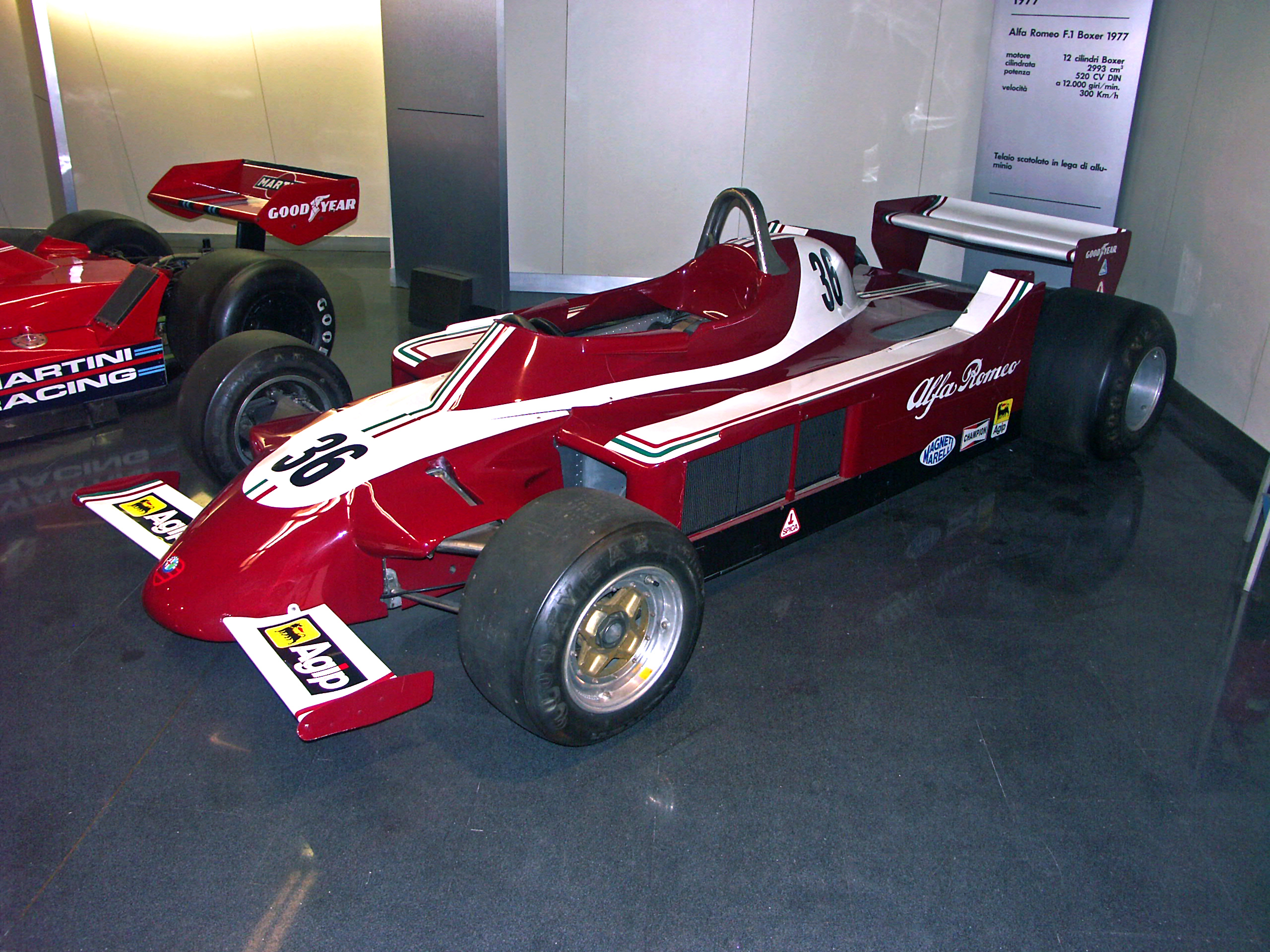
- Alfa Romeo 177 (1977-spec) in Alfa Romeo Museum.
- Category: Formula One
- Constructor: Alfa Romeo
- Designers: Carlo Chiti; Robert Choulet
- Predecessor: Alfa Special
- Successor: 179

Technical specifications
- Chassis: Aluminium monocoque
- Length: 3,120 millimetres (123 in)
- Width: 1,850 millimetres (73 in)
- Height: 890 millimetres (35 in)
- Axle track: 1,660 millimetres (65 in) (Front); 1,610 millimetres (63 in) (Rear)
- Wheelbase: 2,740 mm (107.9 in)
- Engine: Alfa-Romeo 115-12 2,995 cubic centimetres (182.8 cu in; 2.995 L) flat-12 naturally aspirated, mid-engined, longitudinally mounted
- Transmission: Hewland-Alfa Romeo 6 manual
- Power: 493 brake horsepower (500 PS; 368 kW) @ 9,700 rpm 377 newton-metres (278 lbf⋅ft) @ 3,900 rpm
- Weight: 610 kg (1,344.8 lb)
- Fuel: Agip
- Tyres: Goodyear

Competition history
- Notable entrants: Autodelta
- Notable drivers: 35. (Italy) Bruno Giacomelli; 36. (Italy) Vittorio Brambilla
- Debut: 1979 Belgian Grand Prix
Races	Wins	Poles	F/Laps
3	0	0	0
- Constructors' Championships: 0
- Drivers' Championships: 0
- Unless otherwise stated, all data refer to Formula One World Championship Grands Prix only.

The Alfa Romeo 177 was a Formula One car used by the Alfa Romeo team during the 1979 Formula One season, debuting at the 1979 Belgian Grand Prix. The 177 marked Alfa Romeo's return to Formula One, 28 years after winning the World Drivers' Championship titles in 1950 and 1951.

== Design and development ==
The car was constructed by Alfa Romeo's racing department Autodelta, and featured a Carlo Chiti designed Alfa Romeo flat-12 engine which had been used earlier in the Alfa Romeo 33TT12 and 33SC12 sports cars. In 1976 this engine was supplied to Brabham and the deal continued until 1979.

The 177, the designation of which was derived from the fact that its design was commenced in 1977, was a bulky car finished in the handsome dark red colour adopted by Autodelta. The 177 featured a riveted aluminium chassis, with front suspension by upper rocking arms, lower wishbones and inboard-mounted coil spring/damper units. The rear suspension featured parallel lower links, single top links, twin radius rods and outboard coil spring/damper units. Bruno Giacomelli had won the 1978 European Formula Two Championship in a March and was hired to drive the new Alfa Romeo 177; he used this car at Belgian and French Grands Prix.

The Alfa Romeo 179 with a new V12 engine was ready for the Italian Grand Prix at Monza so Giacomelli drove the new car while the 177 was raced by Vittorio Brambilla. Both drivers raced the 179 thereafter.

== Racing history ==
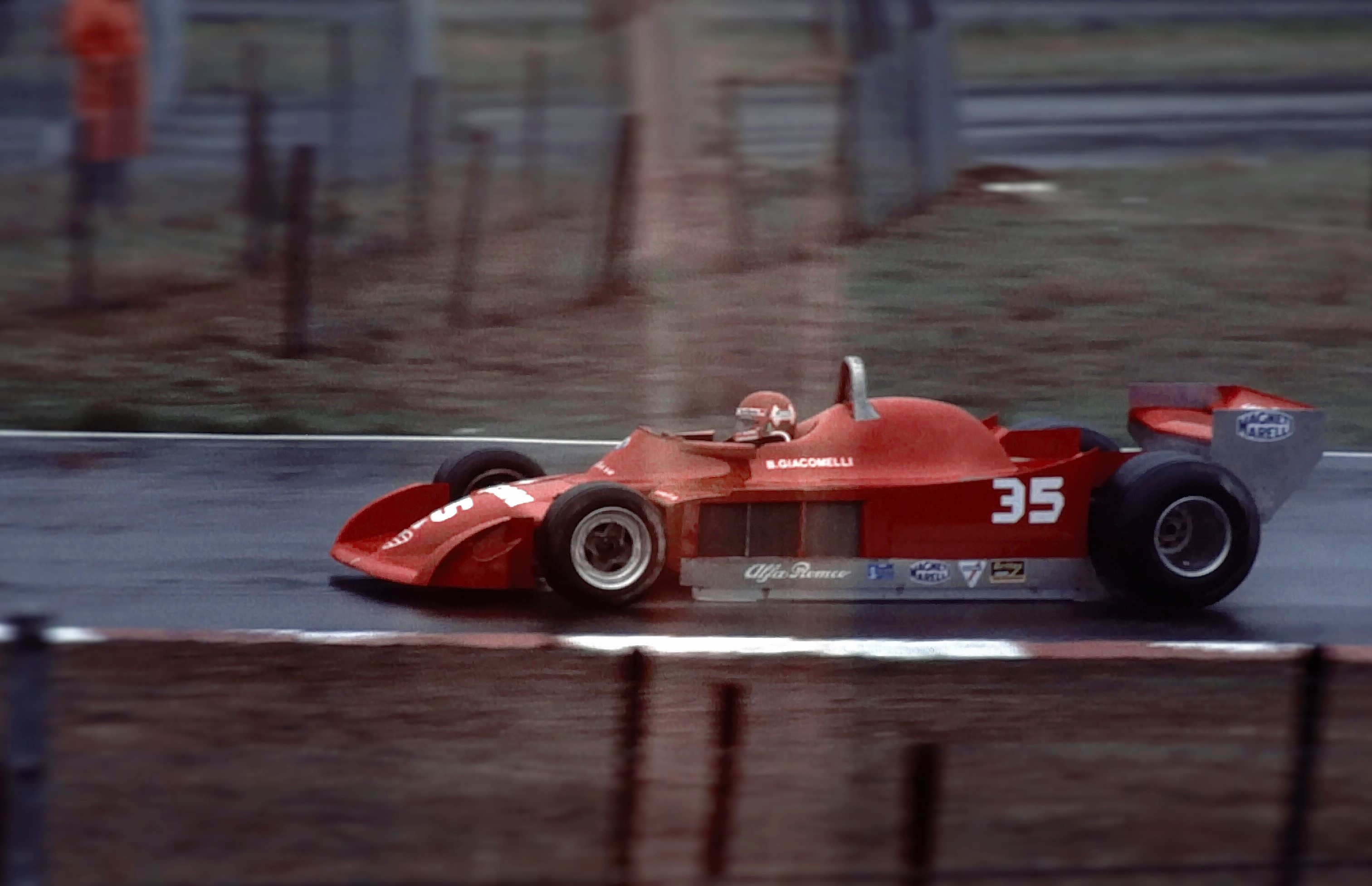
Bruno Giacomelli - Zolder 1979

Giacomelli qualified the car strongly at Zolder for the Belgian Grand Prix, lining up in 14th place, only two seconds off the pole-time of Jacques Laffite's Ligier, and ahead of more experienced competitors, most notably both McLaren cars. A poor start left him in 18th place on lap 1, but he slowly made his way through the field through the misfortune of others, only losing ground to the McLaren of John Watson, surging through the pack from his lowly grid position. He had made it to 13th position by lap 21 with the Shadow of Elio de Angelis chasing hard. De Angelis tried to pass at the chicane, but clumsily clouted the Alfa Romeo, damaging Giacomelli's rear wing and putting both cars out of the race.

The team missed the Monaco Grand Prix a fortnight later, but returned in France for the race at Dijon-Prenois. Giacomelli's qualifying pace was not so strong, and he started the race in 17th place, nearly 3.5 seconds behind Jean-Pierre Jabouille's pole time in the Renault. Another poor start put him 20th at the end of lap 1, although he quickly passed Jan Lammers's struggling Shadow. He once again slowly picked up places as others fell by the wayside, and by lap 20 he had regained 17th. However the car seemed to suffer from a lack of pace in the next phase of the race, and Giacomelli was passed by Riccardo Patrese and Jochen Mass of Arrows, Héctor Rebaque in the Lotus and his old foe de Angelis in quick succession, dropping to 20th by lap 26. He slowly started to pick up the pace again, and was able to finally re-pass de Angelis on lap 51, and the pair moved up the order as other cars fell out, eventually lying 16th and 17th. The two Italians continued to fight for the remainder of the race, being lapped five times by leader Jabouille in the process. With Jabouille already having crossed the finish line, lap 75 would be their last lap, and de Angelis passed Giacomelli with mere yards of the race remaining to take 16th place from him at the death.

After the disappointments of the team's first two races, Alfa Romeo skipped the next four and arrived at Monza for the Italian Grand Prix in September with a two-car team for the first time. Giacomelli was driving the new 179 while Vittorio Brambilla was hired to drive the 177. Brambilla had been out of F1 for a year after injuries sustained at Monza the previous year, in the same crash that killed Ronnie Peterson. Brambilla, who had been at the wheel of a Surtees that day, qualified a lowly 22nd, four seconds off Jabouille's pole time and over half a second behind Giacomelli in the new car. Although Emerson Fittipaldi and de Angelis passed him on lap 11, in general his position improved through the race as others hit trouble, including Giacomelli, who spun off on lap 29, leaving Brambilla's 177 as the sole Alfa representative. Although he was passed late on by Alan Jones, fighting through the pack after his early troubles in the Williams, some other retirements allowed him to finish a creditable 12th, only a lap behind Jody Scheckter's winning Ferrari. This would remain Alfa's best result of the season, even though new 179s were provided for both drivers in the remaining two races.

The 179 would take over permanently as the team attempted a full campaign in 1980, so these three races remain the 177's only impact on the F1 record books.

== Complete Formula One results ==
(key)

Year	Team	Engine	Tyres	Drivers	1	2	3	4	5	6	7	8	9	10	11	12	13	14	15	Points	WCC
1979	Autodelta	Alfa Romeo 115-12 F12	G		ARG	BRA	RSA	USW	ESP	BEL	MON	FRA	GBR	GER	AUT	NED	ITA	CAN	USA	0	16th
1979	Autodelta	Alfa Romeo 115-12 F12	G	Bruno Giacomelli						Ret		17								0	16th
1979	Autodelta	Alfa Romeo 115-12 F12	G	Vittorio Brambilla													12			0	16th
