= Alfa Romeo 182 =

Alfa Romeo 182 Alfa Romeo 182B
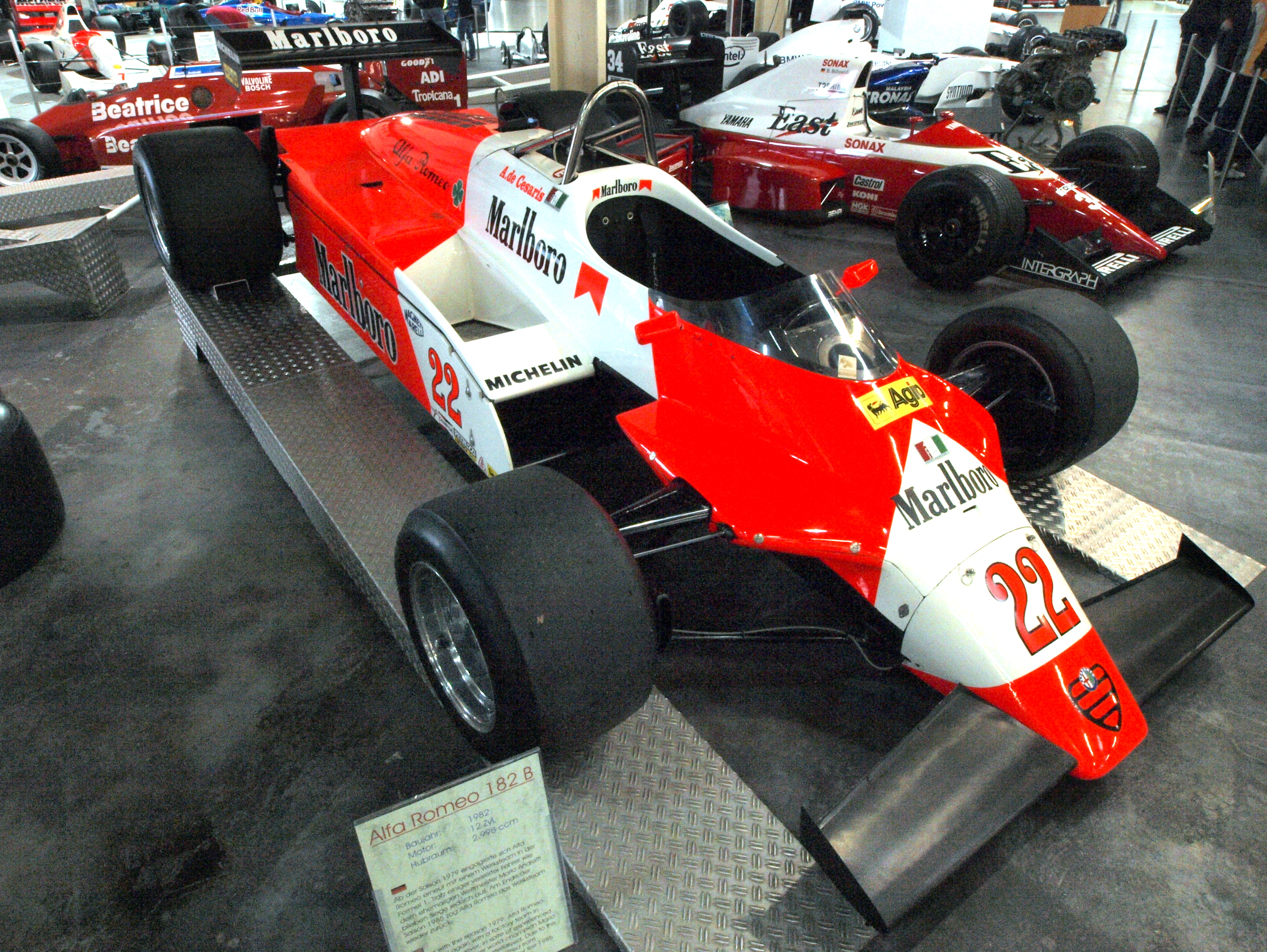
- Category: Formula One
- Constructor: Alfa Romeo
- Designers: Gérard Ducarouge (Technical Director); Mario Tollentino (Chief Designer)
- Predecessor: 179D
- Successor: 183T

Technical specifications
- Chassis: Carbon-fibre monocoque
- Axle track: Front: 1,800 mm (71 in); Rear: 1,670 mm (66 in)
- Wheelbase: 2,720 mm (107.1 in)
- Engine: Alfa Romeo 1260, 2,991 cc (182.5 cu in), 60° V12, NA, mid-engine, longitudinally mounted
- Transmission: Alfa Romeo 5/6-speed manual
- Weight: 585 kg (1,289.7 lb)
- Fuel: Agip
- Tyres: Michelin

Competition history
- Notable entrants: Marlboro Team Alfa Romeo
- Notable drivers: 22. (Italy) Andrea de Cesaris; 23. (Italy) Bruno Giacomelli
- Debut: 1982 Brazilian Grand Prix
Races	Wins	Poles	F/Laps
15	0	1	0
- Constructors' Championships: 0
- Drivers' Championships: 0
- Unless otherwise stated, all data refer to Formula One World Championship Grands Prix only.

The Alfa Romeo 182 is a Formula One car that was used by the Alfa Romeo team during the 1982 Formula One season.

== Design ==
Alfa Romeo used three different models throughout 1982: the 179D (2 entries), the 182 (28 entries) and the 182B (2 entries); all with Alfa Romeo 3.0 L V12 engines. The Alfa Romeo V12 produced about 540 hp (403 kW) at 12000 rpm.

At a time when downforce-generating tunnels were virtually unlimited in dimensions, designer Mario Tollentino chose to use smaller tunnels that did not pass through the rear drive halfshafts, with only the lower suspension control arms intruding into the low-pressure area, making for a very clean and efficient airflow.

The 182B variant was tested for the first time at the 1982 Belgian Grand Prix at Zolder; this version was 12 centimetres (4.7 in) narrower and had a new exhaust and side skirts.

At the Italian Grand Prix, a turbo variant of this car, designated 182T, which carried a V8 turbo engine was tested by Andrea de Cesaris. It was not used in the race though. This version was derived from the 182D version. The 182T was converted to one of five 183Ts later next year.

== Competition history ==
The car made its debut at the 1982 Brazilian Grand Prix. In the third race of the season at Long Beach, Andrea de Cesaris achieved pole position at an average speed of 141.331 km/h (87.819 mph). The best race was at Monaco, where de Cesaris placed 3rd.

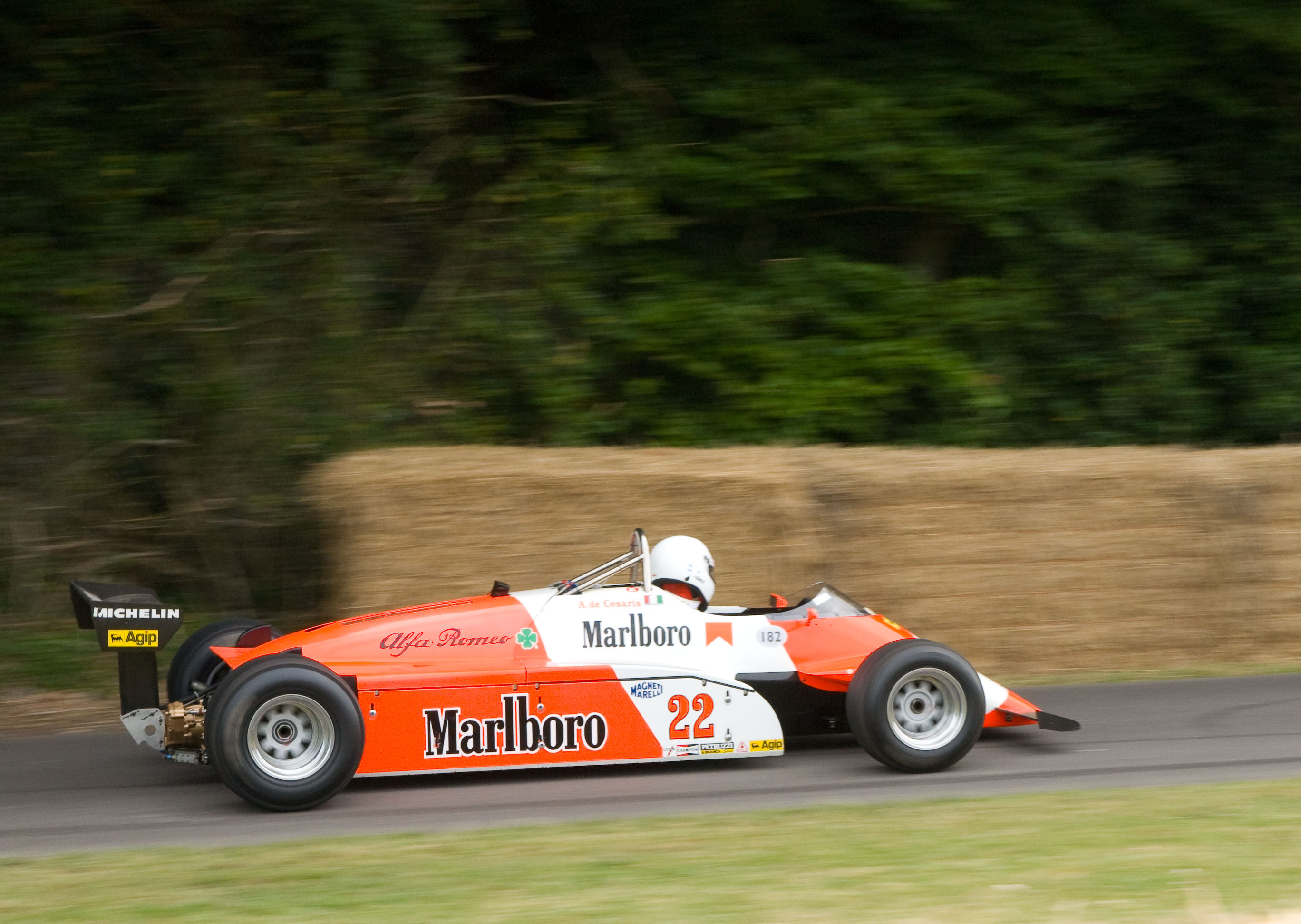
182 presented at the 2010 Goodwood Festival of Speed.

Alfa Romeo 182 at Goodwood Festival of Speed 2010

== Technical information ==
	Alfa Romeo 182
Engine	Tipo-1260-60°-V12 (block and heads light alloy) 165 kg
Displacement	2991 cm^{3} / 182.5 cu in
bore × stroke	78.5 mm × 51.5 mm
Compression ratio	11.0 : 1
max. Torque:	343 Nm at 9500 rpm
max. power	403 kW (540 hp) at 12,000 rpm
HP per litre of displacement:	181 HP
Valve control	two overhead camshafts, 4 valves per cylinder
Mixture preparation	Lucas Intake manifold injection
Cooling	Water
Gearbox	6-speed gearbox (rear-wheel drive)
Brakes	ventilated disc brakes on all wheels
Front suspension	Double wishbones, the inwardly extended upper links actuate the inner spring-damper units, stabilizer
Rear suspension	double wishbones, the inwardly extended upper links actuate the inner spring-damper units, stabilizer
Body and frame	Chassis: Monocoque in sandwich construction with cover layers made of carbon fibre reinforced plastic and honeycomb core; engine as a load-bearing part
Wheelbase	2720 mm
Track width front / rear	1820 mm / 1680 mm
Tire size front	unknown
Tire size rear	unknown
Dimensions L × W × H	4390 mm × 2150 mm × 900 mm
Empty weight (without driver)	585 kg
Tank capacity	unknown
Fuel consumption	unknown
Top speed	depending on the gear ratio
Power to weight ratio (hp/kg)	0.93 HP/kg

== Complete Formula One results ==
(key) (results in bold indicate pole position)

Year	Team	Engine	Tyres	Drivers	1	2	3	4	5	6	7	8	9	10	11	12	13	14	15	16	Points	WCC
1982	Marlboro Team Alfa Romeo	Alfa Romeo 1260 V12	**MI**		RSA	BRA	USW	SMR	BEL	MON	DET	CAN	NED	GBR	FRA	GER	AUT	SUI	ITA	CPL	**7**	**10th**
1982	Marlboro Team Alfa Romeo	Alfa Romeo 1260 V12	**MI**	Andrea de Cesaris		Ret	**Ret**	Ret	Ret	3	Ret	6	Ret	Ret	Ret	Ret	Ret	10	10	9	**7**	**10th**
1982	Marlboro Team Alfa Romeo	Alfa Romeo 1260 V12	**MI**	Bruno Giacomelli		Ret	Ret	Ret	Ret	Ret	Ret	Ret	11	7	9	5	Ret	12	Ret	10	**7**	**10th**
