= 1979 Belgian Grand Prix =

- Race 6 of 15 in the 1979 Formula One season

Race details
- Date: 13 May 1979
- Location: Circuit Zolder; Heusden-Zolder, Belgium
- Course length: 4.262 km (2.648 miles)
- Distance: 70 laps, 298.340 km (185.380 miles)
- Weather: Dry

Pole position
Driver	(France) Jacques Laffite	Ligier-Ford
- Time: 1:21.13

Fastest lap
Driver	(Canada) Gilles Villeneuve	Ferrari
- Time: 1:23.09 on lap 63

Podium
First	(South Africa) Jody Scheckter	Ferrari
Second	(France) Jacques Laffite	Ligier-Ford
Third	(France) Didier Pironi	Tyrrell-Ford

The 1979 Belgian Grand Prix was a Formula One motor race held on 13 May 1979 at Zolder. It was the sixth race of the 1979 World Championship of F1 Drivers and the 1979 International Cup for F1 Constructors.

The 70-lap race was won by Jody Scheckter, driving a Ferrari. Jacques Laffite finished second in a Ligier-Ford, having started from pole position, while Didier Pironi achieved his first podium finish with third in a Tyrrell-Ford.

The race also saw the first appearance of Alfa Romeo as a works team since 1951. Driving the Alfa Romeo 177, Bruno Giacomelli qualified 14th, ahead of both Renaults and both McLarens, before retiring following a collision with Elio de Angelis in the Shadow-Ford.

== Qualifying ==
=== Qualifying classification ===
Pos	Driver	Constructor	Time	No
1	Jacques Laffite	Ligier-Ford	1:21,13	1
2	Patrick Depailler	Ligier-Ford	1:21,20	2
3	Nelson Piquet	Brabham-Alfa Romeo	1:21,35	3
4	Alan Jones	Williams-Ford	1:21,59	4
5	Mario Andretti	Lotus-Ford	1:21,83	5
6	Gilles Villeneuve	Ferrari	1:22,08	6
7	Jody Scheckter	Ferrari	1:22,09	7
8	Clay Regazzoni	Williams-Ford	1:22,40	8
9	James Hunt	Wolf-Ford	1:22,55	9
10	Carlos Reutemann	Lotus-Ford	1:22,56	10
11	Jean-Pierre Jarier	Tyrrell-Ford	1:22,68	11
12	Didier Pironi	Tyrrell-Ford	1:22,85	12
13	Niki Lauda	Brabham-Alfa Romeo	1:22,87	13
14	Bruno Giacomelli	Alfa Romeo	1:23,15	14
15	Héctor Rebaque	Lotus-Ford	1:23,63	15
16	Riccardo Patrese	Arrows-Ford	1:23,92	16
17	Jean-Pierre Jabouille	Renault	1:24,02	17
18	René Arnoux	Renault	1:24,33	18
19	John Watson	McLaren-Ford	1:24,37	19
20	Hans-Joachim Stuck	ATS-Ford	1:24,62	20
21	Jan Lammers	Shadow-Ford	1:24,76	21
22	Jochen Mass	Arrows-Ford	1:25,08	22
23	Emerson Fittipaldi	Fittipaldi-Ford	1:25,18	23
24	Elio de Angelis	Shadow-Ford	1:25,48	24
DNQ	Patrick Tambay	McLaren-Ford	1:25,69	—
DNQ	Arturo Merzario	Merzario-Ford	1:25,92	—
DNQ	Derek Daly	Ensign-Ford	1:27,83	—
DNQ	Gianfranco Brancatelli	Kauhsen-Ford	1:34,48	—

== Race ==
=== Classification ===
Pos	No	Driver	Constructor	Tyre	Laps	Time/Retired	Grid	Points
1	11	(South Africa) Jody Scheckter	Ferrari	MI	70	1:39:59.53	7	9
2	26	(France) Jacques Laffite	Ligier-Ford	G	70	+ 15.36	1	6
3	3	(France) Didier Pironi	Tyrrell-Ford	G	70	+ 35.17	12	4
4	2	(Argentina) Carlos Reutemann	Lotus-Ford	G	70	+ 46.49	10	3
5	29	(Italy) Riccardo Patrese	Arrows-Ford	G	70	+ 1:04.31	16	2
6	7	(United Kingdom) John Watson	McLaren-Ford	G	70	+ 1:05.85	19	1
7	12	(Canada) Gilles Villeneuve	Ferrari	MI	69	+ 1 Lap	6	
8	9	(West Germany) Hans-Joachim Stuck	ATS-Ford	G	69	+ 1 Lap	20	
9	14	(Brazil) Emerson Fittipaldi	Fittipaldi-Ford	G	68	+ 2 Laps	23	
10	17	(Netherlands) Jan Lammers	Shadow-Ford	G	68	+ 2 Laps	21	
11	4	(France) Jean-Pierre Jarier	Tyrrell-Ford	G	67	+ 3 Laps	11	
Ret	25	(France) Patrick Depailler	Ligier-Ford	G	46	Accident	2	
Ret	20	(United Kingdom) James Hunt	Wolf-Ford	G	40	Accident	9	
Ret	27	(Australia) Alan Jones	Williams-Ford	G	39	Electrical	4	
Ret	1	(United States) Mario Andretti	Lotus-Ford	G	27	Brakes	5	
Ret	6	(Brazil) Nelson Piquet	Brabham-Alfa Romeo	G	23	Engine	3	
Ret	5	(Austria) Niki Lauda	Brabham-Alfa Romeo	G	23	Engine	13	
Ret	16	(France) René Arnoux	Renault	MI	22	Turbo	18	
Ret	35	(Italy) Bruno Giacomelli	Alfa Romeo	G	21	Collision	14	
Ret	18	(Italy) Elio de Angelis	Shadow-Ford	G	21	Collision	24	
Ret	30	(West Germany) Jochen Mass	Arrows-Ford	G	17	Spun Off	22	
Ret	31	(Mexico) Héctor Rebaque	Lotus-Ford	G	13	Transmission	15	
Ret	15	(France) Jean-Pierre Jabouille	Renault	MI	13	Turbo	17	
Ret	28	(Switzerland) Clay Regazzoni	Williams-Ford	G	1	Collision	8	
DNQ	8	(France) Patrick Tambay	McLaren-Ford	G				
DNQ	24	(Italy) Arturo Merzario	Merzario-Ford	G				
DNQ	22	(Republic of Ireland) Derek Daly	Ensign-Ford	G				
DNQ	36	(Italy) Gianfranco Brancatelli	Kauhsen-Ford	G				

== Notes ==
- This race saw the 10th pole position set by a French driver and the 5th fastest lap set by a Canadian driver.
- This was the 50th Grand Prix start for a Dutch driver.
- This was the 5th pole position for Ligier.

== Championship standings after the race ==
Drivers' Championship standings

	Pos	Driver	Points
2	1	(France) Jacques Laffite	24
3	2	(South Africa) Jody Scheckter	24 (25)
2	3	(Canada) Gilles Villeneuve	20
2	4	(France) Patrick Depailler	20
1	5	(Argentina) Carlos Reutemann	19 (21)

Constructors' Championship standings

	Pos	Constructor	Points
1	1	(Italy) Ferrari	45
1	2	(France) Ligier-Ford	44
	3	(United Kingdom) Lotus-Ford	33
	4	(United Kingdom) Tyrrell-Ford	15
	5	(United Kingdom) McLaren-Ford	5

- Note: Only the top five positions are included for both sets of standings. Only the best 4 results from the first 7 races and the best 4 results from the last 8 races counted towards the Drivers' Championship. Numbers without parentheses are Championship points; numbers in parentheses are total points scored.

Previous race: 1979 Spanish Grand Prix	FIA Formula One World Championship; 1979 season	Next race: 1979 Monaco Grand Prix
Previous race: 1978 Belgian Grand Prix	Belgian Grand Prix	Next race: 1980 Belgian Grand Prix
