= Flat-twelve engine =

Horizontally-opposed 12-cylinder piston engine

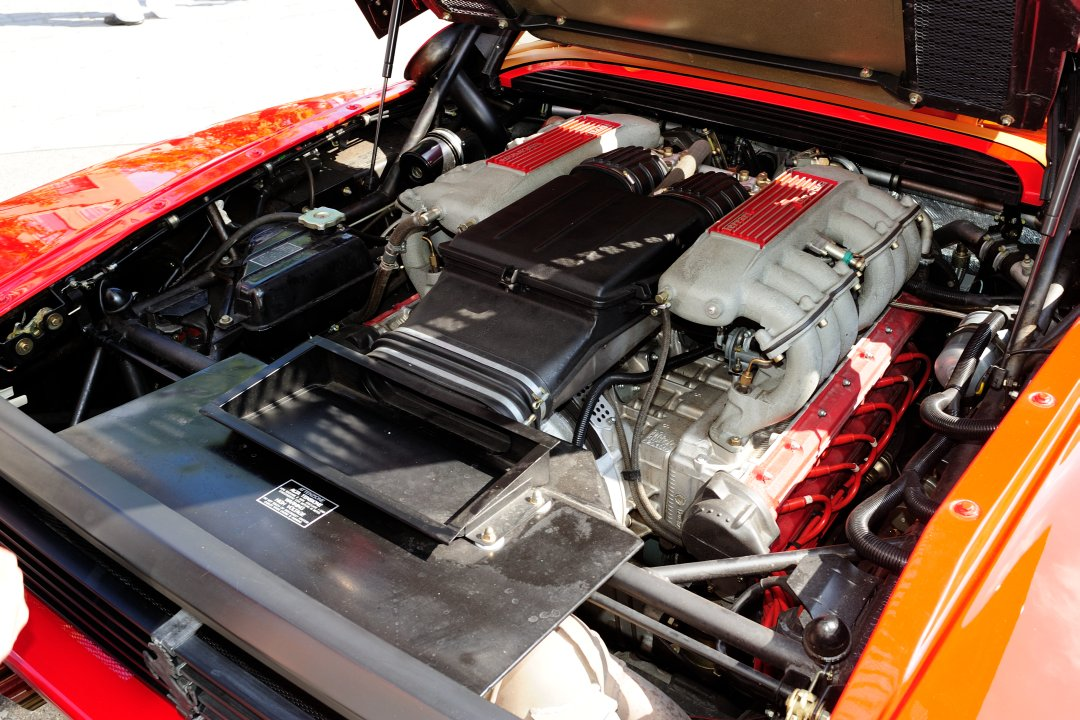
1984–1991 Ferrari Testarossa mid-mounted engine

A flat-twelve engine (also known as a horizontally opposed-twelve) is a twelve-cylinder piston engine with six cylinders on each side of a central crankshaft.

Flat-twelve engines are less common than V12 engines, but they have been used in various racing cars during the 1960s and 1970s, and in mid-engined Ferrari road cars from 1973 to 1996.

== Design ==
Unlike most flat-twin, flat-four, and flat-six engines, flat-twelve engines typically use the crankshaft configuration of a 180° V engine. Instead of the boxer engine design of each piston having its own crankpin, flat-twelve engines have each pair of pistons sharing a crankpin, and thus are flat, but not true boxers.

Compared with a V12 engine, a flat-twelve has a lower center of gravity, but because a flat-twelve is wider they are rarely used in front-engined cars.

== Racing cars ==
=== Formula One ===
The first known flat-twelve engine was built by Porsche in 1947 for the abandoned Cisitalia Grand Prix racing car. The engine, known as the Porsche Type 360, was supercharged and had a displacement of 1.5 L (92 cu in). One engine was built and the car conducted top speed testing, but it never competed in any races.

In 1964–65, the Ferrari 512 F1 competed in several Formula One races. The 512 F1 was powered by a 1.5 L (92 cu in) flat-twelve engine and raced alongside the V8-engined Ferrari 158 upon which it was based. Ferrari returned to using flat-twelve engines in 1970, when the Ferrari 312B switched from the V12 engine used by its predecessor. Its successor, the Ferrari 312T, was introduced in 1975 and won the Formula One constructors championships from 1975 to 1979. The success of the Ferrari 312T led other Formula One teams to build flat-twelve engines, such as the 1979 Alfa Romeo 177.

In 1990, the Subaru 1235 flat-twelve engine was built for Subaru's unsuccessful attempt to compete in Formula One as an engine manufacturer.

=== Sports car racing ===
Porsche 917 flat-12
Eleven 917s pull away at Goodwood Festival of Speed 2009

In 1969, the Porsche 917 sports prototype racing car introduced an air-cooled flat-twelve engine. This flat-twelve engine was based on the previous flat-eight engine, but it used a V12 crankshaft configuration instead of the boxer configuration used by the flat-eight. The domination of the Porsche 917 probably influenced Ferrari, because they switched from V12 engines to flat-twelve engines for the Ferrari 312 PB, which competed from 1971 to 1973. Alfa Romeo also used flat-twelve engines in the 1973–1976 Alfa Romeo 33TT12 and Alfa Romeo 33SC12 sports prototype racing cars.

For the 1991 sports-prototype racing category, Mercedes-Benz switched from a twin-turbo V8 engine to a naturally aspirated flat-twelve engine for in the Mercedes-Benz C291 racing car. This engine employed a cylinder-head design with exhaust ports where the intake ports would normally be (on top of the engine, pointing upwards). The intake ports are between the intake and exhaust camshafts, just above the spark-plugs, pointing at an outward angle from the vertical. This was done to allow the engine to be installed lower in the chassis. The C291 was unsuccessful and Mercedes withdrew from sports-prototype racing after the 1991 season.

== Production cars ==
From 1973 to 1996, Ferrari used flat-twelve engines in various production models: the 1973–1976 Ferrari 365 GT/4 BB, the 1976–1981 Ferrari 512 BB, the 1981–1984 Ferrari 512 BBi, the 1984–1991 Ferrari Testarossa, the 1991–1994 Ferrari 512 TR and the 1994–1996 Ferrari F512 M.

== Other uses ==
During World War II, the British Covenanter tank was powered by a Meadows D.A.V flat-12, 340 hp (250 kW) and the Churchill by a 350 hp (261 kW) Bedford engine flat-12. Another military vehicle usage was the Panhard EBR armored cars during the 1950s.

During the 1940s, the Franklin Engine Company in the United States produced a flat-twelve aircraft engine called the O-805-2.
