= 1975 Formula Atlantic season =

1975 Formula Atlantic season
Previous: 1974	Next: 1976 IMSA; 1976 CASC

The 1975 Player's Canadian Formula Atlantic Series season was contested over 6 rounds. In this one-make engine formula all drivers had to use Ford engines.

== Calendar ==
Race No	Track	State	Date	Laps	Distance	Time	Speed	Winner	Pole position	Fastest race lap
1	Edmonton	Canada	May 25, 1975	40	4.067=162.68 km	?	? km/h	Bertil Roos	Tom Klausler	Tom Klausler
2	Westwood	Canada	June 1, 1975	57	2.89674=165.11418 km	1'01:08.320	162.039 km/h	Bertil Roos	Bobby Rahal	Bertil Roos
3	Gimli	Canada	June 22, 1975	75	2.140369=160.527675 km	?	? km/h	Gilles Villeneuve	Bill Brack	?
4	Mont-Tremblant	Canada	July 6, 1975	38	4.264645=162.05651 km	?	? km/h	Elliott Forbes-Robinson	Bill Brack	Gilles Villeneuve
5	Mosport Park	Canada	July 20, 1975	41	3.957=162.237 km	1'10:24.220	138.263 km/h	Elliott Forbes-Robinson	Bertil Roos	Elliott Forbes-Robinson
6	Halifax	Canada	August 7, 1975	65	? km	1'11:45.826	? km/h	Bill Brack	Bill Brack	Bill Brack

== Final points standings ==
=== Driver ===
For every race the points were awarded: 30 points to the winner, 24 for runner-up, 19 for third place, 15 for fourth place, 12 for fifth place, 10 for sixth place, 9 seventh place, winding down to 1 point for 15th place. No additional points were awarded. All results count.

Place	Name	Country	Team	Chassis	Total points	(Canada)	(Canada)	(Canada)	(Canada)	(Canada)	(Canada)
1	Bill Brack	Canada	Brack Racing	Chevron	112	19	24	15	-	24	30
2	Bertil Roos	Sweden	Ecurie Canada	March	94	30	30	-	15	19	-
3	Tom Klausler	United States	Klausler Racing	Lola	92	24	19	-	19	6	24
4	Elliott Forbes-Robinson	United States	Scott Racing	Lola	75	-	15	-	30	30	-
5	Gilles Villeneuve	Canada	Ecurie Canada	March	69	1	12	30	24	-	2
6	Howdy Holmes	United States	Scott Racing	Lola	59	9	6	5	12	8	19
7	Bobby Dennett	Venezuela	Fred Opert Racing	Chevron	41	7	4	1	10	12	7
8	John Nicholson	New Zealand	McCall Racing	Tui	37	8	-	9	8	-	12
9	Bobby Rahal	United States	Capricorn Racing	Lola	34	-	10	24	-	-	-
10	Craig Hill	Canada	Ecurie Canada	March	26	-	9	4	-	9	4
11	Tom Gloy	United States	Gloy Racing	Lola	22	15	-	7	-	-	-
12	Bruce Jensen	Canada	Jensen Racing	Chevron	21	3	-	8	-	-	10
13	Price Cobb	United States	Shierson Racing	March	19	-	-	19	-	-	-
	Juan Cochesa	Venezuela	Fred Opert Racing	Chevron	19	-	-	6	5	7	1
15	Peter Ferguson	Canada	Ferguson Canada Racing	Chevron	17	5	2	-	2	-	8
16	Héctor Rebaque	Mexico	Fred Opert Racing	Chevron	16	6	-	-	-	10	-
	Chip Mead	United States	Shierson Racing	March	16	-	3	-	4	-	9
18	Tom Pumpelly	United States	Shierson Racing	March	15	-	-	-	-	15	-
	Dave Walker	Australia	Joubert Racing	Lola	15	-	-	-	-	-	15
20	Bobby Brown	United States	B&B Racing	Chevron	14	2	8	-	-	4	-
21	Mike Hall	United States	United Racing	Lola	13	4	-	-	9	-	-
22	Allen Karlberg	United States	?	Lola	12	12	-	-	-	-	-
	Brett Lunger	United States	McCall Racing	Tui	12	-	-	12	-	-	-
	Sebe Barone	United States	Isola Racing	Chevron	12	-	-	-	7	-	5
25	Jon Woodner	United States	Shierson Racing	March	10	10	-	-	-	-	-
	Tim Cooper	United States	Shierson Racing	March	10	-	-	10	-	-	-
27	Tom Weichman	Canada	?	Lola	7	-	7	-	-	-	-
28	Frank DelVecchio	United States	DelVecchio Racing	March	6	-	-	-	6	-	-
	Tom Bagley	United States	Fred Opert Racing	Chevron	6	-	-	-	-	-	6
30	James King	Canada	Raggedy-Ann Racing	March	5	-	5	-	-	-	-
	Tim Coconis	United States	Coconis Racing	Lotus	5	-	-	-	-	5	-
32	Cliff Hansen	United States	Shierson Racing	March	4	-	-	-	3	1	-
33	Hugh Cree	Canada	?	Chevron	3	-	-	3	-	-	-
	Damien Magee	United Kingdom	McCall Racing	Tui	3	-	-	-	-	3	-
	Vince Muzzin	United States	Shierson Racing	March	3	-	1	-	-	2	-
	Guy Tunmer	South Africa	Shierson Racing	March	3	-	-	-	-	-	3
37	Michael Bystrom	United States	Bystrom Formula Racing	Brabham	2	-	-	2	-	-	-
38	Peter Broeker	Canada	Stebro Racing	March	1	-	-	-	1	-	-
