= 1977 Formula Atlantic season =

1977 Formula Atlantic season
Previous: 1976 IMSA; 1976 CASC	Next: 1978

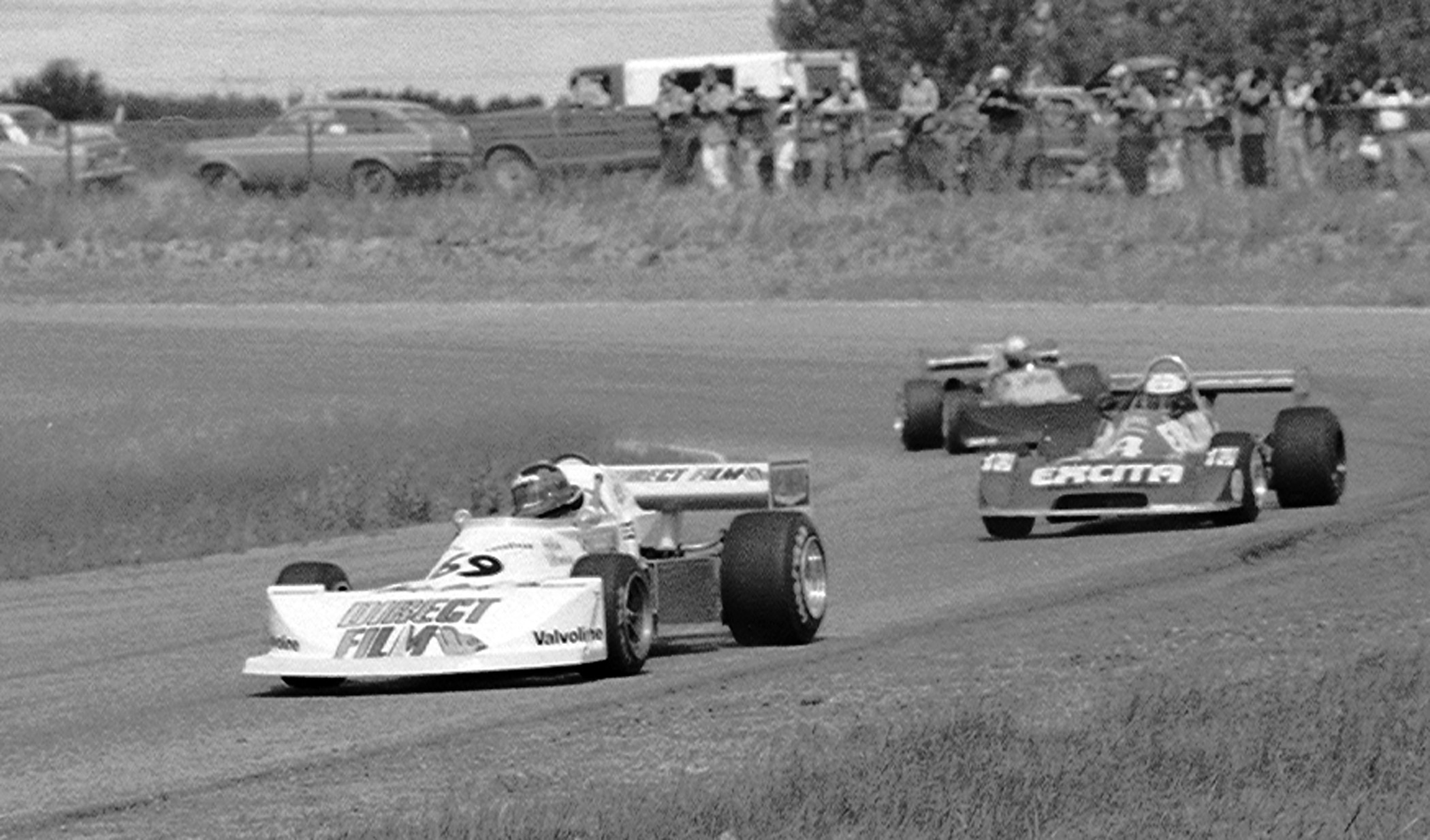
Gilles Villeneuve and Keke Rosberg at the Formula Atlantic race at Edmonton International Speedway, July 1977

The 1977 CASC Formula Atlantic Labatts Championship Series season was contested over 7 rounds. In this one-make engine formula all drivers had to use Ford engines. 39 different drivers competed in 5 different chassis.

== Calendar ==
Race No	Track	State	Date	Laps	Distance	Time	Speed	Winner	Pole position	Fastest race lap
1	Mosport Park	Canada	May 22, 1977	40	3.957=158.28 km	0'53:45.460	176.659 km/h	Price Cobb	Gilles Villeneuve	Gilles Villeneuve
2	Gimli	Canada	June 26, 1977	75	2.140369=160.527675 km	1'09:23.009	138.818 km/h	Bobby Rahal	?	Bobby Rahal
3	Edmonton	Canada	July 3, 1977	67	2.414=161.738 km	1'04:01.258	151.580 km/h	Gilles Villeneuve	Gilles Villeneuve	Price Cobb
4	Westwood	Canada	July 17, 1977	57	2.89674=165.11418 km	1'00:31.19	163.696 km/h	Keke Rosberg	Howdy Holmes	Howdy Holmes
5	Halifax	Canada	August 7, 1977	65	2.57488=167.3672 km	1'12:23.4	138.721 km/h	Bill Brack	Gilles Villeneuve	?
6	St. Félicien	Canada	August 14, 1977	100	1.6093=160.93 km	1'11:56.955	134.203 km/h	Gilles Villeneuve	Gilles Villeneuve	?
	Trois-Rivières	Canada	September 4, 1977	did not count for the championship
7	Québec City	Canada	September 25, 1977	80	2.0293273=162.346184 km	1'27:11.702	111.712 km/h	Gilles Villeneuve	Bill Brack	Howdy Holmes

== Final points standings ==
=== Driver ===
For every race the points were awarded: 30 points to the winner, 24 for runner-up, 19 for third place, 15 for fourth place, 12 for fifth place, 10 for sixth place, 9 for seventh place, winding down to 1 point for 15th place. No additional points were awarded. All results count.

Place	Name	Country	Team	Chassis	Total points	(Canada)	(Canada)	(Canada)	(Canada)	(Canada)	(Canada)	(Canada)
1	Gilles Villeneuve	Canada	Ecurie Canada	March	114	24	-	30	-	-	30	30
2	Bobby Rahal	United States	Morgan Racing	March	92	9	30	15	6	5	3
2	Bobby Rahal	United States	Pierre's Motors Racing	Ralt	92							24
3	Bill Brack	Canada	Shierson Racing	March	87	-	19	12	24	30	2	-
4	Keke Rosberg	Finland	Fred Opert Racing	Chevron	82	-	24	24	30	-	-	4
	Price Cobb	United States	Hansen Racing	March	82	30	-	19	-	24	-	9
6	Tom Gloy	United States	Shea Racing	March	68	12	8	-	12	12	24	-
7	Chip Mead	United States	Pierre's Motors Racing	Ralt	60	15	9	1	3	3	19	10
8	Kevin Cogan	United States	?	Ralt	59	19	6	-	19	-	15	-
9	Richard Spénard	Canada	Ecurie Canada	March	48	8	7	9	-	19	-	5
10	Howdy Holmes	United States	Shierson Racing	March	46	-	-	8	1	15	10	12
11	David Oxton	New Zealand	Team Tui	Tui	39	-	5	6	15	1	12	-
12	Marcel Talbot	Canada	Hine Racing	March	31	1	15	-	9	-	6	-
	Cliff Hansen	United States	Hansen Racing	March	31	-	12	7	4	8	-	-
	Gregg Young	United States	Fred Opert Racing	Chevron	31	4	2	4	5	9	7	-
15	Craig Hill	Canada	Team Ralt American	Ralt	25	-	-	-	-	10	8	7
16	Jeff Wood	United States	R&R Racing	March	23	-	4	5	-	6	-	8
17	Juan Cochesa	Venezuela	Pierre's Motors Racing	Ralt	21	-	10	10	-	-	1	-
18	Steve Saleen	United States	Clayton Racing	Ralt	19	6	3	3	7	-	-	-
	Patrick Depailler	France	Fred Opert Racing	Chevron	19	-	-	-	-	-	-	19
20	Jacques Laffite	France	Fred Opert Racing	Chevron	15	-	-	-	-	-	-	15
21	Peter Ferguson	Canada	?	Chevron	10	10	-	-	-	-	-	-
	Jon Norman	United States	Norman Racing	March	10	-	-	-	10	-	-	-
23	Didier Pironi	France	Fred Opert Racing	Chevron	9	-	-	-	-	-	9	-
24	Carl Liebich	United States	Liebrau Racing	Lola	8	-	-	-	8	-	-	-
	Brad Abbott	United States	Stimola Racing	March	8	-	-	-	-	4	4	-
	Dan Marvin	United States	Norman Racing	March	8	-	-	-	2	-	-
	Dan Marvin	United States	?	Chevron	8							6
27	Bruce Jensen	Canada	?	Chevron	7	7	-	-	-	-	-	-
	Dave McMillan	New Zealand	Team Ralt American	Ralt	7	-	-	-	-	7	-	-
	Robert Nelkin	United States	Nelkin Racing	March	7	-	1	-	-	-	5	1
30	Francisco Romero	Venezuela	Fred Opert Racing	Chevron	5	5	-	-	-	-	-	-
31	Mike Rocke	United States	R&R Racing	March	4	-	-	2	-	2	-	-
32	Tim Cooper	United States	?	March	3	3	-	-	-	-	-	-
	Rick Bell	United States	Bell Racing	Chevron	3	-	-	-	-	-	-	3
34	Bob Fisher	United States	?	March	2	2	-	-	-	-	-	-
	Gilles Léger	Canada	?	Ralt	2	-	-	-	-	-	-	2
