= 1976 Formula Atlantic season CASC =

1976 Formula Atlantic CASC season

Seasons
- ← 1975 1977 →

The 1976 CASC Formula Atlantic Players Championship Series was contested over 6 rounds. In this one-make engine formula all drivers had to utilize Ford engines.

== Calendar ==
Race No	Track	State	Date	Laps	Distance	Time	Speed	Winner	Pole position	Fastest race lap
1	Edmonton	Canada	May 16, 1976	66	2.414=159.324 km	1'03:04.0	151.577 km/h	Gilles Villeneuve	Gilles Villeneuve	Gilles Villeneuve
2	Westwood	Canada	May 30, 1976	57	2.89674=165.11418 km	1'24:08.34	117.744 km/h	Marty Loft	Gilles Villeneuve	Marty Loft
3	Gimli	Canada	June 13, 1976	75	2.140369=160.527675 km	1'07:34.241	142.542 km/h	Gilles Villeneuve	Gilles Villeneuve	Bill Brack
4	Mont-Tremblant	Canada	July 11, 1976	38	4.264645=162.05651 km	1'00:40.856	160.238 km/h	Gilles Villeneuve	Gilles Villeneuve	Gilles Villeneuve
5	Atlantic Park	Canada	August 8, 1976	65	2.57488=167.3672 km	1'10:21.4	142.730 km/h	Gilles Villeneuve	Gilles Villeneuve	Gilles Villeneuve
6	Mosport Park	Canada	August 22, 1976	41	3.957=162.237 km	0'55:03.149	176.817 km/h	Bobby Rahal	Bobby Rahal	Bobby Rahal

== Final points standings ==
=== Driver ===
For every race the points were awarded: 30 points to the winner, 24 for runner-up, 19 for third place, 15 for fourth place, 12 for fifth place, 10 for sixth place, 9 seventh place, winding down to 1 point for 15th place. No additional points were awarded. All results count.

Place	Name	Country	Team	Chassis	Total points	(Canada)	(Canada)	(Canada)	(Canada)	(Canada)	(Canada)
1	Gilles Villeneuve	Canada	Ecurie Canada	March	120	30	-	30	30	30	-
2	Bertil Roos	Sweden	Quick-Trans Racing	Lola	72	10	19	-	15	9	19
3	Bill Brack	Canada	Brack Racing	March	67	24	-	19	-	24	-
4	Price Cobb	United States	Shierson Racing	March	66	15	10	6	10
4	Price Cobb	United States	Cobb Racing	March	66					10	15
5	Tom Klausler	United States	Haas Racing	Lola	58	-	7	24	24	3	-
6	Bobby Rahal	United States	Shierson Racing	March	57	-	-	15	12	-	30
7	Howdy Holmes	United States	Scott Racing	Chevron	44	7	-	12	6
7	Howdy Holmes	United States	Shierson Racing	March	44					19	-
8	Tom Gloy	United States	Pierre's Motors Racing	Lola	39	6	9	-	-	-	24
9	Marty Loft	United States	Shierson Racing	March	38	-	30	8	-	-	-
10	Juan Cochesa	Venezuela	Fred Opert Racing	Chevron	34	9	-	10	-	6	9
11	Elliott Forbes-Robinson	United States	McCall Racing	Tui	31	12	-	-	19	-	-
12	Bruce Jensen	Canada	Jensen Racing	Chevron	29	4	-	2	3	8	12
	Bobby Brown	United States	Brown Racing	Chevron	29	3	8	9	5	-	4
14	Marcel Talbot	Canada	?	Chevron	27	-	15	-	-
14	Marcel Talbot	Canada	?	March	27					4	8
	Héctor Rebaque	Mexico	Haas Racing	Lola	27	-	5	-	8	12	2
16	Johnny Gerber	Mexico	Scott Racing	Chevron	25	1	24	-	-	-	-
17	Gordon Smiley	United States	Fred Opert Racing	Chevron	23	19	-	4	-	-	-
18	Richard Spénard	Canada	Motor Racing Canada	March	15	-	-	-	-	15	-
	Carl Liebich	United States	Liebrau Racing	Chevron	15	5	-	-	-	-	10
20	Jim Crawley	United States	?	Chevron	12	-	12	-	-	-	-
	Sebe Barone	United States	Shierson Racing	March	12	-	-	5	-	-	7
22	Cliff Hansen	United States	Shierson Racing	March	11	8	-	3	-	-	-
23	Tom Pumpelly	United States	?	March	10	-	-	1	9	-	-
	Wink Bancroft	United States	Bancroft Racing	Chevron	10	2	3	-	-	5	-
25	Chip Mead	United States	Cavanaugh Racing	Ralt	8	-	-	-	1	1	6
26	Ted Wentz	United States	?	Lola	7	-	-	7	-	-	-
	James King	Canada	Raggedy-Ann Racing	March	7	-	-	-	7	-	-
	Craig Hill	Canada	Quick-Trans Racing	Lola	7	-	-	-	-	7	-
29	Don Breidenbach	United States	?	March	6	-	6	-	-	-	-
30	Frank DelVecchio	United States	DelVecchio Racing	March	5	-	-	-	-	-	5
31	Syd Demovsky	United States	Demovsky Racing	Chevron	4	-	4	-	-	-	-
	Tim Coconis	United States	Sterling Racing	Lola	4	-	-	-	4	-	-
33	Gilles Léger	Canada	Leger Racing	Chevron	3	-	-	-	-	-	3
34	Herman Gugliotta	United States	Sterling Racing	March	2	-	2	-	-	-	-
	Tim Cooper	United States	Wilbur Racing	Lola	2	-	-	-	2	-	-
	Lloyd Callaway	United States	Callaway Racing	Chevron	2	-	-	-	-	2	-
37	Tom Weichman	United States	?	Lola	1	-	1	-	-	-	-
	John Barringer		?	?	1	-	-	-	-	-	1
