= Gimli Motorsports Park =

Multi-track motorsports facility in Manitoba, Canada

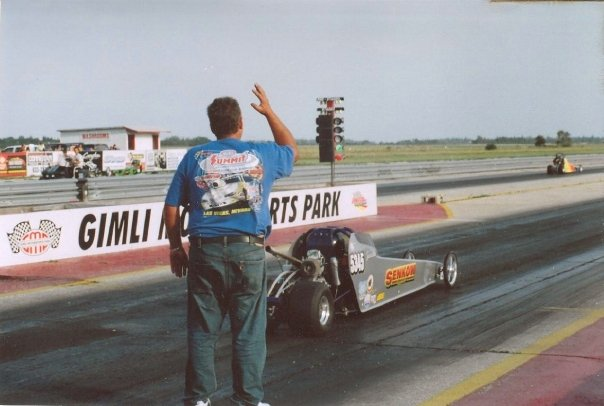
- Location: Gimli, Manitoba, Canada
- Coordinates: 50°37′35″N 97°3′5″W
- Broke ground: 1972
- Opened: 1973
- Major events: Former: Atlantic Championship; Player's Manitoba (1973–1977); Canadian Superbike Championship (1985–1988)

Road Course (1973–present)
- Length: 2.140 km (1.330 mi)
- Turns: 8

Drag Strip (1978–present)
- Length: 0.402 km (0.250 mi)

Karting Track
- Length: 1.000 km (0.621 mi)
- Turns: 13
- Race lap record: 0:35.501 (John Buzza, 2015, DD2)

Motocross Track
- Length: 2.000 km (1.243 mi)

Gimli Motorsports Park is a multi-track motorsports facility located in Gimli, Manitoba, Canada. The 95-hectare facility features a 0.250 mi (0.402 km) dragstrip, a 1.330 mi (2.140 km) road racing course, a 0.621 mi (1.000 km) karting track and a 1.243 mi (2.000 km) motocross track. The park hosts events for motorsports groups including the Winnipeg Sports Car Club, Drag Racing Association of Manitoba, Manitoba Roadracing Association (Superbikes), and the Manitoba Karting Association. The park was the site of the Gimli Glider incident in 1983, when a Boeing 767 ran out of fuel and made an improvised landing at the park.

== History ==
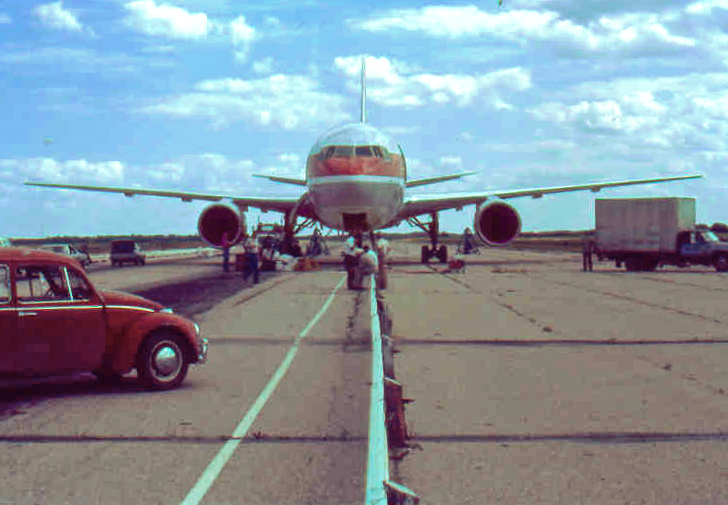
Gimli Glider

On August 6, 1972 the Winnipeg Sports Car Club organized the first road racing event on one of the original decommissioned parallel runways of RCAF Station Gimli which had closed the previous year in September 1971. Racing switched to the current dedicated 2.140 km (1.330 mi) course in 1973. Gimli Industrial Park Airport continues to operate on the second runway of the World War II airfield.

Gimli Motorsport Park was the site of the Gimli Glider aviation accident in 1983, in which Air Canada Flight 143, a Boeing 767, ran out of fuel midflight and emergency-landed on the former runway during a Formula Ford race. There were no serious injuries reported, and the plane suffered minimal damage.

From 1990 to 1996, Gimli Motorsports Park was the host of the Sunfest rock festival, which was attended by tens of thousands of people every August.

== Interlake Dragway ==
Interlake Dragway is a 0.250 mi (0.402 km) IHRA sanctioned drag strip located inside the road course. Drag racing started at the facility in 1978, and has previously operated under the names Dragways International, Viking Dragway, and Gimli Dragway.

== Former series and major race winners ==
=== CASC Atlantic Championship ===
Gimli Motorsport Park hosted the CASC Player's Challenge Series (Formula B / Atlantic Championship) from 1972 to 1977 including Gilles Villeneuve's first victory in Formula Atlantic on June 22, 1975.

Year	Date	Driver	Car
1972	August 6	(Canada) Richard Craig Hill	Lotus 69B
1973	August 5	(Canada) Ric Forest	Brabham BT-35
1974	June 23	(United States) Tom Klausler	Lola T-360
1975	June 22	(Canada) Gilles Villeneuve	March 75B
1976	June 13	(Canada) Gilles Villeneuve	March 76B
1977	June 26	(United States) Bobby Rahal	March 77B

== See also ==
- List of auto racing tracks in Canada
- RCAF Station Gimli
- Gimli Industrial Park Airport
