= Atlantic Championship Series =

Auto racing championship held in North America

- Category: Open wheeled
- Country: United States; Canada
- Inaugural season: 1974
- Drivers: 24
- Teams: 12
- Constructors: Swift Engineering, Van Diemen, JDR, Photon, Firman, RALT
- Engine suppliers: Mazda; Toyota; Honda
- Drivers' champion: (United States) Dario Cangialosi
- Teams' champion: (United States) K-Hill Motorsports
- Official website: Atlantic Championship Series

The Atlantic Championship Series is an American open-wheel racing series with races throughout North America. It has previously been called Champ Car Atlantics, Toyota Atlantics (after its then engine supplier for sponsorship reasons), or just Atlantics.

The series began in 1974 as a professional version of the Sports Car Club of America's amateur Formula Atlantic classification and typically served as a stepping stone to the original Indy Lights series under Championship Auto Racing Teams (CART). After that series was ended in 2002, the Atlantic series became the official developmental series of CART successor Champ Car World Series until the merger of Champ Car with IndyCar in 2008. The series ran independently on 2009 under IMSA sanctioning but shut down following that season. Starting in 2012, the series was revived by Formula Race Promotions with SCCA Pro Racing sanctioning. FRP switched to USAC sanctioning in 2017, though in 2019 it returned to being sanctioned by SCCA Pro Racing.

== Series information ==
The Atlantics series is a developmental open-wheel racing series in North America, also called a "ladder series". In 2005, a new factor was announced to solidify this reputation as the last series in which a driver will compete before moving to Champ Car, or the highest levels of sports car racing such as American Le Mans. A US$2 million prize was announced for the winner of the 2006 racing season and future seasons, with the restriction that it can only be used towards the cost of racing in the Champ Car World Series. Simon Pagenaud became champion in 2006 and claimed the first such prize. He promptly moved to Champ Car in 2007 to race for Walker Racing.

The series champion for 2007, Raphael Matos, also won the $2 million prize towards a Champ Car ride. However, he elected not to accept it as he felt that without other sponsorship, he would be driving for a non-competitive team. Matos instead accepted an offer from the Andretti Green Racing team in the developmental Firestone Indy Lights Series instead, where he was promised the chance to race in the Indy 500 and a future ride in the IndyCar Series. 2007 runner-up Franck Perera, who finished on the podium eight times during the season and won three races ultimately signed to race with Champ Car team Conquest Racing. When Champ Car was purchased by IndyCar prior to the 2008 season, Conquest joined IndyCar with Perera.

As of 2009, the series offers an unrestricted $1 million prize to the season champion, $500,000 to the runner-up, and $250,000 to the third-place finisher on the season. These season rewards are part of total of $3 million in total prize money, which also features $50,000 for each race win, and other bonuses such as a monetary pole position reward.

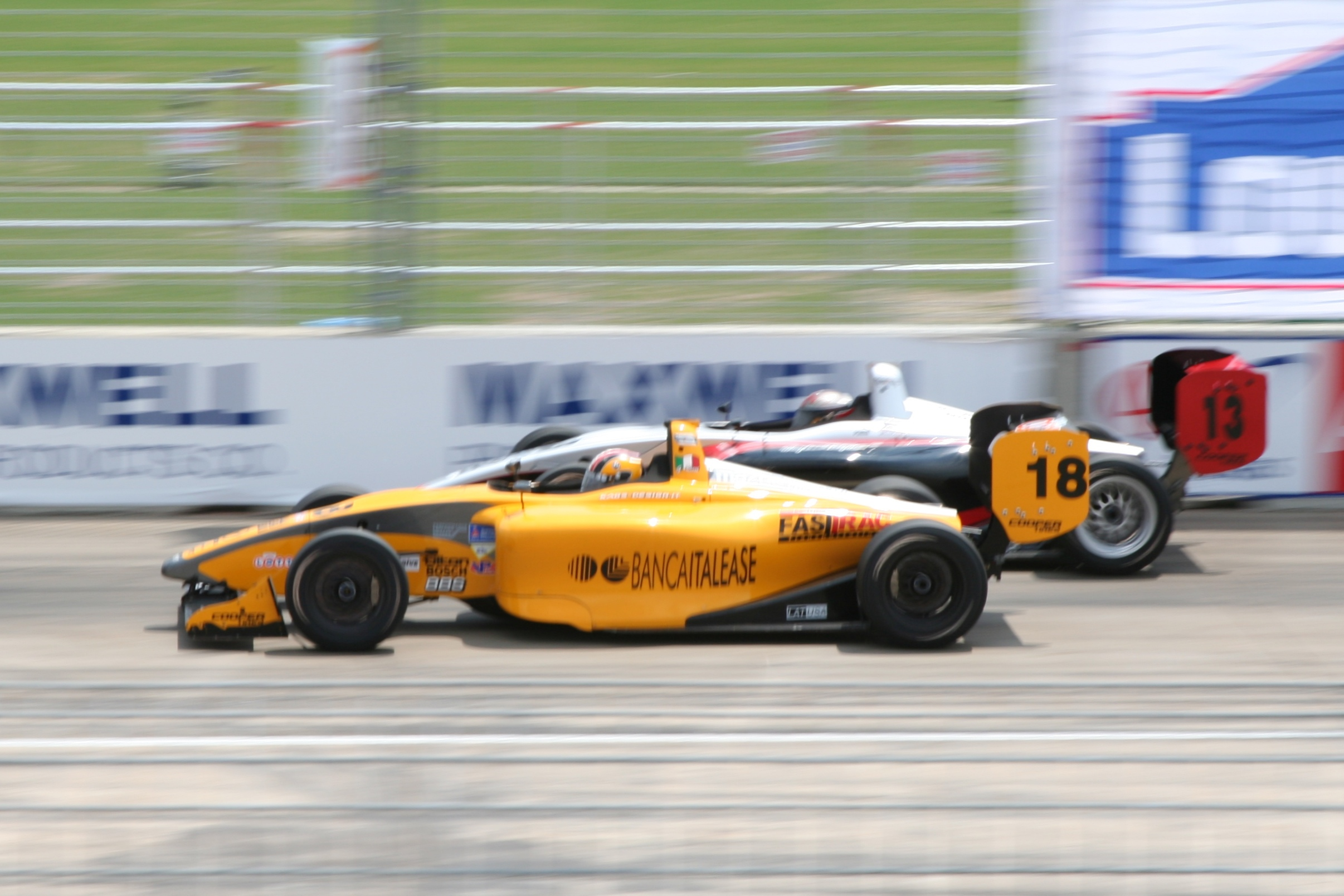
Giacomo Ricci (foreground) passing Frankie Muniz in their Swift 016.a machines during the 2007 Houston race.

=== Race equipment ===
Starting in 2006, the series has been run exclusively with Swift 016.a chassis powered by Mazda-Cosworth MZR 2300 cm^{3} (2.3 L) DOHC inline-4 engines producing 300 bhp (224 kW). The cars are capable of speeds in excess of 175 mph (280 km/h). The new formula has lowered the costs of running a full Atlantic season to around $500,000–$600,000. This reduction in costs, plus the addition of the aforementioned $2 million prize, had an immediate effect on increasing the number of competitors in the series (car count), which had dwindled over the previous few seasons. For example, the 2007 season featured 30 drivers.

Although the series had been run on Yokohama tires since 1991, the Japanese company elected to end its relationship with the series after the 2006 series, at which point it was replaced by Cooper Tire and became title sponsor for the series.

=== Specifications ===
- Chassis: Swift 016.a, Carbon-fibre composite with kevlar, two roll-over structures. No change of chassis during an event
- Engine Displacement: Cosworth Built Mazda 2,300 cc (2.3 L; 140.4 cu in) MZR DOHC I-4
- Gearbox: Swift 5 Speed Sequential Manual Transmission (must have reverse)
- Power Output: 300 hp (224 kW; 304 PS) @ 8000rpm
- Fuel: VP Racing Fuels 108 RON Leaded gasoline, no refueling (similar to Formula 3, GP2 Series, GP3 Series, Formula 1 and Formula Renaults)
- Fuel Tank: IMSA homologated rubber safety tank
- Fuel Delivery: Fuel injection
- Aspiration: Naturally aspirated
- Electronics/ECU: Cosworth Electronics Data: Pi Research Sigma/ECU - Pectel SQ6/Wiring - Performance Wiring Solutions wiring.
- Length: 4,500 mm (177 in)
- Width: 1,956 mm (77 in)
- Wheelbase: 2,776 mm (109 in)
- Weight: 643 kg (1,418 lb), with driver
- Steering: Manual, rack and pinion
- Drivetrain: 2WD only
- Brakes: Performance Friction Brakes
- Tires: Cooper Atlantic Championship racing slicks and rain tires
- Wheel rims: BBS
- Safety equipment: HANS device, Seat belt 6-point supplied by Willans
- Prohibitings: Active suspension, telemetry and traction control

== History ==
The history of Formula Atlantic begins with the Sports Car Club of America (SCCA) Formula B class, created in 1965 for single-seat formula cars with engines not exceeding 1600 cm^{3} in capacity. Prior to Formula Atlantic, professional Formula B races were held in the United States from 1965 to 1972, first with the SCCA's poorly supported Formula A, then as part of the SCCA Formula Continental Championship in 1968 (when they were largely overshadowed by the V8-powered Formula 5000 cars) and then as an independent series from 1969 to 1972.

Formula Atlantic as a class evolved in the United Kingdom in 1971 from the US Formula B rules, with 1600 cm^{3} production-based twin-cam engines (initially dominated by Lotus-Ford Twin Cam-based dry-sump Cosworth Mk.XIII, then by Cosworth BDD when the class became Atlantic in the United States, however other engines like Alfa Romeo and BMW were also eligible). Conceived by John Webb of Brands Hatch (who would later also develop the Sports 2000 class) as a category for national competitors with the performance near a Formula Two car but running costs at or below that of a contemporary Formula Three car. A single (Yellow Pages championship ran in 1971–72, with a rival BP backed series appearing in 1973. 1974 saw the BP series changing sponsor to John Player and the Yellow Pages series becoming backed by John Webb's MCD organisation and Southern Organs. In practice most top drivers competed in both series and there were no date clashes. Only one series ran in 1975–76, in the final year taking the title 'Indylantic and adopting Indianapolis-style single-car qualifying. But the formula was under threat from Formula 3 and no series ran in 1977–78. The series returned in 1979 with backing (for one season only) from Hitachi and continued to 1983, with diminishing grids and few new cars appearing.

As a result of its similarity to Formula 2 and Formula 3 in terms of chassis regulations, Formula Atlantic typically used chassis closely related to these cars — with performance somewhere in between the two — so most of the manufacturers were familiar from those classes, particularly the likes of Brabham, Lotus, March, Chevron early on, with Ralt and then Reynard later. US manufacturer Swift came to displace the British imports and dominate in North America. Several smaller marques also appeared.

The first professional races run under Formula Atlantic rules in North America were conducted in 1974 by the Canadian Automobile Sport Clubs (CASC) in Canada (now ASN Canada), drawing much attention and large fields due to its national CTV television coverage. IMSA in the United States took advantage of the large number of teams and organized its own series in 1976.

During these years, the series attracted guest drivers from Europe, including Formula One, particularly at the Trois-Rivières street race in Quebec, Canada. Guest drivers included James Hunt, Jean-Pierre Jarier, Riccardo Patrese, Patrick Depailler, Jacques Laffite, Didier Pironi and Vittorio Brambilla.

In 1977, the SCCA sanctioned the US events and in 1978 the CASC and SCCA series merged and conducted the series jointly until 1983, when it ran as the Formula Mondial North American Cup; Michael Andretti won the championship. The series could not sustain the success of earlier seasons and was cancelled for 1984.

In its place a "Pacific" series was conducted exclusively on the US West Coast in 1985. This rebirth expanded to an East Coast "Atlantic" series the following year and the two ran concurrently through 1990. From 1990 to 2005, the series was sponsored by Toyota and the cars were powered by 1600 cc Toyota 4A-GE engines available in kit form from Toyota Racing Development. With the support of Toyota, the two US series were reunited into a single North American championship and have remained so to this date.

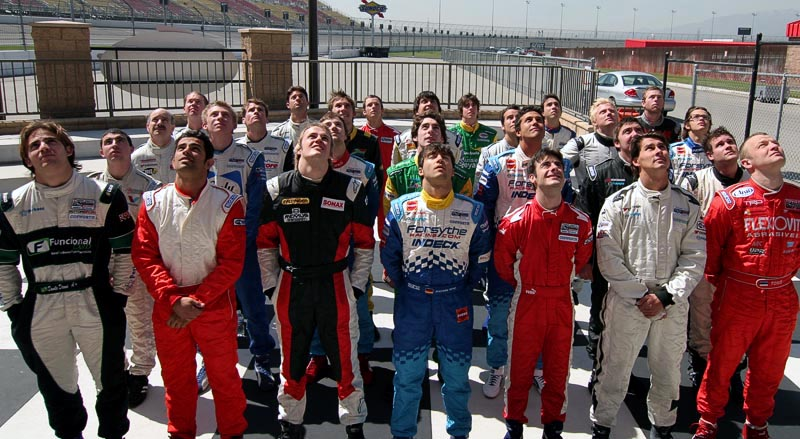
2006 Champ Car Atlantic Drivers pose for group photo at California Speedway

The same rules were adopted as Formula Pacific (not to be confused with the US Formula Atlantic Pacific Championship) and races were run in Australia and New Zealand, where Formula Pacific became the top class of racing. For a few years the prestigious Macau Grand Prix was run to Formula Pacific rules before becoming a Formula Three race. South Africa also adopted Formula Atlantic rules, but later mandated that the cars were fitted with Mazda Wankel engines.

In recognition of the global acceptance of the formula it was briefly renamed Formula Mondial in 1983, but this series failed to materialize.

Among Atlantic drivers in races through 1982 were Keke Rosberg, Gilles Villeneuve, Michael Andretti, Bobby Rahal, Howdy Holmes, Tom Gloy, Dave McMikllan, Kevin Cogan, Jacques Villeneuve Sr, Chris Kneifel and Roberto Moreno.

In 1983, Jon Norman, Gudrun and Rick Shea and Tim Fortner, formed West Coast Atlantic Racing - WCAR - and ran a series of professional races for Atlantic cars on the U.S. west coast, with Al Brizzard as Chief Steward. WCAR had originally sprung up with the FIA's "Formula Mondial" championship and when that folded prematurely, WCAR became Atlantic racing in the United States.

On the east coast, Vicki O'Connor decided to establish a similar series. Thus, East Coast Atlantic Racing - ECAR - was born. Simultaneously, Vicki established Pro-Motion Agency Ltd as the organizing and managing body to run the series and had SCCA as the sanctioning body.

The first ECAR race was at Summit Point Motorsports Park in West Virginia on 07 Jul 1985. Incidentally, this race and all subsequent Atlantic series races except those on ovals, used a series signature standing start following a group warm-up lap.

Both WCAR and ECAR ran races for a while until the two series were merged under Vicki's management in 1991.

Vicki brought to the management of the Atlantic series the many years of experience she'd accumulated while working for Carl Haas in his Lola, Hewland and other racing equipment import business, and more directly, her involvement in Carl's race team management in the CanAm and other series.

Vicki's biography as a member of the Road Racing Drivers Club reads in part "… the Toyota Atlantic Series which developed into the most successful and longest-running open-wheel driver development series in North America".

The Toyota Atlantic Series ran on road courses, ovals, street courses and airports in the United States, Canada and Mexico.

The success of the series brought it the sponsorship and engine development of Toyota Motor Corporation in 1989 under its North American competition division, Toyota Racing Development, led by Les Unger.

Later races were sanctioned by CART (Championship Auto Racing Teams) when CART bought Pro-Motion Agency Ltd. When Champ Car succeeded CART in 2004, the new owners also bought Pro-Motion Agency, and Toyota Atlantic continued under their sanctioning. The series ended with the bankruptcy of Champ Car in 2007.

The series raised to prominence a great number of drivers including Michael Andretti, Jacques Vlleneuve, Scott Goodyear, Joey Hand, Buddy Rice, Sam Hornish, Ryan Hunter-Reay, Brian Till, Dan Wheldon, Alex Tagliani, Calvin Fish, Danica Patrick, Simon Pagenaud, A. J. Allmendinger, Graham Rahal and Katherine Legge.

The latest in a long line of television celebrities to enter this series—starting with Dick Smothers at the very first race in 1968—was Frankie Muniz of the Fox Network comedy Malcolm in the Middle, making his debut in 2007. Sharing the dream of many American open wheel racers, Muniz stated his intention to use Champ Car Atlantics as a direct path to racing in the Champ Car World Series.

=== Women in the Atlantic Championship ===
A few women have chosen to participate in Atlantic racing under the Toyota Atlantic or Atlantic Championship powered by Mazda banner.

As mentioned in the list of former drivers, Danica Patrick was an Atlantic competitor in 2003 and 2004. She was the first woman to score a pole position in the series and the first woman to finish on the podium. She also led the 2004 season briefly before finishing third overall in season results, but did not score a win in two years of Atlantic competition.

Katherine Legge also competed in Atlantic for a season. In 2005, she became the first woman in history to win a professional open wheel race in North America, at Long Beach, California. She then amassed two more wins in the same season and finished third overall in season results.

Christal Waddy was the first African American female Motorsport Director in the United States for a professional motorsport team. In 2006 Christal campaigned a two car entry for car owner Bob Gelles of Gelles Racing sponsored by Western Union. Driver Robbie Pecorari won a race in Toronto, Canada and finished eleventh in points. Stephen Simpson competed in three races with his best finish of fifth place in Monterrey, Mexico. Christal was also the owner of sponsor Roadblock Protective Systems and Team Manager for BMW of Sterling Motorsports.

Simona de Silvestro was an Atlantic Championship contender who led a large portion 2009 Atlantic Championship season, ultimately finishing third. In three years in the series, she has bettered Katherine Legge's career mark of three wins, with one in 2008 and four in 2009.

=== Series ownership and sponsor commitments ===
On October 31, 2008, an official announcement was made that the Atlantic Championship series had been purchased by Ben Johnston, an Atlanta area businessman and one-time Atlantic racer. At the same time, Mazda and Cooper Tires also announced a continuing commitment to the series. Then, in 2009, Mazda recommitted its support to the Atlantic Championship by extending an engine contract that covers the series through the year 2011.

=== Current status ===
In early 2010, Atlantic Championship personnel publicized several features intended to attract new drivers and retain existing racers and teams. One was to brand the series as the "Road to F1", announcing that "at least one current European F1 team manager" would be in attendance to monitor a test for interested racers. Another was to announce prize money that would be paid directly to drivers, rather than to teams. Another press release listed teams that were committed to the series.

Despite these efforts, on March 3, 2010, series officials announced that the 2010 season had been put on hold. Robert Davis of Mazda North American Operations said: "All of us at Mazda are disappointed that the Atlantic Championship will be on hiatus this year." Series president Ben Johnston stated: "The Atlantic Championship office will be working during the down time in order to deliver an unparalleled racing offering when economic conditions allow."

On December 29, 2011, Mike Rand, Bob Wright and Al Guibord Jr. of Formula Race Promotions, which operates the F1600 and F2000 Championship Series sanctioned by the Sports Car Club of America's Pro Racing Division, announced the Atlantic Championship would be revived for the 2012 season with a schedule that will be held during three of their F1600 and F2000 series weekends - Road Atlanta (May 10–12), New Jersey Motorsports Park (June 28-July 1) and Summit Point Raceway (August 24–26). SCCA engine and chassis rules will apply and the cars will race exclusively on Hoosier tires.

On December 21, 2012, it was announced that the 2013 schedule had been suspended. On October 1, 2013, it was announced that the series would return in 2014 with a twelve race, six weekend race calendar.

For the 2017 Atlantic Championship, sanctioning transitioned from the SCCA to the United States Auto Club but Formula Race Promotions continued in their role as promoter. The series returned to SCCA sanctioning in 2019.

== Television and other video ==
Atlantic Championship races have previously been shown on multiple networks, including SPEED. For 2009, a new high-definition television package was announced on HDNet, which features live coverage of certain events and replays of others.

Web video of events has also historically been available on the series website, and the series also has its own official YouTube channel under the username "AtlanticRacingSeries."

== Champions ==
Season	Champion	Team Champion
Formula Atlantic
1974	(Canada) Bill Brack	
1975	(Canada) Bill Brack	(United States) Scott Racing
1976 CASC	(Canada) Gilles Villeneuve (CASC)	Ecurie Canada
1976 IMSA	(Canada) Gilles Villeneuve (IMSA)	Ecurie Canada
1977	(Canada) Gilles Villeneuve	Ecurie Canada
1978	(United States) Howdy Holmes	(United States) Shierson Racing
1979	(United States) Tom Gloy	(United States) Lane Racing
1980	(Canada) Jacques Villeneuve	
1981	(Canada) Jacques Villeneuve	
1982	(New Zealand) Dave McMillan	
1983	(United States) Michael Andretti	(United States) Conte Racing
1984 West	(United States) Dan Marvin (Pacific)	
1985 East	(United States) Michael Angus (Atlantic)	
1985 West	(United States) Jeff Wood (Pacific)	
1986 East	(Canada) Scott Goodyear (Atlantic)	
1986 West	(United States) Ted Prappas (Pacific)	
1987 East	(United Kingdom) Calvin Fish (Atlantic)	
1987 West	(United States) Johnny O'Connell (Pacific)	
1988 East	(United States) Steve Shelton (Atlantic)	
1988 West	(United States) Dean Hall (Pacific)	
Toyota Atlantic Championship
1989 East	(United States) Jocko Cunningham (Atlantic)	
1989 West	(Japan) Hiro Matsushita (Pacific)	
1990 East	(United States) Brian Till (Atlantic)	
1990 West	(United States) Mark Dismore (Pacific)	P-1 Racing
1991	(Philippines) Jovy Marcelo	P-1 Racing
1992	(United States) Chris Smith	
1993	(Canada) David Empringham	(Canada) Canaska Racing
1994	(Canada) David Empringham	
1995	(United States) Richie Hearn	
1996	(Canada) Patrick Carpentier	(United States) Lynx Racing
1997	(United States) Alex Barron	(United States) Lynx Racing
1998	(Canada) Lee Bentham	(United States) Forsythe Racing
1999	(United States) Anthony Lazzaro	(United States) PPI Motorsports
2000	(United States) Buddy Rice	(United States) DSTP Motorsports
2001	(Brazil) Hoover Orsi	(United States) P-1 Racing
2002	(United States) Jon Fogarty	(United States) Dorricott Racing
2003	(United States) A. J. Allmendinger	(United States) RuSPORT
2004	(United States) Jon Fogarty	(United States) Sierra Sierra Racing
2005	(Netherlands) Charles Zwolsman Jr.	(United States) Condor Motorsports
Champ Car Atlantic
2006	(France) Simon Pagenaud	(United States) Team Australia
2007	(Brazil) Raphael Matos	(United States) Sierra Sierra Enterprises
Atlantic Championship
2008	(Finland) Markus Niemelä	(United States) Brooks Associates Racing
2009	(United States) John Edwards	(United States) Newman Wachs Racing
SCCA Pro Racing Atlantic Championship Series
2012	(United States) David Grant	(United States) Polestar Racing Group
2013	season not contested	
2014	(Canada) Daniel Burkett	(United States) K-Hill Motorsports
2015	(United States) Keith Grant	(United States) Polestar Racing Group
2016	(United States) Ryan Norman	(United States) Polestar Racing Group
Atlantic Championship Series (sanctioned by USAC)
2017	(United States) Peter Portante	(United States) K-Hill Motorsports
2018	(Argentina) Baltazar Leguizamón	(United States) K-Hill Motorsports
Atlantic Championship Series (sanctioned by SCCA Pro Racing)
2019	(United States) Dario Cangialosi	(United States) K-Hill Motorsports
2020	(United States) Keith Grant	
2021	(United States) Dudley Fleck	
2022	(United States) Keith Grant	
2023	(United States) Jimmy Simpson	
2024	(United States) Matthew Butson	
2025	(United States) John McAleer	

== See also ==
- Formula 3000
- Formula Three
  - FIA Formula 3
- Indy NXT
- Super Formula Lights
