= 1976 Formula Atlantic season IMSA =

1976 Formula Atlantic IMSA season

Seasons
- ← 1975 1977 →

The 1976 IMSA Formula Atlantic Players Championship Series season was contested over 6 rounds. In this one-make engine formula all drivers had to use Ford engines.

== Calendar ==
| Race No | Track | State | Date | Laps | Distance | Time | Speed | Winner | Pole position | Fastest race lap |
|---|---|---|---|---|---|---|---|---|---|---|
| 1 | Road Atlanta | Georgia | April 11, 1976 | 40 | 4.055436=162.21744 km | 0'55:20.907 | 175.850 km/h | Gilles Villeneuve | ? | Gilles Villeneuve |
| 2 | Monterey | California | May 2, 1976 | 33 | 3.05767=100.90311 km | 0'35:29.418 | 170.587 km/h | Gilles Villeneuve | ? | Elliott Forbes-Robinson |
| 3 | Ontario | California | May 9, 1976 | 26 | 4.667=121.342 km | 0'42:24.553 | 171.673 km/h | Gilles Villeneuve | ? | Gilles Villeneuve |
| 4 | Lexington | Ohio | August 29, 1976 | 42 | 3.86232=162.21744 km | 1'02:26.053 | 155.893 km/h | Tom Klausler | ? | Tom Klausler |
| 5 | Road Atlanta | Georgia | September 19, 1976 | 25 | 4.055436=101.3859 km | 0'34:23.261 | 176.899 km/h | Gilles Villeneuve | ? | Gilles Villeneuve; Howdy Holmes |
| 6 | Monterey | California | October 3, 1976 | 33 | 3.05767=100.90311 km | 0'35:06.81 | 172.418 km/h | Price Cobb | ? | Bobby Rahal |

== Final points standings ==
=== Driver ===
For every race the points were awarded: 20 points to the winner, 15 for runner-up, ?

| Place | Name | Country | Team | Chassis | Total points | (United States) | (United States) | (United States) | (United States) | (United States) | (United States) |
|---|---|---|---|---|---|---|---|---|---|---|---|
| 1 | Gilles Villeneuve | Canada | Ecurie Canada | March | 80 | 20 | 20 | 20 | - | 20 | - |
| 2 | Price Cobb | United States | Doug Shierson Racing | March | 45 | - | - | 8 | 15 | 2 | 20 |
| 3 | Elliott Forbes-Robinson | United States | ? | Tui | 45 | - | 15 | 15 | - | - | 15 |
| 4 | Bobby Brown | United States | ? | Chevron | 41 | 12 | 10 | - | 6 | 1 | 12 |
| 5 | Tom Klausler | United States | ? | Lola | 38 | 3 | - | - | 20 | 12 | 3 |
| 6 | Johnny Gerber | Mexico | ? | Chevron | 22 | - | 12 | 10 | - | - | - |
| 7 | Bobby Rahal | United States | ? | March | 20 | - | 8 | - | 12 | - | - |
| 8 | Don Breidenbach | United States | ? | March | 18 | 8 | - | - | - | - | 10 |
| 9 | Héctor Rebaque | Mexico | ? | Lola | 16 | - | 6 | - | - | 10 | - |
| 10 | Tom Pumpelly | United States | ? | March | 15 | 15 | - | - | - | - | - |
| | Tom Gloy | United States | ? | Tui | 15 | - | - | - | - | 15 | - |
| | Wink Bancroft | United States | ? | Chevron | 15 | 2 | - | 6 | 1 | - | 6 |
| 13 | Howdy Holmes | United States | ? | ? | 13 | - | - | - | 10 | 3 | - |
| 14 | Bill Brack | United States | ? | ? | 12 | - | - | 12 | - | - | - |
| | Carl Liebich | United States | ? | ? | 12 | 6 | 4 | - | 2 | - | - |
| 16 | Tim Cooper | United States | ? | ? | 11 | 1 | 2 | 4 | - | 4 | - |
| 17 | Tom Bagley | United States | ? | ? | 10 | 10 | - | - | - | - | - |
| 18 | James King | United States | ? | ? | 8 | - | - | - | 8 | - | - |
| | John Mortensen | United States | ? | ? | 8 | - | - | - | - | 8 | - |
| | Dan Marvin | United States | ? | ? | 8 | - | - | - | - | - | 8 |
| 21 | Chip Mead | United States | ? | ? | 6 | - | - | 2 | 4 | - | - |
| | Marcel Talbot | Canada | ? | Chevron | 6 | - | - | - | - | 6 | - |
| 23 | Cliff Hansen | United States | Doug Shierson Racing | March | 4 | 4 | - | - | - | - | - |
| | Kevin Cogan | United States | ? | Ralt | 4 | - | - | - | - | - | 4 |
| 25 | Richard Melville | United States | Wilbur Bunce Racing | Lola | 3 | - | 3 | - | - | - | - |
| | Dick Hayes | United States | ? | Chevron | 3 | - | - | 3 | - | - | - |
| | Tom Outcault | United States | ? | March | 3 | - | - | - | 3 | - | - |
| 28 | Tim Coconis | United States | ? | Lola | 2 | - | - | - | - | - | 2 |
| 29 | Gordon Strom | United States | ? | Chevron | 1 | - | 1 | - | - | - | - |
| | Pete Halsmer | United States | ? | Brabham | 1 | - | - | 1 | - | - | - |
| | Jon Norman | United States | ? | Lotus | 1 | - | - | - | - | - | 1 |
