= 1974 Formula Atlantic season =

- CASC Player's Challenge Series

Season
- Races: 7
- Start date: May 26
- End date: August 18

Awards
- Drivers' champion: (Canada) Bill Brack

The 1974 CASC Player's Challenge Series was a motorsport championship in Canada run to Formula Atlantic regulations. Canadian Bill Brack won the championship.

== Calendar ==
Rnd	Date	Circuit	City/Location	Winning driver
1	May 26	(British Columbia) Westwood Motorsport Park	Coquitlam, British Columbia	(United States) Allan Lader
2	June 2	(Alberta) Edmonton International Speedway	Edmonton, Alberta	(Canada) Bill Brack
3	June 16	(Manitoba) Gimli Motorsports Park	Gimli, Manitoba	(United States) Tom Klausler
4	July 2	(Ontario) Mosport Park	Bowmanville, Ontario	(Canada) Bill Brack
5	July 14	(Quebec) Sanair Super Speedway	Saint-Pie, Quebec	(Canada) Bill Brack
6	July 27	(Newfoundland and Labrador) St. John's Street Circuit	St. John's, Newfoundland	(United States) Tom Klausler
7	August 18	(Nova Scotia) Atlantic Motorsport Park	Halifax, Nova Scotia	(Canada) Bill Brack
NC	September 1	(Quebec) Circuit Trois-Rivières	Trois-Rivières, Quebec	(United States) Tom Klausler

== Points standings ==
Pos	Driver	Chassis	(British Columbia) WES	(Alberta) EDM	(Manitoba) GIM	(Ontario) MOS	(Quebec) SAN	(Newfoundland and Labrador) STJ	(Nova Scotia) HAL	(Quebec) TRV	Points
1	Bill Brack	Lotus 59	Ret	1	Ret	1	1	8		Ret	128
1	Bill Brack	Chevron B27							1		128
2	Tom Klausler	Lola T360			1	3	3	1	3	1	117
3	Wink Bancroft	Chevron B27	5	13	3	4	6	6	11	13	74
4	Bobby Brown	Chevron B27				Ret	5	Ret	2	DNS	72
4	Bobby Brown	March 74B	2	5	Ret						72
5	Bertil Roos	Chevron B27	Ret	4	Ret	2	2				63
6	Bruce Jensen	March 74B	Ret	2	6	12	Ret	Ret	5	5	55
7	James King	Chevron B27	10	6	9	DNS	8	3	Ret	4	50
8	Craig Hill	Brabham BT40	Ret	7	2	DNS	Ret	4	Ret	Ret	48
9	Chip Mead	Chevron B27	Ret	Ret	13	6	7	7	7	7	40
10	Howdy Holmes	Chevron B27						2	4		39
11	Al Justason	Rondel M1	8	14	10	8	11	15	10	10	36
12	Syd Demovsky	March 74B	7	9		7	DNS	Ret	6		35
12	Syd Demovsky	March 742								Ret	35
13	Allan Lader	Chevron B27	1								30
14	Dave Morris	March 74B	Ret	3	8	Ret					29
15	Peter Ferguson	Chevron B20	12	11	4	Ret	Ret	12	Ret	DNQ	28
16	Gilles Villeneuve	March 74B	3	Ret	18	15			9	Ret	27
17	Charles Gibson	March 73B				5	4	DNS	DNS	Ret	27
18	Peter Broeker	Chevron B9/B17	13	15						16	26
18	Peter Broeker	Chevron B27			11	13	DNS	10	8		26
19	Tim Cooper	March 73B	9	8	14	Ret		9			24
20	David Loring	Merlyn Mk21	4	Ret	15						23
20	David Loring	March 74B				Ret	9	Ret			23
21	Bill Eagles	Brabham BT40	DNQ	10	5	Ret	DNQ	Ret	13	DNQ	21
22	Chris O'Brien	Rondel M1	Ret	Ret	7	Ret		DNS	Ret	18	13
23	Hugh Cree	Brabham BT35			12	10	Ret	13			13
24	Richard Melville	Chevron B27						5			12
25	Allen Karlberg	Brabham BT29	6								10
26	Joe Grimaldi	March 74B	11	12							9
27	Michael Bystrom	Brabham BT38				9				Ret	7
28	Reg Scullion	Brabham BT38				Ret	10				6
28	Reg Scullion	March 74B								6	6
29	Joe Shepherd	Chevron B20		Ret	DNQ	11	DNS			DNS	5
30	Mike Hall	Brabham BT40				Ret	12			17	4
31	Seb Barone	Rondel M1	DNS	17	DNQ	16				Ret	3
31	Seb Barone	March 74B					13				3
32	Ron Cohn	March 74B					DNS				2
32	Ron Cohn	March 73B							14	11	2
33	Mauro Lanaro	March 71BM	DNS	19	DNQ	DNQ	14	Ret	DNS		2
34	Fred Beyer	Brabham BT35			DNQ	DNQ	Ret	14	20		2
35	Frank Del Vecchio	March 73B				14	Ret				2
36	Gilles Léger	March 74B				DNQ	15				1
37	Bill O'Connor	Lola T360			16	Ret	Ret		Ret	8	0
38	Chuck Hansen	March 74B		16			Ret				0
39	Richard Doran	GRD B72	DNQ								0
39	Richard Doran	GRD 272		18							0
39	Richard Doran	GRD 72B								Ret	0
40	David Fram	Brabham BT40							21		0
—	Len Campbell	March 73B	Ret	Ret		DNQ					0
—	Dennis Krueger	March 71BM	Ret								0
—	George Sabin	Chevron B27		Ret							0
—	Ron Householder	Brabham BT40	DNQ	Ret							0
—	Ric Forest	March 73B			DNS	Ret	Ret			15	0
—	Richard Paul	March 74B				Ret	Ret	DNS			0
—	Luke de Sadeleer	March 73B				DNS					0
—	Gary Magwood	March 73B					Ret				0
—	Gary Magwood	Lola T360						Ret	Ret	Ret	0
—	George MacDonald	McLaren M4B						Ret			0
—	Roger Seacrist	Rondel M1					DNS			Ret	0
—	Bruce MacInnes	March 73B							DNS	Ret	0
—	Norm Joy	March 71BM	DNQ			DNQ					0
—	Ron Rogers	unknown					DNQ				0
—	Scott McKenzie	unknown					DNQ				0
—	Jean-Pierre Jaussaud	Chevron B27								2	0
—	Patrick Depailler	March 74B								3	0
—	Price Cobb	Chevron B20								9	0
—	David Westgate	March 71BM								12	0
—	Bob Beyea	Brabham BT40								14	0
—	Chris Gleason	Brabham BT-40								Ret	0
—	George Follmer	March 74B								Ret	0
—	Tom Pryce	Chevron B27								Ret	0
—	Don Breidenbach	March 74B								DNS	0
—	William Prout, Jr.	March 705								DNQ	0
