= Sunfest =

Sunfest is the name used for several music and art festivals:

- SunFest, West Palm Beach, Florida
- Sunfest (London, Ontario)
- Sunfest, Bartlesville, Oklahoma
- Sunfest, Bucharest, Romania
- Sunfest (Gimli, Manitoba)
