= Gimli Industrial Park Airport =

Airport in Manitoba, Canada

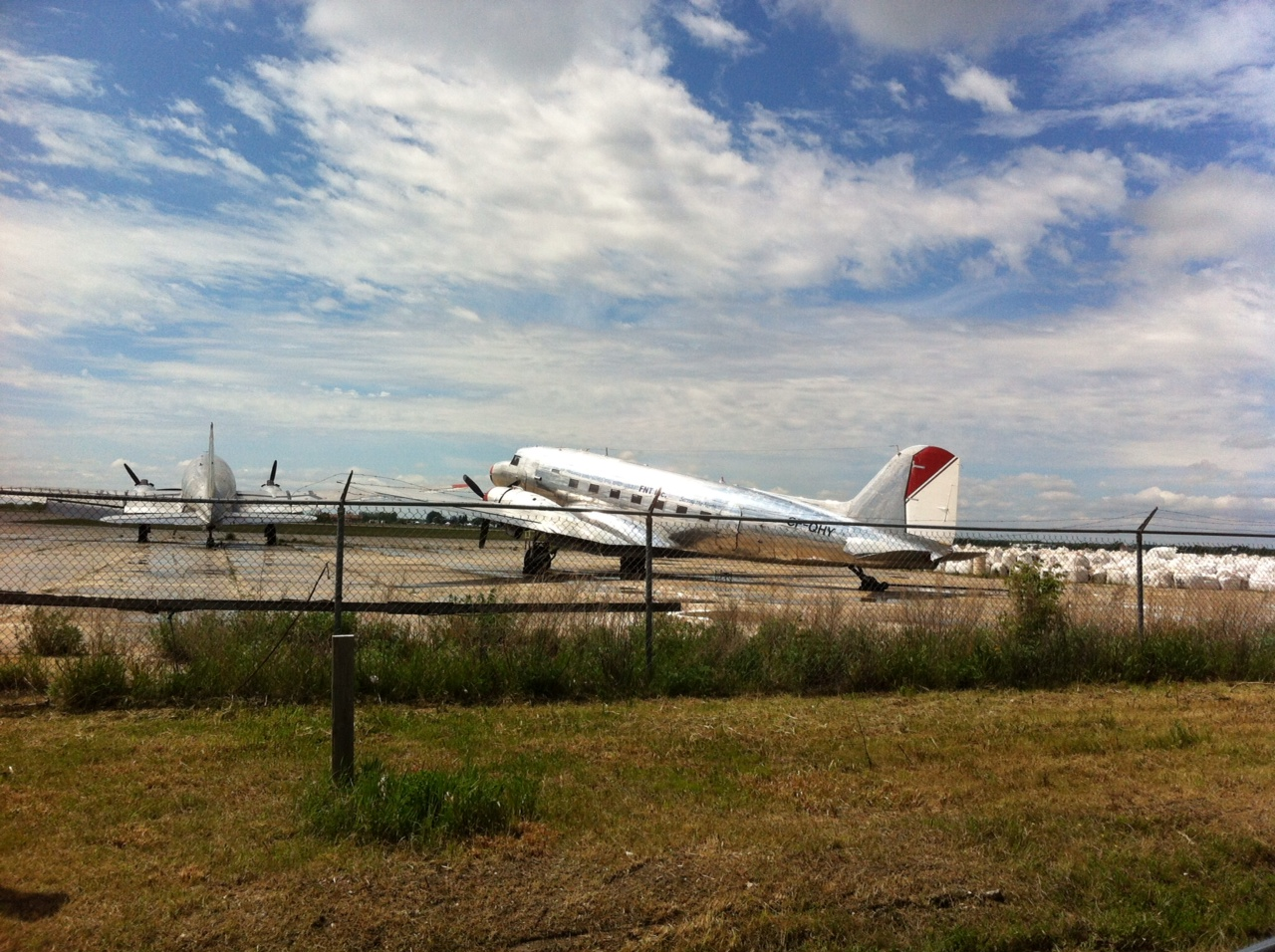
- Gimli Industrial Park Airport in 2012
- IATA: YGM; ICAO: CYGM

Summary
- Airport type: Public
- Operator: Rural Municipality of Gimli
- Location: Gimli RM, near Gimli, Manitoba
- Time zone: CST (UTC−06:00)
  - Summer (DST): CDT (UTC−05:00)
- Elevation AMSL: 752 ft / 229 m
- Coordinates: 50°37′41″N 097°02′36″W

Map
- Location in Manitoba CYGM (Canada)

Runways
| Direction | Length | | Surface |
| Direction | ft | m | Surface |
|---|---|---|---|
| 15/33 | 6,800 | 2,073 | Asphalt |
- Source: Canada Flight Supplement

Gimli Industrial Park Airport (IATA: YGM, ICAO: CYGM) is a civilian airport and former military field located 2 nautical miles (3.7 km; 2.3 mi) west of Gimli, Manitoba, Canada.

It now operates as a civilian airport, with one of the original parallel runways decommissioned and now a significant portion of Gimli Motorsports Park. Flying-related activities here include use by the Manitoba government's water bomber squadron, the Gimli Cadet Flying Site, 182 GM Stefnusfastur Squadron - Royal Canadian Air Cadets, Interlake Aviation flight school and charter service, and Prairie Helicopters - a helicopter charter and training company. Gimli is also used by No. 435 Transport and Rescue Squadron based out of No. 17 Wing Winnipeg, for training purposes, and as a skydive drop zone by Skydive Manitoba. In recent summers, the airport hosted glider pilot training for air cadets as Regional Gliding School (Northwest).

== History ==
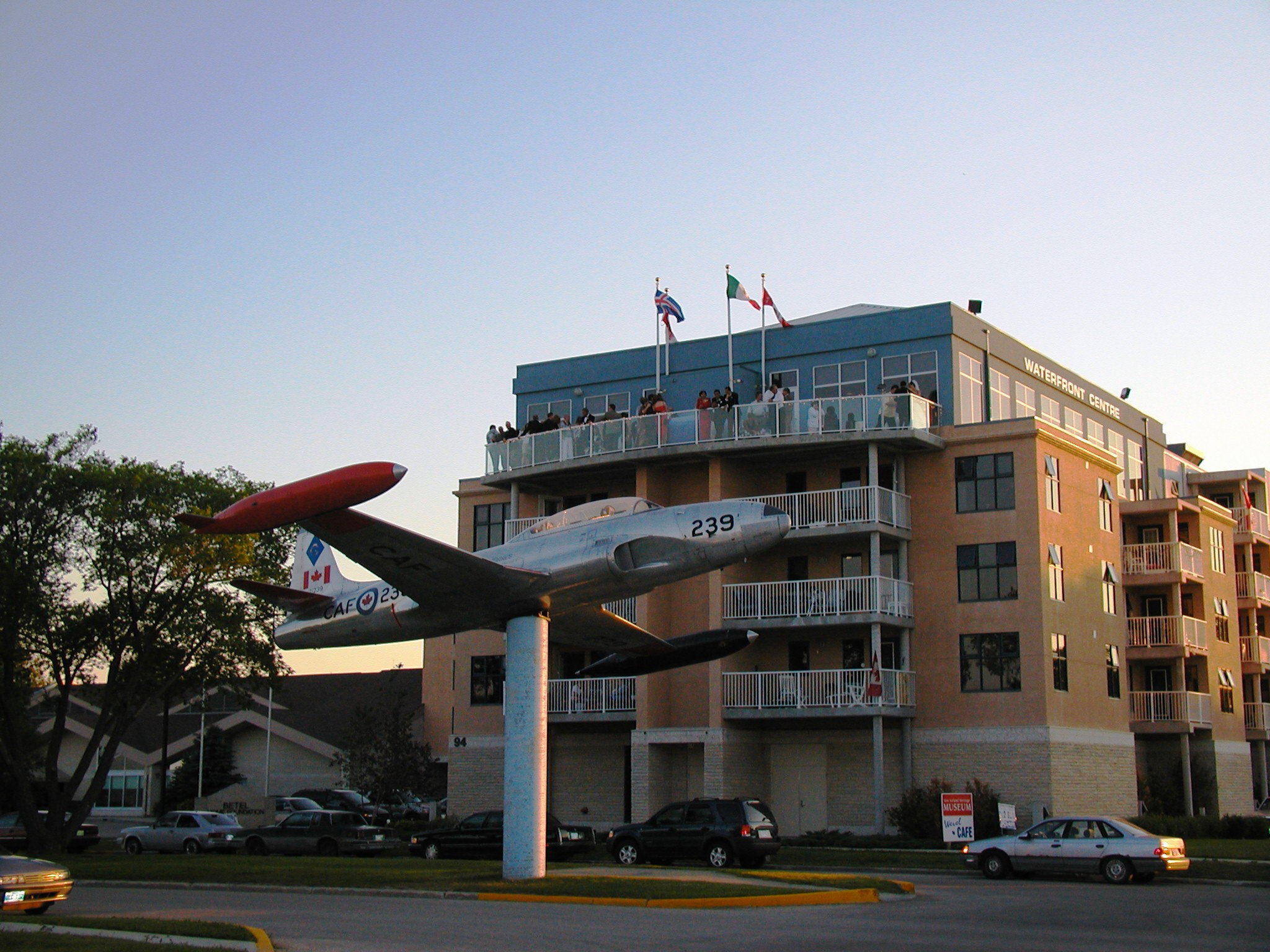
Betel Waterfront, T-33 Training Plane

Opened as RCAF Station Gimli, the airfield served during World War II as the home of Service Flying Training School #18 under the British Commonwealth Air Training Plan. The station closed in September 1971 and the airport was used for civilian activities.

== Tenants ==
- Gimli Motorsports Park
- Gimli Cadet Flight Training Centre
- 182 GM Stefnusfastur Squadron - Royal Canadian Air Cadets
- Skydive Manitoba
- Prairie Helicopters Incorporated
- Interlake Aviation Flight School & Charter Service

== Incidents and accidents ==
=== Gimli Glider ===
In 1983, the airport became famous when a Boeing 767 (C-GAUN) of Air Canada ran out of fuel over southern Manitoba and successfully glided to a landing at Gimli Motorsports Park. There were no serious injuries. The aircraft in the incident became popularly referred to as the Gimli Glider.

=== DHC-4 crash ===
Three people were killed on August 27, 1992 when a NewCal Aviation turbine-modified de Havilland Canada DHC-4 Caribou they were aboard crashed on the airfield during climb-out after a short take-off from the airport. The aircraft nosed sharply up, arced right and nosed into the ground. Although there was no explosion, a fire started and consumed the aircraft's remains. The cause was listed as failure to deactivate the plane's gust lock control in the cockpit, which was interlocked into the throttles when the plane was powered by radial piston engines. This feature was defeated in the plane's conversion to turboprop.

== See also ==
- List of airports in Manitoba
