= Falling from the Sky: Flight 174 =

Drama about the "Gimli Glider" air incident

- Genre: Drama
- Based on: Freefall: From 41,000 feet to Zero - A True Story by William Hoffer and Marilyn Hoffer
- Written by: Lionel Chetwynd
- Directed by: Jorge Montesi
- Starring: William Devane; Scott Hylands; Shelley Hack
- Music by: Ian Thomas
- Countries of origin: Canada; United States
- Original language: English

Production
- Executive producers: Joel Fields; Ronald H. Gilbert; Leonard Hill
- Producers: Lisa Richardson; Tom Rowe
- Production locations: Vancouver; Montréal
- Cinematography: David Geddes
- Editor: George Appleby
- Running time: 90 minutes
- Production companies: Hill/Fields Entertainment; Pacific Motion Pictures

Original release
- Network: ABC
- Release: February 20, 1995

Falling from the Sky: Flight 174 (also known as Freefall: Flight 174) is a 1995 Canadian thriller film directed by Jorge Montesi. Based on the events of Air Canada Flight 143, the film stars William Devane, Scott Hylands, Shelley Hack and Mariette Hartley. Set in 1983, the film follows the crew, their families and the passengers of the flight, from the preparations for departure to the emergency landing on an abandoned airfield in Manitoba, and everything in between.

== Plot ==
In a flight simulator, two airline pilots are given a scenario in which the plane experiences a sudden and complete loss of power, causing it to crash. When they protest that such a scenario could never happen, the examiner tells them, "It isn't a dream. It happened."( (Note: The examiner is played by Robert Pearson, the actual pilot of the "Gimli Glider".))

Two years earlier, on July 23, 1983, at Dorval Airport in Montreal, the ground crew of Canada World Airways struggles to convert gallons into liters and pounds into kilograms as they prepare to refuel a brand-new Boeing 767 bound for Edmonton. This is the first aircraft in the fleet to use the metric system and their unfamiliarity causes them to make a conversion error. Meanwhile, Beth Pearson (Mariette Hartley) drives her husband, Captain Robert Pearson (William Devane), to the airport, unusually anxious about hosting her in-laws later that day. In Montréal, First Officer Maurice Quintal (Scott Hylands) reluctantly agrees to cover for an injured colleague, leaving behind his terminally ill wife.

The two airmen feel uneasy about their 767 having an inoperative fuel gauge but are reassured to see the ground crew measuring the quantity of fuel in the tanks: 20,345 kg (or so they believe), more than enough to take them to Edmonton. Their Flight Management Computer will constantly indicate the quantity on board. After a delay, the passengers board flight 174, including Rick Dion (Winston Rekert), the airline's chief mechanic, as well as his wife and three-year-old boy.

After takeoff, Dion visits the pilots the flight deck. Their conversation is suddenly interrupted by a series of beeps indicating a failure in one of the fuel pumps. After activating the cross-feeding valve between the tanks, the alarm stops. Another pump failure is signaled and the crew realizes that their problem is not with the fuel pumps. Quintal checks the notepad used by the ground crew in Montréal and discovers they loaded 20,345 pounds (instead of kilograms) of fuel, less than half what they should have.

Pearson decides to divert to Winnipeg. The 767 is still far from that airport when another alarm sounds, indicating they are nearly out of fuel. It is followed by the failure of the two engines and the complete shutdown of all instruments. The aircraft disappears from the radar screens of air traffic controllers, who cannot communicate with the pilots. The captain instructs the cabin crew to busy passengers with an emergency drill to keep them calm, but it becomes apparent to everyone how serious their situation is. Fortunately, a ram air turbine kicks in, restoring instruments, communications, and limited hydraulic power.

In a stroke of good fortune, Captain Pearson is a former glider pilot who has performed many deadstick landings. Quintal remembers there is a closer, unused airfield in Gimli and the crew decides to land there instead of Winnipeg. Pearson sideslips the plane to lose altitude. The crew briefly contemplates ditching in a lake before finally spotting the airfield. Pearson tells Quintal to lower the landing gear to create drag and further reduce their speed so they don't overshoot, but the nose gear fails to lock. Unknown to them, the airfield's abandoned runway is being used by a car rally, which they have to dodge. Despite the nose gear collapsing on landing, the pilots manage to stop their aircraft within a few meters of the end of the runway. As passengers evacuate, the pilots use extinguishers to fight a fire in the cockpit. Everyone survives.

== Cast ==
- William Devane as Captain Robert Pearson
- Scott Hylands as First Officer Maurice Quintal
- Shelley Hack as Flight Attendant Lynn Brown
- Kevin McNulty as Senior Flight Attendant Larry Roberts
- Gwynyth Walsh as Pearl Dion
- Suzy Joachim as Flight Attendant Florence Bisaillon
- Nicholas Turturro as Air traffic controller Al Williams
- Winston Rekert as Rick Dion
- Mariette Hartley as Beth Pearson
- Joel Palmer as Chris Dion
- Philip Granger as Phil Lyons
- John Novak as Len Daniels
- Jeremy Wilkin as James Nolan
- Molly Parker as Norma Sax
- Fulvio Cecere as Simulator Co-Pilot
- Wendy Van Riesen as Marie Quintal
- Tom Butler as Pilot Dave
- Fred Henderson as Simulator Pilot
- Callum Rennie as Pumper

== Production ==
A combination of live action and CGI was used to depict the flight of the "Gimli Glider".

Falling from the Sky: Flight 174 was based on Freefall: From 41,000 feet to Zero - A True Story by William and Marilyn Hoffer. Although retaining the real names of three key individuals: Pilots Bob Pearson and Maurice Quintal and Air Canada Maintenance Engineer and passenger Rick Dion, along with their families, the names of the other people and the airline and the flight number were changed. The aircraft in the flying sequences is a Boeing 767 airliner, but interior scenes were shot using a Boeing 747 mock-up.

Captain Robert Pearson, the pilot of Air Canada Flight 143 on which the film is based on, makes a cameo appearance at the start of the film as the flight simulator instructor telling the 2 pilots that the scenario they just failed has happened before.

== Reception ==
Falling from the Sky: Flight 174 received mixed reviews. Film reviewer Hal Erickson said: "Although the actual story has enough inherent drama for five TV movies, the producers felt the necessity to add a few overly melodramatic touches to heighten the suspense; also, aviation enthusiasts weren't too happy with the script's inaccuracies, nor were movie purists impressed by the surprisingly shoddy computer enhanced special effects. Nonetheless, the film boasts excellent performances, especially from William Devane as Captain Bob Pearson."

Todd Everett felt similarly in his review for Variety: "Though based on a real-life event, this air crash drama shows little suspense. Cast, heavy on unknown Canadians, lacks star value of various "Airport" and airplane-terror films; still, 'Falling From the Sky! Flight 174' shows canny instincts from network execs counterprogramming NBC's female-oriented 'A Woman of Independent Means' and, for that matter, CBS's Monday comedy bloc."
