= RCAF Station Gimli =

Former air station in Manitoba, Canada

CFB Gimli
- Near Gimli, Manitoba in Canada

Site information
- Owner: Department of National Defence
- Operator: RCAF (1943–1968); CAF (1968–1971)

Location
- Coordinates: 50°37′41″N 97°02′36″W

Site history
- In use: 1943–1945, 1950–1971
- Fate: Turned over to RM of Gimli

Garrison information
- Occupants: No. 18 SFTS (1943–1945); No. 2 FTS; No. 3 AFS (1950−1964); No. 1 AFTS (1964–1971)

Airfield information
- Elevation: 753 ft (230 m) AMSL
Runways
Direction	Length and surface
14L/32R	6,858 ft (2,090 m) Asphalt
15R/33L	6,788 ft (2,069 m) Asphalt
- Other airfield facilities: Elevation and coordinates from COPA.

RCAF Station Gimli was an air station of the Royal Canadian Air Force (RCAF) located near Gimli, Manitoba, Canada.

== World War II (1943–1945) ==
On September 6, 1943, the British Commonwealth Air Training Plan established the No. 18 Service Flying Training School (No. 18 SFTS) to train aircrew for Second World War operations using the Avro Anson. No. 18 SFTS ceased operation on May 30, 1945.

=== Aerodrome data c.1942 ===
In approximately 1942, the aerodrome was listed at 50°38′N 97°03′W with a Var. 10 degrees E and elevation of 760 ft (230 m). Six runways were listed as under construction and detailed as follows:

Runway Name	Length	Width	Surface
3L/21R	4,200 ft (1,300 m)	100 ft (30 m)	Hard surfaced
3R/21L	4,100 ft (1,200 m)	100 ft (30 m)	Hard surfaced
15L/33R	4,300 ft (1,300 m)	100 ft (30 m)	Hard surfaced
15R/33L	3,800 ft (1,200 m)	100 ft (30 m)	Hard surfaced
9L/27R	4,800 ft (1,500 m)	100 ft (30 m)	Hard surfaced
9R/27L	4,800 ft (1,500 m)	100 ft (30 m)	Hard surfaced

=== Relief landing field – Netley, MB (1942) ===
The only Relief Landing field for RCAF Station Gimli was located approximately 10 miles south on the west side of the hamlet of Netley, Manitoba. The Relief field was constructed in the typical triangular pattern. In approximately 1942, the aerodrome was listed at 50°22′N 96°59′W with a Var. 10 degrees E and elevation of 750 ft (230 m). Three runways were listed as under construction and detailed as follows:

Runway Name	Length	Width	Surface
14/32	4,300 ft (1,300 m)	150 ft (46 m)	Hard surfaced
8/26	5,200 ft (1,600 m)	150 ft (46 m)	Hard surfaced
2/20	4,200 ft (1,300 m)	150 ft (46 m)	Hard surfaced

== Cold War (1950–1971) ==
During the Cold War period, many Second World War air stations were reactivated. Gimli was one of these, reopening in 1950 to become a jet aircraft training station. Flying training schools located here include No. 2 Flying Training School, No. 3 Advanced Flying School (redesignated in 1964 to No. 1 Flying Training School), and No. 1 Advanced Flying Training School. Married Quarters were built on the base at some point during this period. The former married Quarters are now the community of Aspen Park. At some point after the Base was reopened, the runways were reconfigured from the 6 runway triangular pattern to 2 longer, roughly parallel, asphalt surfaces. After unification of the three services in 1968, RCAF Station Gimli became a Canadian Forces Base (CFB). CFB Gimli closed in September 1971, and the flying schools moved to other Canadian forces bases.

== Post closure ==
Part of the aerodrome is now used as an industrial park and a racetrack, while another section continues operation as the Gimli Industrial Park Airport. Flying related activities include use by the Manitoba Provincial Government water bomber squadron, the Regional Gliding School (Northwest), and two private flying schools. Gimli is also used by No. 435 Transport and Rescue Squadron, based at 17 Wing Winnipeg, for training purposes.

== Air Canada Flight 143 (Gimli Glider) ==
The Gimli airfield became the focus of international attention on July 23, 1983, when Air Canada Flight 143 made an emergency landing there after a 17-minute powerless glide due to fuel exhaustion. On that day, the runways were being used for race-car activities on "Family Day" for the Sports Car club from Winnipeg. Flight 143's captain executed a sideslip before touching down on the runway, which increased drag and caused the airplane to quickly reduce speed and lose altitude. The impact with the ground was minimized by the maneuver, and none of the 69 people on board the Boeing 767 aircraft were seriously injured. While the sideslip is commonly used with gliders and light aircraft, this execution was the first with a commercial aircraft.

== See also ==
- Gimli Industrial Park Airport
- Gimli Motorsports Park
