= Willans (company) =

British company which provides safety harnesses

Willans is a British-based safety harness provider.

== History ==
Willans were founded in England in 1967 and has provided safety equipment to top motor sport teams in Formula One, NASCAR, the Indy Racing League and rallying. They have supported 19 successful Formula One World Championships and 252 Grand Prix victories.
