= Jim Crawley =

American football coach (1934–2024)

Biographical details
- Born: February 11, 1934; Frostburg, Maryland, U.S.
- Died: July 31, 2024 (aged 90)

Coaching career (HC unless noted)
- 1968–1974: Frostburg State

Head coaching record
- Overall: 33–28–3

Jim Crawley (February 11, 1934 – July 31, 2024) was an American football coach. He was the third head football coach at Frostburg State University in Frostburg, Maryland, serving for seven seasons, from 1968 to 1974, and compiling a record of 33–28–3. Crawley died in Frostburg on July 31, 2024, at the age of 90. His wife, Nancy, predeceased him on July 4.
