= Sunfest (Gimli, Manitoba) =

Former Canadian rock music festival

- Promotional poster of the 1993 edition of Sunfest
- Genre: Rock
- Locations: Gimli Motorsports Park, Gimli, Manitoba, Canada
- Years active: 1990–1996
- Founders: Nite Out Entertainment

Sunfest was an annual rock festival based in Gimli, Manitoba, Canada, at Gimli Motorsports Park. The festival was held over a three or four-day period every August from 1990 to 1996 and featured predominantly Canadian rock bands.

== History ==
=== 1990 ===
The first Sunfest rock festival was held from August 17 to August 19 of 1990. The lineup for the festival included Bachman–Turner Overdrive, Doug and the Slugs, The Northern Pikes, The Tragically Hip, Queen City Kids, Kenny Shields and The Watchmen. About 21,000 people attended the festival.

=== 1991 ===
A second Sunfest was held the next year from August 16 to August 18. The festival's lineup for that year included Crash Test Dummies, The Tragically Hip and Blue Rodeo. 42,000 people attended that year's festival.

=== 1992 ===
The 1992 edition of Sunfest was held from August 14 to August 16. The festival's lineup for that year included The Watchmen, Tom Cochrane, 54-40, Colin James, Sue Medley, April Wine and Kim Mitchell. The festival again succeeded in having more attendees than the previous year's.

=== 1993 ===
The 1993 edition of Sunfest was held from August 13 to August 15. It was the first year the festival featured a band from outside of Canada. That year's festival was headlined by Pearl Jam, and also featured Blue Rodeo, Wild T and the Spirit, 54-40, The Watchmen, The Pursuit of Happiness, Skydiggers, Sass Jordan, Streetheart, Randy Bachman, Sven Gali and Headstones. Day 2 set a record one-day attendance for the festival with 19,000 people attending the night in which Pearl Jam performed.

=== 1994 ===
The 1994 edition of Sunfest was held from August 11 to August 14. The festival's lineup for that year included The Waltons, Headstones, The Tea Party, Sass Jordan, Our Lady Peace, 13 Engines, The Odds, Moist, The Watchmen, 54-40, David Gogo, Trooper, April Wine, Joan Jett and Kim Mitchell.

=== 1995 ===
The 1995 edition of Sunfest was held from August 17 to August 20. The festival's lineup for that year included Punchbuggy, The Age of Electric, The Tea Party, The Pursuit of Happiness, The Odds, Barenaked Ladies, Rhymes with Orange, 13 Engines, Headstones, Moist, Big Sugar, Barney Bentall, Colin James and Tom Cochrane.

=== 1996 ===
The final edition of Sunfest was held from August 16 to 18 of 1996. The festival's lineup for that year included 54-40, Sloan, Blue Meanies, Headstones, The Killjoys, Pluto and Limblifter. Vince Neil was originally scheduled to perform at the 1996 festival but cancelled.
