= Richard Craig Hill =

Canadian racing driver (1934–2012)

Craig Hill
- Nationality: (Canada) Canadian
- Full name: Richard Craig Hill
- Born: January 9, 1934 Hamilton, Ontario, Canada
- Died: November 1, 2012 (aged 78) West Lorne, Ontario, Canada

Richard Craig Hill (born January 19, 1934) was a Canadian professional automobile racer. Hill died at his home in West Lorne, Ontario on November 1, 2012.

== Racing career ==
In a driving career that spanned almost 40 years, Craig Hill raced and won in almost every type of racing car, from midgets and super-modified stock cars to sports cars and sophisticated open-wheel formula cars. He was Canadian Formula B champion in 1969 and 1970, driving a Formula Ford he modified to formula B spec. He co-drove with Ludwig Heimrath to win the Sundown Grand Prix in 1973 and 1974.

He was inducted into the Canadian Motorsport Hall of Fame in 1996.

=== Other Motorsports Involvement ===
As advertising and promotions manager of Castrol Canada, he was involved in that company's investment in Canadian motorsport.

== See also ==
- Formula Atlantic
