= Chip Mead =

American racing driver

Harry Talbott "Chip" Mead, Jr. (March 17, 1950 – March 31, 1993) was an American racing driver from Dayton, Ohio.

Starting out in US Formula Super Vee, the single-seat Can-Am series, and North American Formula Atlantic in the late-1970s including a seventh-place points finish in the 1977 Formula Atlantic season, Mead later made seven starts in the CART Championship Car series from 1980 to 1983. His best finish was 9th place at the Spring race at Phoenix International Raceway in 1982. He attempted to qualify for the Indianapolis 500 in 1981 and 1982 but failed to find enough speed to qualify in 1981 and was bumped from the field (on the bubble) the following year. After his experience in CART, Mead moved on to the popular IMSA Camel GT series.

As an IMSA and CART driver, Mead started out in Formula Atlantic Championship in 1974, raced in F3 in England for a year with Doug Shierson, and made six starts in the CART Series between 1980 and 1983 – his best finish was a 9th at Phoenix in 1981 – but was best known as a sports car driver. Through the late-1970s and 1980s, he drove a wide variety of sports cars in IMSA and CanAm, from Porsche 911s to 934s and from the Fabcar Porsche to a Lola T711 Chevrolet. 1987 was his best year driving the Porsche Fabcar, often referred to as the Baby 962. The team came second in class in the 24 Hours of Daytona, won their class at the 12 Hours of Sebring, won their class again at the Miami Grand Prix, and took another second in the West Palm Beach GP. Racing against factory teams from Ferrari, Buick, Pontiac and Mazda, the Dayton, Ohio-based team were front runners all season, adding the California 500 at Sears Point to their record. Mead was awarded the Porsche Cup for their accomplishments.

After leaving his Real Estate Development business in St. Simons Island, Georgia, Mead and his wife moved to Saratoga, California where Mead owned an aircraft sales firm based in San Jose, California. On March 31, 1993, Mead as a passenger on a plane flown by a colleague was killed when the plane crashed near Livermore, California. Mead was survived by his wife Caroline (Quintard) Mead, his mother Mary Wilshire Mead, daughter Hannah Reeves (Derriso), brothers Dan Mead, George Mead, Whit Mead, Dudley Mead and sister Mimi Mead-Hagen.

== Racing record ==
=== SCCA National Championship Runoffs ===
Year	Track	Car	Engine	Class	Finish	Start	Status
1975	Road Atlanta	March 75B	Cosworth	Formula B	5	9	Running
