= Doug Shierson Racing =

Former racing team

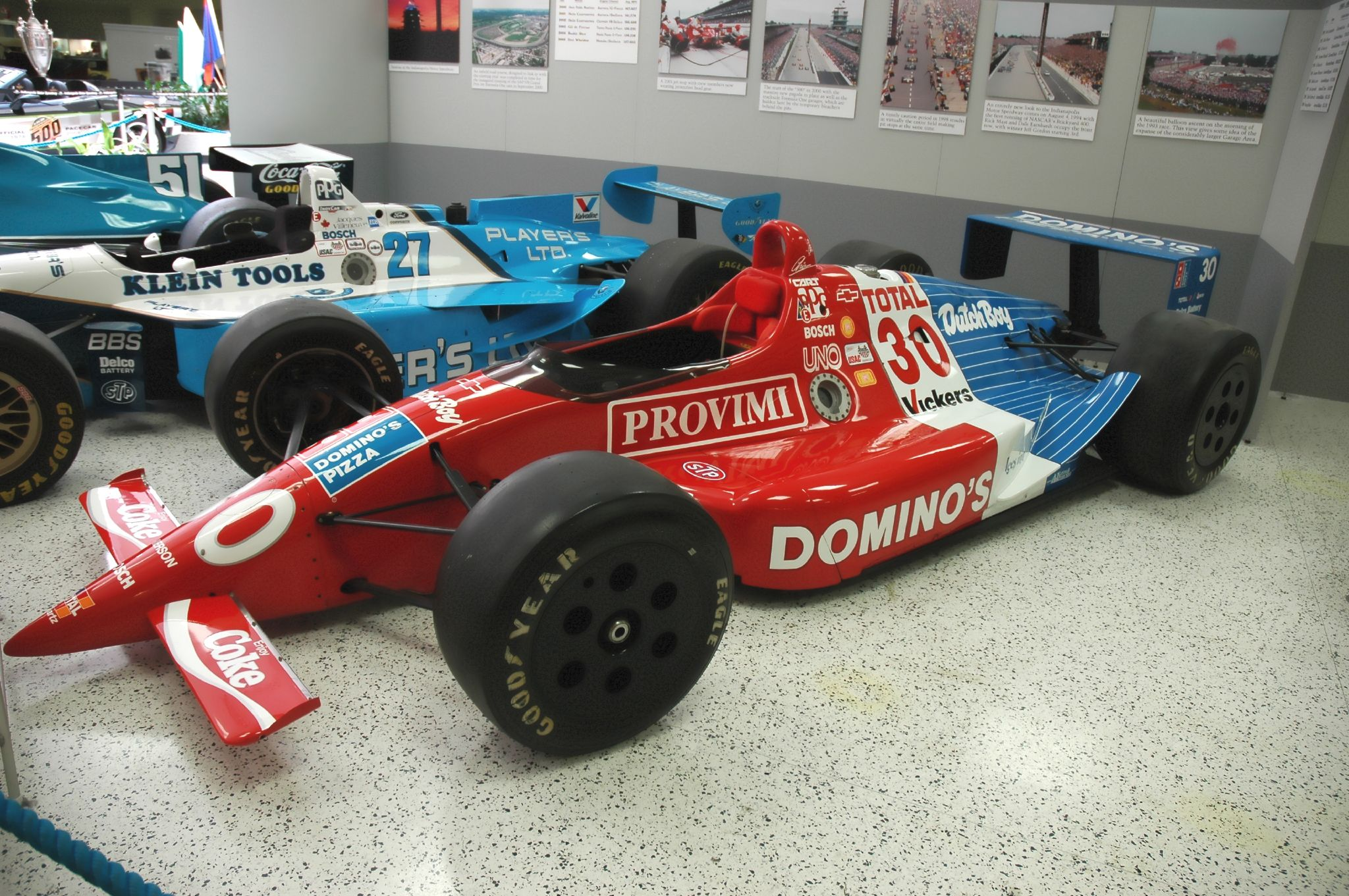
Shierson's 1990 CART entry for Arie Luyendyk, which won the 1990 Indianapolis 500.

Doug Shierson Racing is a former racing team that competed in the CART Indy car series from 1982 to 1990. The team was sponsored by Domino's Pizza for its entire run in CART. Shierson Racing won 7 Indy car races, with their biggest victory coming at the 1990 Indianapolis 500, with driver Arie Luyendyk. The team finished runner-up in the 1985 CART Championship with driver Al Unser Jr. losing the title by one point.

== Early years ==
Shierson was instrumental in the development of the Formula Atlantic series in the late 1970s, winning the championship with Howdy Holmes in 1978 and Jacques Villeneuve the Elder in 1980 and 1981. Bobby Rahal drove for the team in 1976 and suffered a season fraught with difficulties and he considered leaving the sport, on Shierson's urging Rahal decided to stay with the series in 1977 and eventually had a tremendously successful racing career. The team was also active in Formula 5000.

== CART years ==
=== 1982-1983 ===
Shierson racing moved up to CART with Howdy Holmes in 1982. Holmes drove the team's car to 10th at the Indianapolis 500 and 13th in points. The best finish was a 4th place at Milwaukee. Holmes repeated his 13th-place points finish and finished 6th at Indy the following year.

=== 1984 ===
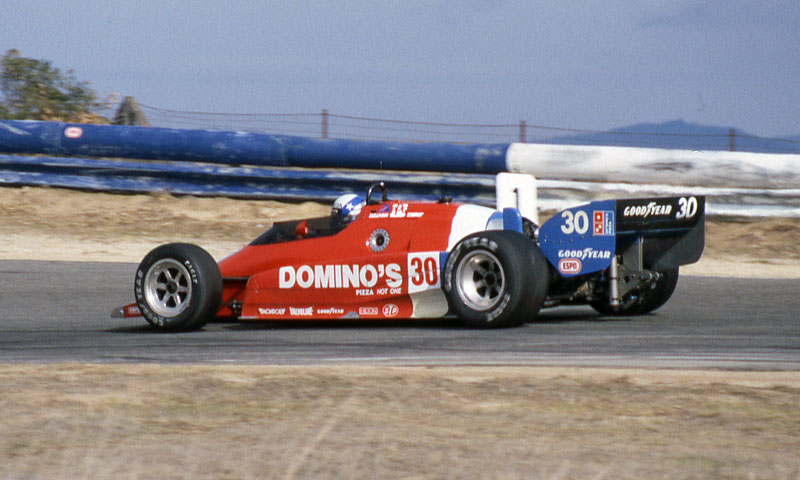
Danny Sullivan driving for Shierson Racing at Laguna Seca in 1984.

Danny Sullivan replaced Holmes in 1984 and brought the team its first three CART wins at Cleveland, the Pocono 500, and Sanair on his way to 4th place in points.

The team experimented with its own DSR-1 chassis that was designed by Ian Reed of March Engineering and built by laid off Williams F1 fabricators. It was abandoned by Indianapolis when it was clearly off the pace and the team returned to Lola equipment. Sullivan was hired away by perennial superpower Penske Racing following his successful 1984 season.

=== 1985-1987 ===
Initially, Shierson signed John Paul Jr.; however, Paul would be jailed for racketeering in a case involving his father. After attempting to hire Al Unser Sr., Shierson instead secured the services of Al Unser Jr., who would come into his own as a driver during his stint with the team.

In 1985, Al Unser Jr. won back to back mid-season races at the Meadowlands and Cleveland. He was leading the race at Road America, when it started to rain. But before he could get to the pits for rain tires, he spun out suffering a fractured ankle. He rebounded to score six top-four finishes over the last seven races, and put himself in position to win the championship. Al Jr. famously lost the championship title by only one point. He effectively lost the championship in the waning laps of the final race of the season (Tamiami Park), when his father Al Unser Sr. finished just high enough to clinch enough points to mathematically secure the title.

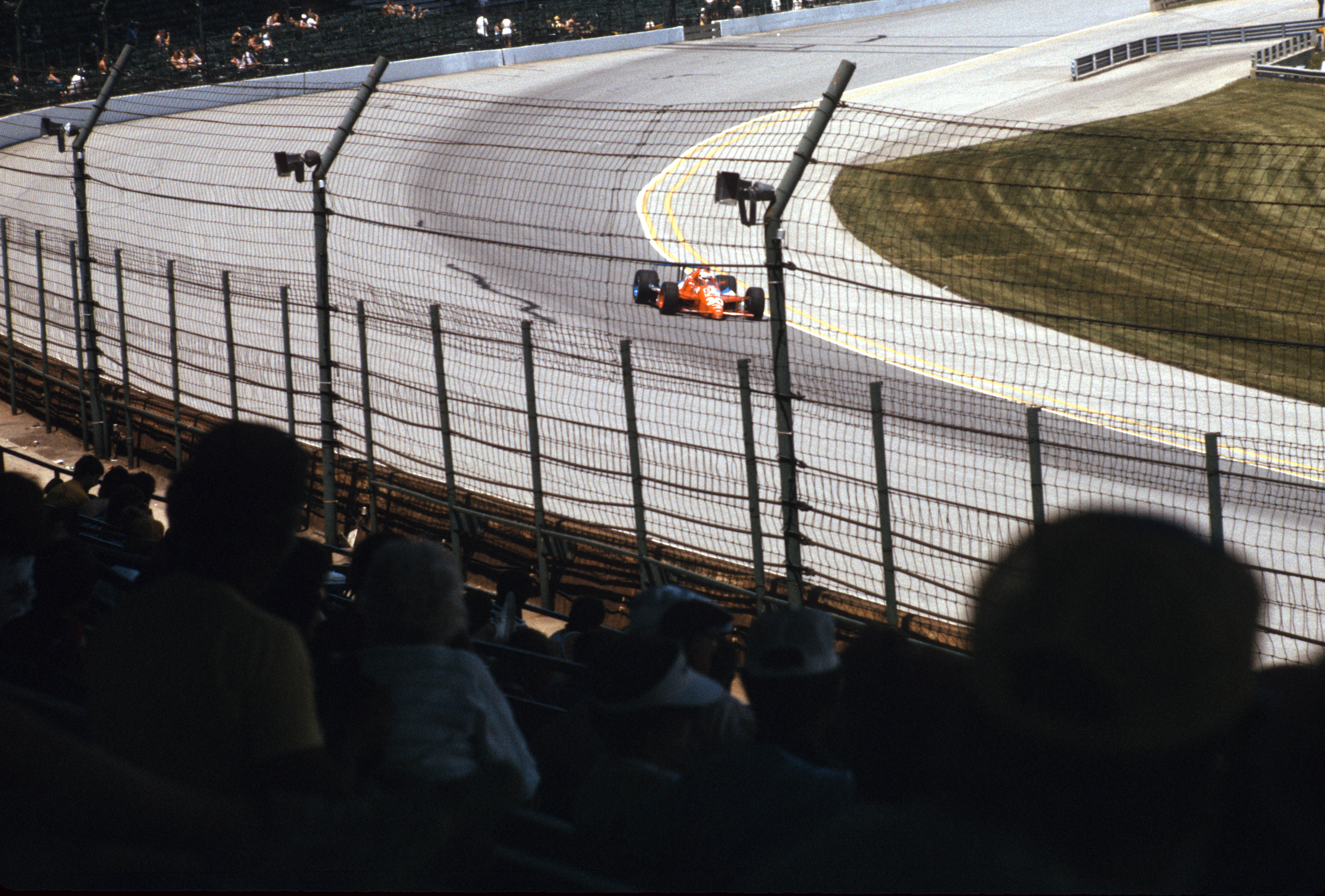
Al Unser Jr. qualifying his Shierson Racing car for the 1987 Indianapolis 500.

The team fared strongly again in 1986 with Unser finishing 4th in points and winning the final race of the season. In 1987 Unser improved to 3rd place in points but did not win any races. At year's end Unser elected to return to Galles Racing who had the new Chevrolet-Ilmor engine which would go on to dominate Indy cars over the next several seasons.

Unser Jr. achieved top five finishes at the Indianapolis 500 for the team in 1986 (5th) and 1987 (4th).

=== 1988-1989 ===
Shierson replaced Unser with Raul Boesel. Boesel failed to win and only managed 8th and 11th in points in his two years with the team. The team was hampered by the use of the underpowered Cosworth and Judd engines. The highlight of the season, however, was a surprising third place at the 1989 Indianapolis 500.

=== 1990 ===
For 1990 the team put veteran journeyman Arie Luyendyk in the Domino's car for which it had secured Chevy-Ilmor power and expanded to a second car for Scott Goodyear running year-old equipment with Judd power. Luyendyk, who had never won a CART race before, shocked the establishment by winning the 1990 Indianapolis 500 from 3rd on the grid in what was the fastest "500" in history.

Midway through the 1990 season, Shierson sold 50% of the stake in the team to businessman Bob Tezak, owner of International Games (makers of UNO). Longtime sponsor Domino's Pizza was facing legal issues stemming from their "30 minutes or it's free" delivery guarantee. During the history of the team sponsorship, the Shierson entries traditionally carried the number 30, as a gesture to the "30-minutes or free" delivery policy. Some delivery drivers were reportedly breaking traffic laws and speeding to fulfill the guarantee. Such an instance caused a fatal traffic accident, and company officials deemed sponsoring a race car inappropriate given the circumstances.

Luyendyk rode a wave of positive attention and newfound popularity to an 8th-place finish in the 1990 CART points standings. However, he did not manage to win another race, and Indy was in fact the only top 3 result of the season. He had two 4th-place finishes, at the Meadowlands, and the exhibition Marlboro Challenge at Nazareth.

== End of team ==
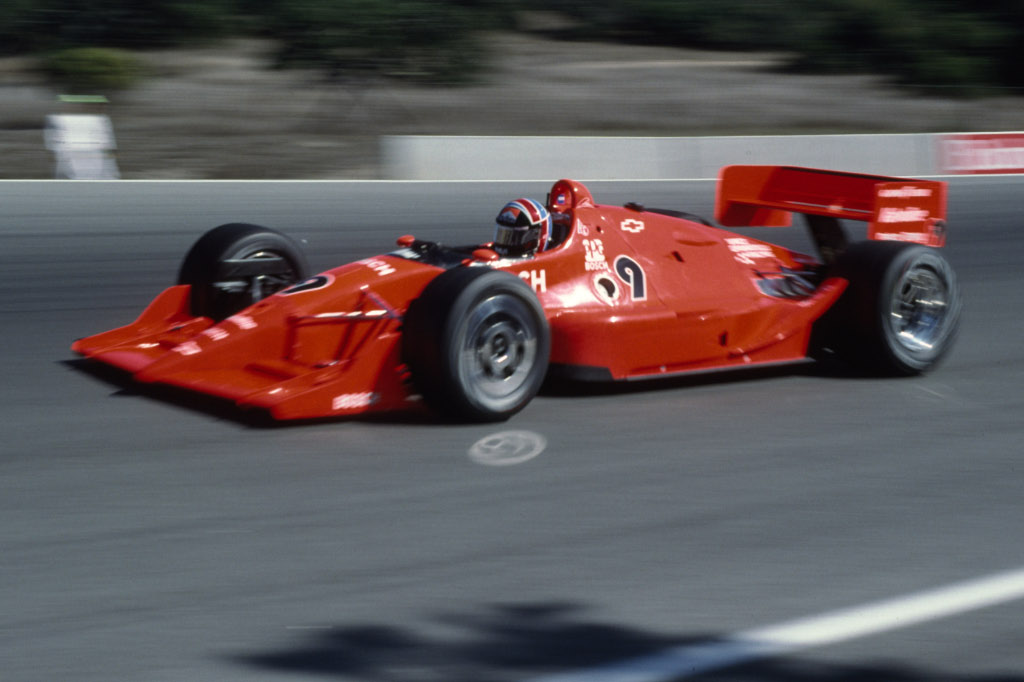
Luyendyk driving the UNO/Granatelli car in 1991 at Laguna Seca

Facing sponsorship uncertainty, and deciding that he had accomplished his goals in the sport, Shierson eventually sold the entire team outright to Tezak in January 1991. Tezak took over the team in a joint effort with Vince Granatelli (merging with Granatelli's team, Vince Granatelli Racing), and re-booted the team as UNO/Granatelli Racing. The car's livery was changed to the classic day-glow orange utilized by Granatelli entries over the years, and Luyendyk's services were retained for 1991. Granatelli assumed day-to-day operations with Tezak fulfilling sponsorship and funding.

The UNO/Granatelli team suffered thoroughly from a lack of sponsorship money, which caused friction as the season endured. RCA sponsored the car at Indy, but for most of the other races, the car had blank sidepods. Driver Arie Luyendyk managed to win two races; Phoenix and Nazareth. He finished 3rd at the Indy 500, and 2nd at the Michigan 500. A second team car at Indy for Al Unser Sr. was discussed, but ultimately the arrangement fell through.

The team nearly folded in June/July when Tezak announced he was out of money, and pulled his support. In early August, Granatelli battled a restraining order from Tezak and Total Petroleum, which prevented them from taking to the track at the Michigan 500 for practice and qualifying. The order was lifted, and Luyendyk nearly won the race, finishing a close second to Rick Mears.

Despite two wins and a 6th-place finish in points for 1991, the re-booted team closed its doors permanently at the conclusion of the 1991 season.

Doug Shierson died May 26, 2004, of cancer.

== Drivers in CART ==
=== Doug Shierson Racing ===
- (United States) Howdy Holmes (1982-1983)
- (United States) Danny Sullivan (1984)
- (United States) Al Unser Jr. (1985-1987)
- (Brazil) Raul Boesel (1988-1989)
- (Netherlands) Arie Luyendyk (1990 - primary)
- (Canada) Scott Goodyear (1990 - secondary)

=== UNO/Grantelli Racing ===
- (Netherlands) Arie Luyendyk (1991)

== Race results ==
=== CART IndyCar Series results ===
(key)

Year	Chassis	Engine	Drivers	No.	1	2	3	4	5	6	7	8	9	10	11	12	13	14	15	16	17	Pts Pos	Pos
1982					PHX	ATL	MIL	CLE	MCH	MIL	POC	RIV	ROA	MCH	PHX								
1982	March 82C	Cosworth DFX	(United States) Howdy Holmes	30	16	DNS	10	16	12	4	27	16	10	5	10							13th	56
1983					ATL	INDY	MIL	CLE	MCH	ROA	POC	RIV	MDO	MCH	CPL	LAG	PHX						
1983	March 83C	Cosworth DFX	(United States) Howdy Holmes	30	9	6	7	12	32	16	13	13	8	8	17	5	21					13th	39
1984					LBH	PHX	INDY	MIL	POR	MEA	CLE	MCH	ROA	POC	MDO	SAN	MCH	PHX	LAG	CPL			
1984	DSR-1	Cosworth DFX	(United States) Danny Sullivan	30	24	6		16														4th	110
1984	Lola T800	Cosworth DFX	(United States) Danny Sullivan	30			29		23	2	1	10	19	1	3	1	9	20	9	18		4th	110
1985					LBH	INDY	MIL	POR	MEA	CLE	MCH	ROA	POC	MDO	SAN	MCH	LAG	PHX	MIA				
1985	Lola T800	Cosworth DFX	(United States) Al Unser Jr.	30	9	25	7	2*	1*	1	15	17*	2*	4	3	23	3	2	3			2nd	151
1985	Lola T800	Cosworth DFX	(United States) Tom Gloy	30									DNS									—	0
1986					PHX	LBH	INDY	MIL	POR	MEA	CLE	TOR	MCH	POC	MDO	SAN	MCH	ROA	LAG	PHX	MIA		
1986	Lola T86/00	Cosworth DFX	(United States) Al Unser Jr.	30	12	2	5	8	3	9	8	4*	8	6	5	2	21	11	23	6	1	4th	137
1987					LBH	PHX	INDY	MIL	POR	MEA	CLE	TOR	MCH	POC	ROA	MDO	NAZ	LAG	MIA				
1987	March 87C	Cosworth DFX	(United States) Al Unser Jr.	30	2	14	4	5	20	8	3	20	18	23	3	23	6	4	2			3rd	107
1988					PHX	LBH	INDY	MIL	POR	CLE	TOR	MEA	MCH	POC	MDO	ROA	NAZ	LAG	MIA				
1988	March 88C	Cosworth DFX	(Brazil) Raul Boesel	30	5	4		4	26													8th	89
1988	Lola T88/00	Cosworth DFX	(Brazil) Raul Boesel	30			7			5	8	9	11	5	6	14	5	21	22			8th	89
1989					PHX	LBH	INDY	MIL	DET	POR	CLE	MEA	TOR	MCH	POC	MDO	ROA	NAZ	LAG				
1989	Lola T89/00	Judd AV	(Brazil) Raul Boesel	30	14	6	3	4	28	7	8	6	7	20	20	23	9	11	10			11th	68
1990					PHX	LBH	INDY	MIL	DET	POR	CLE	MEA	TOR	MCH	DEN	VAN	MDO	ROA	NAZ	LAG			
1990	Lola T89/00	Judd AV	(Canada) Scott Goodyear	11	10	17		10	8	22	18	17	9	10	8	7	22	12	10	14		13th	36
1990	Lola T89/00	Judd AV	(Canada) Scott Goodyear	28			10															13th	36
1990	Lola T90/00	Chevrolet 265A	(Netherlands) Arie Luyendyk	30	9	7	1	19	5	6	6	4	5	19	13	26	21	6	17	9		8th	90
UNO-Granatelli Racing
1991					SFR	LBH	PHX	INDY	MIL	DET	POR	CLE	MEA	TOR	MCH	DEN	VAN	MDO	ROA	NAZ	LAG		
1991	Lola T91/00	Chevrolet 265A	(Netherlands) Arie Luyendyk	9	9	5	1*		17	3	7	5	18	19	2	22	19	9	5	1	8	6th	134
1991	Lola T91/00	Chevrolet 265A	(Netherlands) Arie Luyendyk	1				3														6th	134

== IndyCar wins ==
#	Season	Date	Sanction	Track / Race	No.	Winning driver	Chassis	Engine	Tire	Grid	Laps Led
1	1984	July 8	CART	Grand Prix of Cleveland (S)	30	(United States) Danny Sullivan	Lola T800	Cosworth DFX V8t	Goodyear	5	7
2	1984	August 19	CART	Pocono 500 (O)	30	(United States) Danny Sullivan (2)	Lola T800	Cosworth DFX	Goodyear	9	22
3	1984	September 9	CART	Sanair Super Speedway (O)	30	(United States) Danny Sullivan (3)	Lola T800	Cosworth DFX	Goodyear	2	95
4	1985	June 30	CART	Meadowlands Street Circuit (S)	30	(United States) Al Unser Jr.	Lola T900	Cosworth DFX	Goodyear	6	51
5	1985	July 7	CART	Grand Prix of Cleveland (S)	30	(United States) Al Unser Jr. (2)	Lola T900	Cosworth DFX	Goodyear	7	4
6	1986	November 9	CART	Tamiami Park, Miami (S)	30	(United States) Al Unser Jr. (3)	Lola T86/00	Cosworth DFX	Goodyear	19	1
7	1990	May 27	USAC	Indianapolis 500 (O)	30	(Netherlands) Arie Luyendyk	Lola T90/00	Chevrolet 265A	Goodyear	3	35

- Note: this does not include two wins achieved in 1991 as UNO/Granatelli Racing
