= Bill Brack =

Canadian racing driver (born 1935)

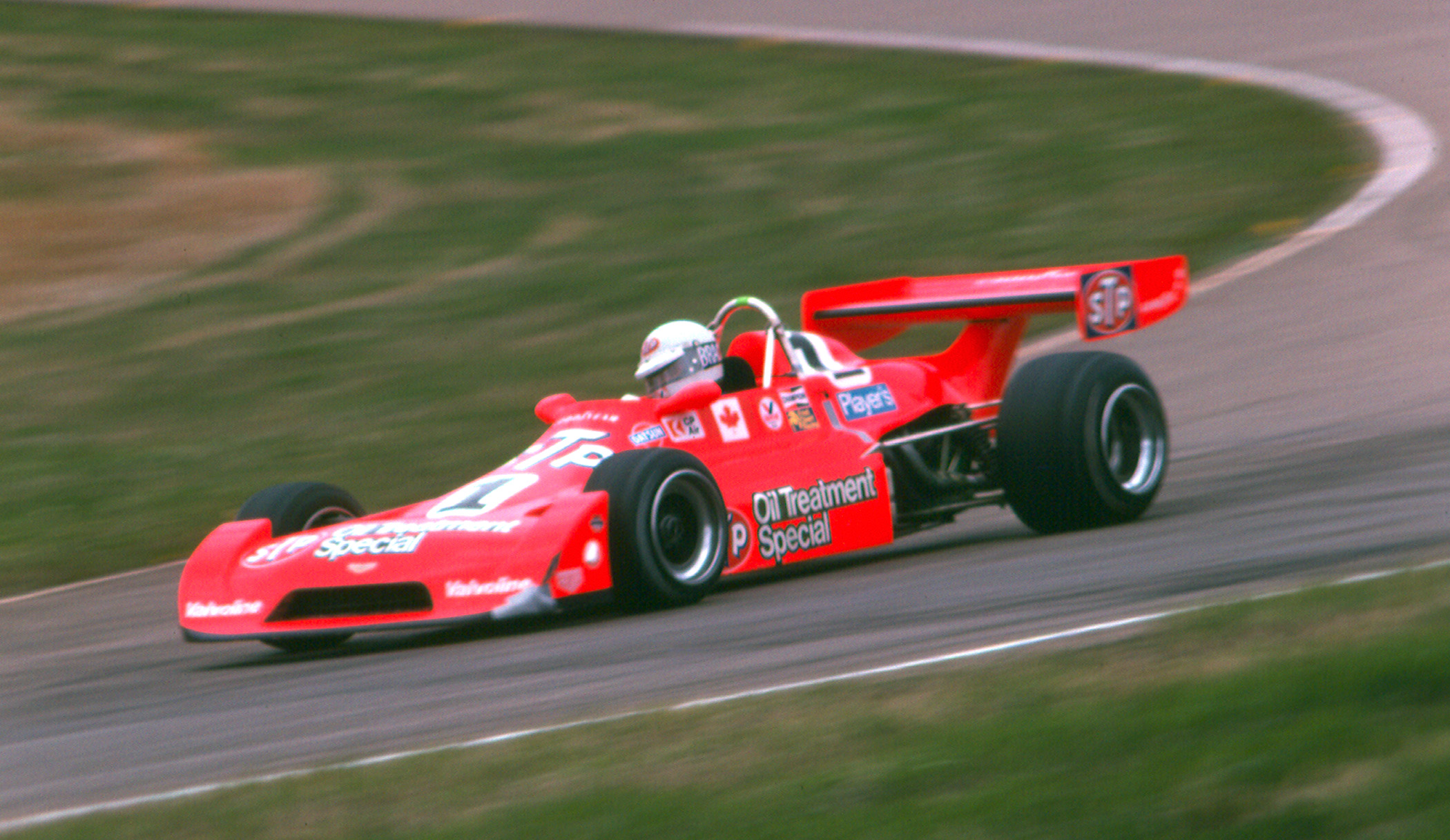
- Brack at Edmonton International Speedway Formula Atlantic in 1975
- Born: 26 December 1935 (age 90); Toronto, Ontario, Canada

Formula One World Championship career
- Nationality: (Canada) Canadian
- Active years: 1968 – 1969, 1972
- Team(s): Lotus, BRM
- Entries: 3
- Championships: 0
- Wins: 0
- Podiums: 0
- Career points: 0
- Pole positions: 0
- Fastest laps: 0
- First entry: 1968 Canadian Grand Prix
- Last entry: 1972 Canadian Grand Prix

William Brack (born 26 December 1935) is a Canadian former racing driver. Brack raced in Formula One and the Atlantic Championship.

Born in Toronto, Ontario, Canada, Brack originally became involved in auto racing in the early 1960s, in the form of ice-racing Minis (using a company car) in Huntsville, Ontario. He went on to purchase Gordon Brown's own racing Mini (Gord Brown being another Mini racer as well as dealer of British cars at Glendale Suburban Motors in Brampton.)

Brack subsequently became a Formula One driver who raced for the Lotus and BRM teams. After Formula One he was successful in Atlantic Championship in the mid-1970s, having won the Canadian Formula Atlantic Championships in three successive years (1973, 1974, 1975) before retiring from racing to open a Daimler Chrysler dealership (Downtown Chrysler) near the Canadian National Exhibition in Toronto. He is not related to the Swedish race car driver Kenny Bräck.

== Complete Formula One results ==
(key)

Year	Entrant	Chassis	Engine	1	2	3	4	5	6	7	8	9	10	11	12	WDC	Points
1968	Gold Leaf Team Lotus	Lotus 49B	Cosworth V8	RSA	ESP	MON	BEL	NED	FRA	GBR	GER	ITA	CAN; Ret	USA	MEX	NC	0
1969	Owen Racing Organisation	BRM P138	BRM V12	RSA	ESP	MON	NED	FRA	GBR	GER	ITA	CAN; NC	USA	MEX		NC	0
1972	Marlboro BRM	BRM P180	BRM V12	ARG	RSA	ESP	MON	BEL	FRA	GBR	GER	AUT	ITA	CAN; Ret	USA	NC	0

Sporting positions
Preceded by Inaugural	Canadian Formula Atlantic; Champion; 1974–1975	Succeeded by Gilles Villeneuve
