= Rehal =

Rehal may refer to:

- Rehal (surname), name of multiple origins; includes people with the name
- Rehal (book rest), a book rest for holy books

== Places ==
- Rehal Dhamalian, a village in Jammu and Kashmir, India
- Rehal Kalandrian, a village in Jammu and Kashmir, India
- Rehal, Rohtas, a hamlet in Bihar, India

== See also ==
- Riehl (disambiguation)
- Rahal (disambiguation)
- Rehali (disambiguation)
- Rehala Falls, waterfalls in Himachal Pradesh
- Rehalpura, a hamlet in Himachal Pradesh, India
- Rehalkar, a settlement in Himachal Pradesh, India
- Rehaliya, a settlement in Rajasthan, India
- Reyhal, a place in Iran
