= Michael Bleekemolen =

Dutch racing driver (born 1949)

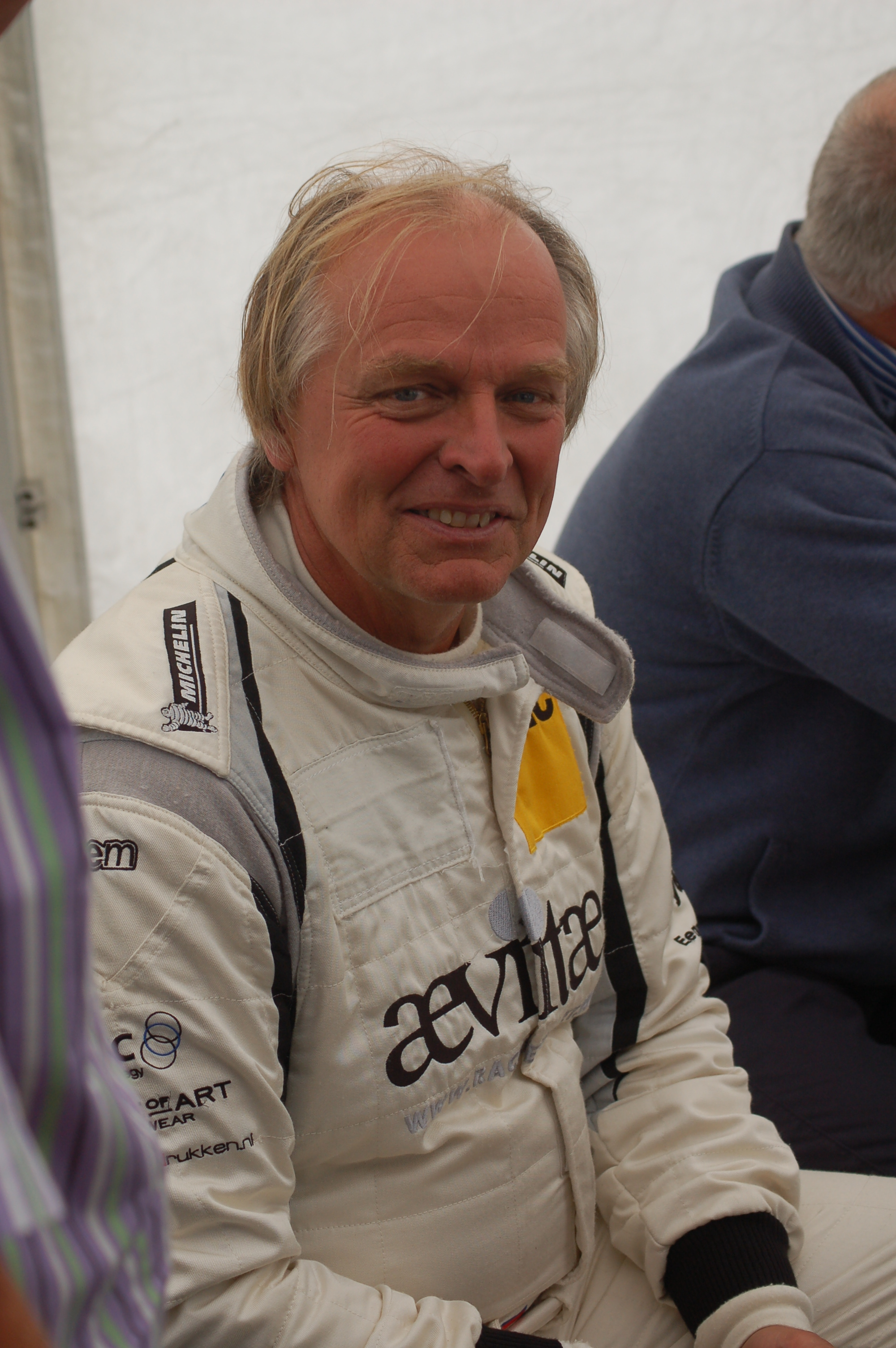
- Bleekemolen in 2011
- Born: 2 October 1949 (age 77); Amsterdam, Netherlands

Formula One World Championship career
- Nationality: (Netherlands) Dutch
- Active years: 1977 – 1978
- Team(s): RAM, ATS
- Entries: 5 (1 start)
- Championships: 0
- Wins: 0
- Podiums: 0
- Career points: 0
- Pole positions: 0
- Fastest laps: 0
- First entry: 1977 Dutch Grand Prix
- Last entry: 1978 Canadian Grand Prix

NASCAR Whelen Euro Series career
- Debut season: 2019
- Current team: Team Bleekemolen (PRO) Rette Jones Racing (OPEN)
- Car number: 72 (PRO) 30 (OPEN)
- Starts: 58
- Wins: 0
- Poles: 0
- Fastest laps: 0
- Best finish: 12th in 2019, 2023-2024
- Finished last season: 12th in 2024

Michael Bleekemolen (born 2 October 1949) is a Dutch racing driver who currently competes in the NASCAR Whelen Euro Series, driving for the family-owned Team Bleekemolen in the No. 72 Ford Mustang in the EuroNASCAR 2 class. He previously raced for the RAM and ATS teams in Formula One.

Bleekemolen graduated from Formula Vee and tried his hand at Formula One in 1977, where he failed to qualify at his home Grand Prix. Nevertheless, he returned the following year with ATS for four races, but qualified only once, at Watkins Glen.

After Formula One, Bleekemolen returned to Formula 3 for another three years, winning two rounds of the 1979 European Championship and finishing second in the series to Alain Prost. From there he moved to one-make Renault racing, where he remains to this day. His sons Jeroen and Sebastiaan are also racers.

== Racing record ==
=== Complete Formula One results ===
(key)

| Year | Entrant | Chassis | Engine | 1 | 2 | 3 | 4 | 5 | 6 | 7 | 8 | 9 | 10 | 11 | 12 | 13 | 14 | 15 | 16 | 17 | WDC | Points |
|---|---|---|---|---|---|---|---|---|---|---|---|---|---|---|---|---|---|---|---|---|---|---|
| 1977 | F&S Properties Racing | March 761 | Cosworth V8 | ARG | BRA | RSA | USW | ESP | MON | BEL | SWE | FRA | GBR | GER | AUT | NED; DNQ | ITA | USA | CAN | JPN | NC | 0 |
| 1978 | F&S Properties / ATS Racing Team | ATS HS1 | Cosworth V8 | ARG | BRA | RSA | USW | MON | BEL | ESP | SWE | FRA | GBR | GER | AUT | NED; DNQ | ITA; DNQ | USA; Ret | CAN; DNQ | | NC | 0 |

=== Complete European Formula Two Championship results ===
(key) (Races in bold indicate pole position; races in italics indicate fastest lap)

| Year | Entrant | Chassis | Engine | 1 | 2 | 3 | 4 | 5 | 6 | 7 | 8 | 9 | 10 | 11 | 12 | Pos | Pts |
|---|---|---|---|---|---|---|---|---|---|---|---|---|---|---|---|---|---|
| 1978 | Fred Opert Racing | Chevron B42 | Hart | THR | HOC | NÜR | PAU | MUG | VLL | ROU | DON | NOG; DNQ | PER; Ret | MIS | HOC; 8 | — | 0 |

=== Complete Porsche Supercup results ===
(key) (Races in bold indicate pole position) (Races in italics indicate fastest lap)

| Year | Team | Car | 1 | 2 | 3 | 4 | 5 | 6 | 7 | 8 | 9 | 10 | 11 | 12 | DC | Points |
|---|---|---|---|---|---|---|---|---|---|---|---|---|---|---|---|---|
| 2003 | Team Bleekemolen | Porsche 996 GT3 | ITA; 11 | ESP; 14 | AUT; 18 | MON; 9 | GER; 17 | FRA; 12 | GBR; 13 | GER; 12 | HUN; 11 | ITA; Ret | USA; 7 | USA; 11 | 10th | 68 |
| 2004 | Team Bleekemolen | Porsche 996 GT3 | ITA; 13 | ESP; 14 | MON; Ret | GER | USA | USA | FRA | GBR | GER | HUN | BEL; 11 | ITA | NC‡ | 0‡ |
| 2006 | Team Bleekemolen | Porsche 997 GT3 | BHR | ITA; 16 | GER; 20 | ESP | MON; 11 | GBR | USA; 5 | USA; 12 | FRA | GER; 20 | HUN; 15 | ITA; 17 | 13th | 48 |
| 2007 | Bleekemolen Race Planet | Porsche 997 GT3 | BHR; 19 | BHR; 20 | ESP | MON | FRA | GBR | GER; 21 | HUN | TUR | ITA | BEL | | 33rd | 0 |
| 2008 | Racing Team Jetstream | Porsche 997 GT3 | BHR | BHR | ESP | TUR | MON; 20 | FRA | GBR | GER | HUN; 20 | ESP; 18 | BEL; 20 | ITA; 15 | 29th | 3 |

‡ Not eligible for points

=== Complete NASCAR results ===
==== Euro Series – EuroNASCAR PRO ====
(key) (Bold – Pole position. Italics – Fastest lap. * – Most laps led. ^ – Most positions gained)

NASCAR Euro Series – EuroNASCAR PRO results
| Year | Team | No. | Make | 1 | 2 | 3 | 4 | 5 | 6 | 7 | 8 | 9 | 10 | 11 | 12 | NES | Pts |
|---|---|---|---|---|---|---|---|---|---|---|---|---|---|---|---|---|---|
| 2025 | Race Planet Team Bleekemolen | 72 | Toyota | ESP; 22 | ESP; 18 | ITA; 15 | ITA; Wth | GBR | GBR | CZE | CZE | GER | GER | BEL | BEL | 33rd | 56 |

==== Euro Series – EuroNASCAR 2 ====
NASCAR Euro Series – EuroNASCAR 2 results
| Year | Team | No. | Make | 1 | 2 | 3 | 4 | 5 | 6 | 7 | 8 | 9 | 10 | 11 | 12 | 13 | NWES | Points |
|---|---|---|---|---|---|---|---|---|---|---|---|---|---|---|---|---|---|---|
| 2019 | Team Bleekemolen | 69 | Ford | VAL; 10 | VAL; 14 | FRA; 18 | FRA; 28 | BRH; 7 | BRH; 20 | MOS; 14 | MOS; 13 | VEN; 10 | HOC; 14 | HOC; 17 | | | 12th | 371 |
| 2019 | Team Bleekemolen | 70 | Ford | | | | | | | | | | | | ZOL; 10 | ZOL; 20 | 12th | 371 |
| 2021 | Team Bleekemolen | 69 | Ford | ESP; DNS | ESP; 15 | GBR; 14 | GBR; 21 | CZE; Wth | CZE; Wth | CRO | CRO | BEL | BEL | ITA | ITA | | 26th | 70 |
| 2022 | Team Bleekemolen | 72 | Chevy | ESP; 31 | ESP; 28 | GBR; 17 | GBR; 23 | ITA; 17 | ITA; 18 | | | BEL; 8 | BEL; 15 | CRO; 18 | CRO; 22 | | 20th | 228 |
| 2022 | Team Bleekemolen | 69 | Ford | | | | | | | CZE; 21 | CZE; 20 | | | | | | 20th | 228 |
| 2023 | Team Bleekemolen | 72 | Chevy | ESP; 14 | ESP; 15 | | | | | | | | | | | | 12th | 305 |
| 2023 | Team Bleekemolen | 72 | Toyota | | | GBR; 21 | GBR; 10 | ITA; 10^ | ITA; 9 | CZE; 16 | CZE; 11 | GER; 12 | GER; 10 | BEL; 8 | BEL; 20 | | 12th | 305 |
| 2024 | Racing Planet Team Bleekemolen | 72 | Toyota | ESP; 13 | ESP; 15 | ITA; 15 | ITA; 10 | GBR; 12 | GBR; 7^ | NED; 9 | CZE; 10 | CZE; 10 | GER; 13 | GER; 15 | BEL; 17 | BEL; 16 | 12th | 392 |
| 2025 | Rette Jones Racing | 30 | Ford | ESP | ESP | ITA | ITA | GBR; 21 | GBR; 17 | CZE; 12 | CZE; 12 | GER; 18 | GER; 16 | BEL; 14 | BEL; 14 | | 18th | 264 |

== Sources ==
- Profile at www.grandprix.com
- Michael Bleekemolen driver statistics at Racing-Reference
- Michael Bleekemolen career summary at DriverDB.com
