= Rehal (surname) =

Rehal is a surname and may refer to:

- Navtej Singh Rehal, lead singer in Bombay Rockers
- Joseph E. Rehal, businessman
- Saiful Rehal, Eighth Sultan of Brunei

== See also ==
- Rahal (disambiguation)
- Rahal clan
