= Rehali =

Rehali may refer to:

- Rehali, Maharashtra, Gondia district, Maharashtra, India
- Rehali, Madhya Pradesh, Shajapur district, Madhya Pradesh, India
