= Bobby Rahal =

American racing driver (born 1953)

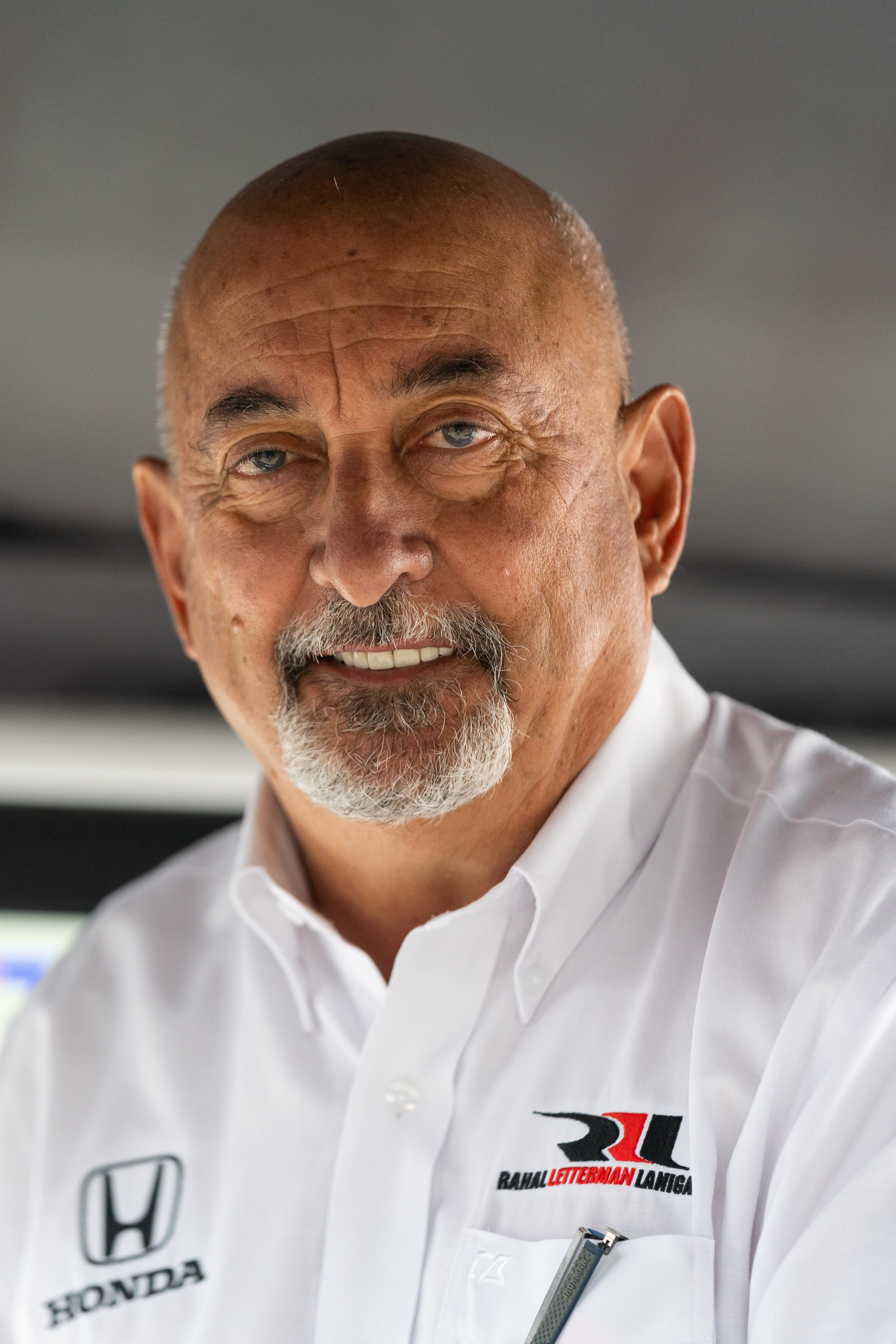
- Rahal in 2021
- Born: Robert Woodward Rahal; January 10, 1953 (age 73) Medina, Ohio, U.S.

Championship titles
- CART Championship Car (1986, 1987, 1992); Major victories 24 Hours of Daytona (1981); Indianapolis 500 (1986); 12 Hours of Sebring (1987); Pocono 500 (1988)

Champ Car career
- 265 races run over 17 years
- Best finish: 1st (1986, 1987, 1992)
- First race: 1982 Kraco Car Stereo 150 (Phoenix)
- Last race: 1998 Marlboro 500 (Fontana)
- First win: 1982 Cleveland Grand Prix (Cleveland)
- Last win: 1992 Bosch Spark Plug Grand Prix (Nazareth)
Wins	Podiums	Poles
24	88	17

Formula One World Championship career
- Nationality: (United States) American
- Active years: 1978
- Team: Wolf
- Entries: 2
- Championships: 0
- Wins: 0
- Podiums: 0
- Career points: 0
- Pole positions: 0
- Fastest laps: 0
- First entry: 1978 United States Grand Prix
- Last entry: 1978 Canadian Grand Prix

NASCAR Cup Series career
- 1 race run over 1 year
- Best finish: 91st (1984)
- First race: 1984 Winston Western 500 (Riverside)
Wins	Top tens	Poles
0	0	0

24 Hours of Le Mans career
- Years: 1980, 1982
- Teams: Barbour, Garretson
- Best finish: DNF (1980, 1982)
- Class wins: 0

Robert Woodward Rahal (/ˈreɪhɔːl/ RAY-hawl; born January 10, 1953) is an American racing driver and motorsports executive. As a driver, he won three championships and 24 races in the CART open-wheel series, including the 1986 Indianapolis 500. As co-owner of Rahal Letterman Lanigan Racing, he won the Indianapolis 500 in 2004 and 2020 with drivers Buddy Rice and Takuma Sato, respectively.

After retiring as a driver, Rahal held managerial positions with the Jaguar Formula 1 team and also was an interim president of the CART series. Rahal was also a sports car driver during the 1980s, and made one NASCAR start for the Wood Brothers.

== Racing career ==
And it was frigid. A very cold day, and the race long – long for me. The longest I'd done before that was a 100-mile Formula Atlantic race, and this was a 200-mile grand prix. I just wanted to get to the end and get to the next race. It was a workman-like debut.

— Rahal, speaking about his Formula One debut at Watkins Glen

=== 1970s ===
Rahal began his career in SCCA feeder categories, eventually finishing second to Gilles Villeneuve in the 1977 Formula Atlantic championship. The following year, he competed in the 1978 New Zealand Grand Prix with Fred Opert Racing (Formula Pacific) and in European Formula Three with Wolf Racing. Near the end of the season, Rahal raced for the Wolf Formula 1 team in the 1978 United States Grand Prix and the 1978 Canadian Grand Prix. The deal with Wolf did not continue into the 1979 season, as Wolf signed up James Hunt for the one and only car available. Rahal began the 1979 racing a Chevron in Formula Two, but returned to America mid-season and raced in the Can-Am series. During the next few seasons, he competed in various sports car events, including the 24 Hours of Le Mans and the IMSA GT Championship.

=== 1980s ===
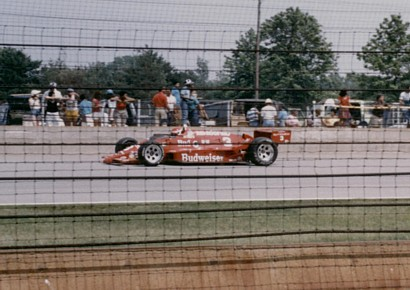
Rahal during the 1986 Indianapolis 500

In 1982, Rahal entered the CART Indy car series with the Truesports team, winning two races and finishing second in the championship behind Rick Mears. He continued racing for Truesports through the 1988 season, winning at least one race every year. In 1986, Rahal dramatically passed Kevin Cogan on a restart with two laps to go to win the Indianapolis 500, only days before his team owner, Jim Trueman died of cancer. Later that year, Rahal won his first CART championship, and successfully defended it the following year.

In 1988, Rahal won the last race the Truesports team ever won, the Quaker State 500 at Pocono, the first and only Indy car victory for the Judd engine.

During his CART career, Rahal also won races in IMSA and IROC. By 1989, Rahal had ended his occasional forays into sports car racing and focused solely on CART. He moved over to the Kraco race team, but this association produced only two wins over three seasons.

Rahal competed in one NASCAR race in his career. In November 1984, he drove the 7-11 sponsored Wood Brothers Racing No. 21 Ford (substituting for Buddy Baker) to a 40th-place finish in the Winston Western 500 at Riverside International Speedway, completing only 44 laps before breaking a rear end gear.

== IndyCar owner and driver ==
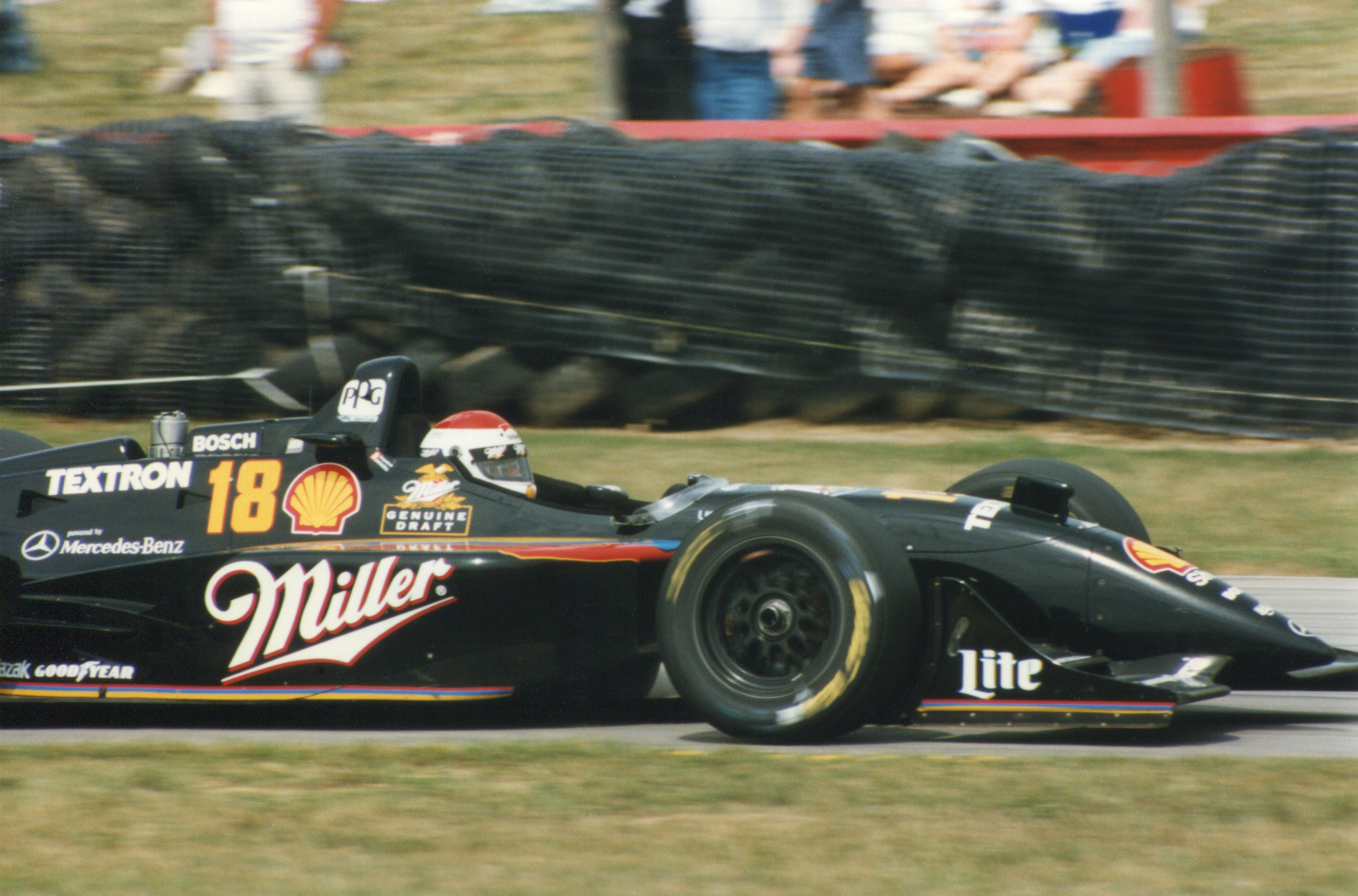
Rahal driving for Team Rahal at Mid-Ohio Sports Car Course in 1996

After losing the championship to Michael Andretti in 1991, Rahal (with partner Carl Hogan) acquired the assets to the former Pat Patrick Racing team, with Rahal becoming an owner-driver. The team was an immediate success in 1992, producing four wins for Rahal and his third CART championship, making him the last owner-driver to win the CART title, and the last driver to win a race with his own team until Adrian Fernandez did so in 2003. In 1993, Rahal attempted to develop his own Rahal-Hogan chassis, but reverted to the Lola chassis after failing to qualify for the 1993 Indianapolis 500. In 1994, the team brought the Honda engine into the CART series. Except for a second-place finish at Toronto, he and teammate Mike Groff struggled to show the full potential of an engine that would soon dominate the series. In 1995 at Long Beach, Rahal became the tenth driver in Championship Car history (including AAA, USAC, and CART) to start 200 races in his career. Despite no wins, Rahal finished a strong third in the 1995 standings using the Mercedes engine.

Rahal continued as a racing driver until his retirement in 1998. Meanwhile, Hogan left to form his own team and talk show host David Letterman became a minority owner in 1996. The team became known as Team Rahal in 1996 and Rahal Letterman Racing in 2004, when Rahal switched from CART to the IRL full-time.

== Other business roles ==
=== Motorsports ===
From 1997 to 1999, Rahal co-owned a team in the NASCAR Craftsman Truck Series with sportscar-racing veteran Tom Gloy. The team, called Gloy-Rahal Racing, competed part time in 1997 and full time for the remainder of existence.

In 2000, Rahal joined the Jaguar Formula One team in a managerial capacity. During this time, Rahal attempted to hire championship-winning aerodynamicist Adrian Newey, briefly believing that the deal had been completed, but was unsuccessful. However, Rahal was fired after reportedly attempting to sell driver Eddie Irvine to rivals Jordan. Ironically, the team fired Irvine little more than a year after firing Rahal, while Newey joined in 2006, a year after the team was sold to Red Bull.

Rahal was the interim President and CEO of CART for six months during the 2000 season.

In 2021, Rahal began to venture into race promoting with the help of former IndyCar and Indianapolis Motor Speedway owner Tony George. Rahal's first move in race promotion was to return the popular Iowa Speedway round to IndyCar after it had been left off of the 2021 calendar. Rahal was able to recruit Iowa supermarket chain Hy-Vee as a sponsor and secured a multi year agreement between IndyCar and Iowa Speedway to run a double header event at the track starting in 2022.

=== Automobile dealerships ===
Rahal co-founded Bobby Rahal Automotive Group in 1989 with business partner Ron Ferris. Their first dealership was a Honda store in Mechanicsburg, Pennsylvania. Today, the company has 12 Pennsylvania dealerships: four in Mechanicsburg, four in State College, and one each in Canonsburg, Ephrata, Pittsburgh and Wexford. Dealership franchises include Acura (one location), BMW (two locations), Honda (two locations), Lexus (three locations), Mercedes-Benz (two locations) and Toyota (two locations). It currently ranks 139th in the Automotive News Top 150 Dealership Groups list.

== Awards ==
- International Motorsports Hall of Fame (2004)
- Motorsports Hall of Fame of America (2004)
- SCCA Hall of Fame (2013)
- Indianapolis Motor Speedway Hall of Fame (2014)
- Simeone Foundation Spirit of Competition Award (2014)

== Tribute ==
At WeatherTech Raceway Laguna Seca, the back straight leading up to the corkscrew was named the "Rahal Straight" in his honor.

== Personal life ==
Rahal is the son of Barbara (1927–2016) and Michael (1924–2017) Rahal. His father was of Lebanese descent and his mother of English descent. His father owned a wholesale food distribution business and was an amateur racecar driver. Rahal was raised in the Chicago suburb of Glen Ellyn and attended Glenbard West High School as class of 1971. Rahal is a 1975 graduate of Denison University, where his father also graduated.

Rahal formerly lived in New Albany, Ohio. He now lives in the Lincoln Park neighborhood of Chicago. His son is Graham Rahal, who races in the IndyCar Series.

Rahal owns a 1975 Lola T360 which he occasionally races at vintage racing events.

== Motorsports career results ==
=== SCCA National Championship Runoffs ===
Year	Track	Car	Engine	Class	Finish	Start	Status
1974	Road Atlanta	Lola T290	Ford	B Sports Racing	3	3	Running
1975	Road Atlanta	March 75B	Ford	Formula B	1	2	Running
1977	Road Atlanta	March 75B	Ford	Formula B	18	1	Retired

=== Complete Formula One World Championship results ===
(key) (Races in bold indicate pole position / Races in italics indicate fastest lap)

Formula One results
Year	Entrant	Chassis	Engine	1	2	3	4	5	6	7	8	9	10	11	12	13	14	15	16	WDC	Pts
1978	Walter Wolf Racing	Wolf WR5	Ford Cosworth 3.0 V8	ARG	BRA	RSA	USW	MON	BEL	ESP	SWE	FRA	GBR	GER	AUT	NED	ITA	USA; 12		NC	0
1978	Walter Wolf Racing	Wolf WR1	Ford Cosworth 3.0 V8																CAN; Ret	NC	0

=== Complete European Formula Two Championship results ===
(key) (Races in bold indicate pole position; races in italics indicate fastest lap)

Formula Two results
Year	Entrant	Chassis	Engine	1	2	3	4	5	6	7	8	9	10	11	12	Pos.	Pts
1979	Chevron Racing Team	Chevron B48	Hart	SIL; 4	HOC; 7	THR; 5	NÜR; Ret	VLL; 4	MUG; 6	PAU; Ret	HOC; 6	ZAN; Ret	PER; Ret	MIS; 7	DON	11th	10

=== American Open Wheel Racing ===
(key) (Races in bold indicate pole position)

==== PPG Indy Car Series ====
PPG Indy Car Series results
Year	Team	No.	Chassis	Engine	1	2	3	4	5	6	7	8	9	10	11	12	13	14	15	16	17	18	19	Rank	Points	Ref
1982	Truesports Co.	19	March 82C	Cosworth DFX V8t	PHX; 18	ATL	MIL; 20	CLE; 1	MCH; 3	MIL; 2	POC; 3	RIV; 15	ROA; 3	MCH; 1	PHX; 5									2nd	242	
1983	Truesports Co.	2	March 83C	Cosworth DFX V8t	ATL; 21	INDY; 20	MIL; 6	CLE; 19	MCH; 5	ROA; 10	POC; 5	RIV; 1		**MCH**; 2			PHX; DNS							5th	94	
1983	Truesports Co.	2	March 83C	Chevrolet V8									**MDO**; 3		CPL; 9	LAG; 7								5th	94	
1984	Truesports Co.	5	March 84C	Cosworth DFX V8t	LBH; 14	PHX; 7	INDY; 7	MIL; 14	POR; 14	MEA; 11	CLE; 14	MCH; 18	ROA; 2	POC; 3	MDO; 2	**SAN**; 2	MCH; 5	PHX; 1	LAG; 1	CPL; 7				3rd	137	
1985	Truesports Co.	3	March 85C	Cosworth DFX V8t	LBH; 27	INDY; 27	MIL; 9	POR; 20	MEA; 25	**CLE**; 28	MCH; 6	ROA; 4	POC; 4	**MDO**; 1	**SAN**; 10	**MCH**; 1	**LAG**; 1	PHX; 6	**MIA**; 2					3rd	133	
1986	Truesports Co.	3	March 86C	Cosworth DFX V8t	PHX; 16	LBH; 18	INDY; 1	MIL; 6	POR; 20	MEA; 3	CLE; 15	TOR; 1	MCH; 10	POC; 14	MDO; 1	SAN; 1	MCH; 1	**ROA**; 5	LAG; 1	**PHX**; 3	MIA; 8			1st	179	
1987	Truesports Co.	1	Lola T87/00	Cosworth DFX V8t	LBH; 24	PHX; 2	INDY; 26	MIL; 2	POR; 1	MEA; 1	CLE; 2	**TOR**; 3	MCH; 3	POC; 5	ROA; 23	MDO; 2	NAZ; 2	LAG; 1	MIA; 7					1st	188	
1988	Truesports Co.	1	Lola T88/00	Judd AV V8t	PHX; 16	LBH; 2	INDY; 5	MIL; 6	POR; 12	CLE; 2	TOR; 5	MEA; 5	MCH; 2	POC; 1	MDO; 18	ROA; 2	NAZ; 12	LAG; 4	MIA; 18					3rd	136	
1989	Kraco Racing	18	Lola T89/00	Cosworth DFS V8t	PHX; 18	LBH; 4	INDY; 26	MIL; 13	DET; 18	POR; 2	CLE; 3	MEA; 1	TOR; 19	MCH; 9	POC; 6	MDO; 22	ROA; 28	NAZ; 7	LAG; 6					9th	88	
1990	Galles-Kraco Racing	18	Lola T90/00	Chevrolet 265A V8t	PHX; 2	LBH; 12	INDY; 2	MIL; 4	DET; 2	POR; 11	CLE; 2	MEA; 25	TOR; 22	MCH; 2	DEN; 3	VAN; 8	MDO; 6	ROA; 7	**NAZ**; 3	LAG; 5				4th	153	
1991	Galles-Kraco Racing	18	Lola T91/00	Chevrolet 265A V8t	SRF; 2	LBH; 2	PHX; 2	INDY; 19	MIL; 4	DET; 2	POR; 3	CLE; 3	MEA; 1	TOR; 3	MCH; 11	DEN; 20	VAN; 2	MDO; 3	**ROA**; 4	NAZ; 2	LAG; 24			2nd	200	
1992	Rahal-Hogan Racing	12	Lola T92/00	Chevrolet 265A V8t	SRF; 3	PHX; 1	LBH; 2	INDY; 6	DET; 1	POR; 14	**MIL**; 2	**NHA**; 1	**TOR**; 2	MCH; 11	CLE; 4	ROA; 3	VAN; 22	MDO; 24	NAZ; 1	LAG; 3				1st	196	
1993	Rahal-Hogan Racing	1	Rahal-Hogan RH-001	Chevrolet 265C V8t	SRF; 6	PHX; 22	LBH; 2	INDY; DNQ																4th	133	
1993	Rahal-Hogan Racing	1	Lola T93/00	Chevrolet 265C V8t					MIL; 4	DET; 5	POR; 4	CLE; 28	TOR; 4	MCH; 9	NHA; 7	ROA; 3	VAN; 2	MDO; 6	NAZ; 6	LAG; 7				4th	133	
1994	Rahal-Hogan Racing	4	Lola T94/00	Honda HRX V8t	SRF; 26	PHX; 14	LBH; 30		MIL; 7	DET; 6	POR; 12	CLE; 28	TOR; 2	MCH; 28	MDO; 27	NHA; 9	VAN; 7	ROA; 9	NAZ; 14	LAG; 29				10th	59	
1994	Rahal-Hogan Racing	4	Penske PC-22	Ilmor 265D V8t				INDY; 3																10th	59	
1995	Rahal-Hogan Racing	9	Lola T95/00	Mercedes-Benz IC108B V8t	MIA; 3	SRF; 2	PHX; 21	LBH; 21	NAZ; 6	INDY; 3	MIL; 13	DET; 24	POR; 3	ROA; 5	TOR; 2	CLE; 4	MCH; 8	MDO; 26	NHA; 10	VAN; 5	LAG; 7			3rd	128	
1996	Team Rahal	18	Reynard 96i	Mercedes-Benz IC108C V8t	MIA; 5	RIO; 6	SRF; 20	LBH; 14	NAZ; 6	500; 19	MIL; 7	DET; 21	POR; 6	CLE; 15	TOR; 3	MCH; 24	MDO; 5	ROA; 2	VAN; 2	LAG; 7				7th	102	
1997	Team Rahal	7	Reynard 97i	Ford XD V8t	MIA; 16	SRF; 10	LBH; 10	NAZ; 6	RIO; 10	GAT; 20	MIL; 11	DET; 9	POR; 24	CLE; 5	TOR; 9	MCH; 17	MDO; 3	ROA; 6	VAN; 24	LAG; 19	FON; 5			12th	70	
1998	Team Rahal	7	Reynard 98i	Ford XD V8t	MIA; 19	MOT; 17	LBH; 17	NAZ; 6	RIO; 8	GAT; 8	MIL; 5	DET; 11	POR; 6	CLE; 8	TOR; 4	MCH; 7	MDO; 3	ROA; 8	VAN; 25	LAG; 16	HOU; 23	SRF; 25	FON; 11	10th	82	

==== Indianapolis 500 results ====
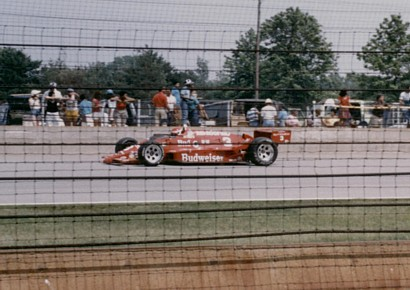
Rahal during the 1986 Indy 500

Year	Chassis	Engine	Start	Finish	Team
1982	March	Cosworth	17th	11th	Truesports
1983	March	Cosworth	6th	20th	Truesports
1984	March	Cosworth	18th	7th	Truesports
1985	March	Cosworth	3rd	27th	Truesports
1986	March	Cosworth	4th	**1st**	Truesports
1987	Lola	Cosworth	2nd	26th	Truesports
1988	Lola	Judd	19th	5th	Truesports
1989	Lola	Cosworth	7th	26th	Kraco
1990	Lola	Chevrolet	4th	**2nd**	Galles/Kraco
1991	Lola	Chevrolet	4th	19th	Galles/Kraco
1992	Lola	Chevrolet	10th	6th	Rahal/Hogan
1993	Rahal	Chevrolet	Failed to Qualify		Rahal/Hogan
1994	Penske	Ilmor	28th	**3rd**	Rahal/Hogan
1995	Lola	Ilmor-Mercedes	21st	**3rd**	Rahal/Hogan

=== NASCAR ===
(key) (Bold – Pole position awarded by qualifying time. Italics – Pole position earned by points standings or practice time. * – Most laps led.)

==== Winston Cup Series ====
NASCAR Winston Cup Series results
Year	Team	No.	Make	1	2	3	4	5	6	7	8	9	10	11	12	13	14	15	16	17	18	19	20	21	22	23	24	25	26	27	28	29	30	NWCC	Pts	Ref
1984	Wood Brothers Racing	21	Ford	DAY	RCH	CAR	ATL	BRI	NWS	DAR	MAR	TAL	NSV	DOV	CLT	RSD	POC	MCH	DAY	NSV	POC	TAL	MCH	BRI	DAR	RCH	DOV	MAR	CLT	NWS	CAR	ATL	RSD; 40	91st	43	

=== 24 Hours of Le Mans results ===
Year	Team	Co-Drivers	Car	Class	Laps	Pos.	Class Pos.
1980	(United States) Dick Barbour Racing	(United States) Bob Garretson (Canada) Allan Moffat	Porsche 935 K3	IMSA	134	DNF	DNF
1982	(United States) Garretson Developments	(United States) Skeeter McKitterick (United States) Jim Trueman	March 82G	C	28	DNF	DNF

Sporting positions
Preceded by Al Unser	CART Indy Car Series; Champion; 1986, 1987	Succeeded by Danny Sullivan
Preceded by Danny Sullivan	Indianapolis 500; Winner; 1986	Succeeded by Al Unser
Preceded by Michael Andretti	CART Indy Car Series; Champion; 1992	Succeeded by Nigel Mansell
Achievements
Preceded by Bob Lazier	CART; Rookie of the Year; 1982	Succeeded by Teo Fabi
