= 1978 United States Grand Prix =

- Race 15 of 16 in the 1978 Formula One season
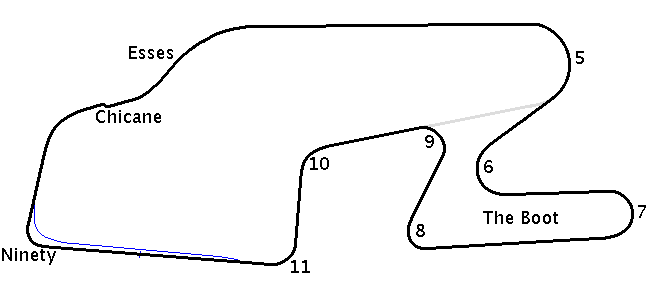

Race details
- Date: October 1, 1978
- Official name: XXI Toyota Grand Prix of the United States
- Location: Watkins Glen Grand Prix Race Course; Watkins Glen, New York
- Course: Permanent road course
- Course length: 5.435 km (3.377 miles)
- Distance: 59 laps, 320.67 km (199.24 miles)
- Weather: Cloudy, dry

Pole position
Driver	(United States) Mario Andretti	Lotus-Ford
- Time: 1:38.114

Fastest lap
Driver	(France) Jean-Pierre Jarier	Lotus-Ford
- Time: 1:39.557 on lap 55

Podium
First	(Argentina) Carlos Reutemann	Ferrari
Second	(Australia) Alan Jones	Williams-Ford
Third	(South Africa) Jody Scheckter	Wolf-Ford

The 1978 United States Grand Prix was a Formula One motor race held on October 1, 1978, at the Watkins Glen Grand Prix Race Course in Watkins Glen, New York. This event was also referred to as the United States Grand Prix East in order to distinguish it from the United States Grand Prix West held on April 2, 1978, in Long Beach, California.

At the preceding Italian Grand Prix, Mario Andretti had secured the driver's championship. At Watkins Glen, Andretti put his Lotus 79 on the pole before a record crowd of over 150,000 fans, but Ferrari's Carlos Reutemann completed a sweep of the two United States races in 1978 by finishing 19 seconds ahead of Australian Alan Jones. Andretti developed brake problems early on and would retire with a blown engine.

== Summary ==
=== Background and practice sessions ===
Ronnie Peterson had been killed following a multiple car pile-up at the Italian Grand Prix. Following the race, the Grand Prix Drivers' Association (GPDA) had a meeting centering on Riccardo Patrese, who the GPDA blamed for the crash. The GPDA filed an injunction to bar Patrese from participating in the 1978 United States Grand Prix weekend, which was allowed. Patrese, who believed that he was not to blame for the fatal accident at Monza, was furious at this action taken, and he tried unsuccessfully to stop the race from taking place.

Replacing the late Peterson for this race and the next one in Canada was Jean-Pierre Jarier.

Friday was warm and sunny, and Andretti set a new track record of 1:39.82. He later lowered that to 1:38.92, ahead of the Ferraris of Reutemann and Canadian rookie Gilles Villeneuve, then the two Brabhams of Niki Lauda and John Watson. American Brett Lunger, about to drive in his last Formula One race, was at the wheel of an Ensign for the first time, after his McLaren was damaged in the opening lap crash at Monza that claimed the life of Peterson. Bobby Rahal had been enlisted from Formula Atlantic to partner Jody Scheckter, as Canadian Walter Wolf was running two cars for the first time.

Starting carefully in his first F1 drive, Rahal took more than a second off his lap time in the Friday afternoon session, then another half-second on Saturday and qualified 20th. High winds on Saturday meant that only eight drivers improved their times, with Alan Jones jumping up to third spot on his last lap. Despite the wind, Andretti improved his pace-setting time to 1:38.114, more than a second ahead of Reutemann.

After Friday's qualifying, Andretti had been so pleased with his car that he said, "We don't know any more that we can do. She is so right. What can I say?" Race organizers feared that an Andretti win would trigger pandemonium in the massive crowd, and they had Mario and his wife, Dee Ann, pose for photos on the podium with the winner's trophy before the race.

=== Race ===
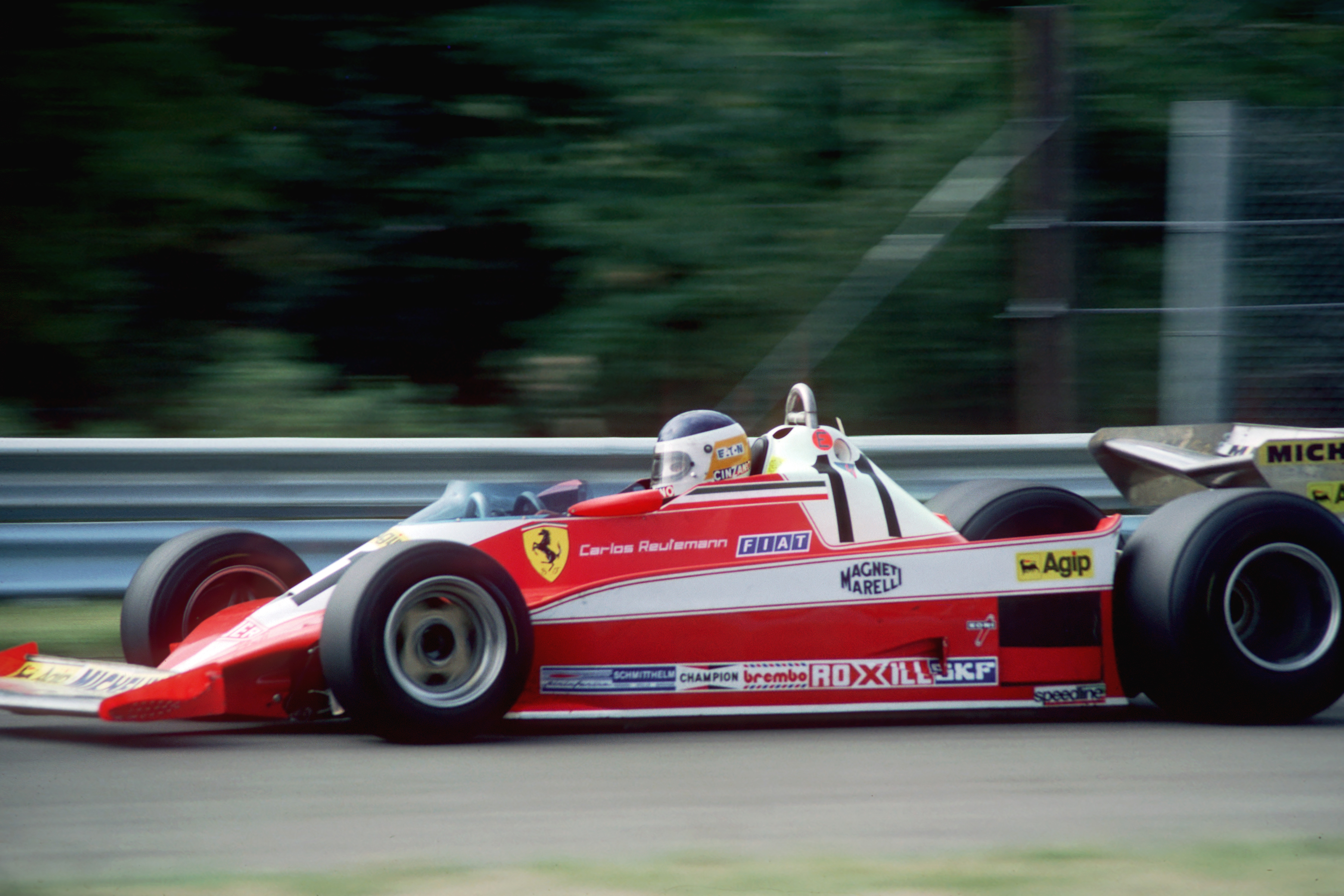
The race was won by Scuderia Ferrari driver Carlos Reutemann

Sunday produced threatening skies, but no rain. On the last lap of the morning warm-up, the rear stub axle on Andretti's Lotus broke in the left-hander entering The Anvil (nicknamed "Ickx's Corner" after a crash the Belgian had there in 1976). The car spun several times and then hit the barrier, knocking off a rear wheel. Faulty material in the part was blamed, and, with no time to test the spare car, Andretti used his teammate Jean-Pierre Jarier's car for the race.

At the start, Andretti took the lead, while Emerson Fittipaldi and Héctor Rebaque (in 13th and 23rd places) both immediately burned out their clutches. Rebaque's race was over, but Fittipaldi managed to get his car in gear, nursed it around for a lap while it cooled off, and then drove through the field to finish fifth.

After one lap, Andretti had a four car-length lead over Reutemann and Villeneuve. They were followed by Jones, Lauda, Jarier, Hunt, Watson and Scheckter. Knowing the car had a brake problem, Andretti was hoping he could cope with it, as he had at Monza. Immediately, his lead began to disintegrate. On lap three, Reutemann went by, and on lap four, Villeneuve. As the Ferraris pulled away, Jarier came in on lap 11 from 11th place to change a deflating front tire. After going back out, the car was still bottoming, but once his fuel load lightened, he set the race's fastest lap, which would have qualified him third.

Nearing the halfway point, the Ferraris were running first and second. Then, on lap 23, Villeneuve's engine blew a piston, and Jones, who had overtaken Andretti two laps earlier, inherited second, 35 seconds behind Reutemann. On lap 25, Lauda passed Andretti for third, and three laps later, Andretti's engine blew. Scheckter and Jean-Pierre Jabouille's Renault were battling for fourth, which became third when Lauda also blew up just a lap after Andretti. Jarier was immediately behind them and closing rapidly.

When Jabouille ran into brake trouble, he was caught by both Scheckter and Jarier. Jarier went by both of them to take third, while Scheckter also passed Jabouille to regain fourth. Jarier's race ended with three and a half laps to go when he ran out of fuel, giving Scheckter the final podium position. Reutemann came home almost twenty seconds ahead of Jones to take the eighth Grand Prix win of his career, the third in the US. Jabouille's fourth place scored the first points for Renault and the first for a turbocharged engine; within a few years, turbocharged engines dominated Formula One.

== Classification ==
=== Qualifying ===
Pos.	Driver	Constructor	Time/Gap
1	(United States) Mario Andretti	Lotus–Ford	1:38.114
2	(Argentina) Carlos Reutemann	Ferrari	+1.065
3	(Australia) Alan Jones	Williams–Ford	+1.628
4	(Canada) Gilles Villeneuve	Ferrari	+1.706
5	(Austria) Niki Lauda	Brabham–Alfa Romeo	+1.868
6	(United Kingdom) James Hunt	McLaren–Ford	+1.877
7	(United Kingdom) John Watson	Brabham–Alfa Romeo	+1.886
8	(France) Jean-Pierre Jarier	Lotus–Ford	+1.920
9	(France) Jean-Pierre Jabouille	Renault	+2.022
10	(France) Jacques Laffite	Ligier–Matra	+2.114
11	(South Africa) Jody Scheckter	Wolf–Ford	+2.648
12	(France) Patrick Depailler	Tyrrell–Ford	+2.714
13	(Brazil) Emerson Fittipaldi	Fittipaldi–Ford	+2.893
14	(West Germany) Hans-Joachim Stuck	Shadow–Ford	+3.567
15	(Finland) Keke Rosberg	ATS–Ford	+3.659
16	(France) Didier Pironi	Tyrrell–Ford	+3.701
17	(Switzerland) Clay Regazzoni	Shadow–Ford	+3.741
18	(France) Patrick Tambay	McLaren–Ford	+3.860
19	(Republic of Ireland) Derek Daly	Ensign–Ford	+4.065
20	(United States) Bobby Rahal	Wolf–Ford	+4.315
21	(France) René Arnoux	Surtees–Ford	+4.427
22	(West Germany) Rolf Stommelen	Arrows–Ford	+4.627
23	(Mexico) Héctor Rebaque	Lotus–Ford	+4.914
24	(United States) Brett Lunger	Ensign–Ford	+4.953
25	(Netherlands) Michael Bleekemolen	ATS–Ford	+5.458
26	(Italy) Arturo Merzario	Merzario–Ford	+6.172
27	(Italy) Beppe Gabbiani	Surtees–Ford	+7.041

*Positions in red indicate entries that failed to qualify.

=== Race ===
Pos	No	Driver	Constructor	Tyre	Laps	Time/Retired	Grid	Points
1	11	(Argentina) Carlos Reutemann	Ferrari	MI	59	1:40:48.800	2	9
2	27	(Australia) Alan Jones	Williams-Ford	G	59	+19.739 secs	3	6
3	20	(South Africa) Jody Scheckter	Wolf-Ford	G	59	+45.701 secs	11	4
4	15	(France) Jean-Pierre Jabouille	Renault	MI	59	+1:25.007	9	3
5	14	(Brazil) Emerson Fittipaldi	Fittipaldi-Ford	G	59	+1:28.089	13	2
6	8	(France) Patrick Tambay	McLaren-Ford	G	59	+1:50.210	18	1
7	7	(United Kingdom) James Hunt	McLaren-Ford	G	58	+1 Lap	6	
8	22	(Republic of Ireland) Derek Daly	Ensign-Ford	G	58	+1 Lap	19	
9	18	(France) René Arnoux	Surtees-Ford	G	58	+1 Lap	21	
10	3	(France) Didier Pironi	Tyrrell-Ford	G	58	+1 Lap	16	
11	26	(France) Jacques Laffite	Ligier-Matra	G	58	+1 Lap	10	
12	21	(United States) Bobby Rahal	Wolf-Ford	G	58	+1 Lap	20	
13	23	(United States) Brett Lunger	Ensign-Ford	G	58	+1 Lap	24	
14	17	(Switzerland) Clay Regazzoni	Shadow-Ford	G	56	+3 Laps	17	
15	55	(France) Jean-Pierre Jarier	Lotus-Ford	G	55	Out of Fuel	8	
16	36	(West Germany) Rolf Stommelen	Arrows-Ford	G	54	+5 Laps	22	
Ret	37	(Italy) Arturo Merzario	Merzario-Ford	G	46	Gearbox	26	
Ret	9	(Netherlands) Michael Bleekemolen	ATS-Ford	G	43	Oil Leak	25	
Ret	1	(Austria) Niki Lauda	Brabham-Alfa Romeo	G	28	Engine	5	
Ret	5	(United States) Mario Andretti	Lotus-Ford	G	27	Engine	1	
Ret	2	(United Kingdom) John Watson	Brabham-Alfa Romeo	G	25	Engine	7	
Ret	4	(France) Patrick Depailler	Tyrrell-Ford	G	23	Wheel	12	
Ret	12	(Canada) Gilles Villeneuve	Ferrari	MI	22	Engine	4	
Ret	10	(Finland) Keke Rosberg	ATS-Ford	G	21	Transmission	15	
Ret	16	(West Germany) Hans-Joachim Stuck	Shadow-Ford	G	1	Fuel System	14	
Ret	25	(Mexico) Héctor Rebaque	Lotus-Ford	G	0	Clutch	23	
DNQ	19	(Italy) Beppe Gabbiani	Surtees-Ford	G				

== Notes ==
- This was the Formula One World Championship debut for Italian driver Beppe Gabbiani and American driver Bobby Rahal.
- This was the 1st podium finish for Williams.

== Championship standings after the race ==
Drivers' Championship standings

	Pos	Driver	Points
	1	(United States) **Mario Andretti**	64
	2	(Sweden) Ronnie Peterson	51
1	3	(Argentina) Carlos Reutemann	44
1	4	(Austria) Niki Lauda	44
	5	(France) Patrick Depailler	32

Constructors' Championship standings

Pos	Constructor	Points
1	(United Kingdom) **Lotus-Ford**	86
2	(United Kingdom) Brabham-Alfa Romeo	53
3	(Italy) Ferrari	49
4	(United Kingdom) Tyrrell-Ford	36
5	(France) Ligier-Matra	19

- Note: Only the top five positions are included for both sets of standings.
- Bold text indicates the 1978 World Champions.

Previous race: 1978 Italian Grand Prix	FIA Formula One World Championship; 1978 season	Next race: 1978 Canadian Grand Prix
Previous race: 1977 United States Grand Prix	United States Grand Prix	Next race: 1979 United States Grand Prix
