= Fred Opert =

American racing driver, car dealer and motorsport team owner

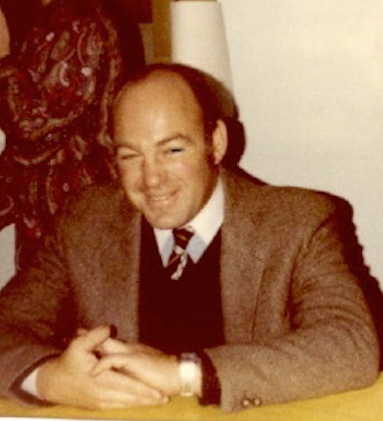
- Opert at a social function in the 1970s
- Nationality: American
- Born: May 25, 1939 Worcester, Massachusetts, U.S.
- Died: August 9, 2016 (aged 77) Ramsey, New Jersey, U.S.
- Retired: 1973
- Debut season: 1959
- Teams: Fred Opert Racing; Carl Haas Automobiles

Previous series
- 1964–65 1966–70 1966–69 1967–1968 1967–69 1969: SCCA Regional; 24 Hours of Daytona; 12 Hours of Sebring; Formula A Trans-Am; IMSA/Formula Ford

Frederic Barry Opert (25 May 1939 – 9 August 2016), known as "Fred", was an American racing driver, car dealer, and founder and owner of the Fred Opert Racing team.

As a driver, Opert's race entries included the 24 Hours of Daytona and the 12 Hours of Sebring. His team, Fred Opert Racing, fielded many notable Formula 1 drivers early in their careers including future Formula One World Champions Keke Rosberg, Alan Jones and Alain Prost, as well as future IndyCar champion Bobby Rahal.

== Racing career ==
Opert raced sports cars and single-seater formula cars until 1970. He raced an Austin-Healey Sprite; a Jaguar XK150S; Elva Couriers; Porsche 911s; Chevron Sports cars; Brabham formula cars; and Chevron formula cars. He won the US North Eastern Championship in 1966 and the SCCA North Eastern Division Championship in 1969 driving Brabhams – a BT21A and a BT29, and entered 1969's inaugural IMSA event at Pocono. He also raced in long distance races including the Daytona 24-hour and Sebring 12-hour in 1965, '66, '67 and '68.

== Fred Opert Racing: Formula Atlantic/Pacific/Mondial and Formula 2 ==
Fred Opert Racing
- Founder(s): Fred Opert
- Team principal(s): Fred Opert
- Former series: Formula A Formula Atlantic; Formula Pacific; Formula Mondial; Formula 2

Opert imported British sports and racing cars into the USA from the early sixties until 1978. The models he imported included the Elva Courier; Brabham; Chevron; Titan; Tui; and Tiga.

Opert ran a turnkey racing business where drivers could buy or rent racing cars from him and have them prepared and transported to race meetings by his mechanics. He also ran professional drivers for whom he could attract sponsorship or who brought sponsorship with them. The New York Times wrote that "Opert indicated that the primary reason he began fielding teams was to sell the race cars he imported—Chevron, Titan, Supernova and Brabham" but that 'now' (in 1978) Opert said he was in it “just because of the racing.”

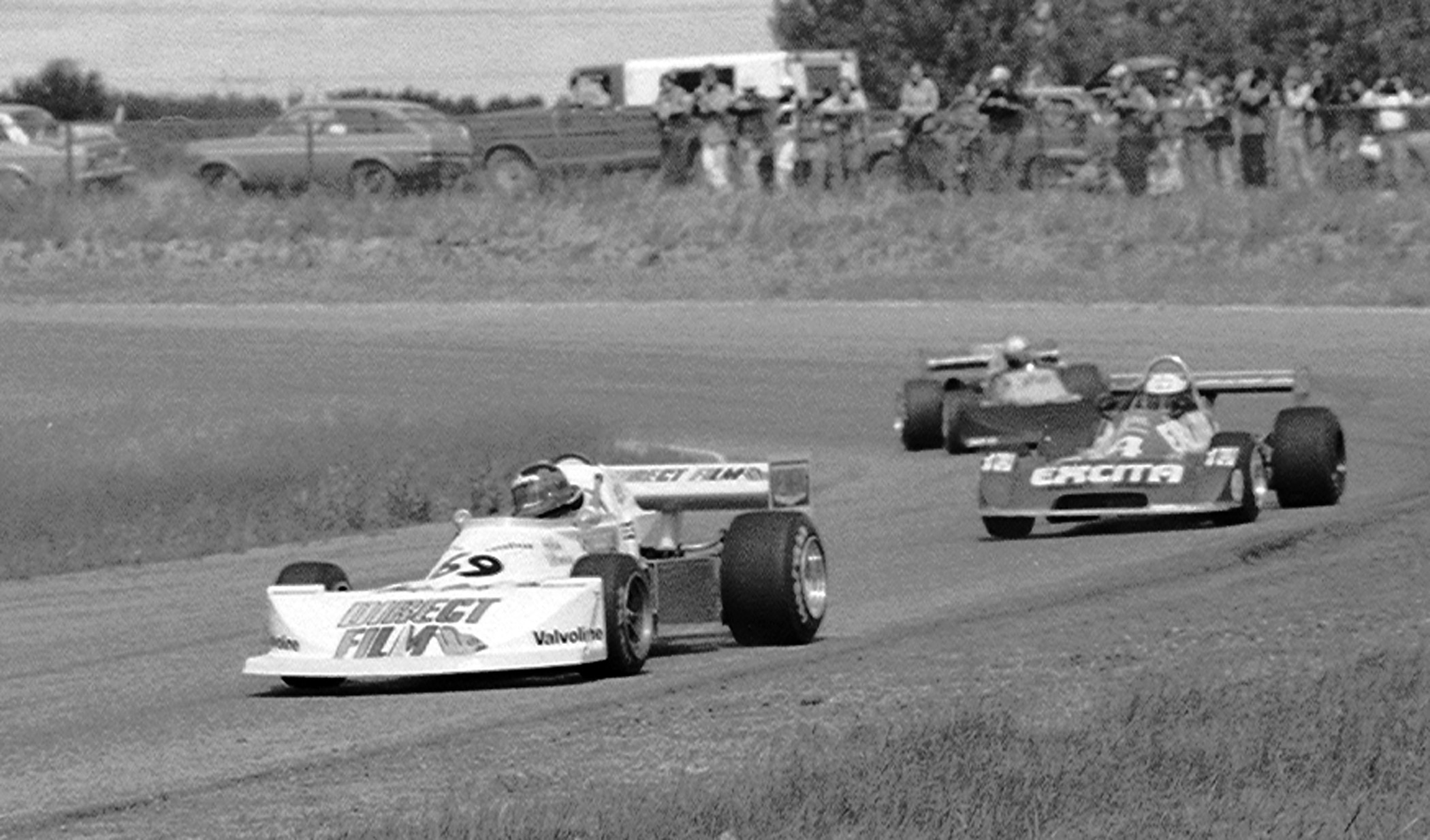
Fred Opert Racing's Keke Rosberg in pursuit of Gilles Villeneuve at the Edmonton International Speedway during the 1977 Formula Atlantic season

Over fourteen years many future Formula 1 drivers including Alan Jones, Alain Prost, Bobby Rahal, Jacques Laffite, Didier Pironi, Jean-Pierre Jarier, Héctor Rebaque, Rolf Stommelen, Patrick Tambay, Peter Gethin, Tom Pryce and Rupert Keegan, all drove for Fred Opert Racing. Keke Rosberg was the driver whose name is most often linked with Opert as the American funded the Finn's racing in Formula Pacific, Formula Atlantic and Formula 2.

Fred Opert Racing competed in the USA; Canada; Argentina; Colombia; Venezuela; Mexico; New Zealand; Japan; Macau; and many European countries. The Argentinian races were F2 Temporada in 1978 where Opert ran Rosberg in a Chevron B42.

== Fred Opert Racing School ==
Opert established one of the USA's first motor racing schools in 1971. The school was at Bridgehampton and the first instructor was New Zealand racing driver Bert Hawthorne. An advertorial for the school appeared in the New York Magazine on 10 April 1972, four days before Hawthorne was killed racing at Hockenheim. Mexican Freddy van Beuren took over after Hawthorne's death.

The school moved to Pocono in 1973 when the Bridgehampton track was sold to property developers. After the school moved an advertorial appeared in the June 1973 edition of Popular Mechanics. When van Beuren returned to Mexico, Swedish driver Bertil Roos became the chief instructor and eventually took over the school and rebranded it under his own name.

== Formula 1 ==
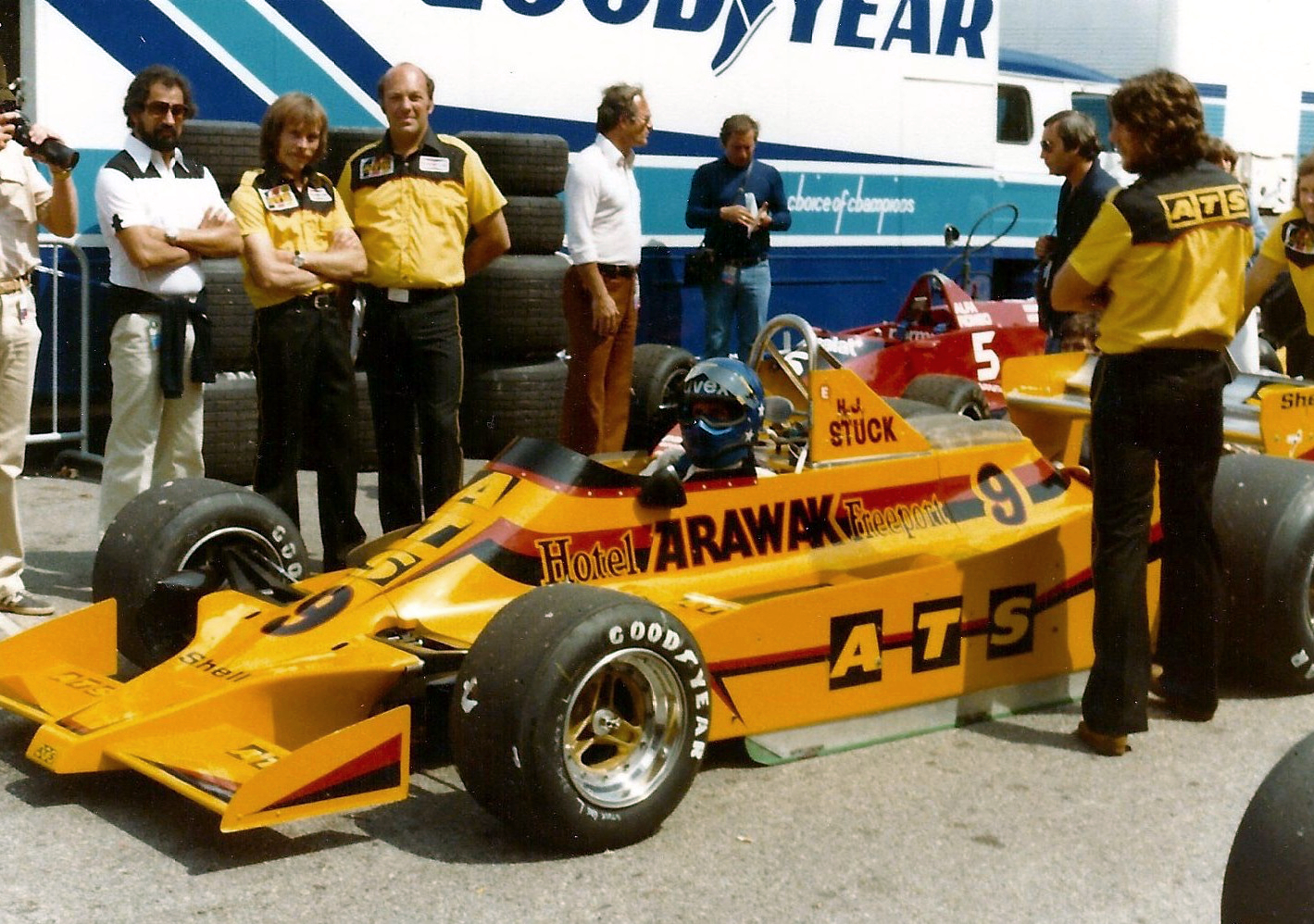
Opert with his ATS F1 Team at the 1979 Monaco Grand Prix

With the demise of Chevron racing cars after the 1978 death of its founder Derek Bennett, Opert gave up running his own teams and took on the role of Team Manager with the ATS Formula 1 team, a "notorious" job - according to Motor Sport magazine - with "the highest turnover in motorsport".

Opert soon became one of many casualties at ATS, resigning after the 1979 French Grand Prix following team owner Günter Schmid's decision to pull the ATS car from the race.

== Return to team ownership ==
Opert returned briefly and tragically to team ownership in 1983 when he put together a Formula Atlantic team for his friend Olivier Chandon de Brailles. Chandon was killed when he was testing an Opert Ralt Formula Atlantic car at Moroso Motorsports Park (now Palm Beach International Raceway) in Florida, preparing for the WCAR Formula Atlantic (Mondial) Championship that would start in April.

== Later years ==
Opert turned his back on motorsport after the 1983 death of Chandon in one of his cars. Later in his life he took an active interest in Nico Rosberg's career, attending F1 races to follow Rosberg's fortunes. He died not long after attending the Hungarian Grand Prix, then visiting Germany but missing 2016 German Grand Prix because he was too ill. Later that year Nico Rosberg won the World Championship title.
