= Rahal (clan) =

Clan of Jats of Punjab

Rahal (Punjabi: ਰਾਹਲ) are clan found among the Punjabi Jatt. The progenitor of these families are believed to have been born in (Reh). This clan believes in Sikhism. The main villages are Mangewal (ਮਾਗੇਵਾਲ), Halotali, Malewal, Bhadalthuha, Raisal, Kalshna, Sudhewal, Ghundar, Dargapur, Ghullumajra, Kachwi ਕੱਛਵੀ and Haibatpur, Nainowal Jattan,ਨੈਨੋਵਾਲ ਜੱਟਾਂ(Hoshiarpur), Dhugga, ਧੁੱਗਾ, Dada,ਦਾਦਾ (Hoshiarpur)which all are in the district Patiala, and Nainowal Jattan[Hoshiarpur] villages surrounding Hoshiarpur and Nabha in the Punjab. Some people from this clan have migrated to countries like Canada, London, USA, etc.
