= Rahal =

Rahal may refer to:

== People with surname Rahal ==
- Bashar Rahal (born 1974), actor
- Bobby Rahal (born 1953), race car driver mainly known for American open-wheel racing including the Indianapolis 500
- Graham Rahal (born 1989), race car driver mainly known for American open-wheel racing and son of Bobby Rahal
- Nick Rahall (born 1949), U.S. politician from West Virginia, Democratic party member of House of Representatives
- Sabrina Sato or Sabrina Sato Rahal (born 1981), Brazilian television celebrity

== Places ==
- Rahal Rural District, West Azerbaijan Province, Iran
- Rahal, Iran, an Iranian village
- Paola, Malta (Maltese: Raħal Ġdid), a town in Malta

== Other uses ==
- Rahal clan, a clan found among the Jats of Punjab, India
- Rahal Letterman Lanigan Racing, American open-wheel racing team
