= Olivier Chandon de Brailles =

French racing driver

- Born: 17 September 1955 France
- Died: 2 March 1983 (aged 27) West Palm Beach, Florida, US

Olivier Hervé Horace Chandon de Brailles (17 September 1955 – 2 March 1983), also called Olivier Chandon, Oliver Chandon de Briailles, and Olivier Chandon Debrailles, was a French race car driver, heir to the Moët et Chandon champagne, and one-time boyfriend of the American model Christie Brinkley.

== Biography ==
Olivier Chandon de Brailles was the only son of Frederic Chandon de Brailles, chairman of the Moët-Hennessy group and heir to the Moët & Chandon champagne fortune.

Chandon spoke five languages, had a second degree black belt in Taekwondo, and was a race car driver and skydiver.

A graduate of Le Rosey in Switzerland, he served in the French Air Force and later moved to New York City. There he attended New York University to study marketing and worked in the sales department of United Technologies. Earlier, he began racing cars in Europe at age 18, whereby he assumed the shortened name of Olivier Chandon. He later resumed his race car career in the United States.

On 2 March 1983, Chandon, a member of the New York-based Fred Opert Racing Team, was killed while driving a Ralt race car in a private practice session at Moroso Motorsports Park in West Palm Beach, Florida, while preparing for the upcoming Formula Atlantic season. While in New York Chandon lived in the Chelsea Hotel.

Travelling over 100 miles per hour, Chandon's vehicle crashed through a barrier, fell into a canal and landed upside down, where he was pinned in his car at the feet and drowned in an otherwise survivable accident. The cause of the accident could not be determined: either the throttle stuck or driver error.

Chandon had a romantic relationship with model Christie Brinkley. The two first met at Studio 54 where she was holding a party to promote her 1982 calendar. They then became an "item" for the gossip magazines. Chandon had phoned her less than an hour before the accident to arrange to meet her in Palm Beach that evening. When told of the accident, a distraught Brinkley stayed in California.

Olivier Chandon is buried in the Laferté-sur-Aube cemetery, in Haute-Marne.
