= 1978 Canadian Grand Prix =

- Race 16 of 16 in the 1978 Formula One season

Race details
- Date: October 8, 1978
- Location: Circuit Île Notre-Dame, Montreal
- Course: Semi-permanent racing facility
- Course length: 4.500 km (2.796 miles)
- Distance: 70 laps, 315.000 km (195.732 miles)
- Weather: Mostly cloudy 5 °C (41 °F)

Pole position
Driver	(France) Jean-Pierre Jarier	Lotus-Ford
- Time: 1:38.015

Fastest lap
Driver	(Australia) Alan Jones	Williams-Ford
- Time: 1:38.072 on lap 70

Podium
First	(Canada) Gilles Villeneuve	Ferrari
Second	(South Africa) Jody Scheckter	Wolf-Ford
Third	(Argentina) Carlos Reutemann	Ferrari

The 1978 Canadian Grand Prix was a Formula One motor race held on 8 October 1978 at Montreal. This was the 16th and final race of the 1978 World Championship of F1 Drivers and the International Cup for F1 Constructors. It was Ferrari driver Gilles Villeneuve's and a Canadian driver's first victory in Formula One.

== Report ==
=== Background ===
The Canadian Grand Prix had moved from the Mosport Park circuit near Toronto to the newly built Circuit Île Notre-Dame in Montreal. The event had moved because of track safety and organization problems with the hilly and scenic Mosport Park track. This circuit, made up entirely of public roads was located on a man-made island in the middle of the St. Lawrence Seaway which was the location of Expo 67 and rowing at the 1976 Summer Olympics.

Before the race, in pre-race interviews Mario Andretti noted that he thought that the circuit had been designed in favour of Gilles Villeneuve, a comment that was picked up by local press. Andretti responded to the comments on race day morning, stating that he was "not critical of the race organizers", but instead "critical of our own FOCA officials who were sent over here to approve the track".

Both championships were already sewn up (in favour of Andretti and Lotus), so this, the final round, was a dead rubber in the 1978 title chase. Before the race, Brabham announced that rising star Brazilian driver Nelson Piquet, who had raced earlier in the season with Ensign and BS Fabrications, would be joining them in a third car, alongside regular drivers Niki Lauda and John Watson. The only other change was that Riccardo Patrese returned to the Arrows cockpit after missing the previous race.

=== Practice and qualifying ===
Poor weather and rain on Friday morning meant that the first practice session began 20 minutes later than scheduled. When the session did start, the two Ferrari drivers were fastest, Carlos Reutemann fastest with a lap of 2:02.600, ahead of teammate Villeneuve. The McLarens struggled in the weather, with Peter Windsor noting that neither car was able to find "decent traction".

The second practice session held on Friday was in damp weather conditions as the track dried, with Reutemann again fastest, with a lap of 1:57.900. Brabham struggled again, as they did in the first session, with Piquet crashing into the wall. Due to their poor Friday, neither car had qualified for the race by the end of Friday's running.

Wet weather greeted the teams again on Saturday morning for a 90-minute practice session, although conditions got better towards the end of that session, allowing Lauda to go fastest with a time of 1:51.700, Keke Rosberg, Andretti and Watson completing the top four.

The entry of 28 cars had to be trimmed to 22 before the race, and those who failed to qualify were, unusually, from six different teams. They were Clay Regazzoni of Shadow, Beppe Gabbiani of Surtees, Arturo Merzario in the car bearing his name, Héctor Rebaque in a privately run Lotus, Rolf Stommelen of Arrows and Michael Bleekemolen of ATS.

There were uncharacteristically bad performances from Reutemann, who took third in the championship with Ferrari, but could only qualify 11th, and the Tyrrells of Patrick Depailler and Didier Pironi, both also regular points scorers but down in 13th and 18th. Piquet was 14th on his debut for Brabham.

The top ten was just as interesting as the bottom six, as eight different cars were featured. Jacques Laffite was the lowest ranked of these, putting his Ligier 10th. World champion Andretti was also off the pace for Lotus, qualifying 9th. Hans-Joachim Stuck drove very well to put the other Shadow 8th, beating his more decorated teammate Regazzoni by over two and a half seconds. Brabham, one of only two teams to have two cars in the top 10 (the other was Lotus), had Watson and Lauda 4th and 7th. They were split by Alan Jones's Williams, a sign of continuing improvement for the team and their Australian driver, who had finished 2nd the last time out at Watkins Glen, and Emerson Fittipaldi, who dragged the uncompetitive Copersucar up to 6th.

Home favourite Villeneuve put the Ferrari 3rd, a good performance from the Canadian who had been outperformed by teammate Reutemann all season. He was beaten to 2nd by Jody Scheckter of Wolf, who had also been improving of late. However, pole was a surprise. Jean-Pierre Jarier, who had fallen out of favour with ATS earlier in the season and been dropped in favour of drivers such as Alberto Colombo, Hans Binder and Harald Ertl, had last been semi-competitive with Shadow back in 1975 and had been drafted in by Lotus to replace Ronnie Peterson after his tragic death at Monza two races previous, took pole by just 0.011 seconds from Scheckter. This was no surprise after the Frenchman had set the fastest race lap in his first appearance for the team at Watkins Glen, but was classified 15th due to running out of fuel when in 3rd place.

=== Race ===
Jarier kept the lead from the start, but Jones had a magnificent start, jumping up from 5th to 2nd. This meant that Scheckter dropped to 3rd, Villeneuve to 4th and Watson down to 5th. Andretti had jumped up past Lauda and Stuck and was holding 6th. Fittipaldi was a casualty on the first lap, sliding off the track into the mud and retiring. Stuck joined him at the same spot a lap later.

There was more drama in the race on lap 6, particularly for the Brabham team. First, Lauda had a brake failure and was out. Shortly afterwards, Andretti attempted to pass Watson in the other Brabham, and the two made contact, dropping almost right to the back of the field. This allowed Patrick Depailler up to 5th and Reutemann in the other Ferrari into 6th. Three laps later, Watson had an accident of his own, and was out for good.

The next retirement was on lap 17, when Bobby Rahal in the second Wolf suffered fuel injection problems and reduced the field to 17 runners.

Jarier had opened up a lead of 20 seconds at this point, as Jones in second was holding up the faster cars of Scheckter and Villeneuve behind him. However, on lap 18 Scheckter found a way past, and Villeneuve followed him through a lap later. At the same time, Depailler was dropping down the order with technical issues, allowing Reutemann into 5th and Derek Daly in the Ensign up to 6th. Daly was passed by Riccardo Patrese not long afterwards.

A good few laps ensued for Ferrari, as on lap 25 the very fast Villeneuve fought his way to 2nd past Scheckter, who everyone knew was to be his teammate at Ferrari in 1979, as Reutemann who had signed for champions Lotus. On lap 27, current teammate Reutemann battled past the slow Jones into fourth. Jones also slipped behind Patrese two laps later.

Daly moved back up to 6th on lap 33 when Jones dropped back even further with his own technical problems, but the Irishman was under severe pressure from Didier Pironi in the other Tyrrell. Lap 38 saw another retirement, that of René Arnoux in the Surtees with oil pressure difficulties.

The recovering Depailler fought his way past first teammate Pironi and then Derek Daly to take back 6th place on laps 47 and 48, just when trouble was beginning for fellow Frenchman Jean-Pierre Jarier, leading the race for Lotus, which first became apparent when Jacques Laffite was able to unlap himself in the Ligier. Three laps later, Jarier was out with no oil pressure. This was tragic for the Frenchman, who was looking certain to take his first victory, but fantastic for the Canadian fans, whose hero Villeneuve now looked set to take his. This allowed Daly back into the points in 6th.

1976 World Champion James Hunt crashed out two laps later, an unhappy end to his last race for McLaren, with whom he had had so much success, as it was known that the following year he would move to Wolf to replace Scheckter. He was followed out of the race by Laffite's Ligier a lap later, who had transmission problems.

From then on, the order did not change, and Villeneuve came home to take his first Grand Prix victory in front of his own fans. He was followed home by his Ferrari teammate for the following year, Jody Scheckter (scoring the last ever podium and points for Walter Wolf Racing) and his current teammate Carlos Reutemann, 13 and 19 seconds behind respectively. Patrese took 4th in a solid and uneventful race, with Depailler's race to fifth anything but uneventful. Derek Daly came home sixth to secure his and Ensign's first ever points finish.

=== Post-race ===
In a blog to mark 30 years since Villeneuve had died, Windsor noted that this race marked the beginning of a "new era", with the "era of chassis design over" and the era of "ground effect" arriving, despite the fact that the race was won by a car without ground effect (Ferrari 312T3) and that the first win by a ground effect car (Lotus 79) happened six months earlier.

== Qualifying ==
=== Qualifying classification ===
Pos.	Driver	Constructor	Time	No
1	Jean-Pierre Jarier	Lotus-Ford	1:38,015	1
2	Jody Scheckter	Wolf-Ford	1:38,026	2
3	Gilles Villeneuve	Ferrari	1:38,230	3
4	John Watson	Brabham-Alfa Romeo	1:38,417	4
5	Alan Jones	Williams-Ford	1:38,861	5
6	Emerson Fittipaldi	Fittipaldi-Ford	1:38,930	6
7	Niki Lauda	Brabham-Alfa Romeo	1:39,020	7
8	Hans-Joachim Stuck	Shadow-Ford	1:39,081	8
9	Mario Andretti	Lotus-Ford	1:39,236	9
10	Jacques Laffite	Ligier-Matra	1:39,381	10
11	Carlos Reutemann	Ferrari	1:39,455	11
12	Riccardo Patrese	Arrows-Ford	1:39,491	12
13	Patrick Depailler	Tyrrell-Ford	1:39,619	13
14	Nelson Piquet	Brabham-Alfa Romeo	1:39,624	14
15	Derek Daly	Ensign-Ford	1:40,042	15
16	René Arnoux	Surtees-Ford	1:40,515	16
17	Patrick Tambay	McLaren-Ford	1:40,669	17
18	Didier Pironi	Tyrrell-Ford	1:40,959	18
19	James Hunt	McLaren-Ford	1:40,970	19
20	Bobby Rahal	Wolf-Ford	1:40,983	20
21	Keke Rosberg	ATS-Ford	1:41,611	21
22	Jean-Pierre Jabouille	Renault	1:41,689	22
23	Clay Regazzoni	Shadow-Ford	1:41,739	DNQ
24	Beppe Gabbiani	Surtees-Ford	1:41,799	DNQ
25	Arturo Merzario	Merzario-Ford	1:41,962	DNQ
26	Héctor Rebaque	Lotus-Ford	1:42,413	DNQ
27	Rolf Stommelen	Arrows-Ford	1:43,267	DNQ
28	Michael Bleekemolen	ATS-Ford	1:45,553	DNQ

*Positions in red indicate entries that failed to qualify.

== Race ==
=== Classification ===
Pos	No	Driver	Constructor	Tyre	Laps	Time/Retired	Grid	Points
1	12	(Canada) Gilles Villeneuve	Ferrari	M	70	1:57:49.196	3	9
2	20	(South Africa) Jody Scheckter	Wolf-Ford	G	70	+13.372	2	6
3	11	(Argentina) Carlos Reutemann	Ferrari	M	70	+19.408	11	4
4	35	(Italy) Riccardo Patrese	Arrows-Ford	G	70	+24.667	12	3
5	4	(France) Patrick Depailler	Tyrrell-Ford	G	70	+28.558	13	2
6	22	(Republic of Ireland) Derek Daly	Ensign-Ford	G	70	+54.476	15	1
7	3	(France) Didier Pironi	Tyrrell-Ford	G	70	+1:21.250	18	
8	8	(France) Patrick Tambay	McLaren-Ford	G	70	+1:26.560	17	
9	27	(Australia) Alan Jones	Williams-Ford	G	70	+1:28.942	5	
10	5	(United States) Mario Andretti	Lotus-Ford	G	69	+1 Lap	9	
11	66	(Brazil) Nelson Piquet	Brabham-Alfa Romeo	G	69	+1 Lap	14	
12	15	(France) Jean-Pierre Jabouille	Renault	M	65	+5 Laps	22	
NC	10	(Finland) Keke Rosberg	ATS-Ford	G	58	+12 Laps	21	
Ret	26	(France) Jacques Laffite	Ligier-Matra	G	52	Transmission	10	
Ret	7	(United Kingdom) James Hunt	McLaren-Ford	G	51	Spun Off	19	
Ret	55	(France) Jean-Pierre Jarier	Lotus-Ford	G	49	Oil Leak	1	
Ret	18	(France) René Arnoux	Surtees-Ford	G	37	Engine	16	
Ret	21	(United States) Bobby Rahal	Wolf-Ford	G	16	Fuel System	20	
Ret	2	(United Kingdom) John Watson	Brabham-Alfa Romeo	G	8	Accident	4	
Ret	1	(Austria) Niki Lauda	Brabham-Alfa Romeo	G	5	Brakes	7	
Ret	16	(West Germany) Hans-Joachim Stuck	Shadow-Ford	G	1	Accident	8	
Ret	14	(Brazil) Emerson Fittipaldi	Fittipaldi-Ford	G	0	Accident	6	
DNQ	17	(Switzerland) Clay Regazzoni	Shadow-Ford	G				
DNQ	19	(Italy) Beppe Gabbiani	Surtees-Ford	G				
DNQ	37	(Italy) Arturo Merzario	Merzario-Ford	G				
DNQ	25	(Mexico) Héctor Rebaque	Lotus-Ford	G				
DNQ	36	(West Germany) Rolf Stommelen	Arrows-Ford	G				
DNQ	9	(Netherlands) Michael Bleekemolen	ATS-Ford	G				

== Final championship standings ==
Drivers' Championship standings

Pos	Driver	Points
1	(United States) **Mario Andretti**	64
2	(Sweden) Ronnie Peterson	51
3	(Argentina) Carlos Reutemann	48
4	(Austria) Niki Lauda	44
5	(France) Patrick Depailler	34

Constructors' Championship standings

	Pos	Constructor	Points
	1	(United Kingdom) **Lotus-Ford**	86
1	2	(Italy) Ferrari	58
1	3	(United Kingdom) Brabham-Alfa Romeo	53
	4	(United Kingdom) Tyrrell-Ford	38
1	5	(Canada) Wolf-Ford	24

- Note: Only the top five positions are included for both sets of standings.
- **Bold text** indicates 1978 World Champions.

Previous race: 1978 United States Grand Prix	FIA Formula One World Championship; 1978 season	Next race: 1979 Argentine Grand Prix
Previous race: 1977 Canadian Grand Prix	Canadian Grand Prix	Next race: 1979 Canadian Grand Prix
