= Rehal Kalandrian =

- Country: India
- Union territory: Jammu and Kashmir
- District: Jammu
- Block: Bishnah

Rehal Kalandrian is situated in Bishnah tehsil and located in Jammu district of Jammu and Kashmir. It is one of 116 villages in Bishnah Block along with villages like Rehal Dhamalian and Poondowal.
