= Rehali, Maharashtra =

- Interactive map of Rehali, Maharashtra
- Country: India
- State: Maharashtra
- District: Gondiya
- Block: Deori

Rehali is situated in Deori tehsil and located in Gondiya district of Maharashtra, India. It is one of 135 villages in Deori Block along with villages like Paulzola and Wandhara. Nearby railway station of Rehali is Deori.
