= Rehalkar =

Coordinates: 32°02′N 76°15′E

- Country: India
- State: Himachal Pradesh
- District: Kangra
- Block: Kangra

Rehalkar is a town situated in Kangra tehsil, in Kangra district of Himachal Pradesh, India. It is one of 175 villages in Kangra Block. The closest railway station is in Kangra.
