= Rehali, Madhya Pradesh =

- Country: India
- State: Madhya Pradesh
- District: Shajapur
- Block: Shajapur

Rehali is situated in Shajapur tehsil and located in Shajapur district of Madhya Pradesh, India. It is one of 152 villages in Shajapur Block along with villages like Jahanpur and Bhumree. Nearby railway station of Rehali is Shajapur.

As of the 2011 census, Rehali's population is 837 individuals comprising 205 families.

Additionally, Rehali has a literacy rate of 70%, slightly higher than the Madhya Pradesh state literacy rate of 69.32%.
