= Rehalpura =

- Country: India
- State: Himachal Pradesh
- District: Kangra

Rehalpura is a hamlet located in the Kangra district of Himachal Pradesh, India. It comes under Rihal Pura Gram panchayat. It is located 14 km towards South from Dharamshala and 164 km from State capital Shimla

Dharamshala, Hamirpur, Chamba and Dalhousie are the nearby cities to Rehalpura.
