= Halotali =

- Village
- Location in Punjab, India Halotali (India)
- Coordinates: 31.274844°N 75.6050176°E
- Country: India
- State: Punjab
- District: Jalandhar

Government
  - Type: Panchayat raj
  - Body: Gram panchayat
- Elevation: 240 m (790 ft)

Languages
  - Official: Punjabi
- Time zone: UTC+5:30 (IST)
- ISO 3166 code: IN-PB
- Vehicle registration: PB- 08
- Website: jalandhar.nic.in

Halotali is a village in Jalandhar district of Punjab State, India. It is located 9 kilometres (5.6 mi) from district headquarter Jalandhar and 146 kilometres (91 mi) from state capital Chandigarh. The village is administrated by a sarpanch who is an elected representative of village as per Panchayati raj (India).

== See also ==
- List of villages in India
