= 1977 Canadian Grand Prix =

16th round of the 1977 Formula One World Championship

- Race 16 of 17 in the 1977 Formula One season

Race details
- Date: 9 October 1977
- Location: Mosport Park, Canada
- Course: Permanent racing facility
- Course length: 3.957 km (2.459 miles)
- Distance: 80 laps, 316.56 km (196.72 miles)
- Weather: Cold with temperatures approaching 12 °C (54 °F); wind speeds up to 12.8 kilometres per hour (8.0 mph)

Pole position
Driver	(United States) Mario Andretti	Lotus-Ford
- Time: 1:11.385

Fastest lap
Driver	(United States) Mario Andretti	Lotus-Ford
- Time: 1:13.299 on lap 56

Podium
First	(South Africa) Jody Scheckter	Wolf-Ford
Second	(France) Patrick Depailler	Tyrrell-Ford
Third	(West Germany) Jochen Mass	McLaren-Ford

The 1977 Canadian Grand Prix was a Formula One motor race held on 9 October 1977, at Mosport Park. It was the 16th and penultimate race of the 1977 Formula One season.

== Background ==
The field arrived in Canada without Niki Lauda who, having clinched the Drivers' Championship at the previous race at Watkins Glen, and having already announced his intention to drive for Brabham in 1978, abruptly quit Ferrari upon learning that the team would bet on the 312T3 model, more conservative, but still technically more outdated in relation to cars with ground effect (which was becoming popular in the category thanks to the success of the Lotus 78). Canadian driver Gilles Villeneuve who had made a one-off appearance for McLaren earlier in the season at the British Grand Prix took Lauda's place in the Ferrari team. This was the 100th Grand Prix start for Surtees. In those 100 races, Surtees achieved two podium finishes and three fastest laps.

== Qualifying ==
=== Qualifying report ===
In qualifying, Lotus's Mario Andretti took his sixth pole position of the season, with McLaren's James Hunt alongside him on the front row. Ronnie Peterson was third in his six-wheeled Tyrrell, ahead of Gunnar Nilsson in the second Lotus. The top ten was completed by Jochen Mass in the second McLaren, Patrick Depailler in the second Tyrrell, the Shadows of Alan Jones and Riccardo Patrese, Jody Scheckter in the Wolf, and John Watson in the Brabham. But the safety of the bumpy, high-speed Mosport Park track was in question: during practice Ian Ashley's Hesketh crested one of these bumps on the Mario Andretti straight; it flipped, vaulted the barrier and crashed into a television tower, seriously injuring Ashley and ending his Formula One career. The Englishman survived, but it took 40 minutes to remove him from the car and an additional 30 minutes passed until a helicopter arrived. These problems were underlined later that day when Mass crashed at the first corner into a barrier that flattened upon impact.

=== Qualifying classification ===
Pos.	Driver	Constructor	Time	No
1	(United States) Mario Andretti	Lotus-Ford	1:11.385	1
2	(United Kingdom) James Hunt	McLaren-Ford	1:11.942	2
3	(Sweden) Ronnie Peterson	Tyrrell-Ford	1:12.752	3
4	(Sweden) Gunnar Nilsson	Lotus-Ford	1:12.975	4
5	(West Germany) Jochen Mass	McLaren-Ford	1:13.116	5
6	(France) Patrick Depailler	Tyrrell-Ford	1:13.207	6
7	(Australia) Alan Jones	Shadow-Ford	1:13.347	7
8	(Italy) Riccardo Patrese	Shadow-Ford	1:13.435	8
9	(South Africa) Jody Scheckter	Wolf-Ford	1:13.497	9
10	(United Kingdom) John Watson	Brabham-Alfa Romeo	1:13.500	10
11	(France) Jacques Laffite	Ligier-Matra	1:13.739	11
12	(Argentina) Carlos Reutemann	Ferrari	1:13.890	12
13	(West Germany) Hans-Joachim Stuck	Brabham-Alfa Romeo	1:13.953	13
14	(Switzerland) Clay Regazzoni	Ensign-Ford	1:13.999	14
15	(Italy) Vittorio Brambilla	Surtees-Ford	1:14.229	15
16	(France) Patrick Tambay	Ensign-Ford	1:14.464	16
17	(Canada) Gilles Villeneuve	Ferrari	1:14.465	17
18	(South Africa) Ian Scheckter	March-Ford	1:14.855	18
19	(Brazil) Emerson Fittipaldi	Fittipaldi-Ford	1:14.857	19
20	(United States) Brett Lunger	McLaren-Ford	1:14.930	20
21	(Belgium) Patrick Nève	March-Ford	1:15.510	21
22	(United States) Danny Ongais	Penske-Ford	1:15.599	22
23	(Brazil) Alex Ribeiro	March-Ford	1:15.770	23
24	(Austria) Hans Binder	Surtees-Ford	1:16.568	24
25	(United Kingdom) Ian Ashley	Hesketh-Ford	1:16.640	DNS
26	(United Kingdom) Rupert Keegan	Hesketh-Ford	1:17.000	25
DNQ	(France) Jean-Pierre Jabouille	Renault	1:18.999	—

== Race ==
=== Race report ===
At the start of the race, Andretti led away from Hunt, with Mass charging up to third. Andretti and Hunt then proceeded to pull away from the rest of the field, such that by three-quarter distance, they were coming up to lap third-placed Mass. As they did so, Hunt pulled ahead of Andretti, only to collide with his McLaren team-mate after a misunderstanding. Unable to continue, a visibly furious and agitated Hunt waved his fist at Mass, before punching a marshal and immediately then apologize who was trying to usher him away. He was subsequently fined $2000 for assaulting a marshal and $750 for walking back to the pit lane in an "unsafe manner". Gilles Villeneuve made his debut with Ferrari at this race and started seventeenth after a qualifying crash leading into Moss corner. He had risen to eighth place before spinning in Moss corner on lap 72, dropping back to tenth.

There was drama in the final four laps. On lap 77, Andretti's engine blew and laid oil in turn 9 as he pulled into the pits. Patrese spun his Shadow in the turn 9 oil and into the second Hesketh of Rupert Keegan, which had crashed earlier in the race and had been left on the side of the track. Vittorio Brambilla then hit the oil and also spun his Surtees, collecting the wreckages of Keegan's and Patrese's cars. Danny Ongais was next in the Interscope Penske, but was able to continue. Finally Villeneuve spun, staying on the track only to break a driveshaft trying to pull away and retiring.

Andretti's retirement meant that Scheckter inherited the win, with Depailler second and the recovered Mass completing the podium. Jones was fourth ahead of Patrick Tambay in the Ensign, while Brambilla was classified sixth, just ahead of Ongais.

This was the last Formula One race at Mosport Park. Although reasonably popular with drivers and fans, there was criticism that the track was cracked due to the cold Canadian forest weather later in the year (when the race was originally held) and that the drainage was poor, putting the safety of the drivers at risk, and so the Canadian Grand Prix was moved to the Circuit Gilles Villeneuve on Notre Dame Island in Montreal from 1978 onwards, where it has remained ever since.

=== Race classification ===
Pos	No	Driver	Constructor	Tyre	Laps	Time/Retired	Grid	Points
1	20	(South Africa) Jody Scheckter	Wolf-Ford	G	80	1:40:00.00	9	9
2	4	(France) Patrick Depailler	Tyrrell-Ford	G	80	+ 6.77	6	6
3	2	(West Germany) Jochen Mass	McLaren-Ford	G	80	+ 15.76	5	4
4	17	(Australia) Alan Jones	Shadow-Ford	G	80	+ 46.69	7	3
5	23	(France) Patrick Tambay	Ensign-Ford	G	80	+ 1:03.26	16	2
6	19	(Italy) Vittorio Brambilla	Surtees-Ford	G	78	Accident	15	1
7	14	(United States) Danny Ongais	Penske-Ford	G	78	+2 Laps	22	
8	9	(Brazil) Alex Ribeiro	March-Ford	G	78	+2 Laps	23	
9	5	(United States) Mario Andretti	Lotus-Ford	G	77	Engine	1	
10	16	(Italy) Riccardo Patrese	Shadow-Ford	G	76	Spun Off	8	
11	30	(United States) Brett Lunger	McLaren-Ford	G	76	Engine	20	
12	21	(Canada) Gilles Villeneuve	Ferrari	G	76	Transmission	17	
Ret	1	(United Kingdom) James Hunt	McLaren-Ford	G	61	Accident	2	
Ret	27	(Belgium) Patrick Nève	March-Ford	G	56	Engine	21	
Ret	3	(Sweden) Ronnie Peterson	Tyrrell-Ford	G	34	Fuel Leak	3	
Ret	24	(United Kingdom) Rupert Keegan	Hesketh-Ford	G	32	Accident	25	
Ret	18	(Austria) Hans Binder	Surtees-Ford	G	31	Accident	24	
Ret	10	(South Africa) Ian Scheckter	March-Ford	G	29	Engine	18	
Ret	28	(Brazil) Emerson Fittipaldi	Fittipaldi-Ford	G	29	Engine	19	
Ret	12	(Argentina) Carlos Reutemann	Ferrari	G	20	Fuel System	12	
Ret	8	(West Germany) Hans-Joachim Stuck	Brabham-Alfa Romeo	G	19	Engine	13	
Ret	6	(Sweden) Gunnar Nilsson	Lotus-Ford	G	17	Accident	4	
Ret	26	(France) Jacques Laffite	Ligier-Matra	G	12	Transmission	11	
Ret	7	(United Kingdom) John Watson	Brabham-Alfa Romeo	G	1	Suspension	10	
Ret	22	(Switzerland) Clay Regazzoni	Ensign-Ford	G	0	Accident	14	
DNS	25	(United Kingdom) Ian Ashley	Hesketh-Ford	G		Driver Injured		
DNQ	15	(France) Jean-Pierre Jabouille	Renault	MI				

== Championship standings after the race ==
Drivers' Championship standings

	Pos	Driver	Points
	1	(Austria) Niki Lauda*	72
1	2	(South Africa) Jody Scheckter	55
1	3	(United States) Mario Andretti	47
	4	(Argentina) Carlos Reutemann	36
	5	(United Kingdom) James Hunt	31

Constructors' Championship standings

	Pos	Constructor	Points
	1	(Italy) Ferrari*	89 (91)
	2	(United Kingdom) Lotus-Ford	62
1	3	(Canada) Wolf-Ford	55
1	4	(United Kingdom) McLaren-Ford	51
	5	(United Kingdom) Brabham-Alfa Romeo	27

- Note: Only the top five positions are included for both sets of standings. Only the best 8 results from the first 9 races and the best 7 results from the remaining 8 races were retained. Numbers without parentheses are retained points; numbers in parentheses are total points scored.
- Bold text and an asterisk indicates the 1977 World Champions.

Previous race: 1977 United States Grand Prix	FIA Formula One World Championship; 1977 season	Next race: 1977 Japanese Grand Prix
Previous race: 1976 Canadian Grand Prix	Canadian Grand Prix	Next race: 1978 Canadian Grand Prix
