= Rehaliya =

Rehaliya (रेहलिया)
- Village
- Country: India
- State: Rajasthan
- District: Barmer
- Tehsil: Sheo

Area
  - Total: 1,173.61 ha (2,900.1 acres)

Population (2011)
  - Total: 443
- Time zone: UTC+5:30 (IST)
- PIN: 344501
- ISO 3166 code: RJ-IN
- Vehicle registration: RJ-04

Rehaliya is situated in Sheo tehsil and located in Barmer district of Rajasthan, India. It is one of 299 villages in Sheo Block along with villages like Pannela and Makhan Ka Par. Nearby railway station of Rehaliya is Barmer. Rehaliya has a total population of 443 peoples according to Census 2011.
