= Gilles Villeneuve =

Canadian racing driver (1950–1982)

- Villeneuve in 1979
- Born: Joseph Gilles Henri Villeneuve; 18 January 1950; Saint-Jean-sur-Richelieu, Quebec, Canada
- Died: 8 May 1982 (aged 32); Leuven, Flanders, Belgium
- Cause of death: Injuries sustained at the 1982 Belgian Grand Prix
- Spouse: Joann Barthe (m. 1970)
- Children: 2, including Jacques
- Relatives: Jacques-Joseph Villeneuve (brother)

Formula One World Championship career
- Nationality: (Canada) Canadian
- Active years: 1977–1982
- Team(s): McLaren, Ferrari
- Entries: 68 (67 starts)
- Championships: 0
- Wins: 6
- Podiums: 13
- Career points: 101 (107) (Note: Up until 1990, not all points scored by a driver contributed to their final World Championship tally (see list of points scoring systems for more information). Numbers without parentheses are Championship points; numbers in parentheses are total points scored.)
- Pole positions: 2
- Fastest laps: 8
- First entry: 1977 British Grand Prix
- First win: 1978 Canadian Grand Prix
- Last win: 1981 Spanish Grand Prix
- Last entry: 1982 Belgian Grand Prix

Signature
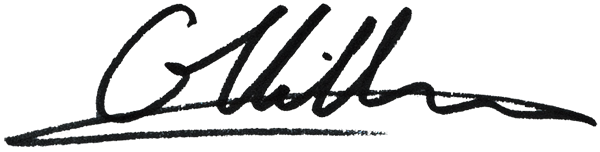

Joseph Gilles Henri Villeneuve (French pronunciation: [ʒil vil.nœv]; 18 January 1950 – 8 May 1982) was a Canadian racing driver, who competed in Formula One from 1977 to 1982. Villeneuve was runner-up in the Formula One World Drivers' Championship in 1979 with Ferrari, and won six Grands Prix across six seasons.

A racing enthusiast from an early age, Villeneuve started his career in snowmobile racing across his native province of Quebec. He soon progressed to open-wheel racing, winning the regional Formula Ford championship in 1973 before graduating to Formula Atlantic, where he won two Canadian Championships in 1976 and 1977, and the American Championship in 1976. Villeneuve made his Formula One debut with McLaren at the 1977 British Grand Prix, impressing Enzo Ferrari, who signed him with Ferrari for 1978. He made an early debut for the team at the Canadian Grand Prix after the departure of World Champion Niki Lauda, and was involved in a collision with Ronnie Peterson which killed two bystanders at the season-ending Japanese Grand Prix. Amidst struggles with Michelin's radial tyres the following year, Villeneuve took his maiden podium in Austria before winning his home Grand Prix in Canada. He won three races in 1979, ultimately finishing the championship runner-up to teammate Jody Scheckter by four points. Villeneuve earned widespread acclaim for his performances, including his duel with René Arnoux at the French Grand Prix. After a winless season for Ferrari with the 312T5 in 1980, Villeneuve took back-to-back wins at the Monaco and Spanish Grands Prix in 1981, earning further acclaim for his defensive tactics at the latter.

During qualifying for the 1982 Belgian Grand Prix at Zolder, Villeneuve died as the result of a collision with Jochen Mass. He achieved six wins, two pole positions, eight fastest laps, and 13 podiums in Formula One. At the time of his death, Villeneuve was widely popular in the motorsport community and has since become an iconic figure in the history of the sport. The Circuit Île Notre-Dame in Montreal—home of the Canadian Grand Prix since his 1978 victory—was renamed the Circuit Gilles Villeneuve upon his death. His son, Jacques, became the first World Drivers' Champion from Canada in 1997. Alongside Jacques, Villeneuve is an inductee of the Canadian Motorsport Hall of Fame and Canada's Sports Hall of Fame.

== Personal and early life ==
Villeneuve was born 18 January 1950, to piano-tuner Seville Villeneuve (1926–1987) and his wife Georgette (née Coupal; 1925–2008) at Saint-Jean-sur-Richelieu in the province of Quebec, Canada and grew up in Berthierville. In 1970 he married Joann Barthe, with whom he had two children, Jacques and Mélanie. During his early career Villeneuve took his family on the road with him in a motorhome during the racing season, a habit which he continued to some extent during his Formula One career. At the time of his death Gilles was reportedly considering divorce from Joann: he had long been having an extramarital affair with a Torontonian woman.

Villeneuve often claimed to have been born in 1952. By the time he made his debut in Formula One, he was already 27 years old and subtracted two years from his age to avoid being considered too old to find success at the highest level of motorsport. His younger brother Jacques also had a successful racing career in Formula Atlantic, Can–Am and CART. Gilles' son, also named Jacques, won the Indianapolis 500 and CART championships in 1995 and became Formula One World Champion in 1997.

== Early career ==
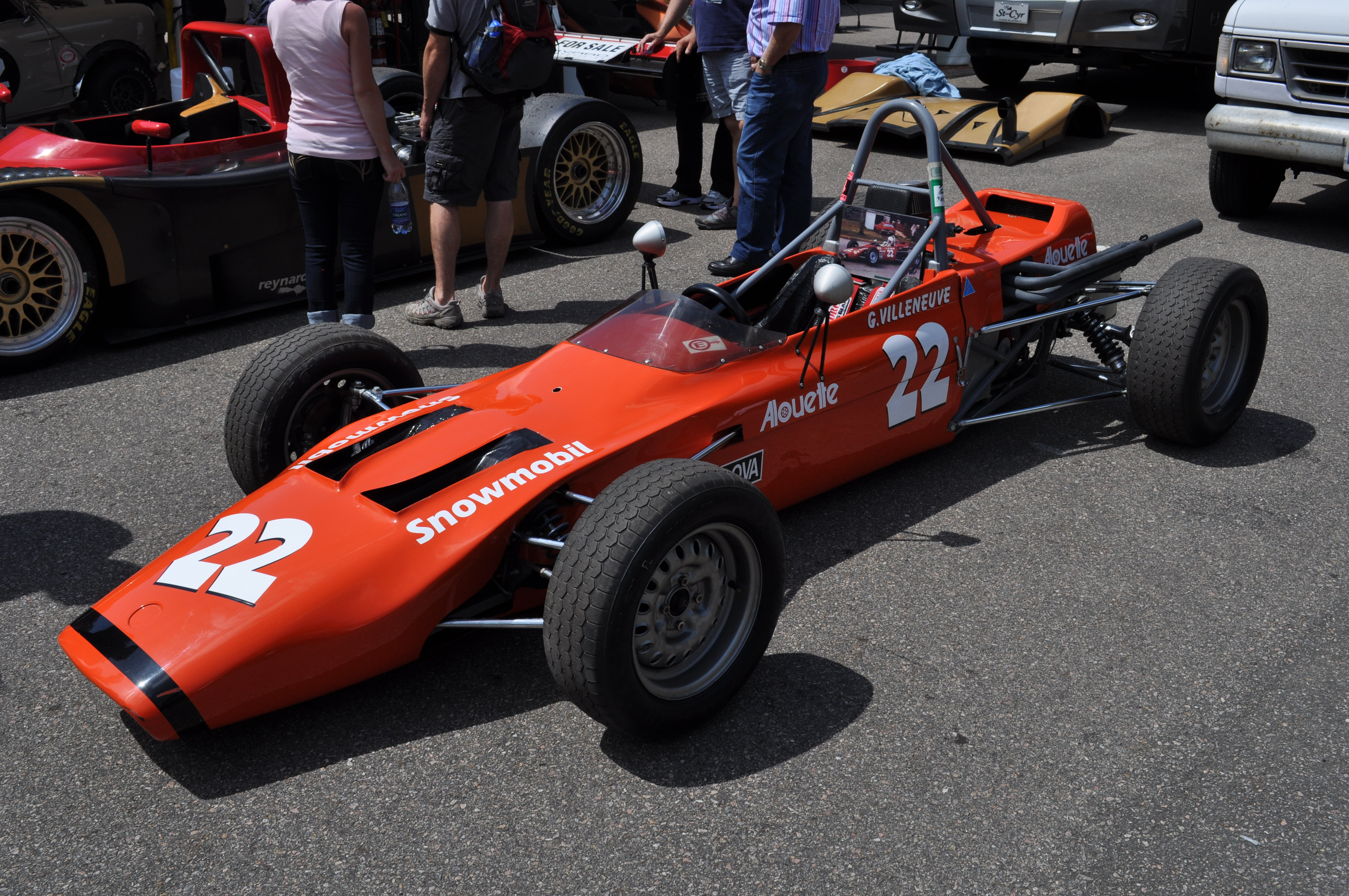
Villeneuve's 1973 Magnum MkIII Formula Ford car, with which he won the Quebec Formula Ford championship

Villeneuve started competitive driving in local drag-racing events, entering his road car, a modified 1967 Ford Mustang. He soon became bored by this and entered the Jim Russell Racing School at Circuit Mont-Tremblant to gain a racing licence. He then had a very successful season in Quebec regional Formula Ford, running his own two-year-old car and winning seven of the ten races he entered. The next year he progressed to Formula Atlantic, where he would compete for four seasons, running his own car again for one of those seasons. He won his first Atlantic race in 1975 at Gimli Motorsport Park in heavy rain. In 1976, teamed with Chris Harrison's Ecurie Canada and factory March race engineer Ray Wardell, he dominated the season by winning all but one of the races and taking the US and Canadian titles. He won the Canadian championship again in 1977.

Money was an issue in Villeneuve's early career. He was a professional racing driver from his late teens, with no other income. In the first few years the bulk of his income in fact came from snowmobile racing, where he was extremely successful. He could demand appearance money as well as race money, especially after winning the 1974 World Championship Snowmobile Derby. His second season in Formula Atlantic was part-sponsored by his snowmobile manufacturer, Skiroule. He credited some of his success to his snowmobiling days:

Every winter, you would reckon on three or four big spills — and I'm talking about being thrown on to the ice at 100 miles per hour. Those things used to slide a lot, which taught me a great deal about control. And the visibility was terrible! Unless you were leading, you could see nothing, with all the snow blowing about. Good for the reactions — and it stopped me having any worries about racing in the rain.

== Formula One career ==
After Villeneuve impressed James Hunt by beating him and several other Grand Prix stars in a non-championship Formula Atlantic race at Trois-Rivières in 1976, Hunt's McLaren team offered Villeneuve a Formula One deal for up to five races in a third car during the 1977 season. Villeneuve made his debut at the 1977 British Grand Prix, where he qualified 9th in McLaren's old M23, separating the regular drivers Hunt and Jochen Mass who were driving newer M26s. In the race he set the fifth-fastest lap and finished 11th after being delayed for two laps by a faulty temperature gauge. The British press coverage of Villeneuve's performance was generally complimentary, including John Blunsden's comment in The Times that "Anyone seeking a future World Champion need look no further than this quietly assured young man."

Despite this, shortly after the British race McLaren's experienced team manager Teddy Mayer decided not to continue with Villeneuve for the following year. His explanation was that Villeneuve "was looking as though he might be a bit expensive" and that Patrick Tambay, the team's eventual choice for 1978, was showing similar promise. Villeneuve was left with no solid options for 1978, although Canadian Walter Wolf, for whom Villeneuve had driven in Can-Am racing, considered giving him a drive at Wolf Racing. Rumours circulated that Villeneuve was one of several drivers in whom Ferrari's team was interested, and in August 1977 he flew to Italy to meet Enzo Ferrari, who was immediately reminded of Tazio Nuvolari, the pre-war European champion. "When they presented me with this 'piccolo Canadese' (little Canadian), this minuscule bundle of nerves, I immediately recognised in him the physique of Nuvolari and said to myself, let's give him a try." Ferrari was satisfied with Villeneuve's promise after a session at Ferrari's Fiorano test track, despite the Canadian making many mistakes and setting relatively slow times, and Villeneuve signed to drive for Ferrari in the last two races of 1977, as well as the full 1978 season. Villeneuve later remarked that: "If someone said to me that you can have three wishes, my first would have been to get into racing, my second to be in Formula 1, my third to drive for Ferrari..."

Villeneuve's arrival was prompted by Ferrari driver Niki Lauda quitting the team at the penultimate race of the 1977 season, the Canadian Grand Prix at Mosport Park near Toronto, having already clinched his second championship with the Italian team. Villeneuve retired from his home race after sliding off the track on another competitor's oil. He also raced in the last race of that season, the Japanese Grand Prix at the Mount Fuji Speedway near Tokyo but retired on lap five when he tried to outbrake the Tyrrell P34 of Ronnie Peterson. The pair banged wheels causing Villeneuve's Ferrari to become airborne. It landed on a group of spectators watching the race from a prohibited area, killing one spectator and a race marshal and injuring seven people. After an investigation into the incident no blame was apportioned and, although he was "terribly sad" at the deaths, Villeneuve did not feel responsible for them.

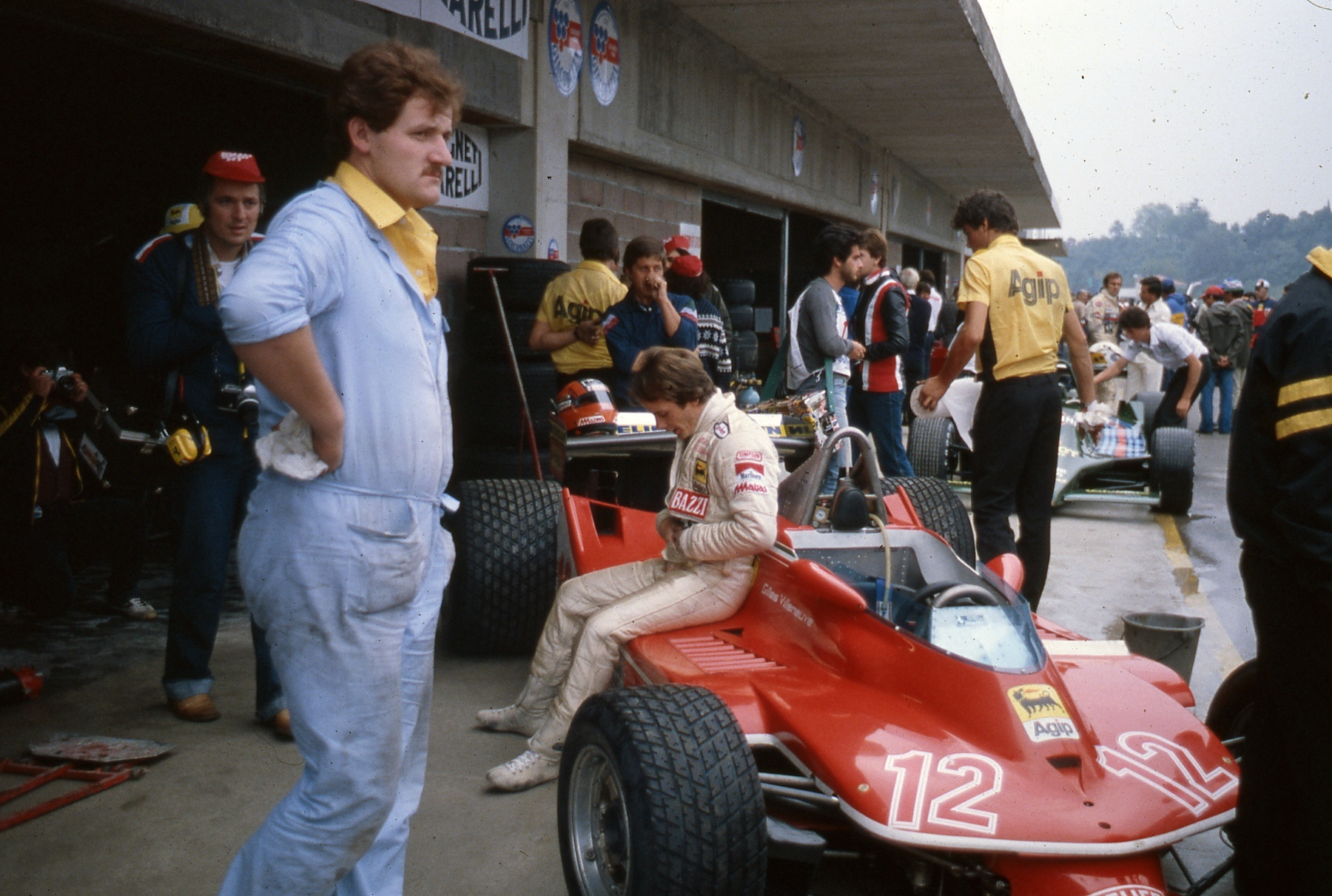
Villeneuve sitting on his car at Imola in 1979

The 1978 season saw a succession of retirements for Villeneuve, often after problems with the new Michelin radial tyres. Early in the season, he started on the front row at the United States Grand Prix West in Long Beach, but crashed out of the lead on lap 39. Despite calls in the Italian press for him to be replaced, Ferrari persisted with him. Towards the end of the season, Villeneuve's results improved. He finished second on the road at the Italian Grand Prix, although he was penalised a minute for jumping the start, and ran second at the United States Grand Prix before his engine failed. Finally at the season-ending Canadian Grand Prix, this time at the Circuit Notre Dame Island in Montreal (a circuit that was eventually named after him) Villeneuve scored his first Grand Prix win after Jean-Pierre Jarier's Lotus stopped with engine trouble. To date, he remains the only Canadian to win the Canadian Grand Prix.

In the 1979 French Grand Prix Villeneuve and René Arnoux had a memorable duel for second place.

Villeneuve was joined by Jody Scheckter in 1979 after Carlos Reutemann moved to Lotus. Villeneuve won three races during the year and even briefly led the championship after winning back to back races in Long Beach and Kyalami. However, the season is mostly remembered for Villeneuve's wheel-banging duel with René Arnoux in the last laps of the 1979 French Grand Prix. Arnoux passed Villeneuve for second place with three laps to go, but Villeneuve re-passed him on the next lap. On the final lap Arnoux attempted to pass Villeneuve again, and the pair ran side by side through the first few corners of the lap, making contact several times. Arnoux took the position but Villeneuve attempted an outside pass one corner later. The cars bumped hard, Villeneuve slid wide but then passed Arnoux on the inside at a hairpin turn and held him off for the last half of the lap to secure second place. Villeneuve commented afterwards, "I tell you, that was really fun! I thought for sure we were going to get on our heads, you know, because when you start interlocking wheels it's very easy for one car to climb over another." At the Dutch Grand Prix a slow puncture collapsed Villeneuve's left rear tyre and put him off the track. He returned to the circuit and limped back to the pit lane on three wheels, losing the damaged wheel on the way. On his return to the pit lane Villeneuve insisted that the team replace the missing wheel, and had to be persuaded that the car was beyond repair. Villeneuve might have won the World Championship by ignoring team orders to beat Scheckter at the Italian Grand Prix, but chose to finish behind him, ending his own championship challenge. The pair finished first and second in the championship, with Scheckter beating Villeneuve by just four points. During the extremely wet Friday practice session for the season-ending United States Grand Prix, Villeneuve set a time variously reported to be either nine or 11 seconds faster than any other driver. His teammate Jody Scheckter, who was second fastest, recalled that "I scared myself rigid that day. I thought I had to be quickest. Then I saw Gilles's time and — I still don't really understand how it was possible. Eleven seconds!"

The 1980 season was sub-par for Ferrari. Villeneuve had been considered favourite for the Drivers' Championship by bookmakers in the United Kingdom, though he only scored six points in the whole campaign in the 312T5 which had only partial ground effects. Scheckter scored only two points and retired at the end of the season.

For the 1981 season, Ferrari introduced their first turbocharged engined F1 car, the 126C, which produced tremendous power but was let down by its poor handling. Villeneuve was partnered with Didier Pironi who noted that Villeneuve "had a little family [at Ferrari] but he made me welcome and made me feel at home overnight ... [He] treated me as an equal in every way." Villeneuve won two races during the season. At the Spanish Grand Prix Villeneuve kept five quicker cars behind him for most of the race using the superior straight-line speed of his car. After an hour and 46 minutes of racing, Villeneuve led second-placed Jacques Laffite by only 0.22 seconds. Fifth-placed Elio de Angelis was only just over a second further back. Harvey Postlethwaite, who was hired by Ferrari to design the follow-on and much more successful 126C2 that won the Constructors' Championship in 1982, later commented on the 126C: "That car...had literally one quarter of the downforce that, say Williams or Brabham had. It had a power advantage over the Cosworths for sure, but it also had massive throttle lag at that time. In terms of sheer ability I think Gilles was on a different plane to the other drivers. To win those races, the 1981 GPs at Monaco and Jarama — on tight circuits — was quite out of this world. I know how bad that car was." At the 1981 Canadian Grand Prix Villeneuve damaged the front wing of his Ferrari and drove for most of the race in heavy rain with the wing obscuring his view ahead. There was a risk of being disqualified but eventually the wing detached and Villeneuve drove on to finish third with the nose section of his car missing.

Villeneuve was offered a deal by team owner Ron Dennis to rejoin McLaren in 1982, which he rejected because he was nervous over ending his contract with Ferrari but optimistic that the Italian team would be competitive. The first few races of the 1982 season saw Villeneuve leading in Brazil in the new 126C2, before spinning into retirement, and finishing third at the United States Grand Prix West before being disqualified for a technical infringement. The Ferraris were handed an unexpected advantage at the San Marino Grand Prix as an escalation of the FISA–FOCA war saw the FOCA teams boycott the race, effectively leaving Renault as Ferrari's only serious opposition. With Renault driver Prost retiring from fourth place on lap 7 followed by his teammate Arnoux on the 44th lap, Ferrari seemed to have the win guaranteed. In order to conserve fuel and ensure the cars finished, the Ferrari team ordered both drivers to slow down. Villeneuve believed that the order also meant that the drivers were to maintain position but Pironi passed Villeneuve. A few laps later, Villeneuve re-passed Pironi and slowed down again, believing that Pironi was simply trying to entertain the Italian crowd. On the last lap, Pironi passed and aggressively chopped across the front of Gilles in Villeneuve corner and took the win. Villeneuve was irate as he believed that Pironi had disobeyed the order to hold position. Meanwhile, Pironi claimed that he had done nothing wrong as the team had only ordered the cars to slow down, not maintain position. Villeneuve stated after the race "I think it is well known that if I want someone to stay behind me and I am faster, then he stays behind me." Feeling betrayed and angry Villeneuve vowed never to speak to Pironi again.

In 2007, John Hogan, the retired Vice President of Marketing at Ferrari sponsor Phillip Morris and later Jaguar Racing team principal who was at the sponsor during Villeneuve's career, disputed the claim that Pironi had gone back on a prior arrangement with Villeneuve. He said: "Neither of them would ever have agreed to what effectively was throwing a race. I think Gilles was stunned somebody had out-driven him and that it just caught him so much by surprise." A comparison of the lap times of the two drivers showed that Villeneuve lapped far slower when he was in the lead, suggesting that he had indeed been trying to save fuel.

== Death ==
On 8 May 1982, Villeneuve died after an accident during the final qualifying session for the Belgian Grand Prix at Zolder. At the time of the crash, Pironi had set a time one-tenth of a second faster than Villeneuve for sixth place. Villeneuve was using his final set of qualifying tyres; some say he was attempting to improve his time on his final lap, while others suggest he was specifically aiming to beat Pironi. However, Villeneuve's biographer Gerald Donaldson quotes Ferrari race engineer Mauro Forghieri as saying that the Canadian, although pressing on in his usual fashion, was returning to the pit lane when the accident occurred. If so, he would not have set a time on that lap.

With eight minutes of the session left, Villeneuve came over the rise after the first chicane and caught Jochen Mass travelling much more slowly through Butte, the left-handed bend before the Terlamenbocht double right-hand section. Mass saw Villeneuve approaching at high speed and moved to the right to let him through on the racing line. At the same instant Villeneuve also moved right to pass the slower car. The Ferrari hit the back of Mass' car and was launched into the air at a speed estimated to be 200–225 km/h (124–140 mph). It was airborne for more than 100 m (330 ft) before nosediving into the ground and breaking apart as it somersaulted along the edge of the track. Villeneuve, still strapped to his seat, but now without his helmet, was thrown a further 50 m (160 ft) from the wreckage into the catch fencing on the outside edge of the Terlamenbocht corner.

Several drivers stopped and rushed to the scene. John Watson and Derek Warwick pulled Villeneuve, his face blue, from the catch fence. The first doctor arrived within 35 seconds to find that Villeneuve was not breathing, although with a pulse; he was intubated and ventilated before being transferred to the circuit medical centre and subsequently by helicopter to University St Raphael Hospital in Leuven where a fatal fracture of the neck was diagnosed. Villeneuve was kept alive on life support while his wife travelled to the hospital and the doctors consulted specialists worldwide. He died at 21:12 CEST (UTC+2). An inquiry into the accident was led by Derek Ongaro, the safety inspector for Fédération Internationale du Sport Automobile (FISA), which concluded that an error from Villeneuve caused him to strike Mass' car and exonerated the latter of any responsibility for the accident.

== Helmet ==
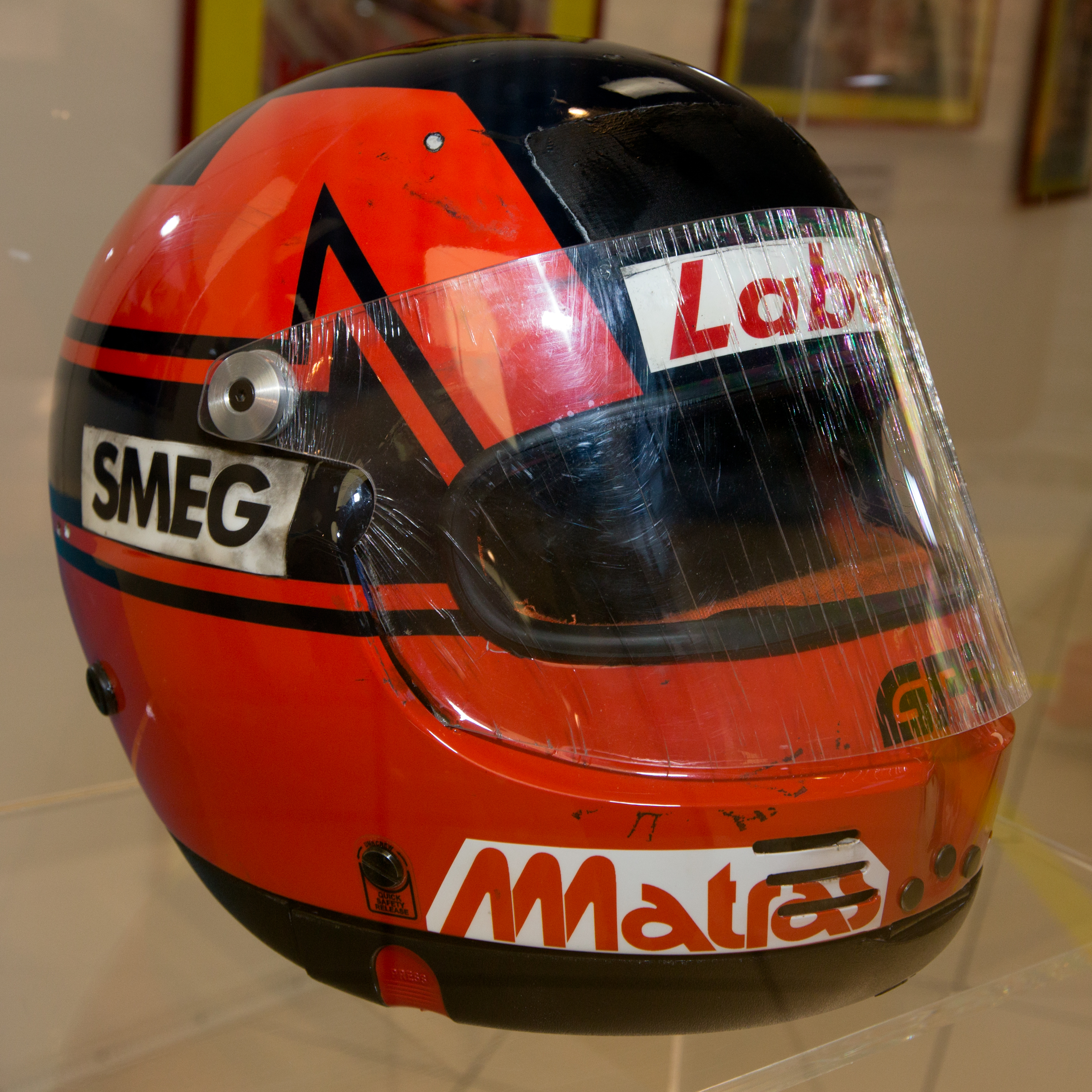
Gilles Villeneuve helmet (Museo Ferrari)

Villeneuve's helmet had a base colour of black, with a stylised 'V' in red on either side—an effect he devised with his wife Joann. Gilles' son, Jacques, started racing equipped with his father's old helmet and boots. British driver Perry McCarthy also used this design and colour scheme on his helmet, but with the design in reverse.

Ferrari driver Charles Leclerc wore a one-off tribute helmet to Villeneuve at the 2023 Canadian Grand Prix, using a similar design.

== Legacy ==
In total, Villeneuve competed in 67 Grands Prix, winning six of them and achieving thirteen podium finishes. At his funeral in Berthierville, former teammate Jody Scheckter delivered the eulogy: "For me, firstly, Gilles was the most genuine person I ever knew. Secondly, he was the fastest racing driver that history has ever known. He went doing something that he loved, but he hasn't left us, because the world will remember what he has given to motor racing." In Villeneuve's entry in The Canadian Encyclopedia, Bob Ferguson and Michael Gee wrote that retrospective comments were complimentary of his driving, and said he was approachable and spoke informally to the media and fans. Niki Lauda said of him: "He was the craziest devil I ever came across in Formula 1... The fact that, for all this, he was a sensitive and lovable character rather than an out-and-out hell-raiser made him such a unique human being".

Villeneuve is still remembered at Grand Prix races, especially those in Italy. At the Autodromo Enzo e Dino Ferrari, the venue of the San Marino Grand Prix and Emilia Romagna Grand Prix, a corner was named after him and a Canadian flag is painted on the third slot on the starting grid, from which he started his last race. A bronze bust of Villeneuve stands at the entrance to the Ferrari test track at Fiorano. At Zolder the corner where Villeneuve died has been turned into a chicane and named after him.

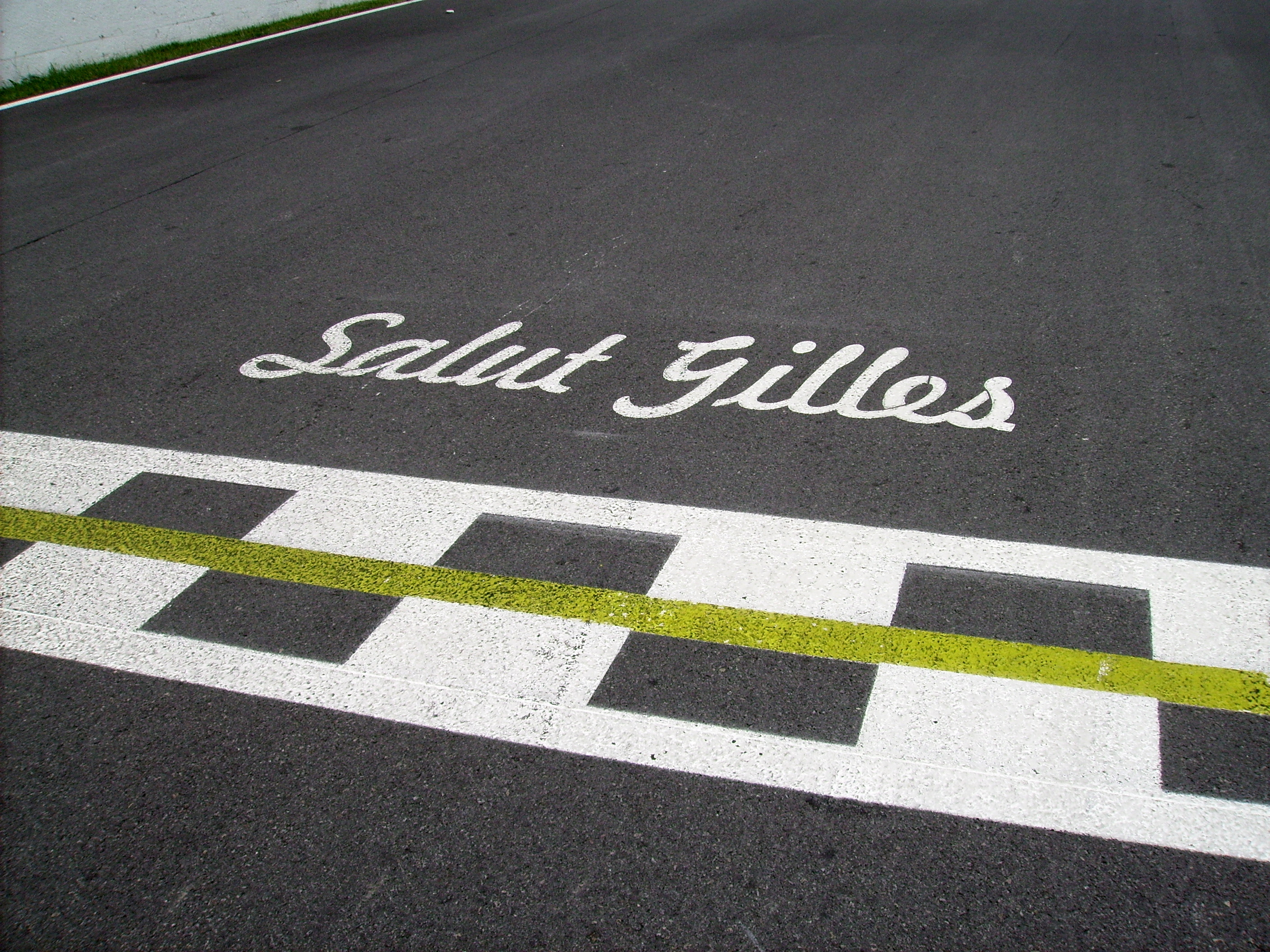
"Salut Gilles" sign at the Circuit Gilles Villeneuve start-finish line

The racetrack on Notre Dame Island in Montreal, host to the Formula One Canadian Grand Prix, was named Circuit Gilles Villeneuve in his honour at the 1982 Canadian Grand Prix and a sign reading “Salut Gilles” was painted at the start/finish line. His home country has continued to honour him: in Berthierville a museum was opened in 1992, and a lifelike statue stood in front until it was stolen in 2024. Berthierville also has a park named in his honour. Villeneuve was inducted into the Canadian Motorsport Hall of Fame at their inaugural induction ceremony at the Four Seasons Hotel, Toronto, Ontario on 19 August 1993. He was also inducted into Canada's Sports Hall of Fame in 1983. In June 1997 Canada issued a postage stamp in his honour.

There is still a huge demand for Villeneuve memorabilia at the race-track shops and several books have been written about him. The number 27, the number of his Ferrari in 1981 and 1982, is still closely associated with him by fans. Villeneuve's son, Jacques, drove the No. 27 during his IndyCar and Indianapolis 500 winning season with Team Green, and has also used the number for occasional drives in NASCAR and the Speedcar Series. Canadian driver Andrew Ranger used number 27 in the 2005 and 2006 Champ Car seasons, and continued using the number at NASCAR Canadian Tire Series since 2007. Canadian driver and 2011 IndyCar Rookie of the Year James Hinchcliffe adopted the number 27 for the 2012 season when he joined Andretti Autosport (former Andretti Green Racing).

== In popular culture ==
A film based on the biography by Gerald Donaldson was announced in 2005, to be produced by Capri Films Inc, and with Christian Duguay named as the director; the film has yet to materialise. A new film, to be directed by Daniel Roby, was announced as entering production in 2023.

The popular French comics series Michel Vaillant by Jean Graton is set in the world of motor racing and, although largely fictional, often includes real-life figures including drivers, officials and journalists. Villeneuve appears in a number of stories, and in Steve Warson contre Michel Vaillant (fr: "Steve Warson versus Michel Vaillant") becomes the 1980 World Champion (though in the 1981 season, covered in Rififi en F1 ["Trouble in F1"], Graton acknowledges Alan Jones as the real Champion) and Quebec progressive rock and pop band The Box based their 1984 song "Live on TV" inspired by Villeneuve's televised death. In 1996, Japanese rock band PLAGUES released "Song for Gilles Villeneuve" as a single for their Sentimental Kick Boxer album. In 2017, Italian rock band, The Rock Alchemist wrote the song, "27" for their Elements album as a tribute to Gilles Villeneuve's #27 Ferrari F1 car.

Villeneuve: The Rise of a Legend (Villeneuve : l'ascension d'une légende), a drama film about Villeneuve by Yan Lanouette Turgeon and starring Rémi Goulet as Villeneuve, released in 2026.

== Racing record ==
=== Career summary ===
Season	Series	Team	Races	Wins	Poles	F/Laps	Podiums	Points	Position
1975	CASC Formula Atlantic	Skiroule Snowmobile	8	1	?	?	2	69	5th
1976	CASC Formula Atlantic	Ecurie Canada	6	5	?	?	5	120	**1st**
1976	IMSA Formula Atlantic	Ecurie Canada	4	4	?	?	4	80	**1st**
1976	European Formula Two	Project Four Racing	1	0	0	0	0	0	NC
1977	CASC Formula Atlantic	Ecurie Canada	7	4	?	?	5	114	**1st**
1977	Formula One	Marlboro Team McLaren	1	0	0	0	0	0	NC
1977	Formula One	SEFAC Ferrari	2	0	0	0	0	0	NC
1977	World Championship for Makes	BMW Alpina	1	0	0	0	1	0	NC
1978	Formula One	SEFAC Ferrari	16	1	0	1	2	17	9th
1979	Formula One	SEFAC Ferrari	15	3	1	6	7	53	**2nd**
1980	Formula One	SEFAC Ferrari	14	0	0	0	0	6	12th
1981	Formula One	Ferrari	15	2	1	1	3	25	7th
1982	Formula One	Ferrari	5	0	0	0	1	6	15th

=== Complete Formula One World Championship results ===
(key) (Races in bold indicate pole position; races in italics indicate fastest lap)

Year	Entrant	Chassis	Engine	1	2	3	4	5	6	7	8	9	10	11	12	13	14	15	16	17	WDC	Pts.
1977	Marlboro Team McLaren	McLaren M23E	Ford Cosworth DFV 3.0 V8	ARG	BRA	RSA	USW	ESP	MON	BEL	SWE	FRA	GBR; 11	GER	AUT	NED	ITA	USA			NC	0
1977	SEFAC Ferrari	Ferrari 312T2	Ferrari 015 3.0 F12																CAN; 12	JPN; Ret	NC	0
1978	SEFAC Ferrari	Ferrari 312T2	Ferrari 015 3.0 F12	ARG; 8	BRA; Ret																9th	17
1978	SEFAC Ferrari	Ferrari 312T3	Ferrari 015 3.0 F12			RSA; Ret	USW; Ret	MON; Ret	BEL; 4	ESP; 10	SWE; 9	FRA; 12	GBR; Ret	GER; 8	AUT; 3	NED; 6	ITA; 7	USA; Ret	CAN; 1		9th	17
1979	SEFAC Ferrari	Ferrari 312T3	Ferrari 015 3.0 F12	ARG; Ret	BRA; 5																**2nd**	**47 (53)**
1979	SEFAC Ferrari	Ferrari 312T4	Ferrari 015 3.0 F12			RSA; 1	**USW**; 1	ESP; 7	BEL; 7	MON; Ret	FRA; 2	GBR; 14†	GER; 8	AUT; 2	NED; Ret	ITA; 2	CAN; 2	USA; 1			**2nd**	**47 (53)**
1980	SEFAC Ferrari	Ferrari 312T5	Ferrari 015 3.0 F12	ARG; Ret	BRA; 16†	RSA; Ret	USW; Ret	BEL; 6	MON; 5	FRA; 8	GBR; Ret	GER; 6	AUT; 8	NED; 7	ITA; Ret	CAN; 5	USA; Ret				12th	6
1981	Ferrari	Ferrari 126CK	Ferrari 021/1 1.5 V6 t	USW; Ret	BRA; Ret	ARG; Ret	**SMR**; 7	BEL; 4	MON; 1	ESP; 1	FRA; Ret	GBR; Ret	GER; 10	AUT; Ret	NED; Ret	ITA; Ret	CAN; 3	CPL; DSQ			7th	25
1982	Ferrari	Ferrari 126C2	Ferrari 021/2 1.5 V6 t	RSA; Ret	BRA; Ret	USW; DSQ	SMR; 2	BEL; DNS	MON	DET	CAN	NED	GBR	FRA	GER	AUT	SUI	ITA	CPL		15th	6

† - Villeneuve retired from the race but was classified as he had completed more than 90% of the race distance.

=== Non-championship Formula One results ===
(key) (Races in bold indicate pole position; races in italics indicate fastest lap.)

Year	Entrant	Chassis	Engine	1	2	3
1979	SEFAC Ferrari	Ferrari 312 T3	Ferrari 015 3.0 F12	ROC; 1	GNM	
1979	SEFAC Ferrari	Ferrari 312 T4	Ferrari 015 3.0 F12			**DIN**; 7
1980	SEFAC Ferrari	Ferrari 312 T5	Ferrari 015 3.0 F12	ESP; WD	AUS	

== See also ==
- Formula One drivers from Canada

Sporting positions
New title	American Formula Atlantic Champion; 1976	N/A; American and Canadian merged into North American title
Preceded by Bill Brack	Canadian Formula Atlantic Champion; 1976–1977	Succeeded by Howdy Holmes as North American champion
Preceded by James Hunt	Brands Hatch Race of Champions winner 1979	Succeeded by Keke Rosberg
Preceded by Patrick Depailler	Formula One fatal accidents 8 May 1982	Succeeded by Riccardo Paletti
