= March 811 =

Formula One car

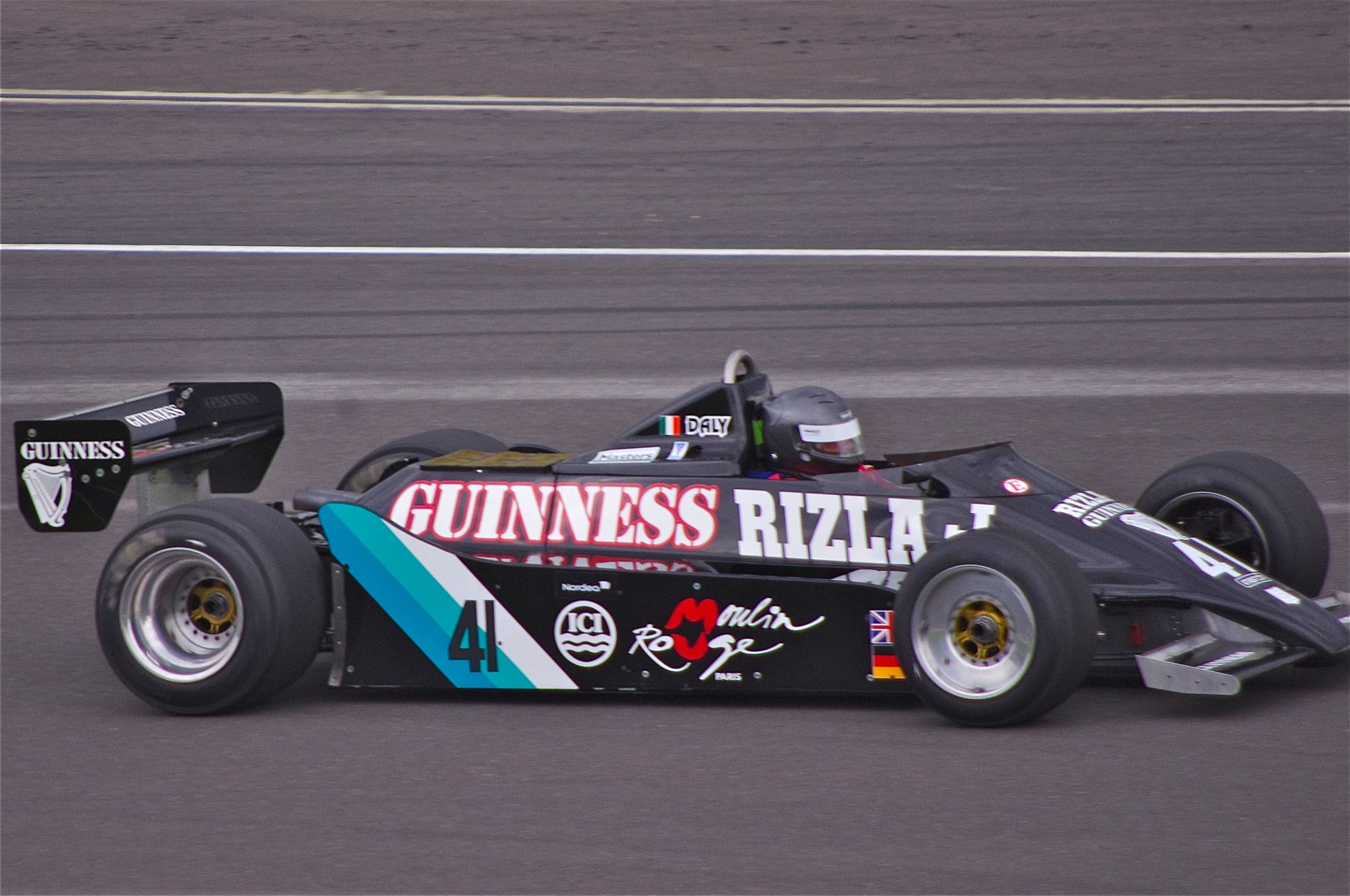
- Category: Formula One
- Constructor: March Engineering
- Designers: Paul Brown; Robin Herd; Gordon Coppuck; Adrian Reynard
- Predecessor: March 781
- Successor: March 821

Technical specifications
- Chassis: Aluminium monocoque
- Suspension (front): Double wishbones, rocker-actuated coil springs and dampers, anti-roll bar
- Suspension (rear): Double wishbones, rocker actuated coil springs and dampers, anti-roll bar
- Wheelbase: 2,692 mm (106.0 in)
- Engine: Ford-Cosworth DFV 2,993 cc (182.6 cu in) 90° V8 naturally aspirated mid-mounted
- Transmission: Hewland FGA 400 6-speed manual.
- Power: 485 hp (362 kW)
- Weight: 582–632 kg (1,283–1,393 lb)
- Tyres: Michelin; Avon

Competition history
- Notable entrants: March Engineering
- Notable drivers: (Republic of Ireland) Derek Daly (Chile) Eliseo Salazar
- Debut: 1981 United States Grand Prix West
| Races | Wins | Poles | F/Laps |
|---|---|---|---|
| 15 | 0 | 0 | 0 |

The March 811 is a Formula One car built by March Engineering and used by RAM Racing in the 1981 Formula One World Championship. Designed by Paul Brown, Robin Herd, Gordon Coppuck, and Adrian Reynard, it was powered by the traditional 3.0 L (180 cu in) Ford-Cosworth DFV V8 engine. It initially used Michelin tyres, but eventually switched to Avon tyres at the 1981 French Grand Prix. It was March's first Formula One car since 1977.

== Background ==
The March 811 was designed on behalf of RAM Racing.

RAM Racing was a British racing team that had been involved in various motorsport classes since 1975. In the second half of the 1970s, the team's focus was on the Aurora AFX Formula One Series, an all-British championship run under Formula One regulations. RAM won the championship title of this series in the 1980 season. In the Formula 1 World Championship, on the other hand, RAM initially only competed sporadically. In 1976, 1977, and 1980 it used race cars from other manufacturers such as Brabham, March and Williams, which were purchased or rented, as a pure customer team at selected Grand Prix events. After RAM and driver Emilio de Villota won the Aurora Series in 1980, team manager John Macdonald decided to take part in the Formula 1 World Championship regularly from 1981. Unlike in the Aurora series, the use of customer chassis was no longer permitted; rather, each team had to construct its own racing car. In the autumn, however, RAM did not have the logistical and technical requirements for the construction of a Formula 1 car.

The team, therefore, linked up with British racing car designer Robin Herd, who had been one of the founders of March Engineering in 1969 and was still one of the owners of the established racing car manufacturer. Herd and RAM founded the company March Grand Prix in the autumn of 1980, which was legally and organizationally independent and had nothing to do with March Engineering. No technology transfer with March Engineering, where Formula 2 cars were still being manufactured, took place. The cars were eventually assembled at March Engines, another independent company also owned by Robin Herd.

For reasons of better publicity, the car that Herd designed for RAM was given the type designation "March", and the model designation 811 also followed the nomenclature customary at March Engineering, according to which the first two digits documented the year of manufacture and the third digit the racing formula for whom the car was intended. In motorsport literature, the March 811 (just like its successor 821) is not seen as a member of the traditional March family; rather, it is occasionally described as "March who was no March".

RAM Racing competed under the name March Racing Team for the 1981 Formula 1 season.

== Construction: "March builds a Williams" ==
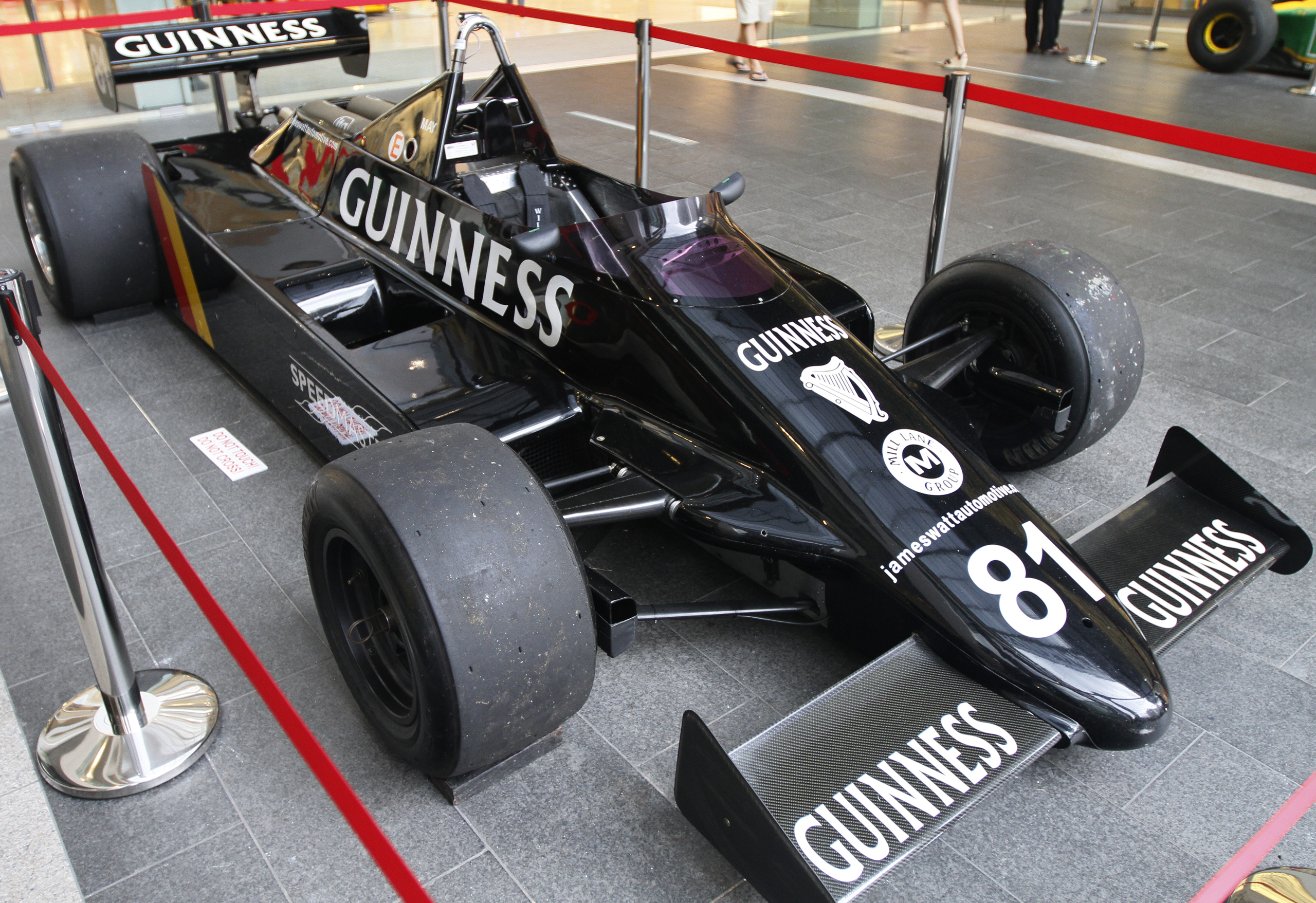
March 811 (this particular chassis was driven by Derek Daly)

Conceptually, the March 811 was a copy of the Williams FW07 that RAM had raced during the 1980 season. Ex-Chevron designer Paul Brown was given the job of producing the basic design, with 'managing input' from Robin Herd. Herd pushed for changes that would make the chassis cheaper to manufacture, which Brown resisted on the grounds that the modifications would result in a car that was both overweight and lacked stiffness.

The original FW07 was one of the first F1 cars to make use of carbon fibre reinforced plastics. Herd ordered these parts replaced with cheaper steel, aluminium and fibreglass components. The conflict between the two designers escalated to the point where Herd walked into the workshop where the chassis was being built and ordered the fabricators to substitute a cheaper grade of aluminium honeycomb than Brown had specified in his drawings. These changes resulted in the first three chassis tipping the scales at 632 kg, well above the minimum permissible weight of 580 kg.

When the cars proved to be exactly what Brown had predicted, Herd brought in Gordon Coppuck from March Engineering to attempt to improve the car. Coppuck tried to reduce the weight of the 811 by using a thinner gauge of aluminium for chassis 04 and 05, but this only exacerbated the 811's flexing issues. The flexing issue was so bad that at the 1981 Belgian Grand Prix, the RAM team attempted to make the car stiffer by adding a second aluminium skin to the chassis, something which did little to fix that problem but did add even more weight to an already heavy car.

Later in the year Herd brought in Adrian Reynard to 'fix' the car. Reynard shortened the wheelbase somewhat and made some other small changes, but the gist of his report to Herd was 'build the car that Paul designed'. The resulting Mk3 chassis that was the first 811 to hit the minimum weight target of 580 kg. While the 811 was ultimately a failure, Brown and Reynard got along well, and collaborated on and off for the next 30 years.

The 811 used internal torsion bar springs front and rear. The powerplant was a naturally aspirated Cosworth (DFV) engine, which was connected to a five-speed gearbox from Hewland (type FGA). The brakes came from AP, the tyres initially from Michelin, and later, from the French Grand Prix onwards, from Avon.

== Criticism of March 811 ==
John Macdonald, RAM Racing team boss, and client of the 811 was disappointed with the race car: “When I saw March GP doing a copy of a Williams, I knew they weren't serious. A copy is never as good as the original". Herd did it "in March's typical way: they cut corners and corners instead of using the same material as Williams". Outside observers felt that the March 811 was not only poorly designed but also poorly assembled. On the occasion of the Brazilian Grand Prix, in which suspension parts fell off the car, team boss John Macdonald told the press: "this car is a pile of shit, and that's official". Derek Daly described the vehicle as a "sleeper" and named the lack of quality as the main reason to leave the team for Theodore the following season.

== Production ==
March Engines built six examples of the March 811 between January and June 1981.

=== The individual chassis ===
- Chassis 811 RM01 was the prototype and the heaviest chassis of the entire series. It was initially not intended for racing use. Nevertheless, the works team reported it for Derek Daly for two races after the originally intended chassis (RM02) suffered considerable damage at the Brazilian Grand Prix.
- Derek Daly used chassis 811 RM02 in the first two World Championship rounds of the year. It was later temporarily replaced by the RM01 and RM05 chassis.
- Chassis 811 RM03 was identical to RM02. It was the first emergency vehicle for Daly's teammate Eliseo Salazar. After four races it was replaced by the RM04 chassis.
- Chassis 811 RM04 was a replacement for 811 RM03. It was lighter but much more flexible. It appeared in the Belgian Grand Prix and was driven twice by Salazar and then in two more races by Daly.
- Chassis 811 RM05 essentially corresponded to the RM04. It was also very flexible and was used only twice by Daly before taking over from Salazar's RM04 at the Spanish Grand Prix. In early 1982, the British racing team Colin Bennett Racing took over the RM05. He entered the car in three rounds of the 1982 British Formula One Championship in the spring of 1982 and in two rounds of the Can-Am Championship in the summer. The driver was Val Musetti. The car was then sold to Canadian team Gordon Lightfoot Racing, who entered it in four Can-Am races for John Graham.
- The RM06 is the last example of the 811 series. Based on the work of Adrian Reynard, it was again lighter but also more rideable than the previous examples. RM06 appeared at the British Grand Prix and was driven by Daly until the end of the season. This car was also taken over by Colin Bennett Racing in 1982.

== Overview: Use of the individual chassis in the 1981 Formula 1 season ==
| Grand Prix | 811 RM01 | 811 RM02 | 811 RM03 | 811 RM04 | 811 RM05 | 811 RM06 |
|---|---|---|---|---|---|---|
| United States | | Derek Daly | Eliseo Salazar | | | |
| Brazil | | Derek Daly | Eliseo Salazar | | | |
| Argentina | Derek Daly | | Eliseo Salazar | | | |
| San Marino | Derek Daly | | Eliseo Salazar | | | |
| Belgium | | | | Eliseo Salazar | Derek Daly | |
| Monaco | | | | Eliseo Salazar | Derek Daly | |
| Spain | | | | Derek Daly | | |
| France | | | | Derek Daly | | |
| United Kingdom | | | | | | Derek Daly |
| Germany | | | | | | Derek Daly |
| Austria | | | | | | Derek Daly |
| Netherlands | | | | | | Derek Daly |
| Italy | | | | | | Derek Daly |
| Canada | | | | | | Derek Daly |
| United States | | | | | | Derek Daly |

== Racing inserts ==
=== Formula One World Championship ===
In the 1981 Formula 1 season, the March 811s were used by the March Grand Prix team, which was in fact Team RAM Racing. The racing team was sponsored by the Irish brewery Guinness for most of the year's races. The cars were painted black with white sponsor lettering.

The team started the season with two drivers. For the first car, RAM committed the Chilean Formula 1 debutant Eliseo Salazar. Robin Herd wanted to give the second car to the Italian Teo Fabi, who had been the first to drive it, testing it in late November 1980 at Goodwood. However, RAM team boss John Macdonald chose the Irishman Derek Daly. Macdonald later publicly regretted this choice. [9]

The team debuted at the 1981 South African Grand Prix, a race that did not have World Championship status. For political reasons, only the teams organized in FOCA started here; Ferrari, Alfa Romeo, Osella and Renault were absent. In a field of just 18 drivers, Daly finished 11th and last; Salazar retired after 18 laps due to a gearbox failure.

Five weeks later, the World Championship began with the US West Grand Prix. Salazar was entered for the first six World Championship races. He only qualified for the San Marino Grand Prix; in all other races he failed in qualifying or pre-qualification. In Imola he retired after completing 38 laps due to an engine defect. After two more non-qualifications, Salazar gave up his involvement with RAM and joined rival team Ensign along with his sponsor. After Salazar's departure, the second March chassis was not reassigned; the team continued the season with just one car.

Daly contested all races of the 1981 season for RAM. At the beginning of the season he drove the chassis RM01, RM02 and RM03 twice. He did not qualify with any of the chassis. Only when he took over the RM04 chassis previously used by Salazar for the Spanish Grand Prix did he qualify for a race for the first time. In Spain he finished 16th, five laps down. From the British Grand Prix Daly had access to the new Adrian Reynard revised RM06 chassis fitted with Avon tyres. With the new chassis, Daly qualified regularly, apart from the last race of the season in Las Vegas. His best grid position was 17th in Great Britain; here he achieved the team's best result of the year with seventh place. However, the car continued to be unreliable. Four failures were due to technical defects.

RAM Racing did not score a championship point with the March 811.

=== 1982 British Formula One Championship ===
Colin Bennett Racing entered the 811 RM05 in the British Formula One Championship with Italian-British driver Valentino Musetti in the first half of 1982. The championship consisted of five races held on British circuits. During the year, seven teams with a total of 10 drivers took part in the series. Musetti contested the first three races of the season. At the Oulton Park International Gold Cup, Musetti failed due to technical reasons. The subsequent Caribbean Airways Trophy at Brands Hatch, in which only six drivers competed, Musetti finished third, and at the Rivet Supply Trophy at Thruxton he finished second. Musetti skipped the remaining two races of the British Formula 1 Championship.

=== 1982 Can-Am series ===
==== Colin Bennett Racing ====
In the summer of 1982, Colin Bennett Racing left the British Formula 1 championship and instead became involved in the North American Can-Am series. Vehicles with 5.0-liter eight-cylinder engines derived from standard engines were permitted there, as were Formula 1 cars with 3.0-liter racing engines. Colin Bennett Racing competed in two races in this series in the summer of 1982. The team entered the March 811 RM05 for Val Musetti and the 811 RM06 for Arnold Glass. The team debuted at the fourth race of the season at Elkhart Lake. Musetti qualified as the best driver with a 3.0-litre car in ninth place on the grid. He did not finish the race because the power transmission broke on the ninth lap. Glass started the race from 28th position and finished 17th. In the subsequent race in Trois-Rivières, Canada, Glass failed to qualify while Musetti placed 12th on the grid. Musetti did not finish this race either. Colin Bennett Racing then gave up participation in the Can-Am series.

==== Gordon Lightfoot Racing ====
After the Trois-Rivières race, Colin Bennett sold the March 811 RM05 to the Canadian team Gordon Lightfoot Racing. It started with John Graham in the last four races of the season. Graham finished all races. His best finish was eighth in the final race at Laguna Seca Raceway.

== 1981 Season ==
The car proved not very competitive, never reaching the points and often having difficulty in qualifying. The best result was a seventh-place finish with Derek Daly at the British Grand Prix.

In addition to Daly, the car was entrusted to the Chilean Eliseo Salazar, who however was never able to qualify. Only one car entrusted to the Irish driver was lined up from the Spanish Grand Prix.

The March team finished the 1981 Formula One World Championship season with 0 points.
