= Dywa Cars =

Italian racing car manufacturer, 1969–1986

Dywa
- Full name: Dywa Cars
- Base: Monza, Italy
- Founder(s): Dydo Monguzzi
- Noted drivers: (Italy) Piercarlo Ghinzani

Formula One World Championship career
- Races entered: 0
- Constructors' Championships: 0
- Drivers' Championships: 0
- Race victories: 0
- Pole positions: 0
- Fastest laps: 0

Dywa Cars was a racing car constructor from Italy, active in the 1970s and 1980s.

== History ==
The firm was founded in 1969 by Pietro "Dydo" Monguzzi, from Milan, with his brother-in-law Walter Nebuloni, to build cars for lower formulae in Italian domestic racing; the Dywa name is a combination of Dydo and Walter.

Nebuloni soon left the project, and the first cars produced by Dywa included a Formula 2 car, but it was not suitable for racing. The first Dywa to appear on international entry lists was a Formula 5000 car in 1975, powered by a Chevrolet engine. Driven by Luigi Cevasco, it failed to qualify for a couple of European Formula 5000 Championship races, and was entered for a number of races in 1976, never turning up.

=== Formula 1 ===
In 1979, Monguzzi produced a Cosworth DFV-powered Formula 1 car, dubbed the 008, at a motor show in Salerno. Its only appearance at a race was at the 1980 Monza Lotteria, then a round of the 1980 British Formula One Championship. European Formula 3 champion Piercarlo Ghinzani was persuaded to drive it, but the car - dubbed "a collection of square tubing randomly thrown around an aluminium monocoque-type structure which seems to lack any kind of unitary strength" and an "abysmal creation [which] looked like a relic from an O-level metalwork class" in Autosport - was 37 seconds off the pace, and never appeared again.

Monguzzi updated the car into another prototype, called the 010, in 1983, which was tested at Monza by Italian Formula 3 racer Giampiero Consonni, but it never appeared at a race meeting.

=== Formula 3000 ===
In 1986, Monguzzi teamed with Monaco-based racer Fulvio Ballabio, to turn the Dywa into a car for the second-tier Formula 3000 championship. Now dubbed the Monte Carlo MC001, and entered by Ballabio's Monte Carlo Automobile, it appeared at one race - the Trofeo Elio de Angelis at Imola - with Ballabio at the wheel. The time required to be one of the 26 qualifiers was 1 minute 41.7 seconds; Ballabio's best lap was over three minutes. Ballabio himself remarked that the car "made a Merzario look like a McLaren" and he gave up on the project.
