= 1982 British Formula One Championship =

Seasons
- ← 1980 none →

The 1982 British Formula One Championship was the fourth and final season of the British Formula One Championship. It commenced on 9 April 1982 and ended on 30 August after five races.

== Championship ==
After the Aurora company withdrew as the series' main sponsor in 1980, no championship was held in 1981. The series was revived in 1982 but with only a five round championship the series was only a shadow of its former self. Only ten drivers competed in the championship. The Drivers' Championship was dominated by Jim Crawford who claimed the championship in round four at Donington Park.

The opening round of the 1983 season was held at Oulton Park. The race won by Mike Wilds was the last British F1 Championship race as the undersubscribed series was disbanded after that event.

== Teams and drivers ==
Entry List
Team	No.	Driver	Chassis	Engine	Rounds
(United Kingdom) Team Ensign	3	(United Kingdom) Jim Crawford	Ensign N180B	Ford Cosworth DFV 3.0 V8	1-4
(United Kingdom) Team Ensign	4	(United States) Joe Castellano	Ensign N180B	Ford Cosworth DFV 3.0 V8	4-5
(United Kingdom) Colin Bennett Racing	6	(Australia) Arnold Glass	McLaren M29F	Ford Cosworth DFV 3.0 V8	1-4
(United Kingdom) Colin Bennett Racing	7	(United Kingdom) Valentino Musetti	March 811	Ford Cosworth DFV 3.0 V8	1-3
(United Kingdom) Team Sanada	8	(United Kingdom) Tony Trimmer	Fittipaldi F8	Ford Cosworth DFV 3.0 V8	1-3
(United Kingdom) Warren Booth	11	(United Kingdom) Warren Booth	Shadow DN9B	Ford Cosworth DFV 3.0 V8	All
(United Kingdom) Jordan BRM	12	(United Kingdom) David Williams	BRM P207	BRM P202 3.0 V12	3-5
(United Kingdom) Nick Mason	14	(United Kingdom) John Brindley	Tyrrell 008	Ford Cosworth DFV 3.0 V8	2, 4-5
(United Kingdom) EMKA Productions	16	(United Kingdom) Steve O'Rourke	Williams FW07	Ford Cosworth DFV 3.0 V8	3, 5
Team Peru	82	(Peru) Jorge Koechlin	Williams FW07	Ford Cosworth DFV 3.0 V8	4-5

== Results and standings ==
=== Races ===
Rnd	Track	Date	Laps	Pole position	Fastest lap	Race winner	Constructor
1	Oulton Park	9 April	65	(United Kingdom) Jim Crawford	(United Kingdom) Jim Crawford	(United Kingdom) Tony Trimmer	Fittipaldi
2	Brands Hatch	12 April	40	(United Kingdom) Tony Trimmer	(United Kingdom) Jim Crawford	(United Kingdom) Jim Crawford	Ensign
3	Thruxton	31 May	45	(United Kingdom) Jim Crawford	(United Kingdom) Jim Crawford	(United Kingdom) Jim Crawford	Ensign
4	Donington Park	15 August	50	(United Kingdom) Jim Crawford	(United Kingdom) Jim Crawford	(United Kingdom) Jim Crawford	Ensign
5	Brands Hatch	30 August	30	(Peru) Jorge Koechlin	(United States) Joe Castellano	(United States) Joe Castellano	Ensign

=== Drivers' standings ===
Points are awarded to the top ten classified finishers using the following structure:

Position	**1st**	**2nd**	**3rd**	**4th**	**5th**	**6th**	**PP**	**FL**
Points	9	6	4	3	2	1	1	1

Pos.	Driver	OUL (United Kingdom)	BRH (United Kingdom)	THR (United Kingdom)	DON (United Kingdom)	BRH (United Kingdom)	Pts
1	(United Kingdom) Jim Crawford	**Ret**	1	**1**	**1**		34
2	(United Kingdom) Tony Trimmer	1	**2**	Ret			16
3	(United States) Joe Castellano				3	1	14
4	(United Kingdom) Warren Booth	2	4	Ret	Ret	4	12
=	(Peru) Jorge Koechlin				2	**3**	12
6	(United Kingdom) John Brindley		5		4	2	11
7	(United Kingdom) Valentino Musetti	Ret	3	2			10
8	(United Kingdom) Steve O'Rourke			3		6	5
9	(Australia) Arnold Glass	NC	6	4	NC		4
10	(United Kingdom) David Williams			NC	NC	5	2
Pos.	Driver	OUL (United Kingdom)	BRH (United Kingdom)	THR (United Kingdom)	DON (United Kingdom)	BRH (United Kingdom)	Pts

Colour	Result
Gold	Winner
Silver	Second place
Bronze	Third place
Green	Points classification
Blue	Non-points classification
Blue	Non-classified finish (NC)
Purple	Retired, not classified (Ret)
Red	Did not qualify (DNQ)
Red	Did not pre-qualify (DNPQ)
Black	Disqualified (DSQ)
White	Did not start (DNS)
White	Withdrew (WD)
White	Race cancelled (C)
Blank	Did not practice (DNP)
Blank	Did not arrive (DNA)
Blank	Excluded (EX)

**Bold** – Pole
Italics – Fastest Lap
