= Eliseo Salazar =

Chilean racing driver (born 1954)

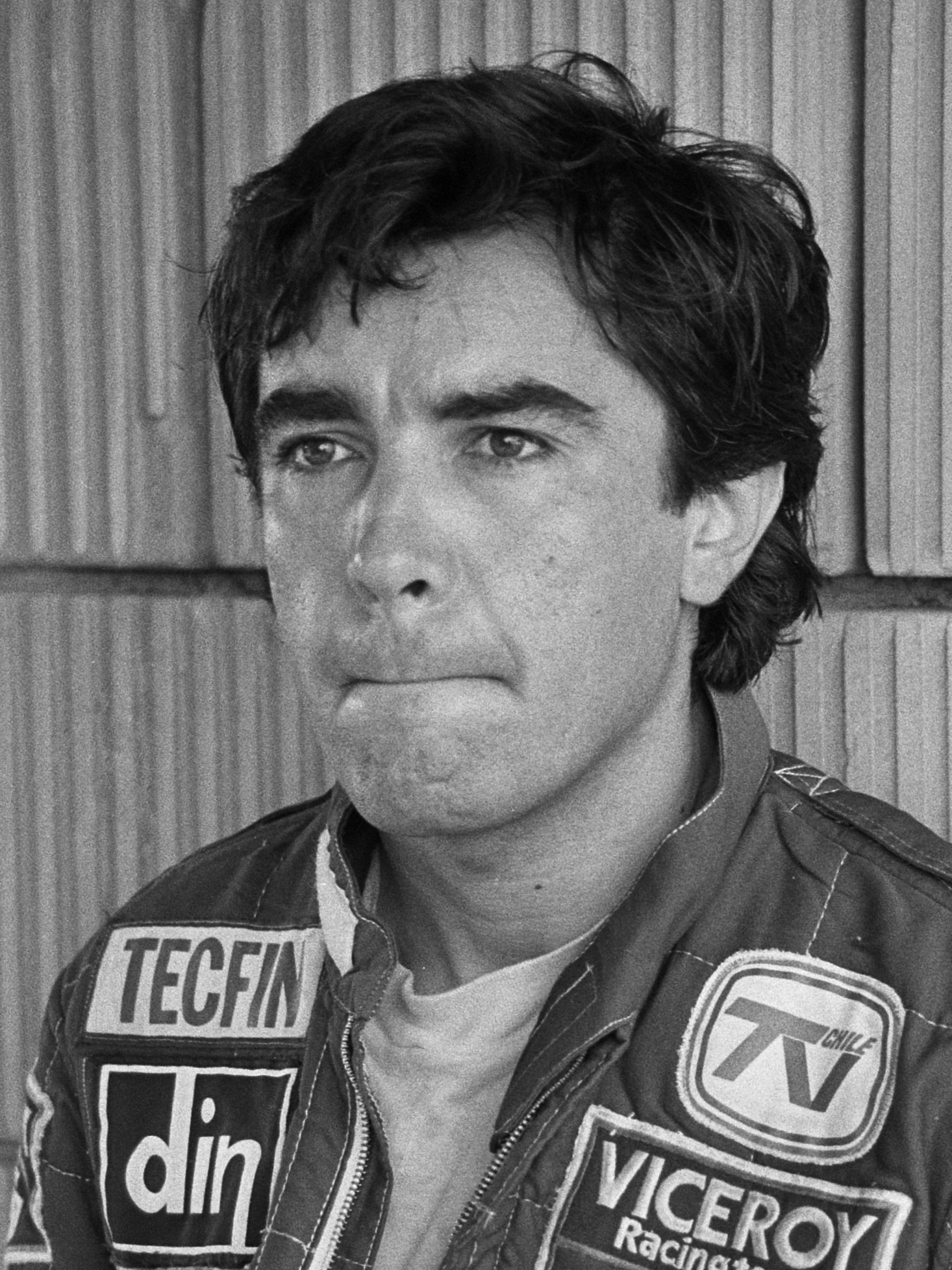
- Salazar at the 1982 Dutch Grand Prix
- Born: Eliseo Salazar Valenzuela; 14 November 1954 (age 72); Santiago, Chile
- Children: 3

Formula One World Championship career
- Nationality: (Chile) Chilean
- Active years: 1981–1983
- Team(s): March, Ensign, ATS, RAM
- Entries: 37 (24 starts)
- Championships: 0
- Wins: 0
- Podiums: 0
- Career points: 3
- Pole positions: 0
- Fastest laps: 0
- First entry: 1981 United States Grand Prix West
- Last entry: 1983 Belgian Grand Prix

British Formula One Championship career
- Years active: 1980
- Teams: RAM
- Starts: 12
- Championships: 0
- Wins: 3
- Podiums: 5
- Poles: 6
- Fastest laps: 3

World Rally Championship record
- Years active: 2012
- Co-driver: (Spain) Marc Martí
- Teams: Privateer Mini
- Rallies: 1
- Championships: 0
- Rally wins: 0
- Podiums: 0
- Total points: 0
- First rally: 2012 Rally Argentina

IndyCar Series career
- 53 races run over 7 years
- Teams: Scandia, Riley & Scott, Panoz, A. J. Foyt
- Best finish: 4th (2000)
- First race: 1996 Indianapolis 500 (Indy)
- Last race: 2002 Chevy 500 (Texas)
- First win: 1997 Las Vegas 500K (Las Vegas)
Wins	Podiums	Poles
1	4	0

24 Hours of Le Mans career
- Years: 1982–1983, 1988–1990, 1997
- Teams: Dome, Spice, Jaguar, Pacific
- Best finish: 8th (1989)
- Class wins: 0

Previous series
- 2003; 1994–1997; 1988–1990; 1986–1987: ALMS; IMSA GT; World Sportscar; International F3000

Awards
- 1999; 1990: Scott Brayton Trophy; Autosport Sportsman of the Year

Eliseo Salazar Valenzuela (Spanish pronunciation: [e.liˈse.o sa.laˈsaɾ ba.lẽnˈswe.la]; born 14 November 1954) is a Chilean former racing driver, who competed in Formula One from 1981 to 1983. Salazar remains the only Chilean driver to compete in Formula One.

Salazar made his Formula One debut at the 1981 United States Grand Prix West, scoring a total of three championship points across 37 Grands Prix. After Formula One, Salazar participated in several motorsport disciplines, becoming the Chilean national rally champion in 1984 and 1985. Across a three-decade career, Salazar also competed in American open-wheel racing and sportscar racing.

== Career ==
=== Formula One (1981–1983) ===
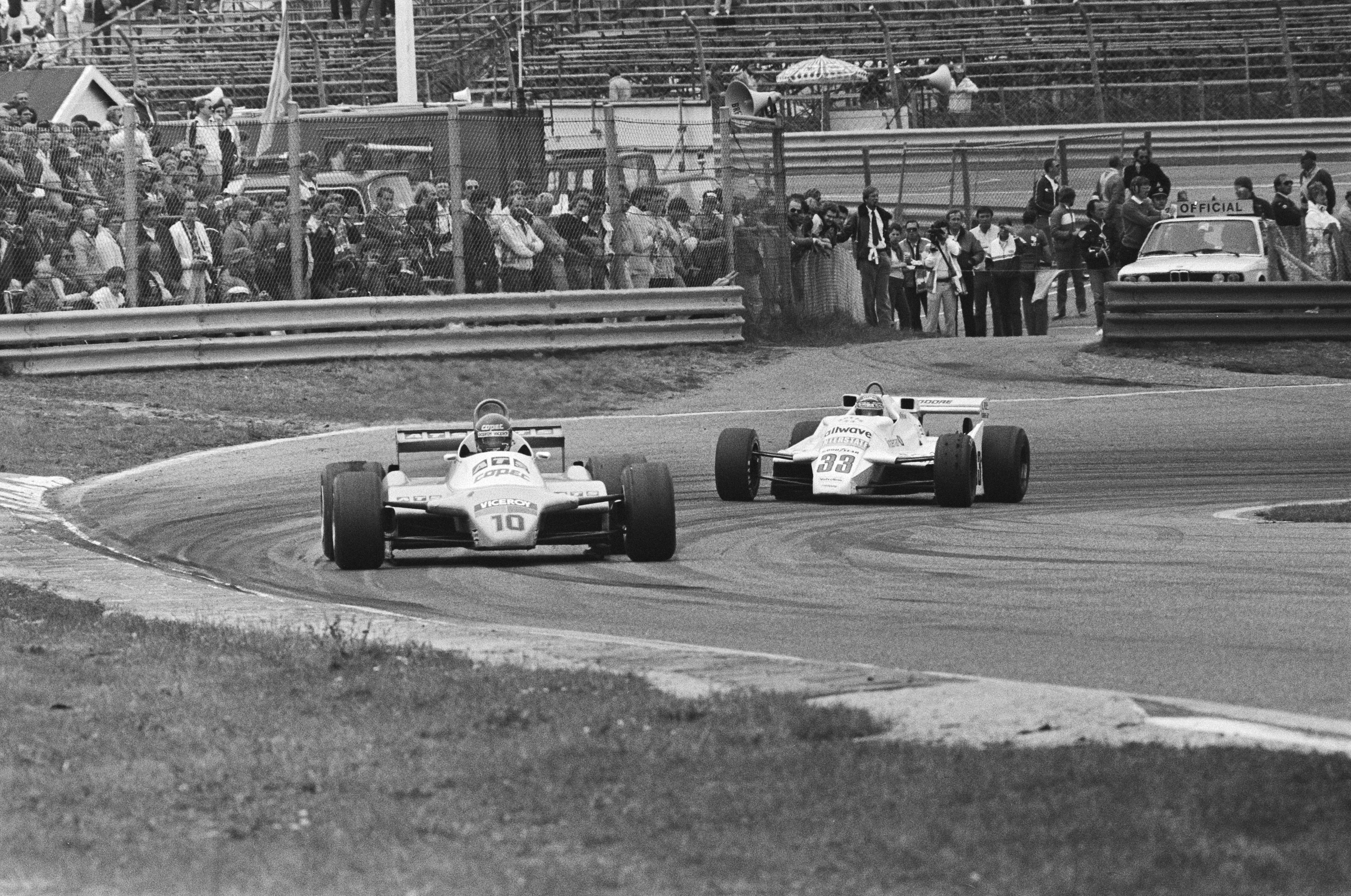
Salazar (front) at the 1982 Dutch Grand Prix

After racing in the British F1 Championship in 1980 with a Williams FW07, and winning the BRDC International Trophy at Silverstone, Salazar moved to Formula One in 1981, with March. He switched midseason to Ensign, and finished sixth in the Dutch Grand Prix. In 1982, he drove for ATS, and finished fifth in the San Marino Grand Prix, a race where only seven teams entered due to the FISA–FOCA war. His most noted career moment in Formula One came when he collided with the overtaking race leader Nelson Piquet in the 1982 German Grand Prix; after both drivers got out of their stricken cars, the angry Piquet started to punch and kick Salazar. In 1983, he entered six races with RAM Racing, but the car was very slow and he only managed to qualify twice. He finished fourteenth in Jacarepaguá and retired in Long Beach with gearbox failure.

After the Chilean economic crisis in the early years of the 80's, Salazar had to leave F1, and competed with little success at the Formula 3000 championship and the South American Formula Three Championship in some races. He began to race rally in Chile, becoming the champion of the 1985 hill-climbing season in Chile in a Toyota Corolla XT.

=== Sports prototypes (1988–1990) ===
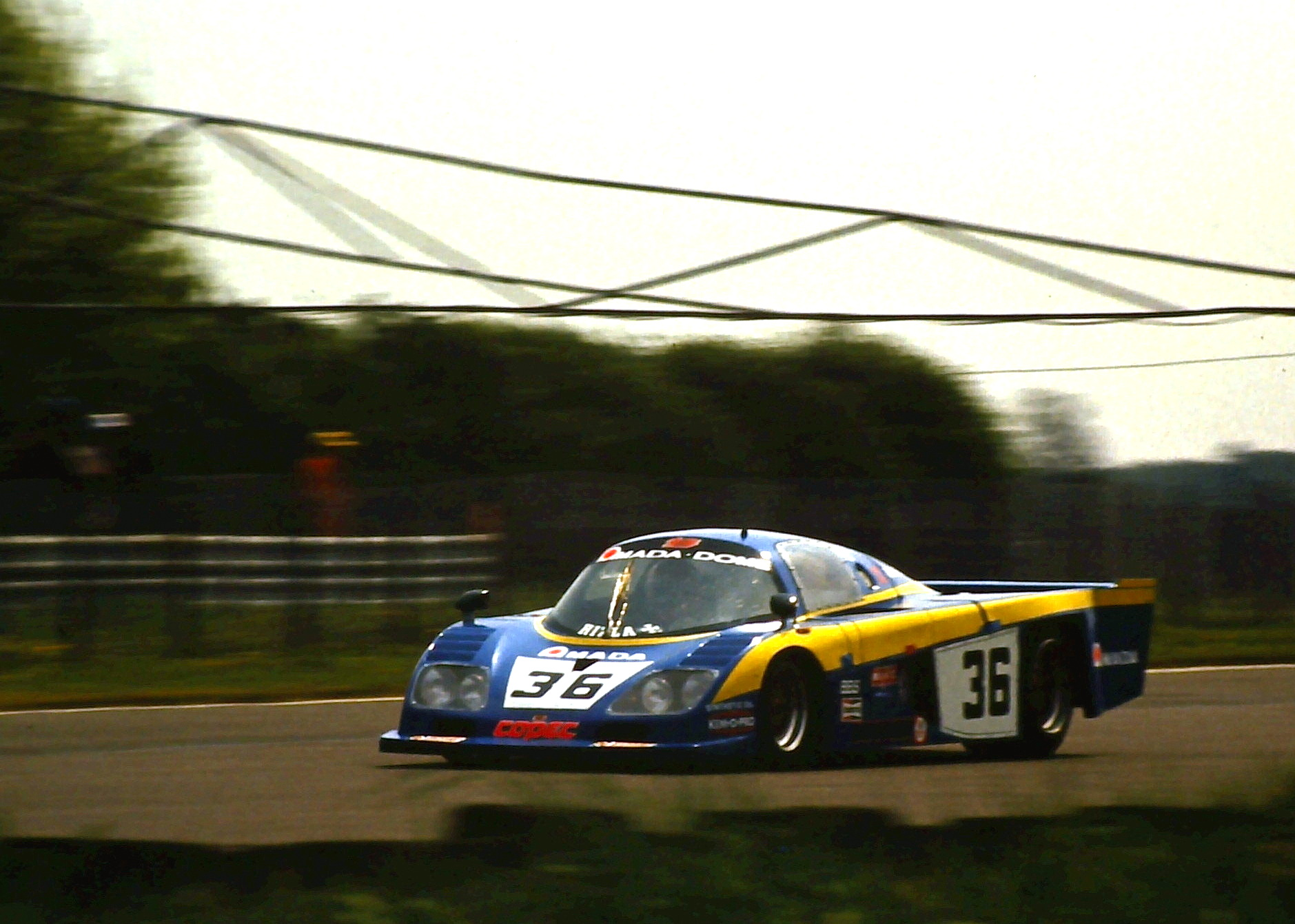
Salazar competing in the 1982 Silverstone 6 Hours

In the late 1980s, Salazar drove some races in the FIA World Sports Prototype Championship. His best result was first place at the C-1 class in the 1988 Fuji 1000 km in Japan with a Spice SE88C-Ford of the Spice Engineering team. Thanks to his contacts with Tom Walkinshaw, he joined the Jaguar Silk Cut factory team, to compete in the 24 Hours of Le Mans. In the 1989 race, the Chilean, with Alain and Michel Ferté, achieved the eighth place with the Jaguar XJR-9; but his best result would be winning the 1990 event of the historic race in a Jaguar XJR-12, but after driving several hours in the No. 3 car, he was forced to leave his seat to the British driver Martin Brundle, who received the chequered flag, and Salazar was forced to move to the No. 4 car, which retired at twenty hours with mechanical problems (Brundle's original car, the No. 1, was pulled out at fourteen hours for electrical problems). For that particular fact, he was named the 1990 Sportsman of the Year by the British magazine Autosport.

=== Career in USA (1994–2002) ===
After years with no competition, working as a co-host in the TV show "Video Loco" (America's Funniest Videos' Chilean version, broadcast in Canal 13), Salazar received an opportunity to join the Ferrari-Momo factory team for the 1994 IMSA Sport Prototype championship in the WSC (World Sport Car) series, with the Italian Gianpiero Moretti. He raced at the Exxon World Sports Car Championship in 1994 and 1995 with several races won and podiums with the Ferrari 333 SP. Those results were good enough to pull him to the Indy Car World Series.

Salazar signed a contract with the Dick Simon Racing in 1995 to race in the CART Indy Car World Series, with a strong debut at the Indy 500. With a Lola-Cosworth, he started 33rd and finished fourth in the Cristal-Copec-Mobil 1 No.7.

When the IRL and CART split in 1996, Salazar chose to compete in the new series. He became a regular top driver at Indy 500 with four top-ten results. His best result at Indianapolis was in 2000, when he started and finished on third place, at the wheel of a G-Force-Oldsmobile Aurora for A. J. Foyt Enterprises.

In 1997, Salazar earned his first and only victory in IRL racing, at the Las Vegas Motor Speedway, racing for Team Scandia. That year, he also made his only start at a NASCAR sanctioned race, finishing 17th on the Watkins Glen International road course, in the Craftsman Truck Series.

2000 and 2001 were the best years in the IRL for Salazar, finishing fourth and fifth in those championships, with five top-five results in 2000. In 2002, he suffered a serious accident testing at Indianapolis, and was forced miss several races. After much consideration Salazar decided to retire from Indy Car racing and focus on Sports Cars.

Salazar later joined the American Le Mans Series, where he raced in a Porsche 911 GT3 and a Ferrari 360.

=== Present and future (2004–) ===
Salazar then returned to Chile where, in 2004, he joined the official Hyundai rally team in the Rally Mobil, the national rally championship. His car was an N3-class Hyundai Coupe GK 2.0L.

In November 2005, Salazar competed in the inaugural race of the Grand Prix Masters, as a late replacement for Alan Jones. In 2006, he raced in both GPM races in Qatar and England.

In 2007, Salazar moved to the N4-class of the Rally Mobil, the Chilean Rally Championship, driving a Mitsubishi Lancer Evo IX, and was 5th in his first year at the N4-Class with a car of the ING Team.

Salazar's last international project is to race the Lisboa-Dakar rally, with the objective of being the first driver to have raced in the Monaco Grand Prix, the Le Mans 24 Hours, the 24 Hours of Daytona, the Indianapolis 500 and the Dakar Rally. In February. he signed a pre-contract with Jean-Louis Schlesser to drive one of his buggies at the 2008 Dakar Rally, but he could not get a deal with a sponsor and that year's running of the Dakar Rally was cancelled anyway.

In 2008, Salazar raced in the Rally Mobil with his own team, formed by 3 Mitsubishi Lancer Evo IX in the N4-Class.

Salazar made his debut in the Dakar Rally in 2009 with a McRae Prototype, finishing in 88th place. He would compete in the 2010 edition as part of the Team Dakar USA, in a third Hummer H3, in addition to the ones raced by owner Robby Gordon and Frenchman Eric Vigouroux.

In 2013, Salazar introduced autocross (aka "solo racing") to Chile, with the first event being held 6 April 2013 at Estadio Monumental in Santiago. In September 2013, he participated in the Sports Car Club of America Solo National Championships in Lincoln, Nebraska, driving a C Prepared Ford Mustang.

== Personal life ==
On 15 May 2001, Salazar had a son, also named Eliseo. The younger Salazar attended his first Indy 500 at the age of eight days old.

== Motorsports career results ==
=== Complete British Formula One Championship results ===
(key) (Races in bold indicate pole position; races in italics indicate fastest lap)

Year	Entrant	Chassis	Engine	1	2	3	4	5	6	7	8	9	10	11	12	Pos.	Pts
1980	RAM Racing Team	Williams FW07	Ford Cosworth DFV 3.0 V8	OUL; Ret	BRH; 3	**SIL**; 1	**MAL**; Ret	**THR**; 1	MNZ; Ret							2nd	52
1980	RAM Racing Team	Williams FW07B	Ford Cosworth DFV 3.0 V8							MAL; 7	**SNE**; 2	BRH; Ret	**THR**; 1	**OUL**; Ret	SIL; Ret	2nd	52

=== Formula One World Championship ===
(key)

Year	Entrant	Chassis	Engine	1	2	3	4	5	6	7	8	9	10	11	12	13	14	15	16	WDC	Pts
1981	March Grand Prix Team	March 811	Ford Cosworth DFV 3.0 V8	USW; DNQ	BRA; DNQ	ARG; DNQ	SMR; Ret	BEL; DNQ	MON; DNPQ											18th	1
1981	Ensign Racing	Ensign N180B	Ford Cosworth DFV 3.0 V8							ESP; 14	FRA; Ret	GBR; DNQ	GER; NC	AUT; Ret	NED; 6	ITA; Ret	CAN; Ret	CPL; Ret		18th	1
1982	Team ATS	ATS D5	Ford Cosworth DFV 3.0 V8	RSA; 9	BRA; Ret	USW; Ret	SMR; 5	BEL; Ret	MON; Ret	DET; Ret	CAN; Ret	NED; 13	GBR; DNQ	FRA; Ret	GER; Ret	AUT; DNQ	SUI; 14	ITA; 9	CPL; DNQ	22nd	2
1983	RAM Automotive Team March	RAM March 01	Ford Cosworth DFV 3.0 V8	BRA; 15	USW; Ret	FRA; DNQ	SMR; DNQ	MON; DNQ	BEL; DNQ	DET	CAN	GBR	GER	AUT	NED	ITA	EUR	RSA		NC	0

=== 24 Hours of Le Mans results ===
Year	Team	Co-Drivers	Car	Class	Laps	Pos.	Class Pos.
1982	(Japan) Dome Co. Ltd.	(United Kingdom) Chris Craft	Dome RC82-Ford Cosworth	C	85	DNF	DNF
1983	(Japan) Dome Racing	(United Kingdom) Chris Craft (United Kingdom) Nick Mason	Dome RC82-Ford Cosworth	C	75	DNF	DNF
1988	(United Kingdom) Spice Engineering	(Italy) Almo Coppelli (Denmark) Thorkild Thyrring	Spice SE88C-Ford Cosworth	C2	281	DNF	DNF
1989	(United Kingdom) Silk Cut Jaguar (United Kingdom) Tom Walkinshaw Racing	(France) Alain Ferté (France) Michel Ferté	Jaguar XJR-9LM	C1	368	8th	7th
1990	(United Kingdom) Silk Cut Jaguar (United Kingdom) Tom Walkinshaw Racing	(United States) Davy Jones (France) Michel Ferté	Jaguar XJR-12	C1	282	DNF	DNF
1997	(United Kingdom) Pacific Racing Ltd.	(Finland) Harri Toivonen (Spain) Jesús Pareja	BRM P301-Nissan	LMP	6	DNF	DNF

=== International Formula 3000 ===
(key) (Races in bold indicate pole position; races in italics indicate fastest lap.)

Year	Entrant	Chassis	Engine	1	2	3	4	5	6	7	8	9	10	11	Pos.	Pts
1986	RAM Motorsport	RAM 04	Cosworth	SIL	VLL; 11	PAU; DNQ	SPA; 21	IMO; Ret	MUG; DNQ	PER; DNQ	ÖST				19th	1.5
1986	Lola Motorsport	Lola T86/50	Cosworth									BIR; 4	BUG; 12	JAR; Ret	19th	1.5
1987	Bromley Motorsport	Ralt RT21	Cosworth	SIL; 9	VLL; DNQ	SPA; 17	PAU; Ret	DON; 18	PER; Ret						NC	0
1987	Colin Bennett Racing	March 87B	Cosworth							BRH; 18	BIR; DNQ	IMO; 14			NC	0
1987	Genoa Racing	March 87B	Cosworth										BUG; Ret	JAR; DNQ	NC	0

=== American open-wheel racing ===
(key)

==== PPG Indycar Series ====
(key) (Races in bold indicate pole position)

Year	Team	No.	Chassis	Engine	1	2	3	4	5	6	7	8	9	10	11	12	13	14	15	16	17	Pos.	Pts	Ref
1995	Dick Simon Racing	7	Lola T95/00	Ford XB V8t	MIA; 17	SRF; 10	PHX; 15		NAZ; 12	INDY; 4	MIL; 16	DET; 20	POR; 15	ROA; 18	TOR; 21	CLE; 10	MCH; 18	MDO; 13	NHA; 13	VAN; 13	LAG; DNQ	21st	19	
1995	Dick Simon Racing	7	Lola T94/00	Ford XB V8t				LBH; 24														21st	19	
1996	Dick Simon Racing	7	Lola T96/00	Ford XB V8t	MIA	RIO	SRF	LBH	NAZ	500	MIL; 21	DET	POR; 18	CLE	TOR	MCH; 11	MDO; 15	ROA	VAN	LAG		30th	2	

==== IndyCar Series ====
(key) (Races in bold indicate pole position)

Year	Team	No.	Chassis	Engine	1	2	3	4	5	6	7	8	9	10	11	12	13	14	15	Pos.	Pts	Ref
1996	Team Scandia	7	Lola T95/00	Ford XB V8t	WDW; Wth	PHX	INDY; 6													23rd	58	
1996–1997	Team Scandia	7	Lola T95/00	Ford XB V8t	NHA; 9	LVS; 7	WDW	PHX												9th	208	
1996–1997	Team Scandia	7	Dallara IR7	Oldsmobile Aurora V8					INDY; 24	TXS; 7	PPR; 12	CLT; 10	NHA; 4	LVS; 1						9th	208	
1998	Riley & Scott Cars	15	Riley & Scott MkV	Oldsmobile Aurora V8	WDW; 12	PHX; 23	INDY; DNQ	TXS; 23	NHA; 6	DOV; DNS	CLT	PPR	ATL	TXS	LVS					29th	60	
1999	Nienhouse Racing	6	G-Force GF01	Oldsmobile Aurora V8	WDW; DNQ	PHX; 20	CLT; C	INDY; 33	TXS; 5	PPR; 20	ATL; 4	DOV; 18	PPR; 19	LVS; 12	TXS; 17					20th	137	
2000	A. J. Foyt Racing	11	G-Force GF05	Oldsmobile Aurora V8	WDW; 5	PHX; 4	LVS; 18	INDY; 3	TXS; 17	PPR; 6	ATL; 10	KTY; 25	TXS; 5							4th	210	
2001	A. J. Foyt Enterprises	14	Dallara IR-01	Oldsmobile Aurora V8	PHX; 2	HMS; 3	ATL; 5	INDY; 7	TXS; 7	PPR; 14	RIR; 12	KAN; 7	NSH; 11	KTY; 15	GAT; 17	CHI; 18	TXS; 4			5th	308	
2002	A. J. Foyt Enterprises	11	Dallara IR-02	Chevrolet Indy V8	HMS; 5	PHX; 4	FON; 15	NAZ	INDY	TXS	PPR	RIR	KAN	NSH; 19	MCH; 19	KTY; 14	GAT; 14	CHI; 18	TXS; 16	20th	157	

==== Indianapolis 500 results ====
Year	Chassis	Engine	Start	Finish	Team
1995	Lola	Cosworth	24	4	Dick Simon Racing
1996	Lola	Cosworth	3	6	Team Scandia
1997	Dallara	Oldsmobile	9	24	Team Scandia
1998	Riley & Scott	Oldsmobile	DNQ		Riley & Scott Racing
1999	G-Force	Oldsmobile	18	33	Nienhouse Racing
2000	G-Force	Oldsmobile	3	3	A. J. Foyt Racing
2001	Dallara	Chevrolet	28	7	A. J. Foyt Racing

=== NASCAR ===
(key) (Bold – Pole position awarded by qualifying time. Italics – Pole position earned by points standings or practice time. * – Most laps led.)

==== Craftsman Truck Series ====
NASCAR Craftsman Truck Series results
Year	Team	No.	Make	1	2	3	4	5	6	7	8	9	10	11	12	13	14	15	16	17	18	19	20	21	22	23	24	25	26	NCTC	Pts	Ref
1997	Doran Racing	77	Chevy	WDW	TUS	HOM	PHO	POR	EVG	I70	NHA	TEX	BRI	NZH	MLW	LVL	CNS	HPT	IRP; DNQ	FLM	NSV	GLN; 17	RCH	MAR	SON	MMR	CAL	PHO	LVS	93rd	149	

=== Complete Grand Prix Masters results ===
(key) Races in bold indicate pole position, races in italics indicate fastest lap.

Year	Team	Chassis	Engine	1	2	3	4	5
2005	Team Altech	Delta Motorsport GPM	Nicholson McLaren 3.5 V8	RSA; 10				
2006	Team Phantom	Delta Motorsport GPM	Nicholson McLaren 3.5 V8	QAT; Ret	ITA; C	GBR; Ret	MAL; C	RSA; C

=== Dakar Rally results ===
Year	Class	Vehicle	Position	Stages won	Ref
2009	Cars	(United Kingdom) McRae	88th	0	
2011	Cars	(United States) Hummer	DNF	0	

=== World Rally Championship ===
Year	Entrant	Car	1	2	3	4	5	6	7	8	9	10	11	12	13	WDC	Pts
2012	Eliseo Salazar	Mini John Cooper Works WRC	MON	SWE	MEX	POR	ARG; 12	GRE	NZL	FIN	GER	GBR	FRA	ITA	ESP	NC	0

Awards
Preceded by Roberto Guerrero	Scott Brayton Award; 1999	Succeeded by Eddie Cheever
