= Jim Crawford (racing driver) =

British racing driver (1948–2002)

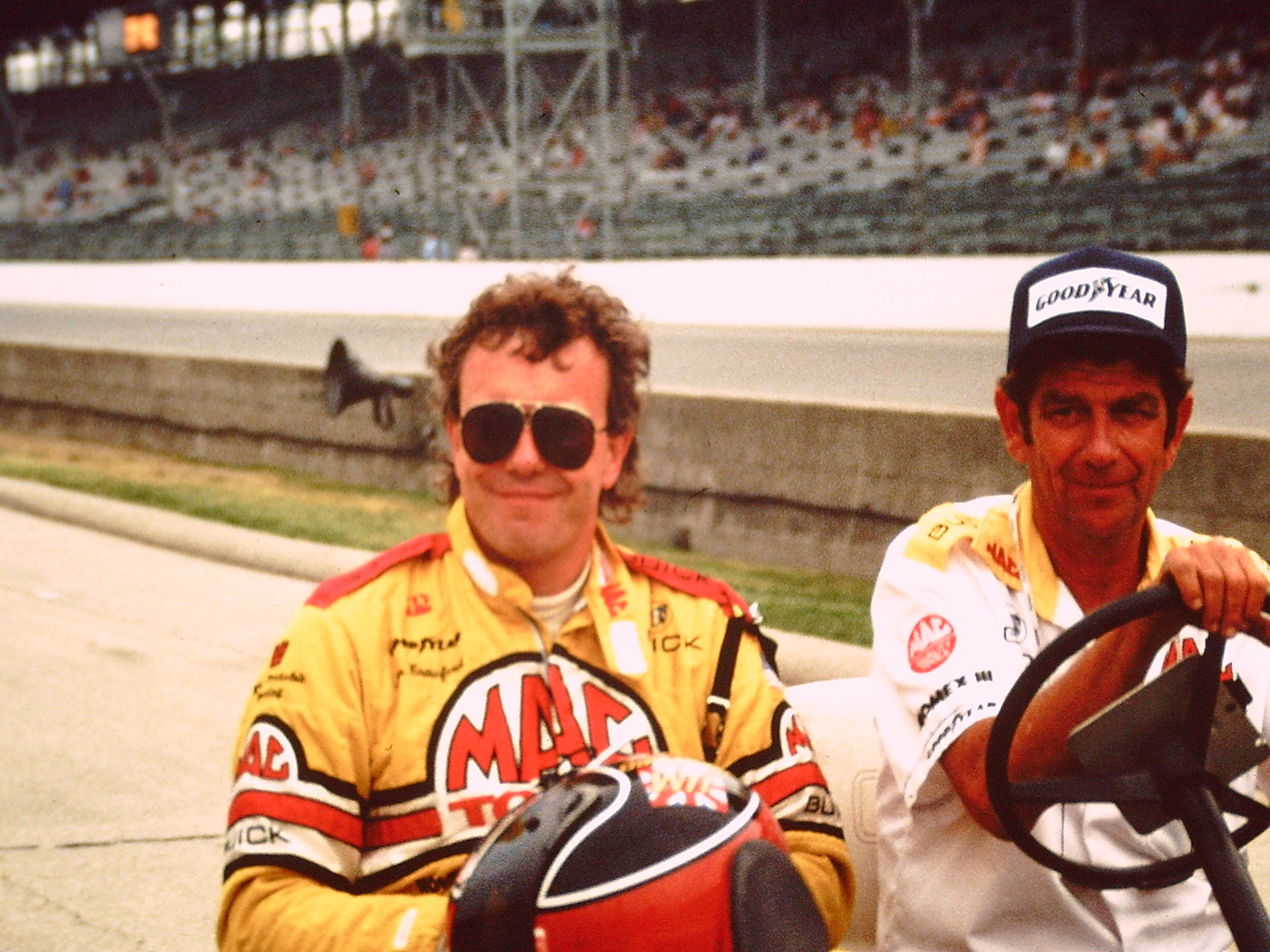
- Crawford at the 1988 Indianapolis 500
- Born: James Alan Crawford; 13 February 1948; Dunfermline, Fife, Scotland
- Died: 6 August 2002 (aged 54); Tierra Verde, Florida, U.S.

Formula One World Championship career
- Nationality: (United Kingdom) British
- Active years: 1975
- Team: Lotus
- Entries: 2
- Championships: 0
- Wins: 0
- Podiums: 0
- Career points: 0
- Pole positions: 0
- Fastest laps: 0
- First entry: 1975 British Grand Prix
- Last entry: 1975 Italian Grand Prix

British Formula One Championship career
- Active years: 1980, 1982
- Entries: 15
- Championships: 1 (1982)
- Wins: 4
- Podiums: 5
- Career points: 58
- Pole positions: 3
- Fastest laps: 4

Championship titles
- 1982 1984, 1985: British Formula One Championship; Indian Formula Pacific Series

James Alan Crawford (13 February 1948 – 6 August 2002) was a British racing driver from Scotland.

== Career ==
Crawford's first motorsport experience came behind the wheel of a Mini that he drove in several rallies. After an unsuccessful stint in Formula Ford he landed a drive in his friend Stephen Choularton's team in Formula Atlantic, after showing great promise in a couple of Formula Libre races at Croft. He went on to spend a number of years driving alongside Choularton at SDC Racing in Formula Atlantic and was spotted by Lotus Cars and offered a test drive by them.

Crawford participated in two World Championship Formula One Grands Prix, debuting on 19 July 1975. He was also the winner of the 1982 British Formula One Championship. He is notable for being the 500th person to start a Formula One World Championship race.

Crawford moved to the United States in the early 1980s, finishing runner-up twice in the Can-Am series. He finished fourth on his CART debut at Long Beach in 1984 and went on to become a regular in the Indianapolis 500. It was there in 1987 that Crawford suffered a crash in practice which resulted in serious leg injuries. However, he recovered sufficiently to return to the 500 in 1988, leading the race for a few laps. A late-race puncture dropped him from second to sixth.

Crawford's final 500 was in 1993, although he made unsuccessful attempts to qualify old cars in 1994 and 1995.

== 1988 Indianapolis 500 ==
Crawford's most notable run at Indy occurred in 1988. After nearly a year of rehabilitation from leg and foot injuries, Crawford returned for the 1988 Indianapolis 500. He signed with King Racing as a teammate to Johnny Rutherford, driving a Buick entry. He was a last-minute addition to the team, joining just prior to opening day. He made little headlines during time trials, quietly making the field late on the second day. He was still recovering from his leg injuries, and walked the month with the aid of a cane.

On race day, however, Crawford created quite a stir. The race was dominated by the Penske Team, however, Crawford was in contention all afternoon, and was the only driver other than the Penske cars to lead laps during the race. Crawford took the lead near the midpoint, and led eight laps. He drove a highly aggressive race, dicing in and out of traffic at will, and frequently dropping well below the white lines in the turns. Crawford set a blistering pace during his stint in the lead, and was running second as late as lap 194. With six laps to go, he got sideways in turn three, and flat-spotted his tires. He ducked into the pits for new tires, but the crew had difficulties, and he lost several seconds. He lost a lap, and finished sixth. It was the highest finish at the time for the Buick V6 Indy engine, and Crawford was praised for his strong effort.

== Later years ==
Crawford returned to Indy in 1989 with high expectations after his 1988 performance. He qualified fourth, the highest of the non-Chevrolet teams, but dropped out with mechanical problems on race day.

In 1990, Crawford joined the Menard team, and during practice, suffered a spectacular crash. He spun and hit the wall in turn one, then became airborne 10–15 feet above the ground in the south short chute. He was not seriously injured. He finished 15th on race day.

Crawford's final notable appearance at Indy was in 1992. Crawford re-joined the King Racing team, as a teammate to Roberto Guerrero driving once again the Buick V-6 engine. Crawford and Guerrero led the speed charts all through practice, with Crawford setting an all-time unofficial track record of 233.433 mph. Both drivers were heavy favourites for the pole position, but on the morning of pole day, Crawford blew an engine. Rain pushed time trials into the next day, which gave the team time to install a new engine. However, on the second day, he blew another engine, and wound up missing his opportunity to qualify during the pole round. He qualified sixth fastest, but as a second day qualifier, lined up 21st. On race day, he was a factor early, but crashed out on lap 75 collecting Rick Mears.

The 1988 race would end up being Crawford's best Indy finish (sixth), and his final start came in 1993. He failed to qualify in 1994–1995, and retired from driving.

== Personal life ==
After his retirement from racing, Crawford lived in St. Petersburg, Florida, where he bought a fishing boat he used for charters. He died in 2002 of liver failure. He was survived by his second wife Annie and his children from his first marriage, Geoffrey and Emily.

== Racing record ==
=== Complete Formula One World Championship results ===
(key)

Year	Entrant	Chassis	Engine	1	2	3	4	5	6	7	8	9	10	11	12	13	14	WDC	Pts
1975	John Player Special Team Lotus	Lotus 72E	Ford Cosworth DFV 3.0 V8	ARG	BRA	RSA	ESP	MON	BEL	SWE	NED	FRA	GBR; Ret	GER	AUT			NC	0
1975	John Player Special Team Lotus	Lotus 72F	Ford Cosworth DFV 3.0 V8													ITA; 13	USA	NC	0

=== Complete Formula One non-championship results ===
(key)

Year	Entrant	Chassis	Engine	1	2	3
1975	John Player Special Team Lotus	Lotus 72E	Ford Cosworth DFV 3.0 V8	ROC	INT; DNS	SUI

=== Complete European Formula Two Championship results ===
(key) (Races in bold indicate pole position; races in italics indicate fastest lap)

Year	Entrant	Chassis	Engine	1	2	3	4	5	6	7	8	9	10	11	12	13	14	Pos.	Pts
1975	SDC Racing	Chevron B29	Ford	EST	THR	HOC	NÜR	PAU	HOC	SAL	ROU	MUG	PER	SIL; Ret	ZOL	NOG	VAL	NC	0
1980	Plygrange Racing	Chevron B45	Ford	THR	HOC	NÜR	VAL	PAU	SIL; Ret	ZOL; 10	MUG	ZAN	PER	MIS	HOC			NC	0
1981	Plygrange Racing	Toleman TG280	Hart	SIL; 4	HOC; 7	THR; Ret	NÜR; Ret	VAL; 9	MUG; 11	PAU; 10	PER	SPA; 6	DON; 9	MIS; 7	MAN; 10			16th	4

=== Complete Shellsport International Series results ===
(key) (Races in bold indicate pole position; races in italics indicate fastest lap)

Year	Entrant	Chassis	Engine	1	2	3	4	5	6	7	8	9	10	11	12	13	Pos.	Pts
1976	Peter Williams	Chevron B29	Ford BDA Nicholson 1.6 L4	MAL	SNE	OUL; 5	BRH; Ret	THR; DNS	BRH	MAL	SNE	BRH	THR	OUL	BRH		24th	11
1976	Marshall Wingfield	Chevron B34	Ford BDA Hart 1.6 L4													BRH; 8	24th	11

=== Complete British Formula One Championship results ===
(key) (Races in bold indicate pole position; races in italics indicate fastest lap)

Year	Entrant	Chassis	Engine	1	2	3	4	5	6	7	8	9	10	11	12	Pos.	Pts
1980	Plygrange Racing	Chevron B45	Ford BDX 2.0 L4	OUL; 4	BRH	SIL; 6	MAL; 3	THR; 13	MNZ; Ret	MAL; 4	SNE; 4	BRH; 6	THR; Ret	OUL; 1	SIL; 8	4th	24
1982	Team Ensign	Ensign N180B	Ford Cosworth DFV 3.0 V8	**OUL**; Ret	BRH; 1	**THR**; 1	**DON**; 1	BRH								1st	34

=== Complete World Sportscar Championship results ===
(key) (Races in bold indicate pole position) (Races in italics indicate fastest lap)

Year	Entrant	Class	Chassis	Engine	1	2	3	4	5	6	7	8	Pos.	Pts
1982	Vesuvio Racing	Gr.5	Lancia Beta Monte Carlo	Lancia 1.4 L4t	MNZ	SIL; 10	NÜR	LMS	SPA	MUG	FUJ	BRH	103rd	2

=== American open-wheel racing ===
(key) (Races in bold indicate pole position)

==== PPG Indy Car World Series ====
Year	Team	Chassis	Engine	1	2	3	4	5	6	7	8	9	10	11	12	13	14	15	16	17	Pos.	Pts	Ref
1984	Ed Wachs Motor Sports	Theodore T83	Cosworth DFX V8t	LBH; 4	PHX	INDY; DNQ	MIL	POR	MEA; 21	CLE	MCH	ROA	POC	MDO	SAN	MCH	PHX				27th	12	
1984	H&R Racing	March 82/83C	Cosworth DFX V8t															LAG; 23	CPL		27th	12	
1985	Wysard Racing	Lola T900	Cosworth DFX V8t	LBH; 4	INDY; 16	MIL; DNS	POR	MEA; 9	CLE; 13	MCH	ROA	POC	MDO								20th	16	
1985	Canadian Tire Racing	Lola T900	Cosworth DFX V8t											SAN; 20	MCH	LAG					20th	16	
1985	Pace Racing	Lola T900	Cosworth DFX V8t														PHX; 15	MIA; 16			20th	16	
1986	March Engineering	March 86C	Buick 3300 V6t	PHX	LBH	INDY; 29	MIL	POR	MEA	CLE	TOR	MCH	POC	MDO	SAN	MCH	ROA	LAG	PHX	MIA	NC	0	
1987	Patrick Racing	March 86C	Buick 3300 V6t	LBH	PHX	INDY; DNQ	MIL	POR	MEA	CLE	TOR	MCH	POC	ROA	MDO	NAZ	LAG	MIA			NA	-	
1988	King Racing	Lola T87/00	Buick 3300 V6t	PHX	LBH	INDY; 6	MIL	POR	CLE	TOR	MEA	MCH	POC	MDO	ROA	NAZ	LAG	MIA			27th	8	
1989	King Racing	Lola T87/00	Buick 3300 V6t	PHX	LBH	INDY; 19	MIL	DET	POR	CLE	MEA	TOR	MCH	POC	MDO	ROA	NAZ	LAG			47th	0	
1990	Team Menard	Lola T89/00	Buick 3300 V6t	PHX; 19	LBH	INDY; 15	MIL	DET	POR	CLE	MEA	TOR	MCH	DEN	VAN	MDO	ROA	NAZ	LAG		36th	0	
1991	King Racing	Lola T91/00	Buick 3300 V6t	SRF	LBH	PHX	INDY; 26	MIL	DET	POR	CLE	MEA	TOR	MCH	DEN	VAN	MDO	ROA	NAZ	LAG	50th	0	
1992	King Racing	Lola T92/00	Buick 3300 V6t	SRF	PHX	LBH	INDY; 25	DET	POR	MIL	NHA	TOR	MCH	CLE	ROA	VAN	MDO	NAZ	LAG		56th	0	
1993	King Racing	Lola T93/00	Chevrolet 265C V8t	SRF	PHX	LBH	INDY; 24	MIL	DET	POR	CLE	TOR	MCH	NHA	ROA	VAN	MDO	NAZ	LAG		49th	0	
1994	Riley & Scott	Lola T91/00	Buick 3300 V6t	SRF	PHX	LBH	INDY; DNQ	MIL	DET	POR	CLE	TOR	MCH	MDO	NHA	VAN	ROA	NAZ	LAG		NA	-	
1995	Hemelgarn Racing	Lola T92/00	Buick 3300 V6t	MIA	SRF	PHX	LBH	NAZ	INDY; DNQ	MIL	DET	POR	ROA	TOR	CLE	MCH	MDO	NHA	VAN	LAG	NA	-	

===== Indianapolis 500 =====
Year	Chassis	Engine	Start	Finish	Team
1984	Theodore 83	Ford Cosworth DFX	DNQ		Ed Wachs Motor Sports
1985	Lola T900	Ford Cosworth DFX	27	16	Wysard Racing
1986	March 86C	Buick	26	29	March Engineering
1987	March 86C	Buick	DNQ		Patrick Racing
1988	Lola T87/00	Buick	18	6	King Racing
1989	Lola T87/00	Buick	4	19	King Racing
1990	Lola T89/00	Buick	29	15	Team Menard
1991	Lola T91/00	Buick	8	26	King Racing
1992	Lola T92/00	Buick	21	25	King Racing
1993	Lola T93/00	Chevrolet 265C	31	24	King Racing
1994	Lola T91/00	Buick	DNQ		Riley & Scott
1995	Lola T92/00	Buick	DNQ		Hemelgarn Racing

Sporting positions
Preceded by Emilio de Villota (1980)	British Formula One Champion; 1982	Succeeded by none
