= Grand Prix Masters =

Motor racing series with retired F1 drivers

- The Grand Prix Masters logo.
- Category: Single seaters
- Country: International
- Inaugural season: 2005
- Folded: 2006
- Drivers: 18
- Engine suppliers: Cosworth
- Last Drivers' champion: (United States) Eddie Cheever
- Last Constructors' champion: (United States) Team GPM

Grand Prix Masters was a one-make motor racing series featuring retired Formula One drivers. The inaugural (and sole 2005) event, at the Kyalami Grand Prix Circuit in South Africa, took place on 11–13 November, but the series folded after a two-race season in 2006.

== Concept ==
Grand Prix Masters was modeled on the lucrative seniors tours of golf and tennis. In order to compete, drivers must:

- Have retired from all forms of open wheel racing
- Have competed in (and retired from) F1 for two complete seasons
- Have passed a medical examination
- Be more than 45 years old (lowered to 40 for 2006) on 1 January for the season to follow

== Car ==
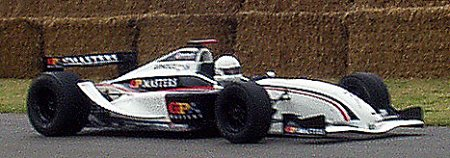
2005 GP Masters Car

All participants raced identical open wheel cars, which are based on the 2000 Reynard 2KI. The chassis was built by English constructor Delta Motorsport, and was powered by a naturally aspirated, 3.5-litre, 80-degree V8 engine produced by Nicholson McLaren. The engine was based on the Cosworth XB engines previously used in Indy car racing, and according to the series' organisers, it produced more than 650 bhp at 10,400 rpm with over 320 lb⋅ft (434 N⋅m) torque at 7,800 rpm.

In 2007 cars were to have been powered by a Mecachrome 90-degree V8 4.0 litre. It developed 600 bhp (450 kW) and revved to in excess of 9500 rpm.

Gearbox operation was controlled by a contemporary paddle shift arrangement.

Grand Prix Masters promoters boasted that the 650 kg (1433 lb.) cars reach 200 mph (320 km/h). Claiming that the combination of stable aerodynamics and considerably simpler technology (than in use in modern Formula One) better demonstrate driver skill and promoted overtaking, electronic "drivers' aids" (such as traction control, power steering and ABS) were absent, and brakes were made of steel rather than carbon (as in many contemporary single seater race cars) to increase braking distances.

== On track ==
The Grand Prix Masters car first ran in late-September 2005 in the hands of Delta Motorsport Operations Director Simon Dowson. He reported a successful shakedown, despite appearing to sit very high in the car, his helmet appearing to sit level with the top of the roll-over hoop.

In mid-October 2005, Nigel Mansell and René Arnoux tested the car at the Pembrey Circuit in South Wales. 26 October saw the first multi-car test for the series, with Mansell, Andrea de Cesaris, Stefan Johansson, Derek Warwick, Alex Caffi, Hans-Joachim Stuck, Patrick Tambay and Christian Danner running at the Silverstone Circuit in England. De Cesaris was fastest, Danner slowest whilst Tambay crashed.

== Controversy ==
There were questions surrounding the fitness of the former Formula One stars who ended up competing in the series. Participant Christian Danner questioned the ability of 1980 World Champion Alan Jones and former GP winner Patrick Tambay in particular, given the rapid expansion of these drivers' waistlines since retiring from racing. Jones hit back claiming the only time Danner had seen a Grand Prix podium was when he passed it on the way to the lavatory. Jones' lack of fitness at the first GP Masters event might suggest Danner's assessment had some merit.

== Seasons ==
=== 2005 ===
The first event, and the only event of the 2005 season, took place at Kyalami in South Africa on 13 November 2005. Nigel Mansell took pole then won after battling hard with Emerson Fittipaldi. Riccardo Patrese was third. Andrea de Cesaris finished fourth after a storming drive, where he pushed past Derek Warwick. Stefan Johansson spun out early on. Jacques Laffite retired with damaged right-front suspension after colliding with René Arnoux. As predicted, Alan Jones proved a disappointment. In practice he was up to ten seconds off the pace of Mansell, before pulling out of the race –- ostensibly due to neck injury. He was replaced by Eliseo Salazar.

==== 2005 results ====
Kyalami (South Africa), November 13

Pos	No	Driver	Team	Time	Gap
1	5	(United Kingdom) Nigel Mansell	Team Altech	50:55.154	
2	7	(Brazil) Emerson Fittipaldi	Team LG	50:55.562	+ 0.408
3	6	(Italy) Riccardo Patrese	Team Goldpfeil	51:15.816	+ 20.662
4	22	(Italy) Andrea de Cesaris	Team Unipart	51:16.854	+ 21.700
5	12	(United Kingdom) Derek Warwick	Team Lixxus	51:17.007	+ 21.853
6	14	(Germany) Hans-Joachim Stuck	Team Phantom	51:18.355	+ 23.201
7	11	(Germany) Christian Danner	Team Unipart	51:19.272	+ 24.118
8	17	(United States) Eddie Cheever	Team Altech	51:27.359	+ 32.205
9	9	(Netherlands) Jan Lammers	Team LG	51:27.932	+ 32.778
10	8	(Chile) Eliseo Salazar	Team Golden Palace	51:38.573	+ 43.419
11	25	(France) Patrick Tambay	Team Lixxus	52:06.738	+ 1'11.584
12	28	(France) René Arnoux	Team Golden Palace	52:07.890	+ 1'12.736
Ret	26	(France) Jacques Laffite	Team GMF	43:44.471	17 laps
Ret	2	(Sweden) Stefan Johansson	Team Phantom	3:33.040	28 laps

=== 2006 ===
In January 2006 GP Masters announced it would hold events in the following venues:

- Losail International Circuit (Qatar), April 29
- Autodromo Nazionale Monza (Italy), June 18 (cancelled)
- Silverstone Circuit (United Kingdom), August 13
- Sepang Circuit (Malaysia), October 15 (cancelled)
- Kyalami (South Africa), November 12 (cancelled)

The race scheduled for Monza was cancelled due to noise limits. The Kyalami event would later be cancelled as well. A race at Sepang was a later addition to the calendar, but was also cancelled in the end.

==== 2006 results ====
Losail International Circuit (Qatar), April 29

Pos	No	Driver	Team	Time	Gap
1	5	(United Kingdom) Nigel Mansell	Team Altech	52:06.000	
2	11	(Germany) Christian Danner	Team LUK	52:06.562	+ 0.562
3	35	(Belgium) Eric van de Poele	Team Golden Palace	52:07.174	+ 1.174
4	17	(United States) Eddie Cheever	Team Altech	52:09.016	+ 3.016
5	12	(United Kingdom) Derek Warwick	Team Lixxus	52:09.420	+ 3.420
6	23	(Italy) Pierluigi Martini	Team Global Logistics	52:11.710	+ 5.710
7	9	(Netherlands) Jan Lammers	Team LG	52:13.044	+ 7.044
8	2	(Sweden) Stefan Johansson	Team Altech	52:14.339	+ 8.339
9	4	(France) René Arnoux	Team Golden Palace	52:15.068	+ 9.068
10	6	(Italy) Riccardo Patrese	Team INA	52:15.423	+ 9.423
11	27	(France) Patrick Tambay	Team Lixxus	52:21.506	+ 15.506
12	7	(Brazil) Emerson Fittipaldi	Team LG	52:35.788	+ 29.788
Ret	10	(Italy) Andrea de Cesaris	Team INA	33:29.621	8 laps
Ret	8	(Chile) Eliseo Salazar	Team Phantom	52:22.127	11 laps
Ret	14	(Germany) Hans-Joachim Stuck	Team Phantom	9:28.882	19 laps

Eddie Cheever won the 2006 race at Silverstone.

Silverstone Circuit (United Kingdom), August 13

Pos	No	Driver	Team	Time	Gap
1	17	(United States) Eddie Cheever	Team GPM	1:01:06.625	
2	35	(Belgium) Eric van de Poele	Team Golden Palace	1:01:25.302	+ 16.677
3	11	(Germany) Christian Danner	Team LUK	1:01:45.180	+ 36.555
4	14	(Germany) Hans-Joachim Stuck	Team Phantom	1:02:02.139	+ 53.514
5	15	(Italy) Alex Caffi	Team Altech	1:02:11.648	+ 1:03.623
6	6	(Italy) Riccardo Patrese	Team INA	1:02:15.492	+ 1:06.867
7	23	(Italy) Pierluigi Martini	Team Motorola	1:02:54.980	+ 1:46.355
8	7	(Brazil) Emerson Fittipaldi	Team LG	1:01:13.217	+ 1 Lap
9	4	(France) René Arnoux	Team Golden Palace	1:01:55.250	+ 2 Laps
10	10	(Italy) Andrea de Cesaris	Team INA	1:01:34.298	+ 2 Laps
11	27	(France) Patrick Tambay	Team Lixxus	1:01:49.162	+ 3 Laps
12	2	(Sweden) Stefan Johansson	Team Virgin Radio	55:22.246	+ 4 Laps
Ret	9	(Netherlands) Jan Lammers	Team LG	34:44.025	13 laps
Ret	8	(Chile) Eliseo Salazar	Team Phantom	19:30.140	20 laps
Ret	12	(United Kingdom) Derek Warwick	Team Lixxus	5:39.035	26 laps
Ret	5	(United Kingdom) Nigel Mansell	Team Altech	31:44.608	26 Laps

=== 2007 (cancelled) ===
Three races would be held in 2007, all cancelled due to organiser bankruptcy (see below section):

- Bucharest Ring (Romania), May 20
- Kyalami (South Africa), September 23
- Losail International Circuit (Qatar), November 17

== Bankruptcy ==
On 18 September 2007, Delta Motorsport, supplier of the GP Masters chassis, announced they were filing a petition with the British High Court to have the GP Masters Operating company placed in liquidation due to non-payment of invoices. Following a hearing on 28 November 2007, the Grand Prix Masters series was officially wound up.

In the first quarter of 2008 Delta Motorsport stated that they intend to re-launch the series under the name F1 Masters using the original car that they manufactured for the GP Masters series.

== Driver statistics ==
Driver	Age in 2005/2006	GP starts	GPM starts	GPM wins	GPM pole positions	GPM fastest laps	Podiums
(United Kingdom) Nigel Mansell	52	187	3	2	2	1	2
(Brazil) Emerson Fittipaldi	61	149	3	0	0	0	1
(Italy) Riccardo Patrese	53	256	3	0	0	0	1
(Italy) Andrea de Cesaris	48	214	3	0	0	0	0
(United Kingdom) Derek Warwick	53	147	3	0	0	0	0
(Germany) Hans-Joachim Stuck	57	93	3	0	0	0	0
(Germany) Christian Danner	49	47	3	0	1	1	2
(United States) Eddie Cheever	49	143	3	1	0	0	1
(Netherlands) Jan Lammers	51	41	3	0	0	0	0
(Chile) Eliseo Salazar	53	37	3	0	0	0	0
(France) Patrick Tambay	58	123	3	0	0	0	0
(France) René Arnoux	59	165	3	0	0	0	0
(Sweden) Stefan Johansson	51	103	3	0	0	0	0
(Belgium) Eric van de Poele	46	29	2	0	0	0	2
(Italy) Pierluigi Martini	46	124	2	0	0	1	0
(Italy) Alex Caffi	43	75	1	0	0	0	0
(France) Jacques Laffite	64	180	1	0	0	0	0
(Australia) Alan Jones	61	117	0	0	0	0	0

== See also ==
- Superstar Racing Experience, another series with similar concept
