= Tony Trimmer =

British racing driver (born 1943)

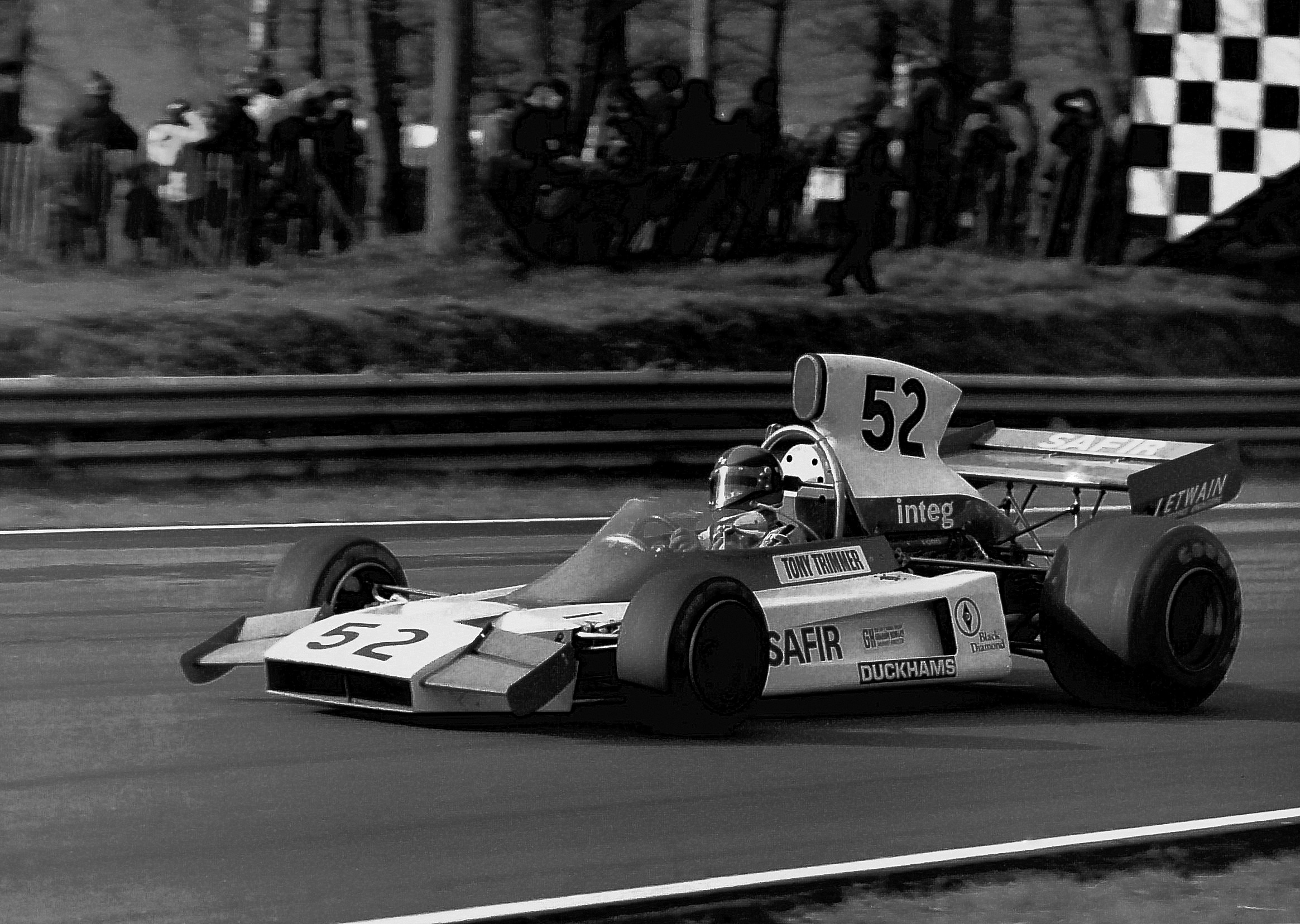
- Trimmer at the 1975 Race of Champions
- Born: 24 January 1943 (age 83); Maidenhead, Berkshire, England, UK

Formula One World Championship career
- Nationality: (United Kingdom) British
- Active years: 1975–1978
- Team(s): Maki; Surtees (privateer); McLaren (privateer)
- Entries: 6 (0 starts)
- Championships: 0
- Wins: 0
- Podiums: 0
- Career points: 0
- Pole positions: 0
- Fastest laps: 0
- First entry: 1975 German Grand Prix
- Last entry: 1978 British Grand Prix

British Formula One Championship career
- Active years: 1978, 1980, 1982
- Entries: 17
- Championships: 1
- Wins: 6
- Podiums: 10
- Career points: 165
- Pole positions: 5
- Fastest laps: 2

Anthony Hugh Leigh Trimmer (born 24 January 1943) is a British former racing driver from England, who won the Shell British Formula Three Championship and E.R. Hall Trophy in 1970.

== Career ==
Trimmer was born in Maidenhead, Berkshire. He won the prestigious Monaco F3 Race in 1970 driving a Brabham BT-28 and finished runner-up to Patrick Depailler in the 1972 edition.

Trimmer entered six Formula One World Championship Grands Prix with uncompetitive teams, firstly Maki for four races in 1975 and 1976, resulting in four failures to qualify. He then entered the 1977 British Grand Prix (failed to pre-qualify) and the 1978 British Grand Prix (failed to qualify), with the Melchester Racing Team, driving a Surtees TS19 and a McLaren M23 respectively. However, also driving the Melchester McLaren, he finished a superb third in the rain-soaked 1978 BRDC International Trophy non-Championship race at Silverstone, coming home ahead of many of the greats of Formula One. That year, he won the British Aurora F1 Championship.

Trimmer was also one of the few people to drive the Connew Formula One car, in its last race (in later Formula 5000 specification) in 1973. However, the car collided with a barrier at Brands Hatch after a rear damper gave way.

== Racing record ==
=== Complete Formula One World Championship results ===
(key) (Races in bold indicate pole position; races in italics indicate fastest lap)

Year	Entrant	Chassis	Engine	1	2	3	4	5	6	7	8	9	10	11	12	13	14	15	16	17	WDC	Pts
1975	Maki Engineering	Maki F101C	Ford Cosworth DFV 3.0 V8	ARG	BRA	RSA	ESP	MON	BEL	SWE	NED	FRA	GBR	GER; DNQ	AUT; DNQ	ITA; DNQ	USA				NC	0
1976	Maki Engineering	Maki F102A	Ford Cosworth DFV 3.0 V8	BRA	RSA	USW	ESP	BEL	MON	SWE	FRA	GBR	GER	AUT	NED	ITA	CAN	USA	JPN; DNQ		NC	0
1977	Melchester Racing	Surtees TS19	Ford Cosworth DFV 3.0 V8	ARG	BRA	RSA	USW	ESP	MON	BEL	SWE	FRA	GBR; DNPQ	GER	AUT	NED	ITA	USA	CAN	JPN	NC	0
1978	Melchester Racing	McLaren M23	Ford Cosworth DFV 3.0 V8	ARG	BRA	RSA	USW	MON	BEL	ESP	SWE	FRA	GBR; DNQ	GER	AUT	NED	ITA	USA	CAN		NC	0

=== Non-Championship results ===
(key) (Races in bold indicate pole position; races in italics indicate fastest lap)

Year	Entrant	Chassis	Engine	1	2	3	4	5	6	7	8
1971	Gold Leaf Team Lotus	Lotus 72C	Ford Cosworth DFV 3.0 V8	ARG	ROC; Ret	QUE			RIN; DNS		
1971	Gold Leaf Team Lotus	Lotus 49C	Ford Cosworth DFV 3.0 V8				SPR; NC	INT			
1971	Frank Williams Racing Cars	March 701	Ford Cosworth DFV 3.0 V8							OUL; Ret	VIC
1973	Frank Williams Racing Cars	Iso-Marlboro FX3	Ford Cosworth DFV 3.0 V8	ROC; 4	INT						
1975	Safir Engineering	Safir RJ02	Ford Cosworth DFV 3.0 V8	ROC; NC	INT; 14						
1975	Maki Engineering	Maki F101C	Ford Cosworth DFV 3.0 V8			SUI; 13					
1977	Melchester Racing	Surtees TS19	Ford Cosworth DFV 3.0 V8	ROC; 9							
1978	Melchester Racing	McLaren M23	Ford Cosworth DFV 3.0 V8	INT; 3							

=== Complete British Formula One Championship results ===
(key) (Races in bold indicate pole position; races in italics indicate fastest lap.)

Year	Entrant	Chassis	Engine	1	2	3	4	5	6	7	8	9	10	11	12	13	14	15	16	17	18	Pos.	Pts
1971	Kaye Griffiths	Surtees TS5A	Chevrolet 5.0 V8	MAL	SNE	BRH	MON	SIL	CAS	MAL	MNZ	MAL; 9	THR; 8	SIL	OUL	SNE; 4	HOC; 7					16th	4
1971	R Plumridge	Lola T190	Chevrolet 5.0 V8															OUL; 7	BRH; 9	BRH		16th	4
1973	ShellSPORT Luxembourg	Lola T330	Chevrolet 5.0 V8	BRH	MAL; DNS	SIL	SNE															24th	5
1973	Tony Trimmer	McLaren M18	Chevrolet 5.0 V8					BRH; 11	OUL; 7	MAL	MIS; C	MAL; 10	MON	SIL	BRH; NC	OUL; DNS	JYL	ZAN	SNE			24th	5
1973	Portobello Inn Racing	Connew PC1	Chevrolet 5.0 V8																	BRH; Ret		24th	5
1974	Tony Kitchiner	McLaren M19A	Chevrolet 5.0 V8	BRH	MAL	SIL	OUL	BRH	ZOL	THR	ZAN	MUG; Ret	MNZ; NC	MAL	MON							30th	1
1974	ShellSPORT Luxembourg	Lola T330	Chevrolet 5.0 V8													THR; 10	BRH	OUL	SNE	MAL	BRH	30th	1
1976	Melchester Racing	Lola T460	Ford BDA Swindon 1.6 L4	MAL	SNE	OUL	BRH	THR	BRH	MAL	SNE	BRH; 20	THR	OUL	BRH	BRH						NC	0
1977	Melchester Racing	Surtees TS19	Ford Cosworth DFV 3.0 V8	**MAL**; 3	SNE; 5	OUL; Ret	BRH; Ret	**MAL**; 1	THR; Ret	BRH; 1	**OUL**; 1	MAL; 2	**DON**; 1	**BRH**; 2	THR; Ret	SNE; 1	**BRH**; 2					1st	181
1978	Melchester Racing	McLaren M23	Ford Cosworth DFV 3.0 V8	**OUL**; 1	BRH; 1	**SNE**; 1	**MAL**; 2	ZAN; DNS	DON	THR; 1	OUL	**MAL**; 2	BRH; 1	THR	SNE; 2							1st	149
1980	Jordan BRM	BRM P207	BRM P202 3.0 V12	OUL	BRH	SIL	MAL; Ret	THR; DNS	MNZ	MAL	SNE; Ret	BRH; Ret	THR; Ret	OUL	SIL							NC	0
1982	Team Sanada	Fittipaldi F8	Ford Cosworth DFV 3.0 V8	OUL; 1	**BRH**; 2	THR; Ret	DON	BRH														2nd	16

=== Complete European Formula Two Championship results ===
(key)

Year	Entrant	Chassis	Engine	1	2	3	4	5	6	7	8	9	10	11	12	Pos.	Pts
1978	Boxer Cars	Boxer PR276	Hart	THR	HOC	NÜR	PAU	MUG	VAL	ROU	DON; DNQ	NOG	PER	MIS	HOC	NC	0

=== Complete 24 Hours of Le Mans results ===
Year	Team	Co-Drivers	Car	Class	Laps	Pos.	Class Pos.
1979	(Japan) Dome Co. Ltd.	(United Kingdom) Bob Evans	Dome Zero RL-Ford Cosworth	S+2.0	25	DNF	DNF
1980	(United Kingdom) Ian Bracey	(United Kingdom) Tiff Needell	Ibec P6-Ford Cosworth	S+2.0	-	DNQ	DNQ
1981	(United Kingdom) Ian Bracey	(United Kingdom) Tiff Needell	Ibec-Hesketh 308LM-Ford Cosworth	S+2.0	95	DNF	DNF

=== Complete World Endurance Championship results ===
(key) (Races in bold indicate pole position) (Races in italics indicate fastest lap)

Year	Entrant	Class	Chassis	Engine	1	2	3	4	5	6	7	8	9	10	11	12	13	14	15	Pos.	Pts
1980	Ian Bracey	S +2.0	Ibec P6	Ford Cosworth DFV 3.0 V8	DAY	BRH	MUG	MNZ	SIL; DNS	NÜR	LMS; DNQ	GLN	MOS	VAL	DIJ					(Note: No drivers' Championship.)	
1981	Ian Bracey	S +2.0	Ibec-Hesketh 308LM	Ford Cosworth DFV 3.0 V8	DAY	SEB	MUG	MNZ	RSD	SIL	NÜR	LMS; Ret	PER	DAY	GLN	SPA	MOS	ROA	BRH	NC	0

Footnotes

=== Complete European Touring Car Championship results ===
(key) (Races in bold indicate pole position) (Races in italics indicate fastest lap)

Year	Team	Car	1	2	3	4	5	6	7	8	9	10	11	12	13	14	DC	Points
1985	Andy Rouse Engineering	Ford Sierra XR4Ti	MNZ	VAL	DON	AND	BRN	ZEL	SAL	NUR	SPA	SIL; Ret	NOG	ZOL	EST	JAR	NC	0

Sporting positions
Preceded by Emerson Fittipaldi (Combined championship)	British Formula 3 Championship; BRSCC Motorsport/Shell Series Champion; 1970	Succeeded by Dave Walker
Preceded by David Purley	Shellsport International Series; Champion; 1977	Succeeded by None (Series ended)
Preceded by Inaugural	British Formula One Champion; 1978	Succeeded by Rupert Keegan
