= Monte Carlo Automobile =

Monaco-based car manufacturer

Monte-Carlo Automobiles S.A.R.L.
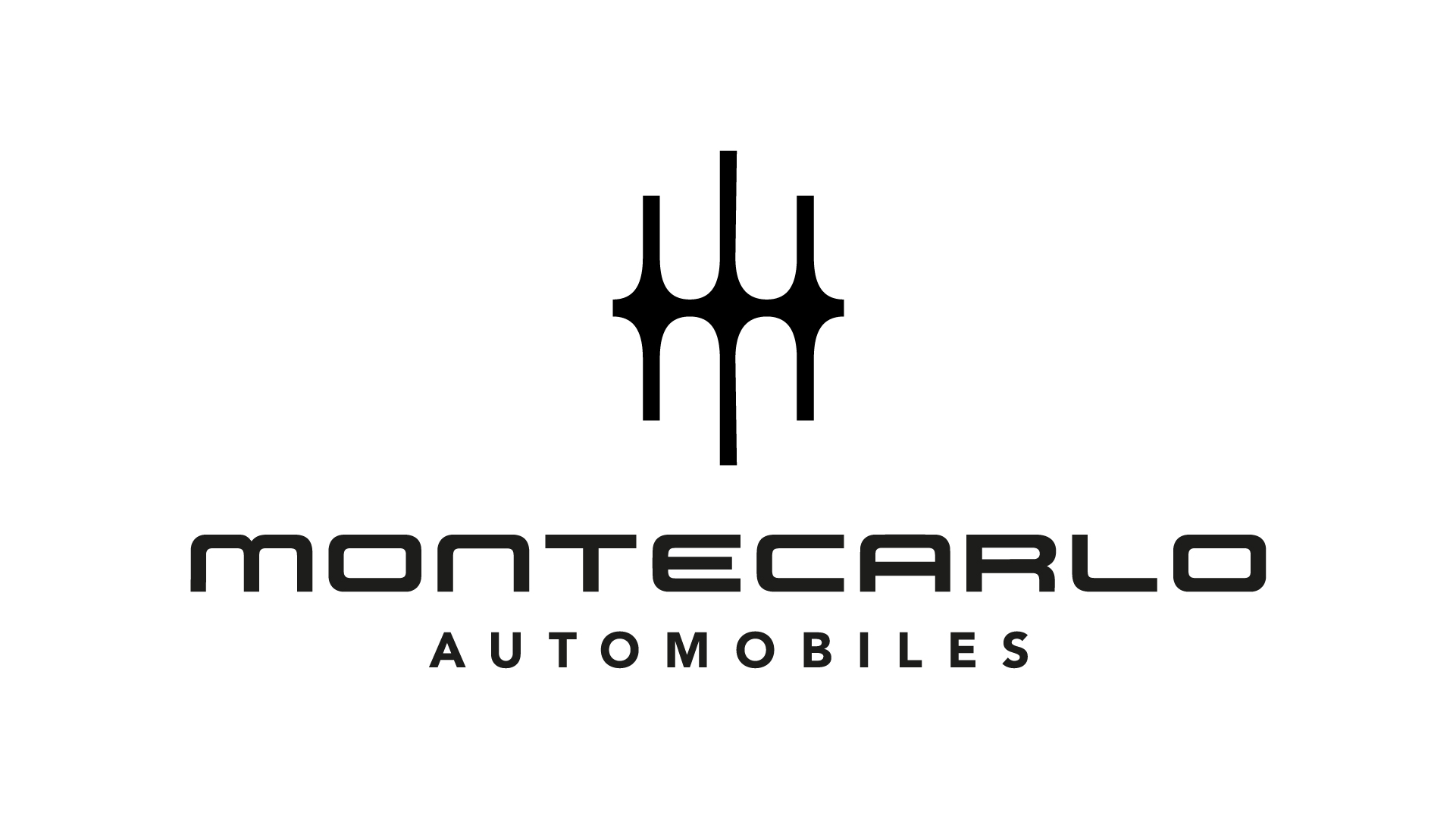
- Industry: Automotive
- Founded: 1983
- Founder: Fulvio Maria Ballabio
- Headquarters: Principality of Monaco
- Website: mca.mc

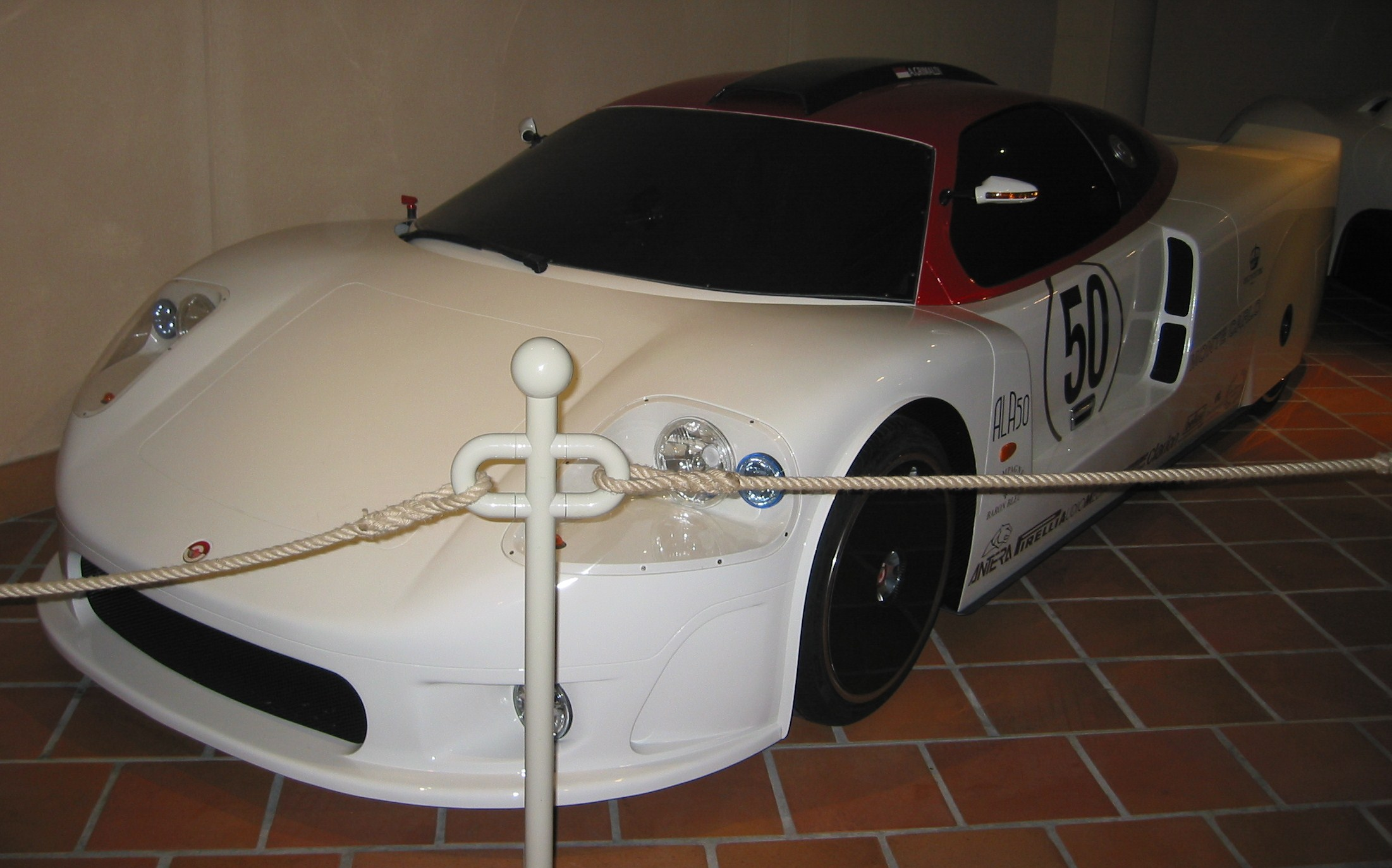
Monte Carlo ALA 50 powered by 650 hp V8 engine

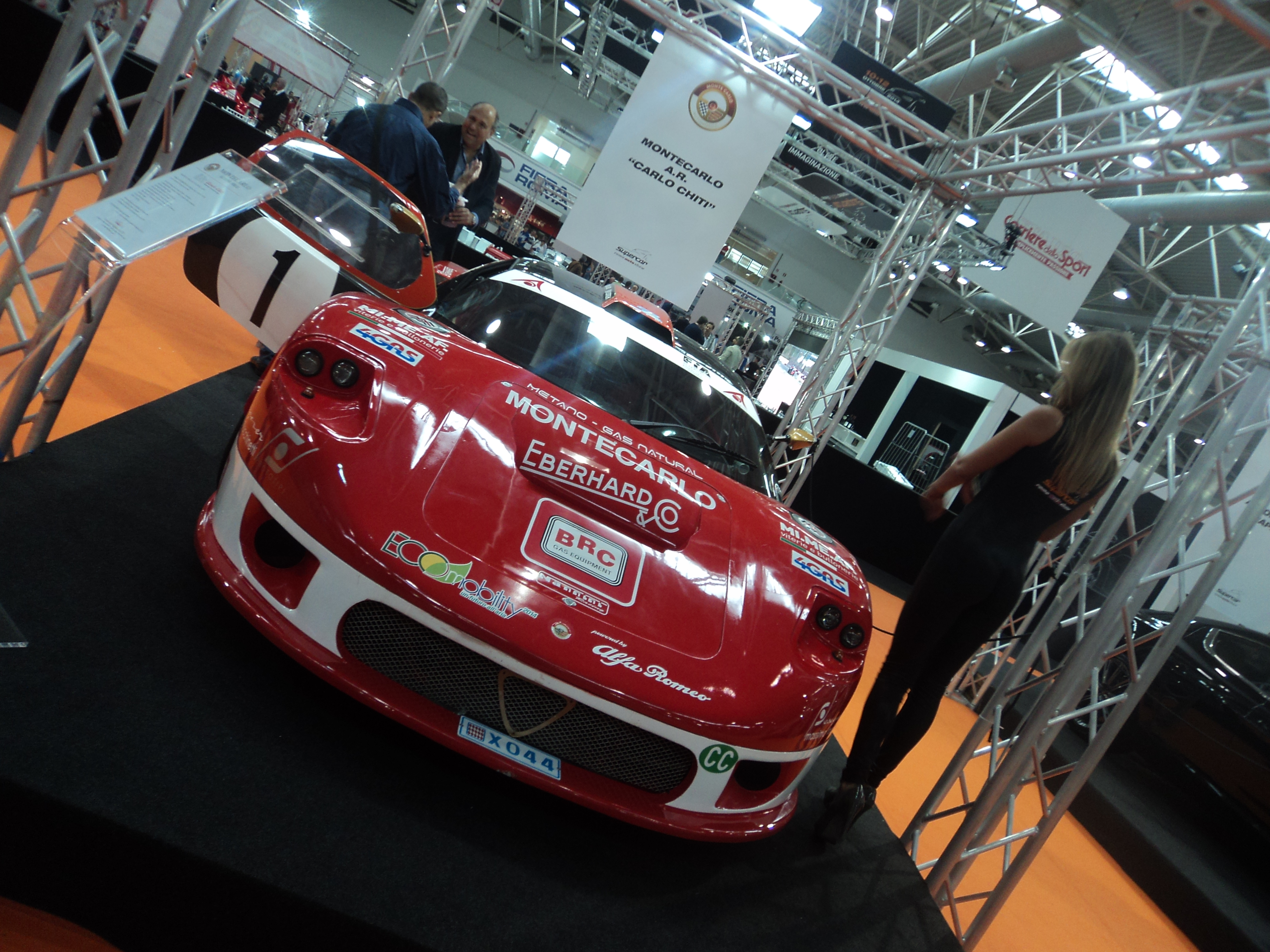
Carlo Chiti MonzaCodaLunga, a GT racing car with an Alfa Romeo V6 3.0L engine fueled by methane

Monte-Carlo Automobiles S.A.R.L. (MCA) is a car manufacturer based in Monte Carlo, Monaco. The company specializes in manufacturing sports cars. The company was founded in 1983 by engineer Fulvio Maria Ballabio, a former Formula Two, IndyCar Series and Offshore racer.

== History ==
Monte-Carlo Automobiles began manufacturing its first street-legal GT car in 1989, the Centenaire. Powered by a Lamborghini V-12 engine, the name is a celebration of the hundredth anniversary of the Automobile Club de Monaco (founded in 1890). Five examples were produced. The MCA Centenaire V12 won its class in the 1993 6 Hours of Vallelunga. Monte-Carlo Automobiles was acquired in 1995 by the French Aixam Mega group. Aixam later returned the company ownership back to their founders.

Monte-Carlo Automobiles started a collaboration with FIA, Automobile Club d'Italia (ACI) and Commissione Sportiva Automobilistica Italiana in 2005 to produce the Carlo Chiti Stradale 90, which was powered by non-petrol sources. Its design was derived from two cars: the ALA 50 powered by methane and liquefied petroleum gas and the Quadrifuel Carlo Chiti powered by an engine derived from the Alfa Romeo 8C coupe combined with an electric motor fitted to the front axle using methane, ethanol, liquefied petroleum gas and gasoline.

On 25 March 2012, Monte-Carlo Automobiles released a new car named Monte Carlo/BRC W12 in collaboration with BRC Racing Team. It competed in the 4 Hours of Monza, finishing in eighth place. In 2014, the company unveiled a sports car called the Montecarlo Automobiles Rascasse equipped with a mid-mounted, BMW-sourced 5.4-liter V12 engine.
