= 1981 United States Grand Prix West =

- Race 1 of 15 in the 1981 Formula One World Championship
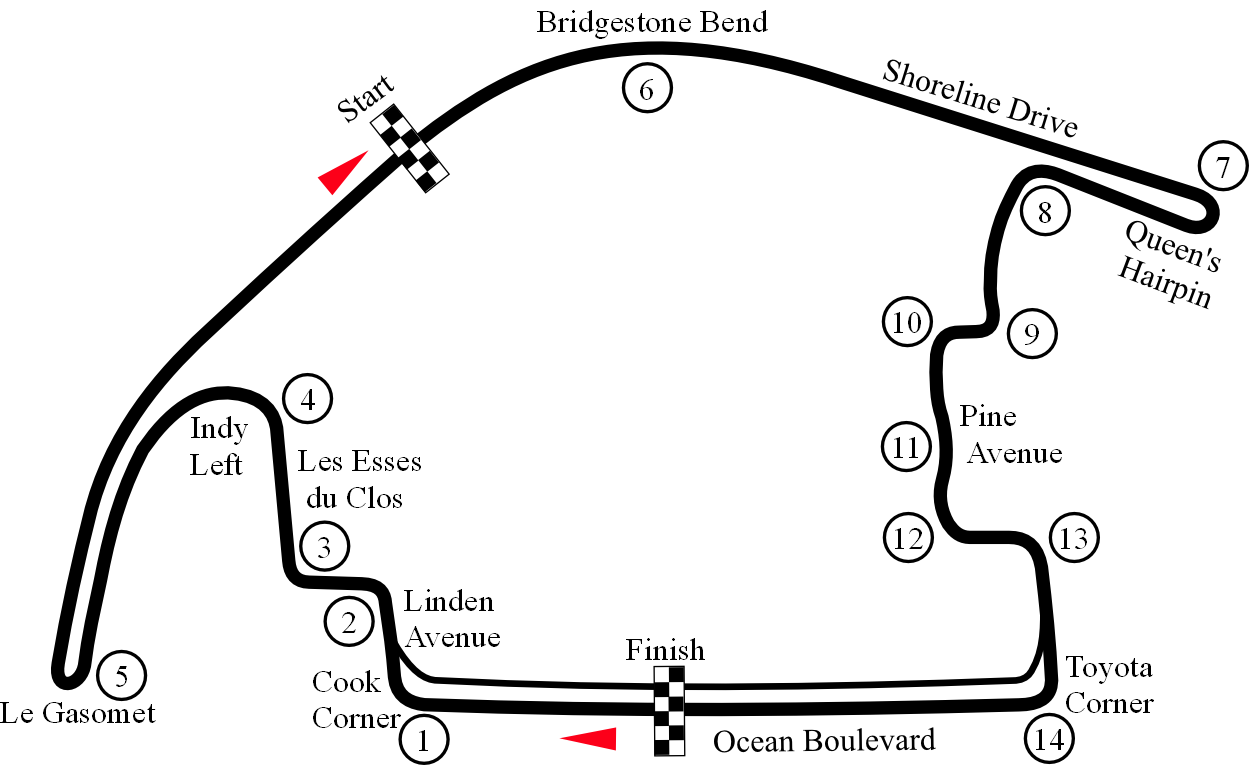

Race details
- Date: March 15, 1981
- Official name: Toyota Grand Prix of Long Beach
- Location: Long Beach Street Circuit
- Course: Temporary street course
- Course length: 3.251 km (2.02 miles)
- Distance: 80 laps, 260.08 km (161.60 miles)
- Weather: Sunny and warm with temperatures reaching up to 71.1 °F (21.7 °C); wind speeds approaching 10.9 miles per hour (17.5 km/h)

Pole position
Driver	(Italy) Riccardo Patrese	Arrows-Ford
- Time: 1:19.399

Fastest lap
Driver	(Australia) Alan Jones	Williams-Ford
- Time: 1:20.901 on lap 31

Podium
First	(Australia) Alan Jones	Williams-Ford
Second	(Argentina) Carlos Reutemann	Williams-Ford
Third	(Brazil) Nelson Piquet	Brabham-Ford

The 1981 United States Grand Prix West (officially the Toyota Grand Prix of Long Beach) was a Formula One motor race held on March 15, 1981, at Long Beach Street Circuit. It was the opening race of the 1981 Formula One World Championship.

== Summary ==
Defending World Champion Alan Jones finished nine seconds ahead of teammate Carlos Reutemann, and won his first Long Beach Grand Prix, as the 1981 season finally began after a winter of controversy and legal battles. It was the third consecutive Grand Prix win for Jones, and his second consecutive in the United States, after seizing the 1980 Drivers' title with season-ending wins in Montreal, Canada and Watkins Glen, New York.

The off-season had seen FISA (La Fédération Internationale du Sport Automobile) and FOCA (the Formula One Constructors' Association) in conflict, ostensibly over FISA's scheduled ban of aerodynamic skirts on the cars, but also over financial control of the sport. After threatening to institute their own championship, FOCA agreed to the skirt ban on assurance of their continued control of the sport's finances and FISA's commitment to a four-year period of stability in the rules. Just 10 days prior to the season-opening race in Long Beach, the Concorde Agreement was signed in Paris, allowing all of the teams to appear.

In the meantime, the South African race, run in February under FOCA's pre-agreement version of the rules, had been deprived of its World Championship status by the dispute, and the Argentine race, originally scheduled in January, was moved to April.

In addition to the new rules, Goodyear announced in December that it intended to withdraw immediately from all involvement in European racing. So, when the teams arrived in Long Beach for the first Championship race of the season, the Friday morning practice sessions were filled with frantic activity. Larger wings, softer springs and revised sidepods were in evidence for nearly everyone, trying to make up for the absence of the banned skirts. With all teams also using Michelin tires as well, many drivers were struggling to come to grips with a totally new set of challenges.

When the teams arrived in the Los Angeles area town of Long Beach, the demanding and tight street circuit had been slightly modified from the year before- the second left-hander on Pine Avenue had been made a single-apex corner instead of a double-apex.

On Saturday, yet another legal issue arose over the new twin-chassis Lotus 88, designed by Colin Chapman and Martin Ogilvie. A protest was lodged by a majority of the teams, although they did not specify what rules it was breaking. The car was initially approved by the FISA technical staff and passed by the scrutineers, allowing it to take part in Friday practice. Ultimately, however, the teams' appeal was allowed, the car was banned from the rest of the weekend and Lotus had to qualify and race the more conventional Lotus 81.

On the track, in final qualifying, Riccardo Patrese and Alan Jones traded the top spot back and forth several times during the session. Patrese finally managed to take the pole, clinching his first ever and the first (and only) for his Arrows team, by .01 seconds. Jones's Williams teammate Reutemann was third, followed by Nelson Piquet's Brabham, the Ferrari of Gilles Villeneuve and Mario Andretti in his first race for Alfa Romeo. The all-American Tyrrell driver team had Eddie Cheever in eighth place, but Kevin Cogan missed the final qualifying spot by .07 seconds. It was the first time a Tyrrell had ever failed to make the grid.

Sunday's weather, typical of Long Beach was perfect, but the first lap was not. Villeneuve made a wild charge down the outside off the grid and briefly took the lead, but he left his braking for the Queens Hairpin far too late. As he went wide, Patrese and the Williams pair of Reutemann and Jones all went through. Villeneuve was able to gather it in and rejoin in fourth, but Andrea de Cesaris did not, as he ran his McLaren into the back of both Alain Prost and Héctor Rebaque approaching the hairpin. After being hit, Prost's Renault slid across the track and shoved the Brabham of Rebaque into the wall. Prost and de Cesaris were out on the spot, but Rebaque was able to continue after pitting for four new tires. After one lap, the order was Patrese, Reutemann, Jones, Villeneuve, Piquet, Didier Pironi, Cheever and Andretti.

For the first part of the race, Patrese led Reutemann by around one second with Jones another three seconds behind. Then, almost the length of the pit straight back, was Pironi, who had traded places with Villeneuve (fifth and third) but was now holding up a line of cars as Piquet desperately tried to get by.

Lap 17 was a bad one for Ferrari as Piquet finally passed Pironi for fourth, and Villeneuve retired with a broken driveshaft. On lap 25, Reutemann took the lead from Patrese just a lap before Patrese pitted with a misfiring engine. He rejoined the race with a new spark box, but after two more stops for the same problem, finally retired with a broken fuel pickup.

Patrese's retirement left Reutemann with a three-second lead over teammate Jones, who immediately began closing the gap by half a second per lap. Any questions about team orders letting the number one driver through were soon answered. On lap 32, while lapping Marc Surer's Ensign, Reutemann slid wide in the esses on Pine Avenue, and Jones went through for the lead. Within 12 laps, the defending World Champion had stretched out a lead of ten seconds. At the same time, Reutemann was extending his lead over Piquet to 36 seconds.

On lap 41, Jacques Laffite tried to go by Cheever as they entered the right-hander after the pits. Instead, he ran into the back of the Tyrrell, bending the nose of his Ligier and damaging Cheever's gearbox. Laffite had to limp around the entire course, and as he was finally about to enter the pits, Bruno Giacomelli approached, with Jan Lammers between the two of them. Giacomelli started to pass both cars on the inside, but realized he couldn't when Laffite turned to enter the pit lane. Giacomelli tried to go around Lammers on the other side, but it was too late. He ran over Lammers's ATS, pushing him into the wall.

Laffite's retirement interrupted an extended battle with Pironi, Cheever and Andretti for fourth place. Andretti passed Cheever for fifth on lap 43, then traded fourth several times with Pironi, before finally taking the position for good on lap 54. Pironi's Ferrari had developed a fuel feed problem and Cheever was also able to go by to take fifth. In making the pass, however, he lost his damaged second gear, by far the one most used on the tight street circuit.

The positions remained the same for the last quarter of the race with Jones and Reutemann easing up to take the third consecutive one-two for Williams. Piquet, having lost his shot at the leaders while bottled up behind Pironi, finished third, 35 seconds back. Mario Andretti thrilled the American crowd with his fourth place, just ahead of compatriot Eddie Cheever's Tyrrell in fifth. It was the first time for two Americans to finish in the points since Andretti and Mark Donohue at the 1975 Swedish Grand Prix.

== Classification ==
=== Qualifying ===
Pos	No	Driver	Constructor	Q1	Q2	Gap
1	29	(Italy) Riccardo Patrese	Arrows-Ford	1:21.983	1:19.399	—
2	1	(Australia) Alan Jones	Williams-Ford	1:20.911	1:19.408	+0.009
3	2	(Argentina) Carlos Reutemann	Williams-Ford	1:21.739	1:20.149	+0.750
4	5	(Brazil) Nelson Piquet	Brabham-Ford	1:22.675	1:20.289	+0.890
5	27	(Canada) Gilles Villeneuve	Ferrari	1:21.723	1:20.462	+1.063
6	22	(United States) Mario Andretti	Alfa Romeo	1:22.020	1:20.476	+1.077
7	12	(United Kingdom) Nigel Mansell	Lotus-Ford	1:22.461	1:20.573	+1.174
8	3	(United States) Eddie Cheever	Tyrrell-Ford	1:22.992	1:20.643	+1.244
9	23	(Italy) Bruno Giacomelli	Alfa Romeo	1:22.592	1:20.664	+1.265
10	25	(France) Jean-Pierre Jarier	Ligier-Matra	1:21.722	1:20.787	+1.388
11	28	(France) Didier Pironi	Ferrari	1:21.828	1:20.909	+1.510
12	26	(France) Jacques Laffite	Ligier-Matra	1:23.140	1:20.925	+1.526
13	11	(Italy) Elio de Angelis	Lotus-Ford	1:22.380	1:20.928	+1.529
14	15	(France) Alain Prost	Renault	1:23.049	1:20.980	+1.581
15	6	(Mexico) Héctor Rebaque	Brabham-Ford	1:23.298	1:21.000	+1.601
16	20	(Finland) Keke Rosberg	Fittipaldi-Ford	1:23.356	1:21.001	+1.602
17	33	(France) Patrick Tambay	Theodore-Ford	1:23.373	1:21.298	+1.899
18	21	(Brazil) Chico Serra	Fittipaldi-Ford	1:26.730	1:21.409	+2.010
19	14	(Switzerland) Marc Surer	Ensign-Ford	1:28.045	1:21.522	+2.123
20	16	(France) René Arnoux	Renault	1:23.363	1:21.540	+2.141
21	9	(Netherlands) Jan Lammers	ATS-Ford	1:23.802	1:21.758	+2.359
22	8	(Italy) Andrea de Cesaris	McLaren-Ford	1:23.728	1:22.028	+2.629
23	7	(United Kingdom) John Watson	McLaren-Ford	1:26.419	1:22.183	+2.784
24	32	(Italy) Beppe Gabbiani	Osella-Ford	1:24.032	1:22.213	+2.814
25	4	(United States) Kevin Cogan	Tyrrell-Ford	1:25.164	1:22.284	+2.885
26	17	(Republic of Ireland) Derek Daly	March-Ford	1:25.017	1:22.356	+2.957
27	31	(Argentina) Miguel Angel Guerra	Osella-Ford	1:25.190	1:22.673	+3.274
28	30	(Italy) Siegfried Stohr	Arrows-Ford	1:23.504	no time	+4.105
29	18	(Chile) Eliseo Salazar	March-Ford	1:26.074	1:24.383	+4.984

=== Race ===
Pos	No	Driver	Constructor	Laps	Time/Retired	Grid	Points
1	1	(Australia) Alan Jones	Williams-Ford	80	1:50:41.33	2	9
2	2	(Argentina) Carlos Reutemann	Williams-Ford	80	+ 9.19	3	6
3	5	(Brazil) Nelson Piquet	Brabham-Ford	80	+ 34.92	4	4
4	22	(United States) Mario Andretti	Alfa Romeo	80	+ 49.31	6	3
5	3	(United States) Eddie Cheever	Tyrrell-Ford	80	+ 1:06.70	8	2
6	33	(France) Patrick Tambay	Theodore-Ford	79	+ 1 Lap	17	1
7	21	(Brazil) Chico Serra	Fittipaldi-Ford	78	+ 2 Laps	18	
8	16	(France) René Arnoux	Renault	77	+ 3 Laps	20	
Ret	14	(Switzerland) Marc Surer	Ensign-Ford	70	Fuel System	19	
Ret	28	(France) Didier Pironi	Ferrari	67	Fuel System	11	
Ret	25	(France) Jean-Pierre Jarier	Ligier-Matra	64	Fuel Pump	10	
Ret	6	(Mexico) Héctor Rebaque	Brabham-Ford	49	Accident	15	
Ret	23	(Italy) Bruno Giacomelli	Alfa Romeo	41	Collision	9	
Ret	26	(France) Jacques Laffite	Ligier-Matra	41	Collision	12	
Ret	20	(Finland) Keke Rosberg	Fittipaldi-Ford	41	Engine	16	
Ret	9	(Netherlands) Jan Lammers	ATS-Ford	41	Collision	21	
Ret	29	(Italy) Riccardo Patrese	Arrows-Ford	33	Fuel System	1	
Ret	32	(Italy) Beppe Gabbiani	Osella-Ford	26	Accident	24	
Ret	12	(United Kingdom) Nigel Mansell	Lotus-Ford	25	Accident	7	
Ret	27	(Canada) Gilles Villeneuve	Ferrari	17	Halfshaft	5	
Ret	7	(United Kingdom) John Watson	McLaren-Ford	16	Brakes	23	
Ret	11	(Italy) Elio de Angelis	Lotus-Ford	13	Accident	13	
Ret	15	(France) Alain Prost	Renault	0	Collision	14	
Ret	8	(Italy) Andrea de Cesaris	McLaren-Ford	0	Collision	22	
DNQ	4	(United States) Kevin Cogan	Tyrrell-Ford				
DNQ	17	(Republic of Ireland) Derek Daly	March-Ford				
DNQ	31	(Argentina) Miguel Angel Guerra	Osella-Ford				
DNQ	30	(Italy) Siegfried Stohr	Arrows-Ford				
DNQ	18	(Chile) Eliseo Salazar	March-Ford				

== Notes ==
- This was the Formula One World Championship debut for Brazilian driver Chico Serra, Italian driver Siegfried Stohr, Argentinian driver Miguel Ángel Guerra and Chilean driver Eliseo Salazar - the first Chilean to drive in Formula One.
- This race marked the 25th Grand Prix win for an Australian driver.
- This was the 1st pole position for Arrows.

== Championship standings after the race ==
Drivers' Championship standings

Pos	Driver	Points
1	(Australia) Alan Jones	9
2	(Argentina) Carlos Reutemann	6
3	(Brazil) Nelson Piquet	4
4	(United States) Mario Andretti	3
5	(United States) Eddie Cheever	2

Constructors' Championship standings

Pos	Constructor	Points
1	(United Kingdom) Williams-Ford	15
2	(United Kingdom) Brabham-Ford	4
3	(Italy) Alfa Romeo	3
4	(United Kingdom) Tyrrell-Ford	2
5	(Hong Kong) Theodore-Ford	1

- Note: Only the top five positions are included for both sets of standings.

Preceded by 1980 United States Grand Prix	FIA Formula One World Championship; 1981 season	Succeeded by 1981 Brazilian Grand Prix
Preceded by 1980 United States Grand Prix West	United States Grand Prix West	Succeeded by 1982 United States Grand Prix West
Preceded by 1980 United States Grand Prix West	Grand Prix of Long Beach	Succeeded by 1982 United States Grand Prix West
