= 1980 British Formula One Championship =

UK auto racing competition

Seasons
- ← 1979 1982 →

The 1980 British Formula One Championship (formally the 1980 Aurora AFX F1 Championship) was the third season of the British Formula One Championship. It commenced on 4 April 1980 and ended on 5 October after twelve races. The Drivers' Championship was won by the Spaniard Emilio de Villota who drove a Williams FW07 entered by RAM Racing.

== Teams and drivers ==
Entry List
| Team | No. | Driver | Chassis | Engine | Rounds |
Formula 1
| (United Kingdom) C. W. Clowes Racing | 1 | (United Kingdom) Guy Edwards | Arrows A1 | Ford Cosworth DFV 3.0 V8 | All |
| (United Kingdom) C. W. Clowes Racing | 2 | (Republic of Ireland) Vivian Candy | Arrows A1 | Ford Cosworth DFV 3.0 V8 | 4-5 |
| (United Kingdom) C. W. Clowes Racing | 2 | (Argentina) Leon Walger | Arrows A1 | Ford Cosworth DFV 3.0 V8 | 6-9, 11-12 |
| (United Kingdom) C. W. Clowes Racing | 3 | (Italy) Renzo Zorzi | Arrows A1 | Ford Cosworth DFV 3.0 V8 | 6 |
| (United Kingdom) Theodore Racing | 3 | (South Africa) Desiré Wilson | Wolf WR4 | Ford Cosworth DFV 3.0 V8 | 1-5 |
| (United Kingdom) Theodore Racing | 3 | (South Africa) Desiré Wilson | Wolf WR3 | Ford Cosworth DFV 3.0 V8 | 7 |
| (United Kingdom) Theodore Racing | 4 | (United Kingdom) Geoff Lees | Wolf WR3 | Ford Cosworth DFV 3.0 V8 | 1-2 |
| (United Kingdom) Theodore Racing | 4 | (United States) Kevin Cogan | Wolf WR3 | Ford Cosworth DFV 3.0 V8 | 3-4, 6, 8-9 |
| (United Kingdom) Theodore Racing | 4 | (United States) Kevin Cogan | Wolf WR4 | Ford Cosworth DFV 3.0 V8 | 7 |
| (United Kingdom) Graham Eden Racing | 3 | (United Kingdom) Mike Wilds | Chevron B41 | Ford Cosworth DFV 3.0 V8 | 12 |
| (United Kingdom) RAM Racing | 7 | (Spain) Emilio de Villota | Williams FW07 | Ford Cosworth DFV 3.0 V8 | 1-4, 6-12 |
| (United Kingdom) RAM Racing | 7 | (Spain) Emilio de Villota | Fittipaldi F5A | Ford Cosworth DFV 3.0 V8 | 5 |
| (United Kingdom) RAM Racing | 8 | (Chile) Eliseo Salazar | Williams FW07 | Ford Cosworth DFV 3.0 V8 | 1-6 |
| (United Kingdom) RAM Racing | 8 | (Chile) Eliseo Salazar | Williams FW07B | Ford Cosworth DFV 3.0 V8 | 7-12 |
| (Italy) Team Agostini | 9 | (Italy) Giacomo Agostini | Williams FW06 | Ford Cosworth DFV 3.0 V8 | 2-3, 5-6, 8-10, 12 |
| (Italy) Team Agostini | 22 | (Italy) Gimax | Williams FW06 | Ford Cosworth DFV 3.0 V8 | 5-6 |
| (United Kingdom) Colin Bennett Racing | 10 | (United Kingdom) Norman Dickson | Lotus 78 | Ford Cosworth DFV 3.0 V8 | 1-5 |
| (United Kingdom) Colin Bennett Racing | 10 | (Italy) Gianfranco Brancatelli | Lotus 78 | Ford Cosworth DFV 3.0 V8 | 6 |
| (United Kingdom) Colin Bennett Racing | 10 | (South Africa) Desiré Wilson | Lotus 78 | Ford Cosworth DFV 3.0 V8 | 9 |
| (United Kingdom) Colin Bennett Racing | 10 | (Colombia) Ricardo Londoño | Lotus 78 | Ford Cosworth DFV 3.0 V8 | 12 |
| (United Kingdom) Colin Bennett Racing | 15 | (United Kingdom) Valentino Musetti | Fittipaldi F5A | Ford Cosworth DFV 3.0 V8 | 5-9 |
| (United Kingdom) Colin Bennett Racing | 15 | (United Kingdom) Valentino Musetti | Fittipaldi F5B | Ford Cosworth DFV 3.0 V8 | 10-12 |
| (United Kingdom) Scotcircuits Ltd | 12 | (United Kingdom) Robin Smith | Surtees TS19/TS20S | Ford Cosworth DFV 3.0 V8 | 6-7, 9 |
| (United Kingdom) Scotcircuits Ltd | 12 | (United Kingdom) Richard Jones | Surtees TS19/TS20S | Ford Cosworth DFV 3.0 V8 | 11 |
| (United Kingdom) Cliff Smith Racing | 16 | (United Kingdom) Ray Mallock | Surtees TS20+ | Ford Cosworth DFV 3.0 V8 | 1, 3, 5 |
| (United Kingdom) Cliff Smith Racing | 16 | (United Kingdom) Ray Mallock | Wolf WR6 | Ford Cosworth DFV 3.0 V8 | 9-10, 12 |
| (Italy) Dywa Cars | 21 | (Italy) Piercarlo Ghinzani | Dywa 01 | Ford Cosworth DFV 3.0 V8 | 6 |
| (United Kingdom) Jordan BRM | 30 | (United Kingdom) Tony Trimmer | BRM P207 | BRM P202 3.0 V12 | 4-5, 8-10 |
| (United Kingdom) Dennis Leech | 34 | (United Kingdom) Dennis Leech | McLaren M23 | Ford Cosworth DFV 3.0 V8 | 12 |
Formula 2
| (United Kingdom) Theodore Racing | 11 | (United Kingdom) Kim Mather | March 802 | Hart 420R 2.0 L4 | 1, 3-5, 7-12 |
| (Italy) Sanremo Racing | 11 | (Italy) Alberto Colombo | March 782 | BMW M12 2.0 L4 | 6 |
| (Italy) Sanremo Racing | 17 | (Italy) Guido Daccò | March 792 | BMW M12 2.0 L4 | 6 |
| (Italy) Sanremo Racing | 35 | (Italy) Gianfranco | March 782 | BMW M12 2.0 L4 | 6 |
| (United Kingdom) Divina Galica | 13 | (United Kingdom) Divina Galica | March 792 | Hart 420R 2.0 L4 | 11-12 |
| (United Kingdom) Docking Spitzley Racing | 14 | (United Kingdom) John Lewis | Toleman TG280 | Hart 420R 2.0 L4 | 12 |
| (United Kingdom) A. G. Dean Racing | 18 | (United Kingdom) Tony Dean | Chevron B42 | Hart 420R 2.0 L4 | 1-4 |
| (United Kingdom) Grange Performance Cars | 19 | (United Kingdom) Brian Robinson | Chevron B48 | Hart 420R 2.0 L4 | 1-2, 7-11 |
| (United Kingdom) Grange Performance Cars | 19 | (United Kingdom) Brian Robinson | Chevron B42 | Hart 420R 2.0 L4 | 3-6, 12 |
| (United Kingdom) Bob Howlings Racing Cars | 20 | (United Kingdom) Bob Howlings | Chevron B42 | Hart 420R 2.0 L4 | 1-5, 11-12 |
| (United Kingdom) Roy Baker | 24 | (United Kingdom) Roy Baker | Chevron B48 | Hart 420R 2.0 L4 | 4-12 |
| (United Kingdom) Warren Booth | 29 | (United Kingdom) Warren Booth | Chevron B48 | Hart 420R 2.0 L4 | 1, 3-8, 10-12 |
| (United Kingdom) Harper High Performance Racing | 33 | (United Kingdom) Ron Harper | Chevron B40 | Hart 420R 2.0 L4 | 4, 6, 12 |
| (United Kingdom) BMTR | 35 | (United Kingdom) Paul Smith | March 782 | Hart 420R 2.0 L4 | 7, 9-10, 12 |
| (United Kingdom) Terry Fisher | 35 | (United Kingdom) Terry Fisher | Chevron B42 | Ford BDG 2.0 L4 | 8 |
| (United Kingdom) John Gibson Ltd. | 44 | (United Kingdom) Paul Gibson | March 792 | Hart 420R 2.0 L4 | 5-6 |
| (United Kingdom) Plygrange Racing | 77 | (United Kingdom) Jim Crawford | Chevron B45 | Ford BDX 2.0 L4 | 1, 3-12 |

== Results and standings ==
=== Races ===
| Rnd | Track | Date | Laps | Pole position | Fastest lap | Race winner | Constructor |
|---|---|---|---|---|---|---|---|
| 1 | Oulton Park | 4 April | 65 | (Spain) Emilio de Villota | (Spain) Emilio de Villota | (United Kingdom) Guy Edwards | Arrows |
| 2 | Brands Hatch | 7 April | 40 | (Spain) Emilio de Villota | (South Africa) Desiré Wilson | (South Africa) Desiré Wilson | Wolf |
| 3 | Silverstone | 20 April | 35 | (Chile) Eliseo Salazar | (Chile) Eliseo Salazar | (Chile) Eliseo Salazar | Williams |
| 4 | Mallory Park | 5 May | 75 | (Chile) Eliseo Salazar | (Spain) Emilio de Villota | (Spain) Emilio de Villota | Williams |
| 5 | Thruxton | 26 May | 43 | (Chile) Eliseo Salazar | (South Africa) Desiré Wilson | (Chile) Eliseo Salazar | Williams |
| 6 | Monza | 29 June | 28 | (Spain) Emilio de Villota | (United Kingdom) Guy Edwards | (Spain) Emilio de Villota | Williams |
| 7 | Mallory Park | 27 July | 75 | (Spain) Emilio de Villota | (United Kingdom) Guy Edwards | (Spain) Emilio de Villota | Williams |
| 8 | Snetterton | 10 August | 55 | (Chile) Eliseo Salazar | (Chile) Eliseo Salazar | (United Kingdom) Guy Edwards | Arrows |
| 9 | Brands Hatch | 25 August | 40 | (Spain) Emilio de Villota | (Spain) Emilio de Villota | (Spain) Emilio de Villota | Williams |
| 10 | Thruxton | 7 September | 43 | (Chile) Eliseo Salazar | (Chile) Eliseo Salazar | (Chile) Eliseo Salazar | Williams |
| 11 | Oulton Park | 20 September | 65 | (Chile) Eliseo Salazar | (United Kingdom) Guy Edwards | (United Kingdom) Jim Crawford | Chevron |
| 12 | Silverstone | 5 October | 35 | (Spain) Emilio de Villota | (Spain) Emilio de Villota | (Spain) Emilio de Villota | Williams |

=== Drivers' standings ===
Points are awarded to the top six classified finishers using the following structure:

| Position | **1st** | **2nd** | **3rd** | **4th** | **5th** | **6th** | **PP** | **FL** |
| Points | 9 | 6 | 4 | 3 | 2 | 1 | 2 | 1 |

| Pos. | Driver | OUL (United Kingdom) | BRH (United Kingdom) | SIL (United Kingdom) | MAL (United Kingdom) | THR (United Kingdom) | MNZ (Italy) | MAL (United Kingdom) | SNE (United Kingdom) | BRH (United Kingdom) | THR (United Kingdom) | OUL (United Kingdom) | SIL (United Kingdom) | Pts |
|---|---|---|---|---|---|---|---|---|---|---|---|---|---|---|
| 1 | (Spain) Emilio de Villota | **2** | **Ret** | 2 | 1 | 5 | **1** | **1** | 3 | **1** | 2 | Ret | **1** | 85 |
| 2 | (Chile) Eliseo Salazar | Ret | 3 | **1** | **Ret** | **1** | Ret | 7 | **2** | Ret | **1** | **Ret** | Ret | 52 |
| 3 | (United Kingdom) Guy Edwards | 1 | Ret | 4 | Ret | 3 | 2 | 2 | 1 | 5 | Ret | 4 | 2 | 51 |
| 4 | (United Kingdom) Jim Crawford | 4 | | 6 | 3 | 13 | Ret | 4 | 4 | 6 | Ret | 1 | 8 | 24 |
| 5 | (Italy) Giacomo Agostini | | 4 | Ret | | 4 | 3 | | Ret | 3 | 3 | | 3 | 22 |
| 6 | (South Africa) Desiré Wilson | Ret | 1 | 8 | Ret | 2 | | 3 | | Ret | | | | 21 |
| 7 | (United Kingdom) Norman Dickson | Ret | 2 | Ret | 2 | 11 | | | | | | | | 12 |
| 8 | (United Kingdom) Valentino Musetti | | | | | 6 | 5 | Ret | 6 | 4 | Ret | 3 | 12 | 11 |
| 9 | (United Kingdom) Brian Robinson | 5 | 6 | Ret | 5 | 8 | 9 | 9 | 8 | 9 | 4 | 5 | 10 | 10 |
| 10 | (United States) Kevin Cogan | | | 5 | Ret | | Ret | Ret | Ret | 2 | | | | 8 |
| = | (United Kingdom) Kim Mather | Ret | | 7 | Ret | Ret | | 8 | 7 | Ret | 6 | 2 | 6 | 8 |
| = | (United Kingdom) Ray Mallock | 3 | | 3 | | Ret | | | | Ret | Ret | | Ret | 8 |
| 13 | (United Kingdom) Warren Booth | 7 | | 10 | 4 | 12 | Ret | Ret | 9 | | 5 | Ret | 13 | 5 |
| 14 | (Italy) Gimax | | | | | Ret | 4 | | | | | | | 3 |
| = | (United Kingdom) Mike Wilds | | | | | | | | | | | | 4 | 3 |
| = | (United Kingdom) Paul Smith | | | | | | | 6 | | 7 | Ret | | 5 | 3 |
| = | (United Kingdom) Robin Smith | | | | | | 6 | 5 | | 8 | | | | 3 |
| = | (United Kingdom) Tony Dean | 6 | 5 | 9 | Ret | | | | | | | | | 3 |
| 19 | (Argentina) Leon Walger | | | | | | 8 | 10 | 5 | NC | | Ret | NC | 2 |
| 20 | (United Kingdom) Divina Galica | | | | | | | | | | | 6 | 9 | 1 |
| = | (United Kingdom) Bob Howlings | NC | Ret | 11 | 6 | Ret | | | | | | Ret | NC | 1 |
| — | (United Kingdom) Ron Harper | | | | 7 | | Ret | | | | | | 15 | 0 |
| — | (Republic of Ireland) Vivian Candy | | | | Ret | 7 | | | | | | | | 0 |
| — | (Italy) Guido Daccò | | | | | | 7 | | | | | | | 0 |
| — | (Colombia) Ricardo Londoño | | | | | | | | | | | | 7 | 0 |
| — | (United Kingdom) Paul Gibson | | | | | 9 | Ret | | | | | | | 0 |
| — | (United Kingdom) Roy Baker | | | | DNS | 10 | NC | 11 | NC | Ret | NC | Ret | 14 | 0 |
| — | (United Kingdom) Dennis Leech | | | | | | | | | | | | 11 | 0 |
| — | (United Kingdom) Tony Trimmer | | | | Ret | DNS | | | Ret | Ret | Ret | | | 0 |
| — | (United Kingdom) Geoff Lees | Ret | Ret | | | | | | | | | | | 0 |
| — | (Italy) Alberto Colombo | | | | | | Ret | | | | | | | 0 |
| — | (Italy) Renzo Zorzi | | | | | | Ret | | | | | | | 0 |
| — | (Italy) Gianfranco Brancatelli | | | | | | Ret | | | | | | | 0 |
| — | (United Kingdom) John Lewis | | | | | | | | | | | | Ret | 0 |
| — | (Italy) Piercarlo Ghinzani | | | | | | DNS | | | | | | | 0 |
| — | (Italy) Gianfranco | | | | | | DNS | | | | | | | 0 |
| — | (United Kingdom) Terry Fisher | | | | | | | | DNS | | | | | 0 |
| — | (United Kingdom) Richard Jones | | | | | | | | | | | DNS | | 0 |
| Pos. | Driver | OUL (United Kingdom) | BRH (United Kingdom) | SIL (United Kingdom) | MAL (United Kingdom) | THR (United Kingdom) | MNZ (Italy) | MAL (United Kingdom) | SNE (United Kingdom) | BRH (United Kingdom) | THR (United Kingdom) | OUL (United Kingdom) | SIL (United Kingdom) | Pts |

| Colour | Result |
|---|---|
| Gold | Winner |
| Silver | Second place |
| Bronze | Third place |
| Green | Points classification |
| Blue | Non-points classification |
| Blue | Non-classified finish (NC) |
| Purple | Retired, not classified (Ret) |
| Red | Did not qualify (DNQ) |
| Red | Did not pre-qualify (DNPQ) |
| Black | Disqualified (DSQ) |
| White | Did not start (DNS) |
| White | Withdrew (WD) |
| White | Race cancelled (C) |
| Blank | Did not practice (DNP) |
| Blank | Did not arrive (DNA) |
| Blank | Excluded (EX) |

**Bold** – Pole
Italics – Fastest Lap
