= Fulvio Ballabio =

Italian racing driver

Fulvio Maria Ballabio (born 8 October 1954) is a race car driver born in Milan, Italy. He raced in Formula Two in 1983, in Formula 3000 in 1986 and six starts in CART from 1987 to 1989 for Dick Simon Racing and Dale Coyne Racing. More recently, he drove in two races of the 2004 Formula X Sport Series.

In 1983, Ballabio started the Monte Carlo Automobile car manufacturer.

In 1989, Ballabio designed the Monte Carlo GTB (MCA Centenaire), a sports car, built of carbon fibre. The idea came from Lamborghini Countach Evoluzione (the first car in the world made in carbon fibre, completed in 1986). The engine, a V12 Biturbo with 720 horsepower, was modified by Carlo Chiti, who used to work for Alfa Romeo. The company, "Monte Carlo Automobile" was based in Fontvieille, Monaco. Originally, the project was to make 100 supercars, but the project failed with only five cars made in the initial period, including the spider car named "Beau Rivage".

In 2005, Ballabio started as Montecarlo Automobile the collaboration with FIA/ACI/CSAI in the challenge of car powered by green energy from the street legal ALA 50 presented in 2008 powered by Methane and LPG and the Quadrifuel "Carlo Chiti" powered by Methane, Ethanol fuel, LPG and gasoline with which got the podium in the Methane class of FIA Alternative Energies Cup to the Montecarlo/BRC W 12 powered by LPG.

On 25 March 2012, Montecarlo/BRC competed in the 4 hours of international endurance race of Monza, getting the eighth position among other cars powered by gasoline like Ferrari 458, Lamborghini, Porsche, Chevrolet Corvette.

== Racing record ==
=== Complete European Formula Two Championship results ===
(key) (Races in bold indicate pole position; races in italics indicate fastest lap)

Year	Entrant	Chassis	Engine	1	2	3	4	5	6	7	8	9	10	11	12	Pos.	Pts
1983	Merzario Team Srl	Merzario M28	BMW	SIL; Ret	THR; Ret	HOC; 14	NÜR; Ret									16th	3
1983	Ecurie Armagnac Bigarre Nogaro	AGS JH19	BMW					VAL; Ret	PAU; 7	JAR; 12	DON; Ret	MIS; 5	PER; 9	ZOL; NC	MUG; 6	16th	3

=== Complete International Formula 3000 results ===
(key) (Races in bold indicate pole position; races in italics indicate fastest lap.)

Year	Entrant	Chassis	Engine	1	2	3	4	5	6	7	8	9	10	11	12	Pos.	Pts
1985	Lola Motorsport	Lola T950	Cosworth	SIL	THR	EST	NÜR	VAL	PAU	SPA	DIJ	PER	ÖST	ZAN	DON; 14	NC	0
1986	Écurie Monaco	Monte Carlo 001	Cosworth	SIL	VAL	PAU	SPA	IMO; DNQ	MUG	PER	ÖST	BIR	BUG	JAR		NC	0

=== Complete 24 Hours of Le Mans results ===
Year	Team	Co-Drivers	Car	Class	Laps	Pos.	Class Pos.
1986	(Germany) Obermaier Racing Team	(Germany) Jürgen Lässig (United Kingdom) Dudley Wood	Porsche 956	C1	345	5th	5th

=== CART PPG Indy Car World Series ===
(key) (Races in bold indicate pole position)

Year	Team	Chassis	Engine	1	2	3	4	5	6	7	8	9	10	11	12	13	14	15	16	Rank	Pts	Ref
1987	Dick Simon Racing	Lola T87/00	Cosworth DFX V8t	LBH	PHX	INDY	MIL	POR	MEA	CLE	TOR	MCH	POC	ROA	MDO	NAZ	LAG	MIA; 26		48th	0	
1988	Dick Simon Racing	Lola T87/00	Cosworth DFX V8t	PHX	LBH; 25	INDY	MIL	POR	CLE	TOR	MEA	MCH	POC	MDO; 17	ROA; 18	NAZ	LAG	MIA		39th	0	
1989	Dale Coyne Racing	Lola T88/00	Cosworth DFX V8t	PHX	LBH; 21	INDY	MIL	DET	POR	CLE	MEA	TOR	MCH	POC	MDO; 18	ROA; DNQ	NAZ	LAG		46th	0	
1990	Gohr Racing	Lola T88/00	Cosworth DFX V8t	PHX	LBH	INDY	MIL	DET	POR	CLE	MEA	TOR	MCH	DEN	VAN	MDO	ROA	NAZ	LAG; DNQ	NC	-	

== See also ==
- it:Montecarlo GTB Centenaire
