= British Formula One Championship =

Domestic F1 championship (1978–1982)

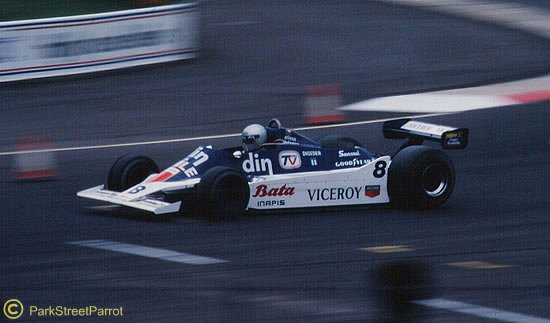
- Eliseo Salazar driving at the 1980 BRDC International Trophy
- Category: Single-seaters
- Country: United Kingdom
- Inaugural season: 1978
- Folded: 1982
- Drivers: 10 (1982)
- Teams: 8 (1982)
- Constructors: 8 (1982)
- Engine suppliers: 2 (1982)
- Last Drivers' champion: (United Kingdom) Jim Crawford

The British Formula One Championship, often abbreviated to British F1, was a Formula One motor racing championship held in the United Kingdom. It was often referred to as the Aurora AFX Formula One series due to the Aurora company's sponsorship of the series for three of the four seasons.

The long established Cosworth DFV engine helped make the series possible between 1978 and 1980. As in the South African Formula One Championship a decade or so before, second hand cars from manufacturers like Lotus and Fittipaldi Automotive were run by many entrants, although some, such as the March 781, were built specifically for the series. In 1980 Desiré Wilson became the only woman to win a Formula One race. She won at Brands Hatch driving a Wolf.

== Origins ==
The British Formula One Championship was a successor to the older Group 8 Shellsport Championship, which had previously run Formula 5000 cars. In 1977 the series was opened up to allow Formula One cars to race and the BRSCC upgraded it to a full Formula One championship a year later. Formula Two cars were also present on the grid to make up the numbers.

== Champions ==
Season	Championship Name	Champion	Team	Car	Races^{†}	Pole Positions	Wins	Podiums	Fastest Laps	Points	Margin (pts)	Ref(s)
1978	Aurora AFX British F1 Championship	(United Kingdom) Tony Trimmer	(United Kingdom) Melchester Racing	McLaren M23-Cosworth	8/12	4	5	8	5	149	56	
1979	Aurora AFX British F1 Championship	(United Kingdom) Rupert Keegan	(United Kingdom) Clowes Racing	Arrows A1-Cosworth	13/15	5	6	6	4	65	2	
1980	Aurora AFX British F1 Championship	(Spain) Emilio de Villota	(United Kingdom) RAM Racing	Williams FW07-Cosworth	12/12	6	5	9	4	85	33	
1981	no championship											
1982	British F1 Championship	(United Kingdom) Jim Crawford	(United Kingdom) Ensign Racing	Ensign N180-Cosworth	4/5	3	3	3	4	34	18	

^{†} x/y: Competed in x races of the season total y.
