= Teddy Yip =

Teddy Yip may refer to:

- Teddy Yip (businessman) (1907–2003), businessman from Indonesia who was instrumental in developing Macau as a tourist destination
  - Teddy Yip Jr. (born 1983), his son, team principal of the Status Grand Prix motor racing team
- Teddy Yip Wing Cho, an actor and film director
