= Theodore Racing =

Formula One racing team

Theodore
- Full name: Theodore Racing
- Base: Hong Kong
- Team principal(s): Teddy Yip Jr.
- Founder(s): Teddy Yip
- Noted staff: Sid Taylor; Julian Randles; Tony Southgate; Jo Ramírez
- Noted drivers: (France) Patrick Tambay (Finland) Keke Rosberg

Formula One World Championship career
- First entry: 1977 British Grand Prix
- Races entered: 63 (44 starts)
- Engines: Ford
- Constructors' Championships: 0
- Drivers' Championships: 0
- Race victories: 0
- Podiums: 0
- Pole positions: 0
- Fastest laps: 0
- Final entry: 1983 European Grand Prix

Theodore Racing (Chinese: 德利賽車隊香港) was a Formula One constructor from Hong Kong founded by real estate magnate and millionaire Teddy Yip. They participated in 51 Grands Prix, entering a total of 64 cars.

In the present day Theodore Racing is an international motor racing team owned by Teddy Yip Jr. competing in the Macau Grand Prix and Lamborghini Super Trofeo Asia.

Following its last race in 1992, the team made a successful return to racing at the Macau Grand Prix in 2013 under Teddy Yip Jr., owner of former GP3 team, Status Grand Prix.

Theodore Racing has won a record eight Macau Grands Prix – two as an independent team with Vern Schuppan and Geoff Lees, and six as a technical support team with the likes of Alex Lynn and Felix Rosenqvist.

== Founding ==
In the early 1970s, amateur racer Yip met Sid Taylor and agreed to sponsor Vern Schuppan in Formula 5000. This led to Yip backing Schuppan in Formula One with Ensign in 1974. There followed further involvement in America with Schuppan and then support of Alan Jones in the US F5000 series in 1976. In Australia, Schuppan won the Rothmans International Series for Yip driving a Lola T332-Chevrolet in 1976. That year Yip established Theodore Racing. It was run by Taylor and entered an Ensign for Patrick Tambay in F1.

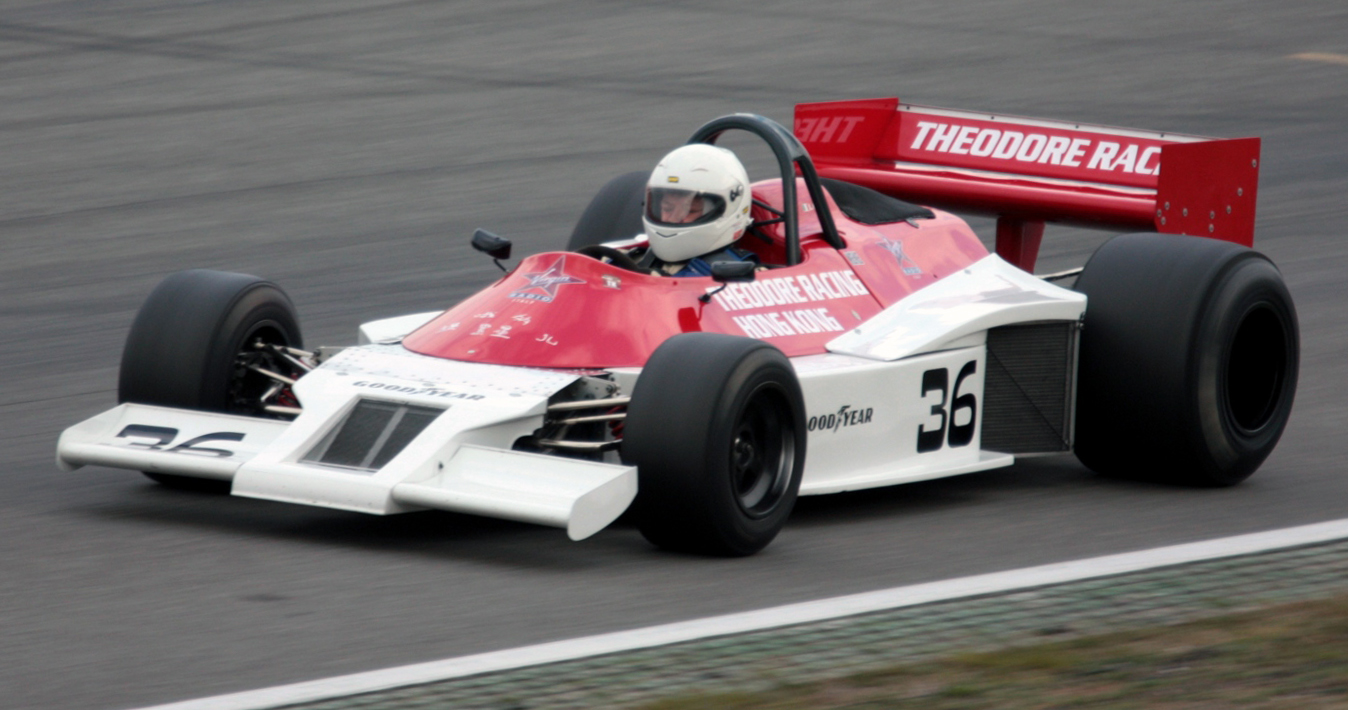
Theodore TR1 in historic racing

After a moderately successful half season in 1977, with driver Patrick Tambay scoring four points and finishing 17th overall, Yip commissioned Ron Tauranac to build him an F1 car. The car, called the Theodore TR1, was difficult and Eddie Cheever failed to qualify in both Brazil and Argentina but then Keke Rosberg took over and won the International Trophy at Silverstone in the wet. However, Keke only qualified for a single GP, in South Africa. The car was abandoned in the mid-season. In the US, Yip supported Dan Gurney's Eagle team.

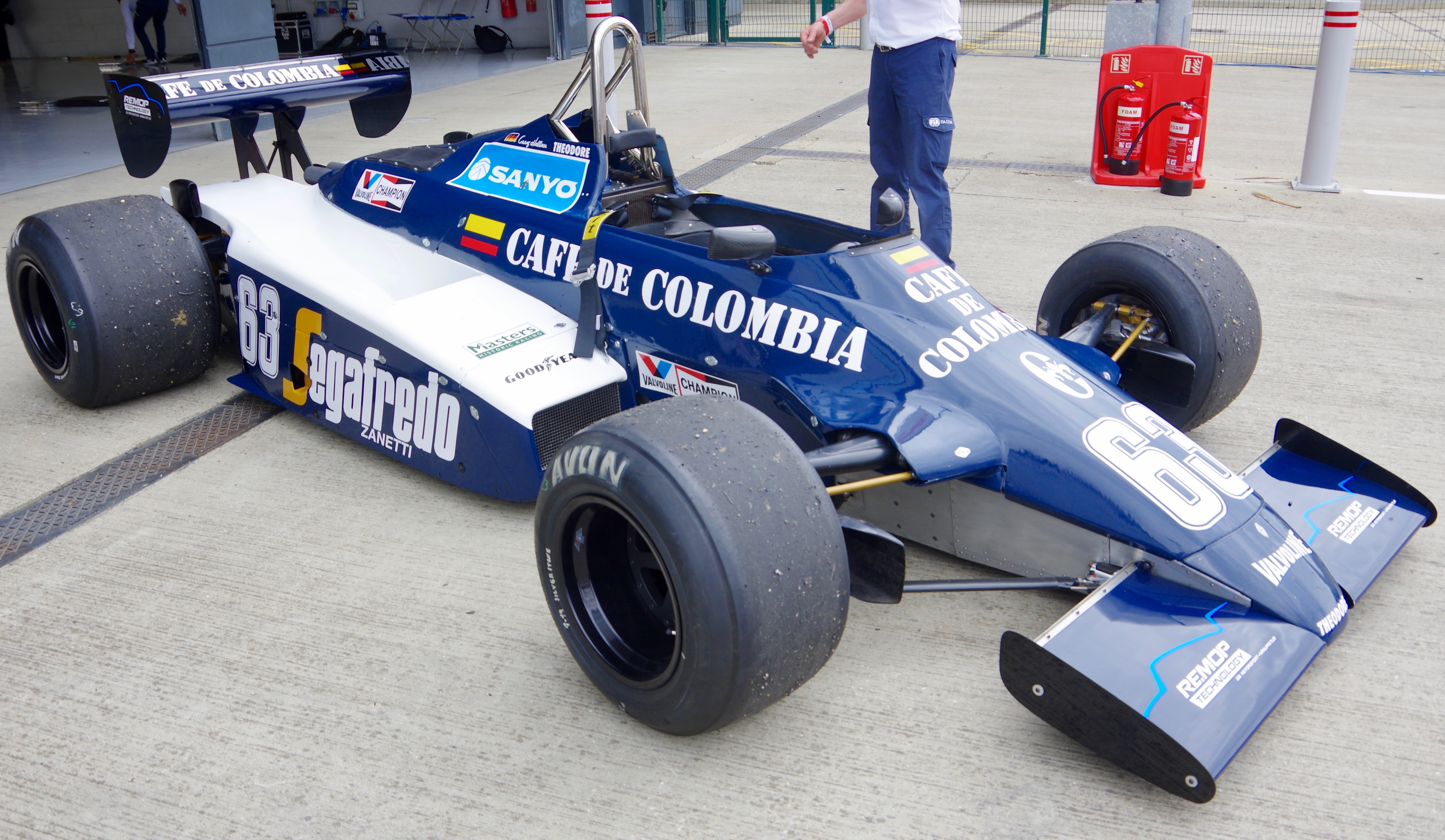
The Theodore N183 of Roberto Guerrero

In 1979, Yip helped to fund Ensign but the car was not a success. The car was driven by Derek Daly, Patrick Gaillard, and Marc Surer but there were no points scored. At the end of the year Teddy also funded a British F1 programme with a Wolf WR6 for David Kennedy and helped Desiré Wilson to become the first woman to win a Formula 1 race – albeit a national event.

Yip bought the Shadow team at the beginning of 1980, and Kennedy also moved to it, but the results were poor, the team was by then on its last legs, and in the mid-summer, Yip decided to retire the team and to rethink his involvement in racing and ended most of his other activities to concentrate on F1.

With Sid Taylor and Julian Randles he established Theodore Racing Ltd. and recruited Tony Southgate and team manager Jo Ramírez. The new car was dubbed the TY01 and was driven by Patrick Tambay at the start of 1981. In mid-season Tambay moved to Ligier and Yip gave the drive to Marc Surer. The same car was developed in 1982 and it became obvious that small teams could not easily survive in the turbo era. Yip merged Theodore with Ensign and used the Nigel Bennett-designed Ensign N183 design as a Theodore. The team hired Johnny Cecotto and Roberto Guerrero but at the end of that season the team shut down and Mo Nunn moved to America, where he enjoyed great success as a race engineer through the 1980s and into the 1990s and eventually set up a successful team of his own in CART.

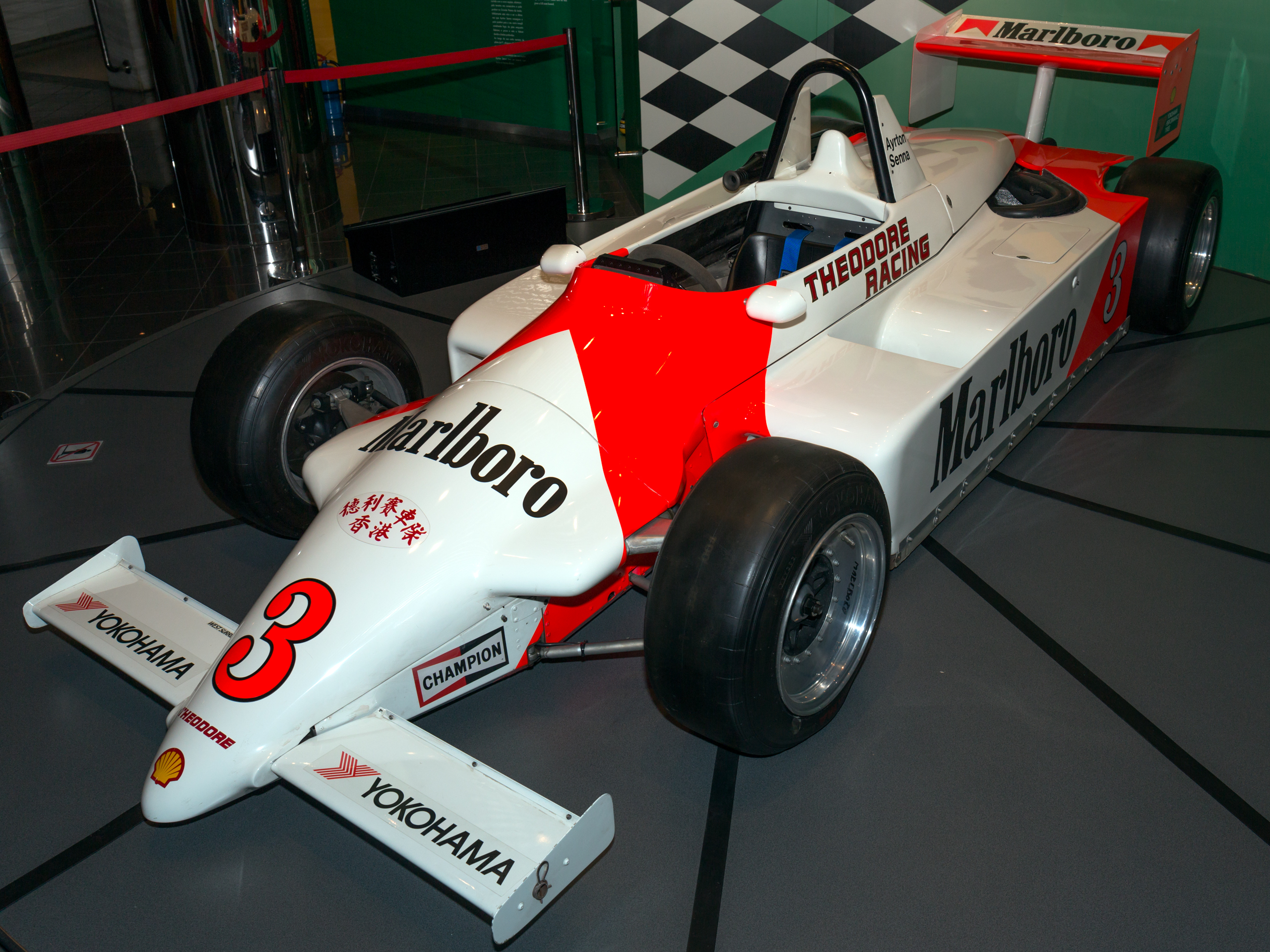
The Ralt RT3 used by Ayrton Senna at the 1983 Macau Grand Prix

1983 also saw a guest drive in a Theodore by former Grand Prix driver Brian Henton at the non-championship 1983 Race of Champions where he finished fourth, the highest a Theodore finished all season.

== 2013 revival ==
In October 2013, it was announced that the name Theodore Racing would be revived by Teddy Yip's son, Teddy Yip Jr., for the 2013 Macau Grand Prix to mark the 30th anniversary of Senna's victory in the event. After Briton Alex Lynn won the race, Teddy Yip Jr. said, "This was a fairytale way for the Theodore name to return to the great Macau Grand Prix in its anniversary year. To be with SJM to witness Alex's victory is an emotional day, and a fitting tribute to my father's contribution to this great Macau event."

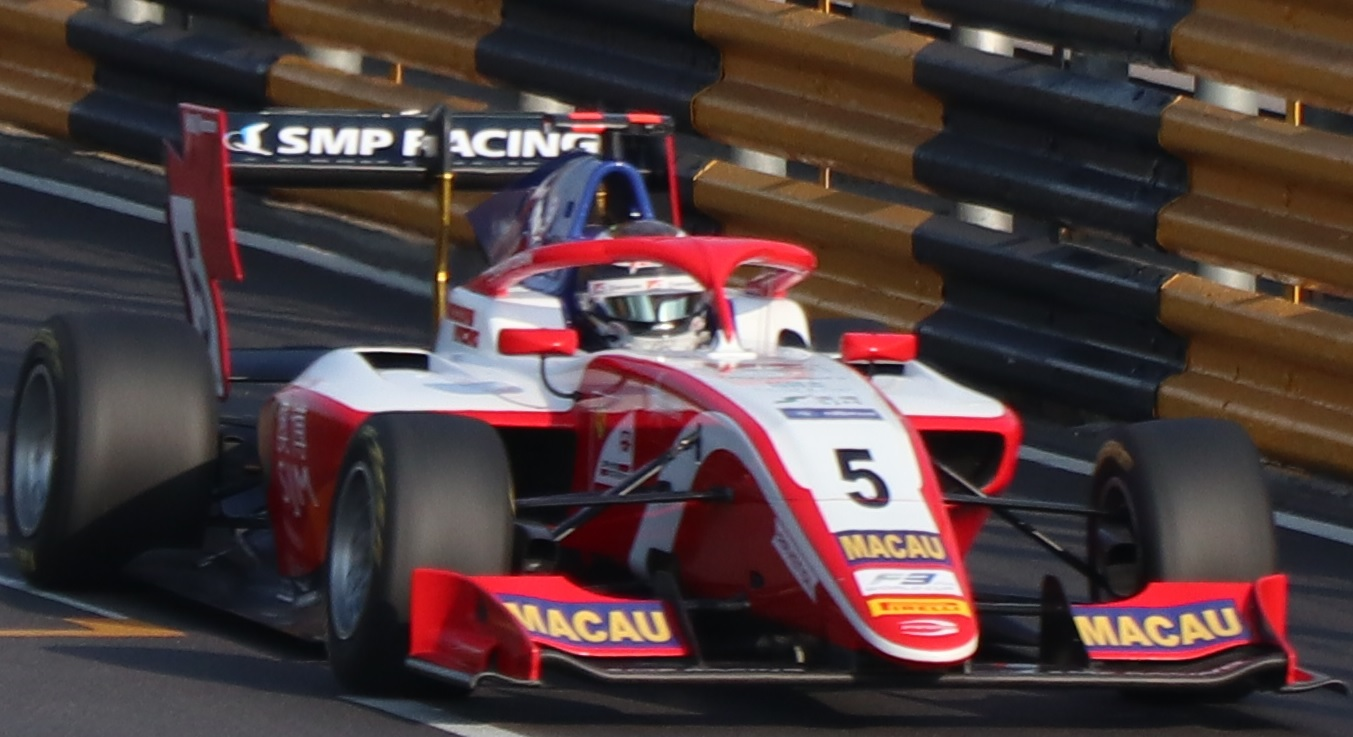
Robert Shwartzman racing for Theodore Racing in Macau in 2019.

The 2017 Macau GP and FIA F3 World Cup event saw SJM Theodore field Callum Ilott alongside Mick Schumacher, Maximilian Günther and Guanyu Zhou in their line up. Ilott headed their qualifying score sheet with a P3, newly signed as a Ferrari Junior that month. Günther qualified P4, Schumacher in P7 and Guanyu Zhou in P10. Ilott went on to win the Macau Qualifying Race with a lead of 7.957s ahead of the rest of the field. The other SJM Theodore cars came in with P4 (Günther), P10 (Zhou) and P20 (Schumacher). The Sunday Macau GP was marred for SJM Theodore by a first lap racing incident between Ilott and Joel Erikkson, as Ilott retook the lead, taking them out of the lead of the race, which was won by Dan Ticktum. Günther, Guanyu Zhou and Schumacher finished 5th, 8th, and 16th respectively.

Following its success at the Macau GP, in 2018 Theodore Racing collaborated with Prema Racing to form Prema Theodore Racing, which competed in the ADAC Formula 4 Championship, Italian F4 Championship, FIA Formula 3 European Championship, and the Formula 2 Championship, ultimately winning the Italian Formula 4 and European Formula 3 titles.

== Indy cars ==
Theodore began participating in Indy cars in 1977 as a sponsor for the Simpson Sport team in the USAC National Championship starting off the season with a pair of McLaren M16C-Offenhausers for Simpson to drive as No. 38 and for Steve Krisiloff to drive as No. 39.

At the season-opening Datsun Twin 200 at Ontario Motor Speedway with Simpson finishing in ninth and Krisiloff retiring due to clutch issues. Krisiloff would then leave the team. At the Indianapolis 500 Simpson retired from driving and Formula One driver Clay Regazzoni would first drive the No. 38. The car was then destroyed in a practice crash by Regazzoni. Regazzoni qualified the No. 39 in 29th place but retired from the race with a fuel leak after 25 laps, finishing in 30th place. After Indianapolis, Rick Mears would drive the car starting at the Schafer's 500 at Pocono International Raceway. Mears would get a best finish of fifth place at the Tony Bettenhausen 200 at Wisconsin State Fairgrounds Park Speedway. Mears would finish 20th in the final point standings.

Theodore would return in 1979 to sponsor All American Racers in the SCCA/CART PPG World Series for # Eagle 79-Cosworth DFX driven by Mike Mosley. Mosley would get a best finish of third place at the Indianapolis 500, where he would also set the fastest lap of the race. Mosley finished 10th in the championship.

In 1980, Theodore returned with AAR and Mosley. They originally fielded the No. 48 Eagle 80-Cosworth DFX at the Datsun Twin 200 at Ontario Motor Speedway. In the race, Mosley retired in 19th place due to a broken cylinder. Starting at the Indianapolis 500 the team replaced the Cosworth engine with a Chevrolet V8. Mosley qualified in 26th place and retired after five laps due to a broken gasket, finishing in 32nd place. the Theodore/AAR team appeared again at the True Value 500 at Pocono International Raceway before parting ways. In the race, Mosley qualified in fourth place and finished in 23rd place after retiring due to a burnt piston. Mosley finished 41st in the championship.

In 1981, Theodore fielded their own car. They first appeared at the Indianapolis 500 (part of the USAC Gold Crown Series) with the No. 33 Red Roof Inns McLaren M24-Cosworth DFX with Vern Schuppan driving. The car qualified in 18th place and finish in third place. The team also raced at the Van Scoy Diamond Mines 500 at Pocono International Raceway. The car started in fifth place and retired in 17th place due to a loss of oil pressure. Schuppan went on the finish 10th in the USAC standings. The team also competed in the CART/PPG World Series, with Schuppan driving. The team first appeared at the Norton Michigan 500 at Michigan International Speedway finishing in 24th place due to a blown engine. The team then went into partnership with Thomas W. Barrett III for the AirCal 500K at Riverside International Raceway, the II Copa Mexico 150 at Autodromo Hermanos Rodriguez and the Miller High Life 150 at Phoenix International Raceway. The team replaced the McLaren M24 with a March 81C for Riverside. Schuppan achieved a best finish of 15th place at Phoenix and finished 36th in points.

At the 1982 Indianapolis 500 (counted toward the 1981–82 USAC Gold Crown Series) Theodore would field with Bob Fletcher Racing a car for Desire Wilson, the No. 33 Eagle 81-Cosworth DFX. Wilson failed to qualify. Teddy Yip Sr. was attending the race while Teddy Yip Jr. was born.

In 1983, Theodore supplied factory-backed chassis for Tom Sneva and Kevin Cogan, fielded by Bignotti-Carter Racing. The chassis was practised by both drivers at the Indianapolis 500. Both would use a March 83C in the race, which Sneva won and Cogan finished in fifth place. Later in the season, Cogan used the chassis with a Cosworth DFX at the Provimi Veal 200 at Road America and the Escort Radar Warning 200 at Mid-Ohio Sports Car Course. Cogan retired from Road America in 19th place due to an electrical problem and finished sixth at Mid Ohio and in 15th place in the final standings (most of the points were scored using a March chassis). The chassis was then used by Ed Wachs Motor Sports for Jim Crawford.

Crawford achieved a fourth-place finish at the 1984 season-opening Toyota Grand Prix of Long Beach at the Streets of Long Beach. Crawford failed to qualify at the Indianapolis 500 and started one other race, the Meadowlands Grand Prix at the Meadowlands Sports Complex, retiring in 21st place due to broken suspension. Crawford would finish in 27th place in the final standings.

In 2016, Theodore Racing returned to the IndyCar Series to contest three rounds of the 2016 season; Toyota Grand Prix of Long Beach; Angie's List Grand Prix of Indianapolis and the 100th running of the Indianapolis 500, where Graham Rahal’s No. 15 Honda will be entered under 'Rahal Letterman Lanigan with Theodore Racing'.

== Lamborghini Super Trofeo Asia ==
Multiple Macau Grand Prix winners SJM Theodore Racing joined forces with Iron Lynx for 2024 to campaign 22-year-old Macau talent Charles Leong Hon Chio and Japanese female racer Miki Koyama in the 2024 Lamborghini Super Trofeo Asia (LSTA), which got underway at Malaysia’s Sepang International Circuit on May 3-5.

2025 sees Theodore Racing return supported by long-time partner, Macau-based integrated resorts operator SJM Resorts S.A.. SJM Theodore Racing is set to contest all six rounds of the 2025 championship as well as the Lamborghini Super Trofeo World Finals at Misano, Italy, in November. Macau talent Charles Leong Hon Chio returns to the drivers seat, joined by new signing Alex Denning from Ireland, for the series which takes place across three continents.

== Complete Formula One results ==
Year	Chassis	Engines	Tyres	Drivers	1	2	3	4	5	6	7	8	9	10	11	12	13	14	15	16	17	WCC	Points
1977	Ensign N177	Ford Cosworth DFV 3.0 V8	**G**		ARG	BRA	RSA	USW	ESP	MON	BEL	SWE	FRA	GBR	GER	AUT	NED	ITA	USA	CAN	JPN	—N/a^{1}	—N/a^{1}
1977	Ensign N177	Ford Cosworth DFV 3.0 V8	**G**	(France) Patrick Tambay										Ret	6	Ret	5	Ret	DNQ	5	Ret	—N/a^{1}	—N/a^{1}
1978	TR1	Ford Cosworth DFV 3.0 V8	**G**		ARG	BRA	RSA	USW	MON	BEL	ESP	SWE	FRA	GBR	GER	AUT	NED	ITA	USA	CAN		NC	0
1978	TR1	Ford Cosworth DFV 3.0 V8	**G**	(United States) Eddie Cheever	DNQ	DNQ																NC	0
1978	TR1	Ford Cosworth DFV 3.0 V8	**G**	(Finland) Keke Rosberg			Ret	DNPQ	DNPQ	DNQ	DNPQ											NC	0
1978	Wolf WR3; Wolf WR4	Ford Cosworth DFV 3.0 V8	**G**	(Finland) Keke Rosberg											10	NC	Ret	DNPQ				—N/a^{1}	—N/a^{1}
1979–1980: Theodore did not compete.
1981	TY01	Ford Cosworth DFV 3.0 V8	**M** **A**		USW	BRA	ARG	SMR	BEL	MON	ESP	FRA	GBR	GER	AUT	NED	ITA	CAN	CPL			12th	1
1981	TY01	Ford Cosworth DFV 3.0 V8	**M** **A**	(France) Patrick Tambay	6	10	Ret	11	DNQ	7	13											12th	1
1981	TY01	Ford Cosworth DFV 3.0 V8	**M** **A**	(Switzerland) Marc Surer								12	11	14	Ret	8	DNQ	9	Ret			12th	1
1982	TY01; TY02	Ford Cosworth DFV 3.0 V8	**A** **G**		RSA	BRA	USW	SMR	BEL	MON	DET	CAN	NED	GBR	FRA	GER	AUT	SUI	ITA	CPL		NC	0
1982	TY01; TY02	Ford Cosworth DFV 3.0 V8	**A** **G**	(Republic of Ireland) Derek Daly	14	Ret	Ret															NC	0
1982	TY01; TY02	Ford Cosworth DFV 3.0 V8	**A** **G**	(Netherlands) Jan Lammers					DNQ	DNQ	DNQ		Ret	DNQ	DNQ							NC	0
1982	TY01; TY02	Ford Cosworth DFV 3.0 V8	**A** **G**	(United Kingdom) Geoff Lees								Ret										NC	0
1982	TY01; TY02	Ford Cosworth DFV 3.0 V8	**A** **G**	(Republic of Ireland) Tommy Byrne												DNQ	Ret	DNQ	DNQ	Ret		NC	0
1983	N183	Ford Cosworth DFV 3.0 V8	**G**		BRA	USW	FRA	SMR	MON	BEL	DET	CAN	GBR	GER	AUT	NED	ITA	EUR	RSA			12th	1
1983	N183	Ford Cosworth DFV 3.0 V8	**G**	(Colombia) Roberto Guerrero	NC	Ret	Ret	Ret	DNPQ	Ret	NC	Ret	16	Ret	Ret	12	13	12				12th	1
1983	N183	Ford Cosworth DFV 3.0 V8	**G**	(Venezuela) Johnny Cecotto	14	6	11	Ret	DNPQ	10	Ret	Ret	DNQ	11	DNQ	DNQ	12					12th	1

Notes

- **^1** – Not entered as a Constructor.

=== Formula One non-championship results ===
(key) (Races in bold indicate pole position) (Races in italics indicate fastest lap)

Year	Chassis	Engines	Tyres	Drivers	1	2	3
1975	Lola T332	Chevrolet 5.0 V8	G		ROC	INT	SUI
1975	Lola T332	Chevrolet 5.0 V8	G	(Australia) Vern Schuppan	Ret^{2}		
1978	TR1	Ford Cosworth DFV 3.0 V8	G		INT		
1978	TR1	Ford Cosworth DFV 3.0 V8	G	(Finland) Keke Rosberg	1		
1979	Wolf WR4	Ford Cosworth DFV 3.0 V8	G		ROC	GNM	DIN
1979	Wolf WR4	Ford Cosworth DFV 3.0 V8	G	(Republic of Ireland) David Kennedy	DNS^{3}		
1981	TR2	Ford Cosworth DFV 3.0 V8	G		RSA		
1981	TR2	Ford Cosworth DFV 3.0 V8	G	(United Kingdom) Geoff Lees	Ret		
1983	N183	Ford Cosworth DFV 3.0 V8	G		ROC		
1983	N183	Ford Cosworth DFV 3.0 V8	G	(Colombia) Roberto Guerrero	7		
1983	N183	Ford Cosworth DFV 3.0 V8	G	(United Kingdom) Brian Henton	4		

Notes

- **^2** – Formula 5000 driver.
- **^3** – Aurora AFX F1 driver.

== Lamborginhi Super Trofeo Asia Results ==
=== 2024 ===
The duo made an impressive entrance to the 11th season of the prestigious Lamborghini Super Trofeo, taking two podium finishes on their championship debut amongst a strong international field.

Rounds 2 and 3 in Australia and South Korea also saw Leong Hon Chio and Miki Koyama finish in double podium positions, with Round 4 in Fuji resulting in a 5th place in Race 1 and 2nd in Race 2.

=== Pro ===
Driver	Team	(Malaysia) SEP		(Australia) BEN		(South Korea) INJ		(Japan) FUJ		(China) SHA		(Spain) JER		Pos.	Pts
Driver	Team	R1	R2	R1	R2	R1	R2	R1	R2	R1	R2	R1	R2	Pos.	Pts
(Japan) Miki Koyama (Macau) Hon Chio Leong	(Italy) SJM Iron Lynx Theodore Racing	2	2	3	3	2	3	5	2	4	3	3	2	2nd	127

=== Lamborghini Cup ===
Driver	Team	(Malaysia) SEP		(Australia) BEN		(South Korea) INJ		(Japan) FUJ		(China) SHA		(Spain) JER		Pos.	Pts
Driver	Team	R1	R2	R1	R2	R1	R2	R1	R2	R1	R2	R1	R2	Pos.	Pts
(Malaysia) Kumar Prabakaran	(Italy) SJM Iron Lynx Theodore Racing	Ret	3	4	4	2	2	Ret	3			2	3	3rd	86

=== 2025 ===
Supported by long-time partner, Macau-based integrated resorts operator SJM Resorts S.A., SJM Theodore Racing contested all six rounds of the 2025 championship as well as the Lamborghini Super Trofeo World Finals at Misano, Italy, in November.

Macau talent Charles Leong Hon Chio returned to the drivers seat, joined by a new signing for 2025 Alex Denning from Ireland, for the series which took place across three continents.

The duo produced an amazing eight wins and four second place finishes from 12 races. The pair claimed both the driver and team prize for the 2025 Asian Championship.

It also neatly bookended the Asian championship which began with two races wins in Sydney last April and has concluded in Europe with another two visits to the top step of the podium.

=== Pro ===
Driver	Team	(Australia) SYD		(China) SHA		(Japan) FUJ		(South Korea) INJ		(Malaysia) SEP		(Italy) MIS		Pos.	Pts	Team standings
Driver	Team	R1	R2	R1	R2	R1	R2	R1	R2	R1	R2	R1	R2	Pos.	Pts	Team standings
(Macau) Hon Chio Leong (Republic of Ireland) Alex Denning	(Macau) SJM Theodore Racing	1	1	2	1	2	1	2	1	1	2	1	1	1st	171	1st
