= Ian Grob =

English racing driver (born 1952)

- Nationality: English
- Born: 24 August 1952 (age 74) Barnet, Hertfordshire, England, Great Britain
- Retired: 1980
- Relatives: Ken Grob (father)

Ian Grob (born 24 August 1952) is a former English racing driver. He raced in a number of events, including European Formula 2 and Le Mans 24 Hours. He retired from international motor sport after his last race, 1980 24 Hours of Daytona.

== Early life ==
Grob was born in Barnet, Hertfordshire. His father, Ken Grob, of Token Racing fame, ran his cars, which allowed Ian his opportunity to race.

== Career ==
In 1973, he decided to head to Europe with his Chevron B23 to learn his trade. His best results from these outing was a fifth place at the Circuit de Croix-en-Ternois in a round of the Championnat de France des Circuits. His team, KVG Racing recruited John Hine, to partner Grob in the South African Springbok Trophy Series. His partnership brought Grob his first podium finish, a third place in the Kyalami 9 Hours, with it, a class win.

1974 saw Grob returned to Europe with his KVG Racing entered Chevron B23, partnered by Hine in the Endurance races. Despite a win in a non-championship at Avus, he either finished in the lower reaches of the top-ten, or did not finish. They did secure a class win in the Nürburgring 1000 km, when finishing eighth. However, the following season started very well for Grob, with a class win in the 1000km of Mugello (fifth overall) alongside Hine. The pairing repeated this a fortnight later in the 800km of Dijon, finished on the podium as he and Hine took third overall. On the same day, 5 April, Grob also won a non-championship race at Nogaro, aboard the same model, Chevron B31. After a second place in another non-championship at Silverstone, a week later, this partnership seemed to lose their way. Grob did visit the podium following his second place in the Britannica 2000, at Brands Hatch in a round of the European 2-litre Sports Car Championship.

For the following season, Grob moved away from sportscar racing, to race single-seaters. He joined Modus Cars, to race their Modus-Hart M7 in the 1976 European Formula Two Championship. Of the 12 rounds, Grob only qualified in four of each them. He best finish was two 15th places at Thruxton and Estoril. His best result of the year was however, in a non-championship F2 race, when he finished fifth in the 39th Internationales ADAC-Eifelrennen on the Nürburgring Nordschleife. Late on in the season, Grob switched teams, joining Fred Opert Racing, to race their F2 Chevron-Hart B35, in a couple of Shellsport International Series races at Brands Hatch, finishing seventh and 14th.

Come 1977, Grob stepped down to Formula Three, hoping that would improve his results. He raced in both the British Formula Three Championships for Alan Docking Racing. In a Chevron-Toyota B38, he managed some decent results, such as fifth at Silverstone, and a third place in the non-championship B.R.S.C.C. Trophy race at Mallory Park.

During the European winter, Grob travelled to New Zealand for the 1978 Peter Stuyvesant International Formula Pacific Series. After teaming up with Sphere Drake Racing, he drove their March-Ford 763/77B, managing just one top sixth finish, on the temporary circuit at Wigram. For rest of the 1978 season, Grob returned to England, joining Ibec Racing Developments Hesketh Team for an assault on the 24 Hours of Le Mans. Partnered by Guy Edwards, the team's Ibec P6 suffered from mechanical troubles which dropped it to 42nd position after just a few hours. Despite recovering well from this early setback, in the 19th hour its Cosworth DFV engine failed completely and the Ibec's race was over.

Both Grob and Edwards returned to Le Mans in 1979. This time, they were entered by March Racing, in a BMW March M1, with the BMW supported driver, Dieter Quester. Despite this strong line-up, the trio failed to qualify for the race. A few weeks later, Manfred Winkelhock had replaced Quester for the Brands Hatch 6 Hours. After a strong qualifying, the car was fourth on the grid, but failed to finish the race.

In 1980, Grob went Stateside to the IMSA championship and drove March's BMW M1 in the 24 Hour Pepsi Challenge, at the Daytona. Although classified in 43rd place, the car failed to finish race due to drive shaft problems. This was to be Grob's last international appearance.

== Racing record ==
=== Career highlights ===
Season	Series	Position	Team	Car
1975	Interserie	22nd	KVG Racing	Chevron-Ford B31
1976	Shellsport G8 International Series	32nd	Modus Cars; Fred Opert Racing	Modus-Hart M7; Chevron-Hart B35
1977	B.R.D.C. Vandervell British F3 Championship	16th	Alan Docking Racing	Chevron-Toyota B38
1977	B.A.R.C. BP Super Visco F3 Championship	25th	Alan Docking Racing	Chevron-Toyota B38

=== Complete European Formula Two Championship results ===
(key) (Races in bold indicate pole position; races in italics indicate *fastest lap)

Year	Entrant	Chassis	Engine	1	2	3	4	5	6	7	8	9	10	11	12	Pos.	Pts
1976	KVG Team Modus	Modus M7	Hart	HOC; DNQ	THR; 15	VAL; DNQ	SAL; DNQ	PAU	HOC; DNQ	ROU	MUG; 21	PER; Ret	EST; 15	NOG; DNQ	HOC; DNQ	NC	0

=== Complete 24 Hours of Le Mans results ===
Year	Class	No	Tyres	Car	Team	Co-Drivers	Laps	Pos.	Class Pos.
1978	S+2.0	19	**G**	Ibec P6; Ford Cosworth DFV V8/90° 4v DOHC 2993cc	(United Kingdom) Ibec Racing Developments Hesketh Team	(United Kingdom) Guy Edwards	195	DNF (Con rod)	
1979	S+2.0	16	**D**	BMW March M1; BMW M88 L6 4v 3497cc	(United Kingdom) March Racing	(Austria) Dieter Quester (United Kingdom) Guy Edwards		DNQ (Reserve)	

=== Complete 24 Hours of Daytona results ===
Year	Class	No	Tyres	Car	Team	Co-Drivers	Laps	Pos.	Class Pos.
1980	GTX	11	**D**	BMW March M1; BMW M88 L6 4v 3497cc	(United Kingdom) March Engineering	(Germany) Michael Korten (Belgium) Patrick Nève	260	DNF (driveshaft)	
