= Derek Daly =

Irish racing driver (born 1953)

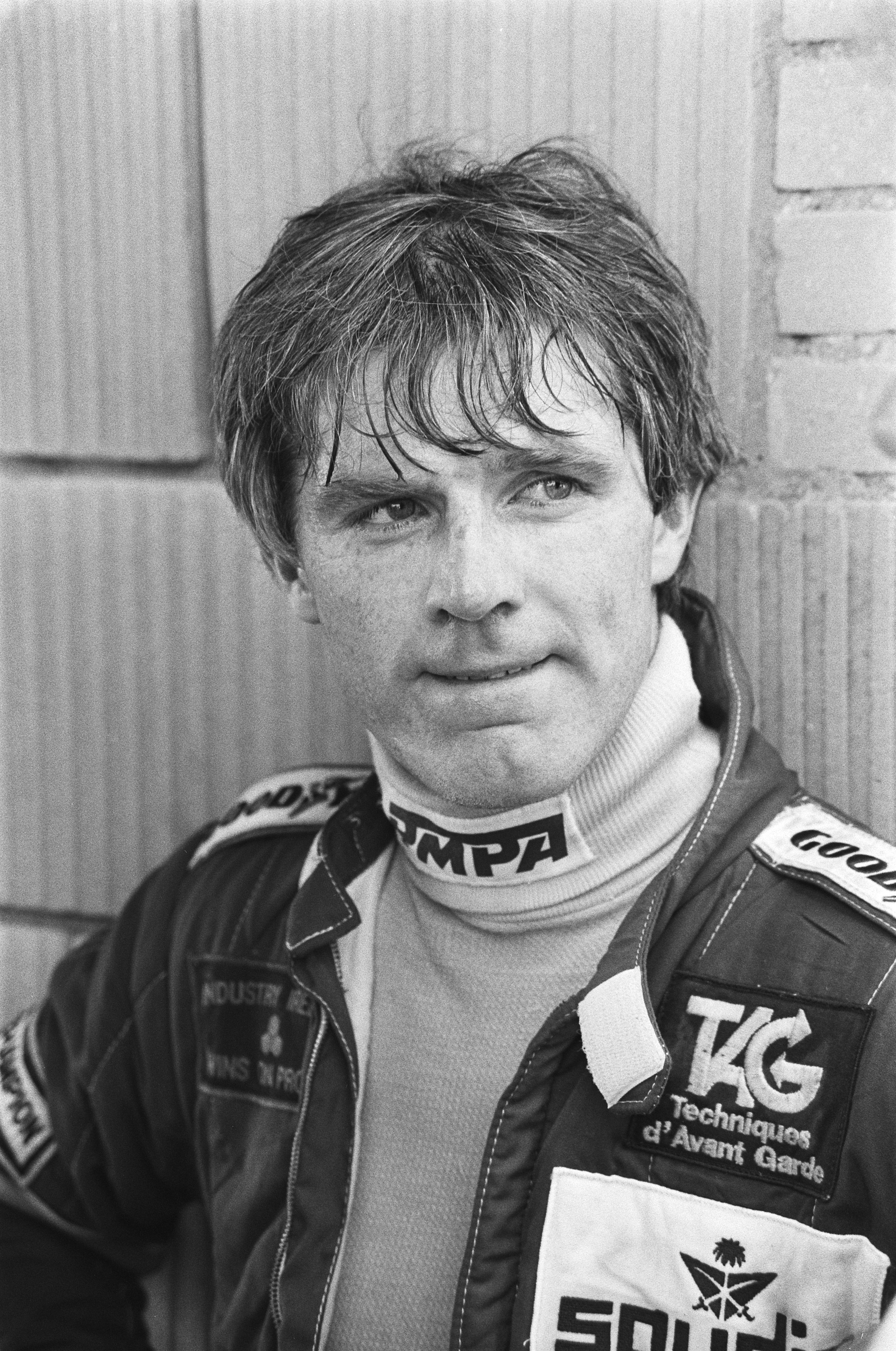
- Daly at the 1982 Dutch Grand Prix
- Born: Derek Patrick Daly; 11 March 1953 (age 73); Ballinteer, Dublin, Ireland
- Children: 3, including Conor
- Relatives: Nicola Daly (niece)

Formula One World Championship career
- Nationality: (Republic of Ireland) Irish
- Active years: 1978–1982
- Team(s): Hesketh, Ensign, Tyrrell, March, Theodore, Williams
- Entries: 64 (49 starts)
- Championships: 0
- Wins: 0
- Podiums: 0
- Career points: 15
- Pole positions: 0
- Fastest laps: 0
- First entry: 1978 United States Grand Prix West
- Last entry: 1982 Caesars Palace Grand Prix

Champ Car career
- 67 races run over 8 years
- Years active: 1982–1989
- Teams: Wysard, Provimi, Hess, Menard, Curb, Pace, Raynor
- Best finish: 9th (1988)
- First race: 1982 Miller High Life 150 (Phoenix)
- Last race: 1989 Toyota Grand Prix of Monterey (Laguna Seca)
| Wins | Podiums | Poles |
|---|---|---|
| 0 | 1 | 0 |

24 Hours of Le Mans career
- Years: 1988–1990
- Teams: Jaguar, Nissan
- Best finish: 4th (1988)
- Class wins: 0

Derek Patrick Daly (born 11 March 1953) is an Irish former racing driver, businessman and broadcaster, who competed in Formula One from 1978 to 1982.

Born and raised in Dublin, Daly won the British Formula Three Championship in 1977, before participating in 64 Formula One Grands Prix, debuting at the 1978 United States Grand Prix West. His 15 championship points made him the first Irish driver to score in Formula One, and remains the highest scoring; he also participated in several non-championship races. After Formula One, Daly moved to the United States to compete in CART and IMSA, where he led Nissan to the IMSA GTP Championship in 1990.

== Racing career ==
After honing his skills in the Irish Formula Ford Championship, Daly had his first drive in the European Formula Two Championship in 1977. In 1978 and 1979, he competed in both Formula Two and Formula One, finishing third in the Formula Two championship in both seasons. From 1980 to 1982, he focussed on Formula One, his best year being 1980, when he scored two fourth-place finishes and finished 11th in the Drivers' Championship. His two most memorable moments in F1 both came in the Monaco Grand Prix. In 1980 he crashed spectacularly at the first corner after vaulting three other cars. In 1982, he suddenly found himself in contention for the win when the four cars ahead of him ran into problems with under two laps to go, but ended up on the sidelines himself when his gearbox seized moments later.

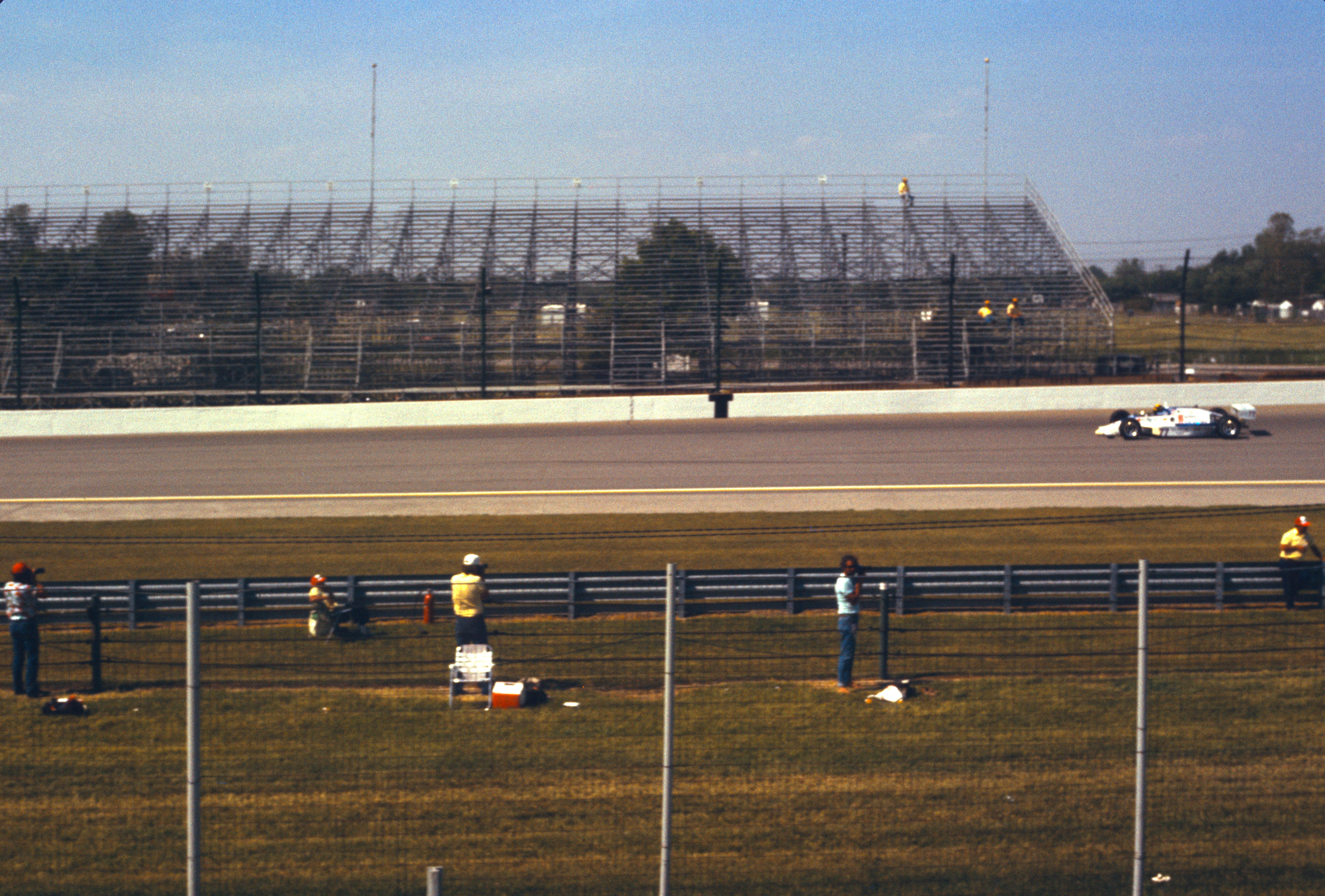
Daly qualifying for the 1987 Indianapolis 500

In 1982, Daly began driving in the CART series and continued through 1989. He started 66 CART races, including each Indianapolis 500 from 1983 to 1989, except for 1986. He finished in the top-ten a total of 21 times, including one podium finish, third position, at Milwaukee in 1987. In September 1984, he was nearly killed in a crash in the CART PPG Detroit News Grand Prix 200 at Michigan International Speedway. The front end of his car was sheared off and he suffered multiple injuries including a crushed left ankle, double compound fracture to the left tibia and fibula, fractured left hip socket, severely fractured pelvis, several broken left side ribs, broken left hand, third degree burns to the left arm, dislocated right foot and ankle, deep abrasions and soft tissue to right heel, and internal bleeding.

Daly won the 12 Hours of Sebring in 1990 and 1991 driving a Nissan GTP ZX-Turbo. In 1990, he had the unusual distinction of driving both the first and second-placed cars.

== Broadcast and business career ==
Daly is known in motor sports circles around the world as a driver, writer, broadcaster, racing advisor, and businessman. He runs a professional services company called MotorVation, and had been a commentator for American broadcasts of the Champ Car series, as well as a public speaker. One of the agencies that represents him is the National Speakers Bureau.

In 2018, Daly was fired from a racing analyst position he had at WISH-TV when WISH-TV attributed a racial slur that was uttered by Indianapolis Colts announcer Bob Lamey in 1983 to him. While not disputing saying the slur, Daly contends that he did not use the offending language in the context Lamey alleged (Lamey claimed that Daly had once stated "... there aren't any (racial slur) in this race"), but instead used the word as part of a common Irish colloquialism during a 1983 radio interview. Daly filed a $25M lawsuit as a result. Later that year, U.S. district court judge Richard L. Young ruled in favor of WISH-TV and the station's former parent company, Nexstar Media Group, in all claims in Daly's lawsuit and ordered him to pay Nexstar's legal costs.

== Personal life ==
Daly became a US citizen on September 28, 1993, and he now resides in Carmel, Indiana. He has three sons, Conor, Colin and Christian.

Conor is also a racing driver. He made his debut in full-time open-wheel racing in 2012, driving for the Lotus GP team in GP3, before moving GP2 in 2014 driving for Venezuela GP Lazarus. Conor made his IndyCar Series debut in 2013 and was a full-time driver from 2016 to 2023. He also competed in the 2023 Daytona 500, finishing 29th.

Daly's niece, Nicola Daly, is an Ireland women's field hockey international and was a member of the squad that won the silver medal at the 2018 Women's Hockey World Cup. She also works as a data engineer for Juncos Racing.

== Racing record ==
=== Career summary ===
| Season | Series | Team | Races | Wins | Poles | F/Laps | Podiums | Points | Position |
|---|---|---|---|---|---|---|---|---|---|
| 1976 | Formula Ford Festival | Hawke Racing Cars | 1 | 1 | 0 | 0 | 1 | 0 | **1st** |
| 1977 | Super Visco British Formula Three | Derek McMahon Racing | 15 | 4 | 1 | 0 | 7 | 69 | **1st** |
| 1977 | Vandervell British Formula Three | Derek McMahon Racing | 7 | 0 | 0 | 0 | 1 | 34 | 5th |
| 1977 | FIA European Formula 3 | Derek McMahon Racing | 4 | 1 | 1 | 0 | 2 | 13 | 9th |
| 1977 | European Formula Two | Chevron Racing | 1 | 0 | 0 | 0 | 0 | 2 | 18th |
| 1978 | European Formula Two | Chevron Racing | 12 | 2 | 1 | 2 | 4 | 27 | **3rd** |
| 1978 | Formula One | Olympus Cameras with Hesketh Racing | 0 | 0 | 0 | 0 | 0 | 1 | 19th |
| 1978 | Formula One | Team Tissot Ensign | 6 | 0 | 0 | 0 | 0 | 1 | 19th |
| 1979 | European Formula Two | Project Four Racing | 9 | 1 | 1 | 2 | 5 | 33 | **3rd** |
| 1979 | Formula One | Team Ensign | 3 | 0 | 0 | 0 | 0 | 0 | NC |
| 1979 | Formula One | Candy Tyrrell Team | 3 | 0 | 0 | 0 | 0 | 0 | NC |
| 1980 | Formula One | Candy Tyrrell Team | 14 | 0 | 0 | 0 | 0 | 6 | 11th |
| 1980 | BMW M1 Procar Championship | BMW Motorsport | 1 | 0 | 0 | 0 | 0 | 0 | NC |
| 1981 | Formula One | March Grand Prix Team Guinness RIzla+. March | 8 | 0 | 0 | 0 | 0 | 0 | NC |
| 1982 | Formula One | TAG Williams Team | 12 | 0 | 0 | 0 | 0 | 8 | 13th |
| 1982 | Formula One | Theodore Racing Team | 3 | 0 | 0 | 0 | 0 | 8 | 13th |
| 1982 | World Sportscar Championship | Ford Motor Company | 1 | 0 | 0 | 0 | 0 | 1 | 117th |
| 1982 | PPG Indy Car World Series | Wysard Racing | 1 | 0 | 0 | 0 | 0 | 0 | NC |
| 1983 | PPG Indy Car World Series | Provimi Racing | 5 | 0 | 0 | 0 | 0 | 4 | 27th |
| 1983 | PPG Indy Car World Series | Wysard Racing | 2 | 0 | 0 | 0 | 0 | 4 | 27th |
| 1983 | European Formula Two | McMahon Racing | 1 | 0 | 0 | 0 | 0 | 0 | NC |
| 1983 | World Sportscar | Team Ikuzawa | 0 | 0 | 0 | 0 | 0 | 0 | NC |
| 1984 | PPG Indy Car World Series | Provimi Racing | 11 | 0 | 0 | 0 | 0 | 26 | 19th |
| 1985 | PPG Indy Car World Series | Tom Hess Racing | 1 | 0 | 0 | 0 | 0 | 1 | 40th |
| 1986 | PPG Indy Car World Series | Curb Motorsports | 3 | 0 | 0 | 0 | 0 | 11 | 23rd |
| 1987 | PPG Indy Car World Series | Raynor Motorsports | 12 | 0 | 0 | 0 | 1 | 27 | 15th |
| 1987 | PPG Indy Car World Series | Pace Racing | 1 | 0 | 0 | 0 | 0 | 27 | 15th |
| 1988 | PPG Indy Car World Series | Raynor Motorsports | 15 | 0 | 0 | 0 | 0 | 53 | 9th |
| 1988 | 24 Hours of Le Mans | Silk Cut Jaguar | 1 | 0 | 0 | 0 | 0 | 30 | 4th |
| 1989 | PPG Indy Car World Series | Raynor Motorsports | 15 | 0 | 0 | 0 | 0 | 25 | 12th |
| 1989 | 24 Hours of Le Mans | Silk Cut Jaguar | 1 | 0 | 0 | 0 | 0 | N/A | DNF |
| 1990 | IMSA GT Championship | Nissan Performance | 4 | 4 | 1 | 0 | 4 | N/A | NC |
| 1990 | 24 Hours of Le Mans | Nissan Performance | 1 | 0 | 0 | 0 | 0 | N/A | DNF |
| 1991 | IMSA GT Championship | Nissan Performance | 1 | 1 | 1 | 0 | 1 | N/A | NC |

=== Complete European Formula Two Championship results ===
(key) (Races in bold indicate pole position; races in italics indicate fastest lap)

| Year | Entrant | Chassis | Engine | 1 | 2 | 3 | 4 | 5 | 6 | 7 | 8 | 9 | 10 | 11 | 12 | 13 | Pos | Pts |
|---|---|---|---|---|---|---|---|---|---|---|---|---|---|---|---|---|---|---|
| 1977 | Chevron Racing | Chevron/B40 | Hart | SIL | THR | HOC | NÜR | VLL | PAU | MUG | ROU | NOG | PER | MIS | EST; 5 | DON | 18th | 2 |
| 1978 | Chevron Racing | Chevron/B42 | Hart | THR; 6 | HOC; 9 | NÜR; Ret | PAU; 9 | MUG; 1 | VLL; 1 | ROU; 11 | DON; Ret | NOG; 3 | **PER**; 3 | MIS; 9 | HOC; Ret | | 3rd | 27 |
| 1979 | Project Four Racing | March/792 | BMW | SIL; 2 | HOC | THR; 2 | NÜR | VLL | **MUG**; Ret | PAU; Ret | HOC; 2 | ZAN; 11 | PER; 2 | MIS; Ret | **DON**; 1 | | 3rd | 33 |
| 1983 | McMahon Racing | March/822 | Hart | SIL | THR | HOC | NÜR | VLL | PAU | JAR | DON; 9 | MIS | PER | ZOL | MUG | | - | 0 |

=== Complete Formula One World Championship results ===
(key)

| Year | Entrant | Chassis | Engine | 1 | 2 | 3 | 4 | 5 | 6 | 7 | 8 | 9 | 10 | 11 | 12 | 13 | 14 | 15 | 16 | WDC | Pts. |
|---|---|---|---|---|---|---|---|---|---|---|---|---|---|---|---|---|---|---|---|---|---|
| 1978 | Olympus Cameras with Hesketh Racing | Hesketh 308E | Ford V8 | ARG | BRA | RSA | USW; DNPQ | MON; DNPQ | BEL; DNQ | ESP | SWE | | | | | | | | | 19th | 1 |
| 1978 | Team Tissot Ensign | Ensign N177 | Ford V8 | | | | | | | | | FRA; DNQ | GBR; Ret | GER | AUT; DSQ | NED; Ret | ITA; 10 | USA; 8 | CAN; 6 | 19th | 1 |
| 1979 | Team Ensign | Ensign N177 | Ford V8 | ARG; 11 | BRA; 13 | | | ESP; DNQ | BEL; DNQ | | | | | | | | | | | NC | 0 |
| 1979 | Team Ensign | Ensign N179 | Ford V8 | | | RSA; DNQ | USW; Ret | | | MON; DNQ | FRA | GBR | GER | | | | | | | NC | 0 |
| 1979 | Candy Tyrrell Team | Tyrrell 009 | Ford V8 | | | | | | | | | | | AUT; 8 | NED | ITA | CAN; Ret | USA; Ret | | NC | 0 |
| 1980 | Candy Tyrrell Team | Tyrrell 009 | Ford V8 | ARG; 4 | BRA; 14 | RSA; Ret | | | | | | | | | | | | | | 11th | 6 |
| 1980 | Candy Tyrrell Team | Tyrrell 010 | Ford V8 | | | | USW; 8 | BEL; 9 | MON; Ret | FRA; 11 | GBR; 4 | GER; 10 | AUT; Ret | NED; Ret | ITA; Ret | CAN; Ret | USA; Ret | | | 11th | 6 |
| 1981 | March Grand Prix Team | March 811 | Ford V8 | USW; DNQ | BRA; DNQ | ARG; DNQ | SMR; DNQ | BEL; DNQ | MON; DNPQ | | | | | | | | | | | NC | 0 |
| 1981 | Guinness RIzla+. March | March 811 | Ford V8 | | | | | | | ESP; 16 | FRA; Ret | GBR; 7 | GER; Ret | AUT; 11 | NED; Ret | ITA; Ret | CAN; 8 | CPL; DNQ | | NC | 0 |
| 1982 | Theodore Racing Team | Theodore TY01 | Ford V8 | RSA; 14 | | | | | | | | | | | | | | | | 13th | 8 |
| 1982 | Theodore Racing Team | Theodore TY02 | Ford V8 | | BRA; Ret | USW; Ret | SMR | | | | | | | | | | | | | 13th | 8 |
| 1982 | TAG Williams Team | Williams FW08 | Ford V8 | | | | | BEL; Ret | MON; 6† | DET; 5 | CAN; 7† | NED; 5 | GBR; 5 | FRA; 7 | GER; Ret | AUT; Ret | SUI; 9 | ITA; Ret | CPL; 6 | 13th | 8 |

=== CART results ===
| Year | Team | No. | Chassis | Engine | 1 | 2 | 3 | 4 | 5 | 6 | 7 | 8 | 9 | 10 | 11 | 12 | 13 | 14 | 15 | 16 | 17 | Rank | Points | Ref |
|---|---|---|---|---|---|---|---|---|---|---|---|---|---|---|---|---|---|---|---|---|---|---|---|---|
| 1982 | Wysard Racing | 34 | March 82C | Ford Cosworth DFX | PHX | ATL | MIL | CLE | MIS | MIL | POC | RIV | ROA | MIS2 | PHX2; 25 | | | | | | | NC | 0 | |
| 1983 | Wysard Racing | 34 | March 82C | Ford Cosworth DFX | ATL; 22 | | | | | | | | | | | | | | | | | 27th | 4 | |
| 1983 | Wysard Racing | 34 | March 83C | Ford Cosworth DFX | | INDY; 19 | MIL | CLE | MIS | | | | | | | | | | | | | 27th | 4 | |
| 1983 | Provimi Racing | 90 | March 82/83C | Ford Cosworth DFX | | | | | | ROA; 9 | POC | RIV | MDO; 22 | MIS2 | LVG; 18 | LS; 23 | PHX; 22 | | | | | 27th | 4 | |
| 1984 | Provimi Racing | 17 | March 84C | Ford Cosworth DFX | LBH; 7 | PHX; 15 | INDY; 27 | MIL | POR; 4 | MEA; 19 | CLE; 6 | MIS; 17 | ROA; 18 | POC | MDO; 18 | SAN; 21 | MIS2; 21 | PHX2 | LS | LVG | | 19th | 26 | |
| 1985 | Tom Hess Racing | 29 | Lola T900 | Ford Cosworth DFX | LBH | INDY; 12 | MIL | POR | MEA | CLE | MIS | ROA | POC | MDO | SAN | MIS2 | LS | PHX | MIA | | | 40th | 1 | |
| 1986 | Team Menard | | March 86C | Ford Cosworth DFX | PHX | LBH | INDY; DNQ | MIL | POR | MEA | CLE | TOR | MIS | POC | | | | | | | | 23rd | 11 | |
| 1986 | Curb Motorsports | 66 | March 86C | Ford Cosworth DFX | | | | | | | | | | | MDO; 6 | SAN; 10 | MIS2 | ROA; 13 | LS | PHX2 | MIA | 23rd | 11 | |
| 1987 | Pace Racing | 10 | March 87C | Buick V6 (t/c) | LBH | PHX | INDY; 15 | | | | | | | | | | | | | | | 15th | 27 | |
| 1987 | Raynor Motorsports | 10 | Lola T87/00 | Ford Cosworth DFX | | | | MIL; 3 | POR; 15 | MEA; 9 | CLE; 11 | TOR; 16 | MIS; 24 | POC; 10 | ROA; 26 | MDO; 9 | NAZ; 16 | LS; 14 | MIA; 22 | | | 15th | 27 | |
| 1988 | Raynor Motorsports | 10 | Lola T88/00 | Ford Cosworth DFX | PHX; 13 | LBH; 5 | INDY; 29 | MIL; 11 | POR; 19 | CLE; 6 | TOR; 23 | MEA; 24 | MIS; 16 | POC; 4 | MDO; 9 | ROA; 6 | NAZ; 10 | LS; 7 | MIA; 23 | | | 9th | 53 | |
| 1989 | Raynor Motorsports | 10 | Lola T89/00 | Judd AV | PHX; 12 | LBH; 9 | INDY; 15 | MIL; 21 | DET; 25 | POR; 11 | CLE; 22 | MEA; 25 | TOR; 16 | MIS; 5 | POC; 24 | MDO; 9 | ROA; 27 | NAZ; 9 | LS; 18 | | | 12th | 25 | |

=== 24 Hours of Le Mans results ===
| Year | Team | Co-Drivers | Car | Class | Laps | Pos. | Class Pos. |
|---|---|---|---|---|---|---|---|
| 1988 | (United Kingdom) Silk Cut Jaguar (United Kingdom) Tom Walkinshaw Racing | (United States) Kevin Cogan (Australia) Larry Perkins | Jaguar XJR-9LM | C1 | 383 | 4th | 4th |
| 1989 | (United Kingdom) Silk Cut Jaguar (United Kingdom) Tom Walkinshaw Racing | (United States) Davy Jones (United States) Jeff Kline | Jaguar XJR-9LM | C1 | 85 | DNF | DNF |
| 1990 | (United States) Nissan Performance Technology Inc. | (Australia) Geoff Brabham (United States) Chip Robinson | Nissan R90CK | C1 | 251 | DNF | DNF |

=== 12 Hours of Sebring results ===
| Year | Team | Co-Drivers | Car | Class | Laps | Pos. | Class Pos. |
|---|---|---|---|---|---|---|---|
| 1990 | (United States) Nissan Performance Technology | (United States) Bob Earl | Nissan GTP ZX-Turbo | GTP | 301 | **1st** | **1st** |
| 1991 | (United States) Nissan Performance Technology | (Australia) Geoff Brabham (Australia) Gary Brabham | Nissan NPT-90 | GTP | 298 | **1st** | **1st** |

Sporting positions
| Preceded by Geoff Lees | Formula Ford Festival; Winner; 1976 | Succeeded by Chico Serra |
| Preceded by Rupert Keegan | British Formula 3 Championship; BARC Series Champion; 1977 | Succeeded by Nelson Piquet |
