= Yip Hon =

Macau businessman (1904–1997)

Yip Hon (simplified Chinese: 叶汉; traditional Chinese: 葉漢; pinyin: Yè Hàn; Jyutping: Yip6 Hon3) (1904 – 7 May 1997) was a gambling tycoon in South China. His wealth was estimated to be HK$ 100 million. In his childhood, he stayed in Kong Mun of Guangdong, and usually participated in gambling with his pocket money. He was nicknamed Kwai Wong (鬼王) (translated as Ghost King).

In his adulthood, he was in Macau, working for a casino of gambling tycoon Fu Lo Yung (傅老榕). He helped to crack down Teng Sik Tong (聽骰黨), a gang of gamblers, who won by listening dice. After the crackdown, he became famous, and went to Shanghai. He gained a great sum of wealth in the casinos there, by his technique in listening dice, and then opened his own casino.

He closed his business in Shanghai, and returned to Macau when the Second Sino-Japanese War broke out. He soon got a casino license in Macau, and cooperated with Stanley Ho, Teddy Yip and Henry Fok to form Casino Lisboa. He later left the company, after arguments over shares and the business. He then started a chariot racing business, which was unsuccessful. In 1988, he pioneered a gambling business in international waters, by purchasing a cargo converted cruise ship named Princess of the Orient, and later selling it off for the 港龍星 which was bigger and solely a cruise ship to begin with. He gained initial success, but was unable to deal with a large number of competitors later. He subsequently sold his business to Heung's Brothers.

A story about him circulated in the mid-1980s, on gambling in Las Vegas in the United States. He supposedly played for 32 hours continuously, involving more than 3,800 rounds of baccarat. He ended up losing US$2 million. The owner of the casino offered him a Rolls-Royce if he could win back a million. Two days after, he won US$3 million and the car from the casino.

== Death ==
Yip Hon suffered a heart attack, and died on 7 May 1997, at the age of 93, while poring over a horse-racing newsletter.

== See also ==
- Gambling in Macau
