= 1977 British Formula Three season =

Seasons
- ← 1976 1978 →

The 1977 British Formula Three season was the 27th season of the British Formula Three season. Derek Daly took the B.A.R.C. BP Super Visco British Formula 3 Championship, while Stephen South took the B.R.D.C. Vandervell British Formula 3 Championship.

The success of the European Championship, now in its third season, stole some of the limelight from the British championships in 1977 and the continuing divide between the BP-sponsored BARC title and the Vandervell-sponsored BRDC title cannot have helped.

South started the season in dominant form in the March 763-Toyota he had raced in the previous year and led both championships into July. After wrecking the 763 in an accident with Len Cooke he moved over to a March 773-Toyota and the BP series turned into a three-way fight with Daly and Cooke. Daly led into the final round and clinched the title by winning after his rivals dropped out. South's consolation was the Vandervell title. Both drivers moved into F2 for 1978 but only Daly was able to secure a proper budget.

== B.A.R.C. BP Super Visco British F3 Championship ==
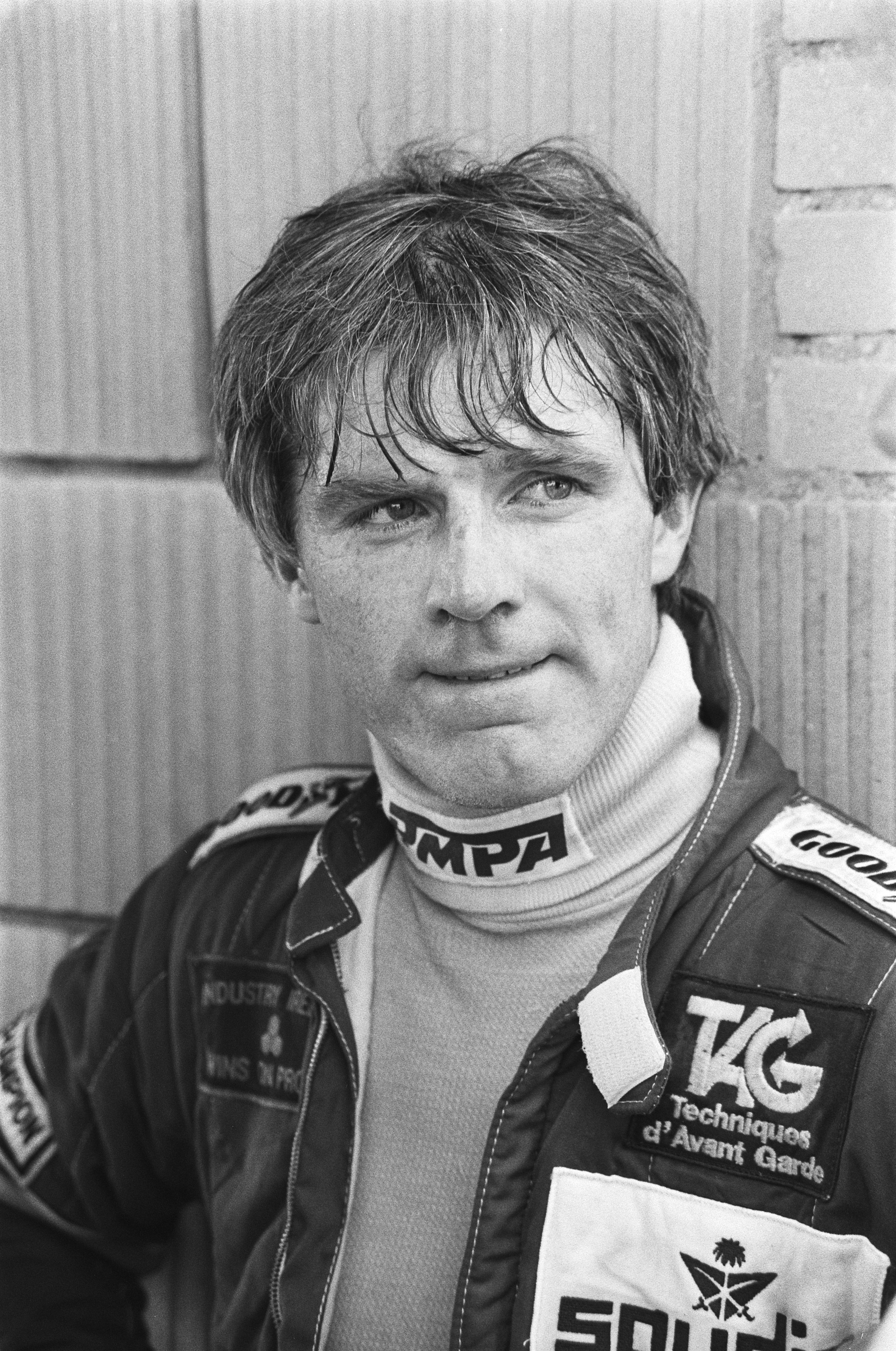
B.A.R.C. BP Super Visco British F3 champion, Derek Daly

Champion: (Republic of Ireland) Derek Daly

Joint Runner Up: (United Kingdom) Stephen South and (Sweden) Eje Elgh

=== Results ===
Date	Round	Circuit	Winning driver	Winning team	Winning car
13/03/1977	Rd.1	(United Kingdom) Thruxton	(United Kingdom) Stephen South	Stephen South/Team BP	March 763-Toyota
26/03/1977	Rd.2	(United Kingdom) Oulton Park (short)	(Sweden) Eje Elgh	Chevron Racing Team	Chevron B38-Toyota
03/04/1977	Rd.3	(United Kingdom) Silverstone (Club)	(United Kingdom) Ian Taylor	Unipart Racing Team	March 773-Triumph
11/04/1977	Rd.4	(United Kingdom) Thruxton	(Sweden) Eje Elgh	Chevron Racing Team	Chevron B38-Toyota
24/04/1977	Rd.5	(Belgium) Zolder	(Italy) Piercarlo Ghinzani	AFMP Euroracing with March	March 773-Toyota
21/05/1977	Rd.6	Monaco	(France) Didier Pironi	Écurie Elf	Martini Mk21-Toyota
29/05/1977	Rd.7	(United Kingdom) Brands Hatch (Club)	(United Kingdom) Stephen South	Team BP	March 763-Toyota
07/06/1977	Rd.8	(United Kingdom) Donington Park	(Australia) Geoff Brabham	Brabham Racing Organisation	Ralt RT1-Toyota
19/06/1977	Rd.9	(United Kingdom) Thruxton	(United Kingdom) Geoff Lees	Chevron Racing Team	Chevron B38-Toyota
10/07/1977	Rd.10	(United Kingdom) Cadwell Park	(United States) James King	March Racing Ltd	March 773-Toyota
31/07/1977	Rd.11	(United Kingdom) Donington Park	(Sweden) Eje Elgh	Chevron Racing Team	Chevron B38-Toyota
07/08/1977	Rd.12	(United Kingdom) Snetterton	(United Kingdom) Stephen South	Team BP	March 763-Toyota
11/09/1977	Rd.13	(United Kingdom) Brands Hatch (Club)	(Republic of Ireland) Derek Daly	Derek McMahon Racing	Chevron B38-Toyota
25/09/1977	Rd.14	(United Kingdom) Mallory Park	(Republic of Ireland) Derek Daly	Derek McMahon Racing	Chevron B38-Toyota
16/10/1977	Rd.15	(United Kingdom) Donington Park	(Republic of Ireland) Derek Daly	Derek McMahon Racing	Chevron B38-Toyota
30/10/1977	Rd.16	(United Kingdom) Thruxton	(Republic of Ireland) Derek Daly	Derek McMahon Racing	Chevron B38-Toyota

=== Table ===
Place	Driver	Entrant	Car	Total
1	(Republic of Ireland) Derek Daly	Derek McMahon Racing	Chevron B38-Toyota	69
2	(United Kingdom) Stephen South	Team BP	March 763-Toyota; March 773-Toyota	56
2	(Sweden) Eje Elgh	Chevron Racing Team	Chevron B38-Toyota	56
4	(United Kingdom) Geoff Lees	Chevron Racing Team	Chevron B38-Toyota	41
5	(United Kingdom) Derek Warwick	Warwick Trailers	Chevron B38-Toyota; Ralt RT1-Toyota	40
6	(United States) James King	March Racing Ltd	March 773-Toyota	22
7	(New Zealand) Brett Riley	AFMP Euroracing with March	March 773-Toyota	16
8	(United Kingdom) Ian Taylor	Unipart Racing Team	March 773-Triumph	11
9	(Italy) Piercarlo Ghinzani	AFMP Euroracing with March	March 773-Toyota	9
9	(France) Didier Pironi	Écurie Elf	Martini Mk21-Toyota	9
9	(United Kingdom) Tiff Needell	Unipart Racing Team	March 773-Triumph	9
12	(Italy) Elio de Angelis	Trivallato Racing Team; Elio de Angelis	Chevron B38-Toyota; Ralt RT1-Toyota	8
13	(Denmark) Thorkild Thyrring	Chevron Racing Team	Chevron B38-Toyota	7
13	(United Kingdom) Ian Flux	Ockley Team Racing	Ralt RT1-Toyota	7
15	(Brazil) Mario Ferraris	March Racing Ltd	March 773-Toyota	6
15	(Italy) Piero Necchi	Trivallato Racing Team; Astra Racing Team	Chevron B38-Toyota; Ralt RT1-Toyota	6
17	(Republic of Ireland) David Kennedy	Anglia Cars Ltd	Argo JM1-Toyota	4
17	(Sweden) Anders Olofsson	Puss o Kram Jeamns Racing	Ralt RT1-Toyota	4
19	(Brazil) Aryon Cornelsen-Filho	March Racing Ltd	March 773-Toyota	3
19	(France) Patrick Gaillard	Patrick Gaillard	Chevron B38-Toyota	3
19	(Sweden) Stefan Johansson	Anglia Cars Ltd	Argo JM1-Toyota	3
22	(Australia) Paul Bernasconi	Paul Bernasconi	Ralt RT1-Toyota	2
22	(United Kingdom) Don Farthing	Don Farthing Racing	Ralt RT1-Toyota	2
24	(Italy) Gianfranco Brancatelli	Scuderia Everest	Ralt RT1-Toyota	1
24	(United Kingdom) John Bright	Bob Gerard Racing	Wheatcroft R18-Toyota	1
24	(United Kingdom) Ian Grob	Alan Docking Racing	Chevron B38-Toyota	1
24	(Brazil) Mario Pati	Automovel Club Paulista; AFMP Euroracing with March	Ralt RT1-Toyota; March 773-Toyota	1
24	(Italy) Oscar Pedersoli	Scuderia Gulf Rondini	Ralt RT1-Toyota	1

== B.R.D.C. Vandervell British F3 Championship ==
Champion: (United Kingdom) Stephen South

Runner Up: (New Zealand) Brett Riley

=== Results ===
Date	Round	Circuit	Winning driver	Winning team	Winning car
06/03/1977	Rd.1	(United Kingdom) Silverstone	(United Kingdom) Stephen South	Team BP	March 763-Toyota
01/05/1977	Rd.2	(United Kingdom) Brands Hatch	(United Kingdom) Stephen South	Team BP	March 763-Toyota
06/06/1977	Rd.3	(United Kingdom) Silverstone (Club)	(Australia) Geoff Brabham	Brabham Racing Organisation	Ralt RT1-Toyota
16/07/1977	Rd.4	(United Kingdom) Silverstone	(Sweden) Anders Olofsson	Puss o Kram Jeans Racing	Ralt RT1-Toyota
27/08/1977	Rd.5	(United Kingdom) Donington Park	(New Zealand) Brett Riley	David Price Racing	March 773-Toyota
29/08/1977	Rd.6	(United Kingdom) Silverstone (Club)	(Italy) Beppe Gabbiani	Trivellato Racing Team	Chevron B38-Toyota
01/10/1977	Rd.7	(United Kingdom) Silverstone	(New Zealand) Brett Riley	David Price Racing	March 773-Toyota

=== Table ===
Place	Driver	Entrant	Car	Total
1	(United Kingdom) Stephen South	Team BP	March 763-Toyota; March 773-Toyota	75
2	(New Zealand) Brett Riley	AFMP Euroracing with March	March 773-Toyota	58
3	(United Kingdom) Derek Warwick	Warwick Trailers	Ralt RT1-Toyota; Chevron B38-Toyota	41
4	(Australia) Geoff Brabham	Brabham Racing Organisation	Ralt RT1-Toyota	36
5	(Sweden) Eje Elgh	Chevron Racing Team	Chevron B38-Toyota	34
5	(Republic of Ireland) Derek Daly	Derek McMahon Racing	Chevron B38-Toyota	34
7	(Brazil) Nelson Piquet	Scuderia Mirabella Mille Miglia	March 773-Toyota; Ralt RT1-Toyota	32
8	(Italy) Beppe Gabbiani	Trivellato Racing Team	Chevron B38-Toyota	30
9	(United Kingdom) Ian Taylor	Unipart Racing Team	March 773-Triumph	26
10	(United Kingdom) Geoff Lees	Chevron Racing Team	Chevron B38-Toyota	24
11	(Sweden) Anders Olofsson	Puss o Kram Jeans Racing	Ralt RT1-Toyota	23
11	(United Kingdom) Tiff Needell	Unipart Racing Team	March 773-Triumph	23
13	(France) Patrick Gaillard	Patrick Gaillard	Chevron B38-Toyota	21
14	(United Kingdom) Ian Flux	Ockley Team Racing	Ralt RT1-Toyota	19
15	(Italy) Elio de Angelis	Elio de Angelis; Trivellato Racing Team	Ralt RT1-Toyota; Chevron B38-Toyota	15
16	(United Kingdom) Ian Grob	Alan Docking Racing	Chevron B38-Toyota	14
17	(Italy) Piercarlo Ghinzani	AFMP Euroracing with March	March 773-Toyota	10
17	(United Kingdom) Nigel Mansell	Alan McKechnie Racing	Puma 377-Toyota; Lola T570-Toyota	10
17	(Brazil) Mario Pati	Automovel Club Paulista; AFMP Euroracing with March	Ralt RT1-Toyota; March 773-Toyota	10
20	(United Kingdom) Jan Seymour	City Speed Racing	March 763-Toyota	8
20	(West Germany) Bertram Schäfer	Klaus Zimmermann Racing Team	Ralt RT1-Toyota	8
22	(France) Philippe Colonna	Alan Docking Racing	Chevron B38-Toyota	6
22	(United States) Danny Sullivan	Anglia Cars Ltd	Argo JM1-Toyota	6
24	(United States) James King	March Racing Ltd	March-Toyota 773	4
25	(United Kingdom) John Bright	Bob Gerard Racing	Wheatcroft R18-Toyota	3
25	(Belgium) Pierre Dieudonné	Dr. Joseph Ehrlich	Ehrlich ES6-Toyota; Ehrlich RP3-Toyota	3
25	(Australia) Chris Farrell	Chris Farrell	Chevron B38-Toyota	3
28	(United Kingdom) John Stokes	Bogarts of Birmingham	Chevron B38-Toyota	2
28	(Denmark) Thorkild Thyrring	Chevron Racing Team	Chevron B38-Toyota	2
30	(Netherlands) Jan Lammers	Hawke Racing Team; Racing Team Holland	Hawke DL18-Toyota; Ralt RT1-Toyota	1

== Non-Championship Races ==
=== Results ===
Date	Race	Circuit	Winning driver	Winning team	Winning car
08/07/1977	Donington Trophy	(United Kingdom) Donington Park	(United Kingdom) John Bright	Bob Gerard Racing	Wheatcroft R18-Toyota
04/09/1977	B.R.S.C.C. Trophy	(United Kingdom) Mallory Park	(United Kingdom) Stephen South	Team BP	March 763-Toyota
13/11/1977	Gone in 60seconds Formula 3 Trophy	(United Kingdom) Thruxton	(Republic of Ireland) Derek Daly	Derek McMahon Racing	Chevron B38-Toyota
