= Gimax =

Italian racing driver (1938–2021)

Carlo Franchi "Gimax"
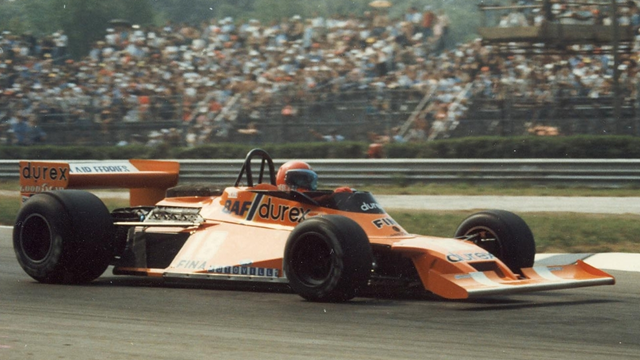
- "Gimax" at 1978 Italian Grand Prix
- Born: 1 January 1938; Milan, Italy
- Died: 13 January 2021 (aged 83)

Formula One World Championship career
- Nationality: (Italy) Italian
- Active years: 1978
- Team: Surtees
- Entries: 1 (0 starts)
- Championships: 0
- Wins: 0
- Podiums: 0
- Career points: 0
- Pole positions: 0
- Fastest laps: 0
- First entry: 1978 Italian Grand Prix

"Gimax", pseudonym of Carlo Franchi (1 January 1938 – 13 January 2021) was an Italian racing driver. He never raced under his real name, and his son has also raced using the name "Gimax".

He entered one World Championship Formula One Grand Prix with Surtees, the 1978 Italian Grand Prix, but failed to qualify. He also participated in one non-Championship Formula One race, the 1979 Dino Ferrari Grand Prix.

== Sportscars ==
"Gimax" was a regular entrant in Italian sportscar racing during the 1970s and in 1978, he also competed in European Sportscar Championship, a series set up for that season in order to allow Group 6 prototypes to continue to compete in Europe for their own championship after the cancellation of the World Sports Car Championship.

The series was separated into two categories, one for the 2-Litre cars and the other for the larger capacity cars: "Gimax" won the 2-litre drivers' championship in an Osella, while Porsche driver Reinhold Joest won the Drivers' Championship for the larger capacity cars.

== Complete Formula One World Championship results ==
(key)

Year	Entrant	Chassis	Engine	1	2	3	4	5	6	7	8	9	10	11	12	13	14	15	16	WDC	Points
1978	Team Surtees	Surtees TS20	Cosworth V8	ARG	BRA	RSA	USW	MON	BEL	ESP	SWE	FRA	GBR	GER	AUT	NED	ITA; DNQ	USA	CAN	NC	0
