= 1979 Race of Champions =

- Non-championship race in the 1979 Formula One season

Race details
- Date: 15 April 1979
- Location: Brands Hatch Grand Prix Circuit, Fawkham, Kent, England
- Course: Permanent racing facility
- Course length: 4.206 km (2.6136 miles)
- Distance: 40 laps, 168.24 km (104.544 miles)
- Weather: Warm, dry

Pole position
Driver	(United States) Mario Andretti	Lotus-Ford
- Time: 1:17.52

Fastest lap
Driver	(Brazil) Nelson Piquet	Brabham-Alfa Romeo
- Time: 1:17.46

Podium
First	(Canada) Gilles Villeneuve	Ferrari
Second	(Brazil) Nelson Piquet	Brabham-Alfa Romeo
Third	(United States) Mario Andretti	Lotus-Ford

The 1979 Race of Champions was a Formula One non-championship motor race held at Brands Hatch, United Kingdom on 15 April 1979. The field was made up of seven Formula One cars that competed in the World championship while the rest of the field usually competed in the Aurora series.

== Race summary ==
Brabham had brought two brand new BT48s onto the circuit. Another new car introduced was the Lotus 80, but Mario Andretti only used it in qualifying. Ferrari's Gilles Villeneuve drove a slightly modified 1978 Ferrari 312 T3 instead of the new 312 T4.

At the start Niki Lauda got away well from the front row and quickly pulled a lead of a few seconds, while the pole sitter Mario Andretti was dropped down to third. Gilles Villeneuve was second, followed closely by Andretti and Nelson Piquet. By lap eight the chasing three drivers had caught Lauda and they were going nose to tail. But that didn't last for long, as Lauda had to pit at the end of the eight lap, but he was able to rejoin rather quickly. Villeneuve took over the lead, only to lose it a few laps later as he ran wide at the exit of Hawthorn corner. Andretti moved into the lead in his Lotus 79. On lap 11 Piquet was also forced to pit in, so the leading battle was between Andretti and Villeneuve, while Jochen Mass in the Arrows had taken advantage of the pitstops and moved up to third place.

The positions in the front of the field remained the same for the next 12 laps. Andretti's lead was up to four seconds after Villeneuve's mistake, but the Canadian closed the gap slowly but surely. By lap 26 Villeneuve was all over the back of Andretti and a few laps later took the inside line into Paddock Hill bend and retook the lead. Andretti had no answer to Villeneuve's pace and the gap increased rapidly. Piquet had moved ahead of Mass into third and his team mate Lauda, who had pitted twice, was fifth. A few laps from the end Piquet overtook the slowing Andretti as well. But in the end it was Villeneuve who crossed the line first, lapping everyone up to the fourth place man.

== Classification ==
=== Qualifying ===
Pos.	No.	Driver	Constructor	Time	Gap
1	1	(United States) Mario Andretti	Lotus-Ford	1:17.52	—
2	5	(Austria) Niki Lauda	Brabham-Alfa Romeo	1:17.76	+0.24
3	12	(Canada) Gilles Villeneuve	Ferrari	1:17.85	+0.33
4	6	(Brazil) Nelson Piquet	Brabham-Alfa Romeo	1:17.98	+0.46
5	30	(West Germany) Jochen Mass	Arrows-Ford	1:18.93	+1.41
6	18	(Italy) Elio de Angelis	Shadow-Ford	1:19.57	+2.05
7	7	(United Kingdom) John Watson	McLaren-Ford	1:20.30	+2.78
8	56	(United Kingdom) Rupert Keegan	Arrows-Ford	1:20.65	+3.13
9	41	(South Africa) Desiré Wilson	Tyrrell-Ford	1:20.80	+3.28
10	44	(United Kingdom) Guy Edwards	Fittipaldi-Ford	1:20.90	+3.38
11	43	(Spain) Emilio de Villota	Lotus-Ford	1:21.67	+4.15
12	51	(Republic of Ireland) David Kennedy	Wolf-Ford	1:22.35	+4.83
13	52	(United Kingdom) Philip Bullman	Surtees-Ford	1:22.41	+4.89
14	46	(United Kingdom) Tiff Needell	Chevron-Ford	1:22.50	+4.98
15	49	(Italy) Giacomo Agostini	Williams-Ford	1:22.60	+5.08
16	42	(United States) Gordon Smiley	Tyrrell-Ford	1:23.20	+5.68
17	45	(Belgium) Bernard de Dryver	Fittipaldi-Ford	1:23.44	+5.92
18	47	(United Kingdom) Val Musetti	March-Ford	1:25.61	+8.09
19	63	(United Kingdom) Robin Smith	Ensign-Ford	1:26.37	+8.85
DNQ	62	(Austria) Gerd Biechteler	March-Ford	-	-

- A bright yellow background represents as Aurora AFX British F1 cars.

== Race ==
Pos.	Driver	Constructor	Laps	Time/Retired	Grid
1	(Canada) Gilles Villeneuve	Ferrari	40	53:17.12	3
2	(Brazil) Nelson Piquet	Brabham-Alfa Romeo	40	+ 14.07	4
3	(United States) Mario Andretti	Lotus-Ford	40	+ 23.17	1
4	(West Germany) Jochen Mass	Arrows-Ford	40	+ 40.76	5
5	(Austria) Niki Lauda	Brabham-Alfa Romeo	39	+ 1 Lap	2
6	(Italy) Elio de Angelis	Shadow-Ford	39	+ 1 Lap	6
7	(United Kingdom) Guy Edwards	Fittipaldi-Ford	39	+ 1 Lap	11
8	(Belgium) Bernard de Dryver	Fittipaldi-Ford	38	+ 2 Laps	18
9	(South Africa) Desiré Wilson	Tyrrell-Ford	38	+ 2 Laps	10
10	(United States) Gordon Smiley	Tyrrell-Ford	38	+ 2 Laps	17
11	(Italy) Giacomo Agostini	Williams-Ford	38	+ 2 Laps	16
12	(United Kingdom) Val Musetti	March-Ford	36	+ 4 Laps	19
13	(United Kingdom) Robin Smith	Ensign-Ford	36	+ 4 Laps	20
Ret	(United Kingdom) Rupert Keegan	Arrows-Ford	35	Engine	9
Ret	(Spain) Emilio de Villota	Lotus-Ford	34	Engine	12
Ret	(United Kingdom) Philip Bullman	Surtees-Ford	24	Spun off	14
Ret	(United Kingdom) John Watson	McLaren-Ford	18	Gearbox	7
Ret	(United Kingdom) Tiff Needell	Chevron-Ford	16	Accident	15
DNS	(Republic of Ireland) David Kennedy	Wolf-Ford		Gearbox	13
DNQ	(Austria) Gerd Biechteler	March-Ford			

== Notes ==
- Pole position: Mario Andretti – 1:17.52
- Fastest lap: Nelson Piquet – 1:17.46

Previous race: 1978 BRDC International Trophy	Formula One non-championship races 1979 season	Next race: 1979 Dino Ferrari Grand Prix
Previous race: 1977 Race of Champions	Race of Champions	Next race: 1983 Race of Champions
