= 1977 B.R.S.C.C. Trophy =

Formula Three race

The 1977 B.R.S.C.C. Trophy was a non-championship Formula Three race, held at the Mallory Park circuit, in Leicestershire, England, on 4 September. The race saw Stephen South, who won the previous year's corresponding race (Griffin Golden Helmet Trophy), return to win again.

== Report ==
=== Entry ===
A total of just 17 F3 cars were entered for the event. However, of those, only 11 took part in qualifying and the race. Those that were entered but did not arrive included both the Unipart Racing Team's cars and a car that would have been driven by English driver, Nigel Mansell.

=== Qualifying ===
Stephen South took pole position, with a time of 44.2 secs.

=== Race ===
After 20 laps of the Mallory Park circuit, South took the chequered flag, in a time of 15:07.0 mins. averaging a speed of 107.166 mph. Second place went to Mario Pati, who was over 28 secs. behind. Just 0.2 of second separate Pati from Ian Grob who completed the podium. The race however saw four taken out following a startline crash, leaving just seven cars running after Gerard's, the first corner.

== Classification ==
=== Race ===
Pos.	No.	Driver	Entrant	Car – Engine	Time, Laps	Reason Out
1st	12	(United Kingdom) Stephen South	Team BP	March-Toyota 763	15:07.0	
2nd	11	(Brazil) Mario Pati	Automovel Club Paulista	Ralt-Toyota RT1	15:35.2	
3rd	24	(United Kingdom) Ian Grob	Alan Docking Racing	Chevron-Toyota B38	15:35.4	
4th	26	(Australia) Chris Farrell	Chris Farrell	Chevron-Toyota B38	15:35.6	
5th	33	(Belgium) Pierre Dieudonné	Dr. Joseph Ehrlich	Ehrlich-Toyota RP9	15:52.6	
6th	44	(United Kingdom) Wyatt Stanley	Wyatt Stanley	March-Toyota 753	18	
DNF	23	(France) Patrick Gaillard	Patrick Gaillard	Chevron-Toyota B38	2	Accident damage
DNF	3	(United Kingdom) Derek Warwick	Warwick Trailers	Ralt-Toyota RT1	0	Startline crash
DNF	27	(United Kingdom) Ian Flux	Ockley Team Racing	Ralt-Toyota RT1	0	Startline crash
DNF	42	(Australia) Paul Bernasconi	Paul Bernasconi	Ralt-Toyota RT1	0	Startline crash
DNF	40	(United Kingdom) John Bright	Bob Gerard Racing	Wheatcroft-Toyota R18	0	Startline crash

- Fastest lap: Stephen South, 44.6secs (108.96 mph).
