= Teddy Yip Jr. =

American racing driver (born 1983)

Teddy Yip Jr. (Chinese: 小葉德利) (born in La Jolla, California on 30 May 1982) is the son of Macau-based Indonesian businessman Teddy Yip Sr. He is the team principal of SJM Theodore Racing Team.

Teddy Yip Sr. was attending the 1982 Indianapolis 500 when Teddy Yip Jr. was born. He has six half-siblings. His mother, Beverly Clark, is from Nova Scotia. He grew up in Hong Kong and London. As a child, Teddy was being groomed to be a lawyer or a doctor. He did some karting at 10 but by his own admission was not a fast racer. In 2001, he visited friends in Victoria, British Columbia, loved the city and decided to base himself in Oak Bay. Yip ran a fitness studio and a spa, and dabbled in real estate in both Victoria and Vancouver. In 2008, he received a call from one of his dad’s old racing buddies, asking him to get involved in the Status Grand Prix team. Yip Jr. has served as Team Principal of Status Grand Prix which competed in A1GP, GP2 and GP3. In October 2014, He bought GP2 outfit Caterham Racing from Malaysian aviation entrepreneur Tony Fernandes and relocated it to Silverstone to merge with Status Grand Prix.

In 2013, he revived the Theodore name at the 2013 Macau Grand Prix; this idea came from Dr. Philip Newsome, the author of the biography of "Teddy Yip - From Macau to the World and back," for the 30th anniversary of Ayrton Senna's triumph at the former Portuguese enclave. Alex Lynn and Lucas Auer's cars were entered under the Theodore Racing by Prema banner. "Macau is an extremely important part of the Yip family history, and my father always wanted to play his part in helping out young drivers on the way to the top," said Yip. After Alex Lynn won the race, Yip Jr. said, "This was a fairy tale way for the Theodore name to return to the great Macau Grand Prix in its anniversary year. To be with SJM (Sociedade de Jogos de Macau) to witness Alex's victory is an emotional day, and a fitting tribute to my father's contribution to this great Macau event."

In 2016, Theodore Racing made another big step by heralding their return to the IndyCar Series, partnered with Graham Rahal, another one of Teddy Yip Sr.’s passions.
