= Teddy Yip (businessman) =

Indonesian-Dutch businessman

- 葉德利
- Born: Jap Tek Lie; 2 June 1907; Medan, Dutch East Indies (now Indonesia)
- Died: 11 July 2003 (aged 96); Hong Kong

Theodore Yip Tek Lie (né Jap, Chinese: 葉德利; pinyin: Yè Délì; Jyutping: jip6 dak1 lei6; 2 June 1907 – 11 July 2003) was an Indonesian-Dutch businessman and a Formula One team owner of Theodore Racing in the 1970s. He was a polyglot.

== Early life and business career ==
Yip, an ethnic Indonesian Chinese of Hakka ancestry from Meixian, Guangdong, China was born as Jap Tek Lie (Note: Jap Tek Lie is the romanization of Chinese that was used in Indonesia) in Medan, on the island of Sumatra, Indonesia in 1907. At that time Indonesia was the Dutch East Indies, a colony of the Netherlands. Teddy Yip studied in the Netherlands and took Dutch nationality. He moved to Hong Kong in the 1940s and began to build up his business empire which included travel agencies, hotels, casinos and trading companies.

Yip spoke many languages including six Chinese variants (most notably Hakka, it being his native tongue, and Mandarin and Cantonese due to his residence in Hong Kong and Macau), Dutch (through his life experience during Dutch colonial rule and his Dutch citizenship), English, French, German, Malay (inasmuch as he was born and spent his childhood in Indonesia prior his move to the Netherlands for his studies), and Thai (which helped him expand his businesses into property and finance).

In 1962 he and several partners formed the Sociedade de Turismo e Diversões de Macau (STDM) with a monopoly to run all casino operations and many other leisure activities in Macau, including lotteries, ferries and hotels. Teddy Yip established the Casino Lisboa along with Stanley Ho (the brother of his wife Susie Ho) and their two other partners (Yip Hon and Henry Fok). The STDM transformed Macau into a major tourist destination. Yip was the force behind the Macau Grand Prix, a prestigious annual motor racing event in the streets of Macau often won by drivers who would go on to great success in Formula One.

== Motor racing ==
Yip started racing cars for fun in the 1950s. In 1974 Yip sponsored Australian driver Vern Schuppan in a Formula 5000 team managed by Sid Taylor and in Formula One with Team Ensign. In 1975 he continued to sponsor Schuppan in races in America and for 1976 supported Alan Jones in the US Formula 5000 series, also establishing his Theodore Racing, run by Taylor, who entered an Ensign in F1 with Patrick Tambay as the driver.

After a relatively unsuccessful year in 1977, Yip commissioned Ron Tauranac to build him a Formula One car. Eddie Cheever failed to qualify in both Brazil and Argentina but Keke Rosberg took the car to a shock victory at the 1978 BRDC International Trophy at Silverstone, a non-championship race that was held in extremely wet conditions that year. Rosberg qualified for only one Grand Prix that year, in South Africa.

In 1979, Yip helped to fund Ensign but the team did not score any points. At the end of 1978 and through 1979 Yip also funded a British F1 programme with Walter Wolf Racing WR3, WR4 and WR6 cars for David Kennedy who finished runner up in the series in 1979. His British F1 programme also ran Desiré Wilson in Wolf WR4 to a famous win at Brands Hatch in 1980.

Kennedy moved to Shadow in 1980 with, initially, Stefan Johansson and later Geoff Lees as team mate but the team was chronically underfunded and using a very poorly engineered DN11 chassis. After a few races Yip took over ownership from founder Don Nichols and introduced a DN12 chassis which also proved a failure. After both cars failed to qualify for the French Grand Prix in June Yip closed down the Shadow team. Yip rethought his involvement in racing and ended most of his other activities in order to concentrate on F1.

Yip then established Theodore Racing Ltd. and recruited designer Tony Southgate and team manager Jo Ramírez. A new car called the TY01 was driven by Tambay at the start of 1981. Tambay left mid-season to join Ligier and was replaced by Marc Surer. The car was developed in 1982, but with no success forthcoming, Yip merged Theodore with Ensign and ran the Ensign N183 design as a Theodore. Johnny Cecotto and Roberto Guerrero drove the car, but at the end of that season the team shut down.

For many years, Yip ran a team at the Macau Grand Prix and was behind the switch from Formula Pacific rules to Formula Three rules in 1983. The result was a huge success and Theodore Racing won the event many times, notably with Ayrton Senna in 1983.

Yip reduced his involvement in motor racing sponsorship in the late 1980s and finally sold his share of his company in Macau to his brother-in-law. His son Teddy Yip Jr. revived the Theodore Racing brand in various single seater racing formulae.

== Death ==
Teddy Yip died at the age of 96 in 2003. News of his death and the subsequent funeral received extensive coverage in television, radio and print media in Southeast Asia.

== Family ==
In January 2019, Yip's adopted son, Willy, died in a Hong Kong hospital from injuries he had received in a school bus crash in the previous month.
