= 1978 Italian Grand Prix =

Formula One motor race

- Race 14 of 16 in the 1978 Formula One season
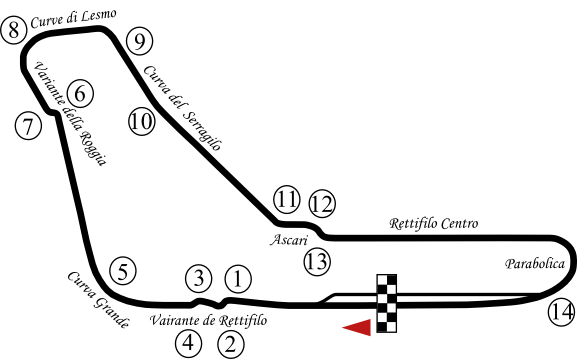

Race details
- Date: 10 September 1978
- Location: Autodromo Nazionale di Monza, Monza
- Course: Permanent racing facility
- Course length: 5.800 km (3.6 miles)
- Distance: 40 laps, 232.000 km (144 miles)
- Scheduled distance: 52 laps, 301.600 km (187.2 miles)
- Weather: Sunny

Pole position
Driver	(United States) Mario Andretti	Lotus-Ford
- Time: 1:37.520

Fastest lap
Driver	(United States) Mario Andretti	Lotus-Ford
- Time: 1:38.230 on lap 33

Podium
First	(Austria) Niki Lauda	Brabham-Alfa Romeo
Second	(United Kingdom) John Watson	Brabham-Alfa Romeo
Third	(Argentina) Carlos Reutemann	Ferrari
- Lap leaders: Mario Andretti was handed a one-minute time penalty, which cost him the victory.

The 1978 Italian Grand Prix was the 14th motor race of the 1978 Formula One season. It was held on 10 September 1978 at Monza. It was marred by the death of Ronnie Peterson following an accident at the start of the race. The race was won by Niki Lauda (Brabham-Alfa Romeo), after both Mario Andretti (Lotus-Ford) and Gilles Villeneuve (Ferrari), who had finished first and second, were given a one-minute penalty and dropped to sixth and seventh. Lauda's teammate John Watson (Brabham-Alfa Romeo) and Carlos Reutemann (Ferrari) completed the podium.

With three races remaining, Andretti led the World Drivers' Championship by 12 points from Peterson, who was his teammate. Lauda, in third place, was 28 points behind Andretti; with only 9 points for a win, he could not overtake him. Lotus also led Brabham by 33 points in the Constructors' standings. Andretti initially appealed to the penalty but, upon hearing the news of Peterson's death and having become World Champion, he dropped it. Lauda himself gave the Grand Prix trophy to Andretti. As of 2025, this marks the last race win for an Alfa Romeo-powered car. Andretti remains the last American and the second ever to win the Formula One World Championship; these also remain the final Drivers' (6) and Constructors' (7) titles won by Lotus.

== Qualifying ==
Andretti took pole position alongside Gilles Villeneuve on the front row (Ferrari), with Jean-Pierre Jabouille (Renault) in third place, Lauda in fourth, and Peterson in fifth.

=== Pre-qualifying classification ===
Pos.	Driver	Constructor	Time
1	Héctor Rebaque	Lotus-Ford	1:39.88
2	Nelson Piquet	McLaren-Ford	1:40.11
3	Brett Lunger	McLaren-Ford	1:40.24
4	Harald Ertl	Ensign-Ford	1:40.27
5	Keke Rosberg	Wolf-Ford	1:40.75
6	Rolf Stommelen	Arrows-Ford	1:40.93
7	Alberto Colombo	Merzario-Ford	1:42.55

=== Qualifying classification ===
Pos.	Driver	Constructor	Time	Grid
1	Mario Andretti	Lotus-Ford	1:37.520	1
2	Gilles Villeneuve	Ferrari	1:37.866	2
3	Jean-Pierre Jabouille	Renault	1:37.930	3
4	Niki Lauda	Brabham-Alfa Romeo	1:38.215	4
5	Ronnie Peterson	Lotus-Ford	1:38.256	5
6	Alan Jones	Williams-Ford	1:38.271	6
7	John Watson	Brabham-Alfa Romeo	1:38.610	7
8	Jacques Laffite	Ligier-Matra	1:38.917	8
9	Jody Scheckter	Wolf-Ford	1:38.937	9
10	James Hunt	McLaren-Ford	1:38.938	10
11	Carlos Reutemann	Ferrari	1:38.959	11
12	Riccardo Patrese	Arrows-Ford	1:39.179	12
13	Emerson Fittipaldi	Fittipaldi-Ford	1:39.421	13
14	Didier Pironi	Tyrrell-Ford	1:39.531	14
15	Clay Regazzoni	Shadow-Ford	1:39.621	15
16	Patrick Depailler	Tyrrell-Ford	1:39.630	16
17	Hans-Joachim Stuck	Shadow-Ford	1:39.701	17
18	Derek Daly	Ensign-Ford	1:40.075	18
19	Patrick Tambay	McLaren-Ford	1:40.163	19
20	Bruno Giacomelli	McLaren-Ford	1:40.199	20
21	Brett Lunger	McLaren-Ford	1:40.302	21
22	Arturo Merzario	Merzario-Ford	1:40.702	22
23	Vittorio Brambilla	Surtees-Ford	1:40.805	23
24	Nelson Piquet	McLaren-Ford	1:40.846	24
25	Héctor Rebaque	Lotus-Ford	1:41.063	DNQ
26	Harald Ertl	ATS-Ford	1:41.185	DNQ
27	Michael Bleekemolen	ATS-Ford	1:41.408	DNQ
28	Gimax	Surtees-Ford	1:41.677	DNQ

== Race ==
=== First start and Ronnie Peterson accident ===
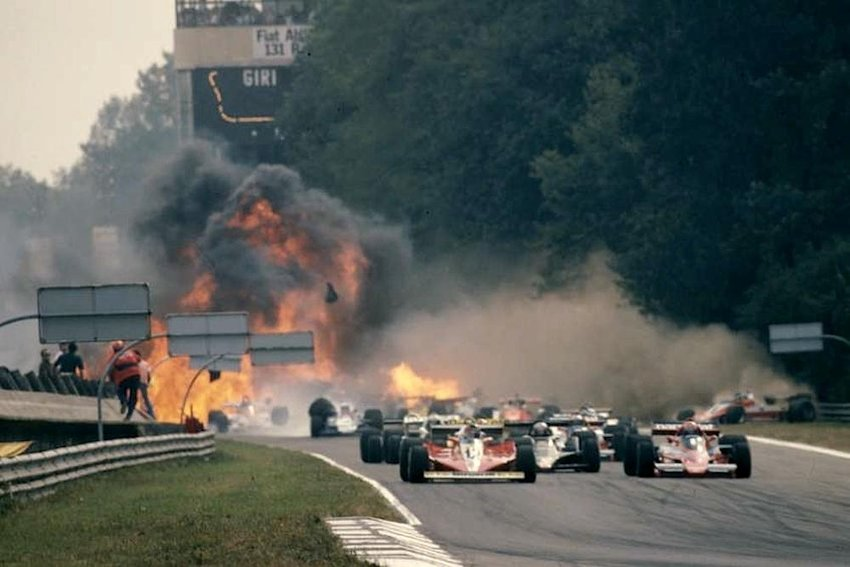
The melee at the start that killed Ronnie Peterson during the first start of the race

During the morning warmup, Ronnie Peterson had a rear brake failure, crashing his Lotus 79/3 at the Della Roggia chicane, reverting to his backup Lotus 78 for the race, which ended up as part of the controversy for the race.

The race started at 15:30 Central European Time (UTC+1). On the warm up lap, Patrick Tambay went into the pits to have his gear-change mechanism looked at. The starter Gianni Restelli was overenthusiastic turning on the green lights before all the cars had lined up, which resulted in several cars in the middle of the field getting a jump on those at the front. The result was a funneling effect of the cars approaching the chicane, and the cars were tightly bunched together with little room for maneuver. James Hunt was overtaken on the right-hand side by Riccardo Patrese, and Hunt instinctively veered left and hit the rear right wheel of Peterson's car, with Vittorio Brambilla, Hans-Joachim Stuck, Patrick Depailler, Didier Pironi, Derek Daly, Clay Regazzoni, and Brett Lunger all involved in the ensuing melee. Peterson's Lotus went into the barriers hard on the right-hand side and caught fire. He was trapped but Hunt, Regazzoni, and Depailler managed to free him from the wreck before he received more than minor burns. He was dragged free and laid in the middle of the track fully conscious but with severe leg injuries. It took twenty minutes before medical help was dispatched to the scene. Brambilla had been hit on the head by a flying wheel and rendered unconscious which resulted in a skull fracture. He was freed from his car by firefighters. Both Brambilla and Peterson were taken to the Niguarda hospital in nearby Milan via ambulance.

=== Delayed restart ===
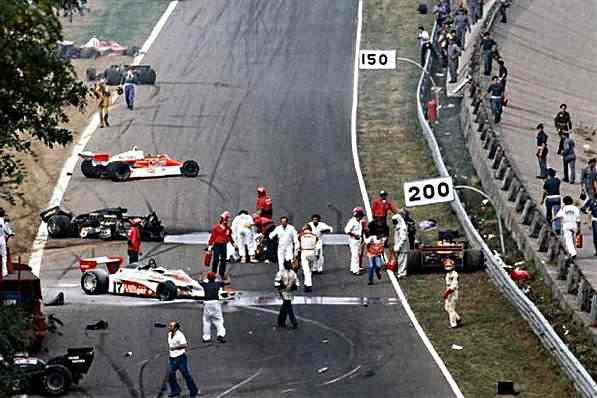
The accident scene after the flames had been extinguished

Drivers were allowed to use spare cars for the race restart. Non-starters included Peterson and Brambilla who were taken to Niguarda hospital, Stuck who was not allowed to restart due to him suffering from slight concussion after being struck on the head by a flying wheel in the startline crash, Pironi (as the Tyrrell team had one spare car and that was set up for Depailler), and Lunger who had no spare car available. During the red flag, three time world champion and ABC Sports commentator Jackie Stewart interviewed Andretti and he said "Yeah, it couldn't be worse. Seems like the width of the straightaway invites a lot of passing and dodging it going right into like a funnel and I'm really worried about Ronnie. Yeah, it hit the guardrail at such impact it just incredible, tore everything out and it's very bad". The race was due to be ready for a restart at 17:15. While driving from the pit lane to the grid, Jody Scheckter's Wolf lost a wheel and crashed at the second Lesmo curve, bending the Armco barrier that was situated right next to the track. Scheckter was unhurt and got an ambulance to return him to the pits so he could take the spare car for the restart. Some of the drivers had seen the accident, got out of their cars, and rushed across to race control to get the second start delayed as the Armco barriers were leaning over perilously where Scheckter struck it. Andretti, Hunt, Lauda, Reutemann and Emerson Fittipaldi all went to the spot where Scheckter crashed with Brabham boss and Formula One Constructors' Association president Bernie Ecclestone, FISA Medical Director Sid Watkins, Clerk of the Course, Romolo Tavoni and some officials. Upon inspection of the state of the barrier, the drivers refused to start until the barrier was repaired, causing more delay. Very little information was forthcoming and the crowds began to whistle and shout, not knowing why there was another hold-up. The barrier was later repaired and ready for the restart.

=== Second start and race recap ===
Because of the amount of time clearing up the track after the shunt in the first start and the barrier being repaired, plus Scheckter's crash prior to the second start, at 17:50 it was announced that the race would take place and the distance would be shortened from 52 laps to 40 laps to avoid sunset which was at 19:44. The race was restarted at 18:15. Prior to the restart, Jackie Stewart interviewed Andretti and he said "it's no time to feel like celebrating, it just lost its impact, there's no question about it for me. At least for now and I just it's useless to say this is at least really what I expected to happen this particular season. Everything was going so well and well not just for me, both of us Ronnie and I regardless of controversy they were trying, people were trying to build around us, I think both of us felt we had probably the best season ever". Villeneuve overtook Andretti at the restart and at the end of the lap both drivers were side by side; Villeneuve held on to the lead and they pulled away from Jabouille, who was running third with Lauda behind him. After four laps, Regazzoni in the spare Shadow went to the pit lane as he was having his brakes looked at. Jabouille had engine problems after six laps and Lauda took on the pursuit; meanwhile, race control gave Villeneuve and Andretti a one-minute penalty as they were judged to have jumped the start. Andretti took Villeneuve with only five laps remaining. With Jabouille having retired, Lauda finished third ahead of Watson (Brabham), Reutemann (Ferrari), Jacques Laffite (Ligier-Matra), and Patrick Tambay (McLaren-Ford). Since all of those finished less than a minute behind, Andretti and Villeneuve were dropped to sixth and seventh place. Andretti had won the championship but celebrations were muted due to Peterson in hospital. The race was also notable for the first finish for Nelson Piquet with a creditable ninth after dodging the Peterson wreckage in the first start.

After the race, Lotus and Ferrari lodged protests against the one-minute penalty imposed on Andretti and Villeneuve. These protests were rejected.

== Death of Ronnie Peterson ==
Peterson was admitted to the Niguarda hospital following his first-lap crash. At the hospital, Peterson's X-rays showed he had 27 fractures in both legs, according to the newly appointed Formula One doctor Sid Watkins in his 1996 autobiography Life at the Limit. It was decided that Peterson was sent to intensive care so that the surgeons could operate to stabilise the bones. Peterson's parents, May Britt and Bengt Peterson, were watching live on TV and knew he was involved in the lap-one incident. They were contacted in their home in Örebro, Sweden by Peterson's manager, Staffan Svenby, who was in Monza. Ronnie's wife Barbro was in Monaco; she was contacted by Team Lotus boss Colin Chapman an hour after the crash.

Once Peterson arrived at Niguarda hospital, Svenby was consulted by the doctors on how Peterson should be operated on and phoned Watkins, three Swedish doctors and other Italian doctors for advice. Disputes were raised regarding Peterson's treatment; the doctors would present him with three options. Peterson could either stay at the hospital in Milan or fly to another hospital where they had experience treating complicated fractures from alpine skiing accidents in countries like Austria, Switzerland, Sweden or England, wait for an operation, risking a worse result and potentially amputation, or operate on the bones at once and risk bone marrow embolism. Svenby decided Peterson would stay in the Niguarda hospital for operation, which was completed without any issue. Over the phone, professor Watkins reassured Barbro that he thought that Peterson would recover, with plans being made for her to get to Milan in the morning. By midnight the following day, Chapman and Andretti returned to their hotel in Como, while Svenby and Watkins booked a hotel near the hospital as they had already checked out from their regular hotels the morning prior.

By 04:00, Peterson, who was now unconscious, had developed breathing problems and was being ventilated by a machine in an attempt to keep his blood oxygen levels normal. An X-ray showed that he had developed multiple emboli in his lungs, which had come from the fat in the bone marrow entering his bloodstream; due to this, his kidneys had started to fail. A neurological examination showed signs of serious brain damage. Professor Watkins, inspecting Peterson's eyes, identified fat globules obstructing the small arteries in the retinas. On Watkins' suggestion, the neurosurgeon agreed to take an electroencephalogram to get the situation clear on Peterson's brain functions. However, by this point, Peterson had suffered a full kidney failure. Peterson was declared dead at 09:55.

=== Post-race reactions ===
Emerson Fittipaldi arrived together with his wife, Maria Helena, shortly thereafter Svenby, who informed them of the tragic news. Fittipaldi, who was friends with Peterson, cried profusely and said "I just can't believe it. We have been friends for so many years and now he is gone. Racing will change a lot for me. He was one of the greatest drivers and no one will replace him." Mario Andretti, also one of Peterson's friends, was on route and he said "Oh no. I wanted that title so badly, but I did not want to win it like this. What the hell shall I do with it now? I don't feel anything for it. One of my best friends is gone and motor racing will never be the same again. I was really looking forward to next year, he in the McLaren and me in the Lotus and we would have a good fight and afterwards sit down to have a beer and a good laugh about it." Peterson's first manager Sveneric Eriksson said "When Ronnie died, Sweden stopped. All was quiet. In many workplaces nothing was done during the day, people only discussed how Ronnie could die that way he did. In schools the children cried. Their great idol was gone. Some schools had to close, and the children were sent home."

As a result of the start line crash, a medical car would follow the cars on the opening lap of every F1 race. In the United States, the race was broadcast on ABC's Wide World of Sports the Saturday after. It would be broadcast before same-day coverage of the 75-lap Michigan International Speedway USAC Championship Trial event that Andretti (who alternated with rookie Rick Mears in the Gould Charge for Team Penske during the season) was supposed to have participated, where broadcaster Jim McKay noted, "Later Peterson would die, but not until the next morning. Victory so long anticipated and so much earned, now tasted like ashes in Mario's mouth."

At Michigan for the Gould 150 which featured both a 150-mile USAC race and a 100-mile IROC VI round, Andretti was asked about Peterson and he said: "His sincerity I learned to really appreciate that more than anything else and the man is competitive as he was with his skills and I found that this is something that many people in this business like because it's a very selfish business that's basis but he could share with me the basic of the car whatever he found, he changed something even if it was the better." Initially, Andretti had also thought about appealing the penalty, and felt sure he would win it; Lauda himself had given him the Grand Prix's trophy, which he still owns. Upon hearing Peterson's death, Andretti renounced to the appeal, having been declared the 1978 Formula One World Champion. In 2018, he recalled: "There was no celebrating the World Championship. And we forgot about the appeal of the race results. That was my race. I won it. But I let it go. Niki Lauda was given the trophy, but he refused to take it. In fact, I still have it in my house. I remember feeling euphoric happiness, and sadness at its worst. And in a way, that's the legacy of Monza." Andretti did not start the Gould 150 because of engine failure. When asked about the safety and tragedies at Monza at the following week in Michigan, Stewart said that "Yes, but you know there is more racing miles at Monza most than any other race track in the world, I think Monza is the most well kept race track in the world. I don't think that it's dangerous, any more dangerous than any other racetrack, I do think however things can to be changed. The funnel effect from the wide starting area running into that first narrow corner could be eliminated and that certainly could have contributed to this accident, another contributing factor was the untidy start, the starter certainly did not withdrew the correct procedure and therefore was bunching taking place into that first dreadful area approaching the first corner but really I can't say truthfully that Monza should be no longer allowed for Grand Prix racing".

After a few days of anguish, Vittorio Brambilla would finally wake up from his coma. He managed to recognize his loved ones and the doctors were reassured, he would not have any after-effects of his skull fracture. During the Monza broadcast, McKay noted "Brambilla was responding well in a Milan hospital". However, the race ended his full-time career in F1.

In 1998 Speedvision aired a piece of the domination of the Lotus team and the death of Peterson during the build up to the 1998 Italian Grand Prix. Then Ensign driver Derek Daly who was Speedvision's F1 commentator said "That was my second ever Grand Prix and to see the videotape of the fire and the drivers taking Peterson out of the fire, I was one of those drivers and I was absolutely scared stiff because I never ever seen anything like that before but the interesting thing I remember about that is the first words I ever ever said to Mario Andretti was after that crash I was walking back to the pits up the straight from the crash, Mario had not seen it yet because he did a full lap ahead of the accident, was walking down and I said Mario don't go down there. The first words I ever said to him, since become obviously a good friend. Now, also had the mind of a Formula One driver works in strange ways. I went back to my pit, I was so moved about what I saw, I was in tears at the back of the Ensign garage when Mo Nunn who was my team owner at the time came up to me still crying, he said by the way the spare car is ready and the race starts in ten minutes. I went out and had my best Grand Prix result at that time, finished seventh."

== Classification ==
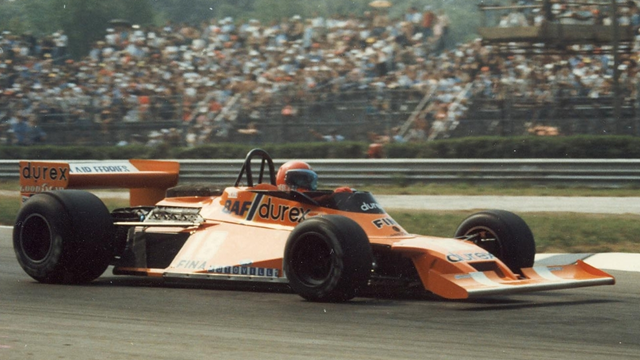
Gimax (Carlo Franchi) tried to qualify without success. He was the last driver to enter a Formula One World Championship race under a pseudonym.

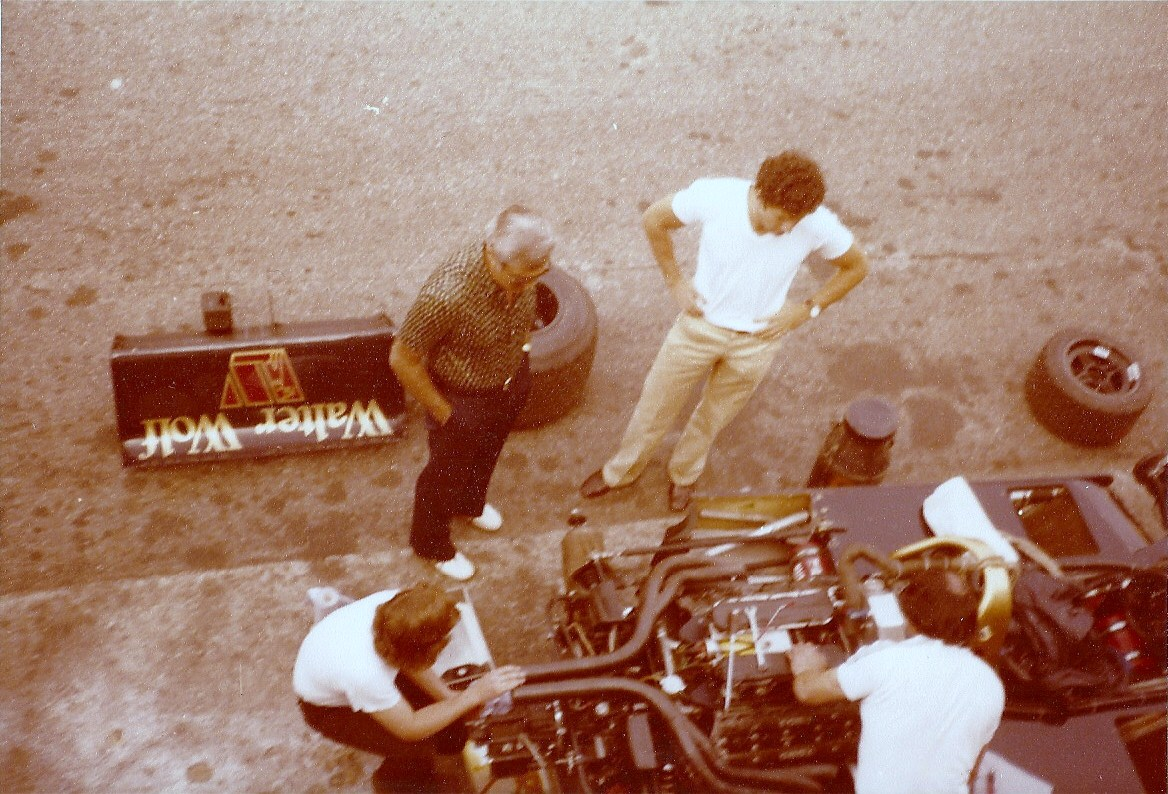
A view of Jody Scheckter in the Wolf pits

Pos.	No.	Driver	Constructor	Tyre	Laps	Time/Retired	Grid	Points
1	1	(Austria) Niki Lauda	Brabham-Alfa Romeo	G	40	1:07:04.54	4	9
2	2	(United Kingdom) John Watson	Brabham-Alfa Romeo	G	40	+1.480	7	6
3	11	(Argentina) Carlos Reutemann	Ferrari	M	40	+20.470	11	4
4	26	(France) Jacques Laffite	Ligier-Matra	G	40	+37.530	8	3
5	8	(France) Patrick Tambay	McLaren-Ford	G	40	+40.390	19	2
6	5	(United States) Mario Andretti	Lotus-Ford	G	40	+46.330^{1}	1	1
7	12	(Canada) Gilles Villeneuve	Ferrari	M	40	+48.480^{1}	2	
8	14	(Brazil) Emerson Fittipaldi	Fittipaldi-Ford	G	40	+55.240	13	
9	29	(Brazil) Nelson Piquet	McLaren-Ford	G	40	+1:06.830	24	
10	22	(Republic of Ireland) Derek Daly	Ensign-Ford	G	40	+1:09.110	18	
11	4	(France) Patrick Depailler	Tyrrell-Ford	G	40	+1:16.570	16	
12	20	(South Africa) Jody Scheckter	Wolf-Ford	G	39	+1 lap	9	
13	27	(Australia) Alan Jones	Williams-Ford	G	39	+1 lap	6	
14	33	(Italy) Bruno Giacomelli	McLaren-Ford	G	39	+1 lap	20	
NC	17	(Switzerland) Clay Regazzoni	Shadow-Ford	G	33	+7 laps	15	
Ret	35	(Italy) Riccardo Patrese	Arrows-Ford	G	28	Engine	12	
Ret	7	(United Kingdom) James Hunt	McLaren-Ford	G	19	Distributor	10	
Ret	37	(Italy) Arturo Merzario	Merzario-Ford	G	14	Engine	22	
Ret	15	(France) Jean-Pierre Jabouille	Renault	M	6	Engine	3	
Ret	6	(Sweden) Ronnie Peterson	Lotus-Ford	G	0	Fatal collision†^{2}	5	
Ret	3	(France) Didier Pironi	Tyrrell-Ford	G	0	Collision	14	
Ret	16	(West Germany) Hans-Joachim Stuck	Shadow-Ford	G	0	Collision	17	
Ret	30	(United States) Brett Lunger	McLaren-Ford	G	0	Collision	21	
Ret	19	(Italy) Vittorio Brambilla	Surtees-Ford	G	0	Collision	23	
DNQ	25	(Mexico) Héctor Rebaque	Lotus-Ford	G				
DNQ	10	(Austria) Harald Ertl	ATS-Ford	G				
DNQ	9	(Netherlands) Michael Bleekemolen	ATS-Ford	G				
DNQ	18	(Italy) Gimax	Surtees-Ford	G				
DNPQ	23	(Austria) Harald Ertl	Ensign-Ford	G				
DNPQ	32	(Finland) Keke Rosberg	Wolf-Ford	G				
DNPQ	36	(West Germany) Rolf Stommelen	Arrows-Ford	G				
DNPQ	38	(Italy) Alberto Colombo	Merzario-Ford	G				

Notes

- ^1 – Andretti and Villeneuve completed the race first and second but received a one-minute penalty for jump start.
- ^2 † – Peterson suffered severe trauma in the legs in a multi-car accident at the start but was otherwise conscious. While in the hospital the night following the race, he was diagnosed with a fat embolism, of which he died the following morning as a result.

== Notes ==
- This was the Formula One World Championship debut for Italian driver Gimax.
- This was the 5th Grand Prix start for an Irish driver.
- This race was the 300th Formula One World Championship Grand Prix, excluding the eleven Indianapolis 500 races that were held between 1950 and 1960. In those 300 races:
  - Graham Hill was the most experienced, having raced 176 of them, but also having the most retirements at 71.
  - Jim Clark had achieved 33 pole positions, 28 fastest laps and 11 Grand Slams. Jackie Stewart had won a record 27 Grands Prix and achieved 43 podium finishes. Juan Manuel Fangio still held the record for the most Championships, at five.
  - Ferrari had raced 286 races (285 as a constructor) and BRM had the most retirements at 47 and a BRM-powered car had the most retirements at 37.
  - Ferrari also achieved 87 pole positions, 82 fastest laps, 22 Grand Slams and a record 241 podium finishes. Both Ferrari and Lotus had won 71 Grands Prix. Ferrari had the most Drivers' World Championships at eight, whereas Lotus held the record of the most Constructors' Championships at six.
  - British engine supplier Cosworth (funded by Ford) held multiple records: 117 Grand Prix wins, 324 podium finishes, 105 pole positions, 101 fastest laps, 8 Drivers' Championships (equal with Ferrari until the end of this season), and 7 Constructors' Championships. A Ferrari-powered car held the record for the most Grand Slams at 22.

== Championship standings after the race ==
Drivers' Championship standings

	Pos	Driver	Points
	1	(United States) **Mario Andretti**	64
	2	(Sweden) Ronnie Peterson	51
2	3	(Austria) Niki Lauda	44
1	4	(Argentina) Carlos Reutemann	35
1	5	(France) Patrick Depailler	32

Constructors' Championship standings

Pos	Constructor	Points
1	(United Kingdom) **Lotus-Ford**	86
2	(United Kingdom) Brabham-Alfa Romeo	53
3	(Italy) Ferrari	40
4	(United Kingdom) Tyrrell-Ford	36
5	(France) Ligier-Matra	19

- Note: Only the top five positions are included for both sets of standings.
- Bold text indicates the 1978 World Champions.

Previous race: 1978 Dutch Grand Prix	FIA Formula One World Championship; 1978 season	Next race: 1978 United States Grand Prix
Previous race: 1977 Italian Grand Prix	Italian Grand Prix	Next race: 1979 Italian Grand Prix
