= 1979 Dino Ferrari Grand Prix =

- Non-championship race in the 1979 Formula One season

Race details
- Date: 16 September 1979
- Official name: Dino Ferrari Grand Prix
- Location: Autodromo Dino Ferrari, Imola, Italy
- Course: Permanent racing facility
- Course length: 5.060 km (3.144 miles)
- Distance: 40 laps, 202.40 km (125.76 miles)

Pole position
Driver	(Canada) Gilles Villeneuve	Ferrari
- Time: 1:32.91

Fastest lap
Driver	(Canada) Gilles Villeneuve	Ferrari
- Time: 1:33.61

Podium
First	(Austria) Niki Lauda	Brabham-Alfa Romeo
Second	(Argentina) Carlos Reutemann	Lotus-Cosworth
Third	(South Africa) Jody Scheckter	Ferrari

The 1979 Dino Ferrari Grand Prix was a non-championship Formula One motor race held at the Autodromo Dino Ferrari, Imola on 16 September 1979.

The event was held in order for the Imola circuit to qualify for World Championship status from the 1980 season onwards, as part of plans to share the Italian Grand Prix with Monza in alternate years. The 1980 Italian Grand Prix was indeed held at Imola, but the race returned permanently to Monza in 1981, with Imola instead given its own race, the San Marino Grand Prix, which was held until 2006.

Sixteen cars entered the race; the eventual winner was Niki Lauda, driving a Brabham-Alfa Romeo. Carlos Reutemann was second in a Lotus-Ford, while Jody Scheckter, who had won the Drivers' Championship at Monza the previous week, was third in his Ferrari. This was the last F1 race in which Brabham used Alfa Romeo engines, and Lauda's last race with the team before he temporarily quit the sport during practice for the Canadian Grand Prix two weeks later.

== Classification ==
=== Qualifying ===
Pos.	No.	Driver	Constructor	Time	Gap
1	12	(Canada) Gilles Villeneuve	Ferrari	1:32.910	—
2	11	(South Africa) Jody Scheckter	Ferrari	1:33.240	+0.330
3	2	(Argentina) Carlos Reutemann	Lotus-Cosworth	1:33.937	+1.027
4	5	(Austria) Niki Lauda	Brabham-Alfa Romeo	1:34.808	+1.898
5	29	(Italy) Riccardo Patrese	Arrows-Cosworth	1:35.265	+2.355
6	36	(Italy) Vittorio Brambilla	Alfa Romeo	1:35.375	+2.465
7	20	(Finland) Keke Rosberg	Wolf-Ford	1:35.649	+2.739
8	4	(France) Jean-Pierre Jarier	Tyrrell-Cosworth	1:35.926	+3.016
9	14	(Brazil) Alex Ribeiro	Fittipaldi-Cosworth	1:37.285	+4.375
10	39	(Italy) Giacomo Agostini	Williams-Cosworth	1:38.554	+5.644
11	35	(Italy) Bruno Giacomelli	Alfa Romeo	1:39.082	+6.172
12	40	(Italy) Gimax	Williams-Cosworth	1:40.066	+7.156
13	24	(Italy) Arturo Merzario	Merzario-Cosworth	1:41.863	+8.953
14	18	(Italy) Elio de Angelis	Shadow-Cosworth	1:58.623	+25.713
15	8	(France) Patrick Tambay	McLaren-Cosworth	-	-
16	19	(Italy) Beppe Gabbiani	Shadow-Cosworth	-	-

=== Race ===
Pos	Driver	Constructor	Laps	Time/Retired	Grid
1	(Austria) Niki Lauda	Brabham-Alfa Romeo	40	1:03:55.89	4
2	(Argentina) Carlos Reutemann	Lotus-Cosworth	40	+ 8.09	3
3	(South Africa) Jody Scheckter	Ferrari	40	+ 26.22	2
4	(Italy) Riccardo Patrese	Arrows-Cosworth	40	+ 39.76	5
5	(France) Jean-Pierre Jarier	Tyrrell-Cosworth	40	+ 47.40	8
6	(Finland) Keke Rosberg	Wolf-Cosworth	40	+ 1:08.33	7
7	(Canada) Gilles Villeneuve	Ferrari	40	+ 1:14.38	1
8	(France) Patrick Tambay	McLaren-Cosworth	39	+ 1 Lap	15
9	(Italy) Vittorio Brambilla	Alfa Romeo	39	+ 1 Lap	6
10	(Italy) Giacomo Agostini	Williams-Cosworth	39	+ 1 Lap	10
11	(Italy) Arturo Merzario	Merzario-Cosworth	38	+ 2 Laps	13
Ret	(Italy) Gimax	Williams-Cosworth	32	Clutch	12
Ret	(Brazil) Alex Ribeiro	Fittipaldi-Cosworth	26	Gearbox	9
Ret	(Italy) Elio de Angelis	Shadow-Cosworth	17	Spun off	14
Ret	(Italy) Bruno Giacomelli	Alfa Romeo	4	Engine	11
DNS	(Italy) Beppe Gabbiani	Shadow-Cosworth	0	Engine	16

Previous race: 1979 Race of Champions	Formula One non-championship races 1979 season	Next race: 1980 Spanish Grand Prix
Previous race: —	Dino Ferrari Grand Prix	Next race: —
