= 1976 European Formula Two Championship =

1976 European Formula Two season

Seasons
- ← 1975 1977 →

The 1976 European Formula Two season was contested over 12 rounds. Équipe Elf Switzerland driver Jean-Pierre Jabouille clinched the championship title. In a change from 1975 pure race engines was allowed and would be to the end of the formula in 1984. For 1976 Renault-Alpine exploited this opportunity.

== Calendar ==
Race No	Circuit	Date	Laps	Distance	Time	Speed	Pole position	Fastest lap	Winner
1	(West Germany) Hockenheim	10-11 April	20+20	6.789=271.56 km	1'21:45.6; 1'23:45.6	199.286 km/h 196.190 km/h	(West Germany) Hans-Joachim Stuck	(West Germany) Hans-Joachim Stuck	(West Germany) Hans-Joachim Stuck (France) René Arnoux
2	(United Kingdom) Thruxton	19 April	55	3.792=208.56 km	1'06:51.54	187.164 km/h	(Italy) Maurizio Flammini	(Italy) Maurizio Flammini	(Italy) Maurizio Flammini
3	(Italy) Vallelunga	9 May	65	3.2=208.0 km	1'18:03.1	159.894 km/h	(France) Jean-Pierre Jabouille	(France) René Arnoux	(France) Jean-Pierre Jabouille
4	(Austria) Salzburgring	23 May	50	4.238=211.9 km	1'04:28.82	197.176 km/h	(Italy) Maurizio Flammini	(France) René Arnoux	(France) Michel Leclère
5	(France) Pau	7 June	73	2.76=201.48 km	1'32:11.58	131.125 km/h	(France) Patrick Tambay	(France) Jacques Laffite	(France) René Arnoux
6	(West Germany) Hockenheim	20 June	20+20	6.789=271.56 km	1'21:27.6; 1'21:34.3	200.020 km/h 199.746 km/h	(West Germany) Hans-Joachim Stuck	(France) Michel Leclère	(West Germany) Hans-Joachim Stuck (France) Michel Leclère
7	(France) Rouen	27 June	38	5.543=210.634 km	1'09:59.77	180.553 km/h	(Brazil) Alex Ribeiro	(France) René Arnoux	(Italy) Maurizio Flammini
8	(Italy) Mugello	11 July	43	5.245=225.535 km	1'19:28.8	170.258 km/h	(France) Jean-Pierre Jabouille	(France) René Arnoux	(France) Jean-Pierre Jabouille
9	(Italy) Pergusa-Enna	25 July	30+30	4.95=297.0 km	1'36:12.9	185.210 km/h	(France) Patrick Tambay	(Brazil) Alex Ribeiro	(France) René Arnoux
10	(Portugal) Estoril	8 August	50	4.35=217.50 km	1'20:19.77	162.456 km/h	(France) René Arnoux	(France) René Arnoux	(France) René Arnoux
	(Belgium) Zolder	22 August	cancelled						
11	(France) Nogaro	19 September	65	3.12=202.80 km	1'20:12.91	151.692 km/h	(France) Jean-Pierre Jabouille	(France) Patrick Tambay	(France) Patrick Tambay
12	(West Germany) Hockenheim	25-26 September	20+20	6.789=271.56 km	1'22:32.9	197.383 km/h	(France) Jean-Pierre Jabouille	(France) René Arnoux	(France) Jean-Pierre Jabouille

Note:

Race 1, 6, 9 and 12 were held in two heats, with results shown in aggregate.

Race 1 and 6 was won by a graded driver, all graded drivers are shown in Italics

== Final point standings ==
=== Driver ===
For every race points were awarded: 9 points to the winner, 6 for runner-up, 4 for third place, 3 for fourth place, 2 for fifth place and 1 for sixth place. No additional points were awarded. The best 9 results count. No driver had a point deduction.

Place	Name	Team	Chassis	Engine	HOC (West Germany)	THR (United Kingdom)	VLL (Italy)	SAL (Austria)	PAU (France)	HOC (West Germany)	ROU (France)	MUG (Italy)	EMM (Italy)	EST (Portugal)	NOG (France)	HOC (West Germany)	Points
1	(France) Jean-Pierre Jabouille	Équipe Elf Switzerland	Elf-Jabouille	Renault	-	-	9	1	6	4	6	9	3	6	-	9	53
2	(France) René Arnoux	Écurie Elf	Martini	Renault	9	-	-	3	9	3	-	6	9	9	-	4	52
3	(France) Patrick Tambay	Écurie Elf	Martini	Renault	6	4	6	4	-	6	-	4	-	-	9	-	39
4	(France) Michel Leclère	Équipe Elf Switzerland	Elf-Jabouille	Renault	-	-	3	9	-	9	-	-	-	-	6	6	33
5	(Brazil) Alex Ribeiro	March Cars/BMW Motorsport	March	BMW	-	6	4	2	3	-	-	3	6	4	3	-	31
6	(Italy) Maurizio Flammini	March Cars/BMW Motorsport	March	BMW	-	9	-	6	-	1	9	1	-	-	-	-	26
7	(Italy) Giancarlo Martini	Scuderia Everest	March	BMW	-	-	-	-	4	2	4	2	-	-	-	-	12
	(Austria) Hans Binder	Chevron Racing	Chevron	BMW	-	-	-	-	-	-	-	-	2	3	4	3	12
9	(United States) Eddie Cheever	Project Four Racing	March	Hart	-	3	-	-	-	-	-	-	4	2			10
9	(United States) Eddie Cheever	Project Four Racing	Ralt	Hart											1	-	10
10	(Italy) Roberto Marazzi	Trivellato Racing Team	Chevron	BMW	3	-	-	-	-	-	2	-	-	-	-	-	5
	(Finland) Keke Rosberg	Team Warsteiner Eurorace	Toj	BMW	-	-	-	-	-	-	3	-	-	-	-	2	5
12	(West Germany) Wilhelm Deutsch	Team Daimon Varley	March	BMW	4	-	-	-	-	-	-	-	-	-	-	-	4
	(West Germany) Klaus Ludwig	Willy Kauhsen Racing Team	March	Hart	-	-	-	-	2	-	-	-	-	-	2	-	4
14	(Brazil) Ingo Hoffmann	Willy Kauhsen Racing Team	March	Hart	-	2	-	-	-	-	1	-	-	-	-	-	3
15	(Austria) Harald Ertl	Motor Racing Company	Chevron	BMW	2	-	-	-	-	-	-	-	-	-	-	-	2
	(Italy) Alessandro Pesenti-Rossi	Scuderia Gulf Rondini	March	BMW	-	-	2	-	-	-	-	-	-	-	-	-	2
17	(West Germany) Hans Heyer	Team Warsteiner Eurorace	Toj	BMW	1	-	-	-	-	-	-	-	-	-	-	-	1
	(France) François Migault	Osella Squadra Corse	Osella	BMW	-	1	-	-	-	-	-	-	-	-	-	-	1
	(France) Jean-Pierre Jaussaud	Sté Racing Organisation Course	Chevron	Chrysler	-	-	1	-	-	-	-	-	-	-	-	-	1
	(Sweden) Freddy Kottulinsky	Fritz Lochmann Racing	Ralt	BMW	-	-	-	-	1	-	-	-	-	-	-	-	1
	(Switzerland) Markus Hotz	Lista Racing Team	March	BMW	-	-	-	-	-	-	-	-	1	-	-	-	1
	(Italy) Alberto Colombo	?	March	BMW	-	-	-	-	-	-	-	-	-	1	-	-	1
	(Italy) Giorgio Francia	Trivellato Racing Team	Chevron	BMW	-	-	-	-	-	-	-	-	-	-	-	1	1
	(Venezuela) Juan Cochesa	Fred Opert Racing	Chevron	BMW	-	-	-	-	-	-	-	-	-	-	-	1	1

Note:

Only drivers which were not graded were able to score points.

== Non-championship race results ==
Other Formula Two races, which did not count towards the European Championship, also held in 1976.

Race name	Circuit	Date	Winning driver	Constructor
(West Germany) XXXIX Internationales ADAC-Eifelrennen	Nürburgring	2 May	(Sweden) Freddy Kottulinsky	(United Kingdom) Ralt-BMW
(Austria) I Preis der Elektro-Diesel-Bosch	Salzburgring	23 May	(Austria) Otto Stuppacher	(United Kingdom) GRD-Ford
(Italy) III Coppa Santamonica	Misano	22 August	(West Germany) Hans-Joachim Stuck	(United Kingdom) March-BMW
