= Keke Rosberg =

Finnish racing driver (born 1948)

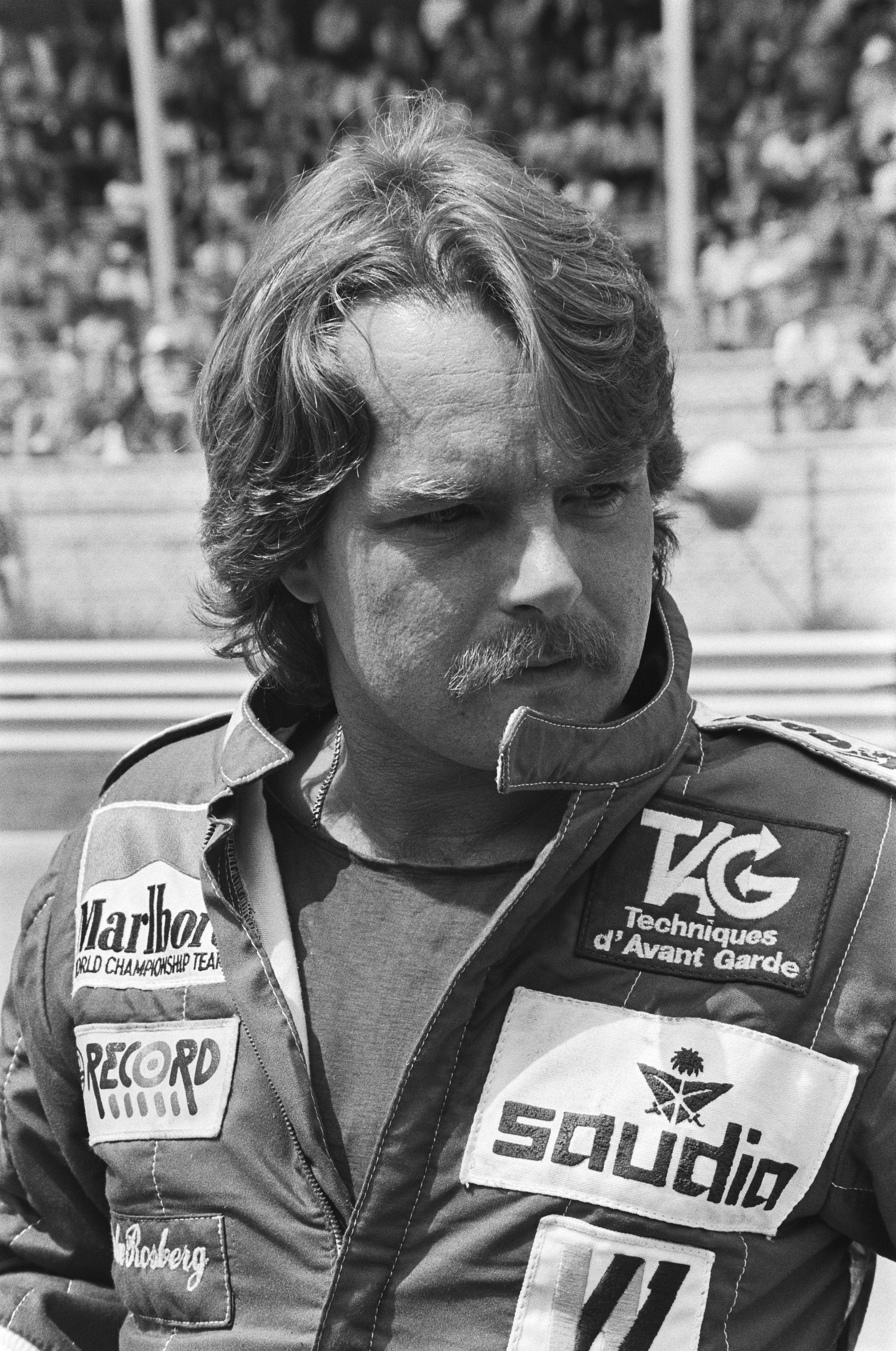
- Rosberg at the 1982 Dutch Grand Prix
- Born: Keijo Erik Rosberg; 6 December 1948 (age 77); Solna, Sweden
- Spouse: Sina Gleitsmann-Dengel (m. 1983)
- Children: Nico Rosberg

Formula One World Championship career
- Nationality: (Finland) Finnish
- Active years: 1978–1986
- Team(s): Theodore, ATS, Wolf, Fittipaldi, Williams, McLaren
- Entries: 128 (114 starts)
- Championships: 1 (1982)
- Wins: 5
- Podiums: 17
- Career points: 159.5
- Pole positions: 5
- Fastest laps: 3
- First entry: 1978 South African Grand Prix
- First win: 1982 Swiss Grand Prix
- Last win: 1985 Australian Grand Prix
- Last entry: 1986 Australian Grand Prix

Keijo Erik "Keke" Rosberg (Finnish pronunciation: [ˈkeke ˈruːsbæri]; born 6 December 1948) is a Finnish former racing driver and motorsport executive, who competed in Formula One from 1978 to 1986. Rosberg won the Formula One World Drivers' Championship in 1982 with Williams, and won five Grands Prix across nine seasons.

Born in Sweden and raised in Finland, Rosberg started his racing career in karting before graduating to Formula Vee in 1972. Upon winning Finnish Championship the following year, Rosberg progressed to Formula Super Vee, where he won the German Championship in 1975. He then moved to European Formula Two, competing from 1976 to 1979. Aged 29, Rosberg made his Formula One debut for Theodore at the 1978 South African Grand Prix. He spent the remainder of the 1978 season with Theodore and ATS, winning the non-championship BRDC International Trophy with the former in his second Formula One appearance. Rosberg returned in 1979 with Wolf, replacing the retired James Hunt from the French Grand Prix onwards. After another non-classified championship finish, Rosberg signed for Fittipaldi in 1980 to partner Emerson Fittipaldi, scoring his maiden points and podium finish on debut.

After two years with Fittipaldi, Rosberg signed for Williams in 1982. He secured his maiden victory during his first season with the team—at the Swiss Grand Prix—and his five further podiums saw him clinch the title at the final race of the season, becoming the first World Drivers' Champion from Finland. Rosberg was unable to defend his title in 1983 as Williams struggled to adapt to the turbo era, despite winning the Monaco Grand Prix and the final non-championship Race of Champions. He took further wins for Williams at the Dallas Grand Prix in 1984, and the Detroit and Australian Grands Prix in 1985, finishing third in the latter championship. Moving to reigning champions McLaren in 1986 to partner Alain Prost, Rosberg was unable to win all year as his teammate took the title, retiring at the end of the season with five race wins, five pole positions, three fastest laps and 17 podiums. Outside of Formula One, Rosberg achieved multiple race wins in the World Sportscar Championship with Peugeot from 1990 to 1991, and was a race-winner in the Deutsche Tourenwagen Meisterschaft, competing from 1992 to 1995.

Since retiring from motor racing, Rosberg has moved into driver management, formerly managing two-time 24 Hours of Le Mans winner JJ Lehto and two-time World Drivers' Champion Mika Häkkinen. He also coached and managed his son Nico from karting at an early age to winning the World Drivers' Championship in 2016. Since 1994, he has owned and managed Team Rosberg, leading them to championships in German Formula Three, Formula BMW, the Deutsche Tourenwagen Masters, and Extreme E.

== Early life ==
Rosberg was born on 6 December 1948 in Solna, Sweden, where his father studied veterinary science. Rosberg's father Lars Rosberg and mother Lea Lautala were both natives of Hamina, Finland. The family moved back to Finland in the spring of 1950, originally settling in a Swedish-speaking village in Lapinjärvi, where young Rosberg had language problems with other children, because his family spoke Finnish. The family later moved to Hamina, Oulu and Iisalmi.

== Formula One career ==
=== Minor teams: 1978–1981 ===
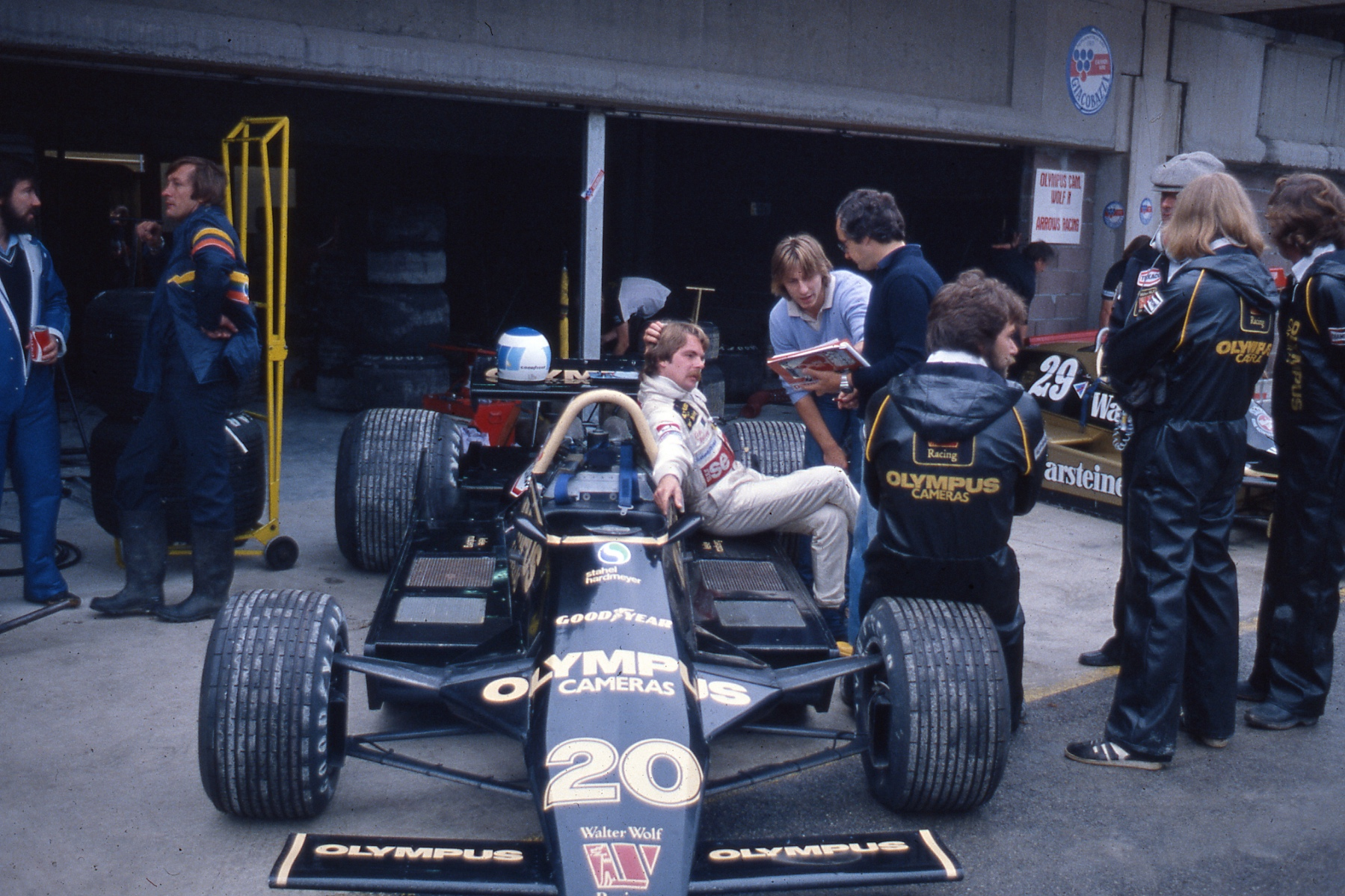
Rosberg in the Wolf pits in 1979.

Rosberg had a relatively late start to his Formula One career, debuting at the age of 29 after stints in Formula Vee, Formula Super Vee, Can-Am, Formula Atlantic, Formula Pacific and Formula Two, then "feeder" series to Formula One. He raced for Fred Opert, his American patron. His first Formula One drive was with the Theodore team during the 1978 season. He immediately caught the attention of the Formula One paddock with a superb drive in the non-Championship BRDC International Trophy at Silverstone in just his second race with the team, emerging victorious after many of the big names had been caught out by a tremendous downpour. Rosberg was not able to qualify for a race afterwards, and was signed by another uncompetitive team, ATS, for three races after the Theodore team scrapped its unreliable car design. He returned to Theodore after they acquired chassis from the Wolf Formula One team, but these were also uncompetitive and Rosberg returned to ATS to end the season.

Rosberg next emerged with the Wolf team, midway through the 1979 season. However, the team was having difficulty staying solvent, and Rosberg had problems in finishing races. Rosberg soon had to change teams again when Wolf left Formula One, and signed with Fittipaldi Automotive which had bought the remains of Walter Wolf's squad. He secured his first two point-scoring results in the 1980 season, including a sensational podium at the season-opening race at Buenos Aires, but the uncompetitiveness of the Fittipaldi car meant that Rosberg often failed to finish or qualify. 1981 was worse as he failed to score at all.

=== The sharp end – Williams: 1982–1985 ===
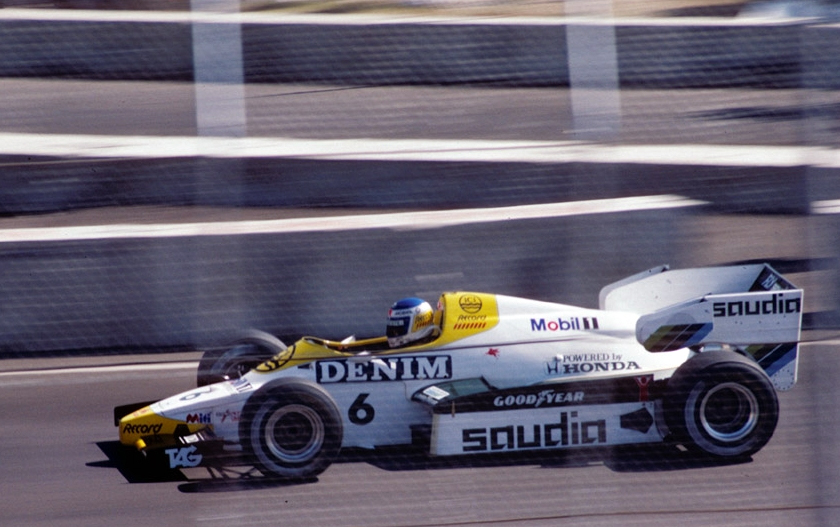
Rosberg won the 1984 Dallas Grand Prix in a Williams FW09.

Despite this, Williams was interested in Rosberg, with the retirement of 1980 World Champion Alan Jones leaving a seat open for the 1982 season. Given a competitive car, Rosberg had a highly successful year. He consistently scored points and earned his first victory in the Swiss Grand Prix at Dijon-Prenois late that year (despite being called the "Swiss Grand Prix", the race was held in France due to Switzerland's ban on motor racing in effect since the 1955 Le Mans disaster).

In a year where no driver won more than two races, with Ferrari's season marred by the death of Gilles Villeneuve at Zolder and the career-ending injuries to Didier Pironi at Hockenheim, and the turbocharged Brabham-BMW and Renault cars suffering from poor reliability (and not helped by Brabham continually changing between the Ford V8 and the BMW turbo), consistency won Rosberg the Drivers' Championship. This was despite his Williams FW07C using the normally-aspirated Ford DFY V8 engine which was considered outdated and out-matched against the vastly more powerful turbo cars. Rosberg won the championship with a five-point lead over Pironi, who had missed the last four races of the season due to injuries sustained at the German Grand Prix. Rosberg's 1982 Championship proved to be the last World Championship win for the old Cosworth DFV engine which had been introduced to Formula One by Lotus in 1967 (the DFY was a development of the DFV). To celebrate the victory, Frank Williams gave Rosberg two days off from testing and allowed him to smoke in the team mobile home. As a result of winning just one race in his title winning season Rosberg equalled the record set by Mike Hawthorn in 1958 for the fewest number wins scored by a driver during a World Championship winning season, a record he still jointly holds with Hawthorn as of 2026.

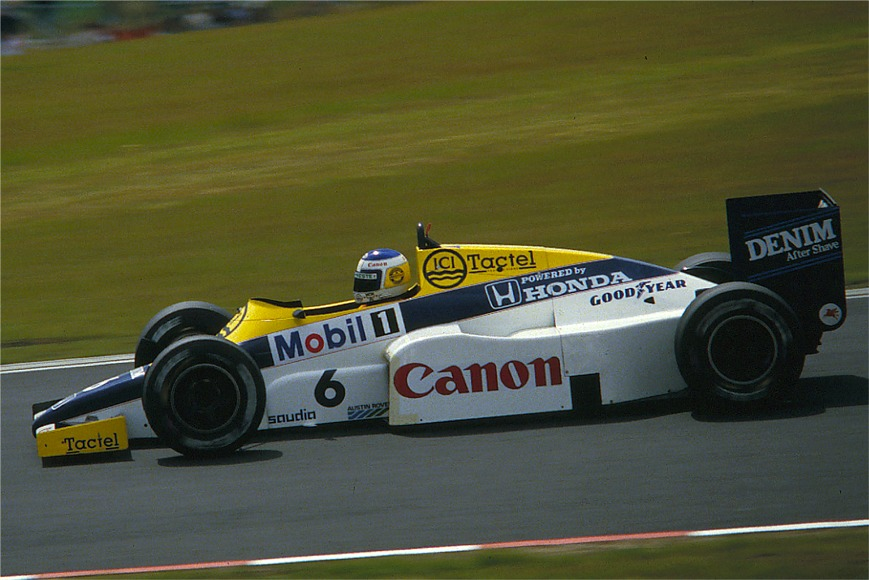
Rosberg driving for Williams at the 1985 German Grand Prix.

Rosberg's post-championship years would be hamstrung by both uncompetitive chassis from Williams, and the powerful but unreliable Honda turbo engine. For his title defense in 1983, Rosberg was again using the reliable Ford DFY V8. However, by this time, the reliability of the Ferrari, Renault and BMW turbo engines was starting to match their speed and power output. Rosberg still put his Williams FW08 on pole for the opening race of the season in Brazil (where he was disqualified from 2nd place because he was push started in the pits after he was forced to abandon his car in his pit bay due to a fuel vapor fire), and then won both the non-championship Race of Champions at Brands Hatch and in Monaco thanks to a choice of slicks at the start when all others started on wets, but it was increasingly obvious that without a turbocharged engine, results would be scarce. To that end, Frank Williams concluded a deal to run the Honda V6 turbo engine in his cars. Honda had come back into Formula One that year with the Spirit team and results had been slow with unreliability, but they were enthusiastic about joining Williams who had a reputation as a Championship-winning team. Rosberg and teammate Jacques Laffite first got their Honda turbos in the season ending South African Grand Prix at Kyalami and immediately the new Williams FW09 was on the pace. Rosberg finished in 5th place to give him 5th place in the championship.

Despite the powerful Honda engines, Williams and Rosberg struggled in 1984 mostly due to the FW09B chassis not being rigid enough to handle the power delivery of the 850 bhp (634 kW; 862 PS) V6. The Finn managed to tame both the car and engine long enough to win the Dallas Grand Prix, but his only other podium for the year was a second at the season opener in Brazil (the third time in succession he finished second in Brazil, but the only one from which he was not disqualified). After a frustrating year he finished the championship in eighth place with 20.5 points.

In November 1984 following the Formula One season, Rosberg, along with fellow Formula One drivers Niki Lauda (the 1984 World Champion), Andrea de Cesaris and François Hesnault, travelled to Australia for the non-championship 1984 Australian Grand Prix at the Calder Park Raceway in Melbourne. Rosberg managed to qualify 4th in his Ralt RT4 Ford despite spending most of the day with fellow aviation enthusiast Lauda (his teammate for the race) attending an air show at the nearby Essendon Airport. After an early race dice with Lauda and a clash with Terry Ryan while lapping the young Australian which put him off the short 1.609 km (1.000 mi) circuit, Rosberg went on to finish 2nd behind the Ralt RT4 Ford of Brazilian driver Roberto Moreno who won his 3rd Australian Grand Prix in 4 years (having also won in 1981 and 1983).

1985 would prove better for both Rosberg and Williams. The Finn had a new teammate in Nigel Mansell and the all carbon fibre Williams FW10 chassis was a big improvement over the FW09B. For the first few races the team used the 1984 engines until Honda introduced an upgraded version which improved power delivery, fuel economy and most importantly, reliability. Rosberg used the new engine to good effect, winning the Detroit Grand Prix and claiming pole in the next two races in France at the Paul Ricard Circuit and the British Grand Prix at Silverstone. Rosberg's pole-winning lap at Silverstone created history when he lapped the 4.719 km (2.932 mi) circuit in 1:05.591 for an average speed of 259.01 km/h (160.94 mph). This would remain the single fastest lap of a circuit in Formula One until broken by Williams driver Juan Pablo Montoya at the 2002 Italian Grand Prix at Monza.

Rosberg's fifth and final Grand Prix victory came at the 1985 Australian Grand Prix on the brand new Adelaide Street Circuit. As it was the final race of the season, it was also Rosberg's final race for Williams. Keke gave the winners trophy to his race engineer, Frank Dernie. The win enhanced Rosberg's reputation as a street circuit specialist, as four of his five championship Grand Prix wins (Monaco, Dallas, Detroit and Adelaide) had come on street circuits. Rosberg handled the 35°C heat better than most and won by 43 seconds from the Ligier Renaults of Jacques Laffite and Philippe Streiff.

Just as the Honda engine began producing regular results, Rosberg decided to leave Williams at the end of 1985 and signed for McLaren, winners of the 1984 and 1985 Drivers' and Constructors' championships. The Williams-Honda team would go on to dominate Grand Prix racing in 1986 and through 1987.

=== The final year – McLaren: 1986 ===
At the time, Rosberg's move to McLaren for the 1986 season had seemed a master stroke as they were the championship team of the previous two seasons, having done so (especially in 1984) in dominating fashion. However, the 1986 McLaren was now somewhat underpowered compared to its rivals, and Rosberg, was soundly beaten by teammate, 1985 World Champion Alain Prost (the McLaren MP4/2C had been designed by John Barnard to suit the smoother style of Niki Lauda and Alain Prost, while Rosberg had never shed the ground effects style of late braking and throwing the car into a corner. It was not until it became known Barnard was leaving for Ferrari that the designer allowed Rosberg to fundamentally change his cars set up to suit his style. Ironically this coincided with Rosberg's only pole position of the season in Germany). On top of that, the fatal crash of Rosberg's close friend Elio de Angelis while testing a Brabham at the Paul Ricard circuit in France in May 1986 deeply affected him and he retired at the end of the season. He would later claim that he retired "too soon".

Rosberg dominated the final race of his Formula One career, the 1986 Australian Grand Prix, though he did not win. While holding a 30-second lead over Nelson Piquet (his replacement at Williams), he had a rear tyre let go on lap 62. Thinking the noise from the back of his McLaren was engine related, he shut the engine off and pulled off the circuit, only to find when he got out and checked that all he needed to do was drive back to the pits to change tyres. However, he later revealed that he would never have won anyway, that he planned to give best to Alain Prost in the Frenchman's bid for back-to-back World Championships (Prost needed to win the race with Nigel Mansell finishing no better than 4th to claim the championship, while Rosberg had dropped out of title contention some races before). As it turned out, Prost won the race and the title, and a lap after Rosberg's retirement Mansell suffered the same fate as his former teammate, though in much more spectacular fashion.

Rosberg, who had made up his mind in mid-1984 that he would only race for two more years (but did not announce it publicly until Germany 1986), had no regrets about leaving Williams and joining McLaren at a time when the Honda engine was starting to come on strong, while the Porsche built TAG engine (and the 3 season old MP4/2) was starting to show its age. In an interview following his retirement announcement, Rosberg said that he was glad he left Williams when he did, stating that had he stayed with them he might have quit Formula One early in the 1986 season after Frank Williams' pre-season accident (in which he suffered a spinal cord injury which left him a tetraplegic) had left someone in a position of authority within the team who he said was one of the reasons he had decided to leave Williams, adding "We simply could not stand each other". While Rosberg did not name the person, it was generally believed to be Williams head designer and Technical Director Patrick Head, who had taken over the day-to-day running of the team while Frank Williams recovered from his accident.

== After Formula One ==
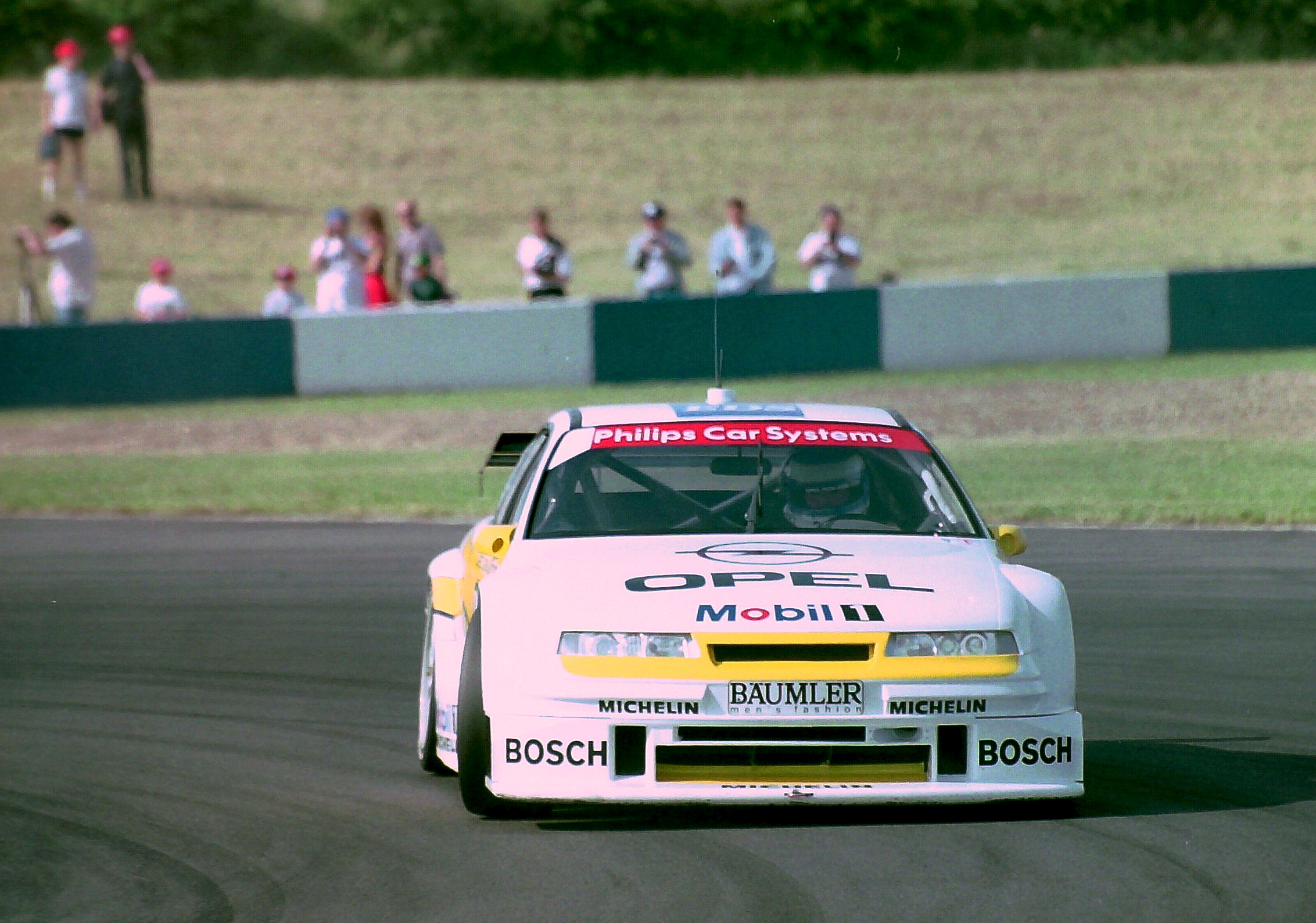
Keke Rosberg – Opel Team Joest – Opel Calibra V6 at Melbourne Hairpin, Donington Park, 1994 DTM

In 1989, Rosberg made his comeback in the Spa 24 Hours in a Ferrari Mondial run by Moneytron (cf. Jean-Pierre Van Rossem and Onyx), the same team that gave Rosberg's protégé JJ Lehto his debut in Formula One. Rosberg was a key element of Peugeot's extremely competitive sportscar squad in the early 1990s. But after two years with the marque and varied successes (two victories and a failed attempt at the 24 Hours of Le Mans), he moved on to the German Touring Car Championship, the DTM, driving for Mercedes-Benz and Opel. Here he set up his own team, Team Rosberg, in 1995 and at the end of that year withdrew from driving to concentrate on running it.

Team Rosberg ran for another year in the DTM, until the series collapsed, and has been present in Formula BMW, German Formula Three, the Formula Three Euroseries and A1 GP since. Team Rosberg returned to the revived DTM in 2000, entering two Mercedes. Success, or even just scoring points, became harder with each passing season and Team Rosberg quit the series after their 2004 campaign, only to return in 2006, this time with Audi.

== Manager of new talent ==
Rosberg later spent a long time managing his countrymen JJ Lehto and future world champion Mika Häkkinen. Until 2008, he also managed his son Nico who entered Formula One in 2006 driving for Williams F1. In 2013 he and Nico became the first father and son to both win at Monaco, 30 years apart from each other. In 2016, he and Nico became the second father son duo to both win Formula One World Championships, after Graham Hill and Damon Hill had won the Championships of 1962 and 1968, and 1996 respectively.

== Helmet ==
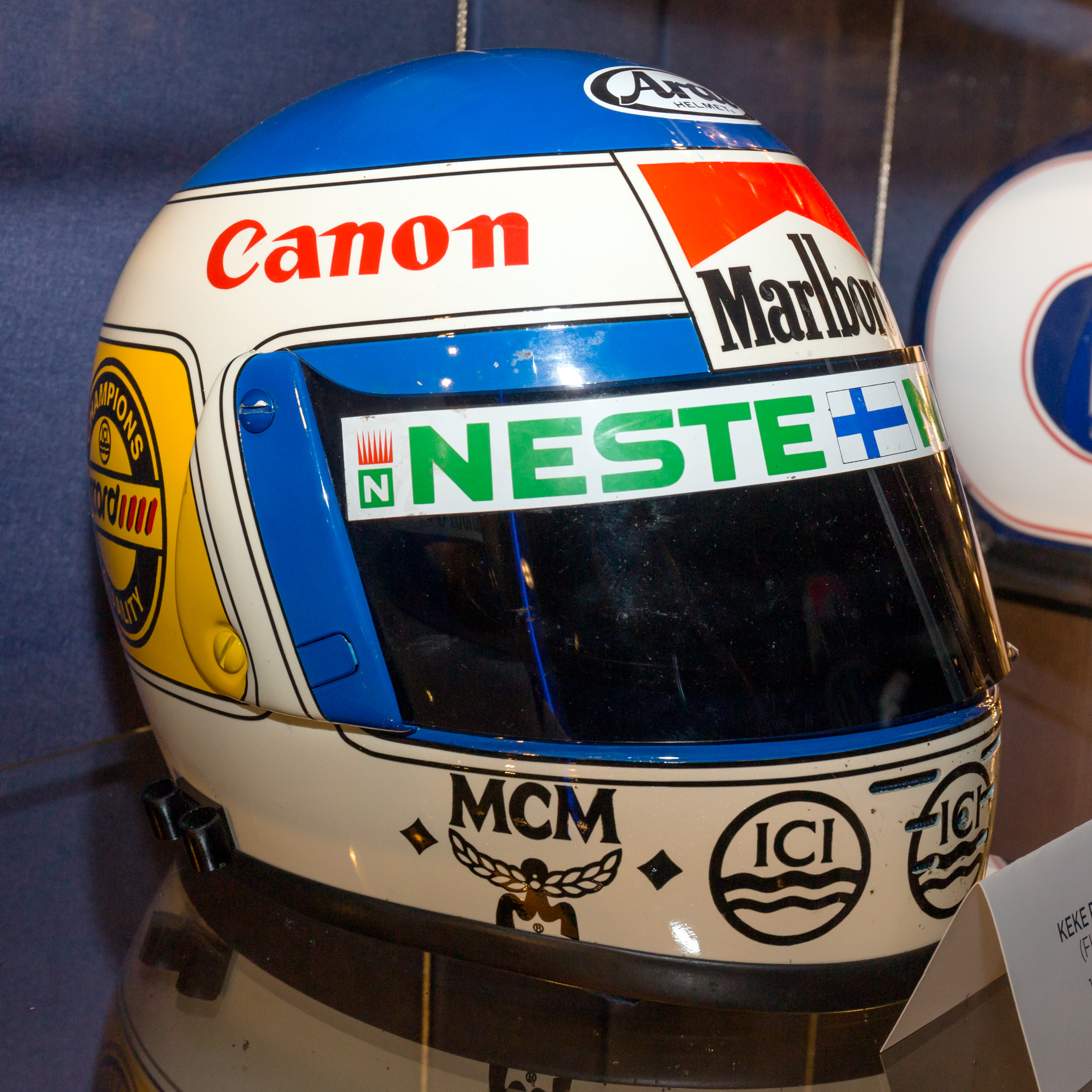
Keke Rosberg's helmet

In his karting years, Rosberg had a white helmet with a blue stripe, then, in Formula One, Sid Mosca (who designed helmets for Brazilian drivers including Ayrton Senna, Rubens Barrichello and Emerson Fittipaldi) painted Rosberg's helmet white with a blue circle on the top, and the stripe was divided into a large blue rectangle covering the visor area with some blue rectangles behind (similar to Didier Pironi's helmet design). In 1984, the rectangles were replaced by a yellow trapezium. His son Nico used a design that had similarities to Keke's helmet earlier in his Formula One career, with grey replacing blue and with flame motifs, before changing to a new design in 2014.

== Racing record ==
=== Career summary ===
Season	Series	Team	Races	Wins	Poles	F/Laps	Podiums	Points	Position
1976	European Formula Two	Team Warsteiner Eurorace	7	0	0	0	0	5	10th
1976	European Formula Two	Fred Opert Racing	1	0	0	0	0	5	10th
1977	European Formula Two	Fred Opert Racing	11	1	1	0	3	25	6th
1978	European Formula Two	Fred Opert Racing	7	1	0	1	2	16	5th
1978	Formula One	Theodore Racing Hong Kong	4	0	0	0	0	0	NC
1978	Formula One	ATS Racing Team	5	0	0	0	0	0	NC
1979	European Formula Two	Project Four Racing	2	1	1	0	1	9	12th
1979	Formula One	Olympus Cameras Wolf Racing	7	0	0	0	0	0	NC
1980	Formula One	Skol Fittipaldi Team	11	0	0	0	1	6	10th
1981	Formula One	Fittipaldi Automotive	9	0	0	0	0	0	NC
1982	Formula One	TAG Williams Team	15	1	1	0	6	44	**1st**
1983	Formula One	TAG Williams Team	15	1	1	0	2	27	5th
1983	World Sportscar Championship	GTi Engineering	1	0	0	0	1	12	25th
1984	Formula One	Williams Grand Prix Engineering	16	1	0	0	2	20.5	8th
1985	Formula One	Canon Williams Honda Team	16	2	2	3	5	40	**3rd**
1986	Formula One	Marlboro McLaren TAG Turbo	16	0	1	0	1	22	6th
1990	World Sportscar Championship	Peugeot Talbot Sport	2	0	0	0	0	0	NC
1991	World Sportscar Championship	Peugeot Talbot Sport	8	2	0	0	2	40	13th
1991	24 Hours of Le Mans	Peugeot Talbot Sport	1	0	0	0	0	N/A	DNF
1992	Deutsche Tourenwagen Meisterschaft	AMG Motorenbau GmbH	23	1	1	4	9	147	5th
1993	Deutsche Tourenwagen Meisterschaft	Joest Racing	2	0	0	0	0	4	18th
1994	Deutsche Tourenwagen Meisterschaft	Opel Joest Racing	22	0	0	0	1	27	14th
1995	Deutsche Tourenwagen Meisterschaft	Opel Team Rosberg	14	0	0	0	0	17	18th
1995	International Touring Car	Opel Team Rosberg	9	0	0	0	0	3	20th

=== Complete European Formula Two Championship results ===
(key) (Races in bold indicate pole position; races in italics indicate fastest lap)

Year	Entrant	Chassis	Engine	1	2	3	4	5	6	7	8	9	10	11	12	13	Pos.	Pts
1976	Team Warsteiner Eurorace	Toj F201	BMW	HOC; Ret	THR; Ret	VAL; DNQ	SAL; 13	PAU	HOC; Ret	ROU; 4	MUG; 24	PER; DNQ			HOC; 5		10th	5
1976	Fred Opert Racing	Chevron B35	Hart										EST; Ret	NOG			10th	5
1977	Fred Opert Racing	Chevron B35	Hart	SIL; Ret													6th	25
1977	Fred Opert Racing	Chevron B40	Hart		THR; Ret	HOC; 8	NÜR; 3	VAL; 12	PAU; 11	MUG; Ret	ROU	NOG; 13	**PER**; 1	MIS	EST; 4	DON; 2	6th	25
1978	Fred Opert Racing	Chevron B42	Hart	THR; Ret	HOC; 8	NÜR; 2	PAU; DNS	MUG; Ret	VAL; Ret	ROU	DON; 1	NOG; 17	PER	MIS	HOC		5th	16
1979	Project Four Racing	March 792	BMW	SIL	HOC; 1	THR	**NÜR**; Ret	VAL	MUG	PAU	HOC	ZAN	PER	MIS	DON		12th	9

=== Complete Formula One World Championship results ===
(key) (Races in bold indicate pole position; races in italics indicate fastest lap)

Year	Entrant	Chassis	Engine	1	2	3	4	5	6	7	8	9	10	11	12	13	14	15	16	WDC	Pts
1978	Theodore Racing Hong Kong	Theodore TR1	Ford-Cosworth DFV 3.0 V8	ARG	BRA	RSA; Ret	USW; DNPQ	MON; DNPQ	BEL; DNQ	ESP; DNPQ										NC	0
1978	Theodore Racing Hong Kong	Wolf WR3	Ford-Cosworth DFV 3.0 V8											GER; 10	AUT; NC					NC	0
1978	Theodore Racing Hong Kong	Wolf WR4	Ford-Cosworth DFV 3.0 V8													NED; Ret	ITA; DNPQ			NC	0
1978	ATS Racing Team	ATS HS1	Ford-Cosworth DFV 3.0 V8								SWE; 15	FRA; 16	GBR; Ret							NC	0
1978	ATS Racing Team	ATS D1	Ford-Cosworth DFV 3.0 V8															USA; Ret	CAN; NC	NC	0
1979	Olympus Cameras Wolf Racing	Wolf WR7	Ford-Cosworth DFV 3.0 V8									GBR; Ret								NC	0
1979	Olympus Cameras Wolf Racing	Wolf WR8	Ford-Cosworth DFV 3.0 V8	ARG	BRA	RSA	USW	ESP	BEL	MON	FRA; 9		GER; Ret			ITA; Ret		USA; Ret		NC	0
1979	Olympus Cameras Wolf Racing	Wolf WR9	Ford-Cosworth DFV 3.0 V8											AUT; Ret	NED; Ret		CAN; DNQ			NC	0
1980	Skol Fittipaldi Team	Fittipaldi F7	Ford-Cosworth DFV 3.0 V8	ARG; 3	BRA; 9	RSA; Ret	USW; Ret	BEL; 7	MON; DNQ	FRA; Ret	GBR; DNQ									10th	6
1980	Skol Fittipaldi Team	Fittipaldi F8	Ford-Cosworth DFV 3.0 V8									GER; Ret	AUT; 16	NED; DNQ	ITA; 5	CAN; 9	USA; 10			10th	6
1981	Fittipaldi Automotive	Fittipaldi F8C	Ford-Cosworth DFV 3.0 V8	USW; Ret	BRA; 9	ARG; Ret	SMR; Ret	BEL; Ret	MON; DNQ	ESP; 12	FRA; Ret	GBR; Ret	GER; DNQ	AUT	NED; DNQ	ITA; DNQ	CAN; DNQ	CPL; 10		NC	0
1982	TAG Williams Team	Williams FW07C	Ford-Cosworth DFV 3.0 V8	RSA; 5	BRA; DSQ	USW; 2	SMR													**1st**	**44**
1982	TAG Williams Team	Williams FW08	Ford-Cosworth DFV 3.0 V8					BEL; 2	MON; Ret	DET; 4	CAN; Ret	NED; 3	**GBR**; Ret	FRA; 5	GER; 3	AUT; 2	SUI; 1	ITA; 8	CPL; 5	**1st**	**44**
1983	TAG Williams Team	Williams FW08C	Ford-Cosworth DFV 3.0 V8	**BRA**; DSQ	USW; Ret	FRA; 5	SMR; 4	MON; 1	BEL; 5	DET; 2	CAN; 4	GBR; 11	GER; 10	AUT; 8	NED; Ret	ITA; 11	EUR; Ret			5th	27
1983	TAG Williams Team	Williams FW09	Honda RA163E 1.5 V6 t															RSA; 5		5th	27
1984	Williams Grand Prix Engineering	Williams FW09	Honda RA163E 1.5 V6 t	BRA; 2	RSA; Ret	BEL; 4^{†}	SMR; Ret	FRA; 6	MON; 4^{‡}	CAN; Ret	DET; Ret	DAL; 1								8th	20.5
1984	Williams Grand Prix Engineering	Williams FW09B	Honda RA164E 1.5 V6 t										GBR; Ret	GER; Ret	AUT; Ret	NED; 8^{†}	ITA; Ret	EUR; Ret	POR; Ret	8th	20.5
1985	Canon Williams Honda	Williams FW10	Honda RA164E 1.5 V6 t	BRA; Ret	POR; Ret	SMR; Ret	MON; 8	CAN; 4												**3rd**	**40**
1985	Canon Williams Honda	Williams FW10	Honda RA165E 1.5 V6 t						DET; 1	**FRA**; 2	**GBR**; Ret	GER; 12^{†}	AUT; Ret	NED; Ret	ITA; Ret	BEL; 4	EUR; 3	RSA; 2	AUS; 1	**3rd**	**40**
1986	Marlboro McLaren International	McLaren MP4/2C	TAG TTE PO1 1.5 V6 t	BRA; Ret	ESP; 4	SMR; 5^{†}	MON; 2	BEL; Ret	CAN; 4	DET; Ret	FRA; 4	GBR; Ret	**GER**; 5^{†}	HUN; Ret	AUT; 9^{†}	ITA; 4	POR; Ret	MEX; Ret	AUS; Ret	6th	22

^{†} Did not finish, but was classified as he had completed more than 90% of the race distance.
^{‡} Race was stopped with less than 75% of laps completed, half points awarded.

=== Formula One non-championship results ===
(key) (Races in bold indicate pole position) (Races in italics indicate fastest lap)

Year	Entrant	Chassis	Engine	1	2	3
1978	Theodore Racing Hong Kong	Theodore TR1	Ford Cosworth DFV 3.0 V8	INT; 1		
1979	Olympus Cameras Wolf Racing	Wolf WR9	Ford Cosworth DFV 3.0 V8	ROC	GNM	DIN; 6
1980	Skol Team Fittipaldi	Fittipaldi F7	Ford Cosworth DFV 3.0 V8	ESP; Ret		
1981	Fittipaldi Automotive	Fittipaldi F8C	Ford Cosworth DFV 3.0 V8	RSA; 4		
1983	TAG Williams Team	Williams FW08C	Ford Cosworth DFV 3.0 V8	**ROC**; 1		

=== Complete World Sportscar Championship results ===
(key) (Races in bold indicate pole position) (Races in italics indicate fastest lap)

Year	Entrant	Class	Chassis	Engine	1	2	3	4	5	6	7	8	9	Pos.	Pts
1983	GTi Engineering	C	Porsche 956	Porsche Type-935 2.6 F6 t	MNZ	SIL	NÜR; 3	LMS	SPA	FUJ	KYA			25th	12
1990	Peugeot Talbot Sport	C	Peugeot 905	Peugeot SA35 3.5 V10	SUZ	MNZ	SIL	SPA	DIJ	NÜR	DON	CGV; Ret	MEX; 13	NC	0
1991	Peugeot Talbot Sport	C1	Peugeot 905	Peugeot SA35 3.5 V10	SUZ; Ret	MNZ; Ret	SIL; Ret	LMS; Ret	NÜR; Ret					13th	40
1991	Peugeot Talbot Sport	C1	Peugeot 905B	Peugeot SA35 3.5 V10						MAG; 1	MEX; 1	AUT; Ret		13th	40

=== Complete 24 Hours of Le Mans results ===
Year	Team	Co-Drivers	Car	Class	Laps	Pos.	Class Pos.
1991	(France) Peugeot Talbot Sport	(France) Yannick Dalmas (France) Pierre-Henri Raphanel	Peugeot 905	C1	68	DNF	DNF

=== Complete Deutsche Tourenwagen Meisterschaft results ===
(key) (Races in bold indicate pole position) (Races in italics indicate fastest lap)

Year	Team	Car	1	2	3	4	5	6	7	8	9	10	11	12	13	14	15	16	17	18	19	20	21	22	23	24	Pos.	Pts
1992	AMG Motorenbau GmbH	Mercedes 190E 2.5–16 Evo2	ZOL; 1; 11	ZOL; 2 Ret	NÜR; 1; 17	NÜR; 2; 8	WUN; 1; 4	WUN; 2; 1	AVU; 1; 12	AVU; 2; 15	HOC; 1; 3	HOC; 2 Ret	NÜR; 1; 3	NÜR; 2; 3	NOR; 1 Ret	NOR; 2; 18	BRN; 1 Ret	BRN; 2; 2	DIE; 1; 3	DIE; 2; 2	ALE; 1 Ret	ALE; 2; 6	**NÜR**; **1**; 2	NÜR; 2; 2	HOC; 1 Ret	HOC; 2 DNS	5th	147
1993	Joest Racing	Opel Calibra V6 4x4	ZOL; 1	ZOL; 2	HOC; 1	HOC; 2	NÜR; 1	NÜR; 2	WUN; 1	WUN; 2	NÜR; 1	NÜR; 2	NOR; 1	NOR; 2	DON; 1	DON; 2	DIE; 1	DIE; 2	ALE; 1	ALE; 2	AVU; 1	AVU; 2	HOC; 1; 7	HOC; 2 Ret			18th	4
1994	Opel Team Joest	Opel Calibra V6 4x4	ZOL; 1; 12	ZOL; 2; 10	HOC; 1 Ret	HOC; 2; 3	NÜR; 1 Ret	NÜR; 2 Ret	MUG; 1; 13	MUG; 2 Ret	NÜR; 1; 9	NÜR; 2 Ret	NOR; 1; 17	NOR; 2 DNS	DON; 1 Ret	DON; 2 DNS	DIE; 1 Ret	DIE; 2 DSQ	NÜR; 1; 5	NÜR; 2 Ret	AVU; 1; 8	AVU; 2 Ret	ALE; 1; 10	ALE; 2 Ret	HOC; 1; 12	HOC; 2 Ret	14th	27
1995	Opel Team Rosberg	Opel Calibra V6 4x4	HOC; 1; 7	HOC; 2 Ret	AVU; 1; 9	AVU; 2; 4	NOR; 1 Ret	NOR; 2 Ret	DIE; 1 Ret	DIE; 2 Ret	NÜR; 1; 4	NÜR; 2 Ret	ALE; 1; 10	ALE; 2 Ret	HOC; 1; 12	HOC; 2; 14											18th	17

=== Complete International Touring Car Championship results ===
(key) (Races in bold indicate pole position) (Races in italics indicate fastest lap)

Year	Team	Car	1	2	3	4	5	6	7	8	9	10	Pos.	Pts
1995	Opel Team Rosberg	Opel Calibra V6 4x4	MUG; 1 Ret	MUG; 2 DNS	HEL; 1 Ret	HEL; 2 Ret	DON; 1; 13	DON; 2 Ret	EST; 1 Ret	EST; 2 Ret	MAG; 1; 12	MAG; 2; 8	20th	3

== In popular culture ==
In level 7 game 11 of the video game Angry Birds, created by the Finnish company Rovio, there is a caricature of Rosberg in a racing car sitting on the year "1982".

In 1985, renowned Finnish actor Matti Pellonpää and his band released a song called "Keke Rosberg formula rock".

In 2020, he appeared with his son Nico in a Heineken anti-drunk-driving ad.

== Bibliography ==
- Keith Botsford & Keke Rosberg (1 January 1985). Keke: An Autobiography. Hutchinson. ISBN 978-0091561802.

Sporting positions
Preceded by René Arnoux (Formula Two)	BRDC International Trophy; Winner; 1978	Succeeded by Eddie Cheever (Formula Two)
Preceded by Nelson Piquet	Formula One World Champion; 1982	Succeeded by Nelson Piquet
Preceded by Gilles Villeneuve	Brands Hatch Race of Champions; Winner; 1983	Succeeded by None (Race not held since)
Awards and achievements
Preceded by Inaugural	Autosport; International Racing Driver Award; 1982	Succeeded by Nelson Piquet
