= AGS JH5 =

The AGS JH5 was an open-wheel Formula 3 race car, designed, developed, built, and used by French constructor AGS in 1972.

The JH5 was built in 1972 by Christian Vanderpleyn. The original plan was to launch a series of vehicles for Formula 3 in order to later be able to sell them to private teams. But the car remained a one-off.

The race car was made of monocoque construction and had a sub-frame that housed the Nova engine. The radiator was in front of the driver and the race car had conventional suspension front and rear. The vehicle was supposed to be used in the European Formula 3 Championship, but was then driven in the French Formula 3 Championship. The driver was Francois Guerre-Berthelot, who became AGS team manager in Formula 1 in 1989. In the championship, which was dominated by Michel Leclère and Alpine Renault, the car was used very rarely and was unsuccessful.
