= Maurizio Flammini =

Italian former racing driver

Maurizio Flammini (born 29 November 1949) is an Italian former racing driver and motorsport promoter.

== Flammini Racing ==
Founded in 1975, Flammini Racing Group was involved in managing sport's marketing and in particular cars/motorcycles sport events and motorshows. Between the Companies founded during his career there was : Octagon Motorsports with the Interpublic Group of Companies, Infront Motorsports and other leading companies in the International Motorsport. He created the Superbike World Championship which has been an still is a leading Championship at world level for motorcycle sports, with billions of viewers in more than 120 countries of the world. Today the Group owns participations in several international companies as Spring Studios, one of the world leading marketing companies in the Fashion are and is developing business in the Health sector.

== Motor Racing Program ==
The rise of Flammini Racing Group began with the Motor Racing Program in 1983. The program was carried out in collaboration with the Italian Motorcycling and Car Federation, the Italian motorsport relaunch program brought huge economic benefits and image promotion to all national motorsport achieving excellent results.

== World Superbike ==
Since its first season in 1988, Flammini Racing Group organized and promoted the FIM World Superbike Championship. The Championship, under the guidance of Maurizio, become one of the two leading championship in the world, challenging the leadership of the MotoGP, and having the participation of even seven motorcycle manufacturers.

== Racing record ==
Flammini's career in Cars Racing started with a win in Monza Formula 3 where he still maintains the lap record. In fact in Monza Maurizio still has 3 lap records : Formula 3 - Formula 2 at the European Championship 1980 and in the SUPERTOURING RACE in 1990 with the Sierra Cosworth 600HP . He was chosen by the Ferrari Formula 1 team managed by Giancarlo Minardi to participate in the Formula 1 championship. He participated in the Formula 2 championship as first driver of the March works team in 1976 and won 4 races in F2 in 2 years (1975 and 1976). He was Italian Touring Car Champion in 1987 and recordman in the European Supertouring Championship race in Monza 1990. He won several races with the CHEVRON Sport 2000 BMW with Genovese racing Team in the 80's.

=== Complete European Formula Two Championship results ===
(key) (Races in bold indicate pole position; races in italics indicate fastest lap)

| Year | Entrant | Chassis | Engine | 1 | 2 | 3 | 4 | 5 | 6 | 7 | 8 | 9 | 10 | 11 | 12 | 13 | 14 | Pos. | Pts |
|---|---|---|---|---|---|---|---|---|---|---|---|---|---|---|---|---|---|---|---|
| 1974 | Equipe Nationale | March 742 | BMW | BAR | HOC; 8 | PAU; DNS | SAL; 5 | HOC; 12 | | | PER; Ret | HOC; Ret | VLL; Ret | | | | | 16th | 2 |
| 1974 | Equipe Nationale | Brabham BT41 | BMW | | | | | | MUG; NC | KAR | | | | | | | | 16th | 2 |
| 1975 | Trivellato Racing Team | March 742 | BMW | EST | THR | HOC | NÜR | PAU | HOC; 3 | | | MUG; 1 | PER; Ret | SIL; Ret | ZOL; 3 | | | 6th | 22 |
| 1975 | Maurizio Flammini | March 742 | BMW | | | | | | | SAL; 6 | ROU; NC | | | | | | | 6th | 22 |
| 1975 | Project 3 Racing | March 752 | BMW | | | | | | | | | | | | | NOG; 11 | | 6th | 22 |
| 1975 | Trivellato Racing Team | March 752 | BMW | | | | | | | | | | | | | | VLL; 3 | 6th | 22 |
| 1976 | March Engineering | March 762 | BMW | HOC; Ret | **THR**; 1 | VLL; 14 | **SAL**; 2 | PAU; Ret | HOC; 7 | ROU; 1 | MUG; 6 | PER; Ret | EST; 13 | NOG; 17 | HOC; Ret | | | 6th | 26 |
| 1977 | Scuderia Gulf Rondini | March 742 | BMW | SIL | THR | HOC | NÜR | VLL; Ret | PAU | MUG; Ret | | | PER; 10 | MIS; DNQ | EST | DON | | NC | 0 |
| 1977 | Fred Opert Racing | Chevron B40 | Hart | | | | | | | | ROU; 9 | NOG | | | | | | NC | 0 |
| 1979 | Sanremo Racing | March 792 | BMW | SIL | HOC | THR | NÜR | VLL; 3 | MUG | PAU | HOC | ZAN | PER | MIS | DON | | | 16th | 4 |
| 1980 | Maurizio Flammini | Ralt RT2 | Hart | THR | HOC | NÜR | VLL | PAU | SIL | ZOL | MUG; Ret | ZAN | PER; Ret | MIS; 11 | HOC | | | NC | 0 |

=== Complete Formula One Non-Championship results ===
(key)

| Year | Entrant | Chassis | Engine | 1 | 2 | 3 |
|---|---|---|---|---|---|---|
| 1975 | Frank Williams Racing Cars | Williams FW02 | Ford Cosworth DFV 3.0 V8 | ROC; DNS | INT | SUI |

=== 24 Hours of Le Mans results ===
| Year | Team | Co-Drivers | Car | Class | Laps | Pos. | Class Pos. |
|---|---|---|---|---|---|---|---|
| 1981 | (Italy) Scuderia Supercar Bellancauto | (Italy) Fabrizio Violati (Italy) Duilio Truffo | Ferrari 512BB | IMSA; GTX | 118 | DNF | DNF |
