= 1975 European Formula Two Championship =

1975 European Formula Two season

Seasons
- ← 1974 1976 →

The 1975 European Formula Two season was contested over 14 rounds. Automobiles Martini driver Jacques Laffite clinched the championship title.

== Calendar ==
Race No	Circuit	Date	Laps	Distance	Time	Speed	Pole position	Fastest lap	Winner
1	(Portugal) Estoril	9 March	50	4.35=217.50 km	1'33:05.83	140.176 km/h	(France) Michel Leclère or (France) Jacques Laffite	(Italy) Giorgio Francia	(France) Jacques Laffite
2	(United Kingdom) Thruxton	31 March	30+30	3.792=227.52 km	1'13:07.8	186.670 km/h	(Italy) Vittorio Brambilla (France) Jacques Laffite	(France) Jacques Laffite (United Kingdom) Brian Henton	(France) Jacques Laffite
3	(West Germany) Hockenheim	13 April	20+20	6.789=271.56 km	1'22:57.9	196.391 km/h	(France) Patrick Tambay	(France) Jacques Laffite	(France) Gérard Larrousse
4	(West Germany) Nürburgring (Eifelrennen)	April 26/27	7+7	22.835=319.69 km	1'46:24.2	180.271 km/h	(France) Jacques Laffite	(West Germany) Hans-Joachim Stuck	(France) Jacques Laffite
5	(France) Pau	11 May	73	2.76=201.48 km	1'32:10.70	131.146 km/h	(France) Jacques Laffite	(France) Jacques Laffite	(France) Jacques Laffite
6	(West Germany) Hockenheim	8 June	20+20	6.789=271.56 km	1'22:51.2	196.656 km/h	(France) Jacques Laffite	(France) Jacques Laffite (France) Jean-Pierre Jabouille	(France) Jacques Laffite
7	(Austria) Salzburgring	15 June	55	4.238=233.09 km	1'06:23.48	210.651 km/h	(France) Michel Leclère	(France) Jean-Pierre Jabouille	(France) Jean-Pierre Jabouille
8	(France) Rouen	29 June	40	5.543=221.72 km	1'13:30.48	180.976 km/h	(France) Jean-Pierre Jabouille	(France) Jean-Pierre Jaussaud	(France) Michel Leclère
9	(Italy) Mugello	13 July	25+25	5.245=262.25 km	1'34:26.2	166.620 km/h	(Italy) Duilio Truffo	(Italy) Duilio Truffo	(Italy) Maurizio Flammini
10	(Italy) Pergusa-Enna	27 July	30+30	4.95=297.0 km	1'39:58.3	178.251 km/h	(France) Patrick Tambay	(France) Michel Leclère	(France) Jacques Laffite
11	(United Kingdom) Silverstone	31 August	25+25	4.719=235.95 km	1'11:05.56	199.134 km/h	(France) Michel Leclère	(France) Jacques Laffite or (France) Jean-Pierre Jabouille	(France) Michel Leclère
12	(Belgium) Zolder	14 September	24+24	4.262=204.576 km	1'12:46.82	168.652 km/h	(France) Jacques Laffite	(France) Gérard Larrousse	(France) Michel Leclère
13	(France) Nogaro	28 September	65	3.12=202.80 km	1'20:44.08	150.716 km/h	(France) Patrick Tambay	(France) Jean-Pierre Jabouille	(France) Patrick Tambay
14	(Italy) Vallelunga	12 October	35+35	3.2=224.0 km	1'26:08.7; 1'26:48.0	156.016 km/h 154.839 km/h	(France) Michel Leclère	(France) Jacques Laffite	(Italy) Vittorio Brambilla (France) Jacques Laffite

Note:

Race 2 3, 4, 6, 9, 10, 11, 12 and 14 were held in two heats, with results shown in aggregate.

Race 14 was won by a graded driver, all FIA graded drivers are shown in Italics

== Final point standings ==
=== Driver ===
For every race points were awarded: 9 points to the winner, 6 for runner-up, 4 for third place, 3 for fourth place, 2 for fifth place and 1 for sixth place. No additional points were awarded. The best 7 results count. No driver had a point deduction.

Place	Name	Team	Chassis	Engine	EST (Portugal)	THR (United Kingdom)	HOC (West Germany)	NÜR (West Germany)	PAU (France)	HOC (West Germany)	SAL (Austria)	ROU (France)	EMM (Italy)	MUG (Italy)	SIL (United Kingdom)	ZOL (Belgium)	NOG (France)	VLL (Italy)	Points
1	(France) Jacques Laffite	Écurie Elf Ambrozium	Martini	BMW	9	9	-	9	9	9	-	-	-	9	-	-	-	9	63
2	(France) Patrick Tambay	Team March	March	BMW	-	6	-	6	-	-	-	6	-	-	3	6	9	-	36
	(France) Michel Leclère	Team March	March	BMW	-	-	-	-	3	-	-	9	-	-	9	9	6	-	36
4	(France) Gérard Larrousse	Équipe Elf Switzerland	Alpine	BMW	-	-	9	-	4	-	-	-	-	6					27
4	(France) Gérard Larrousse	Équipe Elf Switzerland	Elf2	BMW											6	-	-	2	27
5	(France) Jean-Pierre Jabouille	Équipe Elf Switzerland	Elf2	BMW	-	2	-	3	6	-	9	-	-	-	-	-	4	-	24
	(Italy) Maurizio Flammini	Trivellato Racing Team	March	BMW	-	-	-	-	-	4	1	-	9	-	-	4	-	6	24
7	(Belgium) Claude Bourgoignie	Team Vaillant	March	BMW	-	-	2	-	1	6	3	4	-	-	-	-	-	-	16
	(Italy) Giorgio Francia	Osella Squadra Corse	Osella	BMW	3	-	3	1	-	2	2	-	-	3	-	2	-	-	16
9	(Italy) Alessandro Pesenti-Rossi	?	March	BMW	-	-	1	-	-	-	-	-	6	1	-	-	2	4	14
10	(Italy) Gabriele Serblin	Elba Racing	March	BMW	-	-	-	-	-	-	4	1	-	4	2	-	-	-	11
11	(Italy) Duilio Truffo	Osella Squadra Corse	Osella	BMW	2	1	-	-	2	1	-	-	2	2	-	-	-	-	10
	(United Kingdom) Brian Henton	?	March	Ford	-	-	6	-	-	-	-	-	-	-					10
	(United Kingdom) Brian Henton	Wheatcroft Racing	Wheatcroft-Pilbeam	Ford											4	-	-	-	10
13	(Austria) Hans Binder	Team Eurorace	March	BMW	-	-	-	-	-	-	6	-	-	-	-				9
13	(Austria) Hans Binder	?	Chevron	BMW												3	-	-	9
	(Italy) Giancarlo Martini	Scuderia del Passatore	March	BMW	1	4	-	-	-	-	-	-	-	-	1	-	-	3	9
15	(Switzerland) Loris Kessel	Ambrozium Racing	March	BMW	-	-	4	-	-	3	-	-	-	-	-	-	-	-	7
16	(Switzerland) Jo Vonlanthen	Brissago Blauband Racing	March	BMW	6	-	-	-	-	-	-	-	-	-	-	-	-	-	6
	(France) Jean-Pierre Jaussaud	Fred Opert Racing	March	Ford	-	-	-	-	-	-	-	3	-	-	-	-			6
	(France) Jean-Pierre Jaussaud	Project Three Racing	March	BMW													3	-	6
18	(Italy) Lamberto Leoni	Scuderia del Passatore	March	BMW	4	-	-	-	-	-	-	-	-	-	-	-	-	-	4
	(Austria) Harald Ertl	Fred Opert Racing	Chevron	BMW	-	-	-	4	-	-	-	-	-	-	-	-	-	-	4
	(Italy) Gianfranco	Scuderia del Passatore	March	BMW	-	-	-	-	-	-	-	-	4	-	-	-	-	-	4
	(Italy) Carlo Giorgio	Scuderia Jolly Club	March	Ford	-	-	-	-	-	-	-	-	3	-	-	-	-	1	4
22	(Mexico) Héctor Rebaque	Fred Opert Racing	Chevron	Ford	-	3	-	-	-	-	-	-	-	-	-	-	-	-	3
	(Belgium) Bernard de Dryver	Trivellato Racing Team	March	BMW	-	-	-	-	-	-	-	2	1	-	-	-	-	-	3
24	(Italy) Sandro Cinotti	Project Three Racing	Chevron	BMW	-	-	-	2	-	-	-	-	-	-	-	-	-	-	2
25	(United Kingdom) Ray Mallock	Ardmore Racing	March	Ford	-	-	-	-	-	-	-	-	-	-	-	1	-	-	1
	(Italy) Alberto Colombo	Trivellato Racing Team	March	BMW	-	-	-	-	-	-	-	-	-	-	-	-	1	-	1

Note:

Only drivers which were not FIA graded were able to score points.

== Non-championship race results ==
Other Formula Two races, which did not count towards the European Championship, also held in 1975.

Race name	Circuit	Date	Winning driver	Constructor
(France) XV Grand Prix de Magny-Cours	Magny-Cours	4 May	(France) Jean-Pierre Jabouille	(France) Elf-BMW
(Italy) II Coppa Santamonica	Misano	24 August	(Italy) Maurizio Flammini	(United Kingdom) March-BMW
