= Renault Sport =

Vehicles division for Renault-badged cars

- Formerly: Renault Sport (1976–2002); Renault Sport Technologies (2002–2015); Renault Sport Racing/Renault Sport Cars (2016–2021); Renault Sport division of the Alpine business unit (2021–2023)
- Type: Division
- Industry: Automotive
- Founded: 1976 (first company)
- Defunct: December 2023; 2 years ago
- Products: Sports cars
- Divisions: Gordini; Renault Tech

Renault Sport (French pronunciation: [ʁəno spɔʁ]) or Renaultsport, was a motorsport, performance and special vehicles division for Renault-badged cars and later a sub-badge of Renault cars managed by Alpine. The first Renault Sport was officially established as a company in 1976 as a merger between the Alpine and Gordini competition departments. It was made a division and reorganised in 2002 and 2016. In December 2021, all Renault Sport operations were merged into an Alpine-led business unit. The Renault Sport car range under Alpine was completely phased out by the end of 2023.

== History ==
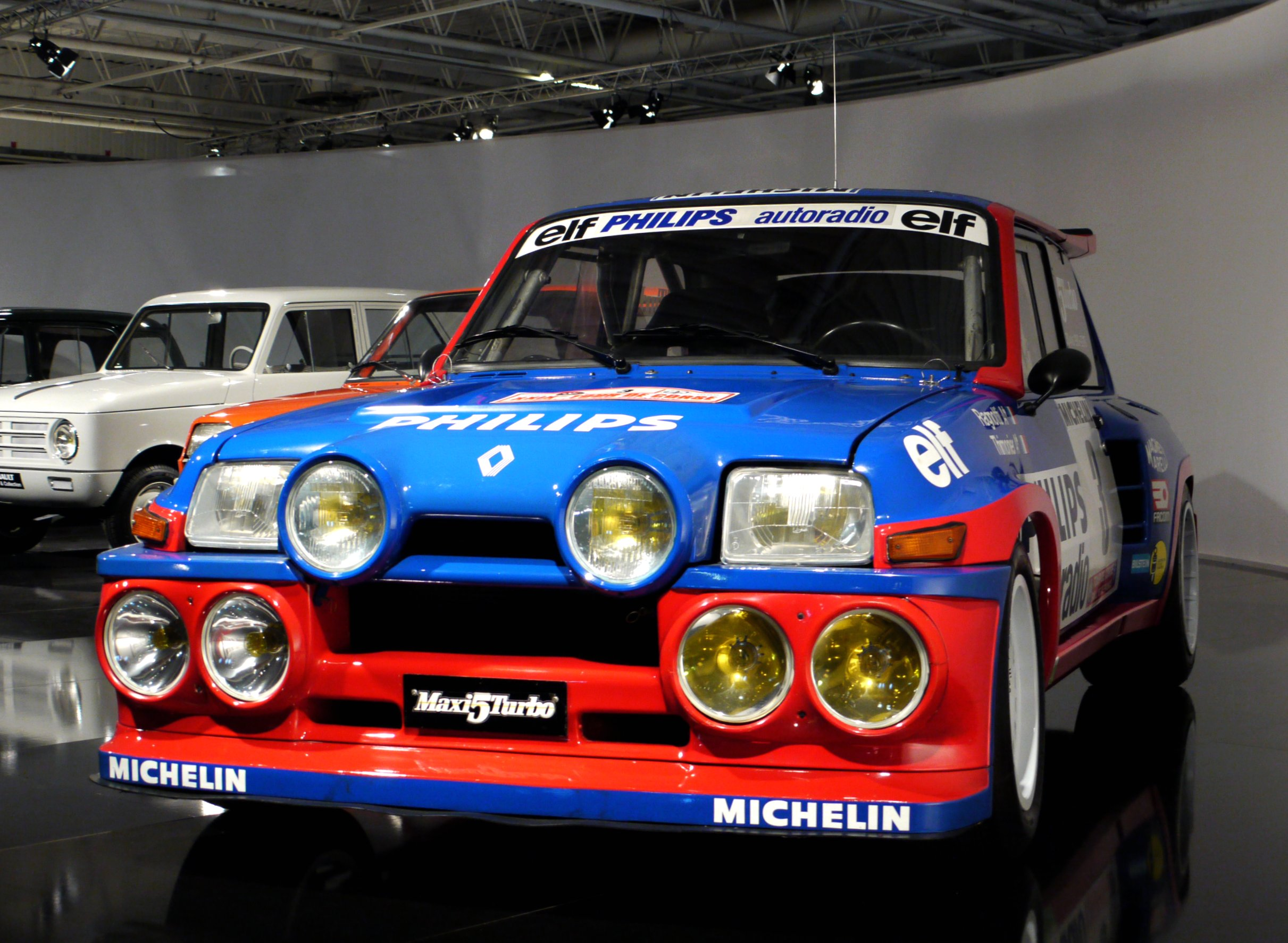
A Renault R5 Maxi Turbo

Old Renault Sport's logo used from the mid-1980s to 2004

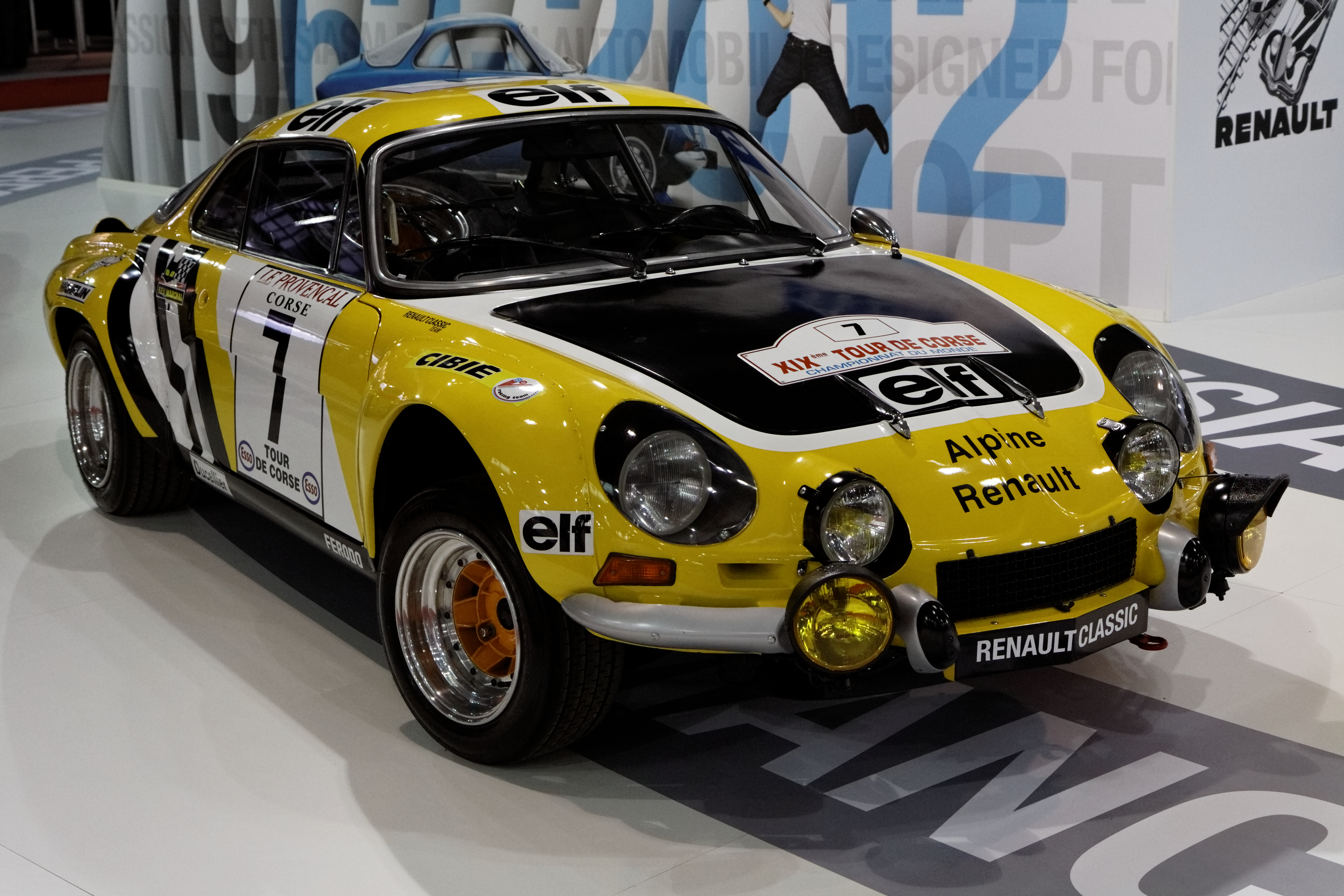
Renault Alpine A110

Renault Sport was created at the end of 1976, when Renault closed down the Alpine competition department (at that time, its main motorsport division), located at Dieppe, and moved all the racing activities to the Gordini factory at Viry-Châtillon, just outside Paris. The Dieppe-based Alpine department specialised in the construction of race car chassis while the Viry-Châtillon-based Gordini focussed on engines. However, several conflicts emerged between them, and Renault took the decision to unify both departments into a single location in order to achieve a greater integration and harmony. The company concentrated principally on developing a car for Formula One, although it also participated in other series.

In 2002, the Viry-Châtillon factory became the engine department of the Renault F1 team and Renault Sport was moved to Les Ulis and renamed Renault Sport Technologies (RST).

On 3 February 2016, Renault announced a reorganisation of its racing and performance activities. The Formula One operation and RST's former motorsport branch were put under the new Renault Sport Racing division. RST's former roadcar branch at Les Ulis became the Renault Sport Cars division.

In January 2021, the Alpine company announced it would absorb both Renault Sport Racing and Renault Sport Cars to form an Alpine business unit. The Renault Sport range, under Alpine, is slowly being phased out. The final new Renault Sport-badged car, the Megane Renault Sport Ultime (a variant of the fourth-generation Megane model) introduced in early 2023, was set to cease production in late 2023.

=== Rallying ===
Gordini-tuned Renault cars won many rallies during the 1950s and 1960s, and Alpine, being a subsidiary of Renault, won the first World Rally Championship (WRC) in 1973. In the WRC, Renault had some success with cars such as the R5 Turbo and the R17 Gordini until it left international rallying in late 1994 (although it continued competing in national and promotional rally series).

The European Rally Championship was won three times by a Renault car (1999, 2004, 2005).

On 21 February 2013, Renault Sport Technologies announced its official return to international rallying in the European Rally Championship.

==== Renault's WRC summary ====
Season	Victories	WMC	Points
1974†	(United States) Press-on-Regardless Rally: (France) Jean-Luc Thérier (Renault 17 Gordini)	10th	23
1975†	-	15th	8
1976	-	14th	6
1977	-	11th	18
1978	-	9th	33
1979	-	7th	41
1980	-	13th	12
1981	(Monaco) Monte Carlo Rally: (France) Jean Ragnotti (Renault 5 Turbo)	7th	61
1982	(France) Tour de Corse: (France) Jean Ragnotti (Renault 5 Turbo)	6th	34
1983	-	5th	27
1984	-	5th	55
1985	(France) Tour de Corse: (France) Jean Ragnotti (Renault R5 Maxi Turbo)	6th	38
1986	Rally of Portugal: Joaquim Moutinho (Renault 5 Turbo)	7th	14
1987	-	3rd	71
1988	-	6th	32
1989	(Ivory Coast) Rallye Côte d'Ivoire: (France) Alain Oreille (Renault 5 GT Turbo)	7th	30
1990	-	6th	24
1991	-	9th	4
1992	-	8th	9
1993	-	NC	-
1994	-	NC	-

† Without Renault Sport assistance.

==== JWRC ====
Year	Entrant	Car	No	Driver	1	2	3	4	5	6	7	8	9	JWRC	Points
2003	Renault Sport	Renault Clio S1600	61	(France) Brice Tirabassi	MON; 1	TUR; Ret	GRE; 1	FIN; 2	ITA; Ret	ESP; 1	GBR; Ret			**1st**	**38**
2004	Renault Sport	Renault Clio S1600	39	(France) Nicolas Bernardi	MON; 1	GRE; 2	TUR; Ret	FIN; 3	GBR; Ret	ITA; 6	ESP; 1			**2nd**	**37**
2004	Renault Sport	Renault Clio S1600	51	(Belgium) Larry Cols	MON; 5	GRE; 4	TUR; Ret	FIN; 6	GBR; Ret	ITA; 4	ESP; 5			6th	21
2006	Renault Sport	Renault Clio S1600	41	(Sweden) Patrik Sandell	SWE; 2	ESP	FRA	ARG; 2	ITA; 1	GER	FIN; 7	TUR; 11	GBR; 6	**1st**	**32**
2006	Renault Sport	Renault Clio S1600	51	(Turkey) Fatih Kara	SWE	ESP; 7	FRA; 6	ARG	ITA; Ret	GER; 7	FIN	TUR; 9	GBR; Ret	16th	7
2006	Renault Sport	Renault Clio S1600	52	(Belgium) Bernd Casier	SWE	ESP; 2	FRA; 10	ARG	ITA; Ret	GER; 2	FIN	TUR; 8	GBR; Ret	11th	17
2007	Renault Sport	Renault Clio R3	31	(Sweden) Patrik Sandell	NOR; 2	POR; 15	ITA; 8	FIN; 1	GER; EX	ESP	FRA			6th	19
2007	Renault Sport	Renault Clio R3	48	(Finland) Kalle Pinomäki	NOR; 10	POR; 9	ITA; Ret	FIN; 2	GER; 9	ESP; Ret	FRA			11th	8

=== Off-roading ===
In 1979, the Marreau brothers finished in second place in the cars category at the Rally Dakar driving a Sinpar-prepared 4L 4x4. They won the 1982 edition with a Renault Sport backed Renault 20 Turbo 4x4. Later, Renault Sport powered and sponsored the Schlesser-Renault Elf buggies which won the 1999 and 2000 editions. The 1999 car was the first two-wheel drive Dakar winner.

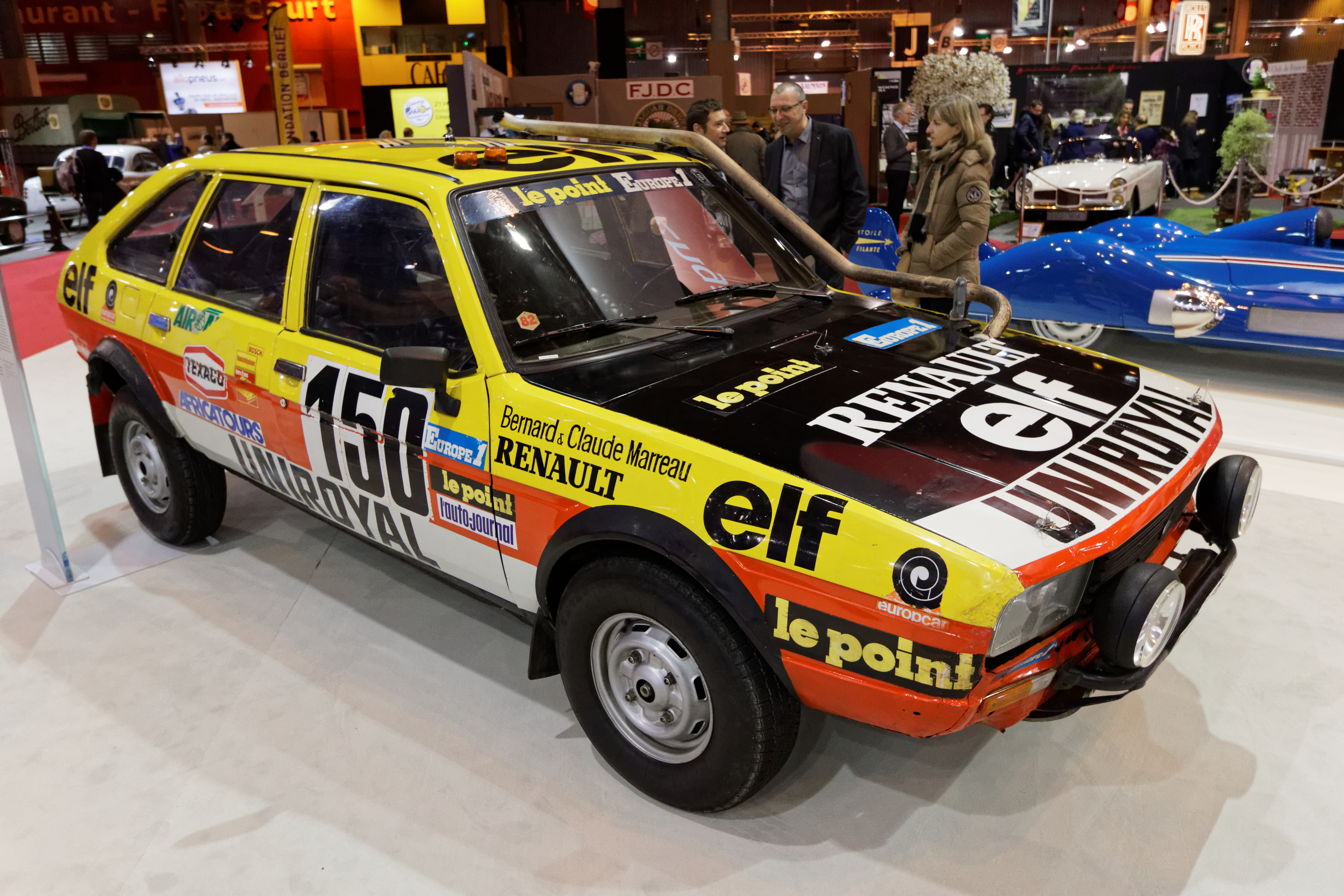
Renault 20 Turbo 4X4 Paris-Dakar - 1982

=== Formula E ===
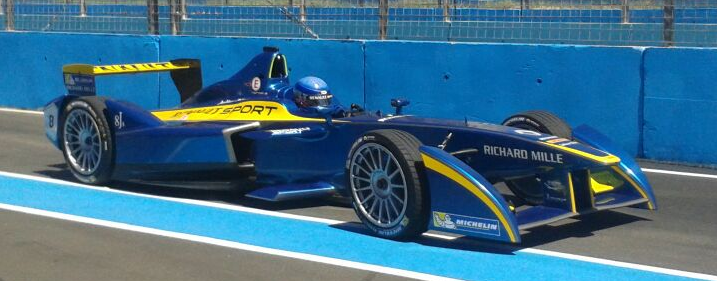
A Renault Sport-backed e.dams car driven by Nicolas Prost during the 2014 Punta del Este ePrix weekend

Renault was one of the first car manufacturers involved in the Formula E (FE) championship. For the inaugural season, Renault Sport became a technical partner of the series, also agreeing a title sponsorship deal with the e.dams team which achieved the first FE teams' championship. Before the 2015–16 season, following the introduction of new rules allowing the development of the electric powertrains used in the FE's Spark chassis, Renault announced it would entry as a supplier for e.dams. The new powertrain manufactured by Renault Sport was named Renault ZE 15. For the 2016–17 season, Renault added the Chinese team Techeetah as a powertrain client. In October 2017, Renault Sport Racing announced it would withdraw from FE at the end of the 2017–18 season.

==== Results of Renault Sport as a powertrain supplier ====
(key) (results in bold indicate pole position, results in italics indicate fastest lap)

Season	Entrant	Chassis	Powertrain	Tyres	Drivers	1	2	3	4	5	6	7	8	9	10	11	12	Points	TC
2015–16	Renault e.dams	Spark	Renault ZE 15	M		BEI	PUT	PDE	BNA	MEX	LBH	PAR	BER	LON				270	1st
2015–16	Renault e.dams	Spark	Renault ZE 15	M	(France) Nicolas Prost	Ret	10	5	5	3	11	4	4	**1**	1			270	1st
2015–16	Renault e.dams	Spark	Renault ZE 15	M	(Switzerland) Sébastien Buemi	**1**	**Ret**	1	2	2	16	3	1	5	**Ret**			270	1st
2016–17	Renault e.dams	Spark	Renault ZE 16	M		HKG	MAR	BNA	MEX	MON	PAR	BER		NYC		MTR		268	1st
2016–17	Renault e.dams	Spark	Renault ZE 16	M	(France) Nicolas Prost	4	4	4	5	9	5	5	8	8	6	6	Ret	268	1st
2016–17	Renault e.dams	Spark	Renault ZE 16	M	(Switzerland) Sébastien Buemi	1	1	1	13	**1**	**1**	DSQ	1			DSQ	11	268	1st
2016–17	Renault e.dams	Spark	Renault ZE 16	M	(France) Pierre Gasly									7	4			268	1st
2016–17	Techeetah	Spark	Renault ZE 16	M															
2016–17	Techeetah	Spark	Renault ZE 16	M	(France) Jean-Éric Vergne	Ret	8	2	2	Ret	Ret	8	6	2	8	2	1	156	5th
2016–17	Techeetah	Spark	Renault ZE 16	M	(China) Qing Hua Ma	Ret	15	16										156	5th
2016–17	Techeetah	Spark	Renault ZE 16	M	(Mexico) Esteban Gutiérrez				10	8	12							156	5th
2016–17	Techeetah	Spark	Renault ZE 16	M	(France) Stéphane Sarrazin							11	14	3	12	3	8	156	5th
2017–18	Renault e.dams	Spark	Renault ZE 17	M		HKG		MAR	SAN	MEX	PDE	ROM	PAR	BER	ZÜR	NYC		133	5th
2017–18	Renault e.dams	Spark	Renault ZE 17	M	(France) Nicolas Prost	9	8	13	10	Ret	15	14	16	14	Ret	10	11	133	5th
2017–18	Renault e.dams	Spark	Renault ZE 17	M	(Switzerland) Sébastien Buemi	11	10	**2**	3	3	Ret	6	5	4	5	3	4	133	5th
2017–18	Techeetah	Spark	Renault ZE 17	M															
2017–18	Techeetah	Spark	Renault ZE 17	M	(Germany) André Lotterer	DSQ	13	Ret	2	13	12	3	6	9	4	7	9	262	2nd
2017–18	Techeetah	Spark	Renault ZE 17	M	(France) Jean-Éric Vergne	**2**	4	5	**1**	5	**1**	5	**1**	3	10	5	1	262	2nd

=== Formula One ===
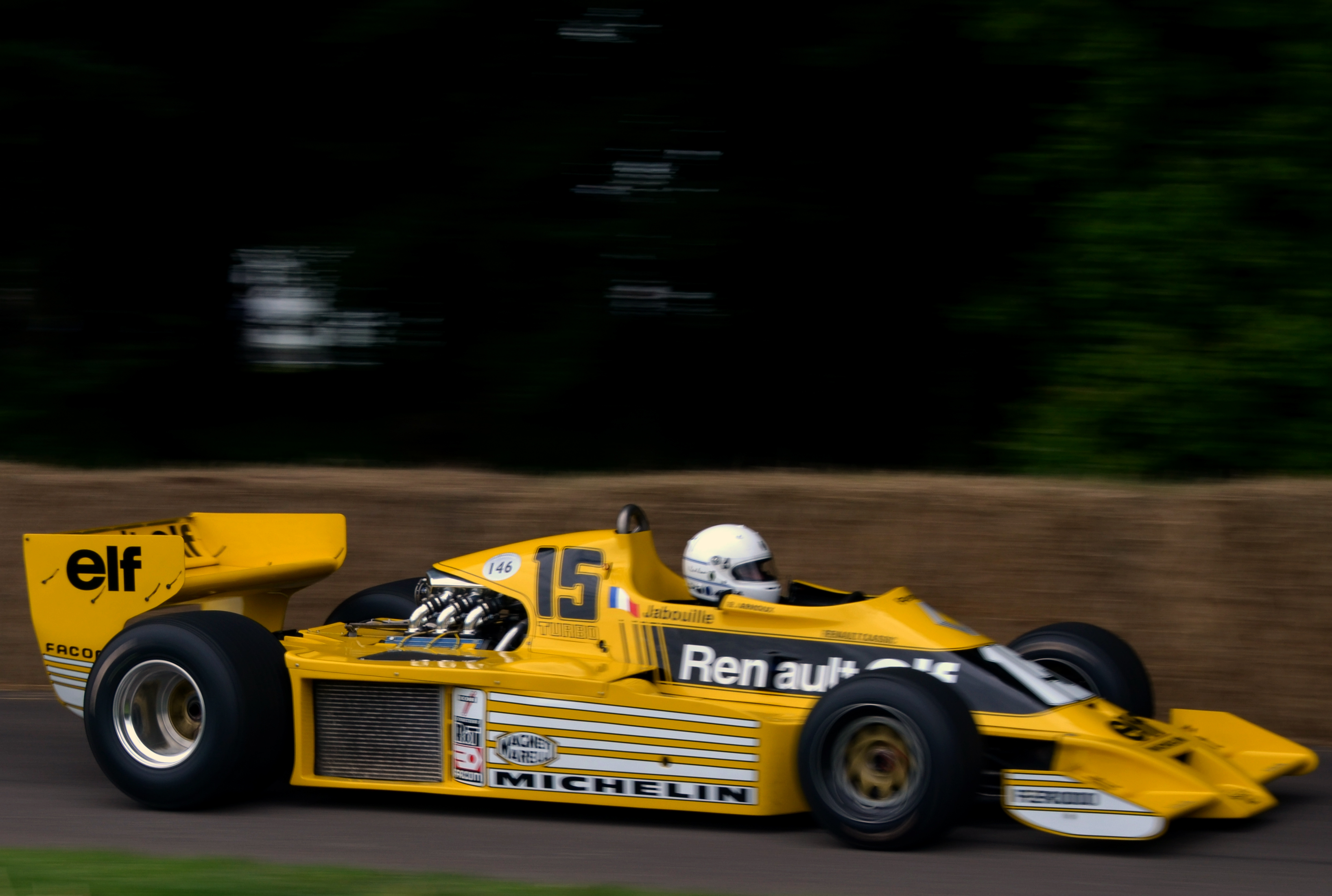
Renault RS01 at Goodwood 2012

From 1977 to 1986 and again between 1989 and 1997, Renault Sport was in charge of Renault's Formula One programme. Renault Sport F1, created at the end of 2010 and active until 2015, was a subsequent incarnation of Renault's involvement in Formula One and was headquartered in Viry-Châtillon, which functioned as a semi-independent operation. In 2016, the Formula One operation became part of Renault Sport Racing. In September 2020, the Renault company said it would repurpose the F1 team to promote Alpine.

=== Formula Two ===
Alpine constructed various chassis and prepared engines for Formula Two (F2). In 1973, Renault-Gordini (later Renault Sport) introduced a two-litre V6 engine for F2, the CH, which was the basis of its future Le Mans and F1 engines. Jean-Pierre Jabouille and René Arnoux won the 1976 and 1977 European Formula Two Championships with Renault-powered cars.

==== Results of Renault Sport as an engine supplier ====
===== 1976 =====
(key) (Races in bold indicate pole position; races in italics indicate fastest lap)

Entrant	Chassis	Engine	Drivers	1	2	3	4	5	6	7	8	9	10	11	12	Driver's Championship	Points
Écurie Renault Elf	Martini MK16/MK19	Renault-Gordini CH1		(West Germany)	(United Kingdom)	(Italy)	(Austria)	(France)	(West Germany)	(France)	(Italy)	(Italy)	(Portugal)	(France)	(West Germany)	Driver's Championship	Points
Écurie Renault Elf	Martini MK16/MK19	Renault-Gordini CH1	(France) Patrick Tambay	3	3	2	3	**Ret**	3	Ret	3	**Ret**	Ret	1	Ret	3rd	39
Écurie Renault Elf	Martini MK16/MK19	Renault-Gordini CH1	(France) René Arnoux	2	7	Ret	4	1	5	10	2	1	**1**	Ret	3	2nd	52
Equipe Elf Switzerland	Elf 2J	Renault-Gordini CH1	(France) Jean-Pierre Jabouille	Ret	14	**1**	6	3	4	2	**1**	4	2	**Ret**	**1**	1st	53
Equipe Elf Switzerland	Elf 2J	Renault-Gordini CH1	(France) Michel Leclère	Ret	Ret	4	1	Ret	2	Ret	Ret	Ret	8	3	2	4th	33

===== 1977 =====
(key) (Races in bold indicate pole position; races in italics indicate fastest lap)

Entrant	Chassis	Engine	Drivers	1	2	3	4	5	6	7	8	9	10	11	12	13	Driver's Championship	Points
Écurie Renault Elf	Martini MK22	Renault-Gordini CH1		(United Kingdom)	(United Kingdom)	(West Germany)	(West Germany)	(Italy)	(France)	(Italy)	(France)	(France)	(Italy)	(Italy)	(Portugal)	(United Kingdom)	Driver's Championship	Points
Écurie Renault Elf	Martini MK22	Renault-Gordini CH1	(France) René Arnoux	1	Ret	2	5	Ret	1	16	Ret	**1**	Ret	1	2	6	1st	52
Écurie Renault Elf	Martini MK22	Renault-Gordini CH1	(France) Didier Pironi	Ret	Ret	Ret	4	2	2	Ret	3	Ret	4	5	**1**	3	3rd	38
Willy Kauhsen Renault Elf Racing Team	Kauhsen (Elf 2J)	Renault-Gordini CH1	(France) Michel Leclère	**Ret**	Ret	Ret	DNS	Ret	Ret	DNS	DNQ	15		DNQ	10		—	0
Willy Kauhsen Renault Elf Racing Team	Kauhsen (Elf 2J)	Renault-Gordini CH1	(West Germany) Klaus Ludwig	Ret	Ret	Ret	8	DSQ	7								—	0
Willy Kauhsen Renault Elf Racing Team	Kauhsen (Elf 2J)	Renault-Gordini CH1	(France) José Dolhem								Ret						—	0
Willy Kauhsen Renault Elf Racing Team	Kauhsen (Elf 2J)	Renault-Gordini CH1	(France) Alain Prost									10			Ret		—	0
Willy Kauhsen Renault Elf Racing Team	Kauhsen (Elf 2J)	Renault-Gordini CH1	(Italy) Vittorio Brambilla											Ret			—	0
Willy Kauhsen Renault Elf Racing Team	Kauhsen (Elf 2J)	Renault-Gordini CH1	(Portugal) Mário Silva												DNQ		—	0

Note: During this season Scuderia Everest also entered Renault-powered cars, although those were not supplied by Renault Sport.

=== Formula Three ===
Gordini and Alpine-tuned Renault engines were used in various Formula Three (F3) series since the 1960s. Alpine (a partially owned subsidiary of Renault since 1973) also developed cars for the category. In 1979, Alain Prost won the FIA European Formula Three Championship with a Renault engine prepared by Oreca. The last victory of a Renault engine before its withdrawal from the formula at the end of 2003 was in the 2003 Macau Grand Prix with a Sodemo-tuned unit from a Signature Team's Dallara car driven by Nicolas Lapierre.

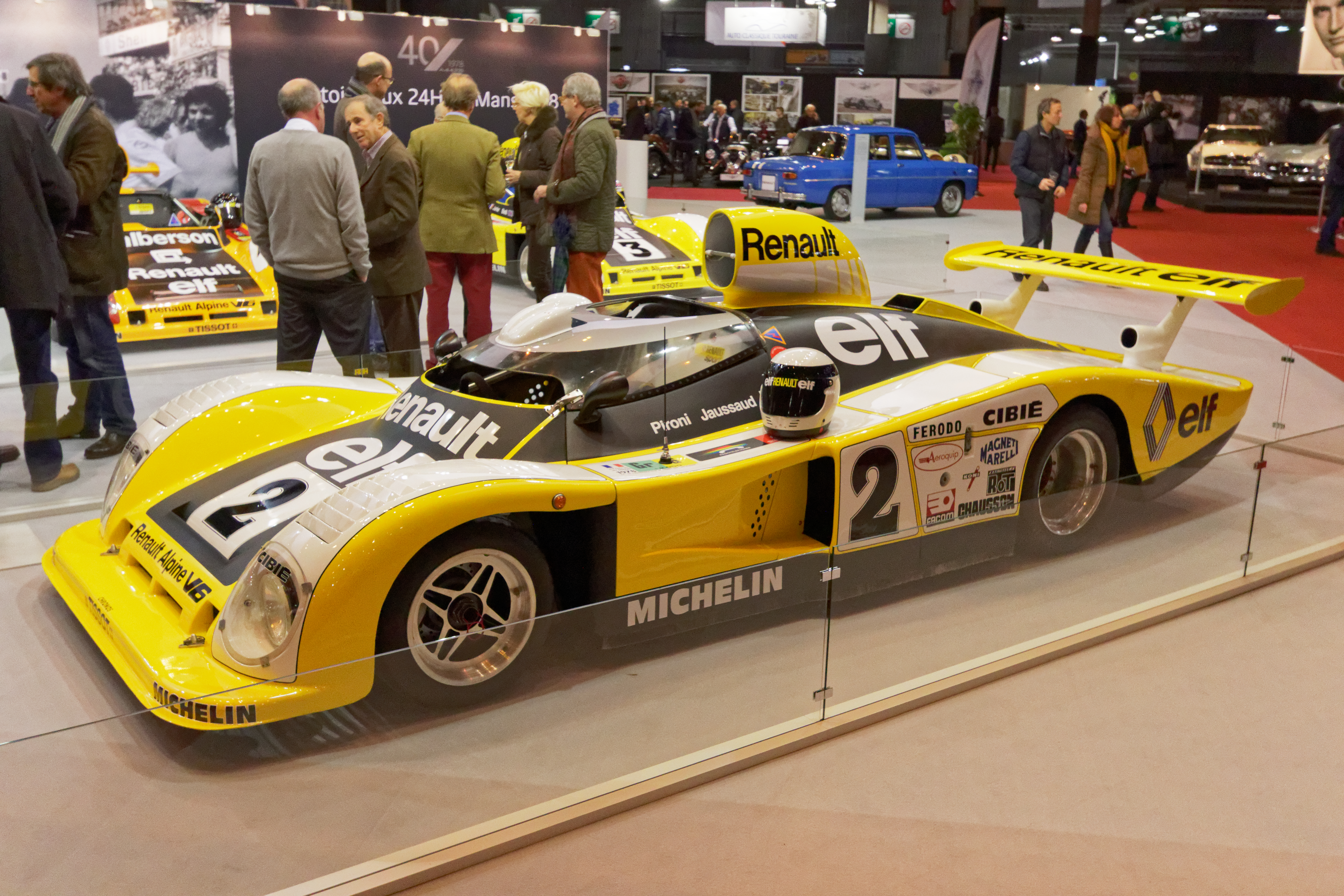
Renault Alpine A442B - 1978

Renault Sport Technologies announced its return to F3 as an engine supplier with Oreca again as engine tuner for the 2014 FIA European Formula Three Championship. However, this was indefinitely halted because of the lack of power of the Oreca-tuned engine compared to rivals.

=== Sportscars ===
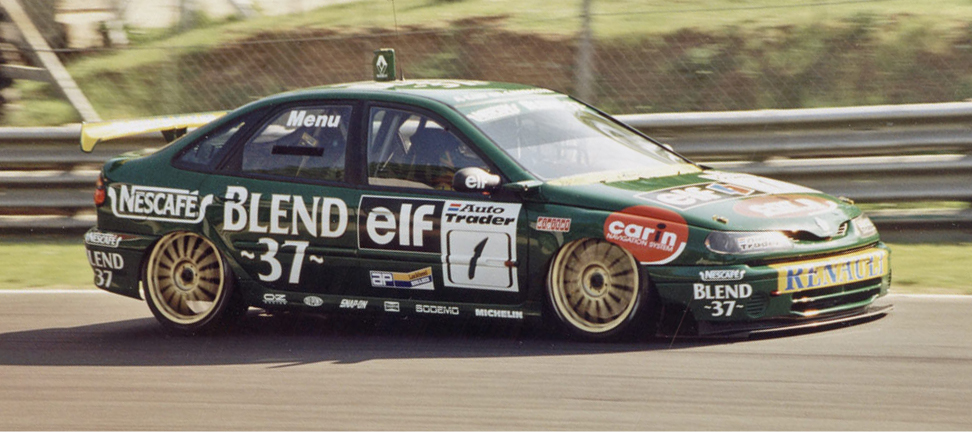
Alain Menu driving for Renault in the 1998 British Touring Car Championship season

Renault Sport was responsible for Renault's sports car racing entries during the 1970s, including their win at the 1978 24 Hours of Le Mans race with the Renault Alpine A442.

=== Touring cars ===
Capitalising on the growing reputation and success of the Super Touring regulations introduced in the early 1990s, Renault made the decision to enter the British Touring Car Championship in 1993 with reigning champion Tim Harvey and Alain Menu signed as their drivers. Renault's first BTCC effort was based on the Renault 19 chassis, initially developed by test driver Jean Ragnotti. Success was almost immediate as Harvey and Menu scored a win each in 1993, before the 19 was replaced with the new Renault Laguna for 1994. The Laguna lent itself as a more competitive proposition than its predecessor and went on to be a highly successful car throughout its racing life, the highlight being in 1997 when Alain Menu took 12 victories on his way to the championship.

=== Hillclimbing ===
In 2011, a Dacia Duster car prepared for Renault Sport Technologies, Sodemo and Tork Engineering and fitted with a Nissan GT-R engine participated at the Pike's Peak hillclimbing.

=== Car manufacturing ===
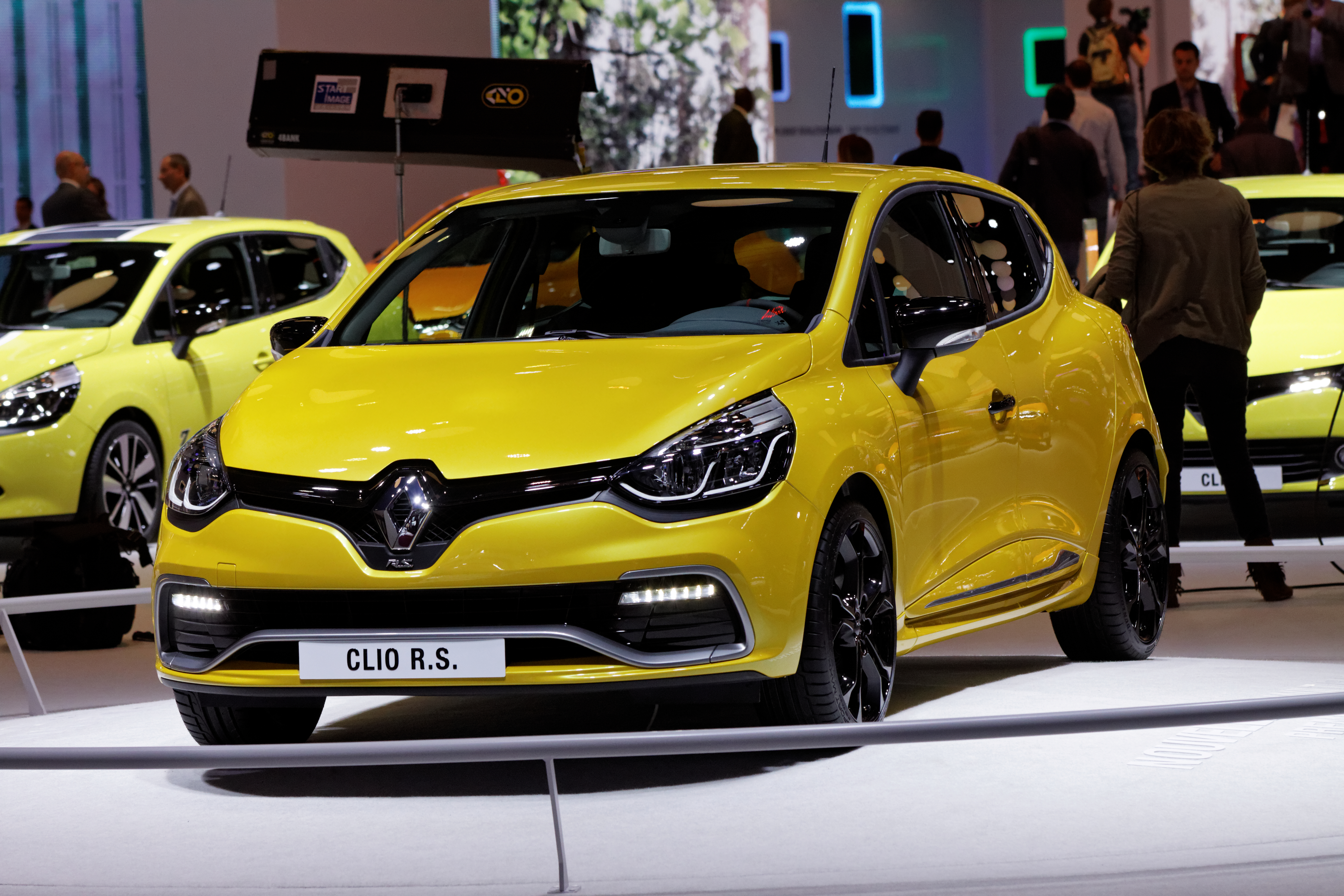
Renault Clio RS 2012

In 1994, Renault discontinued the Alpine marque, badging since then its sport cars manufactured at the Dieppe factory as Renault Sport, beginning with the Renault Sport Spider in 1996. The production of Renault Sport cars for the mainstream markets at Dieppe ended in 2018. Renault Sport models are also produced at Renault Spain's Palencia factory (Mégane Renault Sport).

==== Former models ====
- Spider (1996–1999)
- Clio Renault Sport (1998–2018)
- Twingo GT (2016–2019)
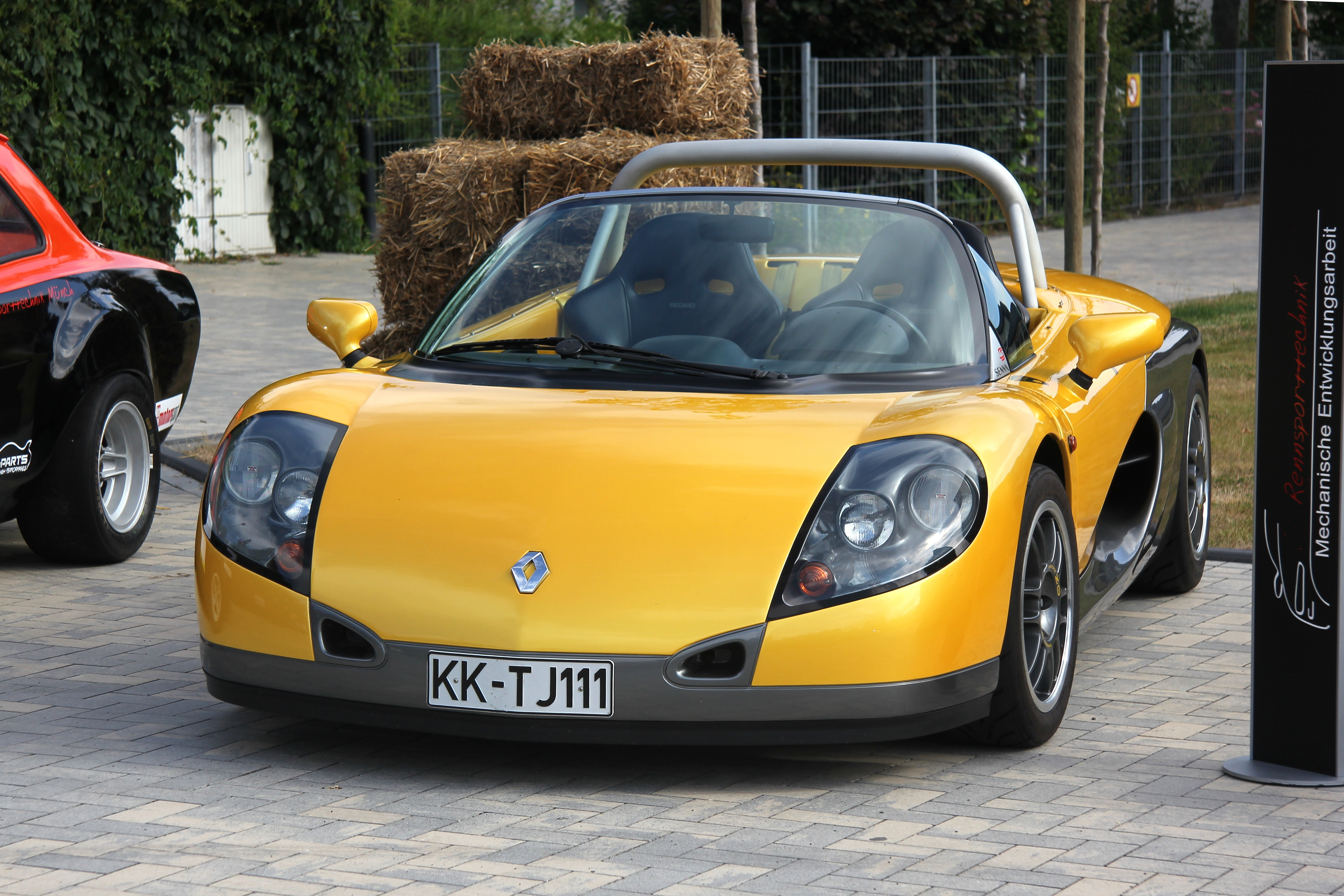
- Renault Sport Spider
  Twingo Renault Sport (2011–2013)
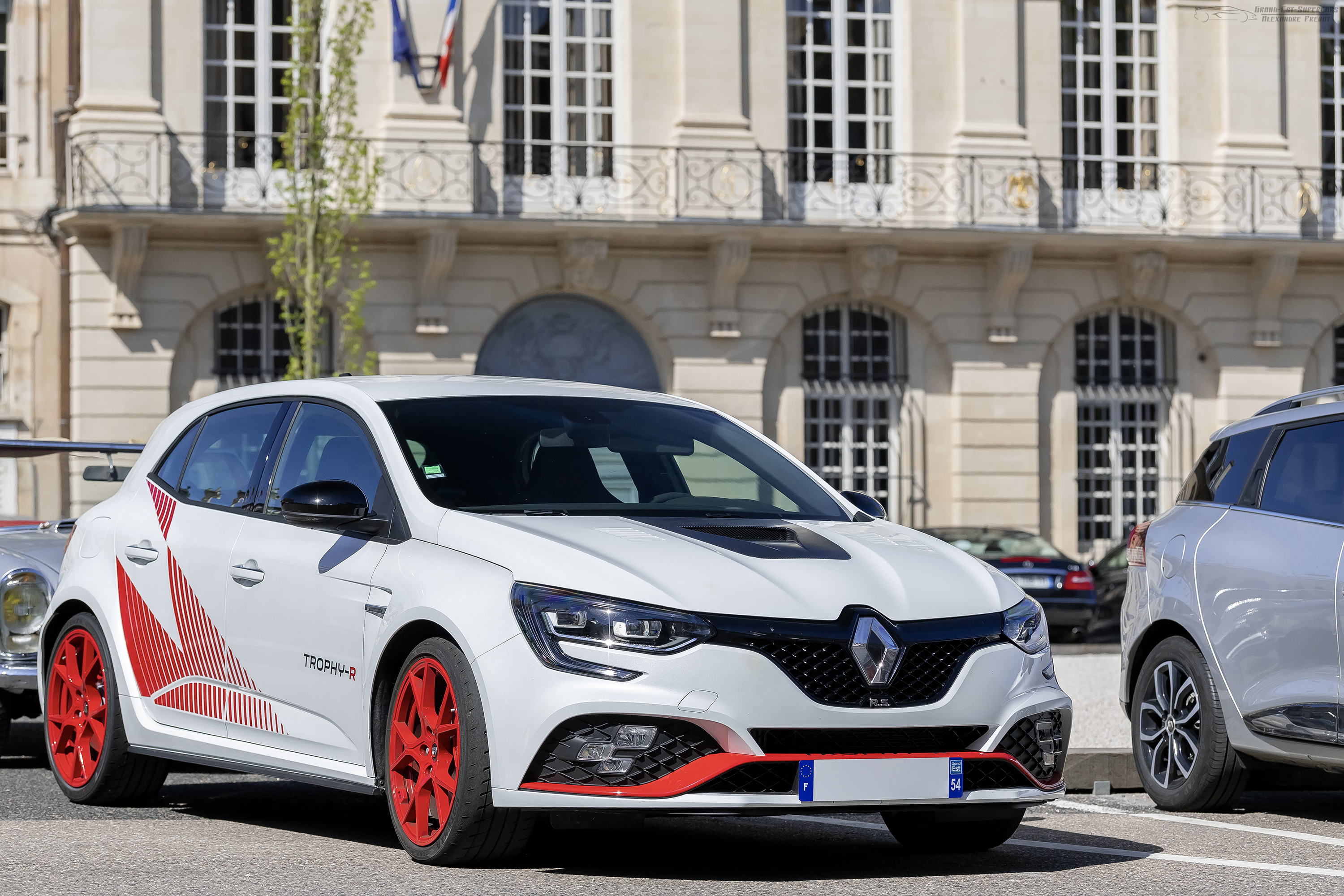
- Renault Megane RS Trophy-R
  Sandero RS (2015–2021; only South America)
- Clio GT/RS Line (2013–2023)
- Megane GT/RS Line (2010–2023)
- Megane Renault Sport (2004–2023)
- Arkana RS Line (2021–2023)
- Captur RS Line (2021–2023)

== Divisions ==
Renault Sport is in charge of the conception and manufacturing of the Gordini-badged sport cars and also of modifying cars and vans for special purposes (transporting people with reduced mobility, driving school cars, business fleets) through its division Renault Tech.

== Sites ==
- Les Ulis (car development, management)
- Viry-Châtillon (racing car development, marketing)

== Activities ==
- Manufacturer of limited edition sport and special purpose models
- Competitor in motorsport events, for example:
  - Rallying
  - Organisation of single-model vehicle championships
- Organiser or/and sponsor of the Formula Renault national and international championships
- Organiser of the Renault Sport Series on circuits
- Former shareholder in SMA Engines; an aircraft engine manufacturer, an alliance of RST, EADS and SAFRAN

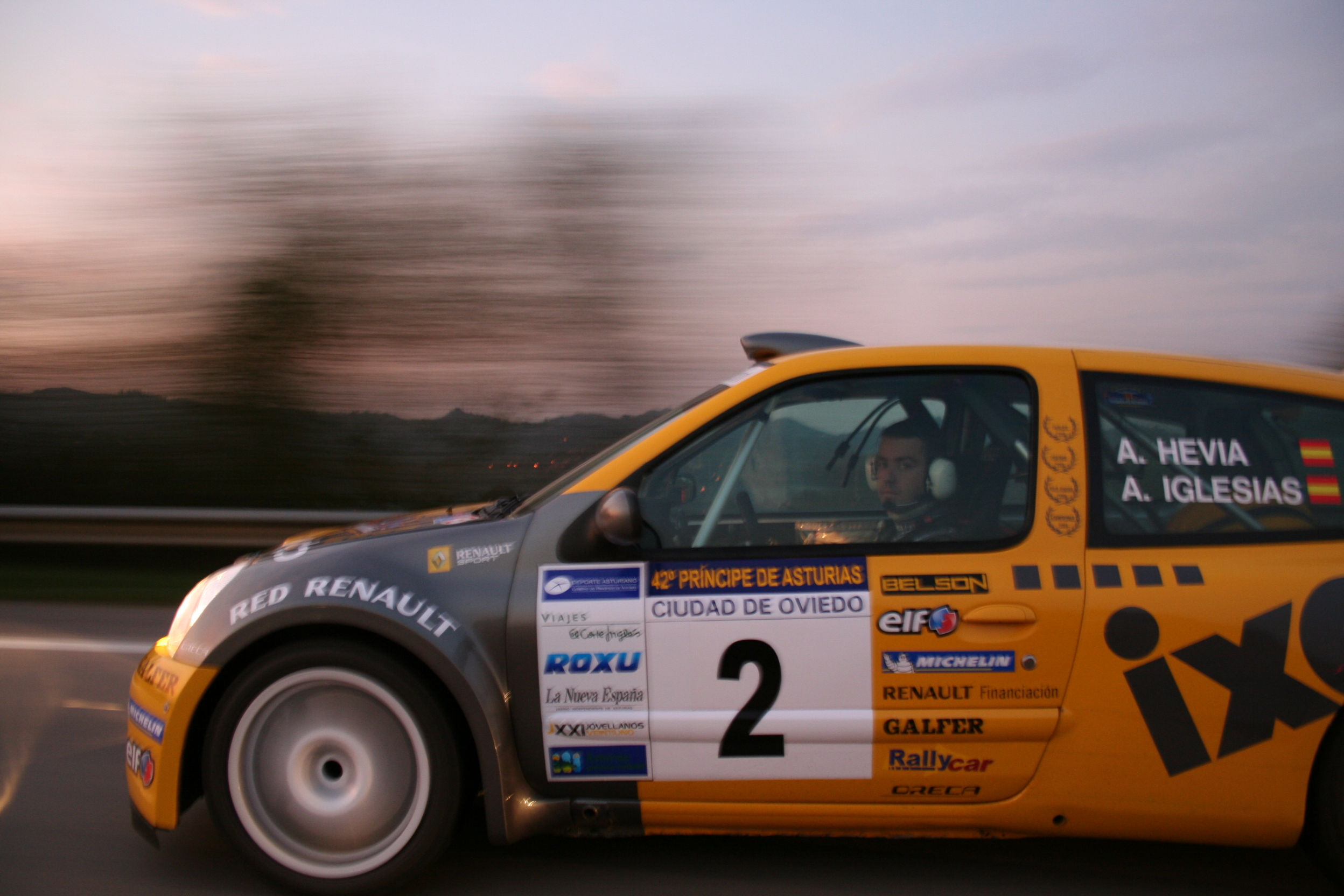
Renault Clio S1600, Rally Príncipe de Asturias, 2005

=== Championships ===
Renault Sport organises several national and international one-make racing championships.

- Formula Renault 2.0L and 1.6L
- Renault Clio Cup
- Dacia Logan Cup

== International ==
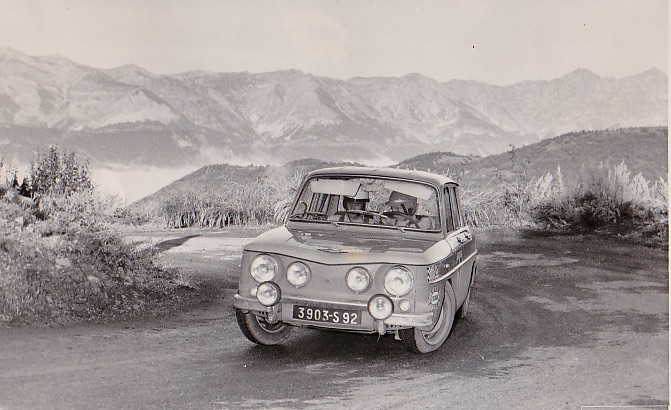
Renault 8 Gordini Coupe des Alpes 1968

Many international subsidiaries of Renault have their own Renault Sport division, including Renault UK, Renault Argentina, Renault Spain and Renault Italy, among others.

== Renault in motorsport ==
Renault is also involved in other racing series but not as Renault Sport.

- Renault Clio
  - French Super Production Championship
  - Belgian Procar Championship
  - BTCC with Renault Laguna Williams
  - Endurance Touring Car Series
- Renault Mégane/Renault Fluence
  - TC2000 Argentina (1984–2011, currently the participation is in charge of the local Renault Sport branch).
- Renault Spider:
  - Spanish GT Championship (1999?–2000?)
- Renault 8 Gordini:
  - Springbok Series (1966–1971)
- Renault 4CV
  - 24 hours of Le Mans (1949–1954)
  - Renault Alpine A110: In 1971 Alpine achieved a 1–2–3 finish in the Monte Carlo rally, using cars with engines derived from the Renault 16. In 1973, they repeated the 1–2–3 Monte Carlo result and went on to win the World Rally championship outright.
