= ToJ =

German auto racing team and constructor

ToJ was a German racing car constructor, founded by Jörg Obermoser. Obermoser began with selling open wheel racing cars for Formula Two and Formula Three, and later diversified into sports racing cars. New designs continued until 1982 with the final ToJ SC390 car powered by a Cosworth DFV for Group C sportscar racing for the World Endurance Championship and the Germany-based Interserie.

Works ToJ cars competed in the European Formula Two Championship in 1976.
