= Michel Leclère =

French racing driver (born 1946)

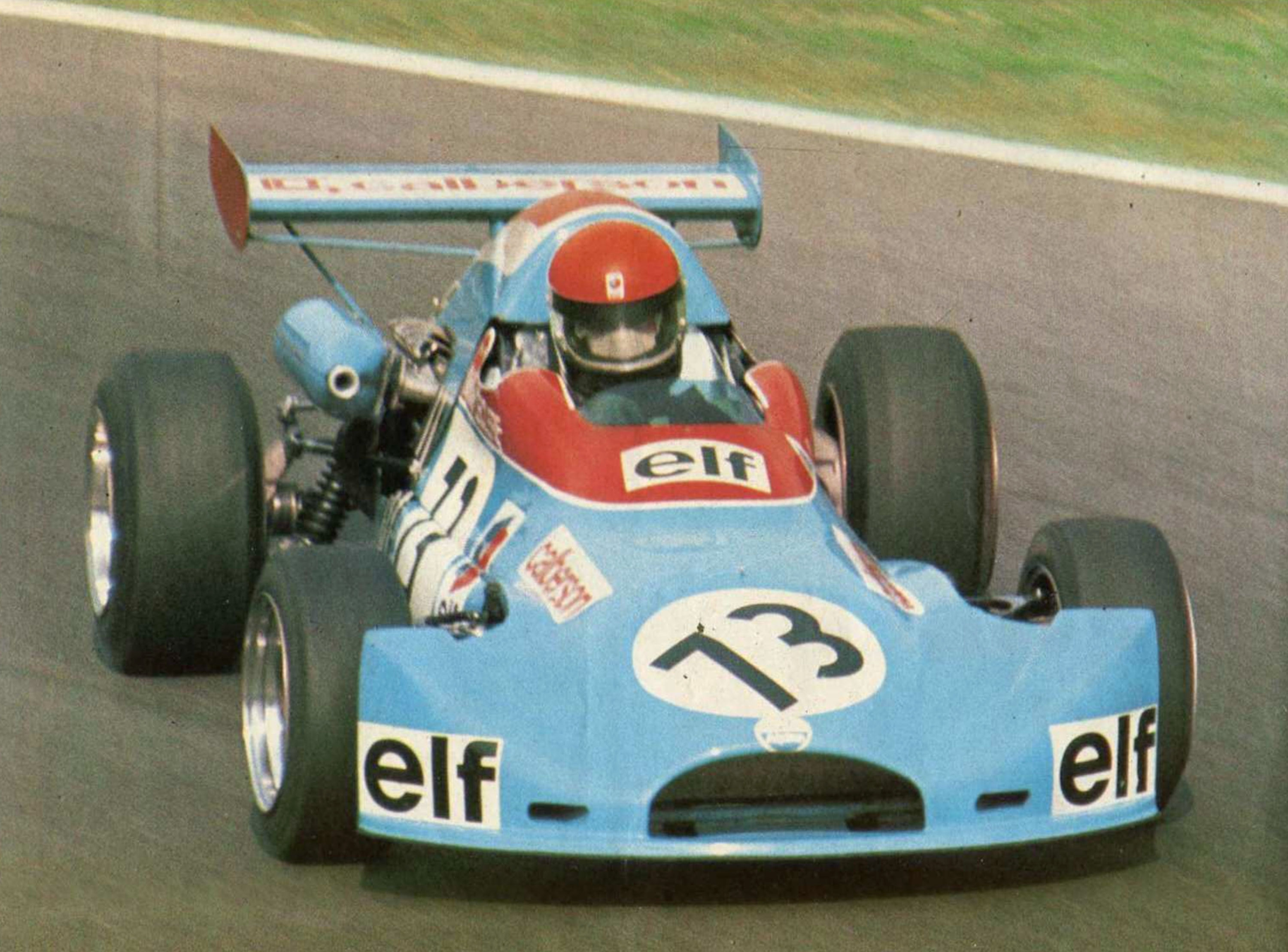
- Leclère in an Alpine A364 in Monza for the 1973 Italian Formula 3 Championship
- Born: 18 March 1946 (age 80); Mantes-la-Jolie, Yvelines, France

Formula One World Championship career
- Nationality: (France) French
- Active years: 1975–1976
- Team(s): Tyrrell, Wolf–Williams
- Entries: 8 (7 starts)
- Championships: 0
- Wins: 0
- Podiums: 0
- Career points: 0
- Pole positions: 0
- Fastest laps: 0
- First entry: 1975 United States Grand Prix
- Last entry: 1976 French Grand Prix

24 Hours of Le Mans career
- Years: 1972, 1977 – 1979
- Teams: Ligier; Grand Touring Cars Inc. JMS Racing
- Best finish: DNF
- Class wins: 0

Michel Leclère (born 18 March 1946) is a former motor racing driver from France. He competed in eight Formula One Grands Prix, making his debut on October 5, 1975. However, he did not score any championship points during his career.

== Career ==
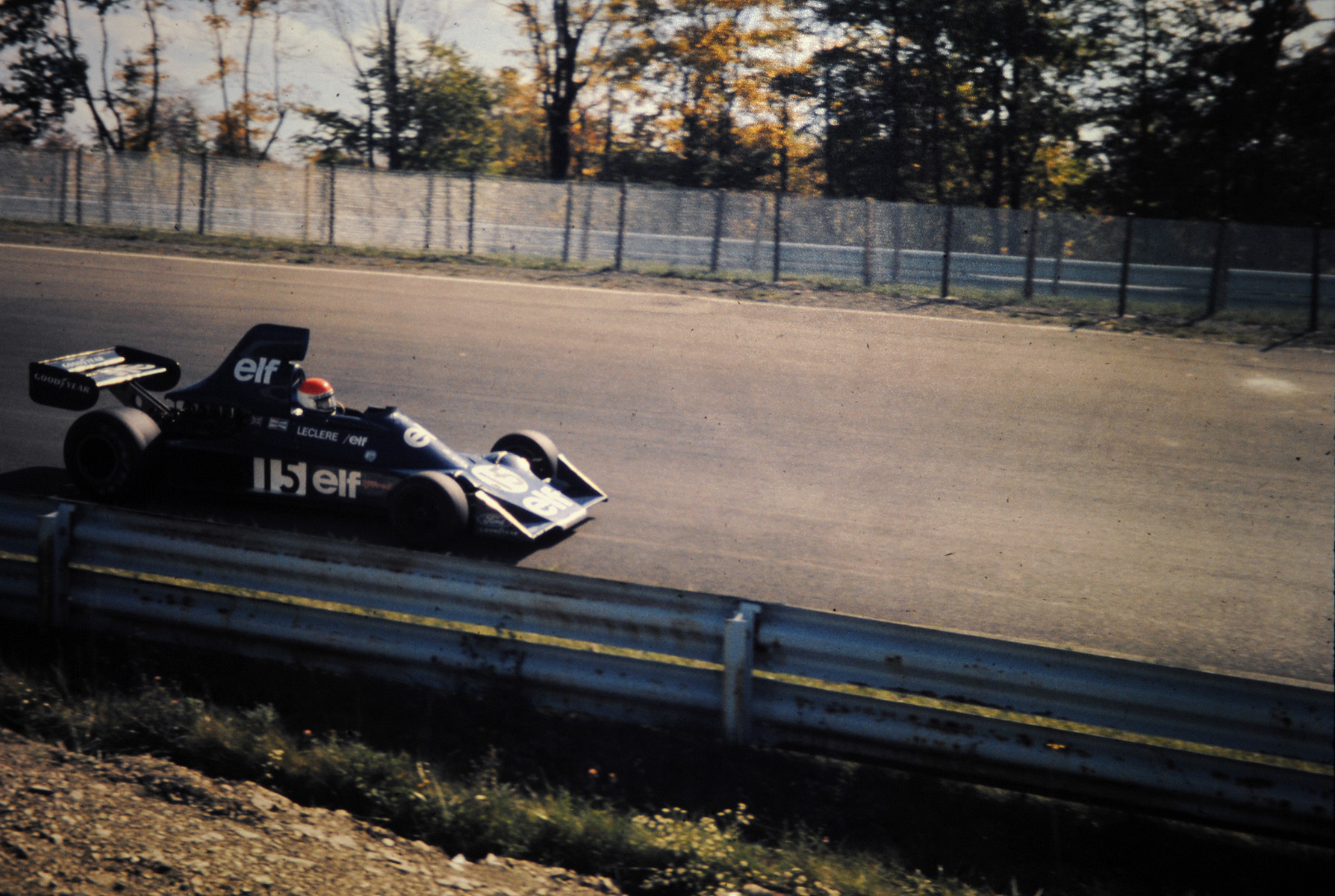
Leclère driving for Tyrrell at the 1975 United States Grand Prix

After winning the French Formula 3 Championship, driving for Alpine, in 1972, Leclère performed well in Formula 2. This earned him his chance in Formula One. After making his debut for Tyrrell at the last race of the 1975 season he landed a full-time drive with Wolf–Williams Racing in 1976. The relationship was not a success, however, and he returned to Formula 2. After a bad season with Kauhsen in 1977, he retired.

Leclère has recently been involved with the Renault H&C Classic Team and has demonstrated and raced some of the historic Formula One cars and other machinery in their keeping, at various events around Europe.

== Racing record ==
=== Complete European Formula Two Championship results ===
(key) (Races in bold indicate pole position; races in italics indicate fastest lap)

Year	Entrant	Chassis	Engine	1	2	3	4	5	6	7	8	9	10	11	12	13	14	15	16	17	Pos.	Pts
1973	Elf John Coombs	Alpine A367	Ford	MAL	HOC	THR	NÜR	PAU	KIN	NIV	HOC	ROU	MNZ	MAN	KAR	PER	SAL	NOR	ALB; Ret	VAL	NC	0
1974	Ecurie Elf	Alpine A367	BMW	BAR; 6	HOC; 3	PAU; 5	SAL		MUG; 16	KAR; Ret	PER; 4	HOC; 10	VAL; DNS								6th	12
1974	March Racing Team	March 742	BMW					HOC; 5													6th	12
1975	March Engineering	March 752	BMW	**EST**; Ret	THR; 7	HOC; 10	NÜR; Ret	PAU; 5	HOC; Ret	**SAL**; Ret	ROU; 1	MUG; Ret	PER; Ret	**SIL**; 1	ZOL; 1	NOG; 2	**VAL**; Ret				**2nd**	**36**
1976	Ecurie Elf	Elf 2J	Renault	HOC; Ret	THR; Ret	VAL; 4	SAL; 1	PAU; Ret	HOC; 2	ROU; Ret	MUG; Ret	PER; Ret	EST; 8	NOG; 3	HOC; 2						4th	33
1977	Willi Kauhsen Racing Team	Elf 2J	Renault	**SIL**; Ret	THR; Ret	HOC; Ret	NÜR; DNS	VAL; Ret	PAU; Ret	MUG; DNS	ROU; DNQ	NOG; 15	PER	MIS; DNQ	EST; 10	DON					NC	0
1978	Fred Opert Racing	Chevron B42	Hart	THR	HOC	NÜR	PAU	MUG	VAL	ROU; DNQ	DON	NOG	PER	MIS	HOC						NC	0
1979	Polifac BMW Junior Team	March 792	BMW	SIL	HOC	THR	NÜR	VAL	MUG	PAU; Ret	HOC	ZAN	PER	MIS	DON						NC	0

=== Complete Formula One results ===
(key)

Year	Entrant	Chassis	Engine	1	2	3	4	5	6	7	8	9	10	11	12	13	14	15	16	WDC	Pts
1975	Elf Team Tyrrell	Tyrrell 007	Ford Cosworth DFV 3.0 V8	ARG	BRA	RSA	ESP	MON	BEL	SWE	NED	FRA	GBR	GER	AUT	ITA	USA; Ret			NC	0
1976	Frank Williams Racing Cars	Wolf–Williams FW05	Ford Cosworth DFV 3.0 V8	BRA	RSA; 13	USW; DNQ														NC	0
1976	Walter Wolf Racing	Wolf–Williams FW05	Ford Cosworth DFV 3.0 V8				ESP; 10	BEL; 11	MON; 11	SWE; Ret	FRA; 13	GBR	GER	AUT	NED	ITA	CAN	USA	JPN	NC	0

=== 24 Hours of Le Mans results ===
Year	Team	Co-Drivers	Car	Class	Laps	Pos.	Class Pos.
1974	(France) Automobiles Ligier	(France) Guy Chasseuil	Ligier JS2	S 3.0		DNF	DNF
1977	(United States) Grand Touring Cars Inc. (France) Mirage Renault	(United States) Sam Posey	Mirage GR8	S 3.0	58	DNF	DNF
1978	(United States) Grand Touring Cars Inc.	(United States) Sam Posey	Mirage M9	S+2.0	33	DNF	DNF
1979	(France) JMS Racing (France) Charles Pozzi	(France) Claude Ballot-Léna (United States) Peter Gregg	Ferrari 512BB/LM	IMSA +2.5	219	DNF	DNF

Sporting positions
Preceded by Inaugural	Critérium de Formule Renault; Champion; 1971	Succeeded by Jacques Laffite
Preceded by Patrick Depailler	French Formula Three; Champion; 1972	Succeeded by Jacques Laffite
