= 1978 British Formula Three season =

Seasons
- ← 1977 1979 →

The 1978 British Formula Three season was the 28th season of the British Formula Three racing. There was once again two major championships contested throughout the year: the British Automobile Racing Club organised BP Super Visco British Formula 3 Championship, and the British Racing Drivers' Club backed Vandervell British Formula 3 Championship. This would be the final year with multiple British championship, with the BARC and BRDC unifying for the following season.

The BARC championship was won by Brazilian driver Nelson Piquet ahead of British driver Derek Warwick, whilst in the BRDC championship, Warwick triumphed over Piquet. Piquet subsequently moved up into Formula One during the same year, driving for the Brabham team in the final Formula 1 race of the season as well as two other teams earlier.

== BP Super Visco British F3 Championship ==
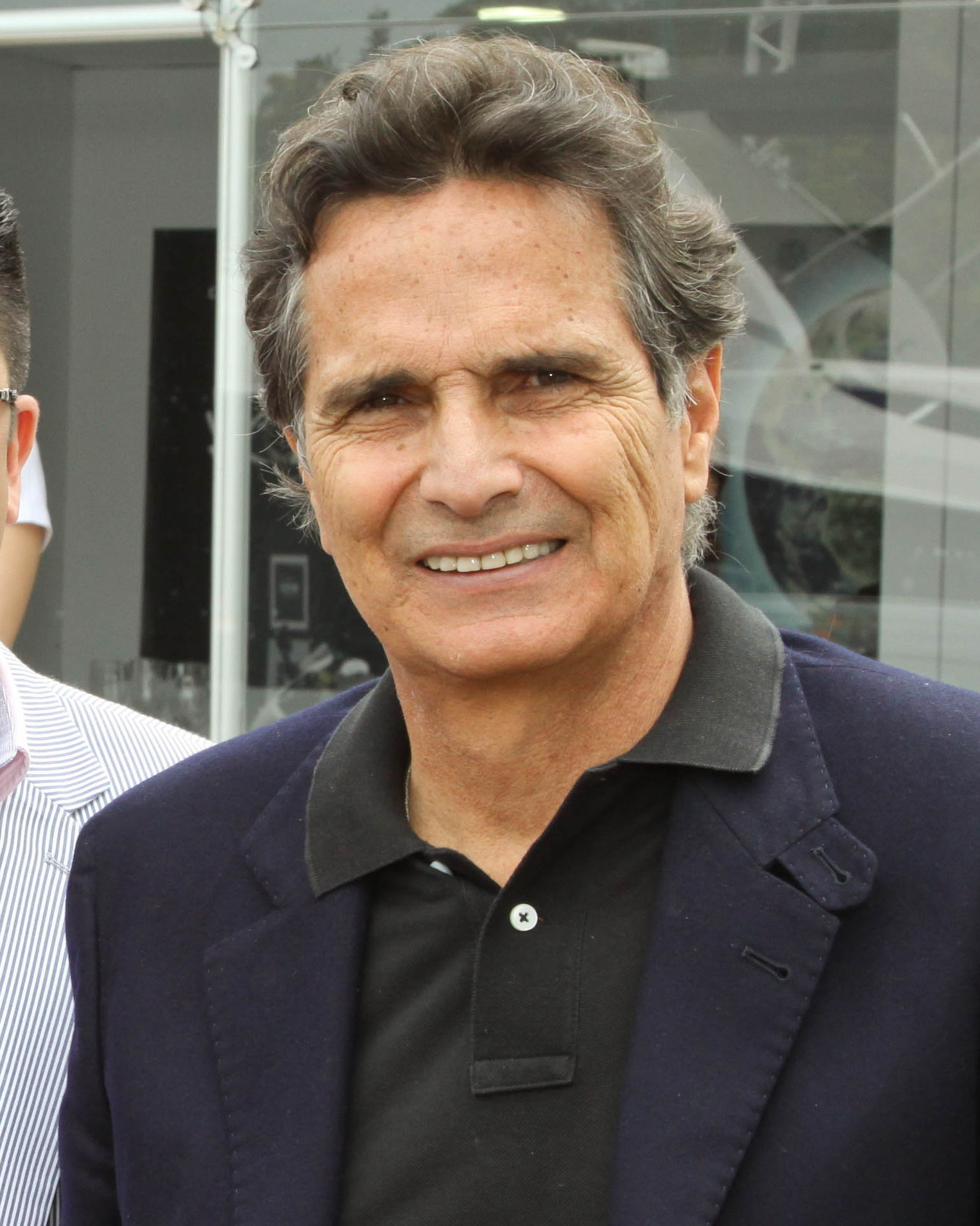
BP Super Visco British F3 champion, Nelson Piquet

The BARC championship was run over 17 rounds, held at ten different circuits across England and in Monaco and France. The champion was Brazilian Nelson Piquet, ahead of BRDC series champion Derek Warwick

=== Calendar and results ===
Round	Date	Circuit	Winning driver	Winning team	Winning car	Ref.
R1	12 March	(United Kingdom) Thruxton Circuit	(United Kingdom) Derek Warwick	Warwick Trailers	Ralt RT1/77 - Toyota	
R2	27 March	(United Kingdom) Thruxton Circuit	(United Kingdom) Derek Warwick	Warwick Trailers	Ralt RT1/77 - Toyota	
R3	16 April	(United Kingdom) Brands Hatch	(United Kingdom) Derek Warwick	Warwick Trailers	Ralt RT1/77 - Toyota	
R4	22 April	(United Kingdom) Oulton Park	(Brazil) Chico Serra	Sadia Racing with Project Four	March 783 - Toyota	
R5	30 April	(United Kingdom) Donington Park	(Brazil) Nelson Piquet	Brastemp/Armo/Hobby	Ralt RT1/78 - Toyota	
R6	6 May	Circuit de Monaco	(Italy) Elio de Angelis	Everest Racing Team	Chevron B38 - Toyota	
R7	14 May	(United Kingdom) Mallory Park	(Brazil) Nelson Piquet	Brastemp/Armo/Hobby	Ralt RT1/78 - Toyota	
R8	29 May	(United Kingdom) Thruxton Circuit	(Brazil) Nelson Piquet	Brastemp/Armo/Hobby	Ralt RT1/78 - Toyota	
R9	11 June	(United Kingdom) Brands Hatch	(Brazil) Nelson Piquet	Brastemp/Armo/Hobby	Ralt RT1/78 - Toyota	
R10	25 June	(United Kingdom) Cadwell Park	(Brazil) Nelson Piquet	Brastemp/Armo/Hobby	Ralt RT1/78 - Toyota	
R11	2 July	(France) Circuit Paul Ricard	(Brazil) Nelson Piquet	Brastemp/Armo/Hobby	Ralt RT1/78 - Toyota	
R12	9 July	(United Kingdom) Silverstone Circuit	(Brazil) Nelson Piquet	Brastemp/Armo/Hobby	Ralt RT1/78 - Toyota	
R13	15 July	(United Kingdom) Brands Hatch	(Brazil) Chico Serra	Sadia Racing with Project Four	March 783 - Toyota	
R14	23 July	(United Kingdom) Donington Park	(United Kingdom) Derek Warwick	Warwick Trailers	Ralt RT1/77 - Toyota	
R15	24 September	(United Kingdom) Snetterton Motor Racing Circuit	(Brazil) Nelson Piquet	Brastemp/Armo/Hobby	Ralt RT1/78 - Toyota	
R16	15 October	(United Kingdom) Mallory Park	(New Zealand) Rob Wilson	International Computers Limited - Royal Grafton China	Ralt RT1/78 - Toyota	
R17	29 October	(United Kingdom) Thruxton Circuit	(Brazil) Chico Serra	Sadia Racing with Project Four	March 783 - Toyota	

=== Final championship standings ===
Points were awarded to the top six drivers in each race as follows:

1st	2nd	3rd	4th	5th	6th	Fastest lap
9	6	4	3	2	1	1

Pos.	Driver	Entrant	Car-Engine	Points
1	(Brazil) Nelson Piquet	Brastemp / Arno Hobby	Ralt RT1/78 - Toyota	101
2	(United Kingdom) Derek Warwick	Warwick Trailers	Ralt RT1/77 - Toyota	72
3	(Brazil) Chico Serra	Sadia Racing with Project Four	March 783 - Toyota	72
4	(United Kingdom) Philip Bullmann	Alan Docking Racing; Unipart Racing Team	Chevron B38 - Toyota; March 783 - Triumph Dolomite/Swindon	22
4	(United Kingdom) Tiff Needell	Unipart Racing Team	March 783 - Triumph Dolomite/Swindon	22
6	(New Zealand) Rob Wilson	International Computers Limited - Royal Grafton China	Ralt RT1/78 - Toyota	20
7	(Italy) Andrea de Cesaris	Marlboro Team Tiga	Ralt RT1/76 - Toyota	19
8	(Sweden) Stefan Johansson	Anglia Cars Ltd	Argo JM1 - Toyota	15
9	(Netherlands) Huub Rothengatter	Racing Team Holland; Alan Docking Racing	Ralt RT1/78 - Toyota; Chevron B38 - Toyota	11
9	(Denmark) Thorkild Thyrring	Marlboro	Ralt RT1/78 - Toyota	11
11	(France) Jacques Coulon	Martini Moutl - Jacques Coulon	Martini Mk 21 - Toyota	10
11	(Italy) Elio de Angelis	Scuderia Everest	Chevron B38 - Toyota	10
13	(France) Alain Prost	Écurie Elf	Martini Mk 21 - Renault Gordini/Dudot	7
13	(United Kingdom) Ian Taylor	Unipart Racing Team	March 783 - Triumph Dolomite/Swindon	7
15	(United Kingdom) John Bright	Rugby Finance (Midlands) Ltd; Twinsocks with McRitchie of Edinburgh	Wheatcroft R18 - Toyota; March 773 - Toyota	6
15	(United Kingdom) Jim Crawford	Toyota Switzerland	Chevron B43 - Toyota	6
15	(Italy) Siegfried Stohr	Trivellato Racing Team	Chevron B43 - Toyota	6
18	(Italy) Daniele Albertin	Scuderia Del Lario	Ralt RT1 - Toyota	4
19	(United Kingdom) Ian Flux	Cloud Engineering	Ralt RT1 - Toyota; March 773 - Toyota	3
19	(United Kingdom) Nigel Mansell	March Racing Team	March 783 - Toyota	3
19	(Spain) Pedro Nogues	Rushen Green Racing	March 783 - Toyota	3
19	(South Africa) Trevor van Rooyen	Unipart Racing Team; SDC Builders	March 783 - Triumph Dolomite/Swindon; March 783 - Toyota	3
23	(Australia) Geoff Brabham	Brabham Racing Organisation / Esso	Ralt RT1 - Toyota	2
23	(Netherlands) Jan Lammers	Racing Team Holland	Ralt RT1 - Toyota	2
23	(New Zealand) Brett Riley	Dr. Joseph Ehrlich; Unipart Racing Team	Ehrlich RP4 - Toyota; March 783 - Triumph Dolomite/Swindon	2
26	(France) Patrick Bardinon	Écurie Elf	Martini Mk 21 - Toyota	1
26	(France) Philippe Colonna	Alan Docking Racing	Chevron B43 - Toyota	1
26	(United Kingdom) Derek Lawrence	Derek Lawrence	Chevron B38 - Chevrolet Vega/Titan	1
26	(France) Jean-Louis Schlesser	Jean-Louis Schlesser	Chevron B38 - Toyota	1

== Vandervell British F3 Championship ==
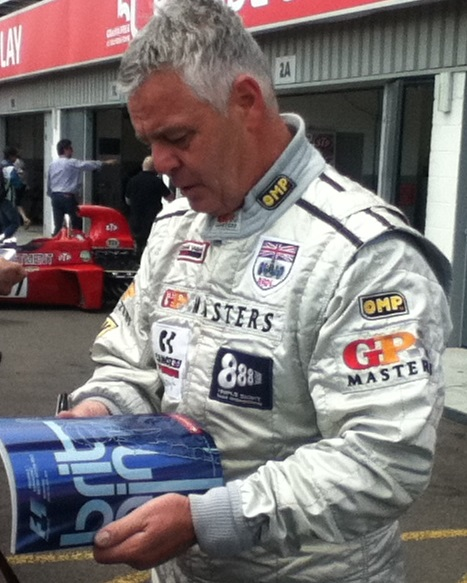
Vandervell British F3 champion, Derek Warwick

The BRDC championship was run over ten rounds, held at five different circuits across England. The champion was Englishman Derek Warwick, ahead of BARC series champion Nelson Piquet

=== Calendar and results ===
Round	Date	Circuit	Winning driver	Winning team	Winning car	Ref.
R1	5 March	(United Kingdom) Silverstone Circuit	(United Kingdom) Derek Warwick	Warwick Trailers	Ralt RT1/77 - Toyota	
R2	19 March	(United Kingdom) Silverstone Circuit	(Brazil) Nelson Piquet	Brastemp/Armo/Hobby	Ralt RT1/78 - Toyota	
R3	1 May	(United Kingdom) Silverstone Circuit	(Brazil) Chico Serra	Sadia Racing with Project Four	March 783 - Toyota	
R4	20 May	(United Kingdom) Oulton Park	(Brazil) Nelson Piquet	Brastemp/Armo/Hobby	Ralt RT1/78 - Toyota	
R5	13 August	(United Kingdom) Mallory Park	(United Kingdom) Derek Warwick	Warwick Trailers	Ralt RT1/77 - Toyota	
R6	26 August	(United Kingdom) Donington Park	(United Kingdom) Derek Warwick	Warwick Trailers	Ralt RT1/77 - Toyota	
R7	28 August	(United Kingdom) Silverstone Circuit	(Brazil) Nelson Piquet	Brastemp/Armo/Hobby	Ralt RT1/78 - Toyota	
R8	23 September	(United Kingdom) Silverstone Circuit	(Brazil) Nelson Piquet	Brastemp/Armo/Hobby	Ralt RT1/78 - Toyota	
R9	30 September	(United Kingdom) Silverstone Circuit	(Brazil) Nelson Piquet	Brastemp/Armo/Hobby	Ralt RT1/78 - Toyota	
R10	28 August	(United Kingdom) Brands Hatch	(United Kingdom) Derek Warwick	Warwick Trailers	Ralt RT1/77 - Toyota	

== Non-championship races ==
Race	Date	Circuit	Winning driver	Winning team	Winning car	Ref.
World Cup International F3 Race	9 April	(United Kingdom) Donington Park	(United Kingdom) Derek Warwick	Warwick Trailers	Ralt RT1/77 - Toyota	
Plastic Padding Formula 3 Trophy	11 November	(United Kingdom) Thruxton Circuit	(United Kingdom) Derek Warwick	Warwick Trailers	Ralt RT1/77 - Toyota	
