= 1980 BMW M1 Procar Championship =

Seasons
- ← 1979 none →

The 1980 BMW M1 Procar Championship was the second and final season of the BMW M1 Procar Championship. The series once again supported Formula One at various European rounds but also branched out to hosting its own standalone events.

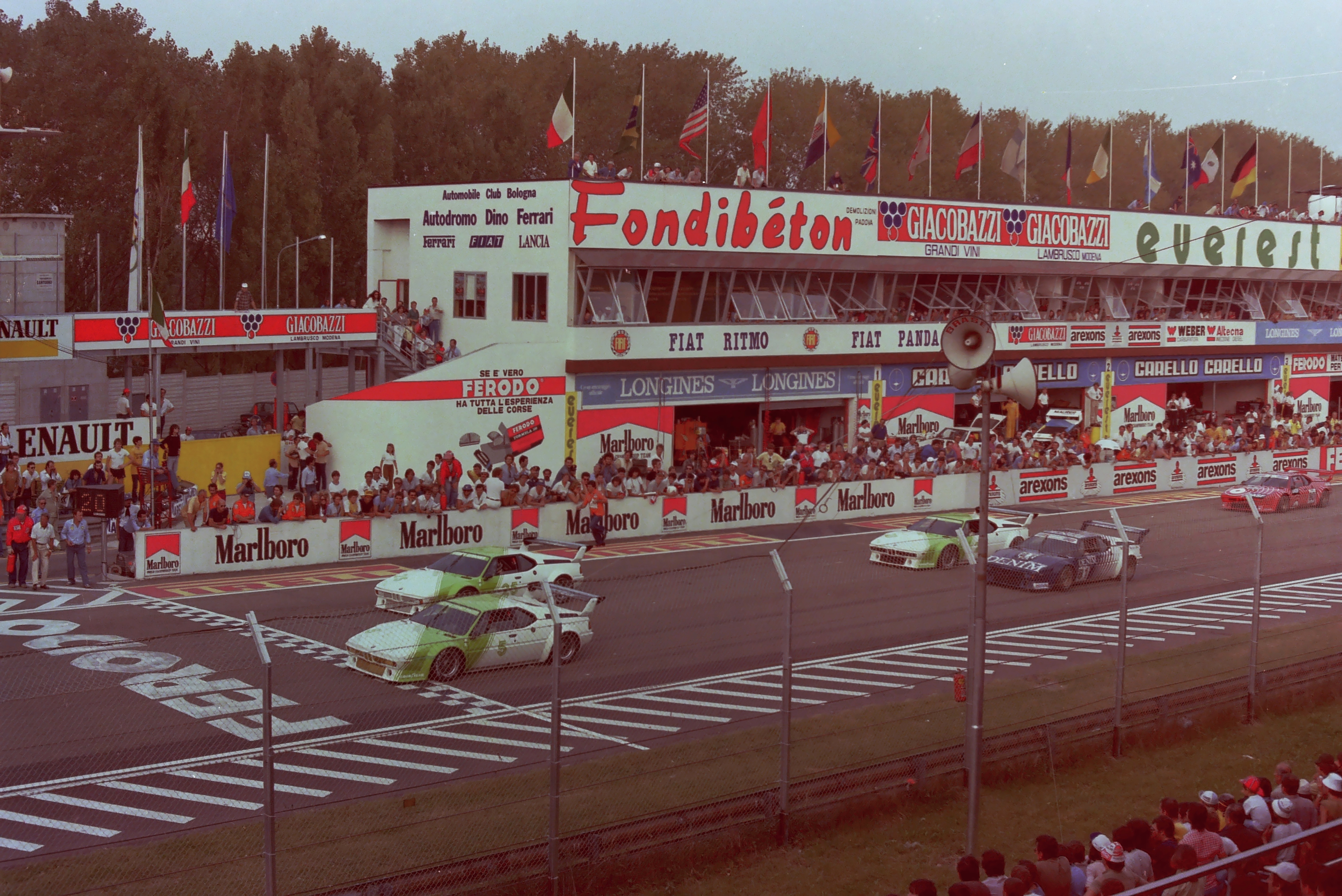
The final starting grid of BMW M1 Procar Championship at Imola on Saturday, Sep. 13, 1980. Nelson Piquet and Didier Pironi led the field

== Teams and drivers ==
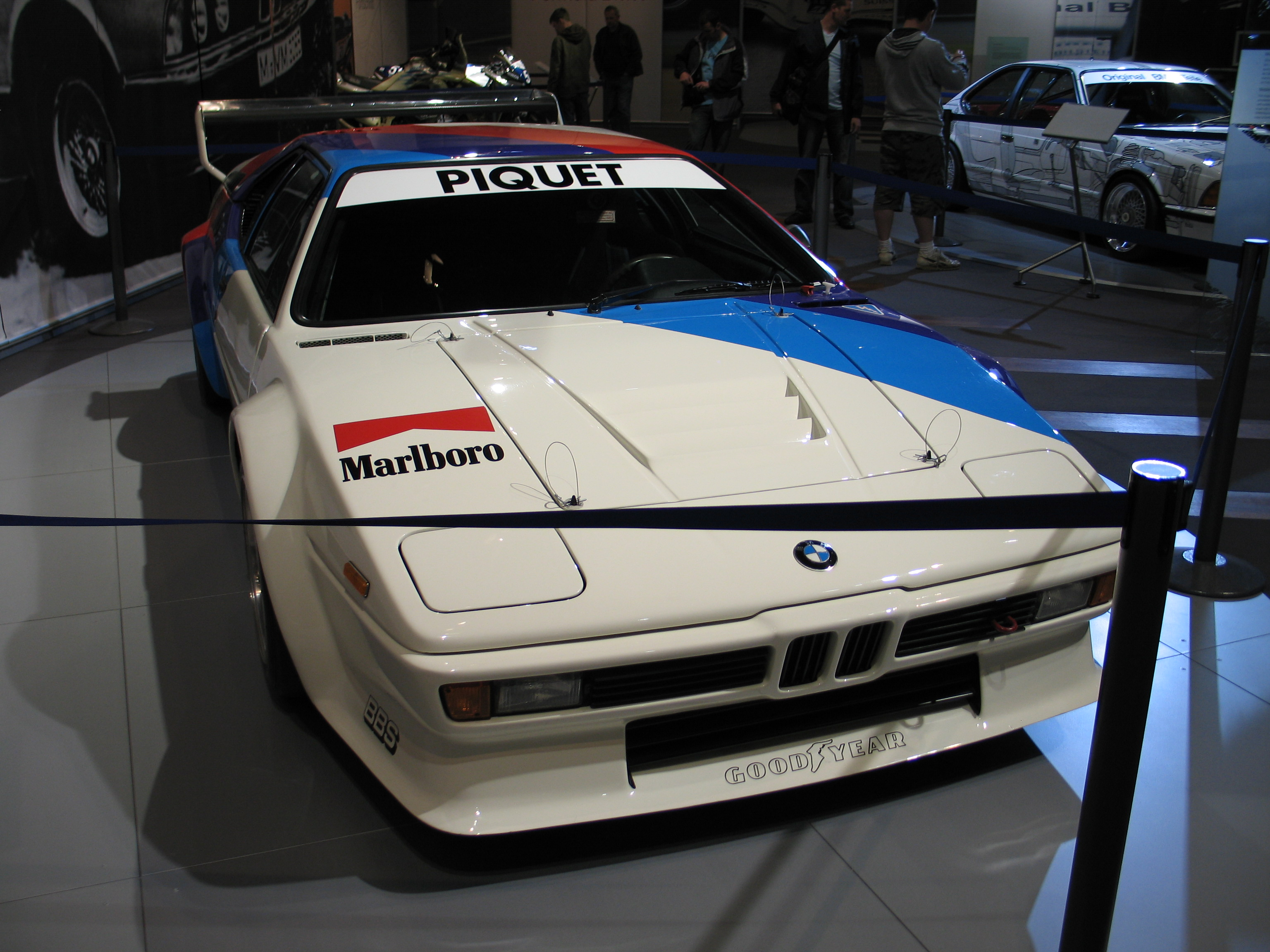
Nelson Piquet's championship-winning BMW Motorsport Procar on display at the Nürburgring Museum.

Team	Driver	Rounds
(West Germany) BMW Motorsport	(United States) Mario Andretti	9
(West Germany) BMW Motorsport	(Republic of Ireland) Derek Daly	3
(West Germany) BMW Motorsport	(France) Jean-Pierre Jarier	6
(West Germany) BMW Motorsport	(Australia) Alan Jones	All
(West Germany) BMW Motorsport	(France) Jacques Laffite	2, 4–8
(West Germany) BMW Motorsport	(Italy) Riccardo Patrese	9
(West Germany) BMW Motorsport	(Brazil) Nelson Piquet	2–4, 6–9
(West Germany) BMW Motorsport	(France) Didier Pironi	1–7, 9
(West Germany) BMW Motorsport	(France) Alain Prost	5
(West Germany) BMW Motorsport	(Argentina) Carlos Reutemann	1–5, 7–9
(Netherlands) BMW Nederland	(Netherlands) Jan Lammers	All
(Switzerland) Eggenberger Motorsport	(West Germany) Helmut Kelleners	3
(Switzerland) Eggenberger Motorsport	(West Germany) Siegfried Müller, Jr.	5, 7–8
(Austria) GS Team	(Netherlands) Michael Bleekemolen	8
(Austria) GS Team	(West Germany) Bernd Brutschin	4
(Austria) GS Team	(West Germany) Hans-Georg Bürger	1–5
(Austria) GS Team	(Venezuela) Johnny Cecotto	9
(Austria) GS Team	(United States) Eddie Cheever	7
(Austria) GS Team	(Austria) Jo Gartner	1–4, 6–8
(Austria) GS Team	(West Germany) Hans Heyer	1–6, 8–9
(Austria) GS Team	(West Germany) Hans-Joachim Stuck	6–9
(Austria) GS Team	(United Kingdom) John Watson	5
(West Germany) Kannacher GT Racing	(West Germany) Jurgen Lässig	6
(West Germany) Manfred Cassani	(West Germany) Christian Danner	6–7
(West Germany) Manfred Cassani	(Liechtenstein) Manfred Schurti	1–2, 4
(West Germany) Manfred Cassani	(West Germany) Manfred Winkelhock	3
(West Germany) Memphis Team International	(Austria) Sepp Manhalter	1, 6
(United Kingdom) Project Four Racing	(West Germany) Hans-Joachim Stuck	1-5
(West Germany) Peter Oberndorfer	(West Germany) Peter Oberndorfer	6
(West Germany) Racing Team Jurgensen	(West Germany) Hans-Christian Jurgensen	4
(West Germany) Ralf-Dieter Schreiber	(West Germany) Ralf-Dieter Schreiber	2
(Switzerland) Sauber Motorsport	(Switzerland) Walter Nußbaumer	1, 4–5, 8
(Switzerland) Sauber Motorsport	(Liechtenstein) Manfred Schurti	3, 6–7
(Switzerland) Sauber Motorsport	(Switzerland) Marc Surer	4–9
(West Germany) Schnitzer Motorsport	(Switzerland) Walter Brun	2–4, 6–7, 9
(West Germany) Schnitzer Motorsport	(Italy) Beppe Gabbiani	1, 3–4, 9
(West Germany) Schnitzer Motorsport	(Austria) Willy Siller	7
(West Germany) Schutz Racing	(West Germany) Wolfgang Schutz	1, 3–9
Team Austria	(Austria) Dieter Quester	1–7, 9
(Switzerland) Team Lepitre	(Switzerland) Edy Brandenberger	1–2, 4, 6, 8
(Italy) Team Merzario	(Italy) Arturo Merzario	1–6
(Italy) Team Merzario	(Italy) Massimo Sigala	1, 3–6, 9

== Calendar and results ==
No.	Circuit	Dates	Pole position	Winning driver	Winning team	Parent event	Ref.
1	(United Kingdom) Donington Park	April 26	(Netherlands) Jan Lammers	(Netherlands) Jan Lammers	(Netherlands) BMW Nederland	None	
2	(West Germany) AVUS	May 11		(Liechtenstein) Manfred Schurti	(West Germany) Manfred Cassani	Avusrennen	
3	Circuit de Monaco	May 17	(Netherlands) Jan Lammers	(West Germany) Hans-Joachim Stuck	(United Kingdom) Project Four Racing	Monaco Grand Prix	
4	(West Germany) Norisring	June 22	(Switzerland) Marc Surer	(West Germany) Hans-Joachim Stuck	(United Kingdom) Project Four Racing	Norisring Trophy	
5	(United Kingdom) Brands Hatch	July 12	(Switzerland) Marc Surer	(Argentina) Carlos Reutemann	(West Germany) BMW Motorsport	British Grand Prix	
6	(West Germany) Hockenheimring	August 9	(Liechtenstein) Manfred Schurti	(France) Didier Pironi	(West Germany) BMW Motorsport	German Grand Prix	
7	(Austria) Österreichring	August 16	(France) Jacques Laffite	(Brazil) Nelson Piquet	(West Germany) BMW Motorsport	Austrian Grand Prix	
8	(Netherlands) Circuit Zandvoort	August 31	(West Germany) Hans Heyer	(Brazil) Nelson Piquet	(West Germany) BMW Motorsport	Dutch Grand Prix	
9	(Italy) Autodromo Enzo e Dino Ferrari	September 13	(Brazil) Nelson Piquet	(Brazil) Nelson Piquet	(West Germany) BMW Motorsport	Italian Grand Prix	

== Championship standings ==
Points system

Race Position	1st	2nd	3rd	4th	5th	6th	7th	8th	9th	10th
Points	20	15	12	10	8	6	4	3	2	1

Standings

Pos.	Driver	DON (United Kingdom)	AVS (West Germany)	MCO (Monaco)	NOR (West Germany)	BRH (United Kingdom)	HOC (West Germany)	ÖST (Austria)	ZAN (Netherlands)	IMO (Italy)	Points
1	(Brazil) Nelson Piquet	5	Ret	3	Ret		4	1	1	1	90
2	(Australia) Alan Jones	3	7	4	5	2	Ret	8	4	2	77
3	(West Germany) Hans-Joachim Stuck	16	12	1	1	7	3	2	Ret	Ret	71
4	(Netherlands) Jan Lammers	1	2	Ret	2	10	5	7	6	Ret	69
5	(Argentina) Carlos Reutemann	6	5	6	Ret	1		3	5	7	64
6	(Liechtenstein) Manfred Schurti	DNS	1	8	4		2	Ret			48
7	(West Germany) Hans Heyer	2	Ret	11	9	5	7		Ret	3	41
8	(Switzerland) Marc Surer				3	Ret	13	4	2	Ret	37
=	(France) Jacques Laffite		4		7	4	10	Ret	3		37
10	(France) Didier Pironi	15	Ret	9	Ret	3	1	DNS		Ret	34
11	(Switzerland) Walter Brun		6	10	11		8	Ret		5	18
12	(West Germany) Wolfgang Schütz	10		Ret	Ret	Ret	9	9	9	4	17
13	(Austria) Jo Gartner	4	Ret	Ret	DNS		Ret	Ret	Ret	6	16
14	(West Germany) Helmut Kelleners			2							15
=	(West Germany) Hans-Georg Bürger	Ret	3	Ret	8	Ret					15
=	(Austria) Dieter Quester	Ret	10	Ret	6	11	Ret	5		DNS	15
17	(West Germany) Christian Danner						6	6			12
18	(Italy) Beppe Gabbiani	9		5	Ret					Ret	10
19	(Italy) Arturo Merzario	7	8	Ret	10	13	15				8
=	(Italy) Massimo Sigala	8		7	Ret	12	12			10	8
21	(France) Alain Prost					6					6
=	(Switzerland) Edy Brandenberger	11	9		DNS		11		7		6
23	(United Kingdom) John Watson					8					3
=	(Netherlands) Michael Bleekemolen								8		3
=	(Venezuela) Johnny Cecotto									8	3
=	(West Germany) Siegfried Müller, Jr.					9		10	Ret		3
27	(Italy) Riccardo Patrese									9	2
28	(Switzerland) Walter Nußbaumer	13			Ret	Ret			10		1
NC	(West Germany) Ralf-Dieter Schreiber		11								0
=	(Austria) Sepp Manhalter	14					17				0
=	(West Germany) Jürgen Lässig						14				0
=	(West Germany) Peter Oberndorfer						16				0
=	(Republic of Ireland) Derek Daly			Ret							0
=	(West Germany) Manfred Winkelhock			Ret							0
=	(West Germany) Hans-Christian Jurgensen				Ret						0
=	(West Germany) Bernd Brutschin				Ret						0
=	(France) Jean-Pierre Jarier						Ret				0
=	(Austria) Willy Siller							Ret			0
=	(United States) Eddie Cheever							Ret			0
=	(United States) Mario Andretti								Ret		0
Pos.	Driver	DON (United Kingdom)	AVS (West Germany)	MCO (Monaco)	NOR (West Germany)	BRH (United Kingdom)	HOC (West Germany)	ÖST (Austria)	ZAN (Netherlands)	IMO (Italy)	Points
