= 1980 British Formula Three season =

1980 British Formula 3 International Series

Seasons
- ← 1979 1981 →

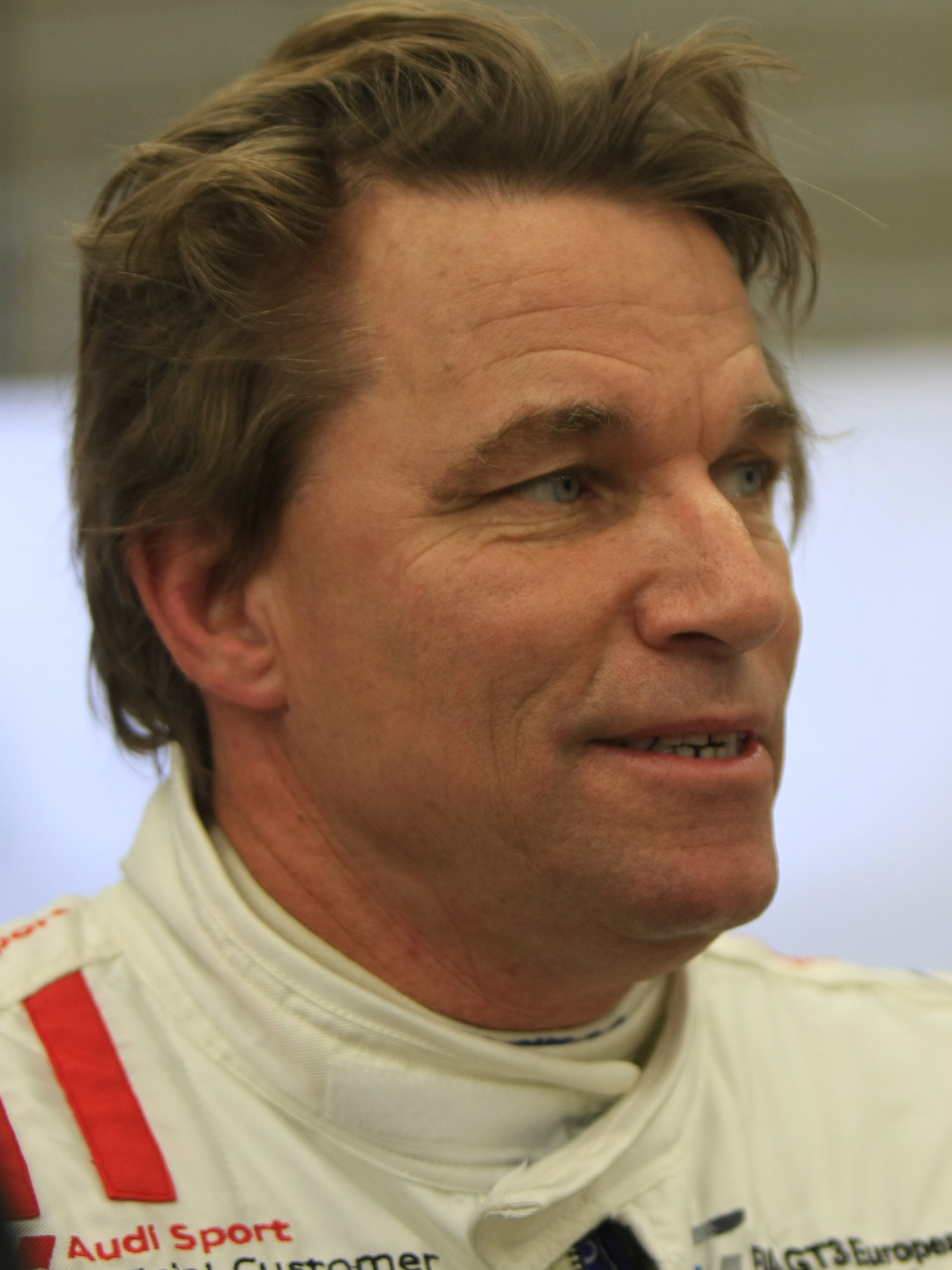
1980 champion, Stefan Johansson

The 1980 British Formula Three season (known as the 1980 Vandervell British Formula 3 Championship for sponsorship reasons) was the 30th season of the British Formula Three Championship. Swedish driver Stefan Johansson won the championship racing for Project Four Racing.

Johansson took the title by two points from title rivals Kenneth Acheson and Roberto Guerrero. At the start of the season, most of the front-runners used the March 803. However, by Round 7 in Snetterton, Acheson had changed to the March 793 and became the man to beat along with Guerrero. In the latter half of the season, Johansson changed from the 803 to the Ralt RT3, winning the last four races. It was also the last Britifh Formula 3 season for Nigel Mansell as he moved into Formula One to drive for Lotus.

== Race Calendar and Results ==
=== Chamipionship Events ===
Round	Circuit	Date	Pole position	Winning driver	Winning team
1	(United Kingdom) Silverstone	2 March	(Sweden) Stefan Johansson	(Sweden) Stefan Johansson	Project Four Racing
2	(United Kingdom) Thruxton	9 March	(Sweden) Stefan Johansson	(Colombia) Roberto Guerrero	Anglia Cars
3	(United Kingdom) Brands Hatch	30 March	(Sweden) Stefan Johansson	(New Zealand) Brett Riley	David Price Racing
4	(United Kingdom) Thruxton	7 April	(Sweden) Stefan Johansson	(United Kingdom) Kenneth Acheson	RMC Group
5	(United Kingdom) Silverstone	20 April	(United Kingdom) Kenneth Acheson	(United Kingdom) Kenneth Acheson	RMC Group
6	(United Kingdom) Thruxton	6 May	(Colombia) Roberto Guerrero	(Colombia) Roberto Guerrero	Anglia Cars
7	(United Kingdom) Snetterton	11 May	(United Kingdom) Kenneth Acheson	(United Kingdom) Kenneth Acheson	RMC Group
8	(United Kingdom) Silverstone	26 May	(Sweden) Stefan Johansson	(Sweden) Stefan Johansson	Project Four Racing
9	(United Kingdom) Cadwell Park	1 June	(Colombia) Roberto Guerrero	(Colombia) Roberto Guerrero	Anglia Cars
10	(United Kingdom) Silverstone	8 June	(United Kingdom) Kenneth Acheson	(United Kingdom) Kenneth Acheson	RMC Group
11	(United Kingdom) Brands Hatch	29 June	(Colombia) Roberto Guerrero	(Colombia) Roberto Guerrero	Anglia Cars
12	(United Kingdom) Silverstone	6 July	(Sweden) Stefan Johansson	(Belgium) Thierry Tassin	Anglia Cars
13	(United Kingdom) Brands Hatch	13 July	(New Zealand) Brett Riley	(United Kingdom) Kenneth Acheson	RMC Group
14	(United Kingdom) Oulton Park	19 July	(Colombia) Roberto Guerrero	(Colombia) Roberto Guerrero	Anglia Cars
15	(United Kingdom) Silverstone	25 August	(United Kingdom) Kenneth Acheson	(Belgium) Thierry Tassin	Anglia Cars
16	(United Kingdom) Silverstone	7 September	(South Africa) Mike White	(South Africa) Mike White	Autowindscreens with Gerard Racing
17	(United Kingdom) Mallory Park	28 September	(Sweden) Stefan Johansson	(Sweden) Stefan Johansson	Project Four Racing
18	(United Kingdom) Silverstone	5 October	(Sweden) Stefan Johansson	(Sweden) Stefan Johansson	Project Four Racing
19	(United Kingdom) Oulton Park	18 October	(Sweden) Stefan Johansson	(Sweden) Stefan Johansson	Project Four Racing
20	(United Kingdom) Thruxton	26 October	(Sweden) Stefan Johansson	(Sweden) Stefan Johansson	Project Four Racing

=== Non Chamipionship Events ===
Name	Circuit	Date	Pole position	Winning driver	Winning team
Howitt Printing Trophy	(United Kingdom) Silverstone	27 April	(United Kingdom) Kenneth Acheson	(United Kingdom) Kenneth Acheson	RMC Group
Leinster Trophy	(Republic of Ireland) Mondello Park	14 September	(Republic of Ireland) Bernard Devaney	(United Kingdom) Trevor Templeton	A. W. Brown
Wendy Wools Formula 3 Race	(United Kingdom) Thruxton	8 November	(Sweden) Stefan Johansson	(New Zealand) Rob Wilson	SW Racing

== Championship Standings ==
Place	Driver	Entrant	Total
1	(Sweden) Stefan Johansson	Project Four Racing	97
2	(United Kingdom) Kenneth Acheson	RMC Group	95
2	(Colombia) Roberto Guerrero	Anglia Cars	95
4	(Belgium) Thierry Tassin	Anglia Cars	59
5	(New Zealand) Rob Wilson	SW Racing	40
6	(South Africa) Mike White	Autowindscreens with Gerard Racing	37
7	(New Zealand) Brett Riley	David Price Racing	20
8	(United Kingdom) David Sears	Rushen Green Racing	19
9	(United Kingdom) Nigel Mansell	March Racing Ltd	15
9	(Republic of Ireland) Eddie Jordan	Marlboro Team Ireland	15
