= 1981 British Formula Three Championship =

Motor racing series in the UK

1981 British Formula 3 International Series

Seasons
- ← 1980 1982 →

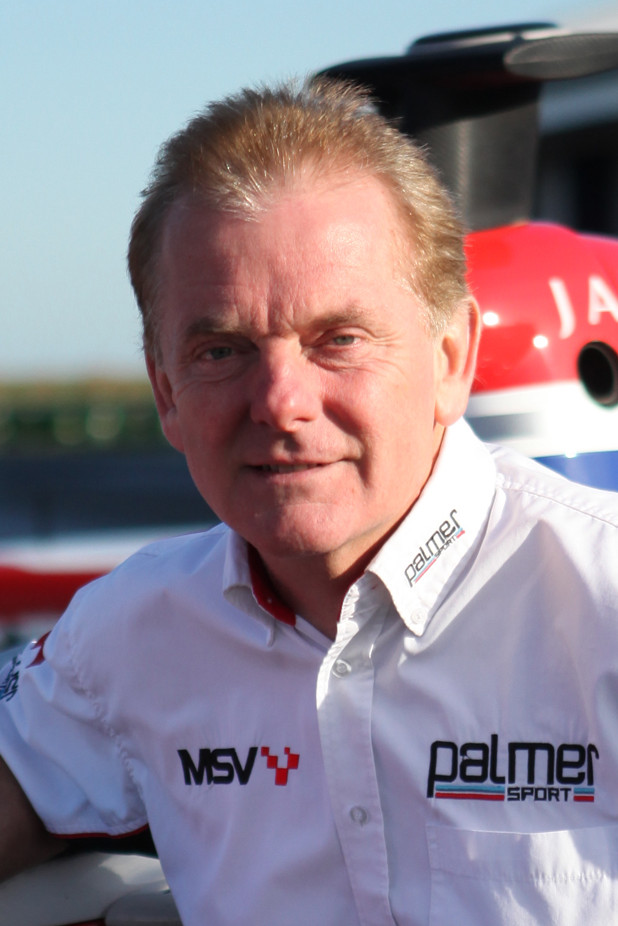
1981 champion, Jonathan Palmer

The 1981 British Formula Three Championship (known as the 1981 Marlboro British F3 Championship for sponsorship reasons) was the 31st season of the British Formula Three Championship. The title was won by Jonathan Palmer driving for West Surrey Racing in the Ralt RT3 (Toyota). He finished the season with 126 points and 7 wins ahead of Belgian Thierry Tassin with 91 points (5 wins), and Brazilian Raul Boesel with 80 points (3 wins).

== Race calendar and results ==
Round	Circuit	Date	Pole position	Winning driver	Winning team
1	(United Kingdom) Silverstone	1 March	(United Kingdom) Jonathan Palmer	(United Kingdom) Jonathan Palmer	West Surrey Racing
2	(United Kingdom) Thruxton	8 March	(United Kingdom) David Sears	(United Kingdom) Jonathan Palmer	West Surrey Racing
3	(United Kingdom) Silverstone	29 March	(South Africa) Mike White	(United Kingdom) Jonathan Palmer	West Surrey Racing
4	(United Kingdom) Mallory Park	12 April	(South Africa) Mike White	(United Kingdom) Jonathan Palmer	West Surrey Racing
5	(United Kingdom) Thruxton	20 April	(United Kingdom) David Leslie	(Belgium) Thierry Tassin	Neil Trundle Racing
6	(United Kingdom) Thruxton	4 May	(Brazil) Raul Boesel	(South Africa) Mike White	Autowindscreens/March Engineering
7	(United Kingdom) Snetterton	10 May	(United Kingdom) James Weaver	(United Kingdom) James Weaver	Eurosports Management/Team Tiga
8	(United Kingdom) Silverstone	25 May	(Brazil) Raul Boesel	(Belgium) Thierry Tassin	Neil Trundle Racing
9	(United Kingdom) Cadwell Park	14 June	(United Kingdom) Jonathan Palmer	(United Kingdom) Jonathan Palmer	West Surrey Racing
10	(United Kingdom) Silverstone	21 June	(Brazil) Roberto Moreno	(Italy) Mauro Baldi	Euroracing
11	(United Kingdom) Silverstone	5 July	(United Kingdom) Jonathan Palmer	(Brazil) Raul Boesel	Murray Taylor Racing
12	(United Kingdom) Brands Hatch	12 July	(United Kingdom) Dave Scott	(Belgium) Thierry Tassin	Neil Trundle Racing
13	(United Kingdom) Silverstone	18 July	(Belgium) Thierry Tassin	(Belgium) Thierry Tassin	Neil Trundle Racing
14	(United Kingdom) Mallory Park	2 August	(Brazil) Raul Boesel	(Brazil) Roberto Moreno	Barron Racing
15	(United Kingdom) Oulton Park	15 August	(United Kingdom) Jonathan Palmer	(Brazil) Raul Boesel	Café do Brasil
16	(United Kingdom) Silverstone	31 August	(United Kingdom) Dave Scott	(United Kingdom) Dave Scott	Swift Caravans/Mint Engineering
17	(United Kingdom) Oulton Park	27 September	(Belgium) Thierry Tassin	(United Kingdom) Jonathan Palmer	West Surrey Racing
18	(United Kingdom) Silverstone	4 October	(United Kingdom) Jonathan Palmer	(Brazil) Raul Boesel	Café do Brasil
19	(United Kingdom) Snetterton	11 October	(United Kingdom) Jonathan Palmer	(United Kingdom) Jonathan Palmer	West Surrey Racing
20	(United Kingdom) Thruxton	25 October	(United Kingdom) Dave Scott	(Belgium) Thierry Tassin	Neil Trundle Racing

== Championship Standings ==
The scoring system was 9-6-4-3-2-1 points awarded to the first six finishers, with 1 (one) extra point given to the driver who set the fastest lap of the race.

Pos.	Driver	Team	Pts
1	(United Kingdom) Jonathan Palmer	West Surrey Racing	122
2	(Belgium) Thierry Tassin	Neil Trundle Racing	92
3	(Brazil) Raul Boesel	Murray Taylor Racing	80
4	(South Africa) Mike White	March Engineering	38
5	(United Kingdom) David Leslie	Eddie Jordan Racing	29
6	(United Kingdom) Dave Scott	Mint Engineering	28
7	(United Kingdom) James Weaver	Team Tiga	21
8	(United States) Cliff Hansen	Team Tiga	13
9	(Denmark) Kurt Thiim	Gerard Racing	12
10	(Netherlands) Michael Bleekemolen	Barron Racing	11
11	(Brazil) Roberto Moreno	Barron Racing	9
11	(Netherlands) Fred Krab	David Price Racing	9
13	(United Kingdom) David Sears	Eddie Jordan Racing	7
13	(United Kingdom) Richard Trott	Richard Trott Racing	7
13	(Sweden) Bengt Trägårdh	David Price Racing	7
16	(Japan) Shuroku Sasaki	Shuroko Sasaki	5
17	(Japan) Toshio Suzuki	March Engineering	3
17	(United Kingdom) Mike Blanchet	Roy Kennedy Racing	3
19	(Argentina) Victor Rosso	Argentina Racing	2
20	(United Kingdom) David Coyne	Rushbrooke Racing	1
