= 1979 British Formula Three Championship =

1979 British Formula Three season

Seasons
- ← 1978 1980 →

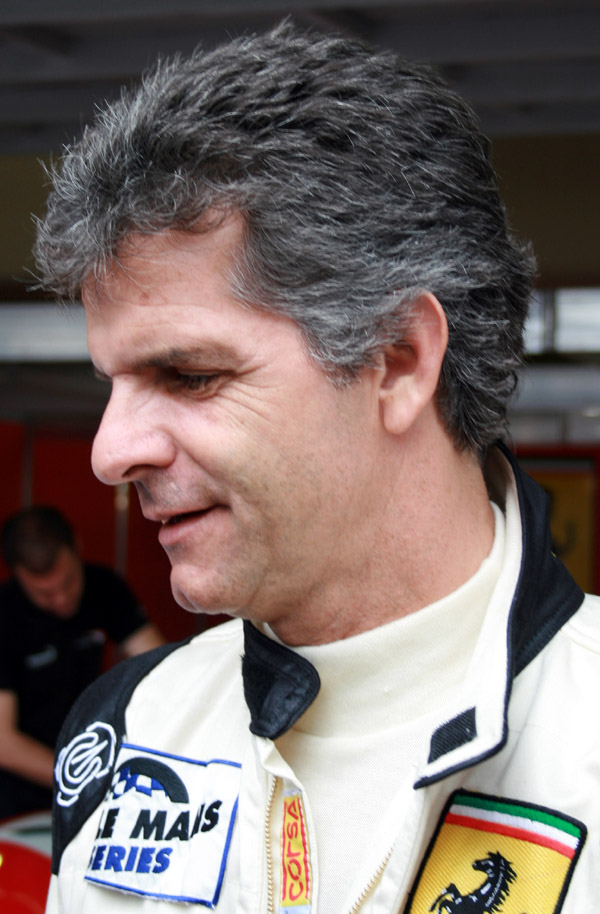
1979 champion, Chico Serra

The 1979 British Formula Three season was the 29th season of the British Formula Three Championship.

Only Project Four Racing and Team Tiga appeared properly prepared for the 1979 season, with respective drivers Chico Serra and Andrea de Cesaris. It would be Serra’s consistency that saw him take the BARC/BRDC Vandervell British Formula 3 Championship after a number of avoidable accidents and mistakes from de Cesaris, dropped him from contention. The Kiwi teenage sensation, Mike Thackwell was also very consistent, winning four of the last eight races for the works March Racing team.

The scoring system was 9-6-4-3-2-1 for the drivers placed in the first six positions, with 1 (one) extra point added for the driver who registered the fastest lap time of the race.

== B.A.R.C./B.R.D.C. Vandervell British F3 Championship ==
Champion: (Brazil) Chico Serra

Runner Up: (Italy) Andrea de Cesaris

=== Results ===
Date	Round	Circuit	Winning driver	Winning team	Winning car
04/03/79	Rd.1	(United Kingdom) Silverstone (club)	(Brazil) Chico Serra	Sadia Racing with Project Four	March 793-Toyota
11/03/79	Rd.2	(United Kingdom) Thruxton	(Italy) Andrea de Cesaris	Marlboro Team Tiga	March 793-Toyota
25/03/79	Rd.3	(United Kingdom) Silverstone	(United Kingdom) Nigel Mansell	Unipart Team	March 783/793-Triumph
01/04/79	Rd.4	(United Kingdom) Snetterton	(Brazil) Chico Serra	Sadia Racing with Project Four	March 793-Toyota
08/04/79	Rd.5	(United Kingdom) Donington Park	(Brazil) Chico Serra	Sadia Racing with Project Four	March 793-Toyota
16/04/79	Rd.5	(United Kingdom) Thruxton	(Italy) Andrea de Cesaris	Marlboro Team Tiga	March 793-Toyota
07/05/79	Rd.7	(United Kingdom) Brands Hatch (Indy)	(Italy) Andrea de Cesaris	Marlboro Team Tiga	March 793-Toyota
20/05/79	Rd.8	(United Kingdom) Donington Park	(New Zealand) Brett Riley	Unipart Team	March 793-Triumph
28/05/79	Rd.9	(United Kingdom) Silverstone (club)	(Republic of Ireland) Bernard Devaney	Derek McMahon Racing with Chevron Cars	Chevron B47B-Toyota
10/06/79	Rd.10	(United Kingdom) Brands Hatch (Indy)	(New Zealand) Mike Thackwell	March Racing Ltd	March 793-Toyota
17/06/79	Rd.11	(United Kingdom) Cadwell Park	(Italy) Andrea de Cesaris	Marlboro Team Tiga	March 793-Toyota
01/07/79	Rd.12	(United Kingdom) Silverstone (Club)	(Italy) Andrea de Cesaris	Marlboro Team Tiga	March 793-Toyota
13/07/79	Rd.13	(United Kingdom) Silverstone	(New Zealand) Mike Thackwell	March Racing Ltd	March 793-Toyota
05/08/79	Rd.14	(United Kingdom) Snetterton	(New Zealand) Mike Thackwell	March Racing Ltd	March 793-Toyota
12/08/79	Rd.15	(United Kingdom) Mallory Park	(Brazil) Chico Serra	Sadia Racing with Project Four	March 793-Toyota
27/08/79	Rd.16	(United Kingdom) Silverstone (Club)	(Brazil) Chico Serra	Sadia Racing with Project Four	March 793-Toyota
15/09/79	Rd.17	(United Kingdom) Oulton Park	(New Zealand) Mike Thackwell	March Racing Ltd	March 793-Toyota
30/09/79	Rd.18	(United Kingdom) Thruxton	(Italy) Andrea de Cesaris	Marlboro Team Tiga	March 793-Toyota
07/10/79	Rd.19	(United Kingdom) Silverstone	(Sweden) Stefan Johansson	Marlboro Racing with Derek McMahon	March 793-Toyota
28/10/79	Rd.20	(United Kingdom) Thruxton	(New Zealand) Mike Thackwell	March Racing Ltd	March 793-Toyota

=== Table ===
Place	Driver	Car — Engine	Total
1	(Brazil) Chico Serra	March 793-Toyota	103
2	(Italy) Andrea de Cesaris	March 793-Toyota	90
3	(New Zealand) Mike Thackwell	March 793-Toyota	71
4	(Sweden) Stefan Johansson	Chevron B47-Toyota; March 793-Toyota	54
5	(New Zealand) Brett Riley	March 783/793-Triumph	40
6	(United Kingdom) Kenny Acheson	Ralt RT1-Toyota; March 793-Toyota	35
7	(Republic of Ireland) Bernard Devaney	Chevron B47-Toyota	27
8	(United Kingdom) Nigel Mansell	March 783/793-Triumph	24
9	(Republic of Ireland) Michael Roe	Chevron B47-Toyota	15
9	(Colombia) Roberto Guerrero	Argo JM3-Toyota	15
11	(Republic of Ireland) Eddie Jordan	Chevron B47-Toyota; March 793-Toyota	9
12	(France) Alain Prost	Martini Mk27-Renault	4
12	(New Zealand) Rob Wilson	March 793-Toyota	4
12	(United Kingdom) John Bright	March 793-Toyota	4
12	(Spain) Jorge Caton	Ralt RT1-Toyota	4
12	(Brazil) Placido Iglesias	Ralt RT1-Toyota	4
17	(Brazil) Fernando Jorge	Ralt RT1-Toyota	3
17	(United Kingdom) Mike Blanchet	Lola T670-Chevrolet; Lola T670-Toyota	3
19	(Belgium) Thierry Boutsen	March-Toyota 793	2
20	(United Kingdom) Ken Eady	March 783/793-Triumph	1
20	(France) Richard Dallest	Martini Mk27-Toyota	1
20	(United Kingdom) Alan Smith	Chevron B47B-Toyota	1
20	(Sweden) Bengt Trägårdh	Ralt RT1-Toyota	1
20	(Sweden) Jon Hedström	Ralt RT1-Toyota	1

== Non-Championship Races ==
=== Results ===
Date	Race	Circuit	Winning driver	Winning team	Winning car
03/06/79	RAC FOCA Trophy	(United Kingdom) Donington Park	(Republic of Ireland) Michael Roe	David Clark Team Riva Watches	Chevron B47-Toyota
15/07/79	Radio Trent Trophy	(United Kingdom) Donington Park	(United Kingdom) Kenny Acheson	The RMC Group	March 793-Toyota
02/09/79	Leinster Trophy	(Republic of Ireland) Mondello Park	(United Kingdom) Trevor Templeton	A.W. Brown Racing with Malcolm Templeton	Ralt RT1-Toyota
09/09/79	John Player International F3 Trophy	(United Kingdom) Donington Park	(United Kingdom) Kenny Acheson	The RMC Group	March 793-Toyota
03/11/79	BARC TV Trophy	(United Kingdom) Thruxton	(United Kingdom) Kenny Acheson	The RMC Group	March 793-Toyota
