= Nelson Piquet =

Brazilian racing driver (born 1952)

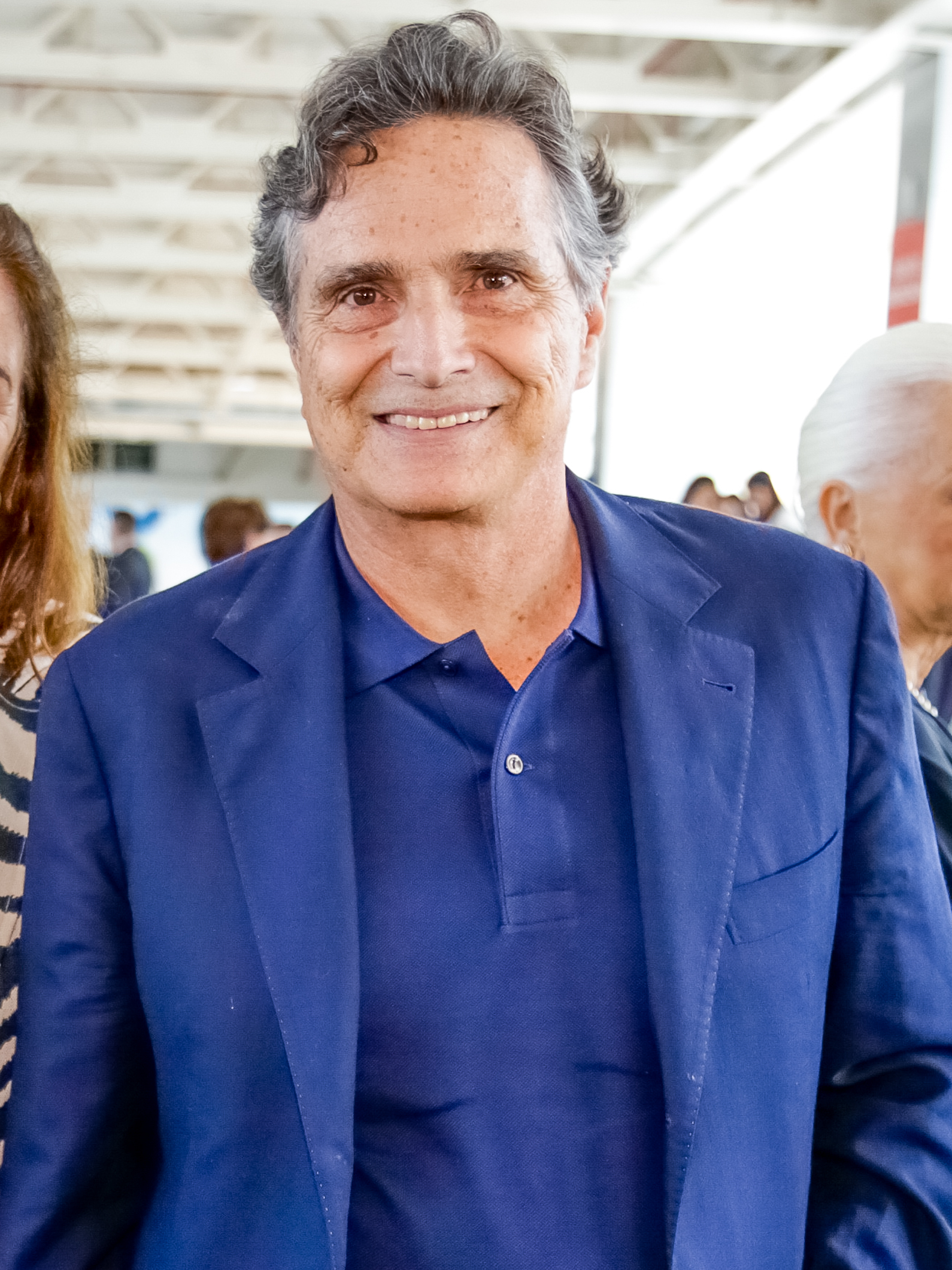
- Piquet in 2022
- Born: Nelson Piquet Souto Maior; 17 August 1952 (age 74); Rio de Janeiro, Brazil
- Spouses: Maria Clara (m. 1977; div. 1978) Sylvia Tamsma (m. 1978; div. 1993) Viviane de Souza Leão (m. 1998)
- Children: 6, including Nelson Jr., Kelly and Pedro

Formula One World Championship career
- Nationality: (Brazil) Brazilian
- Active years: 1978–1991
- Team(s): Ensign, BS Fabrications (privateer), Brabham, Williams, Lotus, Benetton
- Entries: 207 (204 starts)
- Championships: 3 (1981, 1983, 1987)
- Wins: 23
- Podiums: 60
- Career points: 481.5 (485.5) (Note: Up until 1990, not all points scored by a driver contributed to their final World Championship tally (see list of points scoring systems for more information). Numbers without parentheses are Championship points; numbers in parentheses are total points scored.)
- Pole positions: 24
- Fastest laps: 23
- First entry: 1978 German Grand Prix
- First win: 1980 United States Grand Prix West
- Last win: 1991 Canadian Grand Prix
- Last entry: 1991 Australian Grand Prix

24 Hours of Le Mans career
- Years: 1996–1997
- Teams: BMW
- Best finish: 8th (1996)
- Class wins: 0

Nelson Piquet Souto Maior (Brazilian Portuguese pronunciation: [ˈnɛwsõ piˈke], born 17 August 1952) is a Brazilian former racing driver and businessman, who competed in Formula One from 1978 to 1991. Piquet won three Formula One World Drivers' Championship titles, which he won in 1981, 1983, and 1987, and won 23 Grands Prix across 14 seasons.

Piquet had a brief career in tennis before losing interest in the sport and subsequently took up karting and hid his identity to prevent his father discovering his hobby. He became the Brazilian national karting champion in 1971–72 and won the Formula Vee Brazil championship in 1976. With advice from Emerson Fittipaldi, Piquet went to Europe to further success by taking the record number of wins in Formula Three in 1978, beating Jackie Stewart's all-time record.

In the same year, Piquet made his Formula One debut with the Ensign team and drove for McLaren and Brabham. In 1979, he moved to the Brabham team and finished the runner-up in 1980 before winning the championship in 1981. Piquet in 1982 was hampered by severe engine unreliability, but he saw a resurgence for 1983 and his second world championship. For 1984–85, Piquet had once again lost chances to win the championship but managed to score three wins during that period. He moved to the Williams team in 1986 and was a title contender until the final round in Australia. Piquet took his third and final championship in 1987 during a heated battle with teammate Nigel Mansell which left the pair's relationship sour. Piquet subsequently moved to Lotus for 1988–89 where he experienced his third drop in form. He eventually went to the Benetton team for 1990–91 where he managed to win three races before retiring.

After retiring from Formula One, Piquet tried his hand at the Indianapolis 500 for two years. He also had a go at sports car racing at various points during and after his Formula One career. Piquet is currently retired and runs several businesses in Brazil. Piquet has faced several controversies since the 1980s—predominantly for his use of homophobic language—and was banned from the Formula One paddock in 2022. The ban was lifted in 2024.

== Early life and career ==
Piquet was born 17 August 1952, in Rio de Janeiro, then the capital of Brazil, the son of Estácio Gonçalves Souto Maior (1913–1974), a Brazilian physician, and his housewife Clotilde Piquet (1920–2007), of French descent. His father moved his family to the new capital, Brasília, in 1960 and became Minister for Health in João Goulart's government (1961–1964). Piquet had two brothers, Alexis and Geraldo, and a sister Genusa. Piquet was the youngest of the children.

His father wanted Piquet to be a professional tennis player and was given a scholarship at a school in the United States, in Atlanta. Piquet started playing tennis at the age of 11. He won tournaments in Brazil and eventually took a trip to California to test his skill against tougher American players. During his time, he had learned to speak English and greatly matured. His short tennis career saw Piquet to be prized as a good player but not thought sufficiently exciting for the sport, which led him to devote his career to motor racing.

Piquet started kart racing at the age of 14, but because his father did not approve of his racing career, he used his mother's maiden name Piquet (of French origin) misspelt as Piket to hide his identity.

Piquet dropped out of a university two years into an engineering course in 1974. He was subsequently employed in a garage to finance his career, since he had no financial support from his family.

Upon returning to Brazil, Piquet and three friends bought a 20 hp cart and participated in Brazilian go-karting (1971 and 1972 national champion) and in the local Formula Super Vee 1976 championship, in which he easily won that season. On the advice of Emerson Fittipaldi, the first Brazilian Formula One world champion who sold the chassis for the Brazilian Formula Vee champion car with his brother, he arrived in European motor sports hailed as a prodigy. In the 1978 British Formula 3 season he broke Jackie Stewart's record of the most wins in a season.

== Formula One ==
Piquet made his Formula One debut for Ensign in Germany, starting 21st only to retire on lap 31 with a broken engine. After the race, Piquet drove a McLaren of BS Fabrications in the next three races, where he left good impressions. The deal was negotiated when BS Fabrications employees met Piquet when he was driving at Brands Hatch. His best finish was ninth in Italy.

=== Brabham (1978–1985) ===
For the last race in 1978, Piquet moved to the Brabham team; he qualified in 14th and finished 11th. Piquet stayed with Brabham until 1985.

==== 1979 ====
In 1979, Piquet competed in his first full season in Formula One. He once again drove for the Brabham team, alongside double world champion, Niki Lauda. The season was difficult for the team, which was accustomed to success. Piquet retired from eleven of the fifteen races in the season. He started off his season being involved in a first-lap pile up and getting injured at the Argentine Grand Prix in Buenos Aires and crashing into Clay Regazzoni's Williams car at the Brazilian Grand Prix at Interlagos. The first points of his career came at the Dutch Grand Prix, where he finished fourth. He had a huge accident at the Italian Grand Prix; the rear section of his BT48 was completely ripped off at Monza's Curva Grande corner after another incident with Regazzoni; Piquet walked away uninjured. But even though the races saw him crash a few times, or retire with a semi-competitive car that had an unreliable engine, in qualifying Piquet performed well, qualifying in the top five several times – often out-qualifying Lauda. Two weeks after the Italian round, Lauda abruptly quit driving before the start of the Canadian Grand Prix, leaving Piquet as the number one driver for Brabham, and leaving him and new recruit Ricardo Zunino to debut the new BT49, which had a Ford-Cosworth DFV engine; Brabham ditched the Alfa Romeo V12's in protest to Alfa Romeo entering as a full works team. In the final race, the United States Grand Prix at Watkins Glen, Piquet started from the front row and took the fastest lap in the race, clearly showing the new BT49's considerable potential.

==== 1980 ====
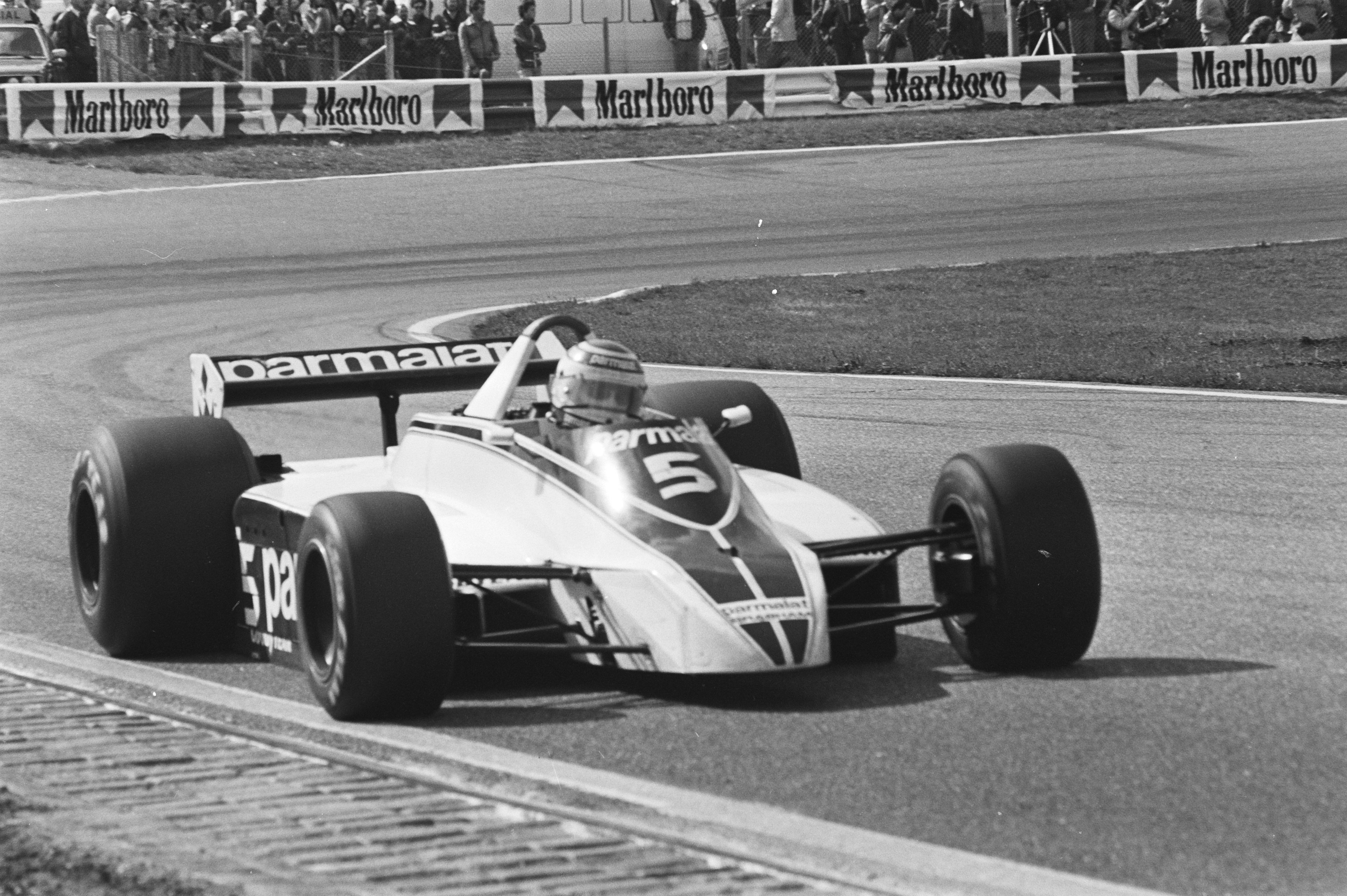
Piquet driving for Brabham at the 1980 Dutch Grand Prix

In 1980, Piquet finished a hard-fought second in Argentina behind Alan Jones; the race was held in very hot conditions on a disintegrating track. There were doubts about the legality of the car as it was believed to be underweight. Jones went to see the car which gave the suspicion that ballast had been added to bring the car within the regulations to make it legal. Piquet took his first win at the United States Grand Prix West in Long Beach, California by over 50 seconds from Riccardo Patrese. 5 months later, Piquet scored back to back wins in the Netherlands and Italy. He finished second in the drivers' standings, 13 points behind title winner Alan Jones. In Canada, Piquet and Jones had contact off the start and Piquet's car was damaged and caused a major crash resulting in the race being red flagged. Jones, his Championship rival, continued in the race and joined the restart in the same car. Piquet switched to his qualifying car which had a special engine that was not set up to go the distance, so Piquet retired and Jones won the race and the World Championship from Piquet.

==== 1981: First World Championship ====
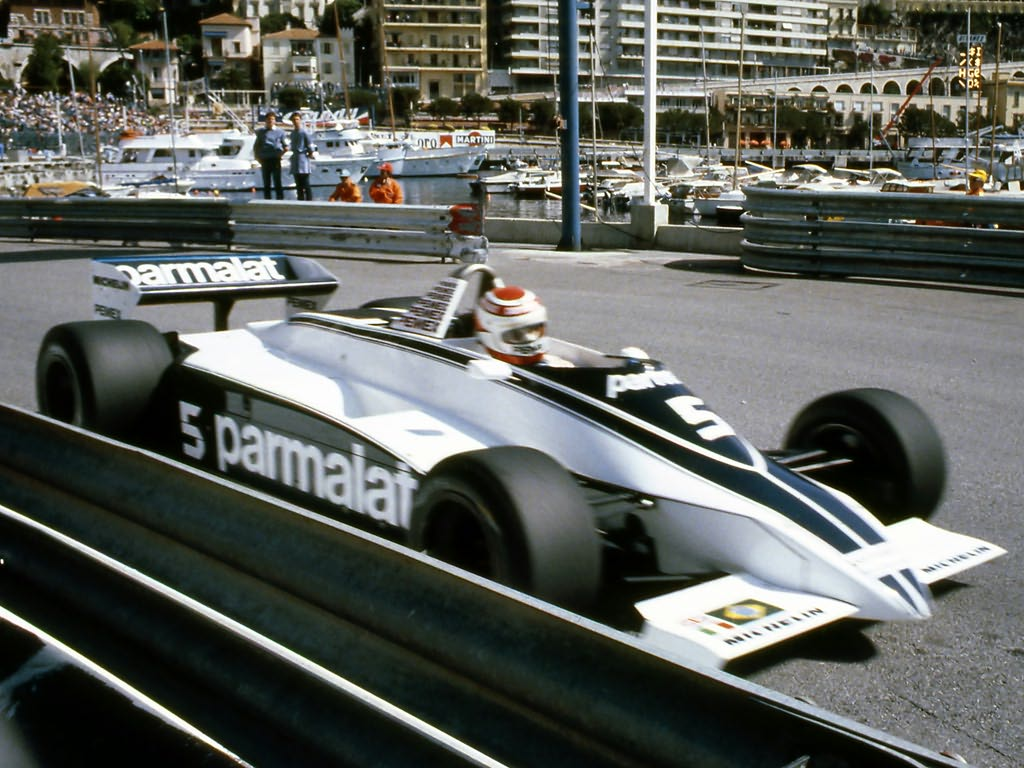
Piquet driving the Cosworth powered Brabham BT49C at the 1981 Monaco Grand Prix.

The season began with the revocation of the South African Grand Prix's status as an FIA-sanctioned event due to the ongoing FISA–FOCA war. With the FISA teams boycotting the race, the FOCA teams staged a non-championship race there in South Africa held in wet conditions which was won by Carlos Reutemann with Piquet second. FISA and FOCA reached an agreement banning movable skirts and requiring a minimum ground clearance, excluding the tyres, of 6 cm.

After a third place in the United States Grand Prix West, Piquet qualified on pole position in his home race, the Brazilian Grand Prix in his birth city of Rio de Janeiro, but quickly faded from contention after starting the race on slick tyres on a soaking wet track. At the next race, the Argentine Grand Prix in Buenos Aires, Brabham got around the ground-clearance rule by devising a suspension system that kept the car at the required height during technical inspection but lowered it onto the ground at speed, allowing it to race once again as a wing car. The superiority of the car was such that Piquet easily swept to victory and even his less experienced Mexican teammate Héctor Rebaque, who could usually be found well down the order, managed to retain second place until he was forced to retire. At the San Marino Grand Prix, almost all the teams adopted the innovation brought to Argentina by Brabham. Piquet won the race despite being caught out by rain.

In the Belgian Grand Prix at Zolder, after an initial start which was aborted due to an accident involving Siegfried Stohr, Piquet's teammate Riccardo Patrese and mechanic Dave Luckett who inexplicably remained on the track at the start to restart Patrese's stalled car, Piquet went off again in the lead only to have Jones make contact on lap 10 forcing him to retire, with the race being won by Reutemann. After crashing in Monaco and Spain, Piquet was able to recover at the French Grand Prix at Dijon where he dominated until lap 58, when a sudden storm led to a red flag and the organizers decided to wait until the rain stopped to continue the race. At the restart 45 minutes later, Alain Prost appeared much more competitive after putting on slicks on a drying track, with some mechanical work performed during the break, and won his first Grand Prix with Piquet relegated to third place, behind Prost and McLaren's John Watson. In the next race, the British Grand Prix, Reutemann finished second to open up a seventeen-point lead in the standings while Piquet suffered tyre failure and crashed on the straight between Stowe and Club corners.

Piquet won the championship with a great comeback that began when he won the German Grand Prix at Hockenheim while Reutemann was enduring internal conflict with his teammate Alan Jones. After stringing together a series of decent results (even after losing second in Italy due to engine failure on the last lap) whilst Reutemann only scored a few times, Piquet went into the last race of the season only a point behind Reutemann. At the Caesars Palace Grand Prix in Las Vegas, Piquet finished fifth to clinch the championship as Reutemann finished out of the points. Piquet was so dehydrated from the desert heat and exhausted from the anti-clockwise nature of the track that he vomited on himself during the race and had to be lifted out of his car when he returned to the pits.

==== 1982 ====
The following year, Piquet was fast but his car proved to be unreliable despite Brabham entering into an alliance with BMW to supply the team with turbocharged engines that although were powerful, were also very unreliable and were the main reason why the car retired from so many races. Aside from the first Grand Prix in South Africa Brabham started the season using the Ford-Cosworth engined BT49D. Piquet won the Brazilian Grand Prix in Rio de Janeiro; the extreme heat and immense adhesion of the cars meant that Piquet and other drivers suffered from exhaustion; Piquet fainted while collecting his trophy on the podium. Piquet was later disqualified for his car being underweight from a protest from Renault and Ferrari. Piquet did not drive the BMW-engined BT50 until Belgium, and the low point of the season was Detroit where he failed to qualify due to an engine failure in qualifying. The ruling of Piquet's disqualification led to a political attack on the lowering of the minimum weight against Ferrari and Renault who used turbo engines. Ferrari's changes to the rear wing at the United States Grand Prix West and the disqualification of Gilles Villeneuve after the race caused the FOCA teams to boycott the San Marino Grand Prix.

His only win was in the Canadian Grand Prix which was also BMW's first win in Formula One. In Germany, Piquet arrived to help Didier Pironi after he suffered a career-ending high-speed crash during practice. In the race, Piquet was leading until he collided with Eliseo Salazar whom he physically attacked at the side of the track on live television.

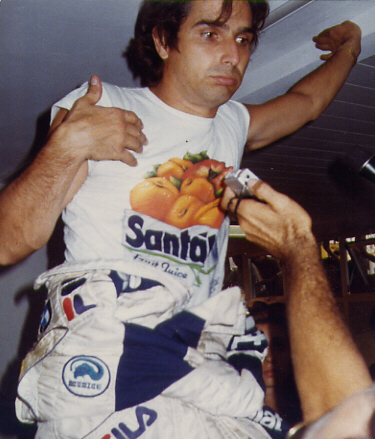
Piquet at Monza in 1983

==== 1983: Second World Championship ====
Piquet won the opening race in Brazil in the arrow-shaped BT52 and followed this up with a retirement in the United States West Grand Prix. He scored a second place in France and took another second at Monaco also taking the fastest lap. He was 14 points behind Alain Prost with three races left in the season but took back-to-back victories at Monza and Brands Hatch to close to within two points. At the season-ending South African Grand Prix, Prost retired on lap 35 and Piquet cruised to a third-place finish, winning his second world title. It also was the first time a turbocharged car won the championship, and was BMW's first and only championship in Formula 1.

==== 1984 ====
With the new rule that limited the capacity of the tanks of the cars to 220 liters and forbade race refueling, Piquet started as the title favorite because it was thought that the 4-cylinder BMW would suffer less from the new fuel economy requirement than the 6-cylinder competition. The winter tests seemed to confirm the expectations, and in fact the car showed promise, but the expected results never materialised. The only good thing that came from the tests was the creation of special qualifying engines, which produced more than 900 hp and allowed Piquet to match what was then the record for pole positions in a year: nine, already held by Lauda and Ronnie Peterson.

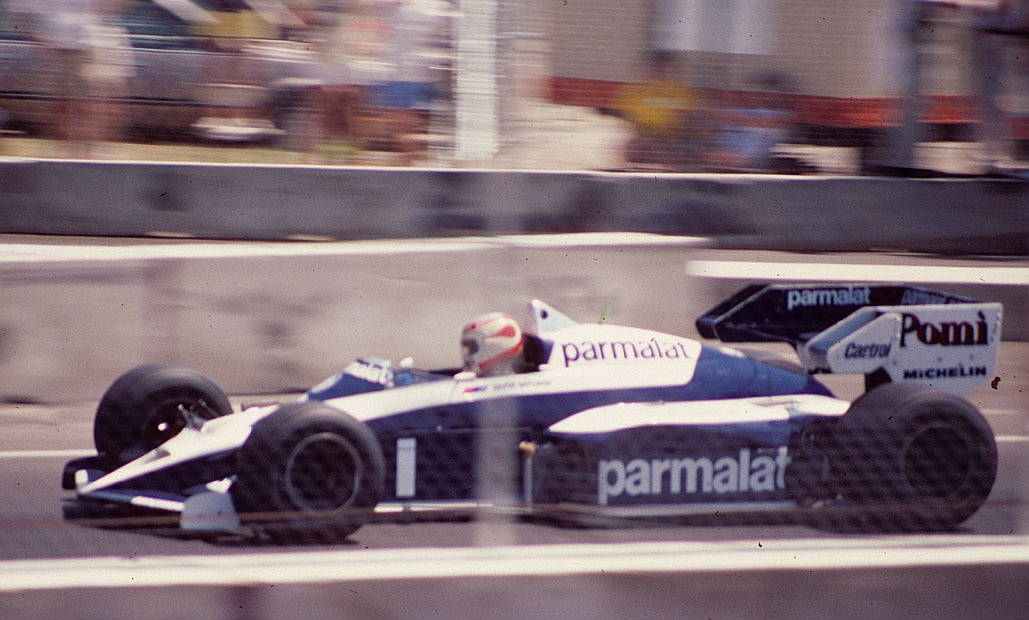
Piquet driving a Brabham BT53 in the 1984 Dallas Grand Prix.

The season was dominated by the McLaren team who were using TAG-Porsche engines. In Canada, the Brabham team introduced a curious additional radiator on the nose that was mounted on the car that improved reliability. Piquet won the race (after having retired from the previous six races, mostly through engine or turbo failure), but the additional radiator heated to the point that Piquet suffered burns on his right foot when pushing the accelerator pedal down; The heat had actually burnt a hole through his boots and he went to the podium barefoot after receiving first aid. He managed take a back-to-back win at Detroit after driving his backup car due to an accident that occurred at the start of the race. These were his only two victories of the year. In Spielberg he could have won as the car of leading Niki Lauda suffered a loss of gears, but Piquet was unaware and did not attack. Piquet finished in fifth place in the championship.

==== 1985 ====
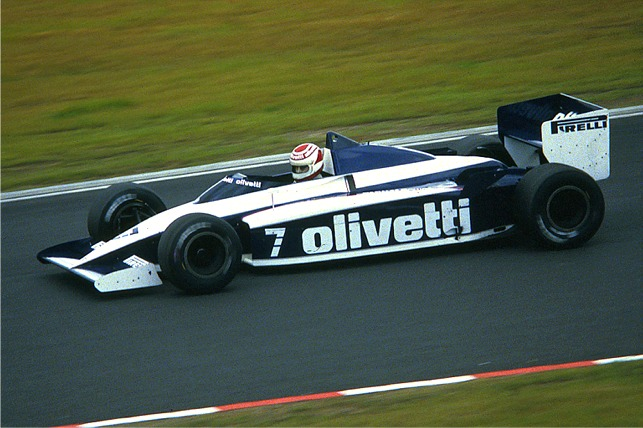
Piquet driving the BMW powered Brabham BT54 at the 1985 German Grand Prix in his last year with the team.

Prior to the 1985 season, Piquet and Brabham conducted their winter testing at the Kyalami circuit in South Africa, along with the team's new tyre supplier Pirelli. It was through this testing that Pirelli came up with the tyre compounds they would use during the season. Unfortunately, unlike the hot conditions in South Africa, most of the European part of the season took place in unseasonably cold weather. This, and the Brabham BT54's weight distribution towards the back of the car saw the Pirelli tyres (especially the fronts) largely ineffective and left Piquet often fast, but ultimately uncompetitive.

In 1985, Piquet won a single race, the French Grand Prix at the Paul Ricard Circuit with summer conditions similar to those experienced in testing suiting the tyres, and the powerful BMW turbo engine propelling the Brabham BT54 (of teammate Marc Surer) to the then F1 speed record of 338 km/h (210 mph) on the 1.8 km (1.1 mi) long Mistral Straight during qualifying. It was Pirelli's first victory since returning to Formula One.

However, Piquet was becoming frustrated. He felt as if his loyalty to Brabham was being taken advantage of – his salary was lower than other drivers despite his success with the team – and he was not being informed of some team decisions. The switch to Pirelli tyres had been particularly upsetting: he felt it had been done purely for financial reasons and placed inordinate commitments on him for tyre testing. He was also concerned about financial security when he retired, citing the difficulties faced by Brazilian footballers Pelé and Garrincha after their professional careers ended. However, he was well integrated with the team and enjoyed close relationships with Gordon Murray and his mechanics, making him reluctant to leave.

Piquet had been in contact with McLaren, but was discouraged by the PR duties that came with it: "(Ron Dennis) mentioned so many days a year working for Marlboro... I lost interest. I won't waste my life talking to people who don't understand racing." Williams offered him a contract worth three times his Brabham contract, and with the turbocharged Honda engine quickly becoming one of the best on the grid, it was an offer too good to refuse. After some thought, he reluctantly left Brabham after seven seasons and two world championships with Honda agreeing to buy Piquet out of his Brabham contract.

=== Williams (1986–1987) ===
==== 1986 ====
A move in 1986 to Williams saw Piquet becoming the teammate of one of his fiercest rivals, Nigel Mansell. It was reported that Honda were paying the bulk of his US$3.3 million contract. When Piquet had signed for Williams at 1985 Austrian Grand Prix, Piquet did not regard Mansell as a serious threat, as the Briton had not won a race yet in his fifth year in Formula One (and would win his first race a month later). Piquet had underestimated Mansell, and the Englishman came out of 1985 on a confidence high after winning two of the last three races in 1985. Both were regarded as high-strung characters with delicate temperaments, and two top drivers in the same team was a recipe for fireworks – and sure enough Mansell and Piquet went head to head for the title. Piquet had wanted to play the role as the number one driver. According to Piquet, the verbal agreement with Frank Williams on this point was clear, and Williams's comment that in signing Piquet he had "signed the best driver in the world" seemed to back that up. However, shortly before the beginning of the season, Frank Williams suffered a serious car accident that kept him away from the team for a long time and caused a permanent physical disability. The team was then led by technical director Patrick Head, who was also Mansell's race engineer.

Though the two drove what were clearly the best cars on the grid, their rivalry caused each to deprive the other of points, allowing Alain Prost to win one of the closest and most fiercely disputed championships ever in Formula One. The season began well with Piquet dominating the Brazilian Grand Prix and at the next the race, the San Marino Grand Prix, Piquet finished second behind Prost. During the season, fellow Brazilian and former dual-World Champion Emerson Fittipaldi estimated that Piquet could not commit more driving errors early in the season when he was judged as the best driver in the field.

Piquet (and reportedly Honda) left Adelaide following the Australian Grand Prix, fuming that Williams had not honoured their contract and had allowed Mansell to win races instead of ordering him to let the Brazilian by. Had Mansell let Piquet pass to take some extra wins, Piquet could have easily won the championship, instead of the two of them being beaten by Prost in what was an inferior car (though Prost did manage 11 podium finishes, including four wins). In this season Piquet won more races (a total of four) than he would in any of his championship-winning campaigns.

==== 1987: Third and final World Championship ====
Piquet made amends in 1987, using political maneuvering and technical skill to gain the upper hand. He was also a very good testing and development driver, and was able to develop the Williams car further to make it even more competitive. At times during the season, the rift between himself and Mansell was evident, as Mansell was showing superior speed in qualifying and races. Piquet had also admitted to "not ever being quite right" after his qualifying crash for Round 2 at Imola. He was ordered by FISA's medical chief, Sid Watkins, not to race due to the concussion he suffered when his Williams hit the wall at high speed at the Tamburello curve. He was offered by RAI to join Mario Poltronieri and Clay Regazzoni to comment on the race. Piquet, who had maintained friendly relations within the commentary box, sent Ezio Zermiani. Piquet accepted improvising as a commentator, but beyond the short journalistic experience, Piquet complained at year-end about the fact that the incident had left strong psychological effects in its aftermath which had caused insomnia.

It became obvious that the continued development of the FW11 meant that it was clearly the best car that year, and the 1987 championship was going to be disputed between Piquet and Mansell. Despite winning fewer races than Mansell in 1987, Piquet emerged as world champion. From Detroit to Portugal, he never finished off the podium, racking up points in what he called his "percentage driving policy" in his successful bid to win his third championship. Piquet announced during practice for the 1987 Hungarian Grand Prix that he had signed with Lotus as the undisputed number one driver, a position he claimed was promised at Williams from 1985, but was never honored following Frank Williams' car crash in beginning of 1986. It was also believed this was a big factor in Honda dropping Williams and moving to McLaren for 1988, despite another year left in the contract. The Japanese company, who paid most of Piquet's salary, considered him to be the number one and were privately fuming that Williams management did not rein in Mansell and allow Piquet an easier time.

Later in a 2012 interview on Brazilian TV alongside Mansell, Piquet revealed that his health had deteriorated after his accident at Imola in 1987. He lost 80% of his depth perception as a result of the crash and secretly visited a hospital in Milan every two weeks throughout the season, fearing that he would be disallowed from driving if the team was made aware of his condition. He went on to remark that he should have won the championship in 1986 and Mansell should have won in 1987, and that after 1987 he drove for the money as due to his condition he was no longer able to lead races from the front (each of his six wins following his Imola accident were inherited from others dropping out late).

=== Lotus (1988–1989) ===
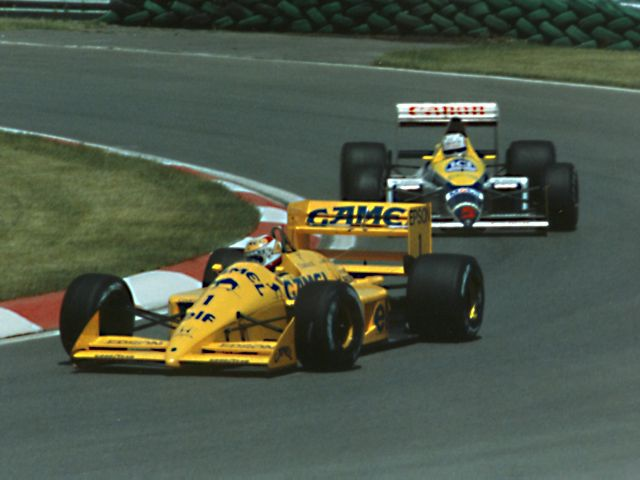
Piquet driving for Lotus at the 1988 Canadian Grand Prix, leading Nigel Mansell in a Williams.

==== 1988 ====
Piquet and the number 1 went to a stagnating Lotus team in 1988, and his career took a nose dive despite the Camel sponsored Lotus 100T having the same specification Honda V6 turbo that powered the almost totally dominant McLarens of Ayrton Senna and Alain Prost – the 100T was a very poor chassis that was riddled with aerodynamic issues, was constantly flexing and was not properly compatible with the engine. Piquet, who had 20 wins and three World Championships following the 1987 season, began to lose his reputation when he had no wins in 1988, losing his number one status to fellow Brazilian Senna, who won eight races and the championship for McLaren (Prost won seven races, while Piquet could only manage three third-place finishes for the season).

In early 1988, he used the media to attack his rivals and gained a reputation as an outspoken "loose cannon," such as attacking Mansell and his wife, calling Mansell "an uneducated blockhead" (and insulting his wife's looks), and calling fellow Brazilian Senna "the São Paulo taxi driver" and stating that he "doesn't like women". Piquet retracted his comments when both threatened legal action. He also earned the ire of the Tifosi at the San Marino Grand Prix when he said in an interview with Playboy that Scuderia Ferrari might do better as a team if the boss (Enzo Ferrari) was a younger man instead of the 90-year-old one who rarely attended races due to his age and failing health (in fact, Enzo would pass away in August of that year). Piquet claims he was badly misquoted in the interview, which also had him questioning Prost's standing as the best driver in the world. On the official FIA video review of the 1988 season, Piquet left no doubts that the article got it wrong in his comments about Ferrari (saying that at 90, Enzo Ferrari had to be a strong man to run a Formula One team), and that he considered Prost to be the world's best driver.

Before the start of the 1988 season, the Rio de Janeiro circuit was renamed in Piquet's honor.

==== 1989 ====
Piquet had a disappointing 1989 season, driving a Judd V8-powered Lotus which had 125 less hp than the Honda V10s used by McLaren. He did, however, have an excellent (considering the Lotus car's limitations) fourth place in the British Grand Prix at Silverstone where he overtook theoretically faster cars and was running third until Alessandro Nannini overtook him in the last few laps. He (and teammate Satoru Nakajima) once again had no wins and they both even failed to qualify for the 1989 Belgian Grand Prix, Piquet's first non-qualification since the 1982 Detroit Grand Prix. On what was his last attempt to qualify at Spa, Piquet lost his chance when he was slowed by rookie Frenchman Olivier Grouillard, who had gained a reputation throughout the season as a blocker.

=== Benetton (1990–1991) ===
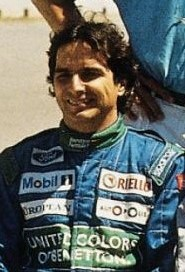
Piquet in 1990

==== 1990 ====
When Lotus informed Piquet during 1989 that they would be using the Lamborghini V12 engine for 1990, he decided to leave the team claiming that there had not been enough development of the V12 during its debut year with Larrousse in 1989 and that the team would be uncompetitive using the Italian engine.

The late season announcement by Lotus meant that there were almost no seats left with one of the top teams (McLaren, Ferrari and Williams), leaving Piquet with the unenviable possibility of not having a drive for 1990. However, the Benetton team had a seat become available when they decided not to retain fill-in driver Emanuele Pirro. After two lacklustre seasons at Lotus, Piquet was forced to sign an incentive based payment-by-results deal with Benetton, who had acquired the services of John Barnard for their 1990 car, the B190 and had exclusive use of the factory Ford-Cosworth HB4 V8 engine. This saw Piquet return to something like his former top form in 1990.

Despite a handful of lacklustre performances and sometimes being outperformed by fast Italian teammate Alessandro Nannini who was forced into retirement before the Spanish Grand Prix (after his right forearm had to be surgically re-attached following a helicopter crash) Piquet scored two wins in the last two races of the season. The first in Japan was somewhat inherited after Senna had taken out Prost's Ferrari at the first turn, and both Gerhard Berger (McLaren) and Mansell (Ferrari) retired. It was his first win since the 1987 Italian Grand Prix. The second was just two weeks later at the last race of the season in Australia when after a great drive, Piquet survived a spirited, but fair, challenge from the V12 Ferrari of Mansell to win what was the 500th World Championship Formula One Grand Prix. His 18 points from the last two races saw him move from seventh in the standings (26 points) to finishing third in the championship with 43. Piquet and Gerhard Berger both scored 43 points (Piquet had scored 44 but was forced to drop one point under the "Best 11" rule of the time), but Piquet's two wins, where Berger won none, saw him finish third.

==== 1991 ====
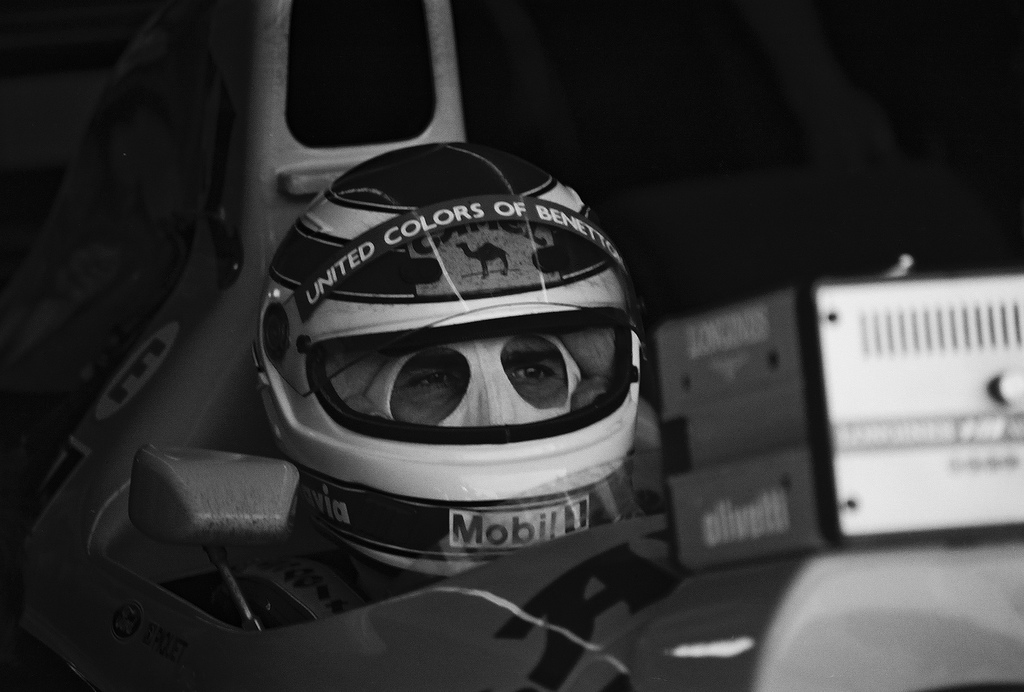
Piquet at the 1991 United States Grand Prix

This was followed by the final win of Piquet's F1 career at Montreal in 1991 – again at the expense of longtime rival Mansell, whose Williams-Renault stalled past the old pits on the last lap while leading. In late 1991, Piquet's teammate Roberto Moreno was replaced by Michael Schumacher, who remained for the rest of the season. He had talked to the Ligier and Ferrari teams about securing a drive, but Piquet then announced his retirement from Formula One in January 1992 to concentrate on his business activities.

== Other racing ventures ==
=== Indianapolis 500 (1992–1993) ===
Piquet attempted to race in the Indy car series and was hired by Team Menard to drive in the 1992 Indianapolis 500. He had taken to the track well, and appeared comfortable driving at high speeds despite never before racing on an oval. During practice, Piquet's car ran over a metallic piece of debris and drove through turn 3 at full speed. When driving through turn 4, Piquet abruptly took his foot off the pedal to enter the pit lane, which resulted in the car spinning and hitting the wall. Piquet suffered serious foot and ankle injuries and was forced to sit out the race. He returned after rehabilitation in 1993 and managed to qualify. He started in 13th position, but finished in 32nd, dropping out with engine problems after only 38 laps.

=== Sports cars (1980–1981, 1996–1997 and 2006) ===
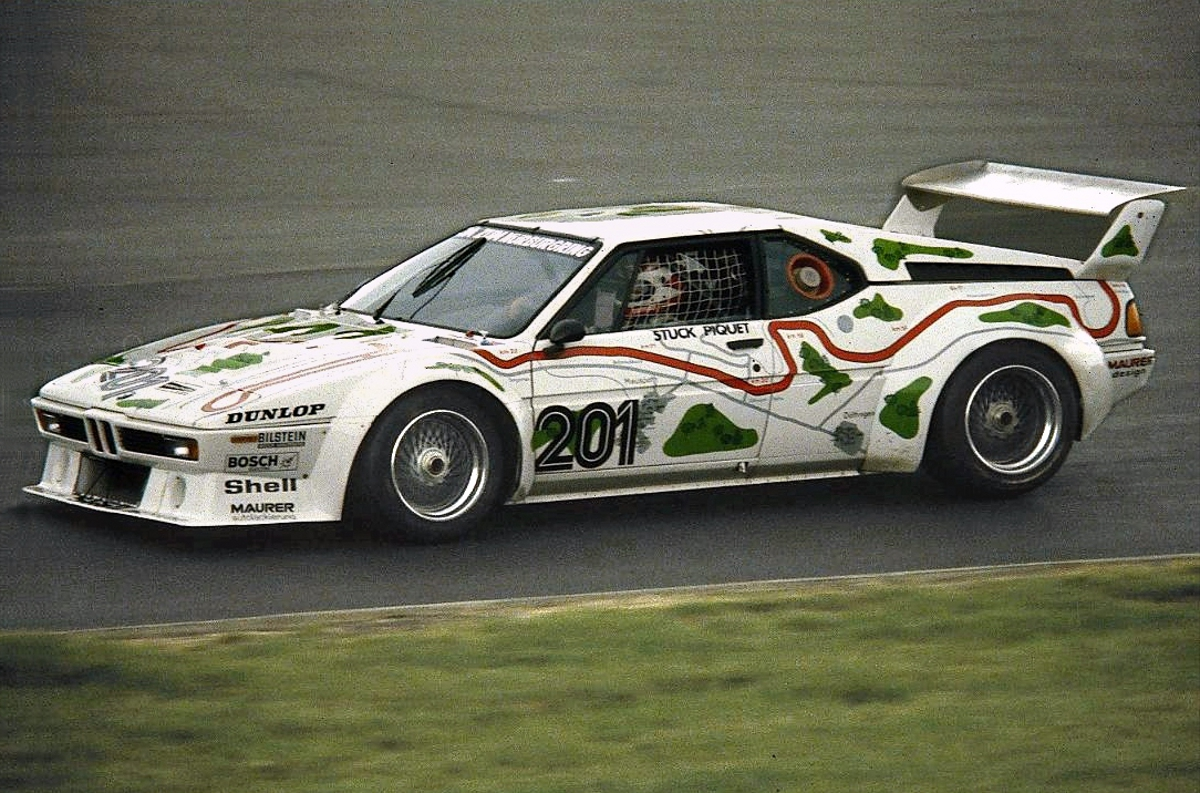
Piquet driving a BMW M1 sports car at the Nürburgring in 1980.

Alongside Formula One, Piquet took part in the 1000km Nürburgring in 1980 and 1981 driving a BMW M1. He won the 1981 race alongside the German Hans-Joachim Stuck. However, the race had to be stopped roughly two hours in because of the fatal crash of Herbert Müller after 17 laps of the 14-mile (23 km) course.

In 1996, Piquet competed in the Le Mans 24 Hours driving a McLaren F1 GTR alongside Johnny Cecotto and Danny Sullivan, finishing eighth overall. In the following year, Piquet took part alongside JJ Lehto and Steve Soper, but the car was retired due to an accident that occurred while Lehto was driving. That same year, he won the 2 Hours of Curitiba and the 2 Hours of Brasília in the BPR Global GT Series with Johnny Cecotto.

In December 1997, he won the Mil Milhas Brasileiras driving the McLaren F1 GTR with Johnny Cecotto and Steve Soper.

On 20 January 2006, Piquet won the 50th edition of the Mil Milhas Brasileiras (Brazilian 1,000 miles) at the Interlagos circuit. He drove an Aston Martin DBR9 alongside his son, Nelson Piquet Jr., and drivers Christophe Bouchut and Hélio Castroneves. At the end of the race, an exhausted Piquet was quoted saying to a friend he would "never sit in a cockpit again."

=== Driver management ===
Since 2000, Piquet has supported the career of his son, Nelson Piquet Jr., who drove in the F1-feeder category GP2 for 2 seasons, achieving a best championship result of second with four race wins, and was a test driver for Renault F1 in 2007. During the Crashgate scandal, the elder Piquet pledged to use his wealth to find out why his son had been ordered by the Renault team to crash deliberately during the 2008 Singapore Grand Prix. He and his son were eventually paid a six-figure sum for costs and libel damages.

== Helmet ==
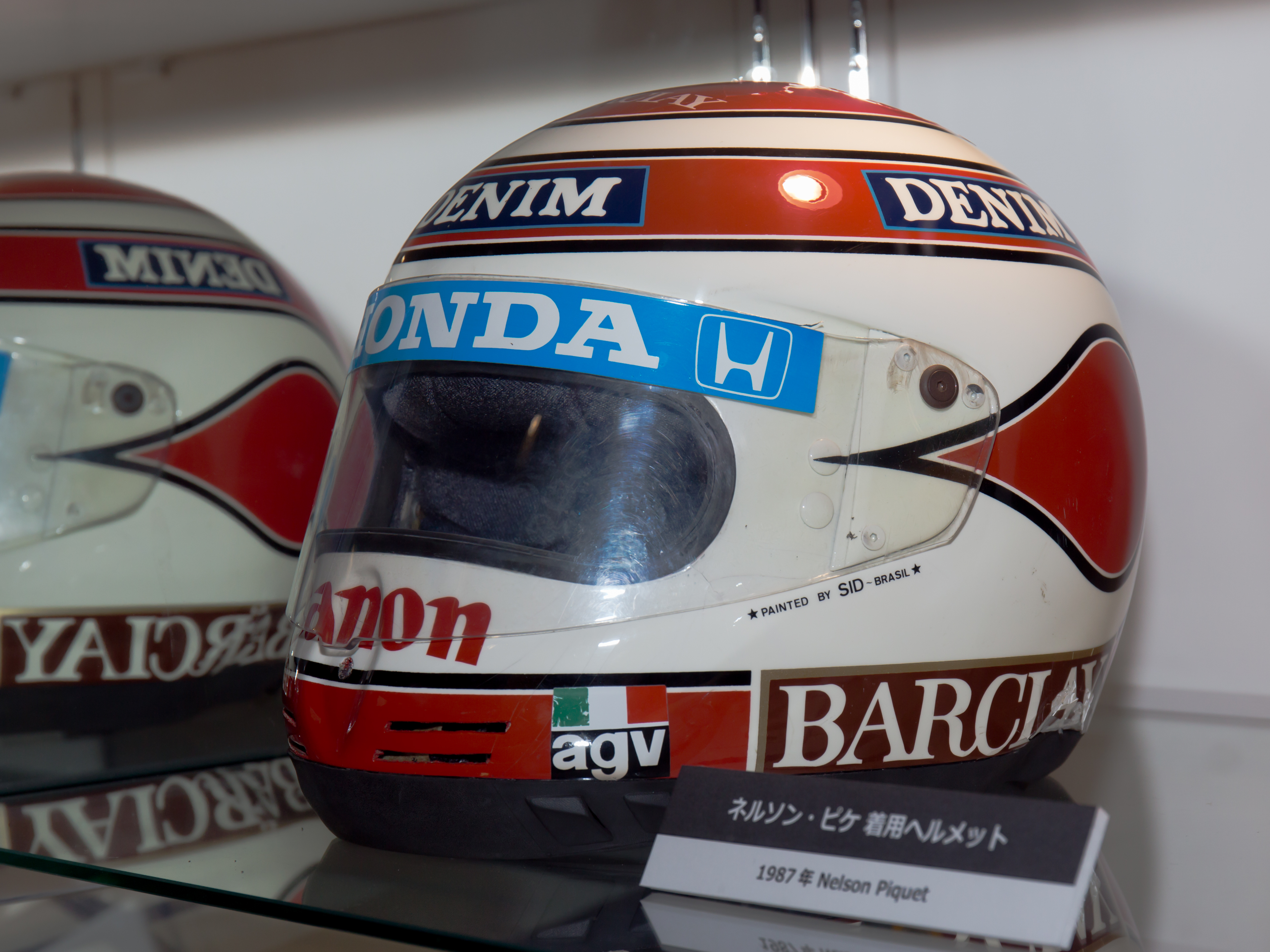
Piquet's helmet in 1987.

Piquet's helmet is white and red with a thick line resembling the seam on a tennis ball (possibly due to his father wanting him to be a tennis player), and teardrop shapes filling in the round areas on the sides and top. The seam and teardrops were usually red or orange with black trim, but some parts were yellow during his Lotus years due to the Camel sponsorship, and reverted to a deep red when he left Lotus for Benetton. His sons Nelson Jr. and Pedro followed his helmet design.

== Business ventures ==
Upon leaving motor sport, he founded Autotrac in 1992, a company that provides mobile data messaging and tracking of customers' trucks by satellite (GPS tracking). This business concluded quite successfully as the pioneer because the freight transportation of Brazil depended on trucks.

Piquet founded a racing team, Piquet Sports, in 2000. The purpose was to help the participation of Nelson Piquet Jr. in Formula Three Sudamericana. It was founded eight months before Nelson Junior turned 16.

Piquet runs some other businesses, based in Brasília.

Piquet's net worth is around US$200 million currently.

== Legacy ==
Piquet was inducted into the International Motorsports Hall of Fame in 2000 and two racing circuits in Rio de Janeiro (formerly the Jacarepaguá Circuit) and in Brasília have been named "Autódromo Internacional Nelson Piquet", though the Rio circuit has since been demolished to make way for venues to be used in the 2016 Summer Olympics, with Rio de Janeiro the host city. Since his retirement, Piquet has been ranked among the greatest Formula One drivers. He was ranked 13th by Autosport in 2009, and 16th by BBC Sport in 2012.

== Personal life ==
Known as a practical joker, Piquet lived a stereotypically playboy racing driver lifestyle, earning and losing and earning again a series of small fortunes in his business dealings. He remains a competitive driver in sports car racing, albeit more for fun than with serious intent. Never a fan of street circuits (save for Adelaide in Australia), he was critical of the Monaco Grand Prix and famously stated that Monaco was like "riding a bicycle around your living room." On the other hand, he loved the Monza Circuit, stating that "a win there was worth two anywhere else," where he achieved three victories in 1983, 1986 and 1987.

Piquet's first marriage lasted one year, during which a son was born in 1977. His second produced three children, including Nelson Angelo Piquet and Kelly Piquet. He also has another son from a previous relationship. He has two children with his current wife, including Pedro Estácio Piquet.

On 11 November 2013, Piquet underwent heart surgery from which he made a complete recovery.

As of 2022, Piquet lives in a mansion located in the suburbs of Brasília. Inside the property, there is a farm, a private automobile museum, and an airstrip.

=== Relationships with other drivers ===
Piquet was known for insulting and slandering other drivers during and after his racing career. In 1988, Piquet made comments in a magazine about his rival Nigel Mansell, calling him an "uneducated blockhead" and describing his wife as "ugly". He also falsely accused Ayrton Senna of being homosexual and called Enzo Ferrari "senile", adding to the latter statement that the Ferrari team would have performed better at the time if Ferrari was 30 years younger. Mansell was in particular incensed about the personal attacks on his family which he described as "out of order", while Senna countered the accusations against his sexuality in a 1990 interview with the Brazilian edition of Playboy where he revealed that he lost his virginity to a prostitute when he was 13 years old. Senna speculated in the same interview that Piquet loathed him because he once had sexual intercourse with Piquet's then-future wife. Despite Senna's high-profile relationships with Brazilian television personalities like Xuxa from 1988 to 1990 and Adriane Galisteu at the time of his death in 1994, Piquet continued to publicly refer to Senna as "gay" as late as 2020.

=== Legal issues ===
On 31 July 2007, Piquet was stripped of his civilian driving licence after repeated speeding and parking offenses. He was ordered by the Brazilian courts to attend a week of driving lessons before taking an exam in order to "learn good and safe driving conduct". His wife Viviane received the same sentence. "I think we have to pay for our mistakes," Piquet told Brazilian media. "It's not just a speeding problem. I got tickets for all kinds of reasons, like parking where I shouldn't."

In March 2023, Piquet was ordered by a Brazilian court to pay R$5,000,000 (approximately US$950,000) in moral damages for the supposedly racist statements he had made against Lewis Hamilton in a 2021 interview.

== Controversies ==
Piquet's habit of making offensive statements against other drivers received widespread public condemnation after Piquet appeared on a Brazilian podcast in 2021 and referred to Lewis Hamilton by the Portuguese term "neguinho" while discussing an incident between Hamilton and Max Verstappen at the 2021 British Grand Prix. After the comments resurfaced on social media in 2022, his use of the racial slur received condemnation from Hamilton and F1. Piquet later apologised for his remarks, explaining that they were not intended to be racist. Following this apology, Piquet received further condemnation for also using homophobic language against Hamilton in the same interview and describing Keke Rosberg, the 1982 Formula One World Champion, as "a worthless turd".

In July 2022, Piquet was banned from the F1 paddock as a result of the slanderous statements made against Hamilton. Craig Slater of Sky Sports F1 reported that despite his apology, Piquet, "for the foreseeable future at least, will not be welcome in the Formula 1 paddock". The British Racing Drivers' Club also suspended Piquet's membership, and were expected to terminate his status as an honorary member, following a 7-day notice period. The ban from the F1 paddock was lifted by the end of 2024, and Piquet was present at the São Paulo Grand Prix as a guest of Red Bull.

== In popular culture ==
Piquet was portrayed by Hugo Bonemer in the 2024 Senna miniseries, a dramatization of the life and racing career of Ayrton Senna.

== Racing record ==
=== Career summary ===
Season	Series	Team	Races	Wins	Poles	F/Laps	Podiums	Points	Position
1972	Campeonato Brasiliense de Divisão 4		4	1	1	1	2	?	?
1972	Prêmio Aniversário de Brasília		1	0	0	0	0	N/A	4th
1974	Formula Super Vê Brasil	Ideal Induspina	5	1	1	1	1	16	4th
1975	Formula Super Vê Brasil		6	0	0	0	0	2	14th
1976	Formula VW 1600 Brasil	Gledson	10	6	5	7	7	98	**1st**
1976	Cascavel de Ouro – 7° edição		1	1	0	0	1	N/A	**1st**
1977	FIA European Formula 3 Championship	Scuderia Mirabella Mille Miglia	11	2	1	2	5	33	**3rd**
1977	Vandervell British Formula Three	Scuderia Mirabella Mille Miglia	3	0	1	?	2	32	7th
1977	Italian Formula Three	Scuderia Mirabella Mille Miglia	1	0	0	0	0	0	NC
1978	Super Visco British Formula Three	Brastemp/Armo/Hobby	15	8	9	?	11	101	**1st**
1978	Vandervell British Formula Three	Brastemp/Armo/Hobby	7	5	2	?	6	124	**2nd**
1978	Formula One	BS Fabrications	3	0	0	0	0	0	NC
1978	Formula One	Team Tissot Ensign	1	0	0	0	0	0	NC
1978	Formula One	Parmalat Racing	1	0	0	0	0	0	NC
1979	Formula One	Parmalat Racing	15	0	0	1	0	3	15th
1979	BMW M1 Procar Championship	BMW Motorsport	4	1	1	0	2	35	6th
1980	Formula One	Parmalat Racing	14	3	2	1	6	54	**2nd**
1980	BMW M1 Procar Championship	BMW Motorsport	7	3	1	0	4	90	**1st**
1981	Formula One	Parmalat Racing	15	3	4	1	7	50	**1st**
1981	World Sportscar Championship	GS Tuning	1	1	0	0	1	10.5	252nd
1982	Formula One	Parmalat Racing	14	1	1	2	2	20	11th
1983	Formula One	Fila Sport	15	3	1	4	8	59	**1st**
1984	Formula One	MRD International	16	2	9	3	4	29	5th
1985	Formula One	Olivetti Racing	16	1	1	0	2	21	8th
1986	Formula One	Canon Williams Honda Team	16	4	2	7	10	69	**3rd**
1987	Formula One	Canon Williams Honda Team	15	3	4	4	11	76	**1st**
1988	Formula One	Camel Team Lotus Honda	16	0	0	0	3	22	6th
1989	Formula One	Camel Team Lotus	15	0	0	0	0	12	8th
1990	Formula One	Benetton Formula	16	2	0	0	4	44	**3rd**
1991	Formula One	Camel Benetton Formula	16	1	0	0	3	26.5	6th
1992	PPG Indy Car World Series	Team Menard	0	0	0	0	0	0	NC
1993	PPG Indy Car World Series	Team Menard	1	0	0	0	0	0	55th
1996	24 Hours of Le Mans	Team Bigazzi SRL	1	0	0	0	0	0	8th
1997	24 Hours of Le Mans	Team BMW Motorsport	1	0	0	0	0	0	DNF

=== Complete European Formula 3 results ===
(key) (Races in bold indicate pole position) (Races in italics indicate fastest lap)

Year	Entrant	Engine	1	2	3	4	5	6	7	8	9	10	11	12	13	14	DC	Pts
1977	Scuderia Mirabella Mille Miglia	Toyota	LEC; DNQ	NÜR; 11	ZAN; Ret	ZOL; 8	ÖST; 3	IMO; 7	PER; Ret	MNZ	CRO; 3	KNU; 2	KAS; 1	DON; 6	**JAR**; 1	VAL; DNQ	**3rd**	**33**

=== Complete Vandervell British F3 Championship results ===
(key) (Races in bold indicate pole position) (Races in italics indicate fastest lap)

Year	Entrant	Engine	1	2	3	4	5	6	7	8	9	10	DC	Pts
1977	Scuderia Mirabella Mille Miglia	Toyota	SIL	BRH	SIL	SIL; 3	DON; 6	**SIL**; 3	SIL				7th	32
1978	Brastemp/Armo/Hobby	Toyota	SIL; 5	SIL; 1	SIL; 3	**OUL**; 1	MAL	DON	**SIL**; 1	SIL; 1	SIL; 1	BRH	**2nd**	**124**

=== Complete Super Visco British F3 Championship results ===
(key) (Races in bold indicate pole position) (Races in italics indicate fastest lap)

Year	Entrant	Engine	1	2	3	4	5	6	7	8	9	10	11	12	13	14	15	16	17	DC	Pts
1978	Brastemp/Armo/Hobby	Toyota	THR; 4	THR; 2	BRH; 2	**OUL**; Ret	DON; 1	MON; DNQ	**MAL**; 1	THR; 1	**BRH**; 1	**CAD**; 1	**LEC**; 1	**SIL**; 1	**BRH**; 4	**DON**; 2	**SNE**; 1	MAL	THR	**1st**	**101**

=== Complete Formula One World Championship results ===
(key) (Races in bold indicate pole position; races in italics indicate fastest lap)

Year	Entrant	Chassis	Engine	1	2	3	4	5	6	7	8	9	10	11	12	13	14	15	16	WDC	Points
1978	Team Tissot Ensign	Ensign N177	Ford DFV 3.0 V8	ARG	BRA	RSA	USW	MON	BEL	ESP	SWE	FRA	GBR	GER; Ret						NC	0
1978	BS Fabrications	McLaren M23	Ford DFV 3.0 V8												AUT; Ret	NED; Ret	ITA; 9	USA		NC	0
1978	Parmalat Racing	Brabham BT46	Alfa Romeo 115–12 3.0 F12																CAN; 11	NC	0
1979	Parmalat Racing	Brabham BT46	Alfa Romeo 115–12 3.0 F12	ARG; Ret																15th	3
1979	Parmalat Racing	Brabham BT48	Alfa Romeo 1260 3.0 V12		BRA; Ret	RSA; 7	USW; 8	ESP; Ret	BEL; Ret	MON; Ret	FRA; Ret	GBR; Ret	GER; 12^{†}	AUT; Ret	NED; 4	ITA; Ret				15th	3
1979	Parmalat Racing	Brabham BT49	Ford DFV 3.0 V8														CAN; Ret	USA; Ret		15th	3
1980	Parmalat Racing	Brabham BT49	Ford DFV 3.0 V8	ARG; 2	BRA; Ret	RSA; 4	**USW**; 1	BEL; Ret	MON; 3	FRA; 4	GBR; 2	GER; 4	AUT; 5	NED; 1	ITA; 1	**CAN**; Ret	USA; Ret			**2nd**	**54**
1981	Parmalat Racing	Brabham BT49C	Ford DFV 3.0 V8	USW; 3	**BRA**; 12	**ARG**; 1	SMR; 1	BEL; Ret	**MON**; Ret	ESP; Ret	FRA; 3	GBR; Ret	GER; 1	AUT; 3	NED; 2	ITA; 6^{†}	**CAN**; 5	CPL; 5		**1st**	**50**
1982	Parmalat Racing	Brabham BT50	BMW M12/13 1.5 L4 t	RSA; Ret				BEL; 5	MON; Ret	DET; DNQ	CAN; 1	NED; 2	GBR; Ret	FRA; Ret	GER; Ret	**AUT**; Ret	SUI; 4	ITA; Ret	CPL; Ret	11th	20
1982	Parmalat Racing	Brabham BT49D	Ford DFV 3.0 V8		BRA; DSQ	USW; Ret	SMR													11th	20
1983	Fila Sport	Brabham BT52	BMW M12/13 1.5 L4 t	BRA; 1	USW; Ret	FRA; 2	SMR; Ret	MON; 2	BEL; 4	DET; 4	CAN; Ret									**1st**	**59**
1983	Fila Sport	Brabham BT52B	BMW M12/13 1.5 L4 t									GBR; 2	GER; 13^{†}	AUT; 3	**NED**; Ret	ITA; 1	EUR; 1	RSA; 3		**1st**	**59**
1984	MRD International	Brabham BT53	BMW M12/13 1.5 L4 t	BRA; Ret	**RSA**; Ret	BEL; 9^{†}	**SMR**; Ret	FRA; Ret	MON; Ret	**CAN**; 1	**DET**; 1	DAL; Ret	**GBR**; 7	GER; Ret	**AUT**; 2	NED; Ret	**ITA**; Ret	**EUR**; 3	**POR**; 6	5th	29
1985	Olivetti Racing	Brabham BT54	BMW M12/13 1.5 L4 t	BRA; Ret	POR; Ret	SMR; 8^{†}	MON; Ret	CAN; Ret	DET; 6	FRA; 1	GBR; 4	GER; Ret	AUT; Ret	**NED**; 8	ITA; 2	BEL; 5	EUR; Ret	RSA; Ret	AUS; Ret	8th	21
1986	Canon Williams Honda Team	Williams FW11	Honda RA166E 1.5 V6 t	BRA; 1	ESP; Ret	SMR; 2	MON; 7	**BEL**; Ret	CAN; 3	DET; Ret	FRA; 3	**GBR**; 2	GER; 1	HUN; 1	AUT; Ret	ITA; 1	POR; 3	MEX; 4	AUS; 2	**3rd**	**69**
1987	Canon Williams Honda Team	Williams FW11B	Honda RA167E 1.5 V6 t	BRA; 2	SMR; DNS	BEL; Ret	MON; 2	DET; 2	FRA; 2	**GBR**; 2	GER; 1	HUN; 1	**AUT**; 2	**ITA**; 1	POR; 3	**ESP**; 4	MEX; 2	JPN; 15^{†}	AUS; Ret	**1st**	**73 (76)**
1988	Camel Team Lotus Honda	Lotus 100T	Honda RA168E 1.5 V6 t	BRA; 3	SMR; 3	MON; Ret	MEX; Ret	CAN; 4	DET; Ret	FRA; 5	GBR; 5	GER; Ret	HUN; 8	BEL; 4	ITA; Ret	POR; Ret	ESP; 8	JPN; Ret	AUS; 3	6th	22
1989	Camel Team Lotus	Lotus 101	Judd CV 3.5 V8	BRA; Ret	SMR; Ret	MON; Ret	MEX; 11	USA; Ret	CAN; 4	FRA; 8	GBR; 4	GER; 5	HUN; 6	BEL; DNQ	ITA; Ret	POR; Ret	ESP; 8	JPN; 4	AUS; Ret	8th	12
1990	Benetton Formula	Benetton B189B	Ford HBA4 3.5 V8	USA; 4	BRA; 6															**3rd**	**43 (44)**
1990	Benetton Formula	Benetton B190	Ford HBA4 3.5 V8			SMR; 5	MON; DSQ	CAN; 2	MEX; 6	FRA; 4	GBR; 5	GER; Ret	HUN; 3	BEL; 5	ITA; 7	POR; 5	ESP; Ret	JPN; 1	AUS; 1	**3rd**	**43 (44)**
1991	Camel Benetton Ford	Benetton B190B	Ford HBA5 3.5 V8	USA; 3	BRA; 5															6th	26.5
1991	Camel Benetton Ford	Benetton B191	Ford HBA5 3.5 V8			SMR; Ret	MON; Ret	CAN; 1	MEX; Ret	FRA; 8	GBR; 5	GER; Ret	HUN; Ret	BEL; 3	ITA; 6	POR; 5	ESP; 11	JPN; 7	AUS; 4	6th	26.5

^{†} Did not finish, but was classified as he had completed more than 90% of the race distance.

=== Formula One non-championship results ===
(key) (Races in bold indicate pole position) (Races in italics indicate fastest lap)

Year	Entrant	Chassis	Engine	1	2	3
1979	Parmalat Racing	Brabham BT48	Alfa Romeo 3.0 Flat-12	ROC; 2	GUN	DIN
1980	Parmalat Racing	Brabham BT49	Ford DFV 3.0 V8	ESP; Ret		
1981	Parmalat Racing	Brabham BT49B	Ford DFV 3.0 V8	**RSA**; 2		

=== Complete BMW M1 Procar Championship results ===
(key) (Races in bold indicate pole position; races in italics indicate fastest lap)

Year	Entrant	1	2	3	4	5	6	7	8	9	DC	Pts
1979	BMW Motorsport	ZOL; DNS	MCO	**DIJ**; 1	SIL; 2	HOC	ÖST	ZAN; Ret	MNZ; Ret		6th	35
1980	BMW Motorsport	DON	AVS; Ret	MCO; 3	NOR; Ret	BRH	HOC; 4	ÖST; 1	ZAN; 1	**IMO**; 1	**1st**	**90**

=== Complete PPG IndyCar World Series results ===
(key) (Races in bold indicate pole position)

Year	Team	No.	Chassis	Engine	1	2	3	4	5	6	7	8	9	10	11	12	13	14	15	16	Rank	Points	Ref
1992	Team Menard	77	Lola T92/00	Buick 3300 V6 t	SRF	PHX	LBH	INDY; Wth	DET	POR	MIL	NHA	TOR	MCH	CLE	ROA	VAN	MDO	NAZ	LAG	**NC**	-	
1993	Team Menard	77	Lola T93/00	Menard V6 t	SRF	PHX	LBH	INDY; 32	MIL	DET	POR	CLE	TOR	MCH	NHA	ROA	VAN	MDO	NAZ	LAG	**NC**	**0**	

==== Indianapolis 500 ====
Year	Chassis	Engine	Start	Finish	Entrant
1992	Lola	Buick	DNS	N/A	Menard
1993	Lola	Buick	13th	32nd	Menard

=== 24 Hours of Le Mans results ===
Year	Team	Co-Drivers	Car	Class	Laps	Pos.	Class Pos.
1996	(Italy) Team Bigazzi (Germany) Team BMW Motorsport	(Venezuela) Johnny Cecotto (United States) Danny Sullivan	McLaren F1 GTR	GT1	324	8th	6th
1997	(Germany) Team BMW Motorsport (Germany) BMW Team Schnitzer	(Finland) JJ Lehto (United Kingdom) Steve Soper	McLaren F1 GTR	GT1	236	DNF	DNF

== Notes ==
Sporting positions
Preceded by Derek Daly	British Formula Three; BARC Series Champion; 1978	Succeeded by Chico Serra (Combined championship)
Preceded by Niki Lauda	BMW M1 Procar Championship; Champion; 1980	Succeeded by None (Series ended)
Preceded by Alan Jones	Formula One World Champion; 1981	Succeeded by Keke Rosberg
Preceded by Keke Rosberg	Formula One World Champion; 1983	Succeeded by Niki Lauda
Preceded by Alain Prost	Formula One World Champion; 1987	Succeeded by Ayrton Senna
Awards and achievements
Preceded by Keke Rosberg	Autosport; International Racing Driver Award; 1983	Succeeded by Niki Lauda
