= Project Four Racing =

British auto racing team

(United Kingdom) Project Four Racing
- Founded: 1976
- Folded: 1980 (merged with McLaren)
- Team principal(s): Ron Dennis
- Former series: European Formula Two Championship; British Formula 3 Championship; BMW M1 Procar Championship
- Drivers' Championships: British Formula 3 Championship: 1980: Stefan Johansson; BMW M1 Procar Championship: 1979: Niki Lauda

Project Four Racing was a British Formula Two and Formula Three team. The team was founded in 1976 by former Brabham mechanic Ron Dennis. At the end of 1980, the team merged with the McLaren Formula One team.

The team name lived on in the designation of the McLaren F1 race cars from 1981 to the 2016 season, all McLarens, starting with the John Barnard designed McLaren MP4/1, had carried the "MP4" name, with MP4 standing for "Marlboro Project 4" and later "McLaren Project 4". The road car McLaren MP4-12C also carried the prefix until it was dropped for the 2012 model year. From 2017 onward, after the departure of Dennis from McLaren, the team began to designate their cars with the name "MCL".

== Racing history ==
=== Formula Two ===
The team competed in the European Formula Two Championship. Driving a BMW powered Ralt RT1, Eddie Cheever recorded the team's first race win in 1977 in the second of two races making up Round 4 at the Nürburgring on his way to finishing second for the round. Cheever then went on to win Round 8 at the Rouen-Les-Essarts circuit. He finished the season in second place, 12 points behind René Arnoux.

Over the next three seasons, Project Four would win just four more races before the team moved into Formula One with its last win coming thanks to Andrea de Cesaris who won Round 8 of the 1980 season at Misano in Italy driving a March 802-BMW.

=== Formula Three ===
Project Four also raced in the British Formula Three Championship. Its first win came thanks to Chico Serra, who won the opening round of the 1979 championship on Silverstone's Club Circuit driving a Toyota powered March 793. Serra won five of the seasons twenty races to win the championship from Andrea de Cesaris who drove a March 793-Toyota for Tiga. Stefan Johansson won the 1980 British Formula Three Championship driving for Project Four Racing.

=== BMW M1 Procar Championship ===
For the BMW M1 Procar Championship, all cars were built to identical standards, although their origins varied. BS Fabrications constructed five cars for the BMW factory team, while cars for other competitors were constructed by Project Four Racing or the Italian constructor Osella. The racing cars, designed to meet Group 4 technical regulations, shared only some basics from the M1 road cars.

In 1979, Procar constructor Project Four entered a car for Niki Lauda when he was not in the factory entries. Lauda won 3 races for P4, and the series, before retiring from F1 racing in late September. In 1980, Hans-Joachim Stuck won two events for P4, finishing 3rd overall.

== Complete European Formula Two results ==
(key) (Results in bold indicate pole position; results in italics indicate fastest lap.)

Year	Chassis	Engine(s)	Drivers	1	2	3	4	5	6	7	8	9	10	11	12	13
1976	March 752 762; Ralt RT1	Lancia-Ferrari; Hart 420R		HOC	THR	VAL	SAL	PAU	HOC	ROU	MUG	PER	EST	NOG	HOC	
1976	March 752 762; Ralt RT1	Lancia-Ferrari; Hart 420R	(United States) Eddie Cheever	DNQ	4	DSQ	Ret	Ret	Ret	Ret		3	5	8	15	
1976	March 752 762; Ralt RT1	Lancia-Ferrari; Hart 420R	(West Germany) Jochen Mass	DNQ												
1976	March 752 762; Ralt RT1	Lancia-Ferrari; Hart 420R	(Italy) Vittorio Brambilla			Ret										
1976	March 752 762; Ralt RT1	Lancia-Ferrari; Hart 420R	(Canada) Gilles Villeneuve					Ret								
1976	March 752 762; Ralt RT1	Lancia-Ferrari; Hart 420R	(Finland) Mikko Kozarowitsky							DNQ	17	Ret				
1976	March 752 762; Ralt RT1	Lancia-Ferrari; Hart 420R	(Italy) Luciano Pavesi											DNS		
1977	Ralt RT1	BMW		SIL	THR	HOC	NÜR	VAL	PAU	MUG	ROU	NOG	PER	MIS	EST	DON
1977	Ralt RT1	BMW	(United States) Eddie Cheever	7	2	Ret	2	3	Ret	17	**1**	5	Ret	2	3	
1977	Ralt RT1	BMW	(Brazil) Ingo Hoffmann	4	Ret	Ret	7	16	8	9	5	3	3	3	NC	Ret
1977	Ralt RT1	BMW	(West Germany) Hans-Joachim Stuck			Ret										
1977	Ralt RT1	BMW	(Switzerland) Clay Regazzoni				Ret									
1978	March 782	BMW		THR	HOC	NÜR	PAU	MUG	VAL	ROU	DON	NOG	PER	MIS	HOC	
1978	March 782	BMW	(United States) Eddie Cheever	4	Ret	3	5	7	Ret	2	Ret	9	2	6	Ret	
1978	March 782	BMW	(Brazil) Ingo Hoffmann	Ret	4	6	Ret	4	Ret	Ret	4	5	Ret	10	14	
1979	March 792	BMW		SIL	HOC	THR	NÜR	VAL	MUG	PAU	HOC	ZAN	PER	MIS	DON	
1979	March 792	BMW	(United Kingdom) Stephen South	5	Ret	Ret	Ret	**Ret**	Ret	8	**1**	Ret	3	8	3	
1979	March 792	BMW	(Republic of Ireland) Derek Daly	2		2			**Ret**	Ret	2	11	2	Ret	**1**	
1979	March 792	BMW	(Finland) Keke Rosberg		1		**Ret**									
1979	March 792	BMW	(Italy) Andrea de Cesaris					6								
1980	March 802	BMW		THR	HOC	NÜR	VAL	PAU	SIL	ZOL	MUG	ZAN	PER	MIS	HOC	
1980	March 802	BMW	(Italy) Andrea de Cesaris	3	**Ret**	Ret	2	Ret	2	Ret	5	Ret	6	1		
1980	March 802	BMW	(Brazil) Chico Serra	4	4	Ret	Ret	Ret	8	Ret	Ret	4	Ret	Ret	Ret	
