= 1971 European Formula Two Championship =

1971 European Formula Two season

Seasons
- ← 1970 1972 →

The 1971 European Formula Two season was contested over 11 rounds. March Engineering driver Ronnie Peterson clinched the championship title.

== Teams and drivers ==
Entrant	Constructor	Chassis	Engine	Driver	Rounds
(United Kingdom) Rondel Racing	Brabham-Ford	BT36	Ford Cosworth FVA 1.6 L4	(United Kingdom) Graham Hill	1–3, 5–6, 9
(United Kingdom) Rondel Racing	Brabham-Ford	BT36	Ford Cosworth FVA 1.6 L4	(Australia) Tim Schenken	1–10
(United Kingdom) Rondel Racing	Brabham-Ford	BT36	Ford Cosworth FVA 1.6 L4	(France) Bob Wollek	4, 6–9
(United Kingdom) Rondel Racing	Brabham-Ford	BT36	Ford Cosworth FVA 1.6 L4	(Sweden) Reine Wisell	7
(United Kingdom) Bob Gerard Racing	Brabham-Ford	BT30	Ford Cosworth FVA 1.6 L4	(United Kingdom) Brian Hart	1–2, 5
(United Kingdom) Alistair Walker Racing	Brabham-Ford	BT30	Ford Cosworth FVA 1.6 L4	(United Kingdom) Alistair Walker	1–3, 5
(Republic of Ireland) Brian Cullen Racing	Brabham-Ford	BT30	Ford Cosworth FVA 1.6 L4	(Republic of Ireland) Brian Cullen	1–2
(United Kingdom) Paul Watson Racing Organisation	Brabham-Ford	BT30	Ford Cosworth FVA 1.6 L4	(United Kingdom) Jeremy Richardson	1–3, 5–6
(Argentina) Automóvil Club Argentino	Brabham-Ford	BT30; BT36	Ford Cosworth FVA 1.6 L4	(Argentina) Carlos Reutemann	All
(Argentina) Automóvil Club Argentino	Brabham-Ford	BT30; BT36	Ford Cosworth FVA 1.6 L4	(Argentina) Carlos Ruesch	All
(United Kingdom) Team Obrist	Brabham-Ford	BT30	Ford Cosworth FVA 1.6 L4	(Switzerland) Jürg Dubler	1–5
(Italy) Scuderia Ala d'Oro (Italy) Ernesto Brambilla	Brabham-Ford	BT30	Ford Cosworth FVA 1.6 L4	(Italy) Ernesto Brambilla	1–3
(Italy) Scuderia Ala d'Oro (Italy) Ernesto Brambilla	Brabham-Ford	BT30	Ford Cosworth FVA 1.6 L4	(Italy) Vittorio Brambilla	1–3
(Italy) Scuderia Ala d'Oro (Italy) Ernesto Brambilla	Brabham-Ford	BT30	Ford Cosworth FVA 1.6 L4	(Italy) Gianluigi Picchi	1, 5
(Italy) Scuderia Ala d'Oro (Italy) Ernesto Brambilla	March-Ford	712M	Ford Cosworth FVA 1.6 L4	(Italy) Giovanni Salvati	5, 8–11
(Italy) Scuderia Ala d'Oro (Italy) Ernesto Brambilla	March-Ford	712M	Ford Cosworth FVA 1.6 L4	(Italy) Ernesto Brambilla	5–6, 8, 10
(Italy) Scuderia Ala d'Oro (Italy) Ernesto Brambilla	March-Ford	712M	Ford Cosworth FVA 1.6 L4	(Italy) Vittorio Brambilla	6, 11
(Italy) Scuderia Ala d'Oro (Italy) Ernesto Brambilla	March-Ford	712M	Ford Cosworth FVA 1.6 L4	(Italy) Claudio Francisci	9
(Italy) Scuderia Ala d'Oro (Italy) Ernesto Brambilla	March-Ford	712M	Ford Cosworth FVA 1.6 L4	(Italy) Giancarlo Gagliardi	10–11
(Italy) Racing Team IRIS Ceramiche	Tecno-Ford	70; 71	Ford Cosworth FVA 1.6 L4	(Italy) Arturo Merzario	1, 4, 6
(Italy) Racing Team IRIS Ceramiche	Tecno-Ford	70; 71	Ford Cosworth FVA 1.6 L4	(Italy) Nanni Galli	1–2, 4, 8
(Italy) Racing Team IRIS Ceramiche	Tecno-Ford	70; 71	Ford Cosworth FVA 1.6 L4	(Italy) Claudio Francisci	6, 8, 10–11
(Italy) Racing Team IRIS Ceramiche	Tecno-Ford	70; 71	Ford Cosworth FVA 1.6 L4	(Italy) Luigi Fontanesi	10
(West Germany) Helmut Gall Autofunk Racing Team	Tecno-Ford	71; 70	Ford Cosworth FVA 1.6 L4	(West Germany) Helmut Gall	1–3, 10
(West Germany) Roland Binder	Tecno-Ford	69	Ford Cosworth FVA 1.6 L4	(West Germany) Roland Binder	1
(Italy) Équipe Tecno Elf	Tecno-Ford	71	Ford Cosworth BDA 1.6 L4	(France) François Cevert	1–10
(Italy) Équipe Tecno Elf	Tecno-Ford	71	Ford Cosworth BDA 1.6 L4	(France) Patrick Depailler	1–3, 5–6, 8–9
(Italy) Équipe Tecno Elf	Tecno-Ford	71	Ford Cosworth BDA 1.6 L4	(France) Jean-Pierre Jabouille	1, 4–6, 9
(Italy) Équipe Tecno Elf	Tecno-Ford	71	Ford Cosworth BDA 1.6 L4	(Italy) Ernesto Brambilla	7
(United Kingdom) LIRA - Team Lotus (United Kingdom) J & J Stanton - Lotus Racing	Lotus-Ford	69; 69C	Ford Cosworth FVA 1.6 L4	(Sweden) Reine Wisell	1–6
(United Kingdom) LIRA - Team Lotus (United Kingdom) J & J Stanton - Lotus Racing	Lotus-Ford	69; 69C	Ford Cosworth FVA 1.6 L4	(United Kingdom) Richard Scott	1–5, 7
(United Kingdom) LIRA - Team Lotus (United Kingdom) J & J Stanton - Lotus Racing	Lotus-Ford	69; 69C	Ford Cosworth FVA 1.6 L4	(United Kingdom) Gerry Birrell	1–2, 4–7, 9–10
(United Kingdom) LIRA - Team Lotus (United Kingdom) J & J Stanton - Lotus Racing	Lotus-Ford	69; 69C	Ford Cosworth FVA 1.6 L4	(France) François Migault	6
(Republic of Ireland) Irish Racing Cars	Lotus-Ford	69	Ford Cosworth FVA 1.6 L4	(United Kingdom) Alan Rollinson	1
(Republic of Ireland) Irish Racing Cars	Brabham-Ford	BT30	Ford Cosworth FVA 1.6 L4	(United Kingdom) Tommy Reid	2
(Republic of Ireland) Irish Racing Cars	Brabham-Ford	BT30	Ford Cosworth FVA 1.6 L4	(Republic of Ireland) Brian Cullen	3
(Japan) Tetsu Ikuzawa	Lotus-Ford	69; 69C	Ford Cosworth FVA 1.6 L4	(Japan) Tetsu Ikuzawa	1–2, 5–9
(United Kingdom) Team Bardahl	Lotus-Ford	69; 69C	Ford Cosworth FVA 1.6 L4	(Brazil) Wilson Fittipaldi	1–4
(United Kingdom) Team Bardahl	Lotus-Ford	69; 69C	Ford Cosworth FVA 1.6 L4	(Brazil) Emerson Fittipaldi	3–5, 9–11
(United Kingdom) Team Bardahl	March-Ford	712M	Ford Cosworth FVA 1.6 L4	(Brazil) Wilson Fittipaldi	5, 7–11
(West Germany) Eifelland Wohnwagenbau	Brabham-Ford	BT30; BT36	Ford Cosworth FVA 1.6 L4	(Austria) Dieter Quester	1
(West Germany) Eifelland Wohnwagenbau	Brabham-Ford	BT30; BT36	Ford Cosworth FVA 1.6 L4	(West Germany) Rolf Stommelen	3, 5, 7
(West Germany) Eifelland Wohnwagenbau	Brabham-Ford	BT30; BT36	Ford Cosworth FVA 1.6 L4	(West Germany) Hans-Joachim Stuck	3
(West Germany) Eifelland Wohnwagenbau	March-Ford	712M; 702	Ford Cosworth FVA 1.6 L4	(West Germany) Hannelore Werner	1, 3–7
(West Germany) Eifelland Wohnwagenbau	March-Ford	712M; 702	Ford Cosworth FVA 1.6 L4	(West Germany) Hermann Unold	1
(West Germany) Eifelland Wohnwagenbau	March-Ford	712M; 702	Ford Cosworth FVA 1.6 L4	(West Germany) Willi Deutsch	3
(West Germany) Eifelland Wohnwagenbau	March-BMW	712M; 702	BMW M11 1.6 L4	(Austria) Dieter Quester	3–11
(Austria) Bosch Racing Team	March-Ford	712M	Ford Cosworth FVA 1.6 L4	(Austria) Niki Lauda	1–10
(United Kingdom) SMOG March Engineering	March-Ford	712M	Ford Cosworth FVA 1.6 L4	(Sweden) Ronnie Peterson	1–10
(United Kingdom) SMOG March Engineering	March-Ford	712M	Ford Cosworth FVA 1.6 L4	(Sweden) Sten Gunnarsson	7
(United Kingdom) SMOG March Engineering	March-Ford	712M	Ford Cosworth FVA 1.6 L4	(France) François Migault	9
(Switzerland) Squadra Tartaruga	March-Ford	712M	Ford Cosworth FVA 1.6 L4	(Switzerland) Xavier Perrot	1–3
(Switzerland) Midland Racing Team	Chevron-Ford	B18	Ford Cosworth FVA 1.6 L4	(Switzerland) Bruno Frey	1
(Switzerland) Midland Racing Team	Chevron-Ford	B18	Ford Cosworth FVA 1.6 L4	(France) Hervé Bayard	6
(Switzerland) Ecurie Bonnier SA (United Kingdom) Lola Cars Ltd	Lola-Ford	T240	Ford Cosworth FVA 1.6 L4	(Austria) Helmut Marko	1, 3–4
(Switzerland) Ecurie Bonnier SA (United Kingdom) Lola Cars Ltd	Lola-Ford	T240	Ford Cosworth FVA 1.6 L4	(Sweden) Jo Bonnier	11
(France) Constructions Mechaniques Pygmée	Pygmée-Ford	MDB16	Ford Cosworth FVA 1.6 L4	(France) Patrick Dal Bo	1–2, 4, 7, 9
(France) Constructions Mechaniques Pygmée	Pygmée-Ford	MDB16	Ford Cosworth FVA 1.6 L4	(France) Jean-Pierre Beltoise	4, 6
(France) Constructions Mechaniques Pygmée	Pygmée-Ford	MDB16	Ford Cosworth FVA 1.6 L4	(Austria) Helmut Marko	7
(France) Constructions Mechaniques Pygmée	Pygmée-Ford	MDB16	Ford Cosworth FVA 1.6 L4	(France) Jimmy Mieusset	9
(United Kingdom) John Watson	Brabham-Ford	BT30	Ford Cosworth FVA 1.6 L4	(United Kingdom) John Watson	1–8, 10
(United Kingdom) Johnny Blades	Lotus-Ford	59B	Ford Cosworth FVA 1.6 L4	(United Kingdom) Johnny Blades	1–3, 5
(United Kingdom) Clarke-Mordaunt Racing with Alistair Guthrie	March-Ford	712M	Ford Cosworth FVA 1.6 L4	(United Kingdom) Mike Beuttler	1–7, 9–11
Écurie Monaco	Brabham-Ford	BT30	Ford Cosworth FVA 1.6 L4	(Monaco) Lionel Noghès	1–2, 4, 6, 9, 11
(Switzerland) Jean Blanc	Tecno-Ford	70; 71	Ford Cosworth FVA 1.6 L4	(Switzerland) Jean Blanc	1–2, 4, 11
(Canada) John Cannon Racing	March-Ford	712M	Ford Cosworth FVA 1.6 L4	(Canada) John Cannon	2–7, 10–11
(United Kingdom) FIRST	Brabham-Ford	BT30; BT36	Ford Cosworth FVA 1.6 L4	(United Kingdom) Peter Westbury	2–3, 5–6, 8–10
(United Kingdom) John Wingfield	Brabham-Ford	BT30	Ford Cosworth FVA 1.6 L4	(United Kingdom) John Wingfield	2–3, 5
(United Kingdom) Rod Pickering	Brabham-Ford	BT23C	Ford Cosworth FVA 1.6 L4	(United Kingdom) Rod Pickering	2
(United Kingdom) Ecurie Ecosse	March-Ford	712M	Ford Cosworth FVA 1.6 L4	(United Kingdom) Tom Walkinshaw	2, 4–5
(United Kingdom) Ecurie Ecosse	March-Ford	712M	Ford Cosworth FVA 1.6 L4	(United Kingdom) Gerry Birrell	3
(United Kingdom) Frank Williams Motul March	March-Ford	712M	Ford Cosworth FVA 1.6 L4	(United Kingdom) Derek Bell	2–3, 5, 7, 9–10
(United Kingdom) Frank Williams Motul March	March-Ford	712M	Ford Cosworth FVA 1.6 L4	(France) Henri Pescarolo	2–3, 5, 8–10
(United Kingdom) Frank Williams Motul March	March-Ford	712M	Ford Cosworth FVA 1.6 L4	(France) Max Jean	6
(United Kingdom) Frank Williams Motul March	March-Ford	712M	Ford Cosworth FVA 1.6 L4	(Brazil) Carlos Pace	6–11
(United Kingdom) Frank Williams Motul March	March-Ford	712M	Ford Cosworth FVA 1.6 L4	(France) Christian Ethuin	6
(United Kingdom) Frank Williams Motul March	Lotus-Ford	59B	Ford Cosworth FVA 1.6 L4	(Brazil) Carlos Pace	5
(France) Shell - Meubles Arnold Team	March-Ford	712M	Ford Cosworth FVA 1.6 L4	(France) Jean-Pierre Jaussaud	2–10
(France) Shell - Meubles Arnold Team	March-Ford	712M	Ford Cosworth FVA 1.6 L4	(France) Jean-Pierre Jarier	2, 4–7, 9–11
(France) Shell - Meubles Arnold Team	March-Ford	712M	Ford Cosworth FVA 1.6 L4	(Switzerland) Clay Regazzoni	11
(Switzerland) Jo Siffert - Chevron Racing Team	Chevron-Ford	B18; B18C	Ford Cosworth FVA 1.6 L4	(Switzerland) Jo Siffert	2–3, 5
(Switzerland) Jo Siffert - Chevron Racing Team	Chevron-Ford	B18; B18C	Ford Cosworth FVA 1.6 L4	(France) François Mazet	4, 6, 9–10
(Switzerland) Jo Siffert - Chevron Racing Team	Chevron-Ford	B18; B18C	Ford Cosworth FVA 1.6 L4	(United Kingdom) Chris Craft	5, 7
(Switzerland) Jo Siffert - Chevron Racing Team	Chevron-Ford	B18; B18C	Ford Cosworth FVA 1.6 L4	(France) José Dolhem	11
(United Kingdom) Crosslé Racing Team	Crosslé-Ford	18F	Ford Cosworth FVA 1.6 L4	(United Kingdom) Brian Nelson	2
(West Germany) Bernd Terbeck	Brabham-Ford	BT36	Ford Cosworth FVA 1.6 L4	(West Germany) Bernd Terbeck	3, 5, 7
Scuderia Jolly Club Switzerland - Marlboro Racing; Silvio Moser Racing Team SA	Brabham-Ford	BT30	Ford Cosworth FVA 1.6 L4	(Switzerland) Silvio Moser	4–6, 9–11
Scuderia Jolly Club Switzerland - Marlboro Racing; Silvio Moser Racing Team SA	Brabham-Ford	BT30	Ford Cosworth FVA 1.6 L4	(Switzerland) Jürg Dubler	6–7
Scuderia Jolly Club Switzerland - Marlboro Racing; Silvio Moser Racing Team SA	March-Ford	712M	Ford Cosworth FVA 1.6 L4	(Switzerland) Fredy Link	5, 7, 10–11
(France) GTE Racing Cars	Lotus-Ford	69	Ford Cosworth FVA 1.6 L4	(France) Adam Potocki	4–6, 9–10
(France) GTE Racing Cars	Lotus-Ford	69	Ford Cosworth FVA 1.6 L4	(France) Jean-Pierre Beltoise	9
(United Kingdom) Nick May	Chevron-Ford	B17B	Ford Cosworth FVA 1.6 L4	(United Kingdom) Nick May	5
(France) Hervé Bayard	Chevron-Ford	B18	Ford Cosworth FVA 1.6 L4	(France) Hervé Bayard	5
(Switzerland) ACA Racing Club	McLaren-Ford	M4A	Ford Cosworth FVA 1.6 L4	(Switzerland) Georges Schäfer	5
(West Germany) Keiper Recaro Racing Team	Maco-Ford	271	Ford Cosworth FVA 1.6 L4	(West Germany) Ernst Maring	7

== Calendar ==
Race No	Circuit	Date	Laps	Distance	Time	Speed	Pole position	Fastest lap	Winner
1	(West Germany) Hockenheim	4 April	20+20	6.789=271.56 km	1'27:09.8	186.931 km/h	(Sweden) Ronnie Peterson	(Sweden) Ronnie Peterson	(France) François Cevert
2	(United Kingdom) Thruxton	12 April	50	3.791=189.55 km	1'02:36.2; 1'02:36.8	181.668 km/h 181.639 km/h	(Sweden) Ronnie Peterson	(Sweden) Ronnie Peterson	(United Kingdom) Graham Hill (Sweden) Ronnie Peterson
3	(West Germany) Nürburgring (Eifelrennen)	2 May	10	22.835=228.35 km	1'20:19.2	170.580 km/h	(United Kingdom) Derek Bell	(Sweden) Ronnie Peterson	(France) François Cevert
4	(Spain) Jarama	16 May	60	3.404=204.24 km	1'29:42.9; 1'29:57.7	136.593 km/h 136.218 km/h	(Sweden) Ronnie Peterson	(Australia) Tim Schenken	(Brazil) Emerson Fittipaldi (Austria) Dieter Quester
5	(United Kingdom) Crystal Palace	31 May	50	2.238=111.85 km	0'42:03.0; 0'42:07.4	159.590 km/h 159.312 km/h	(Sweden) Ronnie Peterson	(France) Jean-Pierre Jaussaud (Australia) Tim Schenken (Sweden) Ronnie Peterson (Brazil) Emerson Fittipaldi	(Brazil) Emerson Fittipaldi (Australia) Tim Schenken
6	(France) Rouen	27 June	25	6.541=163.525 km	0'55:36.3	176.450 km/h	(Sweden) Ronnie Peterson	(France) François Cevert	(Sweden) Ronnie Peterson
7	(Sweden) Mantorp Park	8 August	36+36	4.092=294.624 km	1'46:08.2	166.554 km/h	(Sweden) Ronnie Peterson	(Sweden) Ronnie Peterson	(Sweden) Ronnie Peterson
	(Italy) Pergusa-Enna	22 August	cancelled						
8	(Austria) Tulln-Langenlebarn	12 September	35+35	2.86=200.2 km	1'24:32.26	142.091 km/h	(Sweden) Ronnie Peterson	(Australia) Tim Schenken	(Sweden) Ronnie Peterson
9	(France) Albi	26 September	63	3.636=229.068 km	1'16:49.1; 1'17:49,6	178.917 km/h 176.599 km/h	(Argentina) Carlos Reutemann	(Argentina) Carlos Reutemann	(Brazil) Emerson Fittipaldi (Argentina) Carlos Reutemann
10	(Italy) Vallelunga	10 October	35+35	3.2=224.0 km	1'25:57.2	156.364 km/h	(Brazil) Emerson Fittipaldi	(Brazil) Emerson Fittipaldi	(Sweden) Ronnie Peterson
11	(Italy) Vallelunga	17 October	65	3.2=208.0 km	1'19:49.1	156.355 km/h	(Brazil) Emerson Fittipaldi	(United Kingdom) Mike Beuttler (Austria) Dieter Quester	(United Kingdom) Mike Beuttler

Notes:

- Races 1, 7, 8 and 10 were held in two heats, with results shown in aggregate.
- Races 2, 5 and 6 were held with two semi-final heats and the final run, with time only shown for the final.
- Races 2, 4, 5 and 9 was won by a graded driver, all graded drivers are shown in italics.

== Final point standings ==
=== Drivers ===
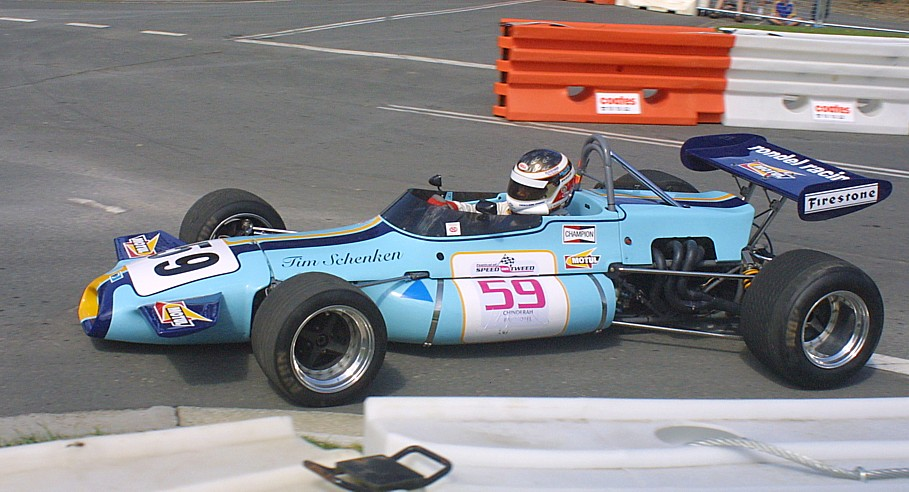
Tim Schenken's Brabham BT36

For every race, points were awarded: 9 points to the winner, 6 for runner-up, 4 for third place, 3 for fourth place, 2 for fifth place, and 1 for sixth place. No additional points were awarded. The best 8 results counted. No driver had a point deduction.

Place	Name	Team	Chassis	Engine	HOC (West Germany)	THR (United Kingdom)	NÜR (West Germany)	JAR (Spain)	CRY (United Kingdom)	ROU (France)	MAN (Sweden)	TUL (Austria)	ALB (France)	VLL1 (Italy)	VLL2 (Italy)	Points
1	(Sweden) Ronnie Peterson	March Engineering	March	Ford	-	9	-	-	6	9	9	9	3	9	-	54
2	(Argentina) Carlos Reutemann	Automovil Club Argentino	Brabham	Ford	6	-	6	6	3	2	4	-	9	4	-	40
3	(Austria) Dieter Quester	Eifelland	March	BMW	-	-	-	9	-	6	-	4	-	6	6	31
4	(Australia) Tim Schenken	Rondel Racing	Brabham	Ford	3	3	-	-	9	-	6	6	-	-	-	27
5	(France) François Cevert	Équipe Tecno	Tecno	Ford	9	4	9	-	-	-	-	-	-	-	-	22
6	(Brazil) Wilson Fittipaldi	Team Bardahl	Lotus	Ford	4	2	2	2	-	-	3	3	-	-	-	16
7	(United Kingdom) Mike Beuttler	Team Clarke-Mordaunt	March	Ford	-	-	-	-	-	-	-	-	-	3	9	12
8	(France) Jean-Pierre Jarier	Team Arnold	March	Ford	-	-	-	-	-	-	-	-	6	-	4	10
9	(France) Jean-Pierre Jaussaud	Team Arnold	March	Ford	-	-	-	3	4	-	-	-	2	-	-	9
10	(Austria) Niki Lauda	Bosch Racing	March	Ford	-	-	3	1	-	4	-	-	-	-	-	8
11	(France) François Migault	Team Lotus	Lotus	Ford	-	-	-	-	-	3	-	-				7
11	(France) François Migault	March Engineering	March	Ford									4	-	-	7
	(United Kingdom) Gerry Birrell	Team J. & J. Stanton	Lotus	Ford	2	-	-	-	2	-	1	-	-	2	-	7
13	(United Kingdom) Derek Bell	Williams Racing	March	Ford	-	6	-	-	-	-	-	-	-	-	-	6
14	(United Kingdom) Peter Westbury	FIRST	Brabham	Ford	-	-	4	-	-	-	-	-	1	-	-	5
	(United Kingdom) John Watson	private entry	Brabham	Ford	-	-	-	-	-	-	2	2	-	1	-	5
16	(Canada) John Cannon	private entry	March	Ford	-	-	-	4	-	-	-	-	-	-	-	4
17	(Argentina) Carlos Ruesch	Automovil Club Argentino	Brabham	Ford	-	-	-	-	-	-	-	-	-	-	3	3
18	(Italy) Vittorio Brambilla	private entry	March	Ford	-	-	-	-	-	-	-	-	-	-	2	2
	(Switzerland) Silvio Moser	Moser Racing	Brabham	Ford	-	-	-	-	1	-	-	-	-	-	1	2
20	(United Kingdom) Brian Hart	Gerard Racing	Brabham	Ford	1	-	-	-	-	-	-	-	-	-	-	1
	(United Kingdom) Alistair Walker	Walker Racing	Brabham	Ford	-	1	-	-	-	-	-	-	-	-	-	1
	(Austria) Helmut Marko	Écurie Bonnier	Lola	Ford	-	-	1	-	-	-	-	-	-	-	-	1
	(France) François Mazet	Siffert Racing	Chevron	Ford	-	-	-	-	-	1	-	-	-	-	-	1
	(France) Bob Wollek	Rondel Racing	Brabham	Ford	-	-	-	-	-	-	-	1	-	-	-	1

Note:

Only drivers which were not graded were able to score points.

== Non-championship race results ==
Other Formula Two races, which did not count towards the European Championship, also held in 1971.

Race name	Circuit	Date	Winning driver	Constructor
I Gran Premio República de Colombia	Bogotá	7 February	(Switzerland) Jo Siffert	(United Kingdom) Chevron-Ford
(Colombia) I Gran Premio Ciudad de Bogotá	Bogotá	14 February	(United Kingdom) Alan Rollinson	(United Kingdom) Brabham-Ford
(United Kingdom) I Speed International Trophy	Mallory Park	14 March	(France) Henri Pescarolo	(United Kingdom) March-Ford
(France) XXXI Grand Prix Automobile de Pau	Pau	25 April	(Sweden) Reine Wisell	(United Kingdom) Lotus-Ford
(Italy) I Gran Premio Madunina	Vallelunga	13 June	(France) François Cevert	(Italy) Tecno-Ford
(Italy) XIII Gran Premio della Lotteria di Monza	Monza	20 June	(Austria) Dieter Quester	(United Kingdom) March-Ford
(Republic of Ireland) XXIX Leinster Trophy	Mondello Park	11 July	(United Kingdom) John Watson	(United Kingdom) Brabham-Ford
(Italy) X Gran Premio Città di Imola	Imola	25 July	(Brazil) Carlos Pace	(United Kingdom) March-Ford
(Sweden) I Swedish Gold Cup	Kinnekulle Ring	22 August	(Sweden) Ronnie Peterson	(United Kingdom) March-Ford
(United Kingdom) I Rothmans International Trophy	Brands Hatch	30 August	(Sweden) Ronnie Peterson	(United Kingdom) March-Ford
(West Germany) IV Preis von Baden-Württemberg und Hessen	Hockenheimring	3 October	(Argentina) Carlos Reutemann	(United Kingdom) Brabham-Ford
