= 1972 European Formula Two Championship =

1972 European Formula Two season

Seasons
- ← 1971 1973 →

The 1972 European Formula Two Championship season was contested over 14 rounds mostly on circuits that were not among the European heats of the 1972 Formula One season, with only Österreichring being visited by both series. Several current F1 drivers took part, without collecting points towards the F2 Championship, namely Emerson Fittipaldi who won three F2 races just before also securing his first F1 World Championship.

British Mike Hailwood, a nine-time Grand Prix motorcycle World Champion in the 1960s, was the season champion, driving a Surtees-Ford.

== Teams and drivers ==
Entrant	Constructor	Chassis	Engine	Tyre	Driver	Rounds
(United Kingdom) STP March Engineering	March-Ford	722	Ford Cosworth BDA 2.0 L4; Ford Cosworth BDF 2.0 L4	G	(Sweden) Ronnie Peterson	1-2, 6, 10, 12, 14
(United Kingdom) STP March Engineering	March-Ford	722	Ford Cosworth BDA 2.0 L4; Ford Cosworth BDF 2.0 L4	G	(Austria) Niki Lauda	1-10, 12, 14
(United Kingdom) STP March Engineering	March-Ford	722	Ford Cosworth BDA 2.0 L4; Ford Cosworth BDF 2.0 L4	G	(West Germany) Jochen Mass	3-5, 7
(United Kingdom) Elf Coombs Racing (United Kingdom) John Coombs Racing (United Kingdom) Gomm Metal Developments	March-Ford	722	Ford Cosworth BDA 2.0 L4; Ford Cosworth BDF 2.0 L4	G	(France) Jean-Pierre Jabouille	1, 9-11
(United Kingdom) Elf Coombs Racing (United Kingdom) John Coombs Racing (United Kingdom) Gomm Metal Developments	March-Ford	722	Ford Cosworth BDA 2.0 L4; Ford Cosworth BDF 2.0 L4	G	(United Kingdom) Adrian Wilkins	1-10, 13-14
(United Kingdom) Elf Coombs Racing (United Kingdom) John Coombs Racing (United Kingdom) Gomm Metal Developments	March-Ford	722	Ford Cosworth BDA 2.0 L4; Ford Cosworth BDF 2.0 L4	G	(France) François Cevert	2-5, 7
(United Kingdom) Elf Coombs Racing (United Kingdom) John Coombs Racing (United Kingdom) Gomm Metal Developments	March-Ford	722	Ford Cosworth BDA 2.0 L4; Ford Cosworth BDF 2.0 L4	G	(France) Patrick Depailler	4-5, 7-10, 12-14
(United Kingdom) Elf Coombs Racing (United Kingdom) John Coombs Racing (United Kingdom) Gomm Metal Developments	Elf-Ford	2	Ford Cosworth BDA 2.0 L4	G	(France) Patrick Depailler	3, 6, 11
(United Kingdom) Elf Coombs Racing (United Kingdom) John Coombs Racing (United Kingdom) Gomm Metal Developments	Elf-Ford	2	Ford Cosworth BDA 2.0 L4	G	(France) Jean-Pierre Jabouille	4, 7-8, 12-14
(United Kingdom) Clarke-Mordaunt-Guthrie Racing	March-Ford	722	Ford Cosworth BDA 2.0 L4	G	(United Kingdom) Mike Beuttler	1-8, 10-12
(United Kingdom) LEC Refrigeration Racing	March-Ford	722	Ford Cosworth BDA 2.0 L4	G	(United Kingdom) David Purley	1-10, 13
(Switzerland) Squadra Tartaruga	March-Ford	722	Ford Cosworth BDE 1.8 L4; Ford Cosworth BDA 2.0 L4	G	(Switzerland) Xavier Perrot	1, 3, 6, 14
(United Kingdom) Peter Bloore Racing (United Kingdom) Space Racing	March-Ford	722	Ford Cosworth BDA 2.0 L4; Ford Cosworth BDE 1.8 L4	G	(United States) Brett Lunger	1-3, 5-10, 14
(United Kingdom) Peter Bloore Racing (United Kingdom) Space Racing	March-Ford	722	Ford Cosworth BDA 2.0 L4; Ford Cosworth BDE 1.8 L4	G	(Japan) Hiroshi Kazato	1-12
(United Kingdom) Motul Rondel Racing	Brabham-Ford	BT38	Ford Cosworth BDF 2.0 L4; Ford Cosworth BDA 2.0 L4; Ford Cosworth BDE 1.8 L4	G	(Argentina) Carlos Reutemann	1-2, 5-12, 14
(United Kingdom) Motul Rondel Racing	Brabham-Ford	BT38	Ford Cosworth BDF 2.0 L4; Ford Cosworth BDA 2.0 L4; Ford Cosworth BDE 1.8 L4	G	(France) Bob Wollek	1, 3-10, 12-14
(United Kingdom) Motul Rondel Racing	Brabham-Ford	BT38	Ford Cosworth BDF 2.0 L4; Ford Cosworth BDA 2.0 L4; Ford Cosworth BDE 1.8 L4	G	(France) Henri Pescarolo	2-5, 7, 11, 14
(United Kingdom) Motul Rondel Racing	Brabham-Ford	BT38	Ford Cosworth BDF 2.0 L4; Ford Cosworth BDA 2.0 L4; Ford Cosworth BDE 1.8 L4	G	(Australia) Tim Schenken	2, 6, 10, 14
(United Kingdom) Motul Rondel Racing	Brabham-Ford	BT38	Ford Cosworth BDF 2.0 L4; Ford Cosworth BDA 2.0 L4; Ford Cosworth BDE 1.8 L4	G	(France) Max Jean	4, 13
(United Kingdom) Motul Rondel Racing	Brabham-Ford	BT38	Ford Cosworth BDF 2.0 L4; Ford Cosworth BDA 2.0 L4; Ford Cosworth BDE 1.8 L4	G	(France) Jean-Pierre Beltoise	5, 7
(United Kingdom) Motul Rondel Racing	Brabham-Ford	BT38	Ford Cosworth BDF 2.0 L4; Ford Cosworth BDA 2.0 L4; Ford Cosworth BDE 1.8 L4	G	(Sweden) Reine Wisell	10
(United Kingdom) Motul Rondel Racing	Brabham-Ford	BT38	Ford Cosworth BDF 2.0 L4; Ford Cosworth BDA 2.0 L4; Ford Cosworth BDE 1.8 L4	G	(United Kingdom) Gerry Birrell	13
(United Kingdom) FIRST	Brabham-Ford	BT36; BT38	Ford Cosworth BDA 2.0 L4	?	(United Kingdom) Peter Westbury	1-2, 4-5, 7, 9, 13-14
(United Kingdom) Uniacke Chemicals (United Kingdom) Richard Scott	Brabham-Ford	BT36; BT38	Ford Cosworth BDA 2.0 L4; Ford Cosworth BDE 1.8 L4	G	(United Kingdom) Richard Scott	1-10, 13-14
(Denmark) Team Viking	Brabham-Ford	BT28; BT38	Ford Cosworth BDA 2.0 L4	?	(Denmark) Tom Belsø	1-7, 10, 13-14
(United Kingdom) Team Bardahl	March-Ford	712M	Ford Cosworth BDE 1.8 L4	G	(Brazil) Wilson Fittipaldi	1
(United Kingdom) Team Bardahl	Brabham-Ford	BT38	Ford Cosworth BDE 1.8 L4; Ford Cosworth BDA 2.0 L4	G	(Brazil) Wilson Fittipaldi	2-9, 11-12, 14
(United Kingdom) Nicoby Racing (United Kingdom) John Wingfield	Brabham-Ford	BT36	Ford Cosworth BDA 2.0 L4	?	(United Kingdom) John Wingfield	1-5, 9, 13-14
(United Kingdom) Edward Reeves Racing	Brabham-Ford	BT35; BT38	Ford Cosworth BDA 2.0 L4	F	(United Kingdom) Dave Morgan	1-2, 4-9, 12
(United Kingdom) Richard Barker	Brabham-Ford	BT28	Ford Cosworth BDA 1.6 L4	?	(United Kingdom) Dick Barker	1, 5
(United Kingdom) Matchbox Team Surtees (United Kingdom) FINA Team Surtees	Surtees-Ford	TS10	Ford Cosworth BDA 2.0 L4; Ford Cosworth BDE 1.8 L4	F	(United Kingdom) Mike Hailwood	All
(United Kingdom) Matchbox Team Surtees (United Kingdom) FINA Team Surtees	Surtees-Ford	TS10	Ford Cosworth BDA 2.0 L4; Ford Cosworth BDE 1.8 L4	F	(United Kingdom) John Surtees	2, 5, 7, 9
(United Kingdom) Matchbox Team Surtees (United Kingdom) FINA Team Surtees	Surtees-Ford	TS10	Ford Cosworth BDA 2.0 L4; Ford Cosworth BDE 1.8 L4	F	(Argentina) Carlos Ruesch	3-14
(United Kingdom) Matchbox Team Surtees (United Kingdom) FINA Team Surtees	Surtees-Ford	TS10	Ford Cosworth BDA 2.0 L4; Ford Cosworth BDE 1.8 L4	F	(Italy) Andrea de Adamich	4-5, 8-9, 11, 14
(United Kingdom) Matchbox Team Surtees (United Kingdom) FINA Team Surtees	Surtees-Ford	TS10	Ford Cosworth BDA 2.0 L4; Ford Cosworth BDE 1.8 L4	F	(Austria) Dieter Quester	8
(United Kingdom) Matchbox Team Surtees (United Kingdom) FINA Team Surtees	Surtees-Ford	TS10	Ford Cosworth BDA 2.0 L4; Ford Cosworth BDE 1.8 L4	F	(Brazil) Carlos Pace	11-12
(United Kingdom) Matchbox Team Surtees (United Kingdom) FINA Team Surtees	Surtees-Ford	TS10	Ford Cosworth BDA 2.0 L4; Ford Cosworth BDE 1.8 L4	F	(France) José Dolhem	13
(United Kingdom) GRS International (United Kingdom) Elmo International	GRD-Ford	272	Ford Cosworth FVA 1.6 L4; Ford Cosworth BDE 1.8 L4; Ford Cosworth BDA 2.0 L4	F	(Japan) Tetsu Ikuzawa	1, 3-4, 6-7, 9-10, 13-14
(United Kingdom) GRS International (United Kingdom) Elmo International	GRD-Ford	272	Ford Cosworth FVA 1.6 L4; Ford Cosworth BDE 1.8 L4; Ford Cosworth BDA 2.0 L4	F	(Switzerland) Roland Saloman	3
(United Kingdom) GRS International (United Kingdom) Elmo International	GRD-Ford	272	Ford Cosworth FVA 1.6 L4; Ford Cosworth BDE 1.8 L4; Ford Cosworth BDA 2.0 L4	F	(Sweden) Reine Wisell	4
(United Kingdom) GRS International (United Kingdom) Elmo International	GRD-Ford	272	Ford Cosworth FVA 1.6 L4; Ford Cosworth BDE 1.8 L4; Ford Cosworth BDA 2.0 L4	F	(United Kingdom) Tom Walkinshaw	5, 7
(United Kingdom) GRS International (United Kingdom) Elmo International	GRD-Ford	272	Ford Cosworth FVA 1.6 L4; Ford Cosworth BDE 1.8 L4; Ford Cosworth BDA 2.0 L4	F	(Belgium) Claude Bourgoignie	5, 7
(United Kingdom) GRS International (United Kingdom) Elmo International	GRD-Ford	272	Ford Cosworth FVA 1.6 L4; Ford Cosworth BDE 1.8 L4; Ford Cosworth BDA 2.0 L4	F	(Japan) Hiroshi Kazato	14
(United Kingdom) GRS International (United Kingdom) Elmo International	March-Ford	722	Ford Cosworth BDA 2.0 L4	G	(Japan) Hiroshi Kazato	13
(United Kingdom) Bruce McLaren Motor Racing Ltd (United Kingdom) Impact Group	McLaren-Ford	M21	Ford Cosworth BDF 2.0 L4; Ford Cosworth BDE 1.8 L4	G	(South Africa) Jody Scheckter	1-2, 4-10, 13
(United Kingdom) Team Ensign	Ensign-Ford	LNF2	Ford Cosworth BDA 2.0 L4	F	(United Kingdom) John Burton	1-2
(United Kingdom) Chevron Racing Team	Chevron-Ford	B20	Ford Cosworth BDA 2.0 L4	F	(United Kingdom) Peter Gethin	1-2, 4, 6-10, 12, 14
(United Kingdom) Chevron Racing Team	Chevron-Ford	B20	Ford Cosworth BDA 2.0 L4	F	(United Kingdom) Vic Elford	5
(United Kingdom) Alida - Graham Eden Racing	Chevron-Ford	B18	Ford Cosworth BDA 2.0 L4	?	(United Kingdom) Cyd Williams	1
(United Kingdom) Tate of Leeds Racing (United Kingdom) Jägermeister Racing Team	Brabham-Ford	BT36; BT38	Ford Cosworth BDA 2.0 L4	?	(United Kingdom) Graham Hill	2-5, 7, 9, 12, 14
(Italy) Elcom Racing Team	Brabham-Ford	BT38	Ford Cosworth BDE 1.8 L4	?	(Italy) Claudio Francisci	2-4, 7-9, 11-14
(France) Écurie ASCA	Brabham-Ford	BT38	Ford Cosworth BDA 2.0 L4	F	(France) Jean-Pierre Jaussaud	2-14
(France) Écurie ASCA	Brabham-Ford	BT38	Ford Cosworth BDA 2.0 L4	F	(France) Adam Potocki	3-7, 9-11, 13-14
(United Kingdom) Sports Motors (Manchester) (United Kingdom) Sports Motors Coca Cola Bottlers Manchester	March-Ford	722	Ford Cosworth BDA 2.0 L4	G	(United Kingdom) Gerry Birrell	2, 4-5, 10
(France) Shell - Meubles Arnold Team	March-Ford	722	Ford Cosworth BDE 1.8 L4; Ford Cosworth BDA 2.0 L4	?	(France) Jean-Pierre Jarier	2-3
(France) Shell - Meubles Arnold Team	March-Ford	722	Ford Cosworth BDE 1.8 L4; Ford Cosworth BDA 2.0 L4	?	(France) Jean-Pierre Beltoise	4
(France) Shell - Meubles Arnold Team	March-Ford	722	Ford Cosworth BDE 1.8 L4; Ford Cosworth BDA 2.0 L4	?	(France) José Dolhem	5-12, 14
(United Kingdom) Banting & Earle Racing Team (Brazil) Brazilian Racing Team (France) Pygmée Racing Team	Pygmée-Ford	MDB17	Ford Cosworth BDA 2.0 L4	?	(Brazil) Carlos Pace	2-4, 8
(United Kingdom) Banting & Earle Racing Team (Brazil) Brazilian Racing Team (France) Pygmée Racing Team	Pygmée-Ford	MDB17	Ford Cosworth BDA 2.0 L4	?	(France) Patrick Dal Bo	2-4, 6-11, 13-14
(United Kingdom) Banting & Earle Racing Team (Brazil) Brazilian Racing Team (France) Pygmée Racing Team	Pygmée-Ford	MDB17	Ford Cosworth BDA 2.0 L4	?	(Brazil) Lian Duarté	2-4, 7-9
(United Kingdom) Banting & Earle Racing Team (Brazil) Brazilian Racing Team (France) Pygmée Racing Team	Pygmée-Ford	MDB17	Ford Cosworth BDA 2.0 L4	?	(France) Jean-Louis Lafosse	13
(United Kingdom) Leda Engineering (United Kingdom) Allan McCall Team Tui	Leda-Tui-Ford	AM29; BH2	Ford Cosworth BDA 2.0 L4	G F	(New Zealand) Bert Hawthorne	2-3
(United Kingdom) Leda Engineering (United Kingdom) Allan McCall Team Tui	Leda-Tui-Ford	AM29; BH2	Ford Cosworth BDA 2.0 L4	G F	(United Kingdom) John Watson	5-10
(United Kingdom) Leda Engineering (United Kingdom) Allan McCall Team Tui	Leda-Tui-Ford	AM29; BH2	Ford Cosworth BDA 2.0 L4	G F	(United Kingdom) Dave Morgan	13-14
(West Germany) Bernd Terbeck	Brabham-Ford	BT36	Ford Cosworth BDA 2.0 L4	?	(West Germany) Bernd Terbeck	3
(Italy) Beta Utensili Racing	March-Ferrari	712M	Ferrari Dino 206 2.0 V6	?	(Italy) Ernesto Brambilla	3
(Italy) Beta Utensili Racing	March-Ford	712M	Ford Cosworth BDE 1.8 L4	?	(Italy) Ernesto Brambilla	8-9, 12, 14
(Italy) Beta Utensili Racing	March-Ford	712M	Ford Cosworth BDE 1.8 L4	?	(Italy) Vittorio Brambilla	8-9
Scuderia Jolly Club Switzerland; Silvio Moser Racing Team SA (Italy) Scuderia del Lario	March-Ford	712M	Ford Cosworth FVA 1.6 L4; Ford Cosworth BDE 1.8 L4	?	(Switzerland) Peter Korda	3, 14
Scuderia Jolly Club Switzerland; Silvio Moser Racing Team SA (Italy) Scuderia del Lario	Brabham-Ford	BT38	Ford Cosworth BDA 2.0 L4; Ford Cosworth BDE 1.8 L4	?	(Switzerland) Silvio Moser	4-6, 8-9, 11, 13-14
Scuderia Jolly Club Switzerland; Silvio Moser Racing Team SA (Italy) Scuderia del Lario	Brabham-Ford	BT38	Ford Cosworth BDA 2.0 L4; Ford Cosworth BDE 1.8 L4	?	(Italy) Giancarlo Gagliardi	5-7
(West Germany) Roland Binder	Brabham-Ford	BT36	Ford Cosworth BDA 2.0 L4; Ford Cosworth BDE 1.8 L4	?	(West Germany) Roland Binder	3, 5-6, 12, 14
(United Kingdom) Moonraker Power Yachts (United Kingdom) Texaco Team Lotus	Lotus-Ford	69	Ford Cosworth BDF 2.0 L4; Ford Cosworth BDA 2.0 L4	F	(Brazil) Emerson Fittipaldi	4, 6-8, 14
(United Kingdom) Tom Wheatcroft Racing	March-Ford	722	Ford Cosworth BDA 2.0 L4	?	(United Kingdom) Roger Williamson	4, 7-8
(Switzerland) Fred Stalder	Pygmée-Ford	MDB17	Ford Cosworth FVA 1.6 L4	?	(Switzerland) Fred Stalder	4, 6-7, 9
(West Germany) Eifelland Wohnwagenbau	Eifelland-Ford	22	Ford Cosworth BDA 2.0 L4	?	(West Germany) Hannelore Werner	6
(West Germany) Eifelland Wohnwagenbau	Eifelland-Ford	22	Ford Cosworth BDA 2.0 L4	?	(West Germany) Werner Schommers	6
(Switzerland) Peter Korda	March-Ford	712M	Ford Cosworth FVA 1.6 L4	?	(Switzerland) Peter Korda	6
(United Kingdom) Frank Williams Racing Cars	Brabham-Ford	BT38	Ford Cosworth BDE 1.8 L4	?	(Italy) Giancarlo Gagliardi	9
(Switzerland) Georges Schäfer (Switzerland) ACA Racing	Chevron-Ford	B18	Ford Cosworth BDA 2.0 L4; Ford Cosworth BDE 1.8 L4	?	(Switzerland) Georges Schäfer	11, 14
(United Kingdom) Hesketh Racing	March-Ford	712M	Ford Cosworth BDA 2.0 L4	?	(United Kingdom) James Hunt	12-14
Malaysia-Singapore Airlines	March-Ford	722	Ford Cosworth BDA 2.0 L4	?	(Australia) Vern Schuppan	14
(Belgium) Claude Bourgoignie	GRD-Ford	272	Ford Cosworth BDA 2.0 L4	?	(Belgium) Claude Bourgoignie	14
(West Germany) Werner Christmann	March-Ford	722	Ford Cosworth BDA 2.0 L4	?	(West Germany) Werner Christmann	14

== Calendar ==
Race No	Circuit	Date	Laps	Distance	Time	Speed	Pole position	Fastest lap	Winner
1	(United Kingdom) Mallory Park	12 March	50+50	2.17=217.0 km	1'14:32.8	174.656 km/h	(Sweden) Ronnie Peterson (United Kingdom) Dave Morgan	(Sweden) Ronnie Peterson	(United Kingdom) Dave Morgan
2	(United Kingdom) Thruxton	3 April	50	3.791=189.55 km	1'00:19.4; 1 lap down	188.534 km/h -	(Sweden) Ronnie Peterson (United Kingdom) Mike Hailwood	(Sweden) Ronnie Peterson	(Sweden) Ronnie Peterson (Austria) Niki Lauda
3	(West Germany) Hockenheim	16 April	20+20	6.789=271.56 km	1'25:24.2	190.784 km/h	(France) Jean-Pierre Jaussaud (France) Patrick Depailler	(France) Jean-Pierre Jaussaud	(Austria) Niki Lauda
4	(France) Pau	7 May	70	2.76=193.2 km	1'33:40.8	123.740 km/h	(France) François Cevert	(France) Jean-Pierre Jaussaud	(United Kingdom) Peter Gethin
5	(United Kingdom) Crystal Palace	29 May	50	2.238=111.85 km	0'41:32.4	161.555 km/h	(United Kingdom) Mike Hailwood	(France) François Cevert (South Africa) Jody Scheckter	(South Africa) Jody Scheckter
6	(West Germany) Hockenheim	11 June	15+15	6.789=203.67 km	1'13:39.2; 1'15:05,6	165.915 km/h 162.733 km/h	(Austria) Niki Lauda	(Brazil) Emerson Fittipaldi	(Brazil) Emerson Fittipaldi (France) Jean-Pierre Jaussaud
7	(France) Rouen	25 June	30	5.543=166.29 km	0'54:20.0; 0'54:28.0	183.633 km/h 183.184 km/h	(Brazil) Emerson Fittipaldi	(United Kingdom) Mike Hailwood	(Brazil) Emerson Fittipaldi (United Kingdom) Mike Hailwood
8	(Austria) Österreichring	9 July	34	5.911=200.974 km	0'59:23.51; 0'59:39.52	203.032 km/h 202.124 km/h	(Brazil) Emerson Fittipaldi (United Kingdom) Mike Hailwood	(Brazil) Emerson Fittipaldi	(Brazil) Emerson Fittipaldi (United Kingdom) Mike Hailwood
9	(Italy) Imola	23 July	28+28	5.018=281.008 km	1'28:08.2; 1'28:16.7	191.299 km/h 190.299 km/h	(France) Jean-Pierre Jaussaud	(United Kingdom) Peter Gethin	(United Kingdom) John Surtees (France) Bob Wollek
10	(Sweden) Mantorp Park	6 August	36+36	4.092=294.624 km	1'45:50.0	167.031 km/h	(United Kingdom) Peter Gethin	(United Kingdom) Peter Gethin	(United Kingdom) Mike Hailwood
11	(Italy) Pergusa-Enna	20 August	32+32	4.797=307.008 km	1'33:22.8; 1'33:46.2	197.264 km/h 196.443 km/h	(United Kingdom) Mike Hailwood	(Brazil) Carlos Pace	(France) Henri Pescarolo (France) Patrick Depailler
12	(Austria) Salzburgring	3 September	30+30	4.238=254.28 km	1'13:31.76	207.493 km/h	(Brazil) Carlos Pace	(United Kingdom) Mike Hailwood	(United Kingdom) Mike Hailwood
13	(France) Albi	24 September	32	3.636=116.352 km	0'37:53.5	184.239 km/h	(United Kingdom) Dave Morgan	(France) Patrick Depailler	(France) Jean-Pierre Jaussaud
14	(West Germany) Hockenheim	1 October	32	6.789=217.248 km	1'07:22.7; 1'07:40,6	193.458 km/h 192.605 km/h	(Brazil) Emerson Fittipaldi (United Kingdom) Mike Hailwood	(Brazil) Emerson Fittipaldi	(Australia) Tim Schenken (United Kingdom) Mike Hailwood
	(Italy) Vallelunga	15 October	cancelled						

Note:

Race 1, 3, 6, 9, 10, 11 and 12 were held in two heats, with results shown in aggregate.

Race 2, 4, 5, 7 and 13 were held with two semi-final heats and the final run, with time only shown for the final.

Race 2, 6, 7, 9, 11 and 14 was won by a graded driver, all graded drivers are shown in Italics.

Race 3 Bert Hawthorne was fatally injured in practice.

== Final point standings ==
=== Driver ===
For every race points were awarded: 9 points to the winner, 6 for runner-up, 4 for third place, 3 for fourth place, 2 for fifth place and 1 for sixth place. No additional points were awarded. The best 10 results count. No driver had a point deduction.

Place	Name	Team	Chassis	Engine	MAL (United Kingdom)	THR (United Kingdom)	HOC (West Germany)	PAU (France)	CRY (United Kingdom)	HOC (West Germany)	ROU (France)	ÖST (Austria)	EMM (Italy)	MAN (Sweden)	IMO (Italy)	SAL (Austria)	ALB (France)	HOC (West Germany)	Points
1	(United Kingdom) Mike Hailwood	Team Surtees	Surtees	Ford	2	-	-	2	6	-	9	9	-	9	-	9	-	9	55
2	(France) Jean-Pierre Jaussaud	Écurie A.S.C.A.	Brabham	Ford	-	-	9	3	-	9	-	-	2	4	1	-	9	-	37
3	(France) Patrick Depailler	Coombs Racing	March	Ford	-	-	-	6	2	-	-	3	-	-	9	1	6	-	27
4	(Argentina) Carlos Reutemann	Motul Rondel Racing	Brabham	Ford	4	-	-	-	4	3	6	6	-	1	2	-	-	-	26
5	(Austria) Niki Lauda	March Engineering	March	Ford	6	9	-	-	-	-	-	-	6	-	-	2	-	2	25
6	(United Kingdom) Dave Morgan	Edward Reeves Racing	Brabham	Ford	9	-	-	-	-	2	4	4	-	-	-	4	-	-	23
7	(France) Bob Wollek	Motul Rondel Racing	Brabham	Ford	-	-	4	1	-	-	1	2	9	-	-	-	4	-	21
8	(South Africa) Jody Scheckter	McLaren	McLaren	Ford	3	-	-	-	9	-	-	-	3	-	-	-	-	-	15
9	(United Kingdom) Mike Beuttler	Team Clarke-Mordaunt	March	Ford	-	-	6	-	-	6	-	-	-	-	-	-	-	-	12
	(United Kingdom) Peter Gethin	Chevron Racing	Chevron	Ford	-	-	-	9	-	-	-	-	-	-	-	3	-	-	12
11	(Argentina) Carlos Ruesch	Team Surtees	Surtees	Ford	-	-	-	-	-	1	-	1	-	2	6	-	1	-	11
12	(Brazil) Wilson Fittipaldi	Team Bardahl	Brabham	Ford	-	-	-	-	-	-	-	-	-	-	4	-	-	6	10
13	(Switzerland) Xavier Perrot	Squadra Tartarurga	March	Ford	1	-	3	-	-	4	-	-	-	-	-	-	-	-	8
14	(France) Jean-Pierre Jabouille	Coombs Racing	March	Ford	-	-	-	-	-	-	-	-	-	6	-	-	-		7
14	(France) Jean-Pierre Jabouille	Coombs Racing	Elf-Alpine	Ford														1	7
15	(France) Patrick Dal Bo	Banting & Earle Racing	Pygmée	Ford	-	6	-	-	-	-	-	-	-	-	-	-	-	-	6
	(Brazil) Carlos Pace	Team Surtees	Surtees	Ford	-	-	-	-	-	-	-	-	-	-	-	6	-	-	6
17	(Denmark) Tom Belsø	Team Viking	Brabham	Ford	-	-	2	-	-	-	-	-	-	-	-	-	3	-	5
	(United Kingdom) James Hunt	Hesketh Racing	March	Ford	-	-	-	-	-	-	-	-	-	-	-	-	2	3	5
19	(Italy) Claudio Francisci	Elcom Racing	Brabham	Ford	-	4	-	-	-	-	-	-	-	-	-	-	-	-	4
	(United Kingdom) David Purley	Lec	March	Ford	-	-	-	4	-	-	-	-	-	-	-	-	-	-	4
	(Italy) Andrea de Adamich	Team Surtees	Surtees	Ford	-	-	-	-	-	-	-	-	4	-	-	-	-	-	4
	(United Kingdom) John Watson	Team McCall-Tui	Leda-Tui	Ford	-	-	-	-	-	-	3	-	1	-	-	-	-	-	4
	(Italy) Tino Brambilla	private entry	March	Ford	-	-	-	-	-	-	-	-	-	-	-	-	-	4	4
24	(United Kingdom) Vic Elford	Chevron Racing	Chevron	Ford	-	-	-	-	3	-	-	-	-	-	-	-	-	-	3
	(United States) Brett Lunger	Space Racing	March	Ford	-	-	-	-	-	-	-	-	-	3	-	-	-	-	3
	(Japan) Hiroshi Kazato	Bloore Racing	March	Ford	-	-	-	-	-	-	-	-	-	-	3	-	-	-	3
27	(France) José Dolhem	Team Arnold	March	Ford	-	-	-	-	-	-	2	-	-	-	-	-	-	-	2
28	(United Kingdom) John Wingfield	Nicoby Racing	Brabham	Ford	-	-	1	-	-	-	-	-	-	-	-	-	-	-	1
	(West Germany) Jochen Mass	March Engineering	March	Ford	-	-	-	-	1	-	-	-	-	-	-	-	-	-	1

Note:

Only drivers which were not graded were able to score points.

Race 2 not all points were awarded (not enough finishers).

== Non-championship race results ==
Other Formula Two races, which did not count towards the European Championship, also held in 1972.

Race name	Circuit	Date	Winning driver	Constructor
(West Germany) XXXV Internationales ADAC-Eifelrennen	Nürburgring	30 April	(West Germany) Jochen Mass	(United Kingdom) March-Ford
(Italy) XIV Gran Premio della Lotteria di Monza	Monza	29 June	(United Kingdom) Graham Hill	(United Kingdom) Brabham-Ford
