= Rondel Racing =

(United Kingdom) Rondel Racing
- Founded: 1971
- Folded: 1974
- Team principal(s): Ron Dennis; Neil Trundle (Chairman: Tony Vlassopulos)
- Former series: Formula Two

Rondel Racing was a British racing team that competed in the Formula Two series between 1971 and 1973. The team was founded by two ex-Brabham mechanics Ron Dennis and Neil Trundle. Rondel won five European Championship races before being forced to close down in 1973 due to a number of factors including lack of money, loss of Motul support and NatWest Bank calling in a £5,000 overdraft over a workshop floor installed by Dennis.

== Formation and 1971 season ==
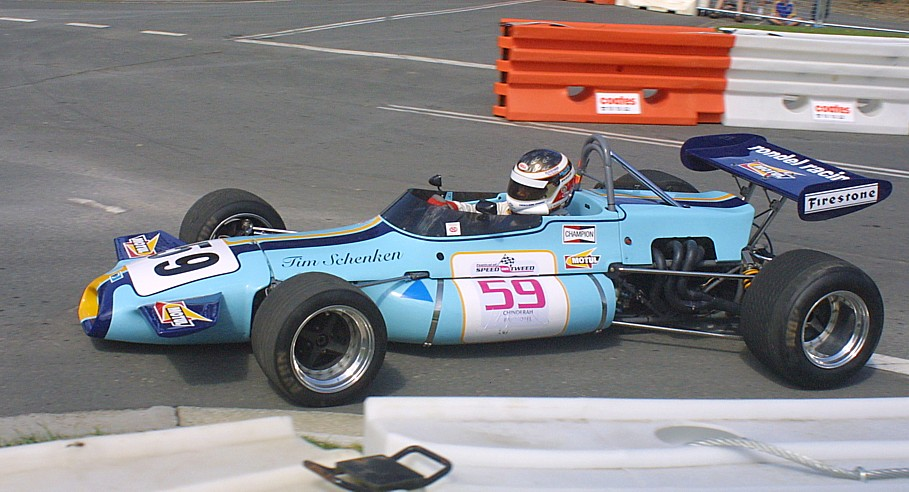
A Rondel Racing Brabham BT36, as driven in 1971 by Tim Schenken.

At the end of the 1970 Formula One season, driver and team owner Jack Brabham retired from the sport and sold his shares in the Brabham team to Ron Tauranac. Jack Brabham's chief mechanic, Ron Dennis and his friend and colleague, Neil Trundle, decided to form their own racing team. The Brabham BT36 cars initially used by the team were bought on hire purchase from Tauranac. However, Dennis was trying to find sponsorship. Through Ron's then girlfriend, who was the daughter of John Phelps, director of Phelps Antique Furniture in Twickenham, one of its regular customers Tony Vlassopulos, a barrister son of a Greek Shipowner, was asked to sponsor Rondel. Vlassopulos asked his friend Ken Grob, chairman of Alexander Howden, insurance brokers in London if he was interested in joining in. Grob said yes on the proviso that his young son Ian Grob could be part of the team, which was agreed. From that moment forward, Tony Vlassopulos became Dennis' first sponsor.

The name Rondel, came from the first name of Ron Dennis and a corruption of the last three letters of Trundle's name. Rondel were based in Old Windsor, Berkshire.

For their first season the team attracted two-time Formula One World Champion Graham Hill, who was impressed with the professionalism and attention-to-detail shown by the team. He was joined by his Brabham Formula One teammate Tim Schenken. Trundle was responsible for preparing Schenken's car whilst Dennis prepared Hill's car. At the team's first race at Hockenheim, Hill won his heat and came second to François Cevert overall. Hill secured Rondel their first outright victory only a week later in the second round of that year's European Formula Two Championship at the BARC 200 event, held at Thruxton in the UK. Schenken achieved three second places finishes during the season. Mid-season the team entered a third car, driven by Bob Wollek. Wollek qualified for two races, achieving a best finish of sixth position. Due to his Formula One success, Hill had an 'A' grading, and was unable to score championship points in the races. Schenken and Wollek however were, with Schenken finishing in fourth place in the championship and Wollek in 20th.

== 1972 season ==
French oil company Motul agreed to sponsor the team from the 1972 season onward. Tim Schenken, Rondel's highest scoring driver in 1971, remained with the team but due to two points finishes in the Formula 1 World Championship the previous season he was given an 'A' grading and was therefore unable to score points. Bob Wollek also remained with the team and Carlos Reutemann joined from Automóvil Club Argentina. Initially, it was intended Reutemann would compete full-time in the F2 series with Rondel, while the works Brabham Formula 1 team would draft him in when the race weekends did not clash. However, from the middle of the season Brabham fielded a third car allowing Reutemann to contest all the remaining F1 races causing him to miss the F2 race at Albi, France. Even so, he finished the championship in fourth position, equaling Tim Schenken's achievement for the team the previous season. Williams Formula One driver Henri Pescarolo drove occasionally for the Rondel team, in part due to Motul's title sponsorship of both Williams and Rondel, and it was Pescarolo that gave the team their first victory of the season at the eleventh round held at Pergusa. Schenken gave the team their other victory in the championship finale in Hockenheim.

== 1973 season ==
For the 1973 season, Rondel aspired to be more than a customer car team and hired Ray Jessop to design their own car. The result was the Motul M1 which was named for the team's sponsor. Up to five Motul M1's were fielded by the team in a race and as early as the round two of the championship, the car was victorious. Pescarolo won the race, with Wollek in second giving Rondel their first one-two finish. Partway through the 1973, the team moved to a new factory in Feltham, Middlesex.

Rondel's final victory came at the Norisring where Tim Schenken won the race, with teammates Tom Pryce and Henri Pescarolo in second and third position. The 1973 season saw a complicated points structure used, where races were divided into basic and complementary races with only a driver's first result from complementary races held in the same country eligible for points. This meant Tom Pryce was not awarded points for his second-place finish at the Norisring, having competed in a previous complementary race in Germany at the Hockenheimring. For 1974, a Ray Jessop-designed F1 car was planned but the oil crisis in 1973 affected backer Motul's support. However, in truth, the funds were not there to support a F1 leap even with Motul involved. Dennis left immediately whilst Trundle continued with the already designed car from Jessop and Vlassopulos and Grob took over the ownership, with the car becoming the Token.

== Legacy ==
Ron Dennis would go on to form three more racing teams, the last of which, Project 4, merged with McLaren putting Dennis in control of the F1 team. As of 2008, Dennis has led McLaren to seven Formula One World Constructors Championships and ten World Drivers Championships.

Neil Trundle moved to Token to run their Formula One car before moving to Tyrrell to work on their six-wheeled P34 car. Trundle rejoined Dennis at his Project 4 team in 1977. He left at the end of 1980 to run his own team in Formula 2,3 and FF2000. He joined McLaren in 1987 and was Ayrton Senna's Chief Mechanic for 1988 and 1989. From 1990-2006 Trundle was the head of McLaren's Gearbox shop.

As of 2019, Trundle is still at McLaren, working on McLaren's heritage vehicles.

== Complete European Formula Two Championship results ==
(key) (results in bold indicate pole position) (results in italics indicate fastest lap)

Year	Chassis	Engine	Drivers	1	2	3	4	5	6	7	8	9	10	11	12	13	14	15	16	17	Points	EDC
1971	Brabham BT36	Cosworth FVA Series		HOC	THR	EIF	JAR	CRP	ROU	MAN	TUL	ALB	VA1	VA2								
1971	Brabham BT36	Cosworth FVA Series	Graham Hill	2	1	5		DNQ	3			5									0	GRA*
1971	Brabham BT36	Cosworth FVA Series	Tim Schenken	5	5	Ret	12	2	8	2	2	Ret	21	DNA							27	4th
1971	Brabham BT36	Cosworth FVA Series	Bob Wollek				DNQ	DNA	DNS	8	6	DNQ									1	20th
1971	Brabham BT36	Cosworth FVA Series	Reine Wisell							21											0	NC
1972	Brabham BT38	Cosworth BDA Series		MAL	THR	HO1	PAU	CRP	HO2	ROU	OST	IMO	MAN	PER	SAL	ALB	HO3					
1972	Brabham BT38	Cosworth BDA Series	Carlos Reutemann	3	DNS	DNA		3	7	3	3	11	6	6	16		Ret				26	4th
1972	Brabham BT38	Cosworth BDA Series	Bob Wollek	13	DNA	3	7	10	10	9	6	2	11	DNA	13	3	Ret				21	7th
1972	Brabham BT38	Cosworth BDA Series	Tim Schenken		DNS				5				15				1				0	GRA*
1972	Brabham BT38	Cosworth BDA Series	Henri Pescarolo		DNS	23	DNQ	DNQ		Ret		DNA		1		DNA	7				0	GRA*
1972	Brabham BT38	Cosworth BDA Series	Max Jean				DNQ									13					0	NC
1972	Brabham BT38	Cosworth BDA Series	Derek Bell				DNA														0	NC
1972	Brabham BT38	Cosworth BDA Series	Jean-Pierre Beltoise					6		Ret											0	GRA*
1972	Brabham BT38	Cosworth BDA Series	Reine Wisell										8			DNA					0	GRA*
1972	Brabham BT38	Cosworth BDA Series	Gerry Birrell																Ret		0	NC
1973	Motul M1	Cosworth BDA Series; Cosworth FVA Series		MAL	HO1	THR	EIF	PAU	KIN	NIV	HO2	ROU	MON	MAN	KAR	PER	SAL	NOR	ALB	VAL		
1973	Motul M1	Cosworth BDA Series; Cosworth FVA Series	Henri Pescarolo		4	1	DNA				5					18		3	Ret		0	GRA*
1973	Motul M1	Cosworth BDA Series; Cosworth FVA Series	Jody Scheckter		12	Ret	DNA		DNA			DNA									0	NC
1973	Motul M1	Cosworth BDA Series; Cosworth FVA Series	Jean-Pierre Jaussaud		17	6	DNA	6	DNA		22	8		6	DNA		DNA	DNA	11		6	11th
1973	Motul M1	Cosworth BDA Series; Cosworth FVA Series	Tim Schenken		21	Ret	2	3	3		20	3			4	4		1	7		0	GRA*
1973	Motul M1	Cosworth BDA Series; Cosworth FVA Series	Bob Wollek		22	2	6	5	8	24	DNS	Ret		9	DNA	5	DNA	5	Ret		23	6th
1973	Motul M1	Cosworth BDA Series; Cosworth FVA Series	Tom Pryce							11	15	Ret		5	Ret	DNA	DNA	2	15		2	28th

* Graded driver, ineligible to score points
