= Ronnie Peterson =

Swedish racing driver (1944–1978)

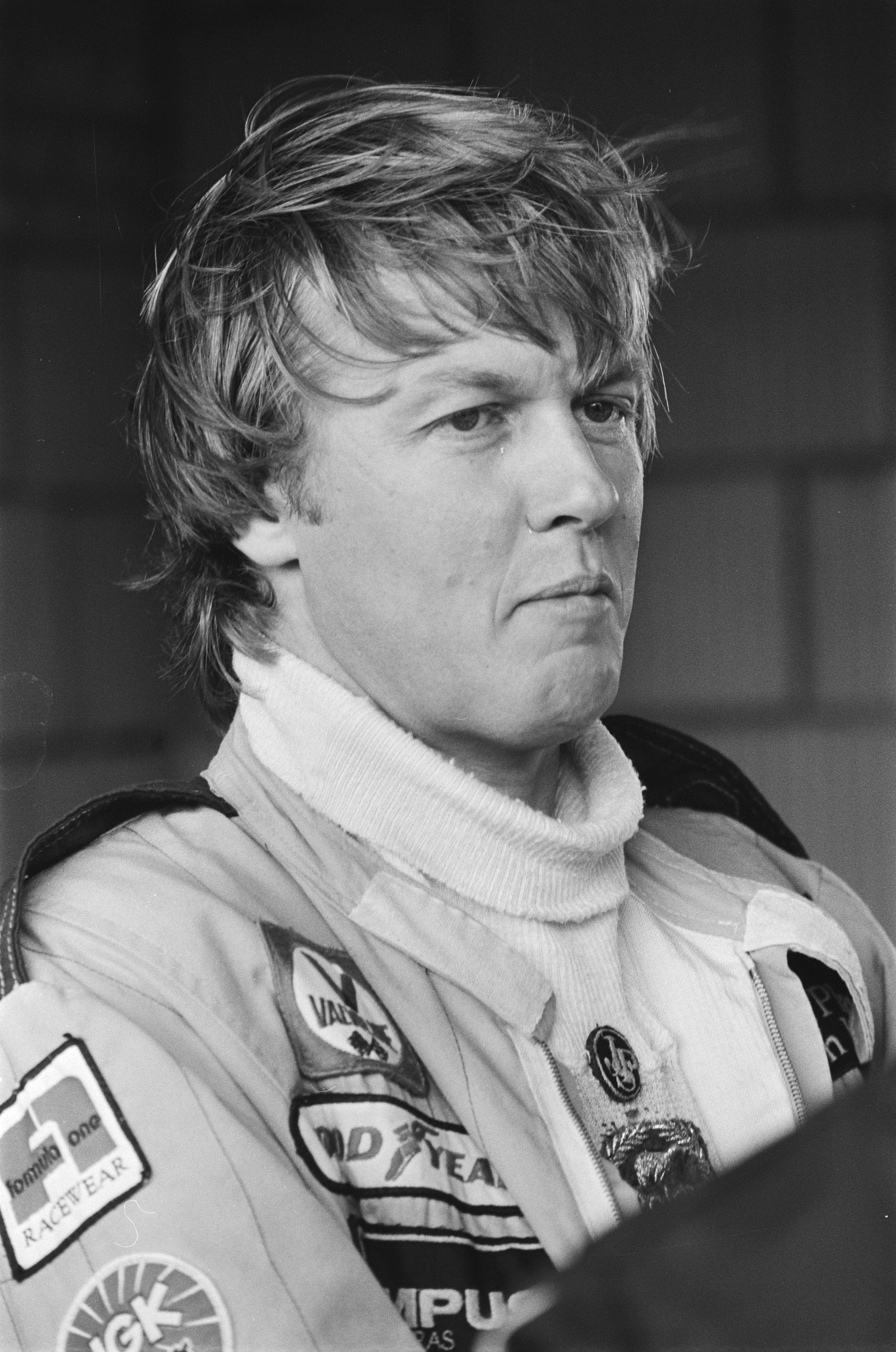
- Peterson at the 1978 Dutch Grand Prix
- Born: Bengt Ronnie Peterson; 14 February 1944; Örebro, Sweden
- Died: 11 September 1978 (aged 34); Milan, Italy
- Cause of death: Injuries sustained at the 1978 Italian Grand Prix
- Spouse: Barbro Edwardsson (m. 1975)
- Children: 1

Formula One World Championship career
- Nationality: (Sweden) Swedish
- Active years: 1970–1978
- Team(s): Crabbe, March, Lotus, Tyrrell
- Entries: 123
- Championships: 0
- Wins: 10
- Podiums: 26
- Career points: 206
- Pole positions: 14
- Fastest laps: 9
- First entry: 1970 Monaco Grand Prix
- First win: 1973 French Grand Prix
- Last win: 1978 Austrian Grand Prix
- Last entry: 1978 Italian Grand Prix

Bengt Ronnie Peterson (Swedish: [ˈrɔ̌nːɪ ˈpêtːɛˌʂɔn]; 14 February 1944 – 11 September 1978) was a Swedish racing driver who competed in Formula One from 1970 to 1978. Nicknamed "Superswede", (Note: Peterson was nicknamed Superswede, a portmanteau of "super" and "Swede".) Peterson twice finished runner-up in the Formula One World Drivers' Championship in 1971 and 1978, and won 10 Grands Prix across nine seasons.

Peterson began his motor racing career in kart racing, traditionally the discipline where the majority of race drivers begin their careers in open-wheel racing. After winning a number of karting titles, including two Swedish titles in 1963 and 1964, he moved on to Formula Three, where he won the Monaco Grand Prix Formula Three support race for the 1969 Grand Prix. Later that year he won the FIA European Formula 3 Championship and moved up into Formula One, racing for the March factory team. In his three-year spell with the team, he took six podiums, most of which were scored during the 1971 Formula One season in which he also finished as runner-up in the Drivers' Championship.

After seeing out his three-year contract at March, Peterson joined Colin Chapman's Team Lotus in the 1973 season, partnering defending champion Emerson Fittipaldi. During his first two seasons with Lotus, Peterson took seven victories, scoring a career-best 52 points in 1973. After a poor 1975 season, Peterson moved back to March and scored his final victory for the team at the 1976 Italian Grand Prix. After spending the 1977 season with Tyrrell, he moved back to Lotus for the 1978 season as number two driver to Mario Andretti. Peterson scored two wins, at the South African and Austrian Grand Prix races, and finished second in the Drivers' Championship standings despite his fatal first-lap accident at Monza during the Italian Grand Prix.

== Early life ==
Peterson was born in the borough of Almby in Örebro, Sweden. He developed his driving style at a young age while competing in karting, and rapidly worked his way up to the pinnacle of European karting before switching to cars.

== Formulas Three and Two ==
After his karting years, Peterson entered Formula Three racing in the Svebe, a 1-litre, Brabham-derived Formula car he co-designed with his father Bengt (who was a baker) and Sven Andersson.

Superb results from the outset quickly attracted the attention of the ambitious Tecno company from Italy, who signed Peterson in 1968. With them, he won the 1969 Formula Three Championship and the 1969 Monaco Formula Three race.

Even after his elevation to F1 status, Peterson still drove in lower echelon racing series (which was common at the time), winning the 1971 European Formula Two Championship driving for March.

== Formula One ==
=== Early years ===
Peterson made his Grand Prix debut in a March 701 for Colin Crabbe's works-supported Antique Automobiles Racing Team at the 1970 Monaco Grand Prix. The limited budget of Crabbe's privateer team allowed only minimal testing, and Peterson qualified 12th out of 16 cars in the race. He was ten places behind Jackie Stewart and Chris Amon, both on the front row of the grid in their newer specification 701s, but only just behind the more experienced Jo Siffert in the second works March. Peterson was the only March driver to finish the race, in seventh place. In 1971, Peterson moved up to the full March works team, and made an instant impression. Five Formula One Grand Prix second places earned him the position of runner-up to Jackie Stewart in that year's World Championship. Within that year, Peterson drove in the World Sports Car Championship driving an Autodelta Alfa Romeo to win the Watkins Glen 6 hours. Peterson stayed at March until 1973, when he signed for John Player Team Lotus to partner Emerson Fittipaldi.

=== 1973–1976 ===
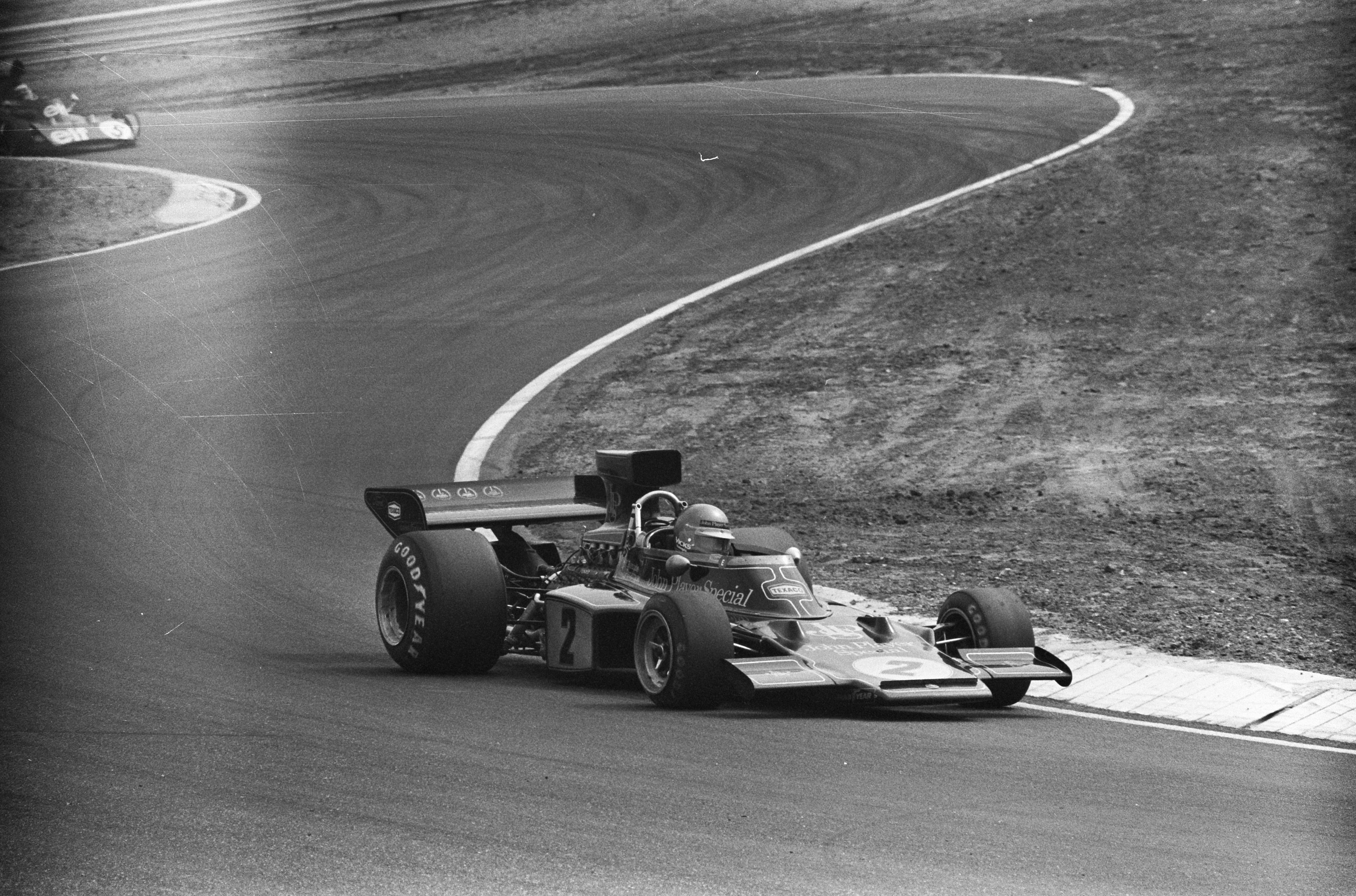
Peterson in the Lotus 72 at the 1973 Dutch Grand Prix.

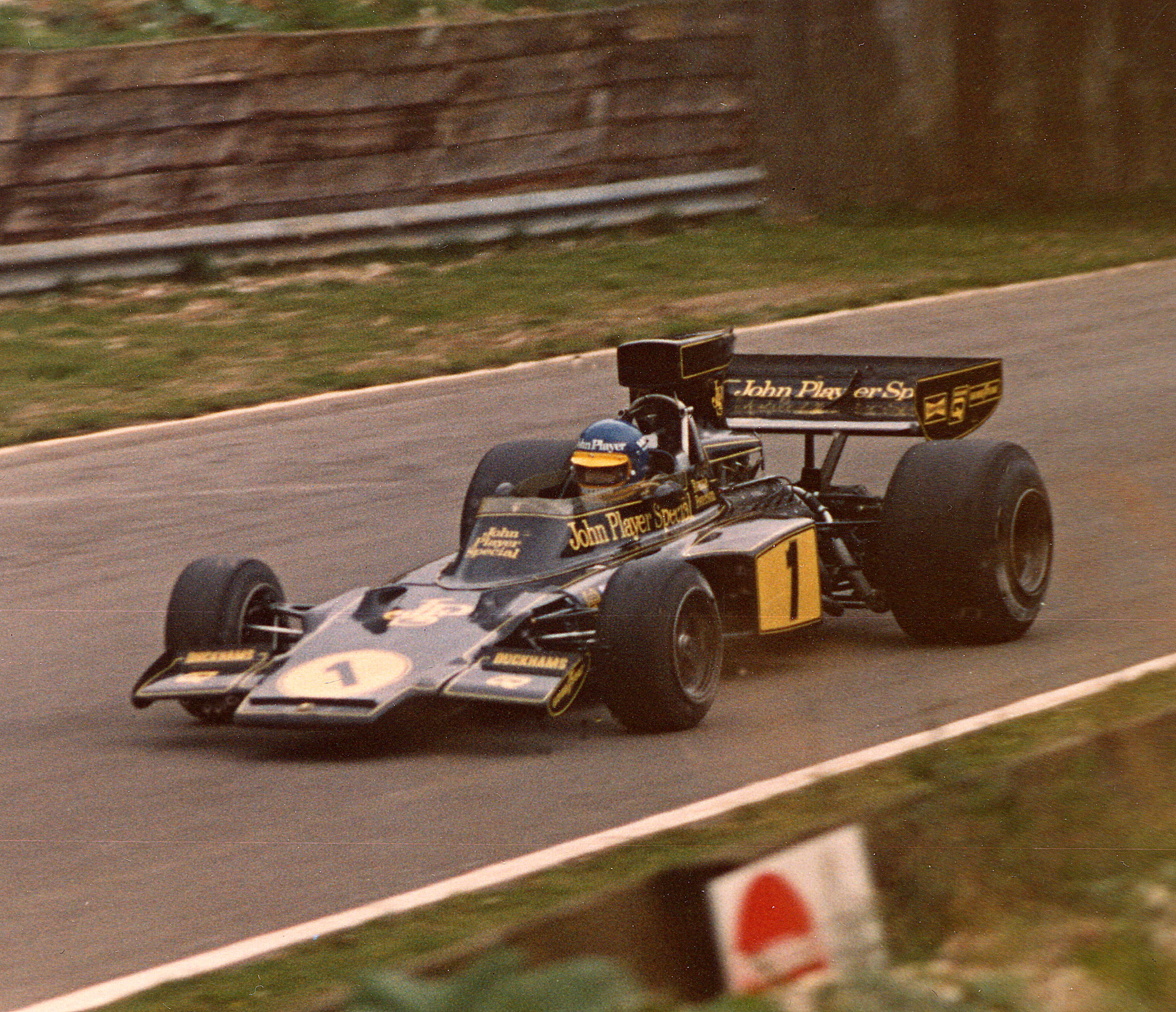
Peterson at the 1974 British Grand Prix

Peterson's first Grand Prix win was at the 1973 French Grand Prix, held at Paul Ricard, in a Lotus 72. He took three more wins that year, in Austria, Italy and the United States, but poor reliability restricted him to only third place in the World Championship at season's end.

For 1974, the Lotus 76 was brought forth. The car, however, proved to be a failure, disliked by both Peterson and his teammate Jacky Ickx. The team therefore opted to let them drive the much older Lotus 72s. Peterson did well in the old car and claimed three more victories: the French and Italian Grands Prix, as well as the Monaco Grand Prix.

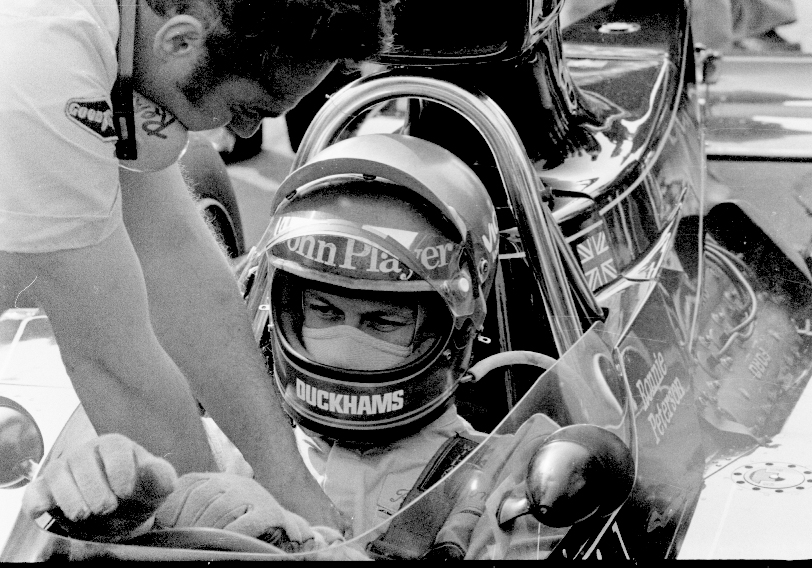
Ronnie Peterson at Silverstone in 1975.

1975 was a bad year for Lotus. Peterson and Ickx were forced to drive with the now archaic 72 model, whose age was now really beginning to show.

Peterson had signed for Shadow but Lotus owner Colin Chapman convinced him to stay with Lotus due to a promise Chapman made to accelerate the rate of development on the Lotus 77. He drove the first race of 1976 in the Lotus 77 before rejoining March Engineering. Driving the March 761, he won the Italian Grand Prix.

Peterson also continued to drive sports cars, particularly for BMW in 1974 and 1975. For instance, he was paired with Hans-Joachim Stuck in a BMW 3.0 CSL for the South African "Wynn's 1000" in November 1975, where they started on pole but finished in second after a number of stops with engine vibrations, spark plug, and similar problems. Stuck and Peterson raced together for BMW in Europe, Africa, and also in North America.

=== 1977: Tyrrell ===
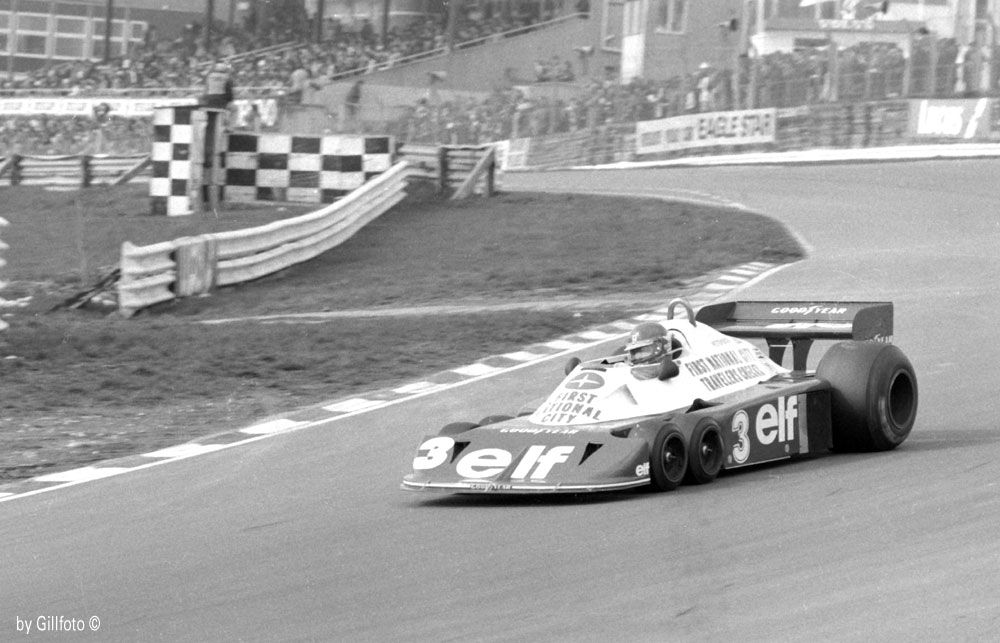
Peterson driving the Tyrrell P34B at the 1977 Race of Champions.

In 1977, he raced for Tyrrell, driving the six-wheel Tyrrell P34B. Peterson retired from the opening four races of 1977, he spun off in Argentina, was involved in a crash with Jochen Mass's McLaren and Clay Regazzoni's Ensign in Brazil, and suffered fuel systems problems in South Africa and United States West. He finished eighth in Spain but retired at Monaco with brake failure. Peterson's only podium finish was a third place at a rain-affected race in Belgium. Hopes were high at home in Sweden but Peterson retired with ignition problems and then finished 12th at France. He had an engine failure in Britain, finished ninth at Germany and got fifth in Austria. Peterson retired with ignition problems at Holland, sixth in Italy and 16th in the United States. Peterson retired from the last two races of 1977, a fuel leak in Canada and in Japan, he collided with Gilles Villeneuve's Ferrari but the crash killed a marshal and photographer as they were standing in a prohibited area of the track when the accident occurred.

=== 1978: Lotus ===
Peterson surprised many by leaving Tyrrell to return to John Player Team Lotus for 1978. He won the 1978 South African Grand Prix, with a last-lap victory over Patrick Depailler, as well as the Austrian Grand Prix, in the innovative 'ground effect' Lotus 79. His teammate Mario Andretti won the Drivers' Championship with Peterson acting effectively as the Team "No. 2" with the pair scoring four 1–2 wins, all with Andretti at the lead. Both of Peterson's wins occurred when Andretti encountered trouble, with Andretti winning once when Peterson failed to finish (not including the Italian Grand Prix). Many times, Peterson followed Andretti closely home, leading to speculation that team orders were in place.

Throughout the 1970s, Peterson had the reputation of being the fastest driver in F1 in terms of raw speed. During the 1978 season, Andretti would frequently post the faster qualifying time. Another view, held by some contemporary observers, was that while Peterson may have in fact been the outright quicker of the two, it was Andretti's considerable car development skills that brought the recalcitrant Lotus 78 and 79 to full potential, and Peterson's seeming deference to Andretti was a tacit acknowledgement of this. Despite this, Peterson was offered a seat at McLaren in 1979. Peterson refused to contribute to any controversy, and on numerous occasions dismissed the speculation by stating that Andretti had simply turned the faster time.

== Death ==
The 1978 Italian Grand Prix at Monza started badly for Peterson. In practice he damaged his Lotus 79 race car beyond immediate repair and bruised his legs in the process. Team Lotus had a spare 79, but it had been built for Andretti, and the much taller Peterson did not fit comfortably inside. The team's only other car was a type 78, the previous year's car, which had been dragged around the F1 circuit that season with minimal maintenance.

In the days after the race, many drivers on circuit stated that the race starter lit the green light for the race too early. Although a Formula One start is meant to be a standing start for all cars in the field, the early green light meant that cars in the rear rows were still rolling when the green light came on. This resulted in cars in the back getting a jump on those at the front, and an accordion effect as the cars approached the first chicane, bunching them tightly together. The front four, Andretti, Gilles Villeneuve, Jean-Pierre Jabouille and Niki Lauda, were far enough ahead to avoid any drama, but Peterson had made a poor start from the third row of the grid, and was immediately passed by Alan Jones, Jacques Laffite and John Watson.

Jody Scheckter and Riccardo Patrese, starting tenth and 12th, had moved to the right across the line that separated the Grand Prix front straight from the approach to the old Monza banking. While Scheckter's Wolf was able to rejoin the track well ahead of the bunching pack, Patrese moved back in just ahead of James Hunt, who feinted left and collided with Peterson, with Vittorio Brambilla, Carlos Reutemann, Hans-Joachim Stuck, Patrick Depailler, Didier Pironi, Derek Daly, Clay Regazzoni and Brett Lunger all involved in the ensuing melee.

Peterson's Lotus went into the barriers hard and caught fire before bouncing back into the middle of the track. He was trapped in the burning wreck, but Hunt, Regazzoni and Depailler managed to free him before he received more than minor burns, while track marshals were extinguishing the car. He was dragged free and laid in the middle of the track fully conscious, but with severe leg injuries. Hunt later said he, along with Didier Pironi stopped Peterson from looking at his legs to spare him further distress.

At the time there was more concern for Brambilla, who had been hit on the head by a flying wheel and was slumped comatose in his car. Brambilla was seriously hurt and did not race again in Formula One until a year later. Peterson's life was not seen to be in any danger. Sid Watkins and his medical team headed over to Brambilla's car to extract him from the wreckage. The injured drivers along with Peterson were taken to the hospital Ospedale Niguarda Ca' Granda in Milan and the race was restarted when the track had been cleaned up.

At the hospital, Peterson's X-rays showed he had about 27 fractures in his legs and feet. After discussion with him, Peterson was sent to intensive care so that the surgeons could operate to stabilize the bones. There was some level of dispute between the doctors regarding whether all fractures should be immediately fixed or not. During the night, Peterson's condition worsened, and he was diagnosed with fat embolism. By morning he was in full kidney failure due to the embolism, and was declared dead at 9:55 am on 11 September 1978.

His teammate Mario Andretti clinched the championship at the race. "It was so unfair to have a tragedy connected with probably what should have been the happiest day of my career", Andretti said, "I couldn't celebrate, but also, I knew that trophy would be with me forever. And I knew also that Ronnie would have been happy for me". Peterson took second place in the 1978 drivers' standings posthumously.

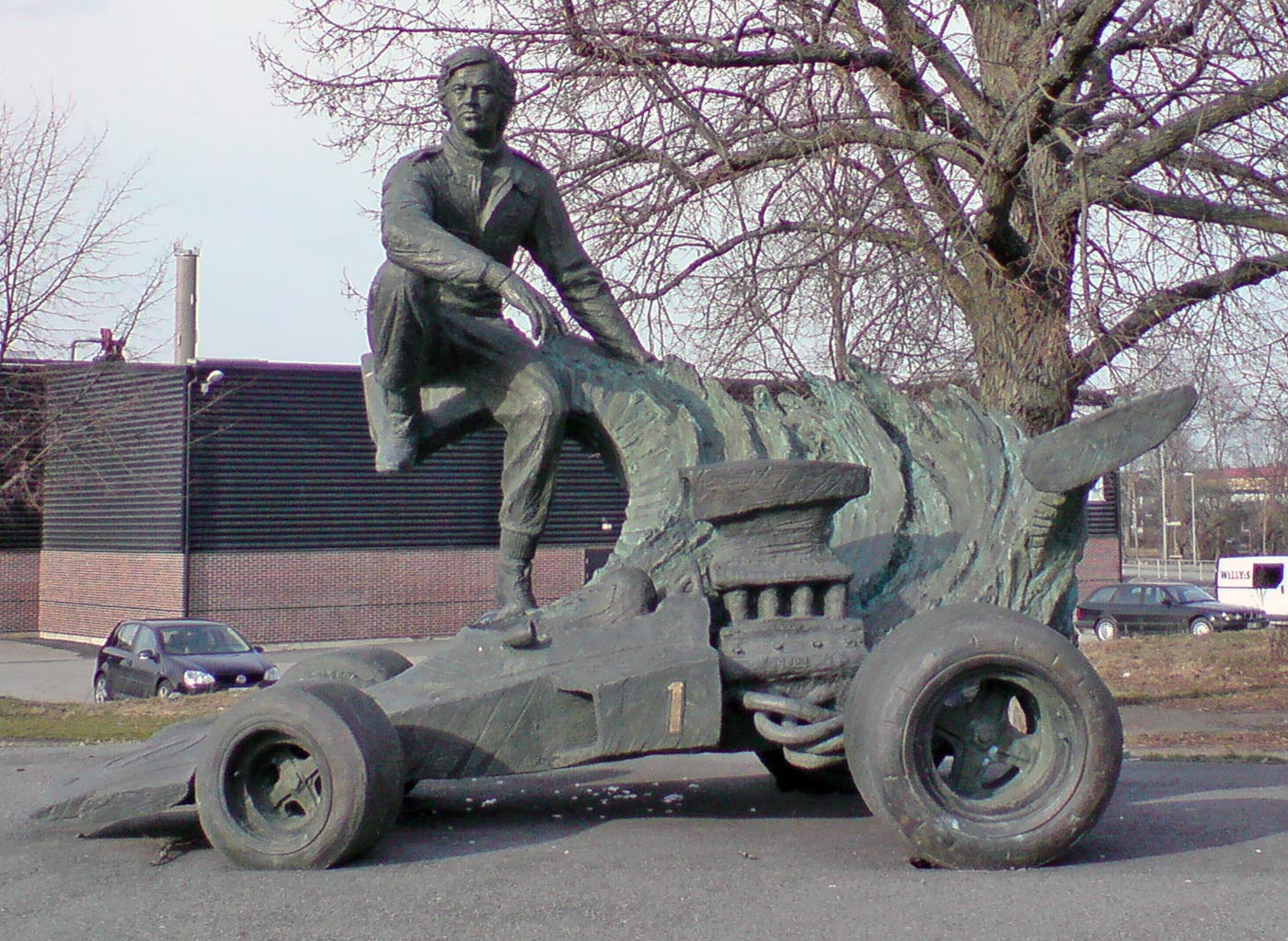
The statue of Ronnie Peterson in Almby, Örebro, was unveiled in August 2003.

Peterson competed in 123 Grand Prix races during his career, winning ten of them.

At his funeral, the pallbearers included Åke Strandberg, James Hunt, Jody Scheckter, John Watson, Emerson Fittipaldi, Gunnar Nilsson (who would die a month later) and Niki Lauda.

=== Legacy ===
Peterson is considered by some to be one of the best Formula One drivers to have never won a championship, as well as the best racing driver from Sweden. In 2016, in an academic paper that reported a mathematical modeling study that assessed the relative influence of driver and machine, Peterson was ranked the 21st best Formula One driver of all time, and the sixth best to never win a title.

Arrows driver Riccardo Patrese was blamed by several members of the Grand Prix Drivers' Association (mainly by James Hunt) for being a primary cause of the first lap wreck at the Italian Grand Prix. He was banned from competition for one race, from the 1978 United States Grand Prix.

In 1979, George Harrison paid tribute to Peterson with a song and music video called "Faster".

The circumstances of Peterson's death were prosecuted in an Italian criminal court. Driver Riccardo Patrese and race director Gianni Restilli were both charged with roles; Patrese, for manslaughter because of an unsafe maneuver on track which was considered to be a primary cause of the wreck, and Restilli, as contributing to Peterson's death by starting the race with a premature start signal. Both were cleared of criminal charges on 28 October 1981.

Peterson's widow Barbro (née Edwardsson) never got over his death and committed suicide on 19 December 1987. She was buried alongside Ronnie in the Peterson family grave in Örebro. She and Ronnie had a daughter named Nina Louise (named after Jochen Rindt's wife) who was born in November 1975.

There is a statue of Peterson in Örebro (59.26193°N 15.23812°E) by Richard Brixel. The official Ronnie Peterson Museum was officially opened by Ronnie's daughter, Nina Kennedy, in Örebro on 31 May 2008. The museum closed in October 2009 because it was unable to secure further government funding.

Superswede: A film about Ronnie Peterson (2017), directed by Henrik Jansson-Schweizer, with the participation of Mario Andretti, Emerson Fittipaldi, Nina Kennedy, and Niki Lauda, is available on YouTube, as are several other short tributes.

During the 2014 Monaco Grand Prix, fellow Swedish Formula One driver Marcus Ericsson wore a special helmet in tribute to Peterson which was modeled on Peterson's. Ericsson wore a similar helmet en route to victory in the 2022 Indianapolis 500.

== Racing record ==
=== Career summary ===
Season	Series	Team	Races	Wins	Poles	F/Laps	Podiums	Points	Position
1968	Swedish Formula Three	Tecno Racing Team	?	?	?	?	?	?	**1st**
1969	Swedish Formula Three	Tecno Racing Team	?	?	?	?	?	?	**1st**
1970	Formula One	Antique Automobiles Racing Team	2	0	0	0	0	0	NC
1970	Formula One	Colin Crabbe Racing	7	0	0	0	0	0	NC
1970	European Formula Two	Malcolm Guthrie Racing	6	0	1	0	1	14	4th
1970	24 Hours of Le Mans	Scuderia Ferrari	1	0	0	0	0	N/A	DNF
1971	Formula One	STP March Racing Team	11	0	0	0	5	33	**2nd**
1971	European Formula Two	March Engineering	10	4	4	5	6	54	**1st**
1972	Formula One	STP March Racing Team	12	0	0	0	1	12	9th
1972	World Sportscar Championship	Scuderia Ferrari	9	2	4	2	8	124	NC
1972	European Formula Two	March Engineering	6	1	2	2	3	0	NC^{‡}
1972	British Formula Two	March Engineering	3	2	3	3	2	27	**2nd**
1973	Formula One	John Player Team Lotus	15	4	9	2	7	52	**3rd**
1973	European Formula Two	Team Lotus	5	0	0	0	0	0	NC^{‡}
1974	Formula One	John Player Team Lotus	15	3	1	2	4	35	5th
1974	European Formula Two	March Racing Team	1	1	0	0	1	0	NC^{‡}
1974	World Sportscar Championship	BMW Motorsport	1	0	0	0	0	0	NC
1975	Formula One	John Player Team Lotus	14	0	0	0	0	6	13th
1975	World Sportscar Championship	BMW Motorsport	2	0	0	0	0	0	NC
1975	European Formula Two	Project 3 Racing	1	0	0	0	0	0	NC
1976	Formula One	March Racing Theodore Racing	15	1	1	1	1	10	11th
1976	Formula One	John Player Team Lotus	1	0	0	0	0	10	11th
1976	World Championship for Makes	BMW Motorsport	3	0	1	0	0	14	NC
1976	World Championship for Makes	Schnitzer Motorsport	1	0	0	0	0	14	NC
1976	European Formula Two	March Engineering	1	0	0	0	0	0	NC
1977	Formula One	First National City Travelers Checks Elf Team Tyrrell	17	0	0	1	1	7	14th
1977	World Championship for Makes	BMW Alpina	5	0	0	0	0	13	NC
1978	Formula One	John Player Team Lotus	14	2	3	3	7	51	**2nd**
1978	World Sportscar Championship	McLaren North America	5	0	0	0	0	4	NC

^{‡} Graded drivers not eligible for European Formula Two Championship points

=== Complete European Formula Two Championship results ===
(key) (Races in bold indicate pole position; races in italics indicate fastest lap)

Year	Entrant	Chassis	Engine	1	2	3	4	5	6	7	8	9	10	11	12	13	14	15	16	17	Pos.	Pts
1970	Malcolm Guthrie Racing	March 702	Ford	THR; DNS	HOC; Ret	BAR; Ret	ROU; 6	PER	TUL; 5	IMO; 4	**HOC**; 3										4th	14
1971	March Engineering	March 712M	Ford	**HOC**; Ret	THR; 2	NÜR; Ret	**JAR**; Ret	PAL; 3	ROU; 1	**MAN**; 1	**TUL**; 1	ALB; 6	VAL; 1	VAL							1st	54
1972	March Engineering	March 722	Ford	**MAL**; Ret	**THR**; 1	HOC	PAU	PAL	HOC; 3	ROU	ÖST	IMO	MAN; Ret	PER	SAL; Ret	ALB	HOC; 3				NC	0^{‡}
1973	Team Lotus	Lotus 74	Ford	MAL	HOC	THR	NÜR	PAU	KIN	NIV; Ret	HOC	ROU; DNS	MNZ	MAN	KAR; 5	PER; 7	SAL	NOR	ALB; DSQ	VLL; Ret	NC	0^{‡}
1974	March Racing Team	March 742	BMW	BAR	HOC	PAU	SAL	HOC	MUG	KAR; 1	PER	HOC	VLL								NC	0^{‡}
1975	Project 3 Racing	March 752	BMW	EST	THR; Ret	HOC	NÜR	PAU	HOC	SAL	ROU	MUG	PER	SIL	ZOL	NOG	VLL				NC	0
1976	March Engineering	March 762	BMW	HOC; Ret	THR	VLL	SAL	PAU	HOC	ROU	MUG	PER	EST	NOG	HOC						NC	0

^{‡} Graded drivers not eligible for European Formula Two Championship points

=== Complete Formula One World Championship results ===
(key) (races in bold indicate pole position; races in italics indicate fastest lap)

Year	Entrant	Chassis	Engine	1	2	3	4	5	6	7	8	9	10	11	12	13	14	15	16	17	WDC	Pts
1970	Antique Automobiles Racing Team	March 701	Ford Cosworth DFV 3.0 V8	RSA	ESP	MON; 7	BEL; NC														NC	0
1970	Colin Crabbe Racing	March 701	Ford Cosworth DFV 3.0 V8					NED; 9	FRA; Ret	GBR; 9	GER; Ret	AUT	ITA; Ret	CAN; NC	USA; 11	MEX					NC	0
1971	STP March Racing Team	March 711	Ford Cosworth DFV 3.0 V8	RSA; 10	ESP; Ret	MON; 2	NED; 4		GBR; 2	GER; 5	AUT; 8	ITA; 2	CAN; 2	USA; 3							**2nd**	**33**
1971	STP March Racing Team	March 711	Alfa Romeo T33 3.0 V8					FRA; Ret													**2nd**	**33**
1972	STP March Racing Team	March 721	Ford Cosworth DFV 3.0 V8	ARG; 6	RSA; 5																9th	12
1972	STP March Racing Team	March 721X	Ford Cosworth DFV 3.0 V8			ESP; Ret	MON; 11	BEL; 9													9th	12
1972	STP March Racing Team	March 721G	Ford Cosworth DFV 3.0 V8						FRA; 5	GBR; 7	GER; 3	AUT; 12	ITA; 9	CAN; DSQ	USA; 4						9th	12
1973	John Player Team Lotus	Lotus 72D	Ford Cosworth DFV 3.0 V8	ARG; Ret	**BRA**; Ret	RSA; 11															**3rd**	**52**
1973	John Player Team Lotus	Lotus 72E	Ford Cosworth DFV 3.0 V8				**ESP**; Ret	**BEL**; Ret	MON; 3	**SWE**; 2	FRA; 1	**GBR**; 2	**NED**; 11	GER; Ret	AUT; 1	**ITA**; 1	**CAN**; Ret	**USA**; 1			**3rd**	**52**
1974	John Player Team Lotus	Lotus 72E	Ford Cosworth DFV 3.0 V8	**ARG**; 13	BRA; 6				MON; 1	SWE; Ret	NED; 8	FRA; 1	GBR; 10		AUT; Ret	ITA; 1	CAN; 3	USA; Ret			5th	35
1974	John Player Team Lotus	Lotus 76	Ford Cosworth DFV 3.0 V8			RSA; Ret	ESP; Ret	BEL; Ret						GER; 4							5th	35
1975	John Player Team Lotus	Lotus 72E	Ford Cosworth DFV 3.0 V8	ARG; Ret	BRA; 15	RSA; 10	ESP; Ret	MON; 4	BEL; Ret	SWE; 9	NED; 15	FRA; 10	GBR; Ret	GER; Ret	AUT; 5	ITA; Ret	USA; 5				13th	6
1976	John Player Team Lotus	Lotus 77	Ford Cosworth DFV 3.0 V8	BRA; Ret																	11th	10
1976	March Racing	March 761	Ford Cosworth DFV 3.0 V8		RSA; Ret		ESP; Ret	BEL; Ret	MON; Ret	SWE; 7	FRA; 19	GBR; Ret	GER; Ret	AUT; 6	**NED**; Ret	ITA; 1	CAN; 9	USA; Ret	JPN; Ret		11th	10
1976	Theodore Racing	March 761	Ford Cosworth DFV 3.0 V8			USW; 10															11th	10
1977	First National City Travelers Checks Elf Team Tyrrell	Tyrrell P34B	Ford Cosworth DFV 3.0 V8	ARG; Ret	BRA; Ret	RSA; Ret	USW; Ret	ESP; 8	MON; Ret	BEL; 3	SWE; Ret	FRA; 12	GBR; Ret	GER; 9	AUT; 5	NED; Ret	ITA; 6	USA; 16	CAN; Ret	JPN; Ret	14th	7
1978	John Player Team Lotus	Lotus 78	Ford Cosworth DFV 3.0 V8	ARG; 5	**BRA**; Ret	RSA; 1	USW; 4	MON; Ret	BEL; 2								ITA; Ret	USA	CAN		**2nd**	**51**
1978	John Player Team Lotus	Lotus 79	Ford Cosworth DFV 3.0 V8							ESP; 2	SWE; 3	FRA; 2	**GBR**; Ret	GER; Ret	**AUT**; 1	NED; 2					**2nd**	**51**

=== Non-championship Formula One results ===
(key) (races in bold indicate pole position; races in italics indicate fastest lap)

Year	Entrant	Chassis	Engine	1	2	3	4	5	6	7	8
1971	Frank Williams Racing Cars	March 711	Ford Cosworth DFV 3.0 V8	ARG	ROC; Ret						
1971	STP March Racing Team	March 711	Ford Cosworth DFV 3.0 V8			QUE; 18	SPR		RIN; 2	OUL	VIC; 16
1971	STP March Racing Team	March 711	Alfa Romeo T33 3.0 V8					INT; Ret			
1972	STP March Racing Team	March 721X	Ford Cosworth DFV 3.0 V8	ROC; 13			OUL; Ret	REP			
1972	STP March Racing Team	March 721	Ford Cosworth DFV 3.0 V8		BRA; 2	INT					
1972	STP March Racing Team	March 721G	Ford Cosworth DFV 3.0 V8						VIC; 8		
1973	John Player Team Lotus	Lotus 72E	Ford Cosworth DFV 3.0 V8	ROC; Ret	INT; 2						
1974	John Player Team Lotus	Lotus 76	Ford Cosworth DFV 3.0 V8	PRE	ROC	INT; Ret					
1975	John Player Team Lotus	Lotus 72E	Ford Cosworth DFV 3.0 V8	ROC; 3	INT; DNS	SUI; 4					
1977	First National CIty Elf Team Tyrrell	Tyrrell P34	Ford Cosworth DFV 3.0 V8	ROC; 10							
1978	John Player Team Lotus	Lotus 78	Ford Cosworth DFV 3.0 V8	**INT**; Ret							

=== 24 Hours of Le Mans results ===
Year	Team	Co-Drivers	Car	Class	Laps	Pos.	Class Pos.
1970	(Italy) SpA Ferrari SEFAC	(United Kingdom) Derek Bell	Ferrari 512S	S 5.0	39	DNF	DNF

== Bibliography ==
- Henry, Alan (1978). Ronnie Peterson: SuperSwede. Haynes Publishing. ISBN 978-0-85429-175-5.

Sporting positions
Preceded by Reine Wisell	Swedish Formula Three Champion; 1968–1969	Succeeded by Torsten Palm
Preceded by Jean-Pierre Jaussaud	Monaco Formula Three; Race Winner; 1969	Succeeded by Tony Trimmer
Preceded by Clay Regazzoni	European Formula Two; Champion; 1971	Succeeded by Mike Hailwood
Preceded by Brian McGuire	Formula One fatal accidents 10 September 1978 (date of accident); 11 September 1978 (date of death)	Succeeded by Patrick Depailler
