= Bob Wollek =

French racing driver (1943–2001)

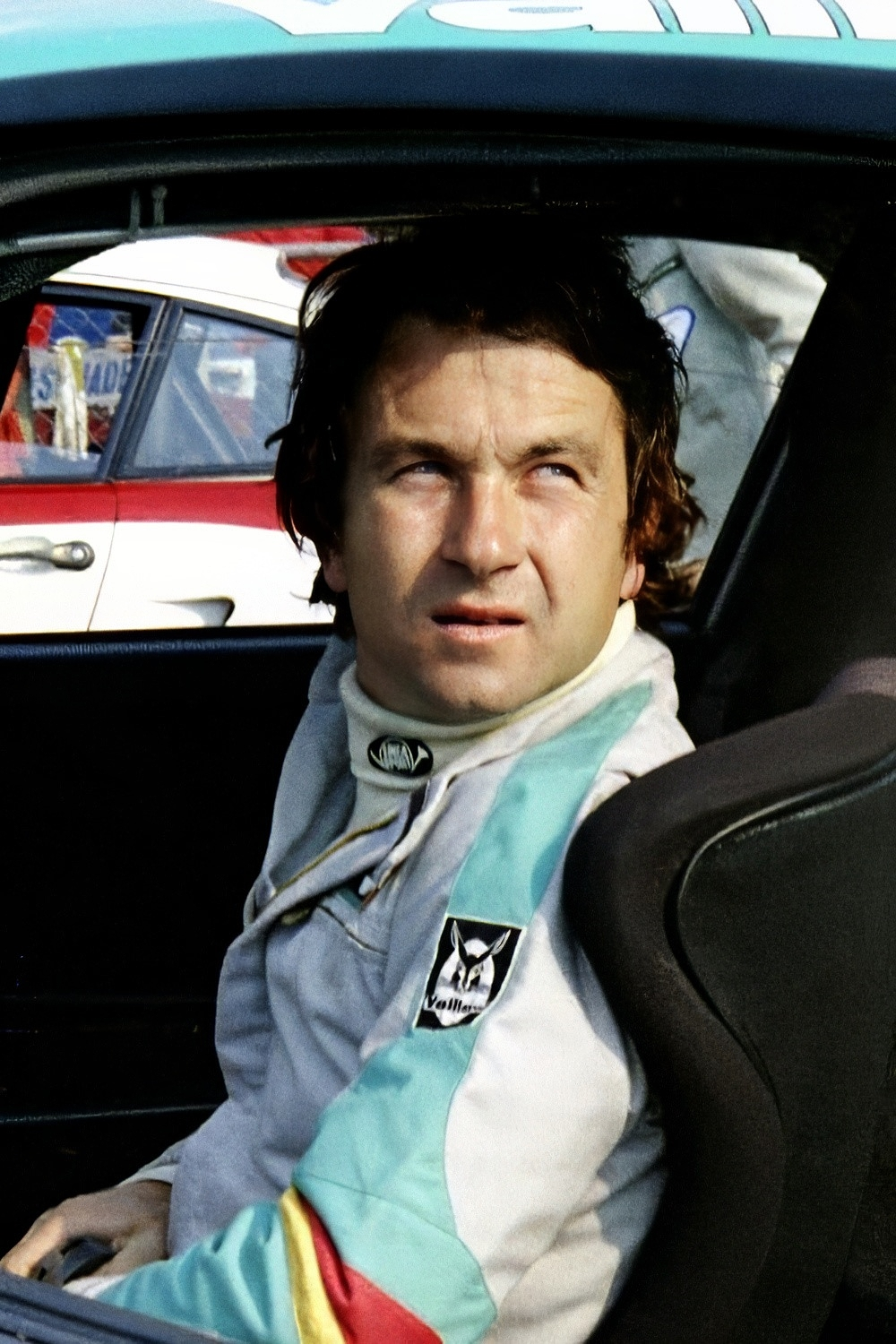
- Nationality: (France) French
- Born: Robert Jean Wollek; 4 November 1943 Strasbourg, France
- Died: 16 March 2001 (aged 57) Sebring, Florida, U.S.
- Wins: 76

Robert Jean "Bob" Wollek (4 November 1943 – 16 March 2001), nicknamed "Brilliant Bob", was a race car driver from Strasbourg, France. He won a total of 76 races in his career, 71 in Porsche cars, including four editions of the 24 Hours of Daytona and one edition of the 12 Hours of Sebring. He died in a road accident in Florida while riding a bicycle back to his accommodation after the day's practice sessions for the following day's race, the 12 Hours of Sebring.

== Skiing career ==
Bob Wollek
Medal record

Men's Skiing

Representing France

Winter Universiade
Gold medal – first place	1966 Sestriere	Men's downhill
Gold medal – first place	1966 Sestriere	Men's giant slalom
Gold medal – first place	1966 Sestriere	Men's combined
Silver medal – second place	1966 Sestriere	Men's slalom
Silver medal – second place	1968 Innsbruck	Men's combined

Prior to his racing days as a university student, Wollek was also a member of the French National Skiing Team between 1966 and 1968 competing in the Winter Universiade, he won three gold and two silver medals altogether (see table on the right).

Wollek's skiing career came to an end when he was injured during preparations for the Winter Olympics.

== Early racing career ==
Prior to a skiing accident which ended his skiing career, Wollek began racing cars when he entered the Mont-Blanc Rally in 1967 driving a Renault 8 Gordini and won. The following year, when his skiing career ended, he started his racing career when he entered a Volant Shell scholarship race taking place at the Le Mans' Bugatti Circuit, finishing runner-up to François Migault. Wollek later entered the Alpine Trophy Le Mans which he won, earning himself a place for the 1968 24 Hours of Le Mans where he finished 11th overall and second in class on his debut driving an Alpine A210.

In 1969, Wollek made his debut in single seater racing competing in Formula France before graduating to the French Formula Three Championship.

During a round at Rouen-Les-Essarts, Wollek was involved in a fatal accident which killed Jean-Luc Salomon, when the pair plus Jean-Pierre Jaussaud, Richard Scott and Mike Beuttler were all fighting for the lead at Scierie, where the track is a two-lane road.

In 1971, Wollek switched to Formula Two driving for Ron Dennis's Rondel Racing. After a shaky start with only one point that year, he improved his performance for the following year with a single win at Imola and 21 points, placing him seventh. Despite this success, he abandoned his Formula One ambition to concentrate on sportscar racing where he would become one of the most recognizable names in the sport.

== Sportscar racing ==
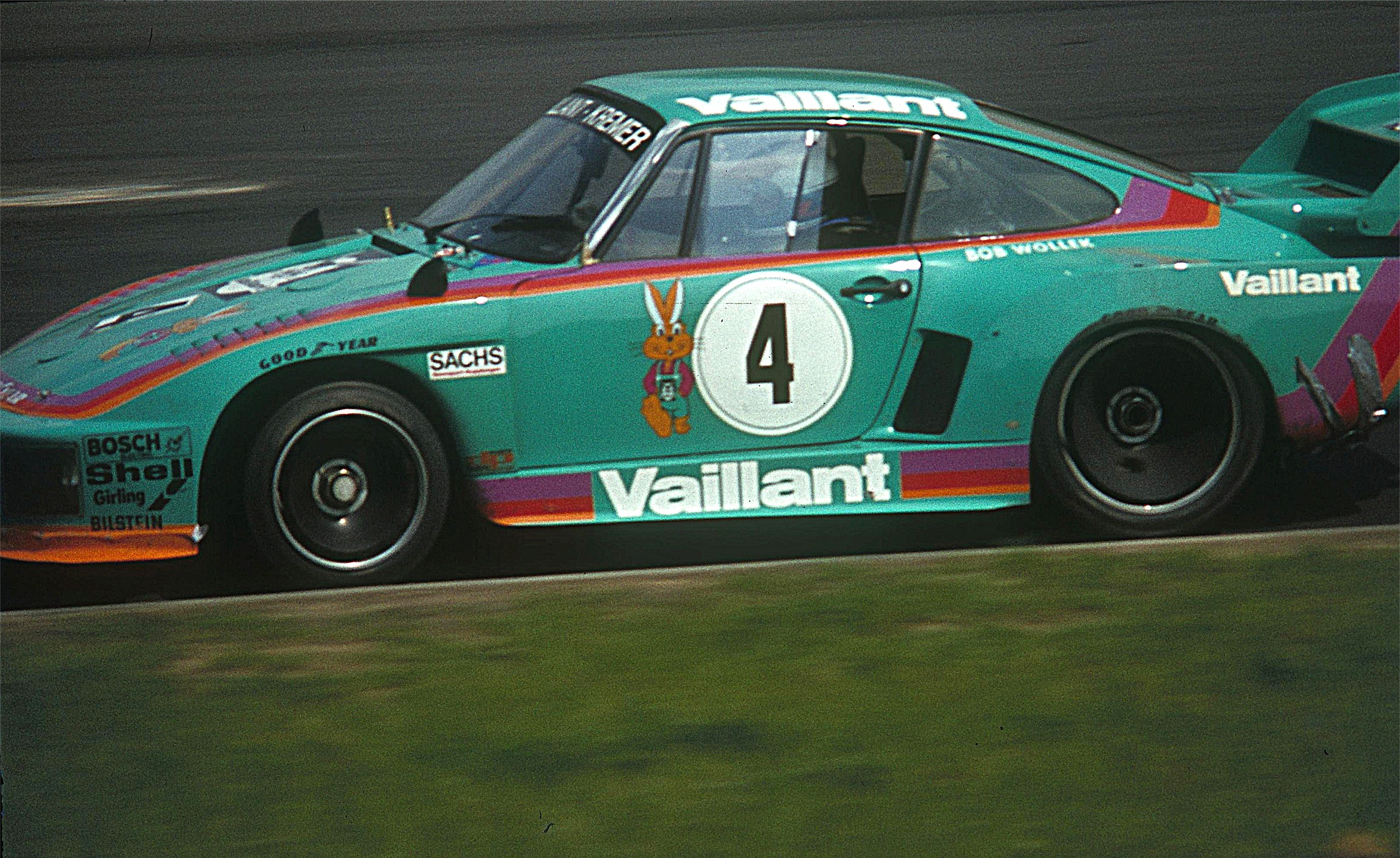
Bob Wollek in a Kremer-Porsche 935K2 at the 1000km Nürburgring in Germany (1977)

During his three decades of sports car racing, almost exclusively in Porsches, Wollek won the 24 Hours of Daytona four times (1983, 1985, 1989, 1991), the DRM in 1982 and 1983, and the European Endurance Championship in 1983, with the Porsche 936 and Porsche 956 entered by the Joest Racing team. In the mid-1970s, he raced a Porsche 935K2 improved and entered by the Kremer Racing team from Cologne.

Wollek won the Porsche Cup, an annual award presented by Porsche AG to recognize the world's most successful privateer racing driver competing with Porsche machinery in a customer racing team, in 1976, 1977, 1978, 1981, 1982, 1983 and 1989.

For many years, Monsieur Porsche challenged the factory team with privately entered cars, but was also hired to become part of the official Porsche Le Mans team in 1978, 1979, 1986, 1987, 1988, 1996, 1997 and 1998. In 1981, he even raced a Group C-spec Kremer-built Porsche 917, about a decade after these cars were retired initially.

Wollek never won the 24 Hours of Le Mans overall, despite coming close in a few of his thirty attempts. In 1997, his leading factory-entered Porsche 911 GT1 suffered damage in a minor incident, so the car had to be retired. In 1998, Porsche scored a 1–2 win, but Bob was once again on the less-lucky runner-up car.

After the 1998 season, Porsche retired its GT1 cars from the Mercedes-dominated FIA GT Championship, providing only Porsche 911 based cars for the lower GT classes. In 2000, Wollek scored many class wins in the American Le Mans Series (ALMS) in a Porsche 996 GT3. The last race Wollek entered was the 2001 12 Hours of Sebring in a Porsche 996 GT3-RS. Wollek had already won there in 1985 with A. J. Foyt, driving a Porsche 962. Despite being over 50 years of age and still racing competitively, Wollek had developed a fitness regime of riding bicycles to stay in good physical condition, especially for the longer races such as the 24 Hours of Le Mans, to which he rode from home across France.

Typical of many other racing drivers, Wollek ran a car dealership for Jaguar.

== Death ==
On Friday 16 March 2001, while leaving Sebring International Raceway following practice for the 12 Hours of Sebring, Wollek continued a tradition of cycling between the circuit and his accommodation, which took him west on Highway 98. While he had been riding close to the edge of the pavement, he was struck from behind by a van driven by an elderly driver from Okeechobee, Florida at approximately 4:30 p.m. He was transported to Highlands Regional Medical Center in Sebring and was pronounced dead on arrival. Wollek was due to start in the Petersen Motorsports Porsche 996 GT3-RS with Johnny Mowlem and Michael Petersen, however out of respect the car was withdrawn from the race. On race day, the organizers held a one-minute silence in memory of Wollek. Prior to his death, he announced he would retire from racing to serve as an ambassador for Porsche, and was due to sign this agreement upon returning home after Sebring.

== Racing record ==
=== Complete 24 Hours of Le Mans results ===
Year	Team	Co-Drivers	Car	Class	Laps	Pos.	Class Pos.
1968	(France) Trophée Le Mans	(France) Christian Ethuin	Alpine A210	P 1.3	282	11th	2nd
1969	(France) Société des Automobiles Alpine	(France) Jean-Claude Killy	Alpine A210	P 1.6	242	DNF	DNF
1973	(France) Equipe Matra-Simca Shell	(France) Patrick Depailler	Matra-Simca MS670B	S 3.0	84	DNF	DNF
1974	(France) Équipe Gitanes	(France) Jean-Pierre Jaussaud (France) José Dolhem	Matra-Simca MS670B	S 3.0	120	DNF	DNF
1975	(France) Écurie Buchet - Cyril Grandet	(France) Cyril Grandet	Porsche 911	GT; Ser.	293	DSQ	DSQ
1976	(Germany) Porsche Kremer Racing	(France) Didier Pironi (France) Marie-Claude Charmasson	Porsche 934	GT	270	19th	4th
1977	(Germany) Porsche Kremer Racing	(Belgium) Jean-Pierre Wielemans (France) Philippe Gurdjian	Porsche 934	GT	298	7th	1st
1978	(Germany) Martini Racing Porsche System	(Belgium) Jacky Ickx (Germany) Jürgen Barth	Porsche 936/78	S +2.0	364	2nd	2nd
1979	(Germany) Essex Motorsport Porsche	(United States) Hurley Haywood	Porsche 936	S +2.0	236	DNF	DNF
1980	(Germany) Gelo Racing Team	(Germany) Helmut Kelleners	Porsche 935	Gr.5	191	DNF	DNF
1981	(Germany) Porsche Kremer Racing	(France) Xavier Lapeyre (France) Guy Chasseuil	Porsche 917K/81	S +2.0	82	DNF	DNF
1982	(Germany) Belga Team Joest Racing	(Belgium) Jean-Michel Martin (Belgium) Philippe Martin	Porsche 936C	C	320	DNF	DNF
1983	(Germany) Sorga S.A. Joest Racing	(Germany) Klaus Ludwig (Sweden) Stefan Johansson	Porsche 956	C	354	6th	6th
1984	(Italy) Martini Racing	(Italy) Alessandro Nannini	Lancia LC2-Ferrari	C1	326	8th	8th
1985	(Italy) Martini Racing	(Italy) Alessandro Nannini (Australia) Lucio Cesario	Lancia LC2-Ferrari	C1	360	6th	6th
1986	(Germany) Rothmans Porsche	(Germany) Jochen Mass (Australia) Vern Schuppan	Porsche 962C	C1	180	DNF	DNF
1987	(Germany) Rothmans Porsche	(Germany) Jochen Mass (Australia) Vern Schuppan	Porsche 962C	C1	16	DNF	DNF
1988	(Germany) Porsche AG	(South Africa) Sarel van der Merwe (Australia) Vern Schuppan	Porsche 962C	C1	192	DNF	DNF
1989	(Germany) Joest Racing	(Germany) Hans-Joachim Stuck	Porsche 962C	C1	382	3rd	3rd
1990	(Germany) Joest Porsche Racing	(Germany) Louis Krages (Sweden) Stanley Dickens	Porsche 962C	C1	346	8th	8th
1990	(Germany) Joest Porsche Racing	(United Kingdom) Jonathan Palmer (France) Philippe Alliot	Porsche 962C	C1	-	DNS	DNS
1991	(United Kingdom) Silk Cut Jaguar (United Kingdom) Tom Walkinshaw Racing	(Italy) Teo Fabi (United Kingdom) Kenny Acheson	Jaguar XJR-12	C2	358	3rd	3rd
1992	(France) Courage Compétition	(France) Henri Pescarolo (France) Jean-Louis Ricci	Cougar C28LM-Porsche	C3	335	6th	1st
1993	(Germany) Joest Porsche Racing	(France) Henri Pescarolo (Germany) Ronny Meixner	Porsche 962C	C2	351	9th	4th
1994	(Japan) Nisso Trust Racing Team	(Sweden) Steven Andskär (South Africa) George Fouché	Toyota 94C-V	LMP1 /C90	328	4th	2nd
1995	(France) Courage Compétition	(France) Éric Hélary (United States) Mario Andretti	Courage C34-Porsche	WSC	297	2nd	1st
1996	(Germany) Porsche AG	(Germany) Hans-Joachim Stuck (Belgium) Thierry Boutsen	Porsche 911 GT1	GT1	353	2nd	1st
1997	(Germany) Porsche AG	(Germany) Hans-Joachim Stuck (Belgium) Thierry Boutsen	Porsche 911 GT1	GT1	238	DNF	DNF
1998	(Germany) Porsche AG	(Germany) Jörg Müller (Germany) Uwe Alzen	Porsche 911 GT1-98	GT1	350	2nd	2nd
1999	(United States) Champion Racing	(Germany) Dirk Müller (Germany) Bernd Mayländer	Porsche 911 GT3-R	GT	292	19th	2nd
2000	(United States) Dick Barbour Racing	(Germany) Dirk Müller (Germany) Lucas Luhr	Porsche 911 GT3-R	GT	319	DSQ	DSQ
