= McLaren M21 =

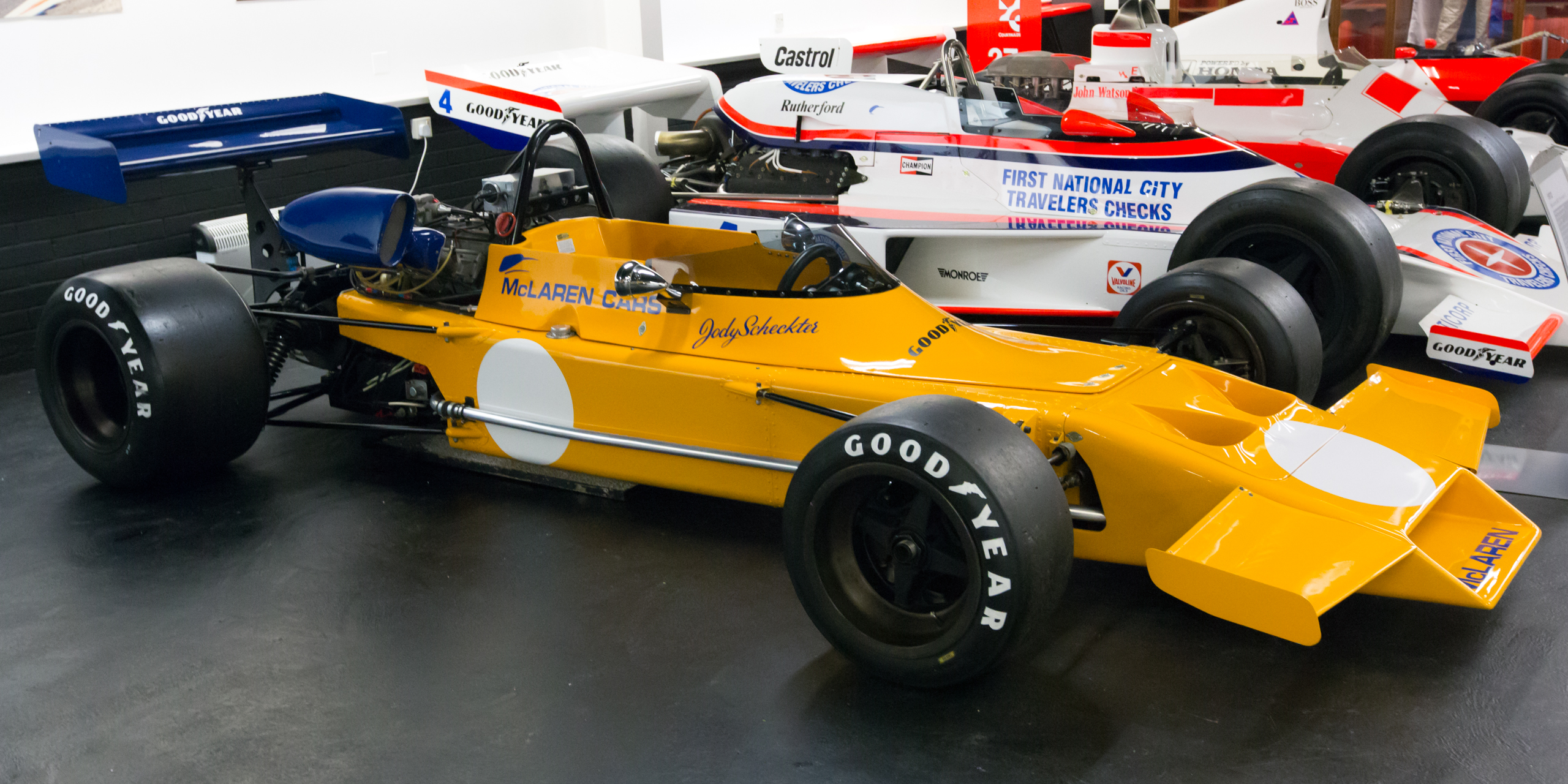
- Category: Formula 2
- Constructor: McLaren
- Designer(s): Ralph Bellamy

Technical specifications
- Chassis: Aluminum monocoque with rear sub-frame
- Engine: Ford-Cosworth BDA/Cosworth BDE/Cosworth BDF, Mid-engine, longitudinally mounted, 1.6–1.9 L (97.6–115.9 cu in), I4, NA
- Transmission: Hewland L.G. 400 5-speed manual
- Power: ~ 210–271 hp (157–202 kW)
- Weight: 465 kg (1,025 lb)

Competition history
- Notable drivers: (South Africa) Jody Scheckter
- Debut: 1972
Entries	Wins
14	1

The McLaren M21 is an open-wheel race car, designed and developed by Australian designer Ralph Bellamy, and built by British constructor and racing team, McLaren, to compete in the European Formula Two Championship in 1972. It was designed to be lower, flatter, and squarer, and more aggressive in stance and design than its predecessor, with the monocoque being positioned, but still retained the regular front-and-rear outboard suspension.It was driven by South African Jody Scheckter. It won one race, at Crystal Palace in 1972, with Scheckter eventually finishing 8th-place in the championship, scoring 15 points. It suffered numerous mechanical and technical problems, including engine failures and handling problems, which prevented it from winning more races. It was powered by either a naturally aspirated 1.6 L (98 cu in) Ford-Cosworth BDA four-cylinder engine, tuned to produce 210 hp (160 kW), or a larger bored-out 1.9 L (120 cu in) Ford-Cosworth BDF, tuned to develop 271 hp (202 kW).
