= Claudio Francisci =

Italian racing driver

Claudio Francisci (born 7 November 1944) is an Italian racing driver.

Francisci competed in the Italian Formula Three Championship in 1969 finishing third and made his European Formula Two Championship debut later that season. He returned to Italian F3 the next year and finished second in points. In 1971, he made three European F2 starts in a Tecno. In 1972, he drove in six of the fourteen European F2 races for Elcom Racing in a Brabham BT38. He finished fifth at Thruxton Circuit but was awarded third-place European F2 points as he was the third of only three European F2 drivers eligible for points to finish the race. Francisci made one European F2 start in 1973 but was then largely away from racing until 2003 when he began racing a Tiga in the Italian Prototype Championship. He raced there from 2003 until 2009.
