= Autódromo Ricardo Mejía =

Defunct motorsport track in Bogotá, Colombia

- Full Circuit (1971–1978)

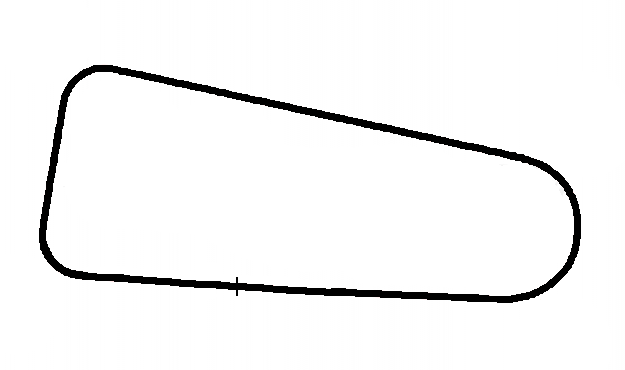
- Oval Circuit (1971–1978)
- Location: Bogotá, Colombia
- Coordinates: 04°46′42″N 74°02′43″W
- Owner: Ricardo Mejía (1971–1978)
- Broke ground: 1970
- Opened: 7 February 1971; 55 years ago
- Closed: 1978
- Former names: Autódromo Internacional de Bogotá

Full Circuit (1971–1978)
- Surface: Concrete
- Length: 3.925 km (2.439 mi)
- Turns: 12
- Race lap record: 1:25.400 ( (Switzerland) Jo Siffert, Chevron B18, 1971, F2)

Oval Circuit (1971–1978)
- Surface: Concrete
- Length: 2.300 km (1.429 mi)
- Turns: 4

Autódromo Ricardo Mejía was a 3.925 km (2.439 mi) motor racing circuit located in Bogotá, Colombia.

The circuit was inaugurated on 7 February 1971 with the Gran Premio República de Colombia, the first track competition held in the country. It hosted various national and international speed and endurance championships, as well as hosting a round of the 1972 American Formula 2 season. Upon its inauguration, the circuit was considered to host a Formula One grand prix, replacing the Mexican Grand Prix, but no deal was finalized. In 1978, after several disagreements between the sports entities of national motorsports and its owner Ricardo Mejía, the circuit was closed. In 1980 parts of the property were acquired for the construction of infrastructure for commercial services.

== Lap records ==
The fastest official race lap records at the Autódromo Ricardo Mejía are listed as:

Category	Time	Driver	Vehicle	Event
Full Circuit (1971–1978): 3.925 km (2.439 mi)
Formula Two	1:25.400	Jo Siffert	Chevron B18	1971 Gran Premio Ciudad de Bogotá
