= Alistair Walker =

English racing driver (1944–2021)

Alistair "Al" Walker (born 21 March 1944 in Dewsbury, Yorkshire – died 25 January 2021 in Dale, Pembrokeshire) was a racing driver from England. He participated in Formula 3, Formula 2, World Championship of Makes, and the South African Springbok Series. After his active racing career was over, he participated in some Historic Racing and restored several significant historic vehicles. In 2004 Alistair bought a WWII RAF Air Sea Rescue boat, one of few survivors of the type, in rough condition and commenced a restoration. The boat was finished in time to represent the RAF Museum in Queen Elizabeth's 2012 Thames Diamond Jubilee Pageant.

== Racing record ==
British F3 Championship Results
Year	Entrant	Chassis	Engine	6	8	9	22	24	Pos.	Pts
1967	Alistair Walker Racing	Brabham BT18	Ford Cosworth MAE 1.0 L4	BRH DNS	SNE 16th	BRH DNS	BRH DNF	OUL DNQ		

Complete European Formula Two Results
Year	Entrant	Chassis	Engine	1	2	3	4	5	6	7	8	9	10	11	12	13	14	15	16	17	18	19	20	21	Pos.	Pts
1968	Alistair Walker Racing	Lola T100	Ford Cosworth FVA 1.6 L4	BAR	HOC	THR 11th	NUR 6th	PAU	JAR	ZOL 9th	PAL NC	HOC 27th	MON DNS	TUL	ZAN 13th	ENN	REI	HOC	ALB	VAL DNS						
1969	Frank Williams Racing	Tecno 69	Ford Cosworth FVA 1.6 L4	THR 17th	HOC 16th	PAU	NUR 13th	JAR DNS	ZOL	HOC	MON	REI	TUL	NUR	ENN	ALB	VAL	MUN								
1970	Alistair Walker Racing	Brabham BT23C	Ford Cosworth FVA 1.6 L4	THR 5th																						
	Alistair Walker Racing	Brabham BT30	Ford Cosworth FVA 1.6 L4		PAU	HOC	BAR	NUR	ZOL	PAL 7th	HOC	MON	ROU	RIC 22nd	NUR 3rd	ENN	SAL	MAN 9th	PHO	TUL 8th	IMO 12th	HOC 27th	MUN	ASH	11th	5
1971	Alistair Walker Racing	Lola T100	Ford Cosworth FVA 1.6 L4	BOG 4th	BOG 10th	MAL	HOC	THR 7th	PAU DNS	NUR DNF	JAR	PAL DNQ	VAL	MON	ROU	IMO	MAN	KIN	BRH	TUL	ALB	HOC	VAL	VAL	20th	1

South African Springbok Championship Series
Year	Entrant	Chassis	Engine	1	2	3	4	5	Pos.	Pts
1969	Alistair Walker Racing	Ferrari 350 P4	Ferrari 4.2 V12	KYA 13th	CAP DNF	LOU 2nd	BUL DNF	ROY DNS		

World Championship of Makes Results
Year	Entrant	Chassis	Engine	1	2	3	4	5	6	7	8	9	10	Pos.	Pts
1970	Ecurie Franchorchamps	Ferrari 512S	Ferrari 5.0 V12	DAY	SEB	BRH	MON	TAR	SPA	NUR	LEM 5th	WAT	ZEL		
