= Gerry Birrell =

British racing driver (1944–1973)

- Born: Gerald Hussey Buchanan Birrell; 30 July 1944 Glasgow, Scotland
- Died: 23 June 1973 (aged 28) Rouen, France
- Relatives: Graham Birrell (brother); Kara Birrell (daughter)
- Years active: 1967–1973

Previous series
- 1967–1968 1969 1970–1973 1970–1973 1972: Formula Vee; Formula Ford; Formula Three; Formula Two; 24 Hours of Le Mans

Gerald Hussey Buchanan Birrell (30 July 1944 – 23 June 1973) was a British racing driver from Scotland, who was killed in a wreck during practice for a Formula Two race at Rouen-Les-Essarts.

Born in Milngavie near Glasgow, Birrell left school when aged 15 to start an apprenticeship with a BMC dealer. He acquired extensive technical experience working as a race mechanic for his elder brother, Graham Birrell. After successfully racing a Singer Chamois 998cc Imp to win Scottish Saloon Car Championships, he started serious racing single seaters at the relatively late age of 24. He began in Formula Vee late in 1967, competing at Ingliston where he led for much of the race before finishing second to Nick Brittan, the leading Formula Vee driver of the time. He moved south and transferred to Formula Ford in 1969, racing against drivers such as Emerson Fittipaldi and James Hunt. He progressed to Formula 3 and Formula 2 in 1970, racing private Brabhams and a Lotus 69. Birrell was also successful in touring cars, mainly in a Ford Capri - taking a Class win in the 1972 24 Hours of Le Mans.

A promising career was ended when he died of unsurvivable injuries in an accident during qualifying for the F2 Trophée D'Europe race at Rouen when a front tyre failed at the notorious Six Frères corner, Birrell's Chevron B25 being thrown into a poorly secured crash barrier. The rail was lifted by the force of the crash, the Chevron passed beneath it, and Birrell died from internal injuries.

At the time of his death, Birrell was having discussions with Tyrrell Racing with a view to joining their Formula One team for the 1974 season.

== Sources ==
- Cooper, Adam (April 2004). "Lost before his time". Motor Sport.
