= Brabham BT36 =

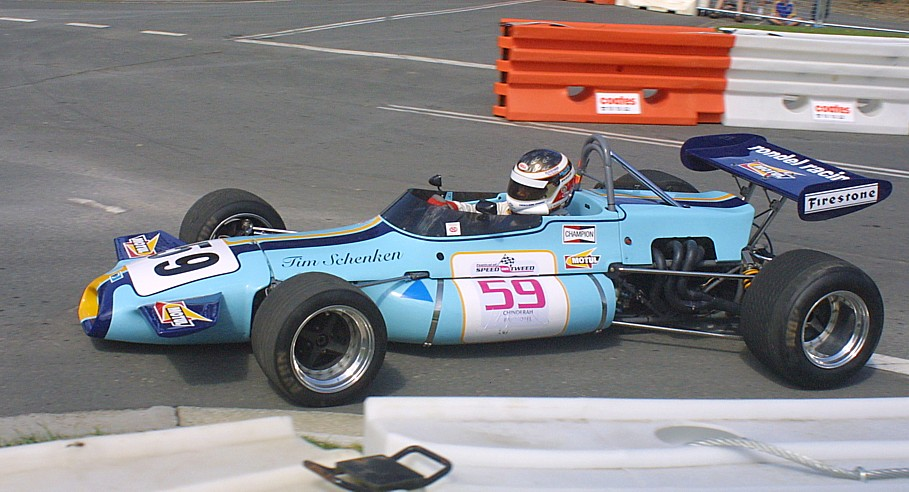
Brabham BT36

The Brabham BT36 was an open-wheel Formula 2 race car, designed by Ron Tauranac, and developed and built by British racing team and constructor, Brabham, for the 1971 European Formula Two Championship. Its best result that season was a second-place finish in the championship for Argentine Carlos Reutemann, despite winning only one race, taking one pole position. His consistency and pace made this possible, scoring six podium finishes, and finishing the season with 40 points. The Brabham BT36 was constructed out of a complex tubular space frame, and was powered by the naturally-aspirated 1.6 L (98 cu in) Ford-FVA Cosworth four-cylinder engine, which produced 220 hp (164 kW), and drove the rear wheels through a 5-speed Hewland F.T.200 manual transmission.
