= European Formula Two Championship =

Formula Two motor racing competitions

- Category: Single seaters
- Country: Europe
- Inaugural season: 1967
- Folded: 1984

The European Formula Two Championship was a Formula Two motor racing series that was held between 1967–84. The races were held across Europe, and were contested both by drivers aiming to compete in Formula One in the future as well as current Formula One drivers wishing to practice. The series was sanctioned by the FIA, motorsport's world governing body.

In order to prevent the series being dominated by Formula One drivers, the grading system was introduced where successful Formula One drivers and recent Formula Two champions were not eligible to score championship points if they competed in a round of the European Formula Two Championship.

Towards the end of the series' life, the number of entrants diminished and declining interest meant that it was replaced by the Formula 3000 class following the 1984 season.

== Champions ==
List of European Formula Two Drivers' Champions
Season	Champion	Team Champion	Car	Ref
1967	(Belgium) Jacky Ickx	(United Kingdom) Tyrrell Racing	Matra-Ford Cosworth	
1968	(France) Jean-Pierre Beltoise	(France) Matra Sports	Matra-Ford Cosworth	
1969	(France) Johnny Servoz-Gavin	(United Kingdom) Matra International	Matra-Ford Cosworth	
1970	(Switzerland) Clay Regazzoni	(Italy) Tecno Racing Team	Tecno-Ford Cosworth	
1971	(Sweden) Ronnie Peterson	(United Kingdom) March Engineering	March-Ford Cosworth	
1972	(United Kingdom) Mike Hailwood	(United Kingdom) Team Surtees	Surtees-Ford Cosworth	
1973	(France) Jean-Pierre Jarier	(United Kingdom) March Engineering	March-BMW	
1974	(France) Patrick Depailler	(United Kingdom) March Engineering	March-BMW	
1975	(France) Jacques Laffite	(France) Ecurie Elf	Martini-BMW	
1976	(France) Jean-Pierre Jabouille	(France) Equipe Elf Switzerland	Elf 2J-Renault	
1977	(France) René Arnoux	(France) Ecurie Renault Elf	Martini-Renault	
1978	(Italy) Bruno Giacomelli	(West Germany) Polifac BMW Junior Team	March-BMW	
1979	(Switzerland) Marc Surer	(West Germany) Polifac BMW Junior Team	March-BMW	
1980	(United Kingdom) Brian Henton	(United Kingdom) Toleman Group	Toleman-Hart	
1981	(United Kingdom) Geoff Lees	(United Kingdom) Ralt Racing Ltd.	Ralt-Honda	
1982	(Italy) Corrado Fabi	(United Kingdom) March Racing Ltd.	March-BMW	
1983	(United Kingdom) Jonathan Palmer	(United Kingdom) Ralt Racing Ltd.	Ralt-Honda	
1984	(New Zealand) Mike Thackwell	(United Kingdom) Ralt Racing Ltd.	Ralt-Honda	
