= Rouen-Les-Essarts =

French race track

Circuit de Rouen-Les-Essarts
- Grand Prix Circuit (1972–1994)
- Location: Orival, France
- Coordinates: 49°19′50.3″N 1°0′16.5″E
- Opened: 30 July 1950; 76 years ago
- Closed: 1994
- Major events: Formula One French Grand Prix (1952, 1957, 1962, 1964, 1968); Grand Prix motorcycle racing French motorcycle Grand Prix (1953, 1965); Sidecar World Championship (1953); Formula 2 (1970–1973, 1975–1978); French F3 (1964–1970, 1972–1973, 1980–1993); French Touring Car Championship

Grand Prix Circuit (1972–1994)
- Surface: Asphalt, cobblestones
- Length: 5.543 km (3.444 mi)
- Turns: 13
- Race lap record: 1:46.310 ( (Brazil) Ingo Hoffmann, March 782, 1978, F2)

Grand Prix Circuit (1955–1971)
- Surface: Asphalt, cobblestones
- Length: 6.542 km (4.065 mi)
- Turns: 12
- Race lap record: 2:00.800 ( (Australia) Tim Schenken, Brabham BT30, 1970, F2)

Original Grand Prix Circuit (1950–1954)
- Surface: Asphalt, cobblestones
- Length: 5.100 km (3.169 mi)
- Turns: 10
- Race lap record: 2:09.900 ( (France) Maurice Trintignant, Ferrari 625, 1954, F1)

Rouen-Les-Essarts was a 5.543 km (3.444 mi) motor racing circuit in Orival, near Rouen, France.

From its opening in 1950, Rouen-Les-Essarts was recognized as one of Europe's finest circuits, with modern pits, a wide track, and spectator grandstands. The street circuit (which ran on public roads) had a few medium straights, a cobbled hairpin turn (Nouveau Monde) at the southernmost tip, and a few blind corners through a wooded hillside The appeal was greatly enhanced by the climb from Nouveau Monde at 56 m (184 ft) to Gresil at 149 m (489 ft), with gradients over 9%.

Rouen hosted five Formula One French Grand Prix races, the last one in 1968 resulting in the tragic burning death of Jo Schlesser, at the fast downhill Six Frères curve. The circuit continued to host major Formula Two events until 1978, after which it was used for various French Championships.

The circuit had a number of different configurations. From its construction in 1950 until 1954 it was 5.100 km (3.169 mi) in length. In 1955 major works increased the circuit's length to 6.542 km (4.065 mi), its most famous configuration. Construction of a new Autoroute across the circuit saw a new section of track built and the length of the circuit reduced to 5.543 km (3.444 mi). Finally, in 1974 a permanent chicane was built at Six Frères and this part of the circuit was renamed Des Roches.

The circuit was closed down in 1994 due to economic and safety reasons, since it is very hard to organize a race on public roads if modern safety standards are to be met. In 1999, following the circuit's closure, all evidence of the area's racing past was demolished, including the grandstands, pits, Armco and track signs. The cobbled Nouveau Monde hairpin was also asphalted but it is still possible to drive around on the original circuit configuration.

The name "Les Essarts" comes from a village, which was included into the commune of Grand-Couronne in 1874.

== Lap records ==
The fastest official race lap records at the Rouen-Les-Essarts are listed as:

Category	Time	Driver	Vehicle	Event	Circuit Map
Grand Prix Circuit (1972–1994): 5.543 km (3.444 mi)
Formula Two	1:46.310	Ingo Hoffmann	March 782	1978 Rouen F2 round	
Group 5	1:47.540	Gérard Larrousse	Lola T280	1972 1000 km of Paris	
Formula Three	1:50.470	Emmanuel Clérico	Dallara F393	1993 Rouen French F3 round	
Formula Renault 2.0	2:01.930	Christophe Tinseau	Orion FR91	1991 Rouen French Formula Renault round	
Grand Prix Circuit (1955–1971): 6.542 km (4.065 mi)
Formula Two	2:00.800	Tim Schenken	Brabham BT30	1970 Rouen F2 round	
Formula One	2:11.400	Jack Brabham	Brabham BT7	1964 French Grand Prix	
Formula Three	2:18.300	Bev Bond	Brabham BT28	1969 Rouen French F3 round	
Formula Junior	2:25.400	Denny Hulme	Brabham BT6	1963 Rouen French Formula Junior round	
Sports car racing	2:28.500	Stirling Moss	Maserati Tipo 60	1959 Rouen Grand Prix	
Grand Prix Circuit (1950–1954): 5.100 km (3.169 mi)
Formula One	2:09.900	Maurice Trintignant	Ferrari 625	1954 Rouen Grand Prix	
Formula Two	2:12.800	Mike Hawthorn	Ferrari Tipo 500	1953 Rouen Grand Prix	
500cc	2:18.300	Reg Armstrong	Gilera Saturno	1953 French motorcycle Grand Prix	
350cc	2:22.900	Ray Amm	Norton Kneeler	1953 French motorcycle Grand Prix	
Sidecar	2:34.100	Eric Oliver	Norton Manx	1953 French motorcycle Grand Prix	
Sports car racing	2:36.500	Louis Rosier	Talbot T26GS	1950 Rouen Grand Prix	
