= List of Pau Grand Prix winners =

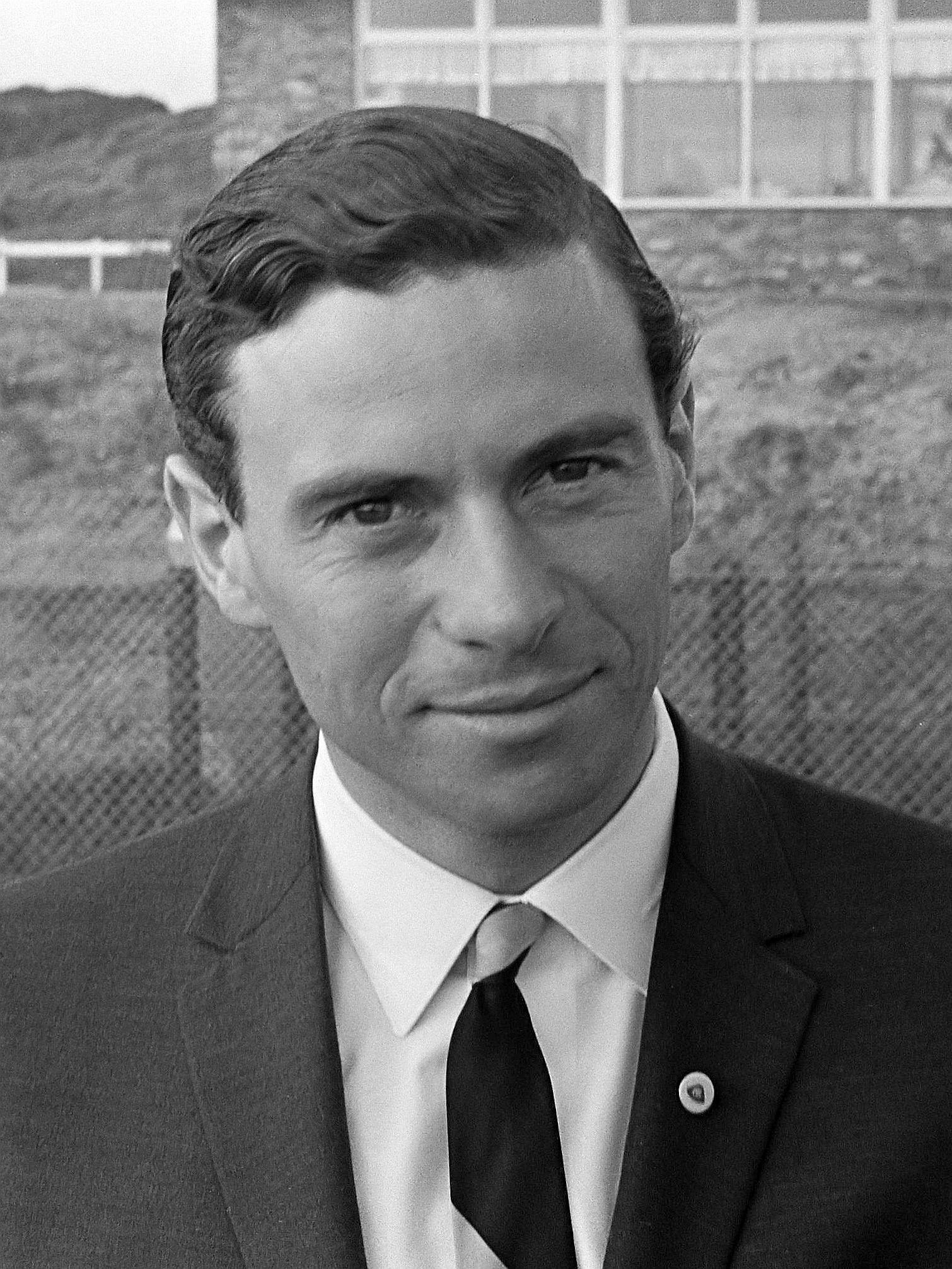
Jim Clark won the Pau Grand Prix four times, more than any other driver.

The Pau Grand Prix (French: Grand Prix de Pau) is an annual championship automobile road event for single seater racing cars organised by the L'Automobile Club Basco-Béarnais (ACBB) on the Circuit de Pau-Ville closed city street track in the centre of Pau, a commune in the Pyrénées-Atlantiques department of southwestern France. The ACBB was first inspired to hold the race in 1933 after the success of the Monaco Grand Prix, as well as other races in Nice and Nîmes. It has been variously run to Formula One, Formula Two, Formula Three (F3), Formula 4 (F4), Formula 3000, Formula Libre, Formula Renault, Grand Prix and touring car rules throughout its history. The Grand Prix consists of three short-distance races, each having one more lap to complete after the time limit has elapsed: two 20-minute races on Saturday and a third 30-minute race, the Pau Grand Prix, contested the following day. Each winner receives a trophy at an awards ceremony following the conclusion of each of the three events, with the third race determining the Pau Grand Prix winner.

As of the 2023 edition, there have been 64 race winners in the 80 editions of the Grand Prix. The inaugural winner was French driver Marcel Lehoux driving a Bugatti in 1933. Jim Clark of Great Britain is the most successful driver at the event, having achieved four victories in 1961, 1963, 1964 and 1965. French racers Jean Behra and Maurice Trintignant and Austria's Jochen Rindt are all in second position with three victories each. Nello Pagani of Italy was the first driver to achieve consecutive victories when he won the 1947 and 1948 races. Australian driver Jack Brabham holds the records for the longest time between two victories as well as his first and last wins–six years between the 1960 and 1966. It has been won by French drivers on 26 occasions, followed by Italian racers with 13 victories and British drivers with 12 wins. Signature is the most successful team with seven victories, ahead of Team Lotus with five wins and Carlin, Prema Powerteam, Scuderia Ferrari with four victories each. The most recent winner was French racer Enzo Peugeot of the FFSA Academy team at the 2023 F4 event.

== Winners ==
Key
*	Denotes multiple races were held over the race weekend with the final one being the Pau Grand Prix
†	Winner of the FIA WTCC Race of France's first event
‡	Winner of the FIA WTCC Race of France's second event

Series abbreviations (part 1)
British F3	British Formula 3 International Series
Euroformula	Euroformula Open Championship
Euro F2	European Formula Two Championship
Euro F3	FIA Formula 3 European Championship
Euro F3 Cup	FIA European Formula 3 Cup
Euro F3000	European Formula 3000 Championship
F1 (NC)	Non-championship Formula One
F2	Formula Two

Series abbreviations (part 2)
F3 Euro Series	Formula 3 Euro Series
F3 Intl Trophy	FIA Formula 3 International Trophy
French F3	French Formula Three Championship
French F4	French F4 Championship
FFSA	FFSA Trophées de France
GP	Grand Prix
Intl F3000	International Formula 3000
WTCC	World Touring Car Championship

Winners of the Pau Grand Prix by year
Year	Nationality	Winner	Entrant	Model	Category	Series	Ref
1933	France	Marcel Lehoux	Marcel Lehoux	Bugatti Type 51	Formula Libre	GP	
1934	Not held						
1935	Italy	Tazio Nuvolari	Scuderia Ferrari	Alfa Romeo Tipo B P3	Formula Libre	GP	
1936	France	Philippe Étancelin	Philippe Étancelin	Maserati V8RI	Formula Libre	GP	
1937	France	Jean-Pierre Wimille	Automobiles Bugatti	Bugatti Type 59/57S	Sports car	GP	
1938	France	René Dreyfus	Ecurie Bleue	Delahaye Type 145	Grand Prix	GP	
1939	Germany	Hermann Lang	Daimler-Benz AG	Mercedes-Benz W154/39	Grand Prix	GP	
1940–1946	Not held as a result of the Second World War						
1947	Italy	Nello Pagani	Scuderia Milano	Maserati 4CL	Formula One	F1 (NC)	
1948	Italy	Nello Pagani	Enrico Platé	Maserati 4CL	Formula One	F1 (NC)	
1949	Argentina	Juan Manuel Fangio	Automóvil Club Argentino	Maserati 4CLT/48	Formula One	F1 (NC)	
1950	Argentina	Juan Manuel Fangio	Scuderia Achille Varzi	Maserati 4CLT/48	Formula One	F1 (NC)	
1951	Italy	Luigi Villoresi	Scuderia Ferrari	Ferrari 375	Formula One	F1 (NC)	
1952	Italy	Alberto Ascari	Scuderia Ferrari	Ferrari Tipo 500	Formula Two	F1 (NC)	
1953	Italy	Alberto Ascari	Scuderia Ferrari	Ferrari Tipo 500	Formula Two	F1 (NC)	
1954	France	Jean Behra	Équipe Gordini	Gordini T16	Formula One	F1 (NC)	
1955	France	Jean Behra	Officine Alfieri Maserati	Maserati 250F	Formula One	F1 (NC)	
1956	Not held due to the French authorities ordering that safety improvements be made to the circuit in response to the 1955 Le Mans disaster						
1957	France	Jean Behra	Officine Alfieri Maserati	Maserati 250F	Formula One	F1 (NC)	
1958	France	Maurice Trintignant	Rob Walker Racing Team	Cooper T43-Climax	Formula Two	F2	
1959	France	Maurice Trintignant	Rob Walker Racing Team	Cooper T51-Climax	Formula Two	F2	
1960	Australia	Jack Brabham	Equipe Sunbeam	Cooper T45-Climax	Formula Two	F2	
1961	United Kingdom	Jim Clark	Team Lotus	Lotus 18-Climax	Formula One	F1 (NC)	
1962	France	Maurice Trintignant	Rob Walker Racing Team	Lotus 18/21-Climax	Formula One	F1 (NC)	
1963	United Kingdom	Jim Clark	Team Lotus	Lotus 25-Climax	Formula One	F1 (NC)	
1964	United Kingdom	Jim Clark	Ron Harris Team Lotus	Lotus 32-Cosworth	Formula Two	FFSA	
1965	United Kingdom	Jim Clark	Ron Harris Team Lotus	Lotus 35-Cosworth	Formula Two	FFSA	
1966	Australia	Jack Brabham	Brabham Racing Organisation	Brabham BT18-Honda	Formula Two	FFSA	
1967	Austria	Jochen Rindt	Roy Winkelmann Racing	Brabham BT23-Cosworth	Formula Two	FFSA	
1968	United Kingdom	Jackie Stewart	Matra International	Matra MS7-Cosworth	Formula Two	No series	
1969	Austria	Jochen Rindt	Roy Winkelmann Racing	Lotus 59-Cosworth	Formula Two	No series	
1970	Austria	Jochen Rindt	Jochen Rindt Racing	Lotus 69-Cosworth	Formula Two	No series	
1971	Sweden	Reine Wisell	LIRA Team Lotus	Lotus 69-Cosworth	Formula Two	FFSA	
1972 *	United Kingdom	Peter Gethin	Chevron Racing Team	Chevron B20-Ford	Formula Two	Euro F2	
1973 *	France	François Cevert	Elf John Coombs	Alpine A367-Ford	Formula Two	Euro F2	
1974	France	Patrick Depailler	March Racing Team	March 742-BMW	Formula Two	Euro F2	
1975	France	Jacques Laffite	Automobiles Martini	Martini MK16-BMW	Formula Two	Euro F2	
1976	France	René Arnoux	Automobiles Martini	Martini MK19-Renault	Formula Two	Euro F2	
1977	France	René Arnoux	Écurie Renault Elf	Martini MK22-Renault	Formula Two	Euro F2	
1978	Italy	Bruno Giacomelli	Polifac BMW Junior Team	March 782-BMW	Formula Two	Euro F2	
1979	United States	Eddie Cheever	Osella Squadra Corse	Osella FA2/79-BMW	Formula Two	Euro F2	
1980	France	Richard Dallest	Ecurie Motul GPA	AGS JH17-BMW	Formula Two	Euro F2	
1981	United Kingdom	Geoff Lees	Ralt Racing	Ralt RH6/80-Honda	Formula Two	Euro F2	
1982	Venezuela	Johnny Cecotto	March Racing	March 822-BMW	Formula Two	Euro F2	
1983	Austria	Jo Gartner (Note: Original race winner Alain Ferté was disqualified for driving an underweight car.)	Emco Sports	Spirit 201-BMW	Formula Two	Euro F2	
1984	New Zealand	Mike Thackwell	Ralt Racing	Ralt RH6/84-Honda	Formula Two	Euro F2	
1985	Germany	Christian Danner	BS Automotive	March 85B-Cosworth	Formula 3000	Euro F3000	
1986	New Zealand	Mike Thackwell	Ralt Racing	Ralt RT20-Honda	Formula 3000	Intl F3000	
1987	France	Yannick Dalmas	Oreca Motorsport	March 87B-Cosworth	Formula 3000	Intl F3000	
1988	Brazil	Roberto Moreno	Bromley Motorsport	Reynard 88D-Cosworth	Formula 3000	Intl F3000	
1989	France	Jean Alesi	Eddie Jordan Racing	Reynard 89D-Mugen	Formula 3000	Intl F3000	
1990	Belgium	Eric van de Poele	GA Motorsport	Reynard 90D-Cosworth	Formula 3000	Intl F3000	
1991	France	Jean-Marc Gounon	3001 International	Ralt RT23-Cosworth	Formula 3000	Intl F3000	
1992	Italy	Emanuele Naspetti	Forti Corse	Reynard 92D-Cosworth	Formula 3000	Intl F3000	
1993	Portugal	Pedro Lamy	Crypton Engineering	Reynard 92D-Cosworth	Formula 3000	Intl F3000	
1994	Brazil	Gil de Ferran	Paul Stewart Racing	Reynard 94D-Zytek Judd	Formula 3000	Intl F3000	
1995	Italy	Vincenzo Sospiri	Super Nova Racing	Reynard 95D-Cosworth	Formula 3000	Intl F3000	
1996	Germany	Jörg Müller	RSM Marko	Lola T96/50-Zytek	Formula 3000	Intl F3000	
1997	Colombia	Juan Pablo Montoya	RSM Marko	Lola T96/50-Zytek	Formula 3000	Intl F3000	
1998	Colombia	Juan Pablo Montoya	Super Nova Racing	Lola T96/50-Zytek	Formula 3000	Intl F3000	
1999 *	France	Benoît Tréluyer	Signature	Dallara F399-Renault Sodemo	Formula Three	Euro F3 Cup	
2000	France	Jonathan Cochet	Signature Team	Dallara F399-Renault Sodemo	Formula Three	Euro F3 Cup	
2000	France	Jonathan Cochet	Signature Team	Dallara F399-Renault Sodemo	Formula Three	French F3	
2001	United Kingdom	Anthony Davidson	Carlin Motorsport	Dallara F301-Mugen-Honda	Formula Three	Euro F3 Cup	
2002	France	Renaud Derlot	Signature Team	Dallara F302-Renault Sodemo	Formula Three	Euro F3 Cup	
2002	France	Renaud Derlot	Signature Team	Dallara F302-Renault Sodemo	Formula Three	French F3	
2003 *	Brazil	Fábio Carbone	Signature Team	Dallara F302-Sodemo Renault	Formula Three	Euro F3 Cup	
2003 *	Brazil	Fábio Carbone	Signature Team	Dallara F302-Sodemo Renault	Formula Three	F3 Euro Series	
2004 *	France	Nicolas Lapierre	Signature Team	Dallara F304-Opel Spiess	Formula Three	F3 Euro Series	
2005 *	United Kingdom	Lewis Hamilton	ASM Formule 3	Dallara F305-Mercedes-Benz	Formula Three	F3 Euro Series	
2006 *	France	Romain Grosjean	Signature-Plus	Dallara F305-Mercedes-Benz	Formula Three	British F3	
2007	Switzerland	Alain Menu †	Chevrolet RML	Chevrolet Lacetti	Touring car	WTCC	
2007	Brazil	Augusto Farfus ‡	BMW Team Germany	BMW 320si	Touring car	WTCC	
2008	Brazil	Augusto Farfus †	BMW Team Germany	BMW 320si	Touring car	WTCC	
2008	United Kingdom	Andy Priaulx ‡	BMW Team UK	BMW 320si	Touring car	WTCC	
2009	United Kingdom	Rob Huff †	Chevrolet	Chevrolet Cruze	Touring car	WTCC	
2009	Switzerland	Alain Menu ‡	Chevrolet	Chevrolet Cruze	Touring car	WTCC	
2010	Not held due to financial difficulty						
2011	Germany	Marco Wittmann	Signature	Dallara F308-Volkswagen	Formula Three	F3 Intl Trophy	
2012 *	Italy	Raffaele Marciello	Prema Powerteam	Dallara F312-Mercedes-Benz	Formula Three	British F3	
2012 *	Italy	Raffaele Marciello	Prema Powerteam	Dallara F312-Mercedes-Benz	Formula Three	Euro F3	
2013	Italy	Luca Ghiotto	Prema Powerteam	Tatuus FR2.0/13-Renault	Formula Renault	No series	
2014 *	Sweden	Felix Rosenqvist	Mücke Motorsport	Dallara F312-Mercedes-Benz	Formula Three	Euro F3	
2015 *	Italy	Antonio Giovinazzi	Jagonya Ayam with Carlin	Dallara F315-Volkswagen	Formula Three	Euro F3	
2016 *	Italy	Alessio Lorandi	Carlin	Dallara F315-Volkswagen	Formula Three	Euro F3	
2017 *	Germany	Maximilian Günther	Prema Powerteam	Dallara F316-Mercedes-Benz	Formula Three	Euro F3	
2018 *	Estonia	Ralf Aron	Prema Powerteam	Dallara F317-Mercedes-Benz	Formula Three	Euro F3	
2019 *	United Kingdom	Billy Monger	Carlin	Dallara F317-Volkswagen	Formula Three	Euroformula	
2020–2021	Not held as a result of the COVID-19 pandemic in France						
2022 *	France	Vladislav Lomko	CryptoTower Racing	Dallara 320-HWA	Formula Three	Euroformula	
2023 *	France	Enzo Peugeot	FFSA Academy	Mygale M21-F4-Alpine	Formula 4	French F4	
2024	Not held because of budget issues and problems of decarbonising the event						
2025	Not held because of financial trouble						

== Records ==
=== By driver ===
Multiple wins by driver (Note: Table information sourced from the references listed below.)
Name	Wins	Years
Jim Clark	4	1961, 1963, 1964, 1965
Jean Behra	3	1954, 1955, 1957
Jochen Rindt	3	1967, 1969, 1970
Maurice Trintignant	3	1958, 1959, 1962
René Arnoux	2	1976, 1977
Alberto Ascari	2	1952, 1953
Jack Brabham	2	1960, 1966
Juan Manuel Fangio	2	1949, 1950
Augusto Farfus	2	2007, 2008
Alain Menu	2	2007, 2009
Juan Pablo Montoya	2	1997, 1998
Nello Pagani	2	1947, 1948
Mike Thackwell	2	1984, 1986

=== By nationality ===
Victories by nationality
Nationality	Wins	Drivers
France	26	21
Italy	13	11
United Kingdom	12	9
Germany	5	5
Brazil	5	4
Austria	4	2
Sweden	2	2
Argentina	2	1
Australia	2	1
Colombia	2	1
New Zealand	2	1
Switzerland	2	1
Belgium	1	1
Estonia	1	1
Portugal	1	1
United States	1	1
Venezuela	1	1

=== By entrant ===
Wins by entrant
Entrant	Wins	Drivers
Signature	7	7
Team Lotus	5	3
Carlin	4	4
Prema Powerteam	4	4
Scuderia Ferrari	4	3
Chevrolet	3	2
Ralt Racing	3	2
Rob Walker Racing Team	3	1
Automobiles Martini	2	2
March Racing	2	2
RSM Marko	2	2
Super Nova Racing	2	2
BMW Team Germany	2	1
Officine Alfieri Maserati	2	1
Roy Winkelmann Racing	2	1
3001 International	1	1
ASM Formule 3	1	1
Automobiles Bugatti	1	1
Automóvil Club Argentino	1	1
BMW Team UK	1	1
Brabham Racing Organisation	1	1
Bromley Motorsport	1	1
BS Automotive	1	1
Chevron Racing Team	1	1
Crypton Engineering	1	1
CryptoTower Racing	1	1
Daimler-Benz AG	1	1
Ecurie Bleue	1	1
Ecurie Motul GPA	1	1
Écurie Renault Elf	1	1
Eddie Jordan Racing	1	1
Elf John Coombs	1	1
Emco Sports	1	1
Enrico Platé	1	1
Équipe Gordini	1	1
Equipe Sunbeam	1	1
FFSA Academy	1	1
Forti Corse	1	1
GA Motorsport	1	1
Jochen Rindt Racing	1	1
Marcel Lehoux	1	1
Matra International	1	1
Mücke Motorsport	1	1
Oreca Motorsport	1	1
Osella Squadra Corse	1	1
Paul Stewart Racing	1	1
Philippe Étancelin	1	1
Polifac BMW Junior Team	1	1
Scuderia Achille Varzi	1	1
Scuderia Milano	1	1

== Bibliography ==
- Georgano, G. N.; R. Bochroch, Albert, eds. (1971). The Encyclopedia of Motor Sport. New York City, United States: Viking Press. ISBN 978-0-670-29405-3 – via Open Library.
- Twite, M. L. (1971). The World's Racing Cars (Fourth ed.). Garden City, New York: Doubleday & Company, Inc. LCCN 75154706 – via Open Library.
- Henry, Alan (1984). Ferrari: The Grand Prix Cars. Richmond, Surrey: Hazleton Publishing. ISBN 0-905138-30-9 – via Open Library.
- Cimarosti, Adriano (1990). McKinney, David (ed.). The Complete History of Grand Prix Motor Racing. New York City, United States: Crescent Books. ISBN 0-517-69709-2 – via Open Library.
- Henry, Alan (1990). Jochen Rindt. Richmond, Surrey: Hazleton Publishing. ISBN 0-905138-79-1 – via Open Library.
- Higham, Peter (1995). "Pau". The Guinness Guide to International Motor Racing. London, England: Motorbooks International. ISBN 978-0-7603-0152-4 – via Open Library.
