= 1983 Pau Grand Prix =

Race details
- Date: 22 May 1983
- Official name: XLIII Pau Grand Prix
- Location: Pau, France
- Course: Temporary Street Circuit
- Course length: 2.760 km (1.720 miles)
- Distance: 73 laps, 206.882 km (128.550 miles)
- Weather: Rain

Pole position
Driver	(Germany) Stefan Bellof	Maurer-BMW
- Time: 1:11.87

Fastest lap
Driver	(Germany) Stefan Bellof	Maurer-BMW
- Time: 1:13.12

Podium
First	(Austria) Jo Gartner	Spirit-BMW
Second	(United Kingdom) Kenny Acheson	Maurer-BMW
Third	(United Kingdom) Jonathan Palmer	Ralt-Honda

The 1983 Pau Grand Prix was a Formula Two motor race held on 22 May 1983 at the Pau circuit, in Pau, Pyrénées-Atlantiques, France. After initially winning the Grand Prix, Alain Ferté, as well as his teammate, Stefan Bellof were disqualified after their cars were found to be underweight. This therefore handed the win to Jo Gartner. Kenny Acheson finished second and Jonathan Palmer third.

== Classification ==
=== Race ===
Pos	No	Driver	Vehicle	Laps	Time/Retired	Grid
1	24	(Austria) Jo Gartner	Spirit-BMW	73	1hr 45min 18.65sec	6
2	17	(United Kingdom) Kenny Acheson	Maurer-BMW	73	+ 25.91 s	13
3	8	(United Kingdom) Jonathan Palmer	Ralt-Honda	73	+ 53.96 s	11
4	3	(Belgium) Thierry Tassin	March-BMW	73	+ 1:05.93 s	8
5	2	(Germany) Christian Danner	March-BMW	73	+ 1:06.24 s	9
6	12	(Switzerland) Rolf Biland	March-BMW	69	+ 4 laps	18
7	36	(Italy) Fulvio Ballabio	AGS-BMW	67	+ 6 laps	16
8	9	(New Zealand) Mike Thackwell	Ralt-Honda	67	+ 6 laps	2
9	15	(Sweden) Tomas Kaiser	Maurer-BMW	66	+ 7 laps	19
10	7	(France) Philippe Streiff	AGS-BMW	63	+ 10 laps	5
DSQ	5	(France) Alain Ferté	Maurer-BMW	73	Disqualified	3
DSQ	4	(Germany) Stefan Bellof	Maurer-BMW	73	Disqualified	1
Ret	26	(France) Philippe Alliot	Martini-BMW	59	Engine	10
Ret	18	(Italy) Guido Daccò	Lola-BMW	30	Accident	20
Ret	1	(Italy) Beppe Gabbiani	March-BMW	29	Driveshaft	4
Ret	28	(Italy) Lamberto Leoni	March-BMW	28	Accident	15
Ret	20	(France) Richard Dallest	March-BMW	28	Accident	12
Ret	25	(Austria) "Pierre Chauvet"	Spirit-BMW	24	Accident	14
Ret	6	(France) Pierre Petit	Maurer-BMW	18	Accident	17
Ret	10	(Italy) Alessandro Nannini	Minardi-BMW	0	Accident	7
DNQ	19	(Italy) Aldo Bertuzzi	March-BMW		Did Not Start	
DNQ	33	(United Kingdom) Dave Scott	March-BMW		Did Not Start	
DNQ	34	(Italy) Roberto Del Castello	March-BMW		Did Not Start	
DNQ	35	(France) Michel Ferté	Martini-BMW		Did Not Start	
Fastest Lap: Stefan Bellof (Maurer-BMW) - 1:13.12

Preceded by 1982 Pau Grand Prix	Pau Grand Prix; 1983	Succeeded by 1984 Pau Grand Prix
