= 1960 Pau Grand Prix =

Race details
- Date: 18 April 1960
- Official name: XX Pau Grand Prix
- Location: Pau, France
- Course: Temporary Street Circuit
- Course length: 2.760 km (1.720 miles)
- Distance: 90 laps, 248.400 km (154.348 miles)

Pole position
Driver	(Australia) Jack Brabham	Cooper T45
- Time: 1:34.0

Fastest lap
Driver	(France) Maurice Trintignant	Cooper T45
- Time: 1:35.3

Podium
First	(Australia) Jack Brabham	Cooper T45
Second	(France) Maurice Trintignant	Cooper T45
Third	(Belgium) Olivier Gendebien	Porsche 718

The 1960 Pau Grand Prix was a Formula Two motor race held on 18 April 1960 at the Pau circuit, in Pau, Pyrénées-Atlantiques, France. The Grand Prix was won by Jack Brabham, driving the Cooper T45. Maurice Trintignant finished second and Olivier Gendebien third.

The race was the third event in the 1960 Formula Two Constructors' Championship and Formula Two Drivers' Championship.

== Entries ==
All but three cars entered were Coopers. As regular drivers Jo Bonnier and Graham Hill were racing for BRM at Goodwood Circuit, Porsche sent just one car for Olivier Gendebien who was expected to be a front runner. Cooper also sent just a single works car, for Jack Brabham. Amongst the several privately entered Coopers were Ron Flockhart driving for Ken Tyrrell, Maurice Trintignant driving for Centro Sud, and Pau regular Jackie Lewis. There were also two privately entered Lotuses.

== Practice ==
Near the start of the first practice session, on a drying track, Lewis was fastest with 1 minute 35.8, and Gendebien not far behind. Brabham instead focussed on setup, while Trintignant struggled with poor handling, continuing to change springs and shock absorbers even into the second session.

Ultimately, in the second session Brabham went fastest on the now dry track with 1 minute 34 seconds, with only Trintignant able to come close. Gendebien was able to set third fastest time but dropped a valve in the process, and was two seconds slower than Brabham.

The final grid had Brabham, Trintignant and Gendebien, followed by Lewis and Flockhart on row two.

== Report ==
At the start Brabham immediately took the lead, followed by Trintignant, Gendebien, Lewis, Flockhart, John Campbell-Jones, and Masten Gregory. Brabham steadily increased his lead over Trintignant by around a second per lap when on the sixth lap he had a minor accident, clipping a straw bale with his rear wheel causing minor handling damage. This delay allowed Trintignant to catch up, urged on by the partisan French crowd. Trintignant's engine was underpowered compared with Brabham's, but now due to the damage on Brabham's car the two drivers began a nose-to-tail battle which would last the entire race. The two cars were never more than a few lengths apart, but Trintignant was never able to cleanly overtake, only managing to sometimes overlap in his efforts to take the lead.

Behind the two leaders Gendebien steadily fell back, knowing he would not be able to challenge the pace of the two leaders, hoping that their fierce battle would take the two Coopers out. For much of the race Lewis stayed not far behind Gendebien, hoping to eventually overtake depending on how the race progressed. However, on his 26th lap his gear lever broke, forcing him to make two lengthy stops, dropping him to last place although he would eventually be classified a finisher. Behind Gendebien, Flockhart lapped steadily, fast enough to maintain fourth place, but not enough to challenge for third. Campbell-Jones ran fifth for some time but radiator trouble meant he had to make several pitstops, dropping him back and allowing Tony Marsh into fifth ahead of Paul Frère.

The order near the front remained the same for over half the race. Brabham and Trintignant first lapped Gendebien on lap 55, and then on his final lap Brabham was able to lap Gendebien again, who split the lead two cars at the end of the race.

== Classification ==
=== Race ===
Pos	No	Driver	Vehicle	Laps	Time/Retired	Grid
1	4	(Australia) Jack Brabham	Cooper T45-Climax	90	2hr 24min 51.8sec	1
2	2	(France) Maurice Trintignant	Cooper T45-Climax	90	+ 1.5 s	2
3	6	(Belgium) Olivier Gendebien	Porsche 718	88	+ 2 laps	3
4	10	(United Kingdom) Ron Flockhart	Cooper T45-Climax	88	+ 2 laps	5
5	22	(United Kingdom) Tony Marsh	Cooper T45-Climax	87	+ 3 laps	3
6	14	(Belgium) Paul Frère	Cooper T51-Climax	87	+ 3 laps	16
7	12	(United Kingdom) Bob Hicks	Lotus 16-Climax	87	+ 3 laps	9
8	28	(United Kingdom) John Campbell-Jones	Cooper T45-Climax	84	+ 6 laps	8
9	34	(France) Bernard Collomb	Cooper T45-Climax	82	+ 8 laps	14
10	26	(France) Jo Schlesser	Cooper T43-Climax	82	+ 8 laps	15
11	16	(Belgium) Lucien Bianchi	Cooper T51-Climax	82	+ 8 laps	10
12	20	(United Kingdom) Jackie Lewis	Cooper T45-Climax	78	+ 12 laps	4
Ret	18	(Germany) Wolfgang Seidel	Cooper T43-Climax	29	Gearbox	13
Ret	36	(United Kingdom) Marcus Niven	Lotus 12-Climax	27	Rear suspension	12
Ret	8	(United States) Masten Gregory	Cooper T51-Maserati	14	Overheating	11
DNA	24	(Portugal) Mario de Araujo Cabral	Cooper T45-Maserati		Withdrawn	
DNA	30	(Switzerland) Maurice Caillet	Lotus 18-Maserati 150S		Withdrawn	
DNA	32	(United Kingdom) Tom Threlfall	Cooper T43-Climax		Withdrawn	

Preceded by 1959 Pau Grand Prix	Pau Grand Prix; 1960	Succeeded by 1961 Pau Grand Prix
Preceded by 1960 Brussels Grand Prix	1960 Formula Two Championship; Round 3	Succeeded by 1960 Aintree 200
