= 1958 Pau Grand Prix =

Race details
- Date: 7 April 1958
- Official name: XVIII Pau Grand Prix
- Location: Pau, France
- Course: Temporary Street Circuit
- Course length: 2.760 km (1.720 miles)
- Distance: 50 laps, 138.000 km (85.749 miles)

Pole position
Driver	(Italy) Giulio Cabianca	O.S.C.A. F2

Fastest lap
Driver	(France) Maurice Trintignant	Cooper T43
- Time: 1:38.4

Podium
First	(France) Maurice Trintignant	Cooper T43
Second	(Brazil) Hermano da Silva Ramos	Cooper T45
Third	(Italy) Giulio Cabianca	O.S.C.A. F2

The 1958 Pau Grand Prix was a Formula Two motor race held on 7 April 1958 at the Pau circuit, in Pau, Pyrénées-Atlantiques, France. The Grand Prix was won by Maurice Trintignant, driving the Cooper T43. Hermano da Silva Ramos finished second and Giulio Cabianca third.

== Classification ==
=== Race ===
Pos	No	Driver	Vehicle	Laps	Time/Retired	Grid
1	2	(France) Maurice Trintignant	Cooper T43	50	1hr 26min 40.6sec	3
2	10	(Brazil) Hermano da Silva Ramos	Cooper T45	50	+ 1:50.4 s	2
3	6	(Italy) Giulio Cabianca	O.S.C.A. F2	49	+ 1 lap	1
4	24	(New Zealand) Ronnie Moore	Cooper T43	48	+ 2 laps	5
5	8	(France) Auguste Veuillet	Porsche 1500RS	48	+ 2 laps	7
6	4	(Switzerland) Heinz Schiller	Porsche 1500RS	48	+ 2 laps	6
7	12	(United Kingdom) Bill Frost	Lotus 11	47	+ 3 laps	10
8	30	(France) Paul Armagnac (France) Robert Mougin	DB	45	+ 5 laps	12
9	14	(France) Jacques Cales	Gordini T15	42	+ 8 laps	9
10	16	(United Kingdom) David Latchford	Halseylec	40	+ 10 laps	11
Ret	26	(New Zealand) Raymond Thackwell	Cooper T43	15	Gearbox	4
Ret	18	(United Kingdom) Ken Tyrrell	Cooper T43	13	Half-shaft	8
DNA	20	(Italy) Conte Roberto Lippi	Stanguellini		Did Not Attend	
DNA	22	(United States) George Smith	Cooper T43		Did Not Attend	
DNA	28	(Portugal) Luís de Sttau Monteiro	Cooper T43		Did Not Attend	
DNA	32	(Sweden) Jon Fast	O.S.C.A. MT4		Did Not Attend	
DNA	12	(Belgium) Christian Goethals	Cooper T43		Did Not Attend	
DNA	30	(France) Marceau Hauret	Cooper T43		Did Not Attend	

Preceded by 1957 Pau Grand Prix	Pau Grand Prix; 1958	Succeeded by 1959 Pau Grand Prix
