= 1959 Pau Grand Prix =

Race details
- Date: 18 May 1959
- Official name: XIX Pau Grand Prix
- Location: Pau, France
- Course: Temporary Street Circuit
- Course length: 2.760 km (1.720 miles)
- Distance: 80 laps, 112.691 km (85.749 miles)

Pole position
Driver	(France) Maurice Trintignant	Cooper T51
- Time: 1:35.6

Fastest lap
Driver	(France) Jean Behra	Behra-Porsche
- Time: 1:36.8

Podium
First	(France) Maurice Trintignant	Cooper T51
Second	(New Zealand) Bruce McLaren	Cooper T45
Third	(Belgium) Lucien Bianchi	Cooper T51

The 1959 Pau Grand Prix was a Formula Two motor race held on 18 May 1959 at the Pau circuit, in Pau, Pyrénées-Atlantiques, France. The Grand Prix was won by Maurice Trintignant for the second year in a row, driving the Cooper T51. Bruce McLaren finished second and Lucien Bianchi third.

== Classification ==
=== Race ===
Pos	No	Driver	Vehicle	Laps	Time/Retired	Grid
1	2	(France) Maurice Trintignant	Cooper T43	80	2hr 23min 34.5sec	1
2	8	(New Zealand) Bruce McLaren	Cooper T45	80	+ 1:14.8 s	3
3	18	(Belgium) Lucien Bianchi	Cooper T51	80	+ 1:31.6 s	8
4	26	(United Kingdom) Tony Marsh	Cooper T45	79	+ 1 lap	9
5	28	(France) Jean Behra	Behra-Porsche	79	+ 1 lap	2
6	24	(United Kingdom) Henry Taylor	Cooper T51	79	+ 1 lap	9
7	22	(United Kingdom) Jackie Lewis	Cooper T45	78	+ 2 laps	4
8	10	(United States) Harry Schell	Porsche RSK	78	+ 2 laps	11
9	40	(United Kingdom) Keith Greene	Cooper T43	78	+ 2 laps	12
10	34	(United Kingdom) John Campbell-Jones	Cooper T43	77	+ 3 laps	17
11	20	(Belgium) Alain de Changy	Cooper T51	76	+ 4 laps	10
12	32	(United Kingdom) Bob Hicks	Lotus 12	73	+ 7 laps	18
Ret	38	(United Kingdom) Norman Barclay	Cooper T45	39	Accident	16
Ret	16	(Italy) Giulio Cabianca	O.S.C.A. F2	27	Retired	14
Ret	6	(United States) Masten Gregory	Cooper T45	25	Crown wheel + pinion	6
Ret	36	(Belgium) Christian Goethals	Porsche RSK	21	Retired	13
Ret	4	(Australia) Jack Brabham	Cooper T45	14	Magneto	5
Ret	14	(Italy) Gino Munaron	O.S.C.A. F2	9	Retired	20
Ret	30	(Netherlands) Carel Godin de Beaufort	Porsche RSK	3	Retired	15
Ret	12	(Germany) Wolfgang Seidel	Porsche RSK	0	Retired	19

Preceded by 1958 Pau Grand Prix	Pau Grand Prix; 1959	Succeeded by 1960 Pau Grand Prix
