= 1982 Pau Grand Prix =

Race details
- Date: 31 May 1982
- Official name: XLII Pau Grand Prix
- Location: Pau, France
- Course: Temporary Street Circuit
- Course length: 2.760 km (1.720 miles)
- Distance: 73 laps, 206.882 km (128.550 miles)

Pole position
Driver	(Belgium) Thierry Boutsen	Spirit-Honda
- Time: 1:11.23

Fastest lap
Driver	(United Kingdom) Kenny Acheson	Ralt-Honda
- Time: 1:12.37

Podium
First	(Venezuela) Johnny Cecotto	March-BMW
Second	(Belgium) Thierry Boutsen	Spirit-Honda
Third	(New Zealand) Mike Thackwell	March-BMW

The 1982 Pau Grand Prix was a Formula Two motor race held on 31 May 1982 at the Pau circuit, in Pau, Pyrénées-Atlantiques, France. The Grand Prix was won by Johnny Cecotto, driving the March 822. Thierry Boutsen finished second and Mike Thackwell third.

After leading much of the race, Corrado Fabi retired leaving Thierry Boutsen and a charging Johnny Cecotto as the two front-runners in the final laps. Eventually, Cecotto passed Boutsen for the lead to take his second win of the 1982 European Formula Two season and take his first Pau Grand Prix win.

== Classification ==
=== Race ===
Pos	No	Driver	Vehicle	Laps	Time/retired	Grid
1	4	(Venezuela) Johnny Cecotto	March-BMW	73	1hr 31min 00.03sec	7
2	32	(Belgium) Thierry Boutsen	Spirit-Honda	73	+ 15.90 s	1
3	19	(New Zealand) Mike Thackwell	March-BMW	73	+ 1:18.99 s	6
4	25	(Germany) Frank Jelinski	Maurer-BMW	72	+ 1 lap	12
5	1	(United Kingdom) Kenny Acheson	Ralt-Honda	72	+ 1 lap	9
6	2	(United Kingdom) Jonathan Palmer	Ralt-Honda	72	+ 1 lap	15
7	33	(Sweden) Stefan Johansson	Spirit-Honda	71	+ 2 laps	2
8	8	(France) Jean-Louis Schlesser	Maurer-BMW	67	+ 6 laps	13
9	7	(Germany) Stefan Bellof	Maurer-BMW	64	+ 9 laps	5
Ret	6	(Italy) Beppe Gabbiani	Maurer-BMW	47	Injector	18
Ret	21	(Italy) Piero Necchi	Toleman-Hart	44	Engine	17
Ret	18	(Italy) Oscar Pedersoli	Merzario-BMW	44	Accident	16
Ret	3	(Italy) Corrado Fabi	March-BMW	43	Wheel studs	3
Ret	5	(Germany) Christian Danner	March-BMW	28	Engine	8
Ret	30	(United States) Cliff Hansen	March-BMW	17	Accident	19
Ret	23	(France) Philippe Streiff	AGS-BMW	14	Engine	4
Ret	17	(Austria) Jo Gartner	Merzario-BMW	11	Engine	14
Ret	10	(Belgium) Thierry Tassin	Toleman-Hart	8	Hub	11
Ret	22	(Italy) Roberto del Castello	Toleman-BMW	0	Engine	10
DNQ	16	(Germany) Harald Brutschin	Merzario-BMW		Did not qualify	
DNQ	24	(France) Pascal Fabre	AGS-BMW		Did not qualify	
DNQ	12	(Italy) Alessandro Nannini	Minardi-BMW		Did not qualify	
DNQ	9	(Italy) Carlo Rossi	Docking Spitzley-Hart		Did not qualify	
DNQ	11	(Italy) Paolo Barilla	Minardi-BMW		Did not qualify	
DNPQ	26	(Austria) "Pierre Chauvet"	Maurer-BMW		Did Not Pre-Qualify	
DNPQ	28	(Italy) Guido Daccò	Minardi-BMW		Did Not Pre-Qualify	
DNA	20	(Sweden) Stanley Dickens	March-BMW		Did Not Attend	
Fastest Lap: Kenny Acheson (Ralt-Honda) - 1:12.37

Preceded by 1981 Pau Grand Prix	Pau Grand Prix; 1982	Succeeded by 1983 Pau Grand Prix
