= 1976 Pau Grand Prix =

Race details
- Date: 7 June 1976
- Official name: XXXVI Pau Grand Prix
- Location: Pau, France
- Course: Temporary Street Circuit
- Course length: 2.760 km (1.720 miles)
- Distance: 73 laps, 201.480 km (125.193 miles)

Pole position
Driver	(France) Patrick Tambay	Martini-Renault
- Time: 1:13.77

Fastest lap
Driver	(France) Jacques Laffite	Chevron-BMW
- Time: 1:14.37

Podium
First	(France) René Arnoux	Martini-Renault
Second	(France) Jacques Laffite	Chevron-BMW
Third	(France) Jean-Pierre Jabouille	Elf-Renault

The 1976 Pau Grand Prix was a Formula Two motor race held on 7 June 1976 at the Pau circuit, in Pau, Pyrénées-Atlantiques, France. The Grand Prix was won by René Arnoux, driving the Martini MK19. Jacques Laffite finished second and Jean-Pierre Jabouille third.

== Classification ==
=== Race ===
Pos	No	Driver	Vehicle	Laps	Time/Retired	Grid
1	2	(France) René Arnoux	Martini-Renault	73	1hr 32min 11.58sec	2
2	27	(France) Jacques Laffite	Chevron-BMW	73	+ 42.91 s	3
3	5	(France) Jean-Pierre Jabouille	Elf-Renault	72	+ 1 lap	4
4	18	(France) Jean-Pierre Jarier	Chevron-Hart	72	+ 1 lap	6
5	17	(Italy) Giancarlo Martini	March-BMW	72	+ 1 lap	8
6	4	(Brazil) Alex Ribeiro	March-Renault	71	+ 2 laps	15
7	23	(Germany) Klaus Ludwig	March-Hart	70	+ 3 laps	19
8	39	(Sweden) Freddy Kottulinsky	Ralt-BMW	69	+ 4 laps	18
9	7	(Italy) Gianfranco Trombetti	Chevron-BMW	68	+ 5 laps	14
Ret	15	(United States) Eddie Cheever	March-Hart	56	Accident	13
Ret	8	(Italy) Roberto Marazzi	Chevron-BMW	55	Engine mount	17
Ret	10	(France) François Migault	Osella-BMW	47	Value	16
Ret	25	(Italy) Giorgio Francia	Chevron-BMW	38	Driver fatigue	12
Ret	6	(France) Michel Leclère	Elf-Renault	34	Valve	5
Ret	19	(France) José Dolhem	Chevron-Hart	32	Gearbox	11
Ret	1	(France) Patrick Tambay	Martini-Renault	29	Accident	1
Ret	3	(Italy) Maurizio Flammini	March-BMW	27	Starter	7
Ret	14	(Canada) Gilles Villeneuve	March-Hart	13	Overheating	10
Ret	30	(Italy) Alberto Colombo	March-BMW	8	Piston	9
DNS	22	(Brazil) Ingo Hoffmann	March-Hart		Accident	
DNS	9	(Austria) Hans Binder	Osella-BMW			
DNQ	20	(France) Jean-Pierre Jaussaud	Chevron-Chrysler			
DNQ	29	(Italy) Alessandro Pesenti-Rossi	March-BMW			
DNQ	31	(France) Bernard Chevanne	March-BMW			
DNQ	32	(France) Xavier Lapeyre	Chevron-BMW			
DNQ	34	(United Kingdom) Ray Mallock	March-Ford			
DNQ	36	(Australia) Bob Muir	Minos-Ford			
DNQ	38	(Belgium) Bernard de Dryver	March-BMW			
Fastest Lap: Jacques Laffite (Chevron-BMW) - 1:14.37

Preceded by 1975 Pau Grand Prix	Pau Grand Prix; 1976	Succeeded by 1977 Pau Grand Prix
