= 1948 Pau Grand Prix =

Race details
- Date: 29 March 1948
- Official name: IX Grand Prix Automobile de Pau
- Location: Pau, France
- Course: Temporary Street Circuit
- Course length: 2.760 km (1.720 miles)
- Distance: 110 laps, 304.590 km (189.263 miles)

Pole position
Driver	(France) Jean-Pierre Wimille	Maserati 4CM
- Time: 1:49.7

Fastest lap
Driver	(France) Jean-Pierre Wimille	Maserati 4CM
- Time: 1:49.8

Podium
First	(Italy) Nello Pagani	Maserati 4CL
Second	(France) Yves Giraud-Cabantous	Talbot-Lago T26
Third	(France) Charles Pozzi	Talbot-Lago T26

The 1948 Pau Grand Prix was a non-championship Formula One motor race held on 29 March 1948 at the Pau circuit, in Pau, Pyrénées-Atlantiques, France. The Grand Prix was won by Nello Pagani, for the second time running, driving the Maserati 4CL. Yves Giraud-Cabantous finished second and Charles Pozzi third.

== Classification ==
=== Race ===
Pos	No	Driver	Vehicle	Laps	Time/Retired	Grid
1	22	(Italy) Nello Pagani	Maserati 4CL	110	3hrs 33min 30.3sec	8
2	18	(France) Yves Giraud-Cabantous	Talbot-Lago T26	108	+ 2 laps	4
3	12	(France) Charles Pozzi	Talbot-Lago T26	108	+ 2 laps	4
4	28	(France) Louis Rosier	Talbot-Lago 150C	107	+ 3 laps	4
5	2	(France) Jean-Pierre Wimille	Gordini T15	105	+ 5 laps	4
6	24	(Switzerland) Toulo de Graffenried	Maserati 4CL	100	+ 10 laps	4
Ret	8	(France) Raymond Sommer	Maserati 4CL	100	Collision	4
Ret	6	(France) José Scaron (Thailand) B. Bira	Gordini T15	55	Rocker	4
Ret	16	(Monaco) Louis Chiron	Talbot-Lago T26	50	Oil leak	4
Ret	20	(France) Eugène Martin	BMW 328	38	Cylinder	4
Ret	10	(France) Eugène Chaboud	Delahaye 135 S	25	Cylinder	4
Ret	4	(Thailand) B. Bira	Gordini T15	18	Rocker	4
Ret	32	(United States) Harry Schell	Cisitalia D46	18	Rear axle	4
Ret	26	(France) Henri Louveau	Maserati 4CL	14	Ignition	4
Ret	30	(France) Maurice Trintignant	Talbot-Lago 150 SS	14	Rear axle	4
Ret	14	(France) Roger Loyer	Cisitalia D46	2	Cylinder	4
Fastest Lap: Jean-Pierre Wimille (Gordini T15) – 1:49.8

Preceded by 1947 Pau Grand Prix	Pau Grand Prix; 1948	Succeeded by 1949 Pau Grand Prix
