= 1939 Pau Grand Prix =

Race details
- Date: 2 April 1939
- Official name: Grand Prix de Pau
- Location: Pau, France
- Course: Temporary Street Circuit
- Course length: 2.760 km (1.720 miles)
- Distance: 100 laps, 276.900 km (172.100 miles)

Pole position
Driver	(Germany) Manfred von Brauchitsch	Mercedes-Benz W154
- Time: 1:46.0

Fastest lap
Driver	(Germany) Manfred von Brauchitsch	Mercedes-Benz W154
- Time: 1:46.8

Podium
First	(Germany) Hermann Lang	Mercedes-Benz W154
Second	(Germany) Manfred von Brauchitsch	Mercedes-Benz W154
Third	(France) Philippe Étancelin	Talbot MD

The 1939 Pau Grand Prix was a motor race held on 2 April 1939 at the Pau circuit, in Pau, Pyrénées-Atlantiques, France. The Grand Prix was won by Hermann Lang, driving the Mercedes-Benz W154. Manfred von Brauchitsch finished second and Philippe Étancelin third.

With the event of World War II, this would be the last Pau Grand Prix until 1947, two years after the war ended.

== Classification ==
=== Race ===
Pos	No	Driver	Vehicle	Laps	Time/Retired	Grid
1	18	(Germany) Hermann Lang	Mercedes-Benz W154	100	3hr 07min 25.2sec	2
2	10	(Germany) Manfred von Brauchitsch	Mercedes-Benz W154	100	+ 16.8 s	1
3	16	(France) Philippe Étancelin	Talbot MD	98	+ 2 laps	6
4	8	(France) Raymond Sommer	Alfa Romeo Tipo 308	95	+ 5 laps	4
5	6	(France) Joseph Paul	Delahaye 135	92	+ 8 laps	9
6	28	(France) Robert Mazaud	Delahaye 135	92	+ 8 laps	11
7	26	(France) René Biolay	Delahaye 135	88	+ 12 laps	12
8	14	(France) Marcel Contet	Delahaye 135	86	+ 14 laps	13
Ret	24	(France) Jean Trémoulet	S.E.F.A.C.	35	Retired	14
Ret	4	(France) René Carrièrè	Talbot MD	31	Crash / Oil line	5
Ret	2	(Germany) Rudolf Caracciola	Mercedes-Benz W154	31	Broken oil line	3
Ret	30	(France) Marcel Balsa	Bugatti T35B	22	Mechanical	8
Ret	22	(France) Eugène Chaboud	Delahaye 135	10	Retired	10
Ret	12	(France) Maurice Trintignant	Bugatti T51	5	Engine overheating	15
Ret	20	(Switzerland) Toulo de Graffenried	Maserati 6C-34	3	Gearbox	7

Preceded by 1938 Pau Grand Prix	Pau Grand Prix; 1939	Succeeded by 1947 Pau Grand Prix
