= 1986 Pau Grand Prix =

Race details
- Date: 19 May 1986
- Official name: XLVI Pau Grand Prix
- Location: Pau, France
- Course: Temporary Street Circuit
- Course length: 2.760 km (1.720 miles)
- Distance: 73 laps, 201.480 km (125.560 miles)

Pole position
Driver	(Italy) Emanuele Pirro	Onyx Racing

Fastest lap
Driver	(Italy) Emanuele Pirro	Onyx Racing
- Time: 1:13.700

Podium
First	(New Zealand) Mike Thackwell	Team Ralt
Second	(Italy) Emanuele Pirro	Onyx Racing
Third	(France) Michel Ferté	Oreca Motorsport

The 46th Grand Prix Automobile de Pau (Pau Grand Prix), was the third round of the 1986 International Formula 3000. This race was held around the streets of the city of Pau, Pyrénées-Atlantiques, south-western France, on 19 May.

== Report ==
=== Entry ===
For this round, a total of 37 arrived in Pau for the race, with just 21 spaces available on the grid for the race.

=== Qualifying ===
Emanuele Pirro took pole position for Onyx Racing, in their March-Cosworth 86B, averaging a speed of 86.239 mph.

=== Race ===
The race was held over 73 laps of the Circuit de Pau-Ville. Mike Thackwell took the winner spoils for works Ralt team, driving their Ralt-Honda RT20. The Kiwi won in a time of 1hr 31:17.92., averaging a speed of 82.276 mph. Second place went to the poleman, Emanuele Pirro aboard the Onyx Racing entered March-Cosworth 86B, who was 6.15 seconds adrift. The podium was completed by the Frenchman, Michel Ferté in the Team Oreca’s March-Cosworth 86B, a further 20 seconds behind.

== Classification ==
=== Race result ===
Pos.	No.	Driver	Entrant	Car	Laps	Time
1	5	(New Zealand) Mike Thackwell	Team Ralt	Ralt-Honda	73	1hr 31min 17.92sec
2	6	(Italy) Emanuele Pirro	Onyx Racing	March-Cosworth	73	+ 53.15 s
3	10	(France) Michel Ferté	Oreca Motorsport	March-Cosworth	73	+ 1:13.22 s
4	48	(France) Richard Dallest	Equipe Danielson	AGS-Cosworth	72	+ 1 lap
5	40	(Spain) Luis Pérez-Sala	Pavesi Racing	Ralt-Cosworth	72	+ 1 lap
6	7	(Canada) John Jones	Onyx Racing	March-Cosworth	71	+ 2 laps
7	12	(Italy) Lamberto Leoni	ITI F3000/FIRST	March-Cosworth	71	+ 2 laps
Ret	1	(Sweden) Tomas Kaiser	BS Automotive	Lola-Cosworth	51	Driveshaft
Ret	11	(France) Pierre-Henri Raphanel	Oreca Motorsport	March-Cosworth	51	Gearbox
Ret	36	(Italy) Ivan Capelli	Genoa Racing	March-Cosworth	35	Accident
Ret	15	(France) Alain Ferté	ITI F3000/FIRST	March-Cosworth	29	Engine
Ret	9	(France) Philippe Alliot	Oreca Motorsport	March-Cosworth	21	Accident
Ret	19	(France) Pascal Fabre	Lola Motorsport	Lola-Cosworth	20	Throttle
Ret	42	(Spain) Adrián Campos	Peter Gethin Racing	March-Cosworth	17	Accident
Ret	34	(Italy) Gabriele Tarquini	Coloni Racing	March-Cosworth	6	Wheel Bearing
Ret	4	(Denmark) John Nielsen	Team Ralt	Ralt-Honda	2	Electrical
Ret	16	(Germany) Volker Weidler	Bromley Motorsport	Ralt-Cosworth	0	Accident
Ret	21	(United Kingdom) Russell Spence	Eddie Jordan Racing	March-Cosworth 86B	0	Accident
Ret	27	(Switzerland) Mario Hytten	Arno International	Ralt-Cosworth	0	Accident
DNS	26	(Brazil) Maurício Gugelmin	West Surrey Racing	March-Cosworth		Did not start
Participants below did not qualify
DNQ	2	(United States) Ken Johnson	BS Automotive	Lola-Cosworth		Did not qualify
DNQ	23	(United States) Jeff MacPherson	Colin Bennett Racing	March-Cosworth		Did not qualify
DNQ	41	(Italy) Pierluigi Martini	Pavesi Racing	Ralt-Cosworth		Did not qualify
DNQ	3	(United Kingdom) Andrew Gilbert-Scott	BS Automotive	Lola-Cosworth		Did not qualify
DNQ	33	(United Kingdom) Gary Evans	GEM	Lola-Cosworth		Did not qualify
DNQ	38	(Chile) Eliseo Salazar	RAM Motorsport	RAM-Cosworth		Did not qualify
DNQ	17	(Italy) Claudio Antonioli	San Remo Racing Srl	March-Cosworth		Did not qualify
DNQ	44	(Finland) Jari Nurminen	Venturini Racing	March-Cosworth		Did not qualify
DNQ	47	(Italy) Aldo Bertuzzi	Minardi Team Alfonso	Minardi-Cosworth		Did not qualify
DNQ	22	(Austria) ”Pierre Chauvet”	Eddie Jordan Racing	March-Cosworth		Did not qualify
DNQ	24	(France) Cathy Muller	Horag Racing	Lola-Cosworth		Did not qualify
DNQ	18	(Italy) Franco Tacchino	San Remo Racing Srl	March-Cosworth		Did not qualify
DNQ	28	(Germany) Altfrid Heger	Bertram Schäfer Racing	Ralt-Cosworth		Did not qualify
DNQ	14	(Italy) Franco Scapini	ITI F3000/FIRST	March-Cosworth		Did not qualify
DNQ	8	(United States) Cary Bren	Onyx Racing	March-Cosworth		Did not qualify
DNQ	30	(Switzerland) Jean-Pierre Frey	Team Dollop	March-Cosworth		Did not qualify
Fastest Lap: (Italy) Emanuele Pirro (Onyx Racing) – 1:13.700 or (83.772 mph)
