= 1987 Pau Grand Prix =

Race details
- Date: 8 June 1987
- Official name: XLVII Pau Grand Prix
- Location: Pau, France
- Course: Temporary Street Circuit
- Course length: 2.760 km (1.720 miles)
- Distance: 72 laps, 198.72 km (123.84 miles)

Pole position
Driver	(France) Pierre-Henri Raphanel	Onyx Racing
- Time: 1:11.880

Fastest lap
Driver	(Brazil) Roberto Moreno	Ralt Racing Ltd.
- Time: 1:13.640

Podium
First	(France) Yannick Dalmas	Oreca Motorsport
Second	(Canada) John Jones	Lola Motorsport
Third	(France) Michel Ferté	BS Automotive

The 1987 Pau Grand Prix was a Formula 3000 motor race held on 8 June 1987 at the Pau circuit, in Pau, Pyrénées-Atlantiques, France.

== Entry list ==
Entrant	Chassis	Engine	No	Driver
(Italy) Genoa Racing	March 87B	Cosworth DFV	2	(Switzerland) Gregor Foitek
(Italy) Pavesi Racing	Ralt RT21	Cosworth DFV	3	(Italy) Pierluigi Martini
(Italy) Pavesi Racing	Ralt RT21	Cosworth DFV	4	(Italy) Paolo Barilla
(France) Oreca Motorsport	March 87B	Cosworth DFV	5	(France) Olivier Grouillard
(France) Oreca Motorsport	March 87B	Cosworth DFV	6	(France) Yannick Dalmas
(United Kingdom) Ralt Racing Ltd.	Ralt RT21	Honda	7	(Brazil) Roberto Moreno
(United Kingdom) Ralt Racing Ltd.	Ralt RT21	Honda	8	(Brazil) Maurício Gugelmin
(United Kingdom) Onyx Racing	March 87B	Cosworth DFV	9	(Italy) Stefano Modena
(United Kingdom) Onyx Racing	March 87B	Cosworth DFV	10	(France) Pierre-Henri Raphanel
(United Kingdom) Lola Motorsport	Lola T87/50	Cosworth DFV	11	(Canada) John Jones
(United Kingdom) Lola Motorsport	Lola T87/50	Cosworth DFV	12	(Spain) Luis Pérez-Sala
(United Kingdom) BS Automotive	Lola T87/50	Cosworth DFV	14	(France) Dominique Delestre
(United Kingdom) BS Automotive	Lola T87/50	Cosworth DFV	40	(France) Michel Ferté
(United Kingdom) Bromley Motorsport	Ralt RT21	Cosworth DFV	18	(Chile) Eliseo Salazar
(Republic of Ireland) Eddie Jordan Racing	March 87B	Cosworth DFV	20	(Sweden) Tomas Kaiser
(Republic of Ireland) Eddie Jordan Racing	March 87B	Cosworth DFV	21	(Switzerland) Mario Hytten
(United Kingdom) Roni Motorsport	March 87B	Cosworth DFV	22	(Sweden) Steven Andskär
(United Kingdom) GEM Motorsport	Ralt RT21	Cosworth DFV	23	(United Kingdom) Gary Evans
(Italy) EuroVenturini	Dallara 3087	Cosworth DFV	25	(Italy) Marco Apicella
(Italy) EuroVenturini	Dallara 3087	Cosworth DFV	26	(Finland) Jari Nurminen
(United Kingdom) Madgwick International	March 87B	Cosworth DFV	28	(United Kingdom) Andy Wallace
(Italy) FIRST Racing	March 87B	Cosworth DFV	31	(Italy) Lamberto Leoni
(Italy) FIRST Racing	March 87B	Cosworth DFV	32	(Italy) Gabriele Tarquini
(Italy) FIRST Racing	March 87B	Cosworth DFV	33	(Italy) Aldo Bertuzzi
(France) GBDA Motorsport	Lola T87/50	Cosworth DFV	35	(France) Michel Trollé
(France) GBDA Motorsport	Lola T87/50	Cosworth DFV	36	(France) Paul Belmondo
(United Kingdom) Murray Taylor Racing	March 87B	Cosworth DFV	38	(United Kingdom) Russell Spence
(France) Équipe Dollop	March 86B	Cosworth DFV	41	(Italy) Guido Daccò

== Classification ==
=== Qualifying ===
Pos	No	Driver	Team	Time	Grid
1	10	(France) Pierre-Henri Raphanel	Onyx Racing	1:11.880	1
2	8	(Brazil) Maurício Gugelmin	Ralt Racing Ltd.	1:11.920	2
3	7	(Brazil) Roberto Moreno	Ralt Racing Ltd.	1:12.210	3
4	12	(Spain) Luis Pérez-Sala	Lola Motorsport	1:12.580	4
5	32	(Italy) Gabriele Tarquini	FIRST Racing	1:12.590	5
6	3	(Italy) Pierluigi Martini	Pavesi Racing	1:12.620	6
7	6	(France) Yannick Dalmas	Oreca Motorsport	1:12.650	5
8	9	(Italy) Stefano Modena	Onyx Racing	1:12.650	8
9	35	(France) Michel Trollé	GBDA Motorsport	1:12.700	9
10	11	(Canada) John Jones	Lola Motorsport	1:12.980	10
11	36	(France) Paul Belmondo	GBDA Motorsport	1:13.150	11
12	14	(France) Dominique Delestre	BS Automotive	1:13.200	12
13	5	(France) Olivier Grouillard	Oreca Motorsport	1:13.220	13
14	40	(France) Michel Ferté	BS Automotive	1:13.240	14
15	4	(Italy) Paolo Barilla	Pavesi Racing	1:13.440	15
16	20	(Sweden) Tomas Kaiser	Eddie Jordan Racing	1:13.520	16
17	21	(Switzerland) Mario Hytten	Eddie Jordan Racing	1:13.600	17
18	31	(Italy) Lamberto Leoni	FIRST Racing	1:13.710	18
19	18	(Chile) Eliseo Salazar	Bromley Motorsport	1:13.880	19
20	2	(Switzerland) Gregor Foitek	Genoa Racing	1:13.900	20
21	38	(United Kingdom) Russell Spence	Murray Taylor Racing	1:14.010	21
22	25	(Italy) Marco Apicella	EuroVenturini	1:14.580	22
Did not qualify
23	28	(United Kingdom) Andy Wallace	Madgwick International	1:13.960	23
24	26	(Finland) Jari Nurminen	EuroVenturini	1:14.010	25
25	23	(United Kingdom) Gary Evans	GEM Motorsport	1:14.820	24
26	22	(Sweden) Steven Andskär	Roni Motorsport	1:15.550	27
27	41	(Italy) Guido Daccò	Équipe Dollop	1:15.900	28
28	33	(Italy) Aldo Bertuzzi	FIRST Racing	1:18.210	26

=== Race ===
Pos	No	Driver	Team	Laps	Time/retired	Grid	Pts
1	6	(France) Yannick Dalmas	Oreca Motorsport	72	1hr 30min 14.550sec	7	9
2	11	(Canada) John Jones	Lola Motorsport	72	+ 9.920 s	10	6
3	40	(France) Michel Ferté	BS Automotive	72	+ 10.250 s	14	4
4	5	(France) Olivier Grouillard	Oreca Motorsport	72	+ 26.560 s	13	3
5	36	(France) Paul Belmondo	GBDA Motorsport	72	+ 35.550 s	11	2
6	31	(Italy) Lamberto Leoni	FIRST Racing	72	+ 37.850 s	18	1
7	3	(Italy) Pierluigi Martini	Pavesi Racing	71	+ 1 lap	6	
8	4	(Italy) Paolo Barilla	Pavesi Racing	71	+ 1 lap	15	
9	21	(Switzerland) Mario Hytten	Eddie Jordan Racing	71	+ 1 lap	17	
10	7	(Brazil) Roberto Moreno	Ralt Racing Ltd.	70	+ 2 laps	3	
11	32	(Italy) Gabriele Tarquini	FIRST Racing	67	+ 5 laps	5	
Ret	12	(Spain) Luis Pérez-Sala	Lola Motorsport	58	Accident	4	
Ret	8	(Brazil) Maurício Gugelmin	Ralt Racing Ltd.	46	Electrical	2	
Ret	25	(Italy) Marco Apicella	EuroVenturini	43	Driveshaft	22	
Ret	14	(France) Dominique Delestre	Lola Motorsport	17	Brakes	12	
Ret	38	(United Kingdom) Russell Spence	Murray Taylor Racing	16	Drive pegs	21	
Ret	10	(France) Pierre-Henri Raphanel	Onyx Racing	15	Accident	1	
Ret	2	(Switzerland) Gregor Foitek	Genoa Racing	7	Accident	20	
Ret	20	(Sweden) Tomas Kaiser	Eddie Jordan Racing	6	Accident	16	
Ret	9	(Italy) Stefano Modena	Onyx Racing	2	Accident	8	
Ret	18	(Chile) Eliseo Salazar	Bromley Motorsport	1	Steering	19	
Ret	35	(France) Michel Trollé	GBDA Motorsport	0	Accident	22	
Fastest Lap: Roberto Moreno (Ralt Racing Ltd.) – 1:13.64
