= 1947 Pau Grand Prix =

Race details
- Date: 4 April 1947
- Official name: VIII Pau Grand Prix
- Location: Pau, France
- Course: Temporary Street Circuit
- Course length: 2.760 km (1.720 miles)
- Distance: 110 laps, 304.590 km (189.263 miles)

Pole position
Driver	(France) Raymond Sommer	Maserati 4CM
- Time: 1:49.2

Fastest lap
Driver	(France) Raymond Sommer	Maserati 4CM
- Time: 1:49.1

Podium
First	(Italy) Nello Pagani	Maserati 4CL
Second	(France) Pierre Levegh	Delage 3000
Third	(France) Henri Louveau	Maserati 4CL

The 1947 Pau Grand Prix was a non-championship Formula One motor race held on 4 April 1947 at the Pau circuit, in Pau, Pyrénées-Atlantiques, France. The Grand Prix was won by Nello Pagani, driving with the Maserati 4CL. Pierre Levegh finished second and Henri Louveau third.

== Classification ==
=== Race ===
Pos	No	Driver	Vehicle	Laps	Time/Retired	Grid
1	22	(Italy) Nello Pagani	Maserati 4CL	110	3hrs 38min 31.0sec	8
2	12	(France) Pierre Levegh	Delage 3000	108	+ 2 laps	4
3	26	(France) Henri Louveau	Maserati 4CL	108	+ 2 laps	5
4	14	(France) Jean Achard	Delage 3000	107	+ 3 laps	11
5	10	(France) Philippe Étancelin (France) Georges Grignard	Delage 3000	107	+ 3 laps	7
6	6	(France) Yves Giraud-Cabantous (France) Eugène Chaboud	Delahaye 135 S	104	+ 6 laps	10
7	18	(United Kingdom) Ian Connell (United Kingdom) Kenneth Evans	Maserati 6CM	96	+ 14 laps	12
Ret	8	(France) Raymond Sommer	Maserati 4CM	78	Accident	1
Ret	30	(France) Jean-Pierre Wimille (Italy) Amédée Gordini	Gordini T15	63	Clutch	6
Ret	24	(France) Charles Pozzi (France) Roger Loyer	Delahaye 135 S	46	Wheel	14
Ret	16	(Thailand) B. Bira	ERA B	36	Retired	3
Ret	4	(France) Henri Trillaud	Delahaye 135 S	28	Gearbox	9
Ret	2	(France) Eugène Chaboud	Talbot-Lago T26	4	Suspension	2
Ret	20	(Italy) Arialdo Ruggeri	Maserati 4CL	0	Accident	13
DNS	28	(France) Louis Rosier	Talbot-Lago 150C		Did Not Start	
Fastest Lap: Raymond Sommer (Maserati 4CM) – 1:49.1

Preceded by 1939 Pau Grand Prix	Pau Grand Prix; 1947	Succeeded by 1948 Pau Grand Prix
