= 1977 European Formula Two Championship =

1977 European Formula Two season

Seasons
- ← 1976 1978 →

The 1977 European Formula Two season was contested over 13 rounds. Frenchman René Arnoux was the season champion, driving a Martini-Renault/Gordini for Ecurie Renault Elf.

== Calendar ==
Race No	Circuit	Date	Laps	Distance	Time	Speed	Pole position	Fastest lap	Winner
1	(United Kingdom) Silverstone	6 March	47	4.719=221.793 km	1'05:45.22	202.385 km/h	(France) Michel Leclère	(Belgium) Patrick Nève	(France) René Arnoux
2	(United Kingdom) Thruxton	11 April	50	3.792=189.600 km	1'05:59.43	172.388 km/h	(Brazil) Alex Ribeiro	(United Kingdom) Brian Henton	(United Kingdom) Brian Henton
3	(West Germany) Hockenheim	17 April	20+20	6.789=271.56 km	1'21:20.4; 1'21:30.4	200.315 km/h 199.905 km/h	(West Germany) Jochen Mass	(United States) Eddie Cheever	(West Germany) Jochen Mass (France) René Arnoux
4	(West Germany) Nürburgring (Eifelrennen)	1 May	9	22.835=205,515 km	1'06:41.1; 1'06:54.3	184.913 km/h 184.305 km/h	(Italy) Riccardo Patrese	(West Germany) Jochen Mass	(West Germany) Jochen Mass (United States) Eddie Cheever
5	(Italy) Vallelunga	15 May	65	3.2=208.0 km	1'16:57.36	162.171 km/h	(Italy) Bruno Giacomelli	(Italy) Bruno Giacomelli	(Italy) Bruno Giacomelli
6	(France) Pau	30 May	59	2.76=162.84 km	1'14:52.52	130.489 km/h	(France) Patrick Tambay	(France) Didier Pironi	(France) René Arnoux
7	(Italy) Mugello	19 June	42	5.245=220.290 km	1'16:36.5	172.532 km/h	(Italy) Riccardo Patrese	(Italy) Alessandro Pesenti-Rossi	(Italy) Bruno Giacomelli
8	(France) Rouen	26 June	38	5.543=210.634 km	1'08:36.19	184.219 km/h	(United States) Eddie Cheever	(Brazil) Ingo Hoffmann	(United States) Eddie Cheever
9	(France) Nogaro	10 July	65	3.12=202.80 km	1'20:42.69	150.759 km/h	(France) René Arnoux	(Italy) Riccardo Patrese	(France) René Arnoux
10	(Italy) Pergusa-Enna	24 July	30+30	4.95=297.0 km	1'36:18.0	185.047 km/h	(Finland) Keke Rosberg	(Italy) Riccardo Patrese	(Finland) Keke Rosberg
11	(Italy) Misano	7 August	30+30	3.488=209.28 km	1'13:44.8	170.269 km/h	(Italy) Bruno Giacomelli	(Italy) Bruno Giacomelli	(Italy) Lamberto Leoni
12	(Portugal) Estoril	2 October	50	4.35=217.50 km	1'19:29.30	164.175 km/h	(France) Didier Pironi	(Republic of Ireland) Derek Daly	(France) Didier Pironi
13	(United Kingdom) Donington Park	30 October	65	3.149=204.685 km	1'12:40.35	168.992 km/h	(Italy) Bruno Giacomelli	(Italy) Bruno Giacomelli	(Italy) Bruno Giacomelli

Note:

Race 3, 10 and 11 were held in two heats, with results shown in aggregate.

Race 6 originally scheduled over 73 laps, but stopped early due to heavy rain.

Races 3 and 4 were won by a graded driver, all graded drivers are shown in italics (recent F2 champions or successful F1 drivers could compete, but were not awarded any points)

== Final point standings ==
Points were awarded to the top six classified non-graded finishers in the following system:

Position	1st	2nd	3rd	4th	5th	6th
Race	9	6	4	3	2	1

Pos	Driver	SIL (United Kingdom)	THR (United Kingdom)	HOC (West Germany)	NÜR (West Germany)	VLL (Italy)	PAU (France)	MUG (Italy)	ROU (France)	NOG (France)	ENN (Italy)	MIS (Italy)	EST (Portugal)	DON (United Kingdom)	Pts
1	(France) René Arnoux	1	Ret	2	5	Ret	1	16†	Ret	1^{P}	2	Ret	2	6	52
2	(United States) Eddie Cheever	7	2	Ret^{F}	2	3	Ret	17†	1^{P}	5	Ret	2	3		40
3	(France) Didier Pironi	Ret	Ret	Ret	4	2	2^{F}	Ret	3	Ret	4	5	1^{P}	3	38
4	(Italy) Bruno Giacomelli	Ret	Ret	Ret	6	1^{P}^{F}	Ret	1	Ret	4	7	10^{P}^{F}	14	1^{P}^{F}	32
=	(Italy) Riccardo Patrese	6	5	3	Ret^{P}	8	3	2^{P}	2	2^{F}	Ret^{F}	Ret	6	Ret	32
6	(Finland) Keke Rosberg	Ret	Ret	8	3	12	11	Ret		13	1^{P}		4	2	25
7	(Brazil) Ingo Hoffmann	4	Ret	Ret	7	16†	8	9	5^{F}	3	3	3	Ret	Ret	18
=	(Italy) Alberto Colombo	5	4	6	11	5	4†	3	6	6	Ret	Ret	13	13	18
9	(Italy) Alessandro Pesenti-Rossi		NC	4	17	4	Ret	4^{F}	NC	Ret	11	4			13
10	(United Kingdom) Brian Henton	DNS	1^{F}	5	9		9							7	12
11	(Italy) Lamberto Leoni		Ret	DNQ		Ret	DNQ	7	DNQ	9	8	1	9		9
12	(United Kingdom) Ray Mallock	2	Ret	9				11		EX				DNQ	6
13	(Switzerland) Marc Surer	9	7	Ret		7		5	Ret	7				4	5
14	(Brazil) Alex Ribeiro		3^{P}			14			7			DNQ		8	4
=	(Belgium) Patrick Nève	3^{F}													4
=	(Italy) Gaudenzio Mantova			DNS		10	5	14	Ret	NC	5	Ret			4
17	(Italy) Gianfranco Brancatelli	DNS	DNS			13	12†	8	4	Ret	Ret	Ret	DNQ		3
18	(United States) Danny Sullivan			DNQ				12	DNQ	11		9	11	5	2
=	(Republic of Ireland) Derek Daly												5^{F}		2
20	(Argentina) Ricardo Zunino		9	Ret	14	11	6†	Ret	10	Ret	Ret	Ret	DNQ	Ret	1
=	(Belgium) Bernard de Dryver	DNS	Ret	10	Ret	9	DNQ	6	11	Ret		Ret	Ret	16	1
=	(Austria) Hans Royer		6					Ret						12	1
=	(Italy) Gianfranco Trombetti		Ret	Ret		DNQ					6	DNQ			1
=	(Italy) Luciano Pavesi					6		Ret				Ret			1
=	(France) Patrick Bardinon											7		Ret	1
—	(Sweden) Freddy Kottulinsky	8	Ret	Ret	10	15	13†	10	8	Ret	9	Ret	7		0
—	(West Germany) Klaus Ludwig	Ret	Ret	Ret	8	DSQ	7							Ret	0
—	(Italy) Elio de Angelis											8	Ret	10	0
—	(Italy) Giancarlo Martini	Ret	Ret	Ret	12	Ret	Ret	Ret		8	Ret	Ret	12	Ret	0
—	(United States) Wink Bancroft	Ret	8	13	18	DNQ	DNQ	18	DNQ	DNQ	NC	DNQ	DNQ		0
—	(Sweden) Eje Elgh												8		0
—	(United Kingdom) Norman Dickson	10	Ret	Ret	15		DNQ		NC					9	0
—	(Italy) Maurizio Flammini					Ret		Ret	9		10	DNQ			0
—	(France) Michel Leclère	Ret^{P}	Ret	Ret	DNS	Ret	Ret	DNS	DNQ	NC		DNQ	10		0
—	(France) Alain Prost									10			Ret		0
—	(West Germany) Willi Deutsch	Ret	Ret	11	16										0
—	(United Kingdom) Derek Cook	11													0
—	(Italy) Piercarlo Ghinzani													11	0
—	(United States) Gregg Young							13			12				0
—	(France) Xavier Lapeyre					DNQ	Ret		DNQ	12	Ret	DNQ			0
—	(West Germany) Helmut Bross			12	Ret										0
—	(United Kingdom) Valentino Musetti	12	DNQ												0
—	(United Kingdom) Guy Edwards				13	DNQ									0
—	(United Kingdom) Kim Mather													14	0
—	(Italy) Gimax							15				DNQ			0
—	(United Kingdom) Divina Galica													15	0
—	(France) Marc Sourd												Ret	17	0
—	(West Germany) Roland Binder				20							DNQ			0
—	(France) Jean-Pierre Jaussaud								NC	DNQ					0
—	(Switzerland) Markus Hotz				NC										0
—	(Italy) Carlo Giorgio					DNQ		Ret			Ret	DNQ	DNQ	DNQ	0
—	(United Kingdom) Bob Evans	Ret	Ret												0
—	(Austria) Harald Ertl			Ret	Ret										0
—	(France) Patrick Tambay						Ret^{P}		Ret						0
—	(Switzerland) Laurent Ferrier			DNQ		DNQ							Ret		0
—	(Austria) Gerd Biechteler			DNQ				Ret							0
—	(United Kingdom) Iain McLaren	Ret													0
—	(Italy) Lorenzo Niccolini							Ret							0
—	(Italy) Guido Pardini							Ret							0
—	(France) José Dolhem								Ret						0
—	(United Kingdom) Tiff Needell													Ret	0
—	(Republic of Ireland) Alo Lawler	DNS												DNQ	0
—	(Italy) Roberto Marazzi	DNS													0
—	(France) Michel Pignard						DNQ		DNQ	DNQ			DNQ		0
—	(France) Pierre Maublanc								DNQ			DNQ		DNQ	0
—	(Switzerland) André Chevalley			DNQ		DNQ									0
—	(Socialist Federal Republic of Yugoslavia) Franci Jerančič										DNQ	DNQ			0
—	(Argentina) Ariel Bakst												DNQ	DNQ	0
—	(United Kingdom) Roy Baker	DNQ													0
—	(United Kingdom) Andy Sutcliffe		DNQ												0
—	(West Germany) Henning Hagenbauer			DNQ											0
—	(Italy) Alfonso Giordano					DNQ									0
—	(France) Jimmy Mieusset									DNQ					0
—	(Switzerland) Charly Kiser											DNQ			0
—	(Italy) Stanislao Sterzel											DNQ			0
—	(Portugal) Mário Silva												DNQ		0
—	(United Kingdom) Adrian Russell													DNQ	0
Graded drivers ineligible for points
—	(West Germany) Jochen Mass			1^{P}	1^{F}										0
—	(Switzerland) Clay Regazzoni				Ret							6			0
—	(France) Jacques Laffite			7			10		Ret						0
—	(Australia) Alan Jones				19										0
—	(West Germany) Hans-Joachim Stuck			Ret											0
—	(Italy) Vittorio Brambilla											Ret			0
—	(Italy) Arturo Merzario											Ret			0
Pos	Driver	SIL (United Kingdom)	THR (United Kingdom)	HOC (West Germany)	NÜR (West Germany)	VLL (Italy)	PAU (France)	MUG (Italy)	ROU (France)	NOG (France)	ENN (Italy)	MIS (Italy)	EST (Portugal)	DON (United Kingdom)	Pts

Key
Colour	Result
Gold	Winner
Silver	Second place
Bronze	Third place
Green	Other points position
Blue	Other classified position
Blue	Not classified, finished (NC)
Purple	Not classified, retired (Ret)
Red	Did not qualify (DNQ)
Red	Did not pre-qualify (DNPQ)
Black	Disqualified (DSQ)
White	Did not start (DNS)
White	Race cancelled (C)
Blank	Did not practice (DNP)
Blank	Excluded (EX)
Blank	Did not arrive (DNA)
Blank	Withdrawn (WD)
Blank	Did not enter (empty cell)
Annotation	Meaning
P	Pole position
F	Fastest lap
†	Did not finish, but classified for completing over 90% of the race distance
