= 1960 Formula Two season =

1960 season for the Formula Two racing class

The 1960 Formula Two season was the last season of 1.5 litre Formula Two racing which was to become Formula One for 1961. Two championships were held over the same five events, the Formula Two Constructors' Championship and the Formula Two Drivers' Championship, in addition to many non-championship Formula Two events. The Constructors' Championship was won in a draw by Cooper-Climax and Porsche, while the Drivers' Championship was won by Jack Brabham.

== Championship Schedule ==
Rnd	Race	Circuit	Date	Pole position	Fastest lap	Winning driver	Constructor	Report
1	(Italy) Syracuse Grand Prix	Syracuse	19 March	(United Kingdom) Stirling Moss	(United Kingdom) Stirling Moss	(West Germany) Wolfgang von Trips	(Italy) Ferrari	Report
2	(Belgium) Brussels Grand Prix	Heysel	10 April	(Sweden) Jo Bonnier	(United Kingdom) Stirling Moss	(Australia) Jack Brabham	(United Kingdom) Cooper-Climax	Report
3	(France) Pau Grand Prix	Pau	18 April	(Australia) Jack Brabham	(France) Maurice Trintignant	(Australia) Jack Brabham	(United Kingdom) Cooper-Climax	Report
4	(United Kingdom) Aintree 200	Aintree	30 April	(United Kingdom) Stirling Moss	(United Kingdom) John Surtees	(United Kingdom) Stirling Moss	(West Germany) Porsche	Report
5	(West Germany) German Grand Prix	Nürburgring	31 July	(Sweden) Jo Bonnier	(Sweden) Jo Bonnier	(Sweden) Jo Bonnier	(West Germany) Porsche	Report

== Season review ==
As 1961 was to see the new 1.5 litre Formula One, some manufacturers used the 1960 Formula Two season as preparation for 1961 the following year. Although it did not appear in any championship events, Ferrari's first mid/rear-engined racing car, the Ferrari 156, appeared in non-championship events, notably winning the Solitude Grand Prix against strong opposition from Porsche.

=== Race by race ===
==== Race 1: Syracuse Grand Prix ====
Ferrari entered the Syracuse Grand Prix with a heavily revised version of their 1959 cars for Wolfgang von Trips. Team Lotus entered two cars, one of which was the new Lotus 18 making its European debut driven by Innes Ireland. Neither the factory Coopers nor the factory Porsches were entered, however many private Coopers appeared, notably including factory driver Jack Brabham self entered in an older car, Équipe Nationale Belge and Yeoman Credit Racing entered two Coopers each, and Maurice Trintignant also self entered a Cooper. Porsche were represented by just a single entry from Rob Walker Racing Team for Stirling Moss.

In practice, Moss established the fastest time, followed by Innes Ireland and Olivier Gendebien in one of the Equipe Nationale Belge Coopers who joined Moss on the front row. von Trips was not considered a serious contender for the win and qualified in seventh.

In the race Moss lead from the start, building up a sizeable lead. Surprisingly, and to the Italian crowd's pleasure, von Trips was in second place by the end of the first lap, followed closely by Ireland and the Coopers, led by Brabham. Brabham was able to push up into second place, with Ireland third and von Trips fourth, before Brabham was first overtaken by Ireland then forced to retire. Light rain arrived around lap 23, which favoured the Ferrari, allowing von Trips into second. Soon after Moss suffered an engine failure which caused him to retire, handing the lead to von Trips. Trintignant's private Cooper finished second, and Gendebien third, with Ireland finishing fourth due to minor engine trouble.

==== Race 2: Brussels Grand Prix ====
The Brussels Grand Prix was held over two heats, with overall positions determined by adding the two finishing positions in the heats, with ties decided by number of laps completed. Wolfgang von Trips, although entered in a Ferrari, did not appear, whilst the Lotuses were quite uncompetitive, so the racing was between the Rob Walker Porsche of Stirling Moss and the various different Coopers.

The first heat, held in the dry, was won by Moss from Brabham and Trintignant. The second heat, held in wet conditions at the start, which did not suit the Porsche, was won by Brabham from Trintignant and Moss. This gave the overall win to Brabahm, from Moss and Trintignant.

==== Race 4: Aintree 200 ====
In Aintree, Moss and Porsche were able to make up for their bad luck in earlier races and finally gain a championship win, locking out the podium. Moss made a poor start from pole, with the lead going to Brabham for much of the race, followed initially by Roy Salvadori (in a private Cooper), who was soon overtaken by Innes Ireland in a Lotus. Ireland would however misjudge his braking point at Tatts corner, taking some time to get going again. So then for the next several laps Brabham led Salvadori, followed quite some distance back by Graham Hill in one of the factory Porsches. The battle for third place was fierce, with eventually Moss in his Rob Walker Porsche pulling away from the factory Porsches, and the Lotuses struggling. On lap 26, however, first Brabham, and then Salvadori came into the pits, both with engine trouble, giving the lead to Moss. Moss led to the finish, although Jo Bonnier in the other factory Porsche came within a few seconds of him by the end of the race, with Hill in third and John Surtees in fourth in the first of the Coopers.

== Formula Two Constructors' Championship final standings ==
Pos.	Manufacturer	Syr	Hey	Pau	Ain	Nür	Total
1=	(United Kingdom) Cooper	6	8	8	(3)	4	26 (29)
1=	(West Germany) Porsche		6	4	8	8	26
3	(Italy) Ferrari	8					8
4	(United Kingdom) Lotus	3					3

Championship points were awarded for the first six places in each race in the order of 8-6-4-3-2-1. Manufacturers were only awarded points for their highest finishing car with no points awarded for positions filled by additional cars. Only the best four results out of the five races could be retained by each manufacturer. Points earned but not counted towards the championship totals are listed within brackets in the above table.

== Formula Two Drivers' Championship final standings ==
Pos.	Driver	Syr	Hey	Pau	Ain	Nür	Total
1	(Australia) Jack Brabham		8	8		4	20
2	(France) Maurice Trintignant	6	4	6	2		18
3=	(West Germany) Wolfgang von Trips	8				6	14
3=	(United Kingdom) Stirling Moss		6		8		14
3=	(Sweden) Jo Bonnier				6	8	14
6	(Belgium) Olivier Gendebien	4	1	4			9
7	(United Kingdom) Graham Hill				4	3	7
8	(Belgium) Paul Frère	2	2	1			5
9=	(United Kingdom) Innes Ireland	3					3
9=	(United States) Harry Schell		3				3
9=	(United Kingdom) Ron Flockhart			3			3
9=	(United Kingdom) John Surtees				3		3
13=	(United Kingdom) Tony Marsh			2			2
13=	(West Germany) Hans Herrmann					2	2
15=	(France) Jo Schlesser	1					1
15=	(United Kingdom) Chris Bristow				1		1
15=	(West Germany) Edgar Barth					1	1

Championship points were awarded for the first six places in each race in the order of 8-6-4-3-2-1. Only the best 4 results out of the 5 races could be retained by each driver, however no driver scored points in more than four races.

== Non-championship race results ==
Other Formula Two races also held in 1960, which did not count towards the championships.

Race Name	Circuit	Date	Winning driver	Constructor	Report
(South Africa) South African Grand Prix	East London	1 January	(Belgium) Paul Frère	(United Kingdom) Cooper-Climax	Report
(United Kingdom) Oulton Park Trophy	Oulton Park	2 April	(United Kingdom) Innes Ireland	(United Kingdom) Lotus-Climax	Report
(United Kingdom) Lavant Cup	Goodwood	18 April	(United Kingdom) Innes Ireland	(United Kingdom) Lotus-Climax	Report
(United Kingdom) Norfolk Trophy	Snetterton	24 April	(New Zealand) George Lawton	(United Kingdom) Cooper-Climax	Report
(United Kingdom)	Oulton Park	8 May	(United Kingdom) Roy Salvadori	(United Kingdom) Cooper-Climax	Report
(France) Prix de Paris	Montlhéry	15 May	(France) Maurice Trintignant	(United Kingdom) Cooper-Climax	Report
(Belgium) Grand Prix des Frontières	Chimay	5 June	(United Kingdom) Jack Lewis	(United Kingdom) Cooper-Climax	Report
(United Kingdom) Crystal Palace Trophy	Crystal Palace	6 June	(United Kingdom) Trevor Taylor	(United Kingdom) Lotus-Climax	Report
(West Germany) Solitude Grand Prix	Solitudering	24 July	(West Germany) Wolfgang von Trips	(Italy) Ferrari	Report
(United Kingdom) Vanwall Trophy	Snetterton	6 August	(United Kingdom) Mike McKee	(United Kingdom) Cooper-Climax	Report
(United Kingdom) Kentish 100	Brands Hatch	27 August	(United Kingdom) Jim Clark	(United Kingdom) Lotus-Climax	Report
(Denmark) Copenhagen Grand Prix	Roskilde Ring	11 September	(Australia) Jack Brabham	(United Kingdom) Cooper-Climax	Report
(United Kingdom) Lombank Trophy	Snetterton	17 September	(United Kingdom) Jack Lewis	(United Kingdom) Cooper-Climax	Report
(Austria) Flugplatzrennen	Zeltweg	18 September	(United Kingdom) Stirling Moss	(West Germany) Porsche	Report
(Italy) Modena Grand Prix	Modena	2 October	(Sweden) Jo Bonnier	(West Germany) Porsche	Report
(France) Coupe du Salon	Montlhéry	9 October	(United Kingdom) Jack Lewis	(United Kingdom) Cooper-Climax	Report
