= 2013 Pau Grand Prix =

Race details
Date	20 May 2013
Official name	72nd Pau Grand Prix
Location	Circuit de Pau-Ville, Pau
Course	Temporary street circuit 2.760 km (1.715 mi)
Distance	Qualifying Race; 20 laps, 55.200 km (34.300 mi); Main Race; 20 laps, 55.200 km (34.300 mi)
Weather	Qualifying Race: Main Race:
- Qualifying Race

Pole
Driver	(United Kingdom) Matt Parry	Fortec Motorsports
Time	1:25.062

Fastest Lap
Driver	(Italy) Luca Ghiotto	Prema Powerteam
Time	1:16.934 (on lap 19)

Podium
First	(United Kingdom) Matt Parry	Fortec Motorsports
Second	(United Kingdom) Jake Dennis	Fortec Motorsports
Third	(United Kingdom) Oliver Rowland	Manor MP Motorsport
- Main Race

Pole
Driver	(United Kingdom) Matt Parry	Fortec Motorsports

Fastest Lap
Driver	(France) Pierre Gasly	Tech 1 Racing
Time	1:14.087 (on lap 17)

Podium
First	(Italy) Luca Ghiotto	Prema Powerteam
Second	(Russia) Egor Orudzhev	Tech 1 Racing
Third	(United Kingdom) Jake Dennis	Fortec Motorsports

The 72nd Grand Prix Automobile de Pau (Pau Grand Prix) was held around as held around the streets of the city of Pau, Pyrénées-Atlantiques, south-western France, on 19 May 2013.

Luca Ghiotto won the race, starting from sixth position.

== Entry list ==
All drivers used the Tatuus-Renault machine running the Eurocup Formula Renault 2.0 that season.

Team	No.	Driver name	Main series
(United Kingdom) Fortec Motorsports	1	(United Kingdom) Jake Dennis	Eurocup Formula Renault 2.0
(United Kingdom) Fortec Motorsports	2	(United Kingdom) Matt Parry	Formula Renault 2.0 NEC
(United Kingdom) Fortec Motorsports	3	(Mexico) Alfonso Celis Jr.	Formula Renault 2.0 NEC
(France) Tech 1 Racing	5	(Russia) Egor Orudzhev	Eurocup Formula Renault 2.0; Formula Renault 2.0 Alps
(France) Tech 1 Racing	6	(France) Matthieu Vaxivière	Formula Renault 2.0 Alps
(France) Tech 1 Racing	7	(France) Pierre Gasly	Eurocup Formula Renault 2.0
(Netherlands) Manor MP Motorsport	8	(United Kingdom) Oliver Rowland	Eurocup Formula Renault 2.0
(Italy) Prema Powerteam	10	(Italy) Luca Ghiotto	Eurocup Formula Renault 2.0; Formula Renault 2.0 Alps
(Italy) Prema Powerteam	11	(Brazil) Bruno Bonifacio	Eurocup Formula Renault 2.0; Formula Renault 2.0 Alps
(Spain) AV Formula	14	(France) Tristan Papavoine	none
(France) Formula Motorsport	15	(France) Nicolas Pironneau	none
(France) Formula Motorsport	16	(France) Marc Cattaneo	V de V Challenge Monoplace

== Race results ==
=== Qualifying ===
Pos	No.	Driver name	Team	Time	Gap	Grid
1	2	(United Kingdom) Matt Parry	Fortec Motorsports	1:25.062		1
2	11	(Brazil) Bruno Bonifacio	Prema Powerteam	1:25.097	+0.035	2
3	1	(United Kingdom) Jake Dennis	Fortec Motorsports	1:25.337	+0.275	3
4	10	(Italy) Luca Ghiotto	Prema Powerteam	1:25.385	+0.323	4
5	8	(United Kingdom) Oliver Rowland	Manor MP Motorsport	1:25.468	+0.406	5
6	6	(France) Matthieu Vaxivière	Tech 1 Racing	1:25.828^{1}	+0.766	6
7	7	(France) Pierre Gasly	Tech 1 Racing	1:25.969	+0.907	7
8	5	(Russia) Egor Orudzhev	Tech 1 Racing	1:25.984	+0.922	8
9	3	(Mexico) Alfonso Celis Jr.	Fortec Motorsports	1:26.392	+1.330	9
10	14	(France) Tristan Papavoine	AV Formula	1:27.523	+2.461	10
11	15	(France) Nicolas Pironneau	Formula Motorsport	1:28.485	+3.423	11
12	16	(France) Marc Cattaneo	Formula Motorsport	1:31.746^{1}	+6.684	12

Notes:

- ^1 – Matthieu Vaxivière and Marc Cattaneo's best laps time were deleted.

=== Qualification Race ===
Pos	No.	Driver name	Team	Laps	Time/Retired	Grid
1	2	(United Kingdom) Matt Parry	Fortec Motorsports	20	26:45.714	1
2	1	(United Kingdom) Jake Dennis	Fortec Motorsports	20	+7.476	3
3	8	(United Kingdom) Oliver Rowland	Manor MP Motorsport	20	+7.827	5
4	6	(France) Matthieu Vaxivière	Tech 1 Racing	20	+8.140	6
5	11	(Brazil) Bruno Bonifacio	Prema Powerteam	20	+9.069	2
6	10	(Italy) Luca Ghiotto	Prema Powerteam	20	+10.230	4
7	7	(France) Pierre Gasly	Tech 1 Racing	20	+12.244	7
8	5	(Russia) Egor Orudzhev	Tech 1 Racing	20	+20.714	8
9	3	(Mexico) Alfonso Celis Jr.	Fortec Motorsports	20	+28.436	9
10	14	(France) Tristan Papavoine	AV Formula	19	+1 lap	10
11	16	(France) Marc Cattaneo	Formula Motorsport	18	+2 laps	12
12	15	(France) Nicolas Pironneau	Formula Motorsport	18	+2 laps	11
Fastest lap: Luca Ghiotto, 1:16.934, 129.1 km/h (80.2 mph) on lap 19

=== Race ===
Pos	No.	Driver name	Team	Laps	Time/Retired	Grid
1	10	(Italy) Luca Ghiotto	Prema Powerteam	20	44:18.805	6
2	5	(Russia) Egor Orudzhev	Tech 1 Racing	20	+1.968	8
3	1	(United Kingdom) Jake Dennis	Fortec Motorsports	20	+4.236	2
4	8	(France) Oliver Rowland	Manor MP Motorsport	20	+5.117	3
5	2	(United Kingdom) Matt Parry	Fortec Motorsports	20	+10.942	1
6	11	(Brazil) Bruno Bonifacio	Prema Powerteam	20	+34.979	5
7	7	(France) Pierre Gasly	Tech 1 Racing	20	+38.483	7
8	14	(France) Tristan Papavoine	AV Formula	20	+58.011	10
9	15	(France) Nicolas Pironneau	Formula Motorsport	20	+2:09.615	12
Ret	6	(France) Matthieu Vaxivière	Tech 1 Racing	6	Retired	4
Ret	16	(France) Marc Cattaneo	Formula Motorsport	5	Retired	11
Ret	3	(Mexico) Alfonso Celis Jr.	Fortec Motorsports	0	Retired	9
Fastest lap: Pierre Gasly, 1:14.087, 134.1 km/h (83.3 mph) on lap 17
