= 2016 Pau Grand Prix =

Race details
- Date: 15 May 2016
- Official name: LXXV Pau Grand Prix
- Location: Pau, France
- Course: Temporary Street Circuit
- Course length: 2.760 km (1.720 miles)
- Distance: 25 laps, 69.000 km (42.874 miles)

Pole position
Driver	(Italy) Alessio Lorandi	Carlin
- Time: 1:21.586

Fastest lap
Driver	(United Kingdom) George Russell	HitechGP
- Time: 1:10.950 on lap 19

Podium
First	(Italy) Alessio Lorandi	Carlin
Second	(Canada) Lance Stroll	Prema Powerteam
Third	(United Kingdom) George Russell	HitechGP

The 2016 Pau Grand Prix was a Formula Three motor race held on 15 May 2016 at the Pau circuit, in Pau, Pyrénées-Atlantiques, France. The Grand Prix was run as the third round of the 2016 European Formula 3 Championship and was won by Alessio Lorandi, driving for Carlin. Lance Stroll finished second and George Russell third.

== Entry list ==
Team	No.	Driver	Chassis	Engine
(Italy) Prema Powerteam	1	(Canada) Lance Stroll	F316/002	Mercedes
(Italy) Prema Powerteam	2	(New Zealand) Nick Cassidy	F314/015	Mercedes
(Italy) Prema Powerteam	16	(Estonia) Ralf Aron	F315/005	Mercedes
(Italy) Prema Powerteam	17	(Germany) Maximilian Günther	F315/006	Mercedes
(United Kingdom) Carlin	3	(United States) Ryan Tveter	F316/014	Volkswagen
(United Kingdom) Carlin	4	(Italy) Alessio Lorandi	F315/016	Volkswagen
(United Kingdom) Carlin	18	(China) Zhi Cong Li	F314/020	Volkswagen
(Netherlands) Van Amersfoort Racing	5	(Brazil) Pedro Piquet	F316/009	Mercedes
(Netherlands) Van Amersfoort Racing	6	(United Kingdom) Callum Ilott	F312/043	Mercedes
(Netherlands) Van Amersfoort Racing	20	(United Kingdom) Harrison Newey	F316/010	Mercedes
(Netherlands) Van Amersfoort Racing	21	(France) Anthoine Hubert	F314/009	Mercedes
(Germany) kfzteile24 Mücke Motorsport	7	(Denmark) Mikkel Jensen	F316/007	Mercedes
(Germany) kfzteile24 Mücke Motorsport	8	(Germany) David Beckmann	F316/012	Mercedes
(Germany) Motopark	9	(Brazil) Sérgio Sette Câmara	F314/018	Volkswagen
(Germany) Motopark	10	(Finland) Niko Kari	F315/003	Volkswagen
(Germany) Motopark	22	(Sweden) Joel Eriksson	F315/007	Volkswagen
(Germany) Motopark	23	(China) Guanyu Zhou	F314/016	Volkswagen
(United Kingdom) HitechGP	11	(Russia) Nikita Mazepin	F315/009	Mercedes
(United Kingdom) HitechGP	12	(United Kingdom) George Russell	F315/010	Mercedes
(United Kingdom) HitechGP	24	(United Kingdom) Ben Barnicoat	F316/006	Mercedes
(United Kingdom) Threebond with T-Sport	14	(India) Arjun Maini	F314/019	NBE

== Classification ==
=== Race ===
Pos	No	Driver	Vehicle	Laps	Time/Retired	Grid
1	4	(Italy) Alessio Lorandi	Carlin	25	35min 09.190sec	1
2	1	(Canada) Lance Stroll	Prema Powerteam	25	+ 0.460 s	2
3	12	(United Kingdom) George Russell	HitechGP	25	+ 2.385 s	5
4	6	(United Kingdom) Callum Ilott	Van Amersfoort Racing	25	+ 2.806 s	6
5	7	(Denmark) Mikkel Jensen	Mücke Motorsport	25	+ 6.393 s	8
6	22	(Sweden) Joel Eriksson	Motopark	25	+ 6.920 s	11
7	3	(United States) Ryan Tveter	Carlin	25	+ 12.097 s	9
8	10	(Finland) Niko Kari	Motopark	25	+ 12.599 s	14
9	14	(India) Arjun Maini	ThreeBond with T-Sport	25	+ 13.179 s	18
10	5	(Brazil) Pedro Piquet	Van Amersfoort Racing	25	+ 22.901 s	16
11	24	(United Kingdom) Ben Barnicoat	HitechGP	25	+ 25.011 s	7
12	21	(France) Anthoine Hubert	Van Amersfoort Racing	25	+ 29.981 s	10
13	17	(Germany) Maximilian Günther	Prema Powerteam	25	+ 35.100 s	21
14	20	(United Kingdom) Harrison Newey	Van Amersfoort Racing	25	+ 39.856 s	17
15	16	(Estonia) Ralf Aron	Prema Powerteam	25	+ 44.042 s	13
Ret	23	(China) Guanyu Zhou	Motopark	21	Retired	20
Ret	11	(Russia) Nikita Mazepin	HitechGP	1	Retired	15
Ret	9	(Brazil) Sérgio Sette Câmara	Motopark	0	Accident	3
Ret	2	(New Zealand) Nick Cassidy	Prema Powerteam	0	Accident	4
Ret	8	(Germany) David Beckmann	Mücke Motorsport	0	Accident	12
Ret	18	(China) Zhi Cong Li	Carlin	0	Accident	19

Preceded by 2015 Pau Grand Prix	Pau Grand Prix; 2016	Succeeded by 2017 Pau Grand Prix
