= 1977 Pau Grand Prix =

Race details
- Date: 30 May 1977
- Official name: XXXVII Pau Grand Prix
- Location: Pau, France
- Course: Temporary Street Circuit
- Course length: 2.760 km (1.720 miles)
- Distance: 59 laps, 167.206 km (103.896 miles)

Pole position
Driver	(France) Patrick Tambay	Martini-Renault
- Time: 1:13.38

Fastest lap
Driver	(France) Didier Pironi	Martini-Renault
- Time: 1:14.57

Podium
First	(France) René Arnoux	Martini-Renault
Second	(France) Didier Pironi	Martini-Renault
Third	(Italy) Riccardo Patrese	Chevron-BMW

The 1977 Pau Grand Prix was a Formula Two motor race held on 30 May 1977 at the Pau circuit, in Pau, Pyrénées-Atlantiques, France. The Grand Prix was won by René Arnoux, driving the Martini MK22. Didier Pironi finished second and Riccardo Patrese third.

With the race initially being run at 73 laps, the race was stopped after 59 laps after colossal rain made the circuit virtually undrivable.

== Classification ==
=== Race ===
Pos	No	Driver	Vehicle	Laps	Time/retired	Grid
1	4	(France) René Arnoux	Martini-Renault	59	1hr 14min 52.52sec	
2	5	(France) Didier Pironi	Martini-Renault	59	+ 0.42 s	
3	17	(Italy) Riccardo Patrese	Chevron-BMW	59	+ 18.54 s	
4	28	(Italy) Alberto Colombo	March-BMW	58	+ 1 lap	
5	25	(Italy) Gaudenzio Mantova	March-BMW	58	+ 1 lap	
6	32	(Argentina) Ricardo Zunino	March-Hart	57	+ 2 laps	
7	9	(Germany) Klaus Ludwig	Kauhsen-Renault	57	+ 2 laps	
8	16	(Brazil) Ingo Hoffmann	Ralt-BMW	56	+ 3 laps	
9	26	(United Kingdom) Brian Henton	Boxer-Hart	56	+ 3 laps	
10	1	(France) Jacques Laffite	Chevron-Hart	56	+ 3 laps	
11	21	(Finland) Keke Rosberg	Chevron-Hart	55	+ 4 laps	
12	11	(Italy) Gianfranco Brancatelli	Ralt-Ferrari	54	+ 5 laps	
13	34	(Sweden) Freddy Kottulinsky	Ralt-BMW	54	+ 5 laps	
Ret	33	(Italy) Alessandro Pesenti-Rossi	March-BMW	34	Fuel pressure	
Ret	3	(Italy) Bruno Giacomelli	March-BMW	26	Suspension	
Ret	8	(France) Michel Leclère	Kauhsen-Renault	21	Steering	
Ret	10	(Italy) Giancarlo Martini	Martini-Renault	12	Accident	
Ret	36	(France) Patrick Tambay	Chevron-Hart	0	Accident	
Ret	38	(France) Xavier Lapeyre	Martini-BMW	0	Accident	
Ret	15	(United States) Eddie Cheever	Ralt-BMW	0	Accident	
DNQ	12	(Italy) Lamberto Leoni	Ralt-Ferrari		Did not qualify	
DNQ	22	(United States) Wink Bancroft	Chevron-Hart		Did not qualify	
DNQ	23	(France) Michel Pignard	Chevron-Chrysler		Did not qualify	
DNQ	24	(United Kingdom) Norman Dickson	March-BMW		Did not qualify	
DNQ	27	(Belgium) Bernard de Dryver	March-BMW		Did not qualify	
Fastest Lap: Didier Pironi (Martini-Renault) - 1:14.57

Preceded by 1976 Pau Grand Prix	Pau Grand Prix; 1977	Succeeded by 1978 Pau Grand Prix
