= 1949 Pau Grand Prix =

Race details
- Date: 18 April 1949
- Official name: X Grand Prix Automobile de Pau
- Location: Pau, France
- Course: Temporary Street Circuit
- Course length: 2.760 km (1.720 miles)
- Distance: 110 laps, 304.590 km (189.263 miles)

Pole position
Driver	(Argentina) Juan Manuel Fangio	Maserati 4CLT/48
- Time: 1:47.3

Fastest lap
Driver	(Argentina) Juan Manuel Fangio	Maserati 4CLT/48
- Time: 1:49.0

Podium
First	(Argentina) Juan Manuel Fangio	Maserati 4CLT/48
Second	(Switzerland) Toulo de Graffenried	Maserati 4CLT/48
Third	(Argentina) Benedicto Campos	Maserati 4CLT/48

The 1949 Pau Grand Prix was a non-championship Formula One motor race held on 18 April 1949 at the Pau circuit, in Pau, Pyrénées-Atlantiques, France. The Grand Prix was won by Juan Manuel Fangio, driving the Maserati 4CLT/48. Toulo de Graffenried finished second and Benedicto Campos third.

== Classification ==
=== Race ===
Pos	No	Driver	Vehicle	Laps	Time/Retired	Grid
1	4	(Argentina) Juan Manuel Fangio	Maserati 4CLT/48	110	3hrs 36min 11.9sec	1
2	12	(Switzerland) Toulo de Graffenried	Maserati 4CLT/48	110	+ 16.8 s	
3	6	(Argentina) Benedicto Campos	Maserati 4CLT/48	109	+ 1 lap	
4	20	(Monaco) Louis Chiron (France) Guy Mairesse	Talbot-Lago T26C	108	+ 2 laps	
5	16	(France) Maurice Trintignant	Simca-Gordini T15	107	+ 3 laps	
6	28	(France) Yves Giraud-Cabantous (France) Georges Grignard	Talbot-Lago T26C	91	+ 19 laps	
Ret	24	(France) Louis Rosier (France) Eugène Chaboud	Talbot-Lago T26C	109	Engine	
Ret	18	(France) Robert Manzon	Simca-Gordini T15	98	Mechanical	
Ret	14	(Italy) Nello Pagani	Maserati 4CLT/48	46	Starter ring	
Ret	26	(United States) Harry Schell	Talbot-Lago T26C	23	Engine	
Ret	30	(France) Pierre Levegh	Talbot-Lago T26C		Overheating	
Ret	22	(France) Guy Mairesse	Talbot-Lago T26C	9	Oil leak	
Ret	2	(France) Philippe Étancelin	Talbot-Lago T26C	9	Suspension	
Ret	8	(France) Eugène Chaboud	Maserati 4CL	4	Engine	
Fastest Lap: Juan Manuel Fangio (Maserati 4CLT/48) – 1:49.0

Preceded by 1948 Pau Grand Prix	Pau Grand Prix; 1949	Succeeded by 1950 Pau Grand Prix
