= 1984 Pau Grand Prix =

Race details
- Date: 11 June 1984
- Official name: XLIV Pau Grand Prix
- Location: Pau, France
- Course: Temporary Street Circuit
- Course length: 2.760 km (1.720 miles)
- Distance: 73 laps, 206.882 km (128.550 miles)

Pole position
Driver	(New Zealand) Mike Thackwell	Ralt-Honda
- Time: 1:10.51

Fastest lap
Driver	(New Zealand) Mike Thackwell	Ralt-Honda
- Time: 1:12.65

Podium
First	(New Zealand) Mike Thackwell	Ralt-Honda
Second	(France) Philippe Streiff	AGS-BMW
Third	(Brazil) Roberto Moreno	Ralt-Honda

The 44th Grand Prix Automobile de Pau (Pau Grand Prix), was the sixth round of the 1984 European Championship for F2 Drivers. This race was held around the streets of the city of Pau, Pyrénées-Atlantiques, south-western France, on 11 June.

== Report ==
=== Entry ===
For this round, the entry was down to just 19 cars. Prior to qualifying, the Minardi Team withdrawn an entry, no driver was available.

=== Qualifying ===
Mike Thackwell took pole position for Ralt Racing Ltd, in their Ralt-Honda RH6, averaging a speed of 89.922 mph.

=== Race ===
The race was held over 73 laps of the Circuit de Pau-Ville. Mike Thackwell took the winner spoils for works Ralt team, driving their Ralt-Honda RH6. The Kiwi won in a time of 1hr 29:39.73mins., averaging a speed of 86.024 mph. Second place went to Frenchman, Philippe Streiff aboard the AGS Elf (Armagnac Bigorre) entered AGS-BMW JH19C, who was over 40 seconds adrift. The podium was completed by the second works Ralt-Honda of Brazilian, Roberto Moreno.

== Classification ==
=== Race result ===
Pos.	No.	Driver	Entrant	Car - Engine	Time, Laps	Reason Out
1st	1	(New Zealand) Mike Thackwell	Ralt Racing Ltd	Ralt-Honda RH6	1hr 29:39.73	
2nd	6	(France) Philippe Streiff	AGS Elf (Armagnac Bigorre)	AGS-BMW JH19C	1hr 30:20.59	
3rd	2	(Brazil) Roberto Moreno	Ralt Racing Ltd	Ralt-Honda RH6	1hr 30:23.45	
4th	66	(Germany) Christian Danner	PMC Motorsport / BS Automotive	March-BMW 842	1hr 30:41.70	
5th	18	(France) Alain Ferté	Martini Racing, France/ORECA	Martini-BMW 002	1hr 30:48.82	
6th	5	(France) Pierre Petit	Onyx Race Engineering	March-BMW 842	72	
7th	33	(France) Pascal Fabre	PMC Motorsport / BS Automotive	March-BMW 842	72	
8th	15	(Italy) Guido Daccò	Sanremo Racing Srl	March-BMW 832	70	
9th	30	(France) Marcel Tarrès	Marcel Tarres	Martini-BMW 43	69	
10th	22	(Switzerland) Max Busslinger	Merzario Team Srl	Merzario-BMW M84	67	
DNF	8	(Austria) ”Pierre Chauvet”	Emco Sports	March-BMW 842	61	Spin / Engine
DNF	4	(Italy) Emanuele Pirro	Onyx Race Engineering	March-BMW 842	54	Engine
DNF	21	(Italy) Stefano Livio	Merzario Team Srl	Merzario-BMW M84	25	Wheel
DNF	10	(Italy) Alessandro Nannini	Minardi Team	Minardi-BMW M283	19	Puncture
DNF	44	(Switzerland) Bert Jans	PMC Motorsport / BS Automotive	March-BMW 842	16	Engine
DNF	3	(Belgium) Thierry Tassin	Onyx Race Engineering	March-BMW 842	15	Accident
DNF	17	(France) Michel Ferté	Martini Racing, France/ORECA	Martini-BMW 001	12	Accident
DNF	9	(Italy) Roberto Del Castello	Minardi Team	Minardi-BMW M283	8	Accident

- Fastest lap: Mike Thackwell, 1:12.65secs. (87.261 mph)
