= Formula Two =

Formula car racing class

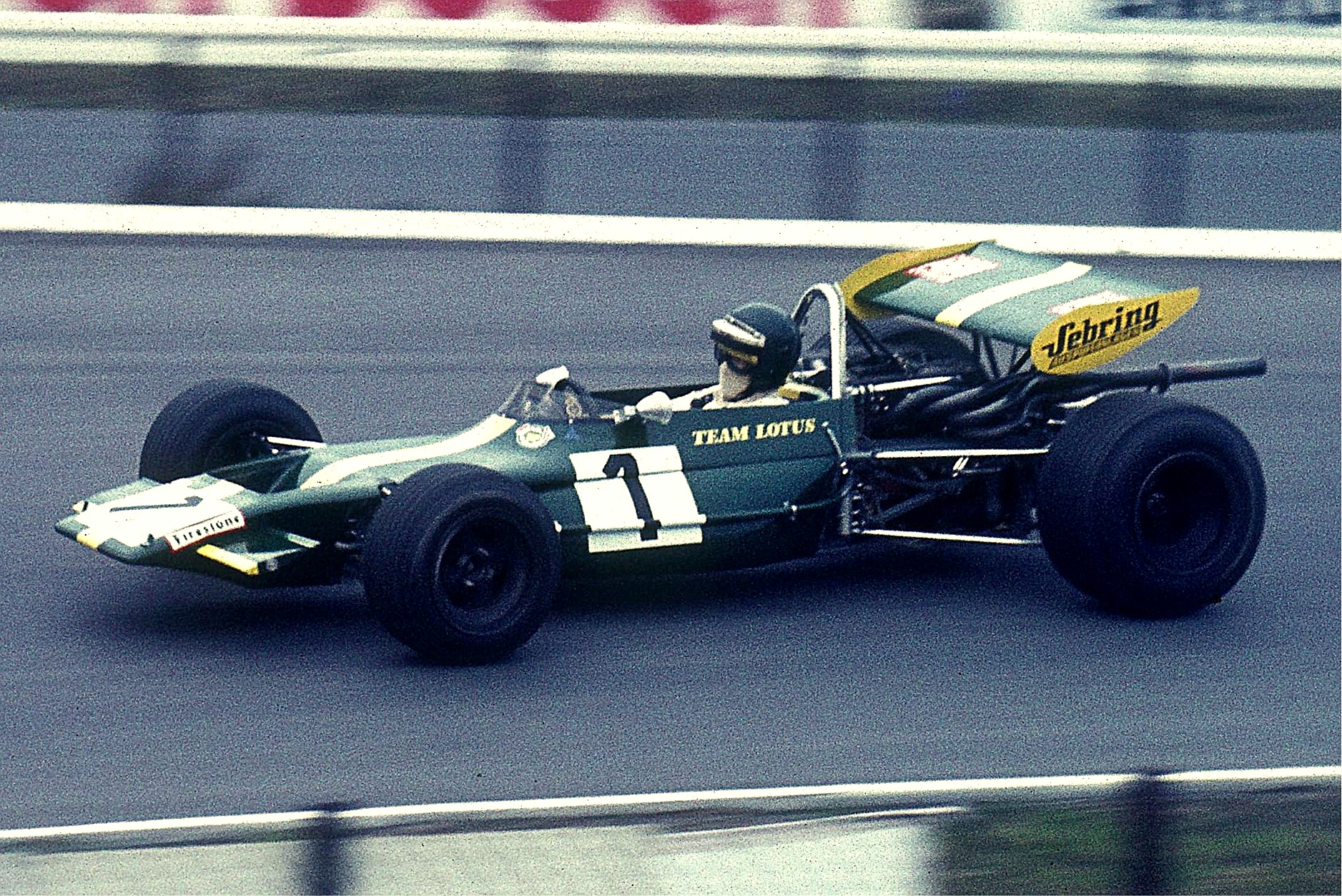
Jochen Rindt driving a Formula 2 Lotus in 1970 at the Nürburgring

Formula Two (F2) is a type of open-wheel formula racing category first codified in 1948. It was replaced in 1985 by Formula 3000, but revived by the FIA from 2009 to 2012 in the form of the FIA Formula Two Championship. The name returned again in 2017 when the former GP2 Series became known as the FIA Formula 2 Championship.

== History ==
While Formula One has generally been regarded as the pinnacle of open-wheeled auto racing, the high-performance nature of the cars and the expense involved in the series has always meant a need for a path to reach this peak. For much of the history of Formula One, Formula Two has represented the penultimate step on the motorsport ladder.

=== Pre-war ===
Prior to the Second World War, there usually existed a division of racing for cars smaller and less powerful than Grand Prix racers. This category was usually called voiturette ("small car") racing and provided a means for amateur or less experienced drivers and smaller marques to prove themselves. By the outbreak of war, the rules for voiturette racing permitted 1.5 L supercharged engines; Grand Prix cars were permitted 3.0 L supercharged or 4.5 L naturally aspirated.

=== Official beginnings (post war–1953) ===
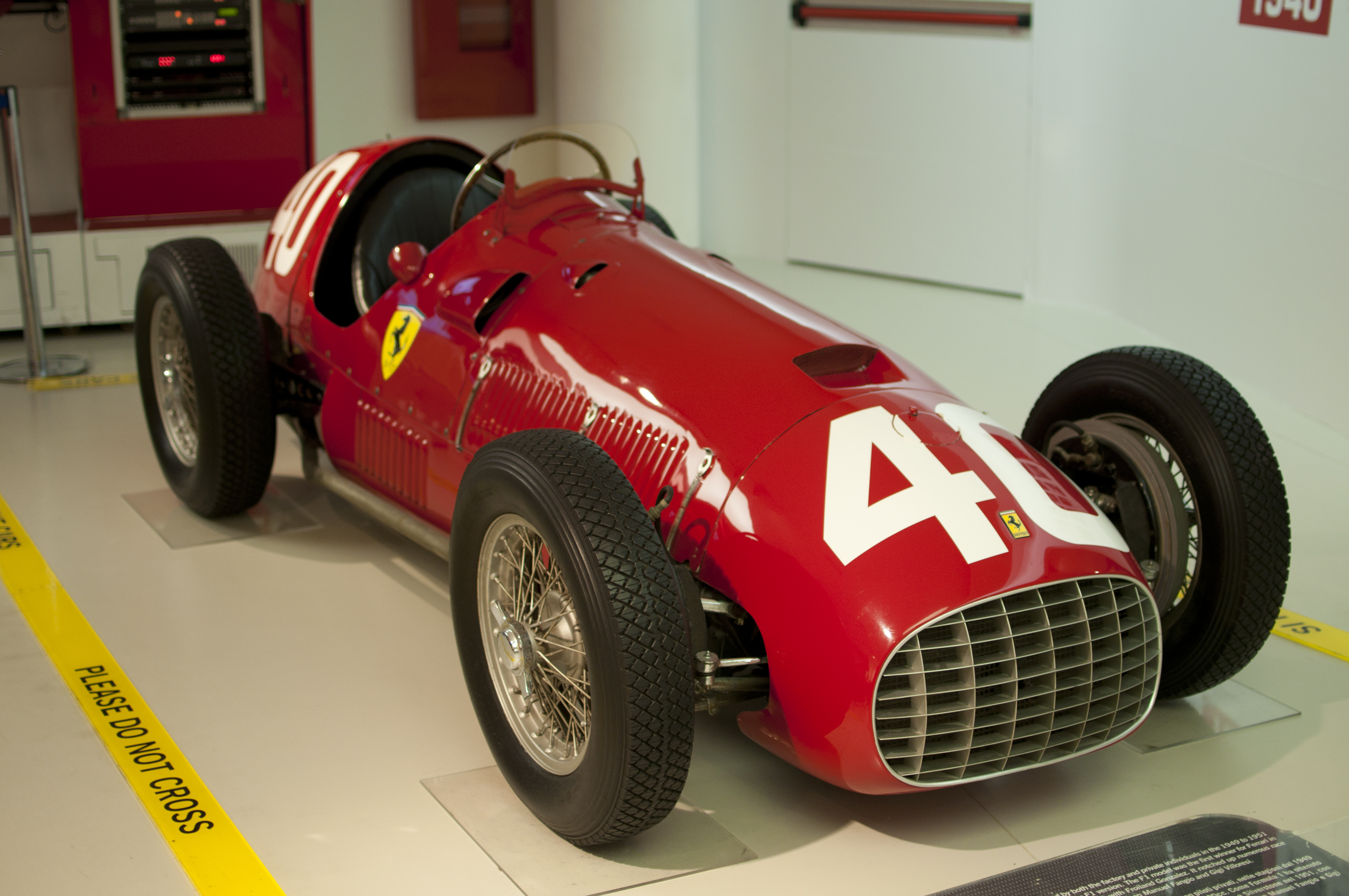
Ferrari 166 F2

In 1946, the 3.0 L supercharged rules were abandoned and Formulas A and B (later 1 and 2) introduced, effective from 1 January 1947. Formula A permitted the old 4.5 L naturally aspirated cars, but as the 3.0 L supercharged cars were more than a match for these (and the pre-War German and Italian cars were no longer available), the old 1.5 L voiturette formula replaced 3.0 L supercharged cars in an attempt to equalise performance.

This left no category below Formula A/Formula One, so Formula Two (originally known as Formula B) was first formally codified by the FIA as a smaller and cheaper complement to the Grand Prix cars of the era to be effective from 1 January 1948. Among the races held in this first year of Formula Two was the 1948 Stockholm Grand Prix.

In 1948 Scuderia Ferrari built the Ferrari 166 F2, which made its racing debut at the Florence Grand Prix on September 26, 1948.

The rules limited engines to two-litre naturally aspirated or 500 cc supercharged (an option very rarely used). As a result, the cars were smaller, lighter, and cheaper than those used in Formula One. This encouraged new marques such as Cooper to move up to Formula Two, before competing against large manufacturers like Alfa Romeo and Maserati.

In fact, Formula One in its early years attracted so few entrants that in 1952 and 1953 all World Championship Grand Prix races, except the unique Indianapolis 500, were run in Formula Two (there were, however, non-championship Formula One events).

=== 1.5-litre era (1957–1960) ===
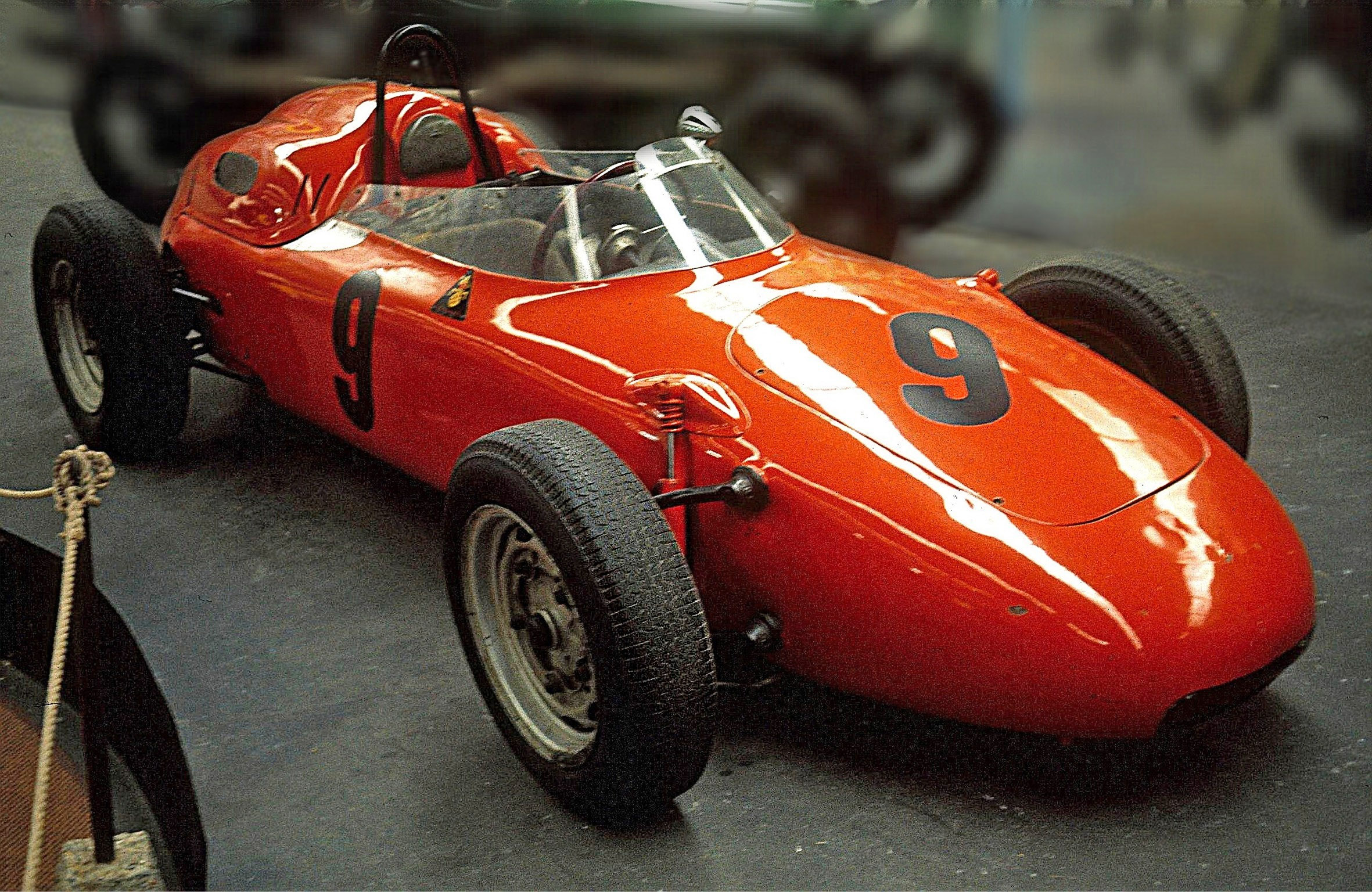
1.5-litre Porsche 718

F2 went into decline with the arrival of the 2.5 L F1 in 1954 (with small-capacity sports car racing becoming particularly popular), but a new Formula Two was introduced for 1957, for 1.5 L cars. This became dominated by rear-engined Coopers drawing on their Formula 3 and "Bobtail" sports car, with Porsches based on their RSK sports cars enjoying some success. Ferrari originally developed their "Sharknose" Dino 156 as a Formula Two car, while still racing front-engined Grand Prix cars. The dominant engine of this formula was the Coventry Climax FPF four-cylinder, with the rare Borgward 1500 RS fuel-injected sixteen-valve unit enjoying some success.

A slightly enlarged Climax engine in the F2 Cooper won the first two Formula One Grands Prix in 1958, marking the beginning of the rear mid engine era in Formula One.

The 1.5 L Formula 2 was short-lived but did not really end in 1960 as it was upgraded to Formula 1 from 1961 to 1965. In that time Formula Junior effectively replaced first Formula Three and then Formula Two until 1963. For 1960, in preparation for the new Formula One, two international championships were held, the Formula Two Constructors' Championship and the Formula Two Drivers' Championship. The Drivers' Championship was won by Jack Brabham, while the Manufacturers' Championship ended in a tie between Porsche and Cooper.

=== Formula Junior (1961–1963) and 1-litre Formula Two (1964–1966) ===
Formula Junior was introduced in 1959, an attempt to be all things to all people (both a training formula replacing Formula Three and a high-level international category below Formula One replacing Formula Two), and it was soon realised that there was a need to split it into two new formulae; Formula Two and Formula Three were reintroduced for the 1964 season, with Formula Three requiring one-litre production-based engines, which were similar to Formula Junior with very restricted tuning, and Formula Two also having a 1.0 L engine size, but permitting pure-bred racing engines. Formula Two was largely the domain of Formula One stars on their days off. Engines were mostly by Cosworth (based on Ford blocks) and Honda, though some other units appeared, including various Fiat based units and dedicated racing engines from BMC and BRM.

=== 1.6-litre era and driver grading (1967–1971) ===
For 1967, the FIA increased the maximum engine capacity to 1600cc. With the "return to power" of Formula One the gap between Formula One and Formula Two was felt to be too wide, and the introduction of new 1600cc production-based engine regulations for Formula Two restored the category to its intended role as a feeder series for Formula One. The FIA also introduced the European Formula Two Championship in 1967. Ickx, driving a Matra MS5, won the inaugural championship by 11 points from the Australian, Frank Gardner.

The most popular 1600cc engine was the Cosworth FVA, the sixteen-valve head on a four-cylinder Cortina block that was effectively the "proof of concept" for the legendary DFV. The 1967 FVA gave 220 bhp (160 kW; 220 PS) at 9000 rpm. Other units also appeared, including a four-cylinder BMW and a V6 Dino Ferrari.

Nevertheless, many Formula One drivers continued to drive the smaller and lighter cars on non-championship weekends, and some Grand Prix grids (notably in Germany, where the long circuit at the Nürburgring could cope with large entries) would be a mix of Formula One and Formula Two cars. Jacky Ickx made his Grand Prix debut at the Nürburgring in a Formula Two car in 1966. The following year Ickx qualified with the third fastest time overall but was forced to start behind the slower Formula One cars. Ickx quickly forced his way back into a points position, only to be forced to retire with broken suspension. Jim Clark, regarded as one of the greatest race drivers of all time, was killed in a Formula Two race early in 1968, at the Hockenheimring. A year later Gerhard Mitter was killed at the Nürburgring while practising for the 1969 German Grand Prix in a Formula Two car.

The "invasion" of Formula One drivers in Formula Two ranks (a situation similar to that of buschwhacking in modern-day NASCAR) was permitted because of the unique grading system used. Any driver with an A grading was not permitted to score championship points. A driver gained an A rating via various means which changed somewhat over the years, such as finishing in the points in two Grand Prix events or the top three in two World Sports Car events. The annual Formula Two champion was also granted an A rating for one year, and a Formula One World Champion was A graded for five. This system permitted less experienced drivers to work towards the championship and forward their careers, while allowing senior drivers to keep their hand in during the long breaks between Grands Prix of the time.

In the early years of the 1600cc formula, Brabham and Lotus were the most numerous constructors, although Ferrari intermittently entered a works team, as did BMW (with Lola and Dornier-built chassis). A number of smaller constructors such as Matra and Tecno were successful. Chevron also provided cars. The French firm Matra won the three first editions of the European championship, with Tecno winning the fourth.

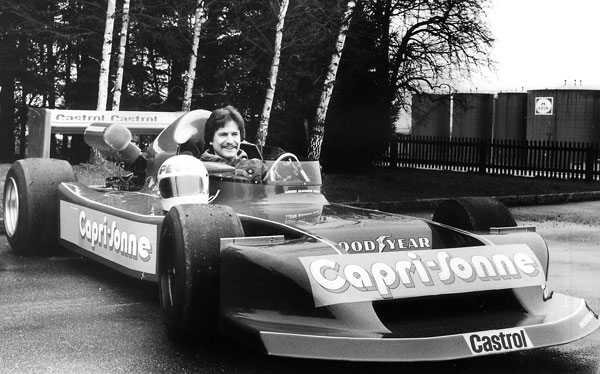
Peter Scharmann's 1978 March–BMW

=== 2.0-litre era (1972–1984) ===
In 1972, the formula was changed to increase power by permitting 2.0 L production-based engines—Cosworth BDs and BMW four-cylinder engines dominated the early years, with BMW-powered Marches gradually establishing dominance. For 1976, engines developed purely for racing were permitted to compete, with Renault developing a particularly potent V6; allied to a sponsorship scheme from oil company Elf the formula was briefly dominated by French teams and drivers; BMW started to back a works March team and raised the stakes in the late-Seventies. Even the Ferrari Dino 206 engine returned briefly, albeit with minimal success. The Hart 420R (ultimately derived from the Cosworth BDA) was briefly successful in Marches and Team Surtees won the European F2 Championship in 1972 with Hart engines, driver Mike Hailwood, but most notably in the works Toleman team's cars. Dominant chassis of this era were generally from March and Ralt, with Chevron, the French Elf and Martinis and German Maurers being briefly successful.

Honda returned to Formula Two in the early 1980s with a powerful V6, but this was very much a works engine and the cost of competing with the works Ralt-Honda team became prohibitive. As a result, grids diminished in size and declining interest in the series threatened it with extinction.

=== Superseded ===
After the 1984 season, the FIA replaced Formula Two with the newly created Formula 3000 category, which was designed to cut the cost of competition. The initial regulations joined F2-style chassis with the naturally aspirated 3000 cc Cosworth DFV V8 engines, that were by then obsolete in the all-turbocharged Formula One. The premier series was the FIA Formula 3000 International Championship, though a number of other championships were also run to Formula 3000 regulations.

=== Revival (2009–2012) ===
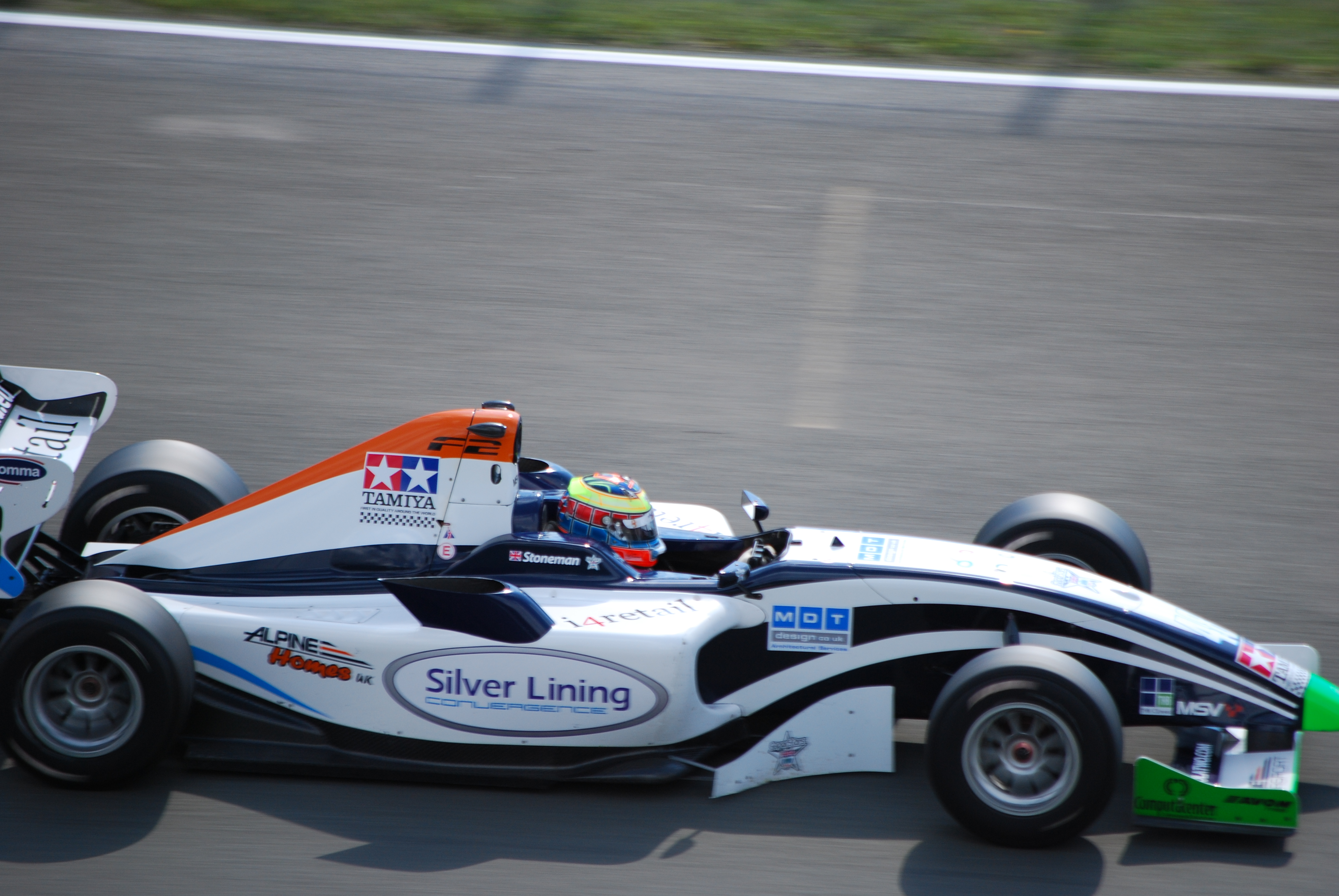
Dean Stoneman won the championship in 2010.

Following an absence of 25 years, a Formula Two championship was re-established by the FIA in 2009. Unlike the previous incarnation, the FIA Formula Two Championship was a one make series, with the competitors all using the same chassis and engine. Jonathan Palmer's MotorSport Vision company managed the championship and also operated and maintained the cars on behalf of the drivers. There were no teams in the championship – unlike other professional motorsport series each driver instead worked with engineers supplied by MotorSport Vision. The cars were designed by Williams Grand Prix Engineering, and were powered by a 1.8L turbocharged Audi engine developed by Mountune Racing, with 480 brake horsepower (358 kW; 487 PS). The cars fell between Formula One and Formula Three in performance, and cost each driver £195,000 for a season.

The 2009 championship comprised eight events in Europe between the months of May and November. There were two races per weekend – each 110 km long (around 40 minutes). Two 30-minute practice sessions and two 30-minute qualifying sessions preceded both races. The inaugural championship was won by Andy Soucek although was marred by the death of Henry Surtees during the fourth round at Brands Hatch.

The series was discontinued by the FIA and MSV after the 2012 season. The championship had struggled to attract enough drivers in the final year, with the single team concept proving to be unpopular compared to championships run on a more conventional basis. Despite being marketed as a feeder series for Formula One, the competing GP2 and Formula Renault 3.5 series had significantly more powerful cars, and no Formula Two driver had managed to progress to a Formula One team until Jolyon Palmer in 2016 with Renault Sport F1 Team.

=== Second revival (2017) ===
In 2015, the FIA announced plans to overhaul the Super Licence system, streamlining the qualification criteria and weighting the various feeder series to allow drivers a more linear progress system. Included with this were plans for a revival of the Formula Two category, which was given priority over all other categories of competition. Further details were published by the World Motorsport Council, revealing plans to model the new Formula Two championship along the same lines as the revived European Formula 3 Championship and the newly introduced Formula 4 category. The series will be a part of the FIA Global Pathway.

Rather than reviving the series by creating a new one where none had previously existed, the FIA chose to rebrand the GP2 Series as the FIA Formula 2 Championship in early 2017. However, like the series that lasted from 2009 to 2012, there has been a fatality, that being Frenchman Anthoine Hubert who was killed at the 2019 Spa-Francorchamps round after being struck by Juan Manuel Correa at a near-90° angle. Since the inception of FIA Formula 2, drivers to have graduated to F1 include Charles Leclerc, George Russell, Oscar Piastri and Gabriel Bortoleto. All eleven teams run the Dallara F2 2024 chassis, powered by a Mecachrome engine.

== Other Formula Two series ==
=== Soviet Formula 2 Championship ===
The Central Automotoclub of the USSR (CAMK) joined the FIA in October 1956, aiming to develop Soviet motorsport after seeing international races like the British F1 GP. In 1959, CAMK introduced a new classification system for racing cars in the USSR. However, F2 cars were not part of the 1960 Soviet motorsport championship because there were no suitable stock engines available, and the Soviet Union did not produce specialized racing engines at that time. Consequently, it wasn't until 1962 that the F2 category made its debut in Soviet autosport championships. Two years later, updated F2 regulations were introduced. It wasn't until 1971 that F2 cars started to regularly appear on Soviet tracks, and F2 series were included in Soviet motorsport championships until 1977.

=== Japanese Formula Two ===
Prior to the Formula Nippon, during the 1.6 L 1967–1971 era, a Formula 2 series championship existed in Japan. Japanese teams were building their own cars and engines. As for races ran in Europe, the series was simply called Formula 2. Amongst the makes, the best known was the Mitsubishi Colt. Cars raced with parallel FIA rules, using 1600 cc displacement engines, from 1967 to 1970.

Japan ran a series known as "Japanese Formula 2000 championship" to rules similar to two-litre F2 between 1973 and 1977. Production-based single-cam engines were permitted to run at 2.4 L, but they soon came into line with FIA rules in the mid-1970s. The Japanese Formula 2 championship ran between 1978 and 1986, before Japan too adopted a set of regulations very similar to F3000 rules, with the series being known as Japanese Formula 3000 from 1987. The series is now known as Super Formula, after using the name Formula Nippon from 1996 to 2012. Japan also ran a series for full-bodied versions of F2 cars called Fuji Grand Champion Series—somewhat akin to the F5000-based revival of Can-Am.

=== Australian Formula 2 ===
Australia has had its own Australian Formula 2 category since 1964. From 1978, the formula has specified that cars be powered by a production-based single-cam engine with a capacity between 1100 cc and 1600 cc. Induction must be by means of carburettor/s, the engine must be naturally aspirated and an 8500 rpm rev limit is applied.

An Australian Formula 2 Championship was sanctioned by the Confederation of Australian Motor Sport in the years from 1964 to 1965, from 1969 to 1977 and from 1979 to 1988.

=== Mexican Formula Two ===
Mexico ran its own Formula Two series (previously known as Formula K) for 12 years in the early 1990s. The cars were similar to Formula Atlantic vehicles, fitted with 2.2 L Chrysler engines.

=== British Formula Two ===
Formula Two racing was popular in the United Kingdom in the late 1940s and early 1950s. During the 2.0 litre engine era, HWM, Connaught and Cooper were among the constructors who built cars for the class, usually powered by Bristol. When F2 was brought back in 1.5 litre form in 1956, Cooper and Lotus were the first to build cars to the new specification, taking advantage of the availability of Coventry Climax engines.

Championships were held from 1956 to 1960, 1964 to 1967 and again in 1972. Stirling Moss, Jack Brabham, Jim Clark and Niki Lauda won titles.

The British Formula 3000 series was briefly known as "Formula Two" in an attempt to make its status more apparent to casual spectators. However, the series was in terminal decline and the change of name did not help. At one point the use of 4.2 L TVR engines cars in F3000 chassis was discussed as a possible British F2, but this did not materialise.

=== Trophées de France ===
Prior to formation of the European Championship, France held its own championship between 1964 and 1967. Despite only running for four seasons, the Brabham marque won three titles, with the drivers title going to Jack Brabham (twice), Jim Clark and Jochen Rindt. Races were held at Pau, Clermont-Ferrand and Reims.

However once the European Championship had successfully completed its first season, the French version was abandoned.

== Formula Two champions ==
Season	Driver	Team / car	Pole positions	Wins	Podiums	Fastest laps	Points	Margin (pnts)
1960 Formula Two season
1960	(Australia) Jack Brabham	Cooper Car Company; Cooper–Climax	1	2	3	0	20	2
European Formula Two Championship
1967	(Belgium) Jacky Ickx	Tyrrell Racing; Matra–Cosworth	2	2	4	3	45	11
1968	(France) Jean-Pierre Beltoise	Matra Sports; Matra–Cosworth	2	3	5	1	48	17
1969	(France) Johnny Servoz-Gavin	Matra International; Matra–Cosworth	1	1	2	1	37	9
1970	(Switzerland) Clay Regazzoni	Tecno Racing Team; Tecno–Cosworth	2	3	5	1	44	9
1971	(Sweden) Ronnie Peterson	March Engineering; March–Cosworth	7	4	6	5	54	14
1972	(United Kingdom) Mike Hailwood	Team Surtees; Surtees–Cosworth	1	2	5	2	55	18
1973	(France) Jean-Pierre Jarier	March Engineering; March–BMW	4	7	8	5	78	37
1974	(France) Patrick Depailler	March Engineering; March–BMW	3	4	6	2	54	11
1975	(France) Jacques Laffite	Ecurie Elf; Martini–BMW	6	6	7	4	60	24
1976	(France) Jean-Pierre Jabouille	Equipe Elf; Elf 2J–Renault	4	3	6	1	53	1
1977	(France) René Arnoux	Ecurie Renault Elf; Martini–Renault	1	3	6	1	52	12
1978	(Italy) Bruno Giacomelli	Polifac BMW Junior Team; March–BMW	8	8	10	6	82	31
1979	(Switzerland) Marc Surer	Polifac BMW Junior Team; March–BMW	2	2	6	1	38	2
1980	(United Kingdom) Brian Henton	Toleman Group; Toleman–Hart	2	3	9	7	61	19
1981	(United Kingdom) Geoff Lees	Ralt Racing Ltd. Ralt–Honda	1	3	6	5	51	14
1982	(Italy) Corrado Fabi	March Racing Ltd. March–BMW	2	5	7	3	57	1
1983	(United Kingdom) Jonathan Palmer	Ralt Racing Ltd. Ralt–Honda	4	6	10	3	68	17
1984	(New Zealand) Mike Thackwell	Ralt Racing Ltd. Ralt–Honda	6	7	8	9	72	28
FIA Formula Two Championship
2009	(Spain) Andy Soucek	MotorSport Vision; Williams–Audi	2	7	11	3	115	51
2010	(United Kingdom) Dean Stoneman	MotorSport Vision; Williams–Audi	6	6	13	6	284	42
2011	(Italy) Mirko Bortolotti	MotorSport Vision; Williams–Audi	7	7	14	7	316	121
2012	(United Kingdom) Luciano Bacheta	MotorSport Vision; Williams–Audi	3	5	10	5	231.5	21.5
FIA Formula 2 Championship
2017	(Monaco) Charles Leclerc	Prema Racing; Dallara-Mecachrome	8	7	10	4	282	72
2018	(United Kingdom) George Russell	ART Grand Prix; Dallara-Mecachrome	5	7	11	6	287	68
2019	(Netherlands) Nyck de Vries	ART Grand Prix; Dallara-Mecachrome	5	4	12	3	266	52
2020	(Germany) Mick Schumacher	Prema Racing; Dallara-Mecachrome	0	2	10	2	215	14
2021	(Australia) Oscar Piastri	Prema Racing; Dallara-Mecachrome	5	6	11	6	252.5	60.5
2022	(Brazil) Felipe Drugovich	MP Motorsport; Dallara-Mecachrome	5	4	11	4	265	101
2023	(France) Théo Pourchaire	ART Grand Prix; Dallara-Mecachrome	2	1	10	4	203	11
2024	(Brazil) Gabriel Bortoleto	Invicta Racing; Dallara-Mecachrome	2	2	8	2	214.5	22.5
2025	(Italy) Leonardo Fornaroli	Invicta Racing; Dallara-Mecachrome	3	4	9	1	211	36

== See also ==
- European Formula Two Championship
- FIA Formula 2 Championship
- FIA Formula Two Championship (2009–2012)
- GP2 Series
