= BMW in motorsport =

Motorsport activities of BMW

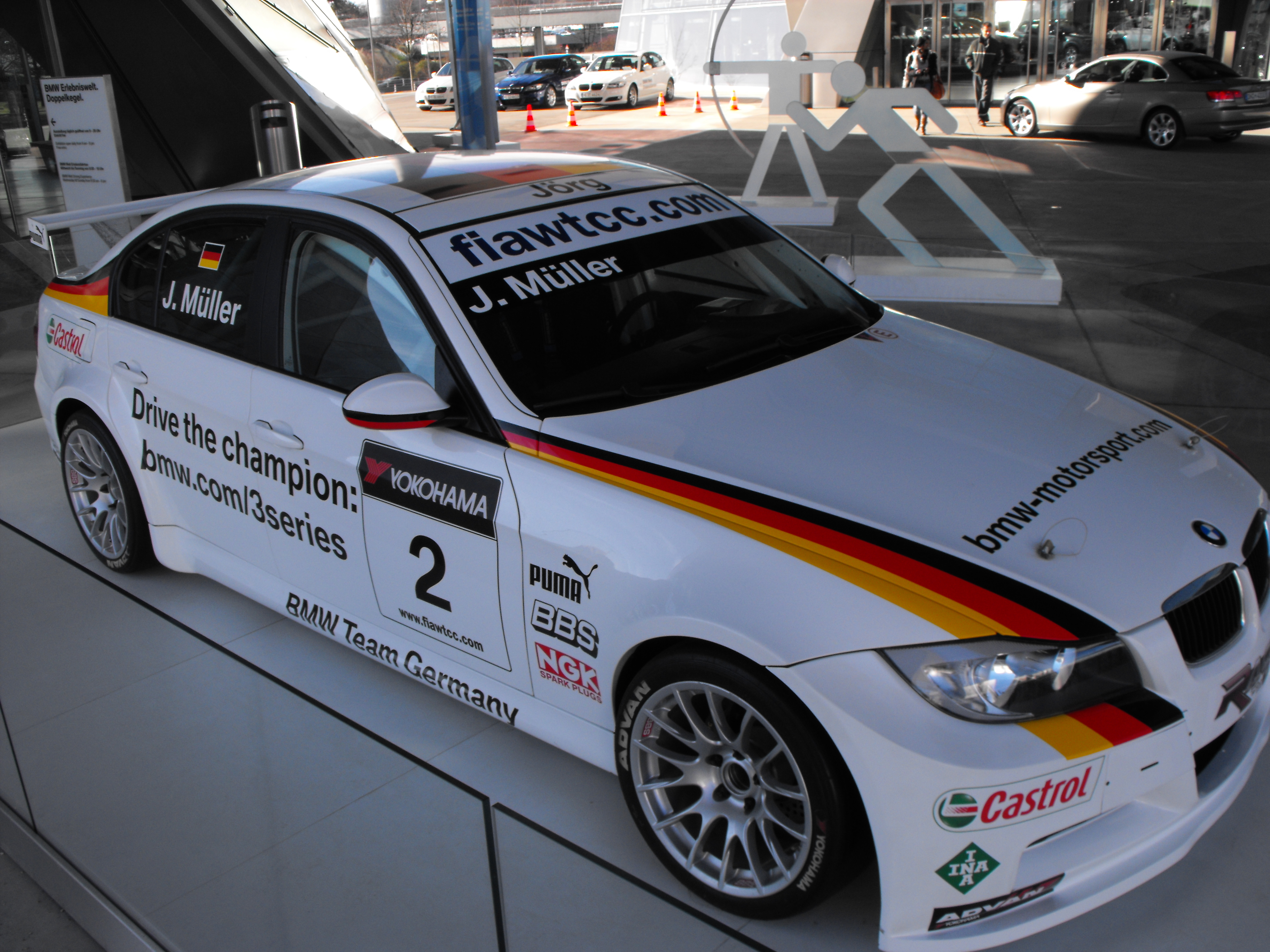
BMW 320si, E90 WTCC, Jörg Müller (BMW Team Germany) 2008

Throughout its history, BMW cars and motorcycles have been successful in a range of motorsport activities. Apart from the factory efforts, many privateer teams enter BMW road cars in touring car racing. BMW also entered cars or provided engines in Formula One, Formula Two and sportscar racing. BMW is currently active in IMSA, the Isle of Man TT, the North West 200, the Superbike World Championship and the Deutsche Tourenwagen Masters (German Touring Car Championship).

An outstanding role has been played by the 1,500 cc BMW M10 engine block. The four-cylinder started with modest 75 hp (56 kW) in 1961, became successful in touring cars, developed over 300 hp (224 kW) in 1970s Formula Two, and at the age of a quarter century, produced almost twentyfold its original power in the 1986 turbocharged BMW M12/13/1, producing an outstanding 1400 hp. This engine became widely regarded as one of the most powerful, if not the most, powerful engine in the history of Formula 1 as well as being the most powerful engine ever built by BMW. As the base of the BMW S14 engine of the original BMW M3, it collected many more wins.

Other impressive displays of engineering involve the production of the BMW S70/2 engine, implemented in the McLaren F1, which set the world record for "world's fastest production car" on March 31, 1998. As well as achieving a Guinness Book of World Records record for longest continuous Drift (See Below "Guinness Book of World Records")

== Motorcycling ==
=== Isle of Man TT ===
BMW enjoyed a dominant period in motorcycle racing prior to the Second World War with notable achievements such as Georg Meier's victory in the Senior Race at the 1939 Isle of Man TT. Post war BMW success mainly revolved around Sidecar racing, the marque becoming the premier machinery on the Snaefell Mountain Course, the smaller Clypse Course and from 1949 until the mid-1970s the Sidecar World Championship. BMW-powered sidecars have won numerous World Championships, notable competitors being Rolf Steinhausen, Klaus Enders and Max Deubel. The pre-war dominance enjoyed in motorcycle road racing faded post-war, the main road racing campaign centered on Production Bike Racing with Helmut Dähne campaigning the marque with BMW's best post-war finish until the second decade of the 21st century being a 3rd-placed position in the 1974 Production 1000cc TT.

BMW officially resumed road racing in 2009, entering the World Superbike Championship with its BMW S1000RR. This resumption also saw its official re-introduction at the Isle of Man TT. The 2014 Isle of Man TT saw Michael Dunlop campaigning BMW machinery in the Superbike, Superstock and Senior TTs. Dunlop took victory in the three main solo races, securing BMW's first win in the Senior TT since that of Georg Meier in 1939. Dunlop again took victory in the 2016 Superbike TT during the process of which he also set a new outright lap record for the Snaefell Mountain Course at 130.306 mph. Peter Hickman claimed the pole and victory at the 2018 Senior TT, setting record average speeds of 135.452 mph and 131.700 mph respectively.

BMW have won 25 Isle of Man TT Sidecar Races and an additional 8 victories in the solo classes. In total BMW have recorded 72 rostrum places at the Isle of Man TT, having notched up a total of 382 finishes.

=== Dakar Rally ===
BMW motorcycles have won the Dakar Rally six times with four additional podiums.

Year	Position	Rider	Motorcycle
1981	1st place, gold medalist(s)	(France) Hubert Auriol	BMW R80 G/S
1983	1st place, gold medalist(s)	(France) Hubert Auriol	BMW R80 G/S
1984	1st place, gold medalist(s)	(Belgium) Gaston Rahier	BMW R80 G/S
1984	2nd place, silver medalist(s)	(France) Hubert Auriol	BMW R80 G/S
1985	1st place, gold medalist(s)	(Belgium) Gaston Rahier	BMW R80 G/S
1987	3rd place, bronze medalist(s)	(Belgium) Gaston Rahier	BMW R80 G/S
1999	1st place, gold medalist(s)	(France) Richard Sainct	BMW F650 RR
2000	1st place, gold medalist(s)	(France) Richard Sainct	BMW F650 RR
2000	2nd place, silver medalist(s)	(Spain) Oscar Gallardo	BMW F650 RR
2000	3rd place, bronze medalist(s)	(United States) Jimmy Lewis	BMW R900 RR

=== Superbikes ===
- Superbike World Championship - 15 race wins since their reentry into the championship in 2009
- British Superbike Championship - 21 race wins since their reentry into the championship in 2010. Finishing second with Ryuichi Kiyonari at the 2014 British Superbike Championship.
- AMA Superbike Championship - 1976 champion with Reg Pridmore on a BMW R90S
- Australian Superbike Championship - 2 championships in 2011 and 2014
- Canadian Superbike Championship - 12 championships across Pro Superbike, Pro Rookie, AM Superbike classes
- FIM Endurance World Championship - 3 second places

== Touring cars ==
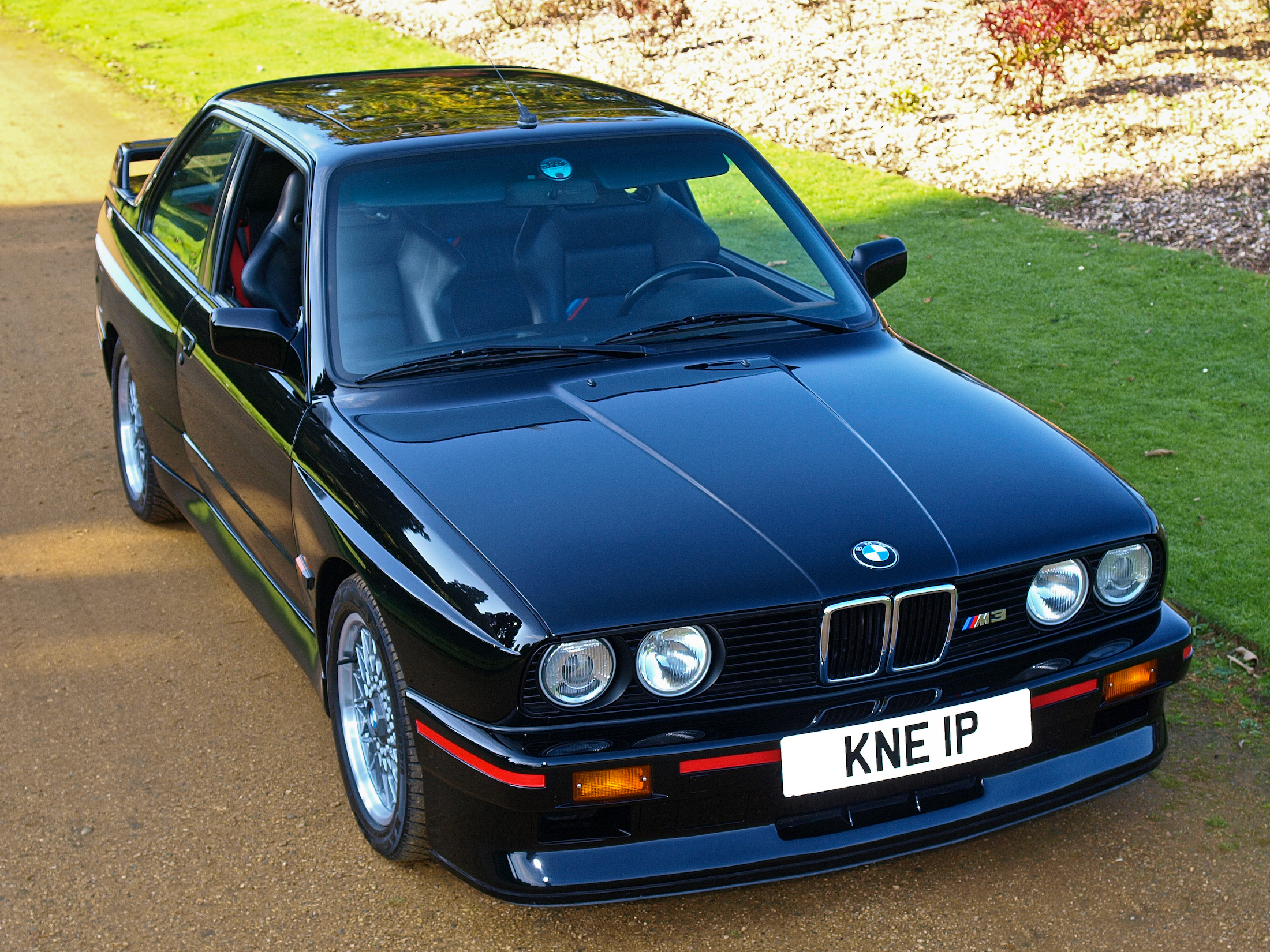
BMW E30 M3

In the 1930s, BMW drivers were successful with the BMW 328 two-litre sports car, winning many races including the prestigious Mille Miglia – a class win in 1938 and an outright win (with a streamlined body on a shortened course) in 1940 with Huschke von Hanstein. A Frazer Nash BMW 328 driven by A.F.P. Fane and came in fifth overall (first in its class) in the 1939 24 Hours of Le Mans. In fact, the BMW 328 proved unbeatable in international sports car races in the two-liter class.

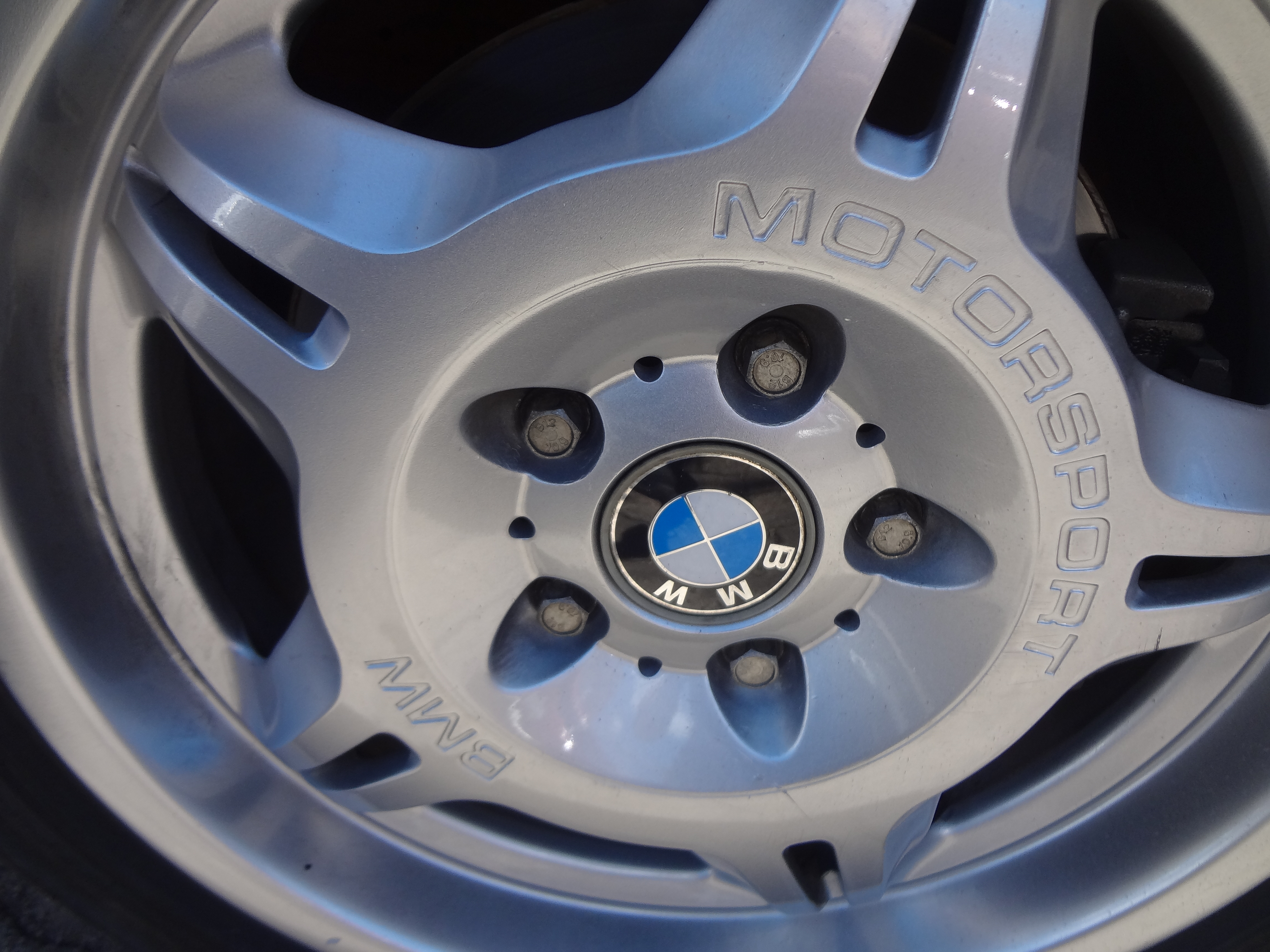
(BMW Motorsport)

Since the pre-war BMW 328 model, BMW had a reputation for sporty production cars. The expensive V8-powered BMW 503 and BMW 507 of the 1950s could not add much to this reputation, unlike the small motorcycle-engine powered BMW 700 which e.g. was driven by Hans Stuck to German championships in hillclimbing.

Since the 1962 introduction of the BMW New Class in 1961, BMW has become one of the most successful marques in touring car racing. The original 1500 cc 4-cylinder BMW M10 engine block was modified to a four-valve design which won championships in Formula 2. Equipped with a turbocharger, the version BMW M12/13 even won the 1983 Formula One championship.

In the 1970s, BMW M GmbH was formed to support the racing efforts. This led to the development of the BMW M1 and in the 1980s to the BMW M3. Having won more road races than any other BMW model in history, the E30 M3 is the world's most successful BMW road race car. Its success was emulated during the Supertouring era in the 1990s, when the 318i and 320i won several touring car national championships, including the BTCC, French Supertouring Championship, Super Tourenwagen Cup, Italian Superturismo and Australian Super Touring Championship.

British Touring Car Championship (BTCC): BMW won the drivers' championship in 1988, 1991, 1992, 1993, 2009, 2014, 2018, 2019 and 2024 and manufacturers' championship in 1991, 1993, 2016, 2017, 2018, 2019, 2020, 2021, 2022 and 2024.

The DRM (Deutsche Rennsport Meisterschaft) was won by Harald Ertl in a BMW 320i Turbo in 1978.

In the DTM (Deutsche Tourenwagen Meisterschaft), the following BMW drivers have won the DTM drivers' championship:

  - 1984: Volker Strycek, BMW 635CSi
  - 1987: Eric van der Poele, BMW M3
  - 1989: Roberto Ravaglia, BMW M3
  - 2012: Bruno Spengler, BMW M3 DTM
  - 2014 and 2016 Marco Wittmann, BMW M4 DTM
  - 2022 Sheldon van der Linde, BMW M4 GT3

BMW would also win the Manufacturers Championship in the Deutsche Tourenwagen Meisterschaft from 1984 until 1990 seven times in a row, still an unbroken record in that racing series.

European Touring Car Championship (ETCC): Since 1968, BMW won 24 drivers' championships along with several manufacturers' and teams' titles. BMW also won 5 drivers' championships with the BMW 320I at the European Super Touring Cup.

Japanese Touring Car Championship (JTCC): BMW (Schnitzer) flew from Europe to Japan to compete in the JTCC and won the championship in 1995.

SCCA Pro Racing World Challenge Touring Car Series(WC): BMW won the manufacturer's championship in 2001 and Bill Auberlen, driving a Turner Motorsport BMW 325i, won the 2003 and 2004 Driver's Championships.

BMW announced on 15 October 2010 that it will return to touring car racing during the 2012 season. Dr. Klaus Draeger, director of research and development of the BMW Group, who was in charge of the return to DTM racing (Deutsche Tourenwagen Masters), commented that "The return of BMW to the DTM is a fundamental part of the restructuring of our motorsport activities. With its increased commitment to production car racing, BMW is returning to its roots. The race track is the perfect place to demonstrate the impressive sporting characteristics of our vehicles against our core competitors in a high-powered environment. The DTM is the ideal stage on which to do this."

=== 1987, 2005–2010: World Touring Car Championship ===
In 1987 Roberto Ravaglia drove a Schnitzer E30 M3 to victory in the World Touring Car Championship, winning the title by a single point.

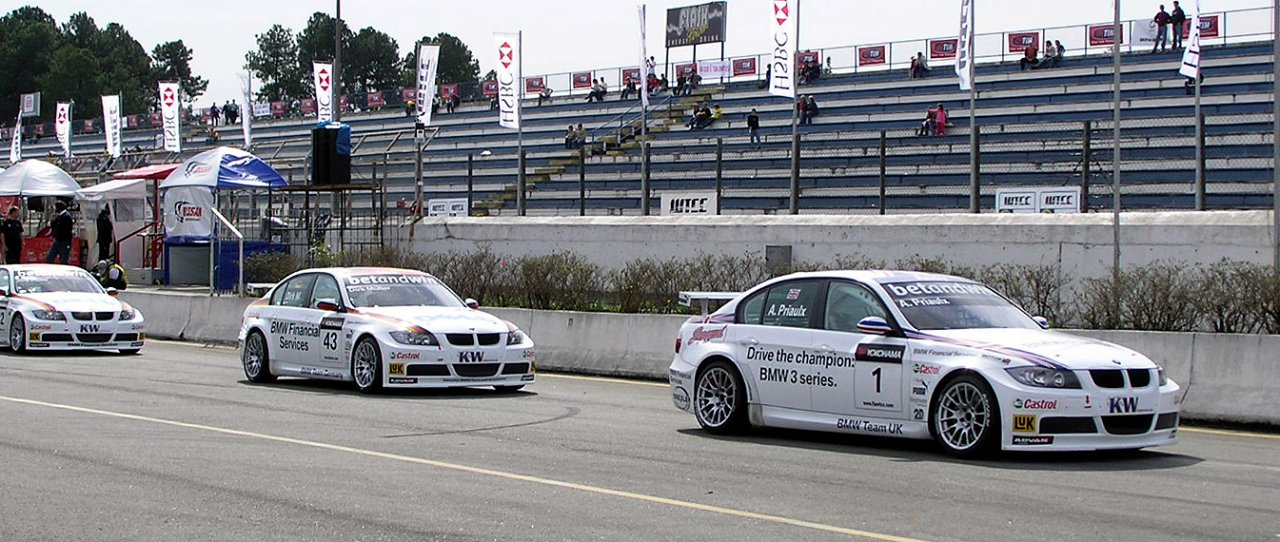
BMW 320si at the 2006 World Touring Car Championship.

2005 saw Andy Priaulx take the drivers title, and BMW take the manufacturers title, this time not with an M3, but the E46 320i. Priaulx's car raced under the banner of BMW Team UK and was run by RBM. Schnitzer Motorsport ran the BMW Team Germany entries, also E46 320i's, driven by Dirk Müller and Jörg Müller. Previous WTCC winner Roberto Ravaglia also ran two cars for the BMW Team Italy/Spain, with Alessandro Zanardi and Antonio García as the drivers. BMW also took the top four places in the independent category.

2006 saw the new E90 320si, again it saw BMW take the manufacturers trophy, and again BMW Team UK/RBM driver Andy Priaulx won the drivers championship. BMW Team Germany returned with both Dirk and Jörg Müller. BMW Team Italy/Spain retained Alessandro Zanardi, but now had Marcel Costa driving the second car, later to be substituted for Duncan Huisman. Priaulx again won the title in 2007, but BMW were beaten by SEAT in the following two seasons, despite adding Augusto Farfus to their roster.

In 2010 BMW reduced their presence in the WTCC, entering only two cars under the BMW Team RBM banner, with works drivers Andy Priaulx and Augusto Farfus. With Chevrolet dominating most of the races, BMW struggled and finished only third in the manufacturers standings. In the drivers standings Priaulx finished the season 4th, with Farfus in 7th. Better luck emerged in the Independents Trophy category though, with Sergio Hernández taking the championship behind the wheel of a BMW 320Si.

BMW withdrew from the WTCC at the end of the 2010 season leaving only independents to represent BMW in the championship.

== Formula Two ==
=== 1950–1984 ===
BMW pilots used the sporty pre-war BMW 328 model as the basis for early post-war efforts in the Formula Two series, a stepping stone to Formula One; the 328 occasionally participated in F1 races. BMW ran its own team, but other smaller teams such as Veritas, AFM, Jicey and even East Germany-based EMW also used cars derived from the 328 or its two-litre six-cylinder engine. However, after the death of the initial F2 series in 1955 and its resurrection the following year, BMW's management decided not to participate in expensive open wheel racing.

In 1967, the Formula 2 regulations were changed to allow 1600 cc motors, and BMW's new management was more open to the idea of open wheel racing. The BMW M10 block with a radial four-valve cylinder head designed by Ludwig Apfelbeck was used for some time. In the 1968 season, the company joined with Lola, using their 100 chassis. BMW sponsored drivers Jo Siffert and Hubert Hahne. For 1969, the team switched to Lola 102s, and used a new development of BMW's 1600 cc engine, dubbed the M12. Siffert and Hahne remained; Gerhard Mitter and Dieter Quester shared a third car. Halfway through the season, BMW debuted their own chassis, the 269, at the Hockenheimring. However, Mitter was killed in the 269 during practise for the 1969 German Grand Prix at the Nürburgring where F2 could race along F1 due to the length of that track. As technical failure was suspected, all BMW entries were retired.

For the 1970 F2 season, BMW debuted the 270 chassis, and campaigned with Jo Siffert, Hubert Hahne, Dieter Quester, and Jacky Ickx. However, in 1971, BMW's involvement was pulled back, with the team only supplying engines for Dieter Quester's Eifelland. With a change in the F2 engine regulations to 2000 cc production-based engines, BMW went on hiatus for the 1972 season.

When BMW's returned to F2 in 1973, the company again supplied only engines. Although officially backing the March team's effort for drivers Jean-Pierre Beltoise and Jean-Pierre Jarier, they also supplied engines for teams such as Beta Racing (with German Hans-Joachim Stuck) and Brian Lewis Racing. From 1973 to the end of Formula 2 in 1984, BMW supplied engines to the championship-winning drivers in 1973, 1974, 1975, 1978, 1979, and 1982.

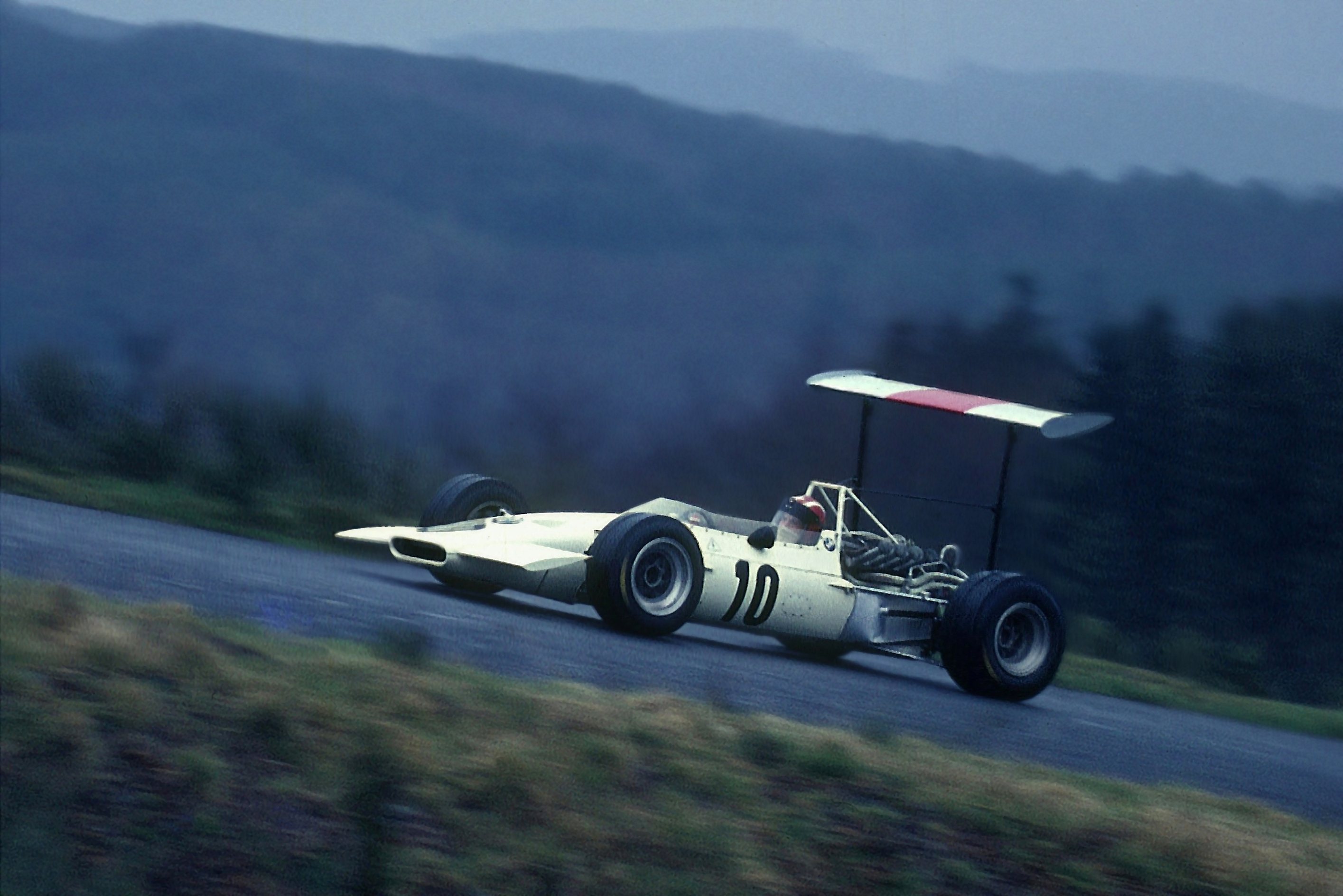
Jo Siffert in the Lola 102-BMW at the Nürburgring.

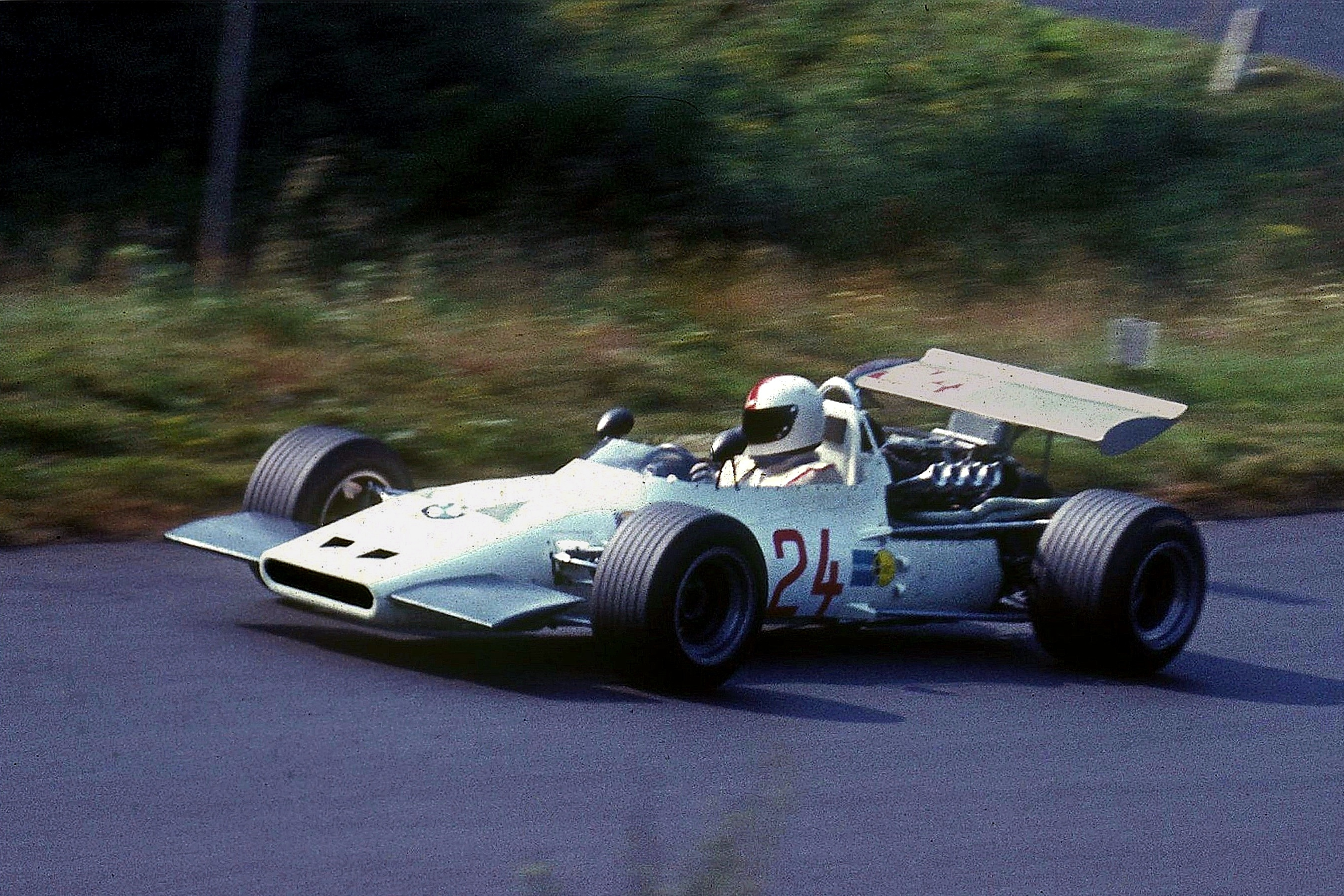
BMW 269 Formula 2.

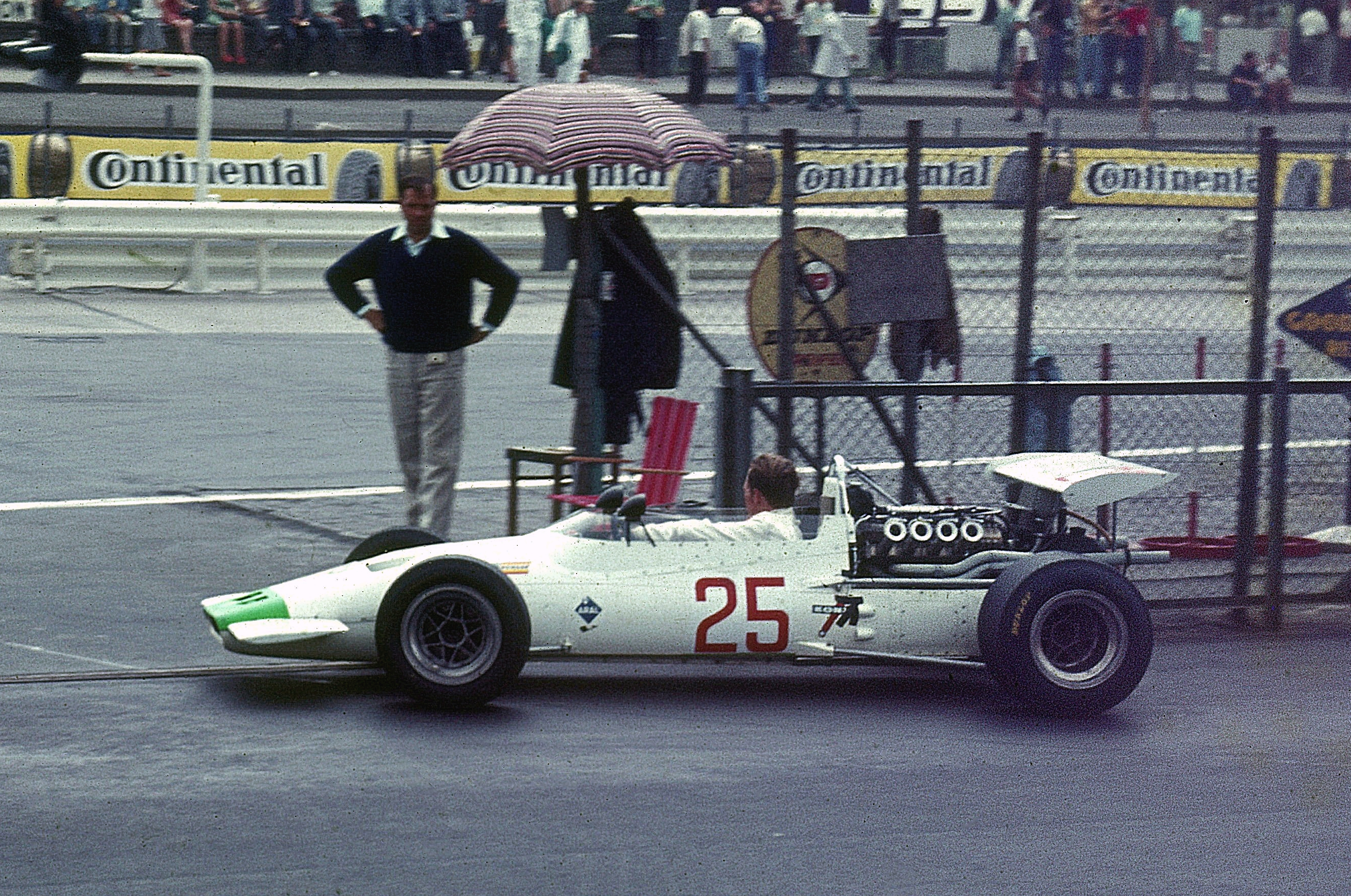
Dieter Quester in a BMW 269 F2 car.

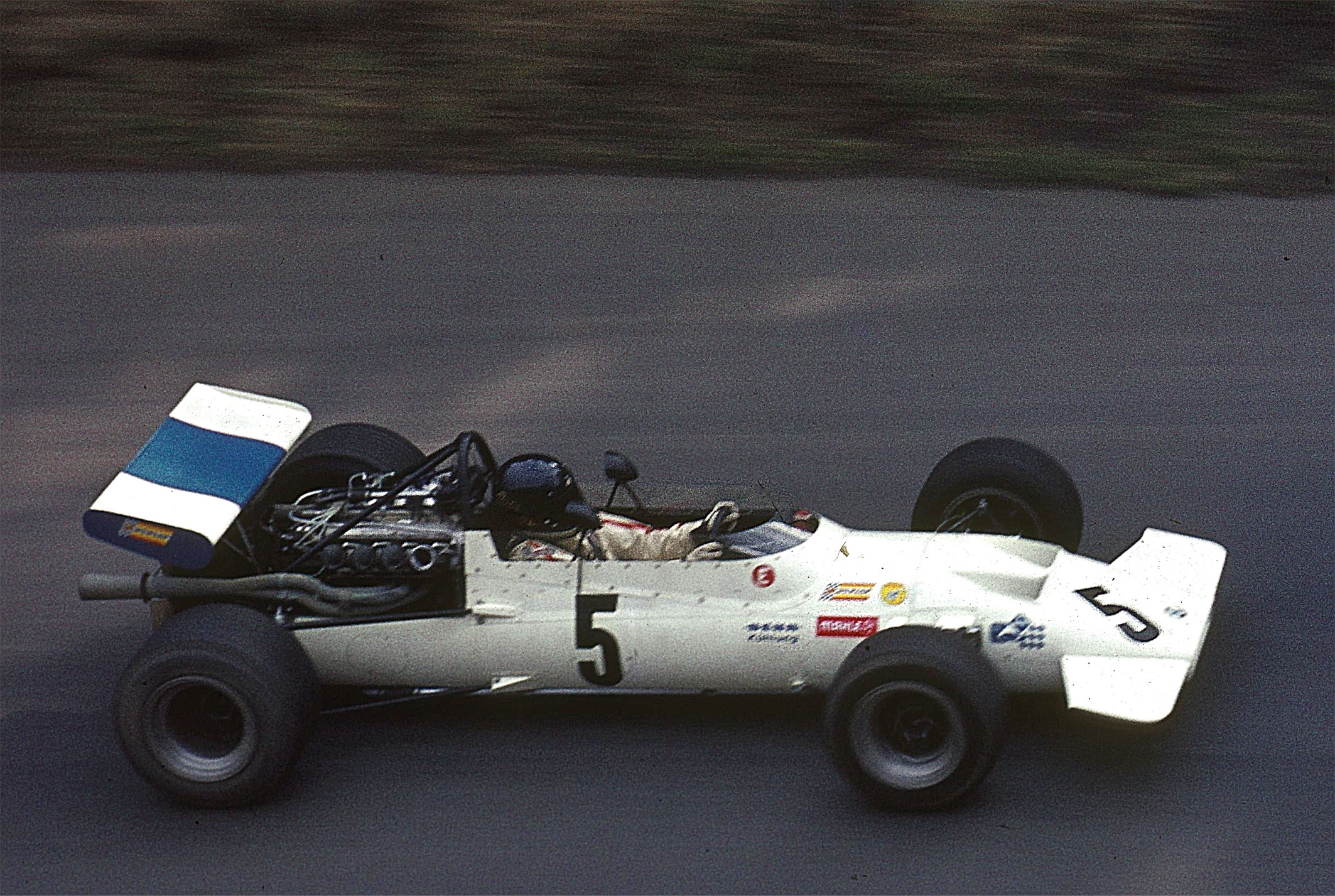
Dieter Quester racing a BMW 269 F2 car in 1970.

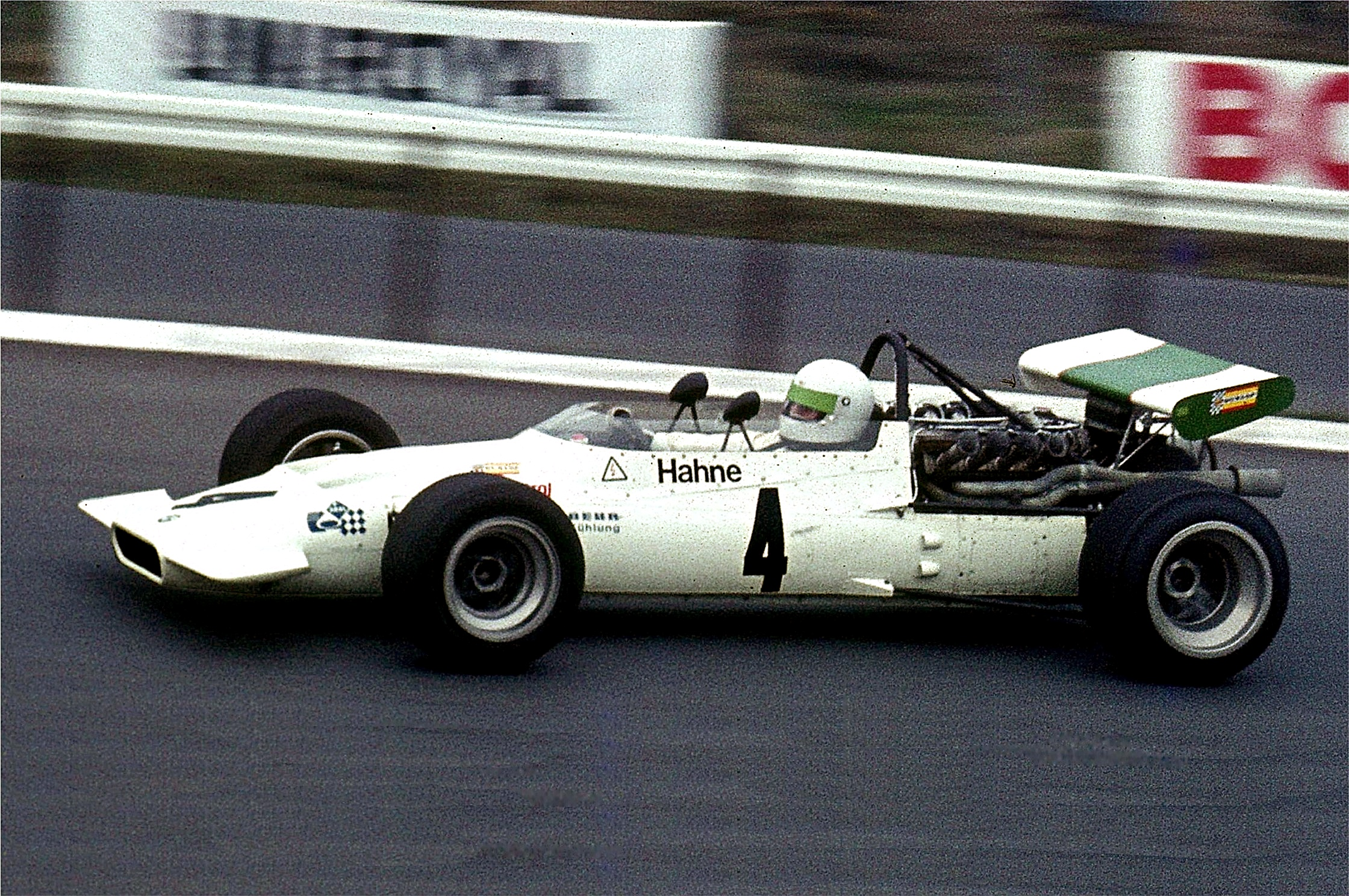
Hubert Hahne racing a BMW 269 F2 car in 1970.

== Formula One ==
BMW has a history of success in Formula One. BMW powered cars have won 20 races. In 2006 BMW took over the Sauber team and became Formula One constructors. In 2007 and 2008 the team enjoyed some success. The most recent win is a lone constructor team's victory by BMW Sauber F1 Team, on 8 June 2008, at the Canadian Grand Prix with Robert Kubica driving. Achievements include:

- Driver championship: 1 (1983)
- Constructor championship: 0 (Runner-up 2002, 2003, 2007)
- Fastest laps: 33
- Grand Prix wins: 20
- Podium finishes: 76
- Pole positions: 33

BMW was an engine supplier to Williams, Benetton, Brabham, and Arrows. Notable drivers who have started their Formula One careers with BMW include Jenson Button, Juan Pablo Montoya, Robert Kubica, and Sebastian Vettel.

=== 1980–1987 ===
In 1980, BMW announced their development of a turbocharged motor for the Brabham F1 team. The BMW M12 engine first raced in the 1982 season. The M12/13 engine won at the 1982 Canadian Grand Prix at the hands of Nelson Piquet; Riccardo Patrese was the team's other driver. The following season, BMW supplied engines to the ATS team; the factory-backed Brabham took four victories on its way to Piquet's championship win. Two more victories came in 1984, and BMW added Arrows to its list of teams who received its engines. In 1985, Piquet's Brabham, who was now teamed with Marc Surer, managed only one win.

In 1986, BMW started to supply engines for the new Benetton team, who earned the only win for a BMW engine at the hands of Gerhard Berger. However, the factory-backed effort at Brabham met with little success with the return of Patrese and Derek Warwick. At the end of the 1986 season, BMW announced it would drop out of Formula 1 at the end of the 1987 season.

BMW's M12/13 engine, however, continued to be used, because Megatron bought the rights to the engines for the Arrows team. The Ligier team was also supplied with the engine for the 1987 season. Following the 1988 season, turbocharged motors were banned, and Arrows ended its use of the former BMW engine.

The BMW M12/13 turbocharged straight-4 engine was famous during its life for being the first Formula 1 engine capable of 1,000 hp (746 kW) in racing trim, although it was capable of nearly 1,400 hp (1,044 kW) for qualifying with modification of its boost. This engine had a bore and stroke of 89.2 mm (3.5 in) x 60.0 mm (2.4 in), giving a displacement of 1,499.79 cc. Maximum crankshaft speed was 11,200 rpm. Peak power b.m.e.p. was in the region of 1,000 lbs/sq.in.

=== 1997–2005: Return to Formula One via Le Mans ===
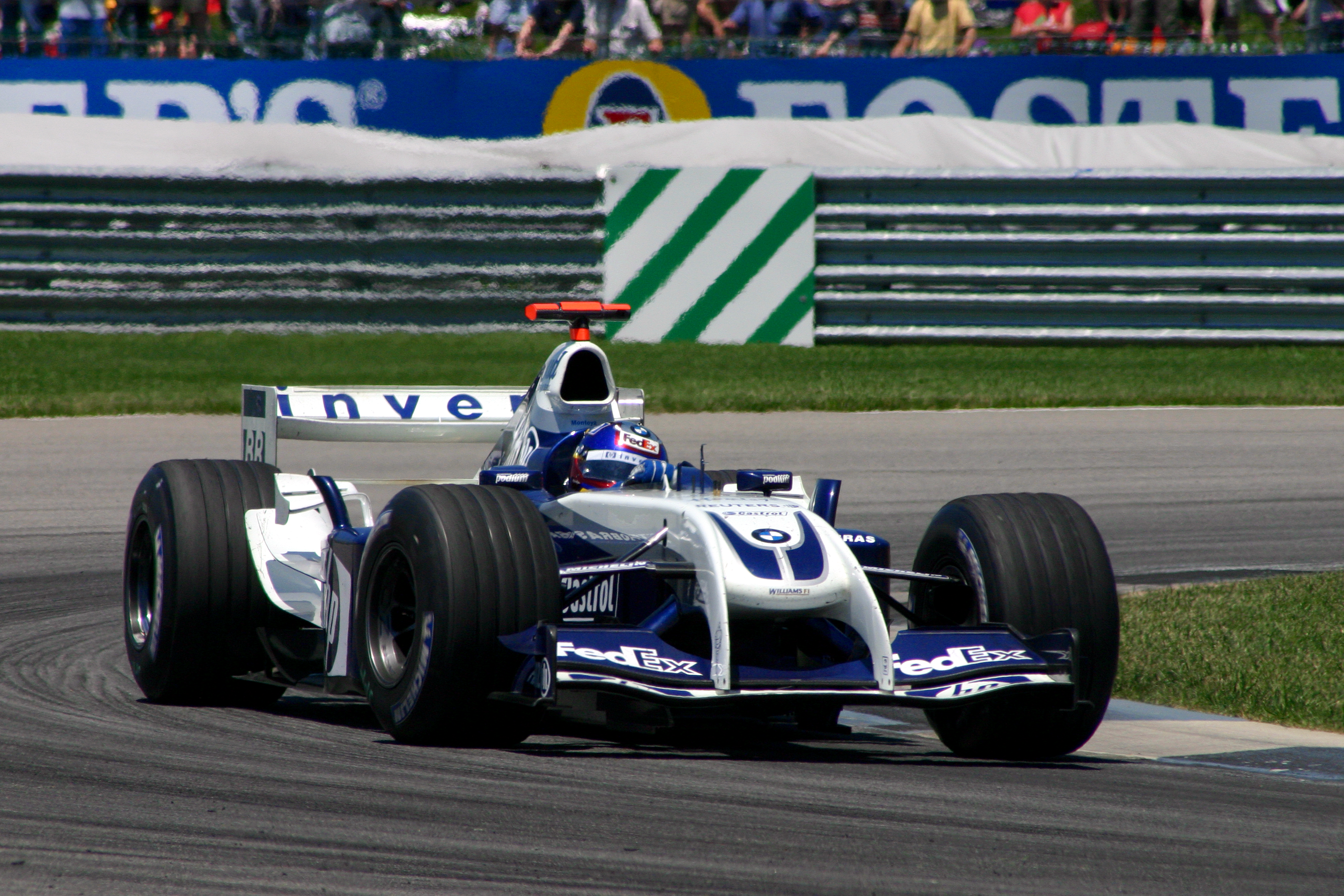
Williams-BMW 2004

In 1997, BMW announced that it had formed a partnership with Williams Grand Prix Engineering in order to provide V10 engines in 2000. The initial development of this partnership was BMW's sports car effort. Chassis built by Williams powered by a BMW M70 V12 engines were entered by long-time partner team Schnitzer Motorsport. The rather unsuccessful 1998 model was improved, and the efforts culminated in BMW's victory at the 1999 24 Hours of Le Mans with the BMW V12 LMR. Additional success came in the 2000 ALMS series before the cars were retired from racing.

Following the win, the second stage of BMW's partnership with Williams began, with BMW developing the powerful E41 V10 for Formula 1. The new Williams-BMW debuted in the 2000 season, driven by Ralf Schumacher and Jenson Button. In 2001, Schumacher took 3 wins and newcomer Juan Pablo Montoya took his first win. A lone win for Schumacher followed in 2002, but Williams-BMW returned to success in 2003, with two wins each for Schumacher and Montoya. Montoya was the lone winner in 2004.

In 2005, disputes led to a rapid decline in the partnership of BMW and Williams. Constant disagreements over the cause of technical failures in the car led BMW to discontinue development of the P84/5 V10 as the season progressed, leading to no victories for the team's new driver line-up of Mark Webber and Nick Heidfeld. Consequently, the car finished a distant 5th in the constructors' championship.

=== 2006–2009: BMW Sauber F1 ===
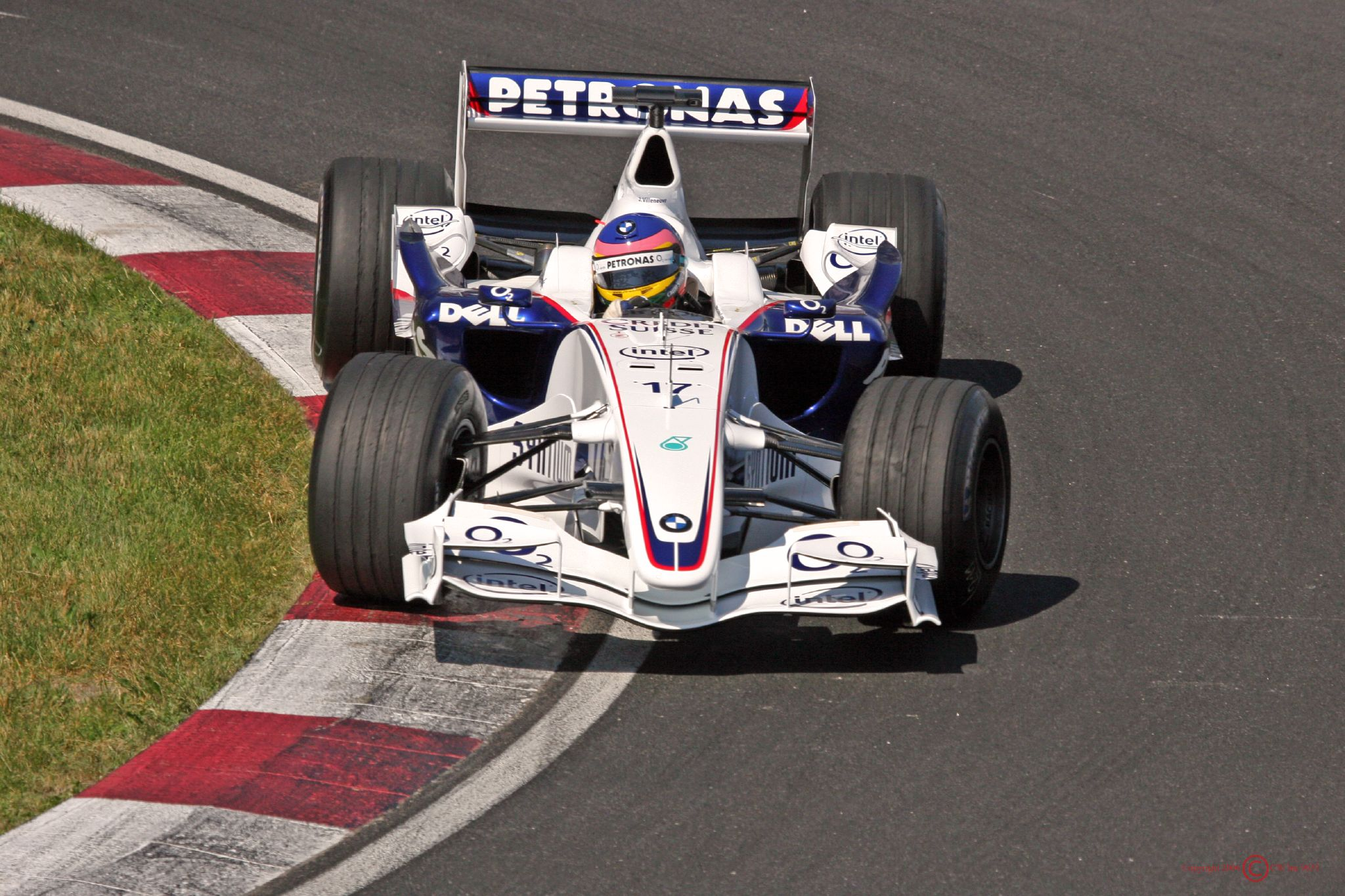
The BMW Sauber F1.06 of 2006

Wanting a split from their failing relationship with Williams, BMW's executives decided that adding an F1 team to the company's motorsport division, thus removing the necessity for a partner, was the only viable solution. Enticed by Sauber's new multimillion-dollar research and development facility, which included an advanced wind tunnel setup, BMW choose to offer a buyout to Peter Sauber rather than scramble to build the facilities themselves. Sauber took the offer, and the buyout went through; the team began racing under the BMW-Sauber F1 name in 2006. The team being split between the Sauber facility at Hinwil, Switzerland and BMW in Munich.

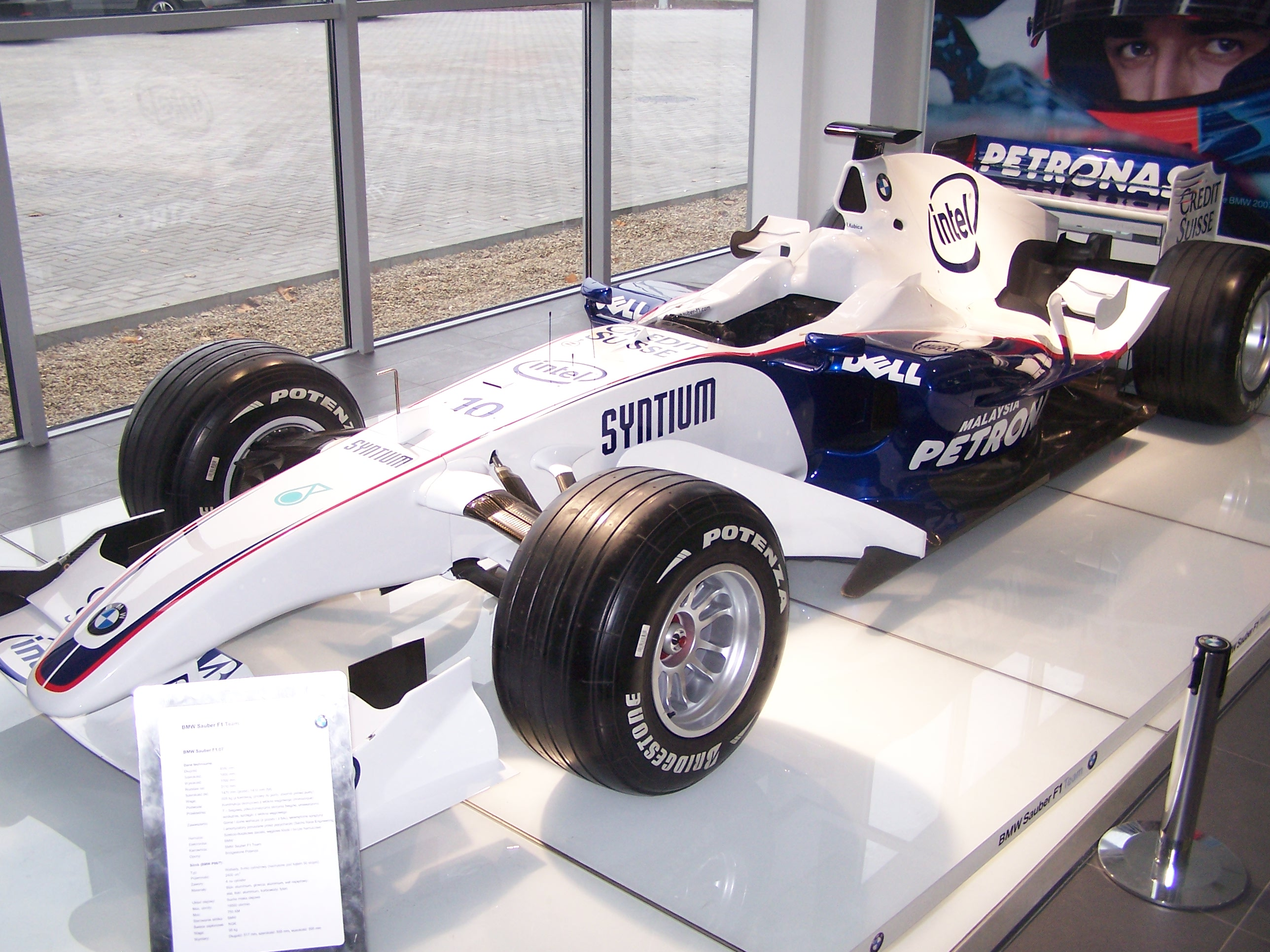
The BMW Sauber F1.07

The BMW Sauber F1.06 was relatively successful, earning the team fifth place in the constructors championship. BMW opted to retain BMW Williams driver Nick Heidfeld for 2006 alongside contracted Sauber driver Jacques Villeneuve. Villeneuve was later replaced by Polish driver Robert Kubica after disagreements between Villeneuve and the team.

BMW's 2007 season improved on results from the previous year. While the car was still inferior to both the Ferrari and McLaren, it outclassed the rest of the field. BMW scored points in every race, ending the season second in the constructors championship (after McLaren's disqualification) with over 100 points. In 2008 BMW won their first race at the Canadian Grand Prix. The team also achieved several podium finishes like Heidfeld's at the first race of the season in Australia and a second place for Kubica in Monte Carlo.

In July 2009, BMW announced that it would withdraw from Formula One at the end of the 2009 season. The team was sold back to the previous owner, Peter Sauber, who kept the BMW part of the name for the 2010 season due to issues with the Concorde Agreement. The team has since dropped BMW from their name starting in 2011.

== Formula E ==
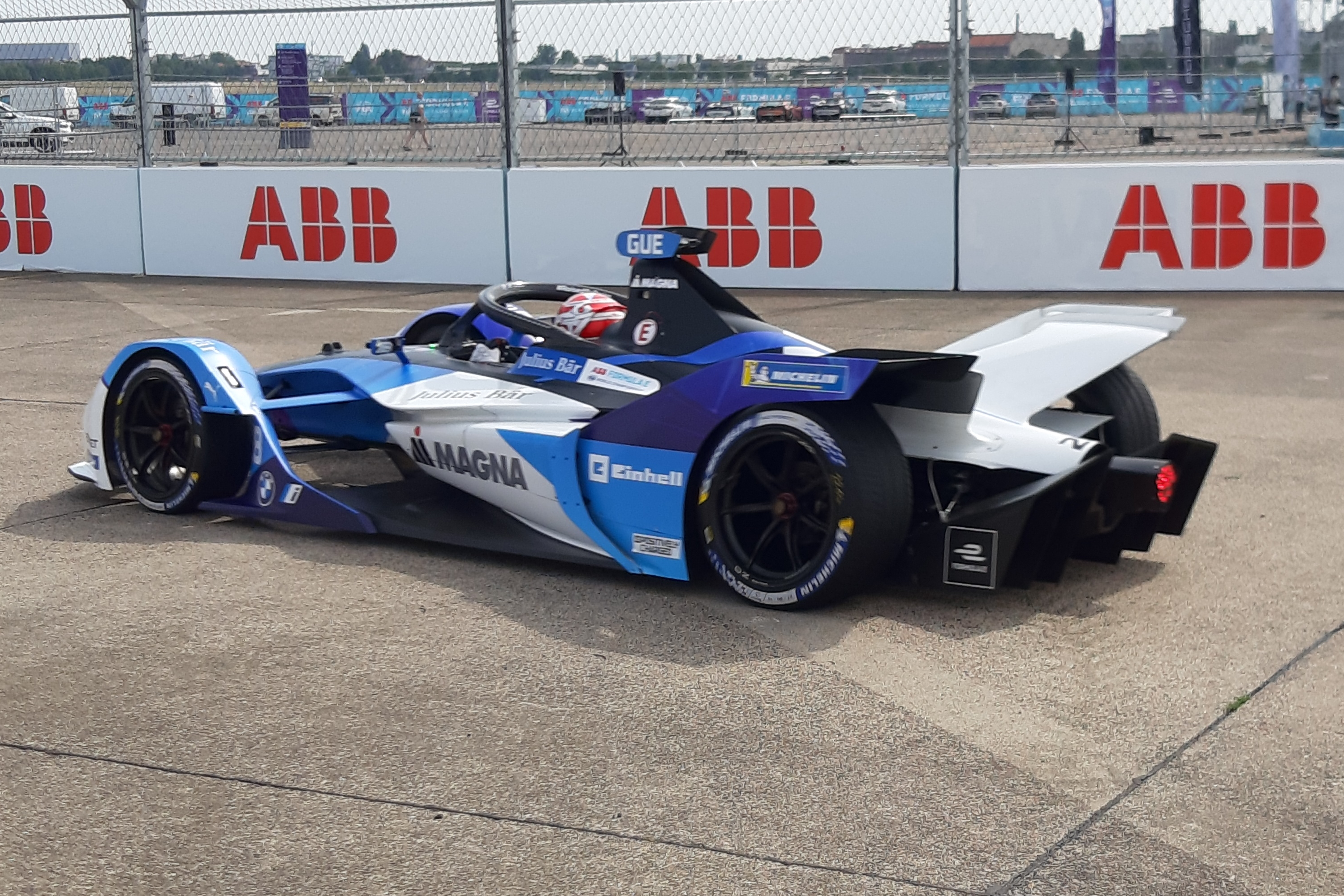
BMW iFE.21 race car driving by Maximilian Günther

BMW joined Formula E as an official manufacturer from season 5. The German performance car giant has built a brand new powertrain to be used by the Andretti team in the 2018/19 season. The team's drivers for the season were António Félix da Costa and Alexander Sims.

After securing 7 victories in Formula E, BMW left the sport as a team after the 2020–21 season. BMW continued to supply their powertrain to Andretti for another season before Formula E Gen3 emerged.

A BMW i8 was used as the safety car of Formula E for the first seven seasons.

== DTM (Deutsche Tourenwagen Masters) ==
=== 2012 ===
BMW returned to the DTM for the 2012 season with the M3 DTM, which is based (visually at least) on the contemporary BMW E92 M3 Coupe. Three teams lined up on the grid for BMW as follows:

Team	No.	Drivers
BMW Team RMG	1	(Germany) Martin Tomczyk
BMW Team RMG	2	(United States) Joey Hand
BMW Team Schnitzer	7	(Canada) Bruno Spengler
BMW Team Schnitzer	8	(Germany) Dirk Werner
BMW Team RBM	15	(United Kingdom) Andy Priaulx
BMW Team RBM	16	(Brazil) Augusto Farfus

Canadian driver Bruno Spengler recorded the first DTM win for BMW in 20 years at the second race of the 2012 season, held at the Lausitzring circuit in Germany. Spengler then went on to claim the 2012 drivers championship. BMW claimed the 2012 manufacturers championship with 346 points, 11 points ahead of Audi and 17 points ahead of Mercedes-Benz. BMW Team Schnitzer earned the 2012 teams championship title. All three of these titled were clinched by BMW at the last race of the season at Hockenheim.

=== 2013–2020 ===
BMW clinched its second consecutive manufacturers' championship in 2013 at the season finale at the Hockenheimring, after a close fight with Audi all season. Drivers' honors went to Audi driver Mike Rockenfeller; teams' to Audi Sport Team Phoenix. BMW claimed a spectacular 1-2-3 podium sweep at the Red Bull Ring in Salzburg, Austria with Bruno Spengler leading home Marco Wittmann and Timo Glock. BMW also locked out the first two rows in qualifying for the finale at Hockenheim. BMW secured 51 total DTM victories with the BMW M3, and switched to the new M4 DTM for the 2014 season onwards.

== Formula BMW ==
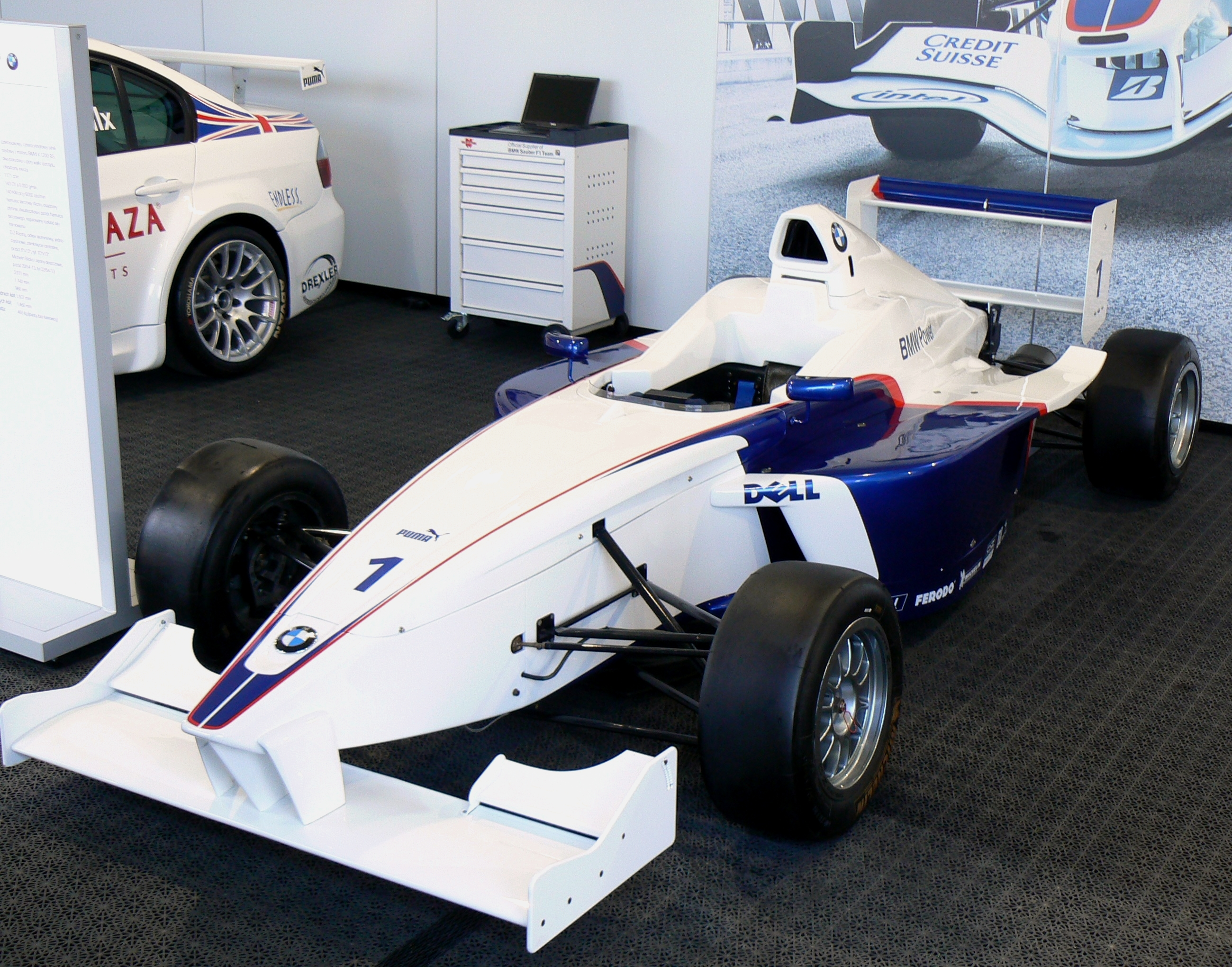
The Formula BMW FB02

In the 1990s, the Formula BMW was introduced as feeder series, with small cars powered by BMW K motorcycle engines. Former drivers were e.g. Ralf Schumacher and Nico Rosberg. Formula BMW has since expanded to encompass four championships across three continents. The German series was followed by a south-east Asian championship in 2003, and series in the United Kingdom and the United States were launched the following year. The UK and German championships will be merged into a new pan-European series in 2008.

== Le Mans ==
1939 saw the BMW 328 finish first in its class (fifth overall) in the 1939 24 Hours of Le Mans completing 236 laps.

After 33 years in 1972, a BMW entered the competition for the first time by Schnitzer Motorsport with the BMW 2800CS. In the following years, BMW became a common contender in the 24 Hours of Le Mans, represented by private teams racing BMW race cars in the competition from 1972 till 1989, and from 1993 till 2000 and by teams using BMW engines, most successful the McLaren F1 GTR who won the 24 Hours of Le Mans in 1995 with a BMW S70 6.1L V12 engine.

Also BMW Motorsport started with the BMW 3.0 CSL (1973), BMW 3.5 CSL (1976), BMW M1 (1980, 1981), McLaren F1 GTR (1996, 1997), BMW V12 LM (1998), BMW V12 LMR. The latter car, designed by Williams Grand Prix Engineering and entered by Schnitzer Motorsport, won the 1999 24 Hours of Le Mans overall against factory competition from Audi, Toyota, Mercedes-Benz, Nissan and others.

American Le Mans Series – BMW has won three (2001, 2010, 2011) GT Team Championships and GT Automobile Manufacturer titles. Twice (2010, 2011) with Team RLL in the Crowne Plaza V8 powered M3 GT coupe and once (2001) with the BMW Motorsport team in the V8 powered M3 GTR.

== Endurance racing ==
- Nürburgring – BMW won the 24 Hours Nürburgring 21 times (Record) and the 1000km Nürburgring three times (1976,1981 and 2025).
- A BMW works team E36 320d was the first diesel-powered overall winner ever at the 24 Hours Nürburgring.
- 24 Hours of Daytona – BMW has won five times (1976, 2011, 2013, 2019, 2020)
- 12 Hours of Sebring – BMW won this event twice in 1975 and in 1999.
- Spa 24 Hours – 25 times (Record)
- McLaren F1 GTR – Successful mid-1990s GT racing car with a BMW designed engine. It won the BPR Global GT Series in 1995 and 1996 and the 24 Hours of Le Mans in 1995.

== Rally Dakar / WRC ==
- RAC Rally – The 328 sport car won this event in 1939.
- Austrian Alpine Rally – The BMW 2002tii won by Achim Warmbold at the 1973 World Rally Championship. Being BMW's first maiden win at the World Rally Championship.
- Tour de Corse – The BMW M3 E30 won this event in 1987 during the 1987 World Rally Championship won by Jean-Jacques Lenne.
- Rally Dakar the Mini John Cooper Works Buggy won this event in 2020, and 2021 as well.
- The Mini All4 Racing won this event prior between 2015 all the way back to the 2012 Dakar Rally four times in a row, being the most successful powered BMW Engine works team.

=== Rally Dakar Championships for BMW ===
Year	Driver	Co-driver
2012	(France) Stéphane Peterhansel	(France) Jean-Paul Cottret
2013	(France) Stéphane Peterhansel	(France) Jean-Paul Cottret
2014	(Spain) Nani Roma	(France) Michel Périn
2015	(Qatar) Nasser Al-Attiyah	(France) Matthieu Baumel
2020	(Spain) Carlos Sainz Sr.	(Spain) Lucas Cruz
2021	(France) Stéphane Peterhansel	(France) Édouard Boulanger

=== WRC victories by BMW ===
#	Event	Season	Co-driver	Car
1	(Austria) Austrian Alpine Rally	1973	Achim Warmbold	BMW 2002Tii
2	31ème Tour de Corse - Rallye de France	1987	Jean-Jacques Lenne	BMW M3

=== Mitropa Rally Cup ===
BMW would compete with success at the Mitropa Rally Cup winning this competition 8th times also five times in a row between 1988 and 1992 the longest streak at this competition so far for the car company.

Year	Driver	Car
1965	(Austria) Romberg	Austin Cooper
1969	(West Germany) Günther Wallrabenstein	BMW 2002 ti
1976	(Austria) Franz Wittmann Sr.	BMW 2002 ti
1988	(Germany) Andreas Wetzelsperger	BMW E30 M3
1989	(Germany) Matthias Moosleitner	BMW E30 M3
1990	(Germany) Matthias Moosleitner	BMW E30 M3
1991	(Germany) Matthias Moosleitner	BMW E30 M3
1992	(Germany) Wolfgang Weber	BMW E30 M3

== Racing vehicles ==
Year	Car	Image	Category
1936	BMW 328		Sports Car
1962	BMW 700 RS		Sports Car
1966	BMW 1800TI & 1800 TISA		Group 2
1968	BMW 2002Ti		Group 2
1969	BMW 269		Formula Two
1970	BMW 270		Formula Two
1973	BMW 3.0 CSL		Group 2
1975	BMW 3.0 CSL		IMSA GTO
1976	BMW 3.5 CSL		Group 5
1980	BMW M1		Group 4
1981	BMW R80G/S		Dual-sport
1983	BMW 635 CSi		Group A
1983	BMW M1		Group B
1986	BMW GTP		IMSA GTP
1987	BMW M3 (E30)		Group A
1995	BMW E36		Super Touring
1996	BMW M3 E36		IMSA GTS
1998	BMW M3 E36		GT3
1998	BMW V12 LM		WSC
1998	Mygale FB02		Formula BMW
1999	BMW M3 GTR (E36)		LM GTE
1999	BMW V12 LMR		LMP900
2000	BMW M3 GT (E46)		LM GTE
2001	BMW M3 GTR (E46)		LM GTE
2006	BMW 320si		Super 2000
2006	BMW Sauber F1.06		Formula One
2006	BMW X3		Rally raid
2007	BMW Sauber F1.07		Formula One
2008	BMW Sauber F1.08		Formula One
2008	BMW Z4 M Coupé		GT300
2008	BMW Z4 M GT4		SRO GT4
2009	BMW M3 GT (E92)		LM GTE
2009	BMW S1000RR		Sport bike
2009	BMW Sauber F1.09		Formula One
2010	BMW Z4 GT3		Group GT3
2011	Mini All4 Racing		Rally raid
2011	Mini John Cooper Works WRC		WRC
2012	BMW M3 GT4 (E92)		SRO GT4
2013	BMW 125i M Sport		NGTC
2013	BMW Z4 GTE (E89)		LM GTE
2014	BMW M4 DTM		Class 1
2016	BMW M6 GT3		Group GT3
2016	BMW M6 GTLM (F13)		LM GTE
2016	Mini John Cooper Works Rally		Group T1.1
2017	BMW Ekris M4 GT4		SRO GT4
2017	BMW M4 GT4 (F82)		SRO GT4
2017	Mini John Cooper Works Buggy		Group T1.2
2018	BMW M8 GTE (F92)		LM GTE
2019	BMW 330i M Sport		NGTC
2019	BMW M4 DTM Turbo		Class 1
2022	BMW 330e M Sport		NGTC
2022	BMW M4 GT3		Group GT3
2023	BMW M4 GT4 (G82)		SRO GT4
2023	BMW M Hybrid V8		LMDh

== BMW Schnitzer Motorsports Team History ==
The team was founded in 1967 by the brothers Josef (August 7, 1939–August 31, 1978) and Herbert Schnitzer (b. June 5, 1941). Their stepfather Karl Lamm had a car repair shop and dealer business. The brothers started racing in 1962, and Josef Schnitzer won the 1966 German Championship in a BMW 2000ti. In 1968, both retired from active race driving to focus on the business and the race team.

In the 1970s, the Schnitzer's younger half-brothers Karl ("Charly") and Dieter Lamm joined the team, with Charly Lamm acting as team manager at the race tracks. In 1978, Josef Schnitzer died in an accident, and Herbert Schnitzer remained as the boss.

Apart from having the BMW dealership and Motorsport team based in Southern Germany's Bavaria, they also owned a BMW tuning specialist concern in the far north near the border of Belgium and the Netherlands, in Aachen. As this city has the license plate code AC, they called this branch AC Schnitzer.

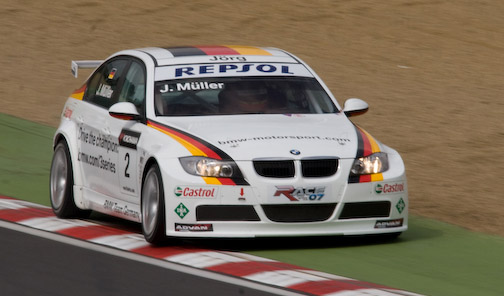
In the 2000s, Schnitzer Motorsport competed in the European Touring Car Championship (ETCC) and World Touring Car Championship (WTCC) as a BMW squad, BMW Team Germany.

Since the 1960s, the Schnitzer team was mainly active with BMW and BMW M cars in Touring car racing, namely in the European Touring Car Championship, the Deutsche Rennsport Meisterschaft, the Deutsche Tourenwagen Meisterschaft and the World Touring Car Championship (WTCC).

In 1977 and 1978 Schnitzer tried to take on the mighty Porsche 935 in the DRM. They developed a Group 5, 560 PS (412 kW) turbocharged silhouette version of the RA40 Toyota Celica and raced it with modest success. The best finish of the Celica LB Turbo was a fourth at Nürburgring in 1977, but with dismal reliability the next year Schnitzer withdrew and returned their focus to BMWs.

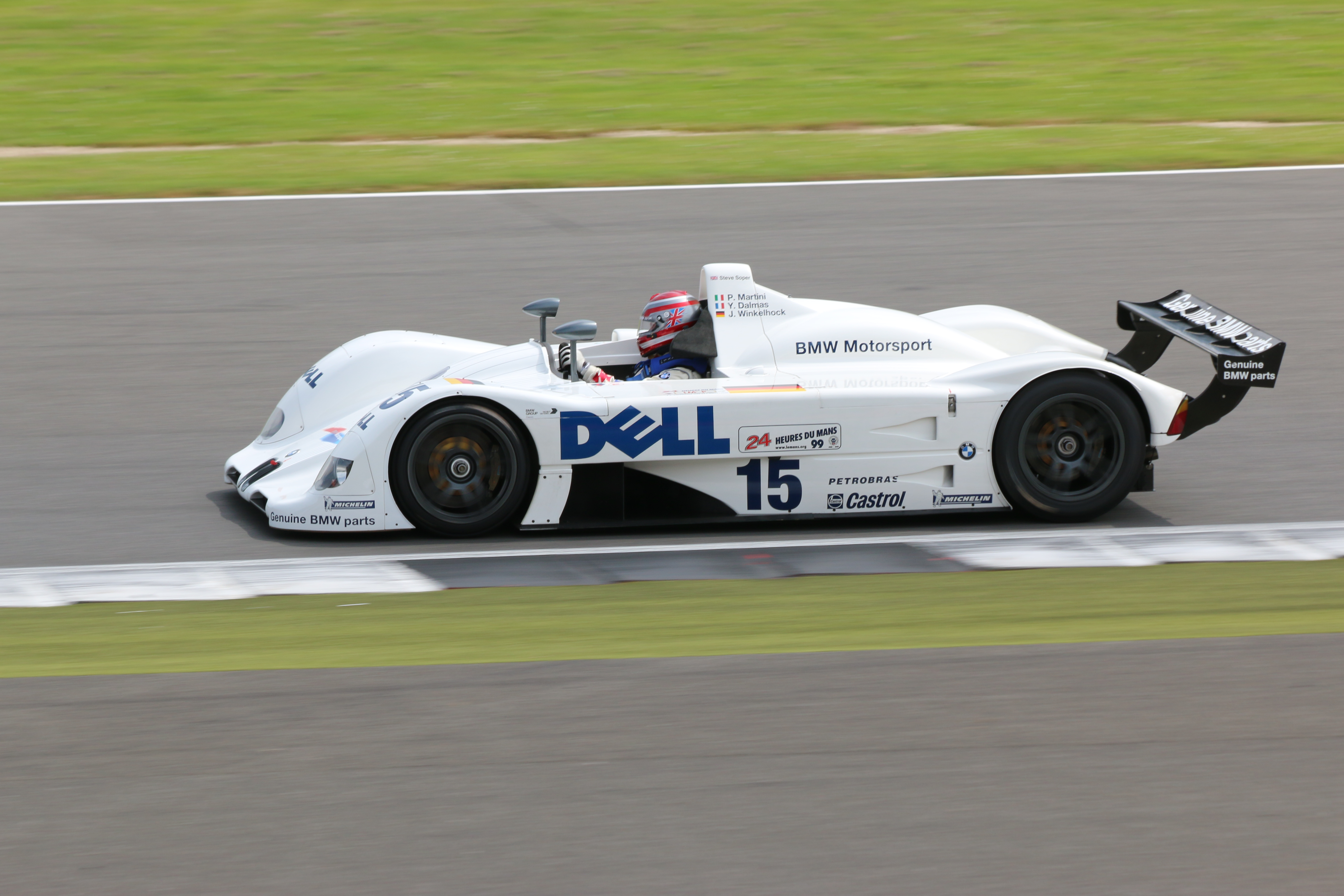
Schnitzer's BMW V12 LMR.

Joachim Winkelhock, Pierluigi Martini and Yannick Dalmas won the 1999 24 Hours of Le Mans for Team BMW Motorsport in a BMW V12 LMR, operated by Schnitzer Motorsport.

In the 2000s, they mainly competed as "BMW Team Germany" in the WTCC with drivers Jörg Müller, Dirk Müller, and Augusto Farfus from 2005 to 2009.

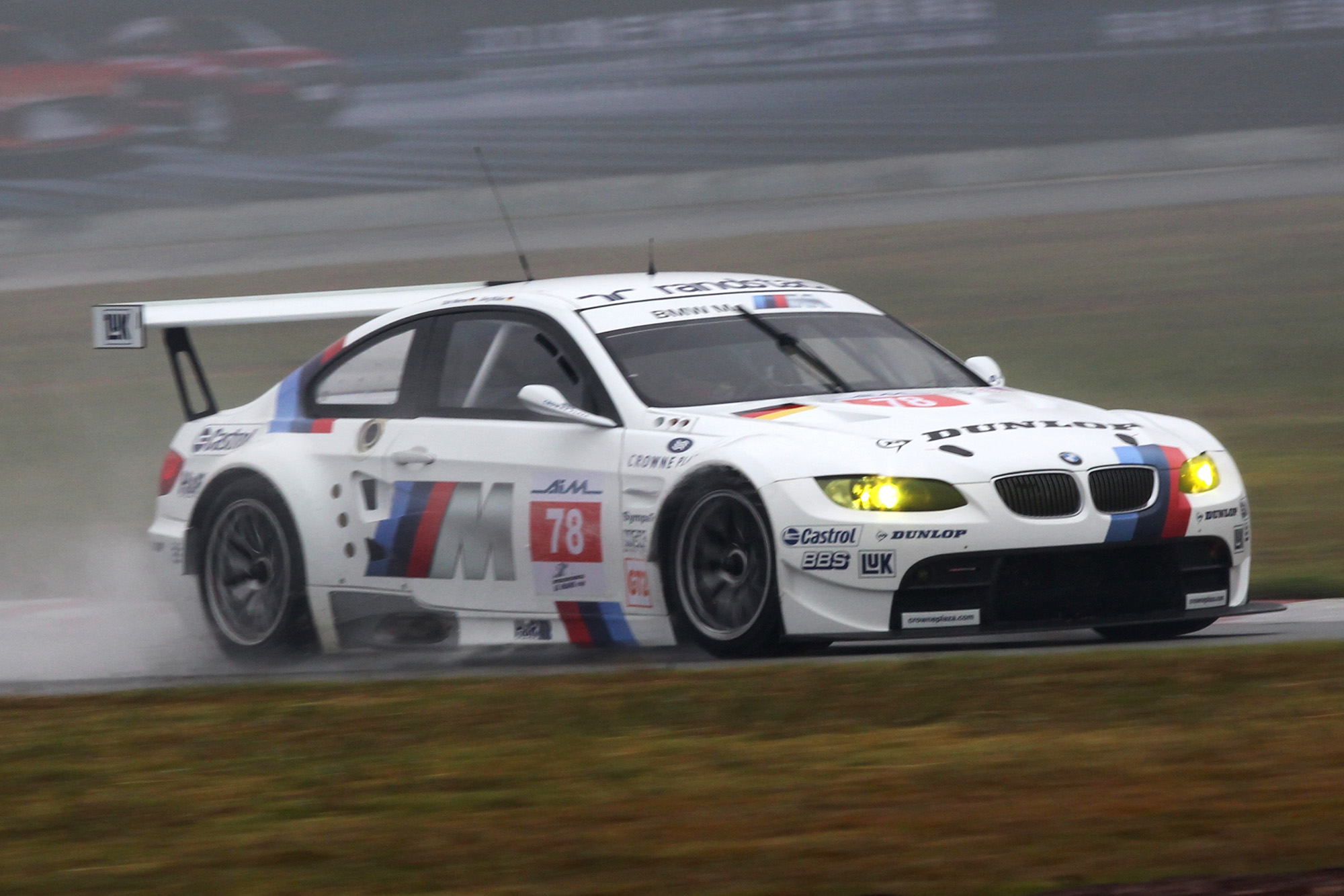
Schnitzer's BMW M3 GT2 at the 2010 1000 km of Zhuhai.

Schnitzer was also active in Sports car racing and Endurance racing, e.g. the ALMS and Le Mans Series. On 26 January 2011 it was announced that Schnitzer Motorsport, under the name Team Schnitzer, would run Andy Priaulx's GT2 M3 in the 2011 Intercontinental Le Mans Cup

In 2012, BMW Team Schnitzer, along with BMW Team RBM, and Reinhold Motorsport GmbH, each line up with two BMW M3 DTM cars in the DTM.

In September 2018, Charly Lamm announced that he would step down from his role at Schnitzer at the end of the year. He died unexpectedly on 24 January 2019.

In early 2021 the organisation began the process of being liquidated.

=== Achievements by the Schnitzer BMW Motorsports Team ===
Championships

- 1978 Deutsche Rennsport Meisterschaft (Harald Ertl, BMW 320i Turbo)
- 1983 European Touring Car Championship (Dieter Quester, BMW 635 CSi)
- 1986 European Touring Car Championship (Roberto Ravaglia, BMW 635 CSi)
- 1987 World Touring Car Championship (Roberto Ravaglia, BMW M3)
- 1988 European Touring Car Championship (Roberto Ravaglia, BMW M3)
- 1989 Deutsche Tourenwagen Meisterschaft (Roberto Ravaglia, BMW M3)
- 1989-1991 Italian Touring Car Championship (1989: Johnny Cecotto and 1990-1991: Roberto Ravaglia, BMW M3, BMW M3 Evolution)
- 1991 Nissan Mobil 500 Series (Emanuele Pirro, Joachim Winkelhock, BMW M3 Evolution)
- 1993 British Touring Car Championship (Champion: Joachim Winkelhock and Runner-up: Steve Soper, BMW 318i)
- 1994 Asia-Pacific Touring Car Championship (Joachim Winkelhock, BMW 318i)
- 1995 Japanese Touring Car Championship (Steve Soper, BMW 318is) and 1995 Super Tourenwagen Cup (Joachim Winkelhock)
- 1998 Super Tourenwagen Cup (Johnny Cecotto), BMW 320i
- 2001 American Le Mans Series GT (Jörg Müller, BMW M3 GTR V8)
- 2012 Deutsche Tourenwagen Masters (Bruno Spengler) (BMW M3 DTM)

Races

- 1976 1000km Nürburgring (Albrecht Krebs, Dieter Quester, BMW 3.5 CSL)
- 1985-1986 Spa 24 Hours (Roberto Ravaglia, Gerhard Berger, Marc Surer, Dieter Quester, Altfrid Heger, Thierry Tassin) (BMW 635 CSi)
- 1988 Spa 24 Hours (Roberto Ravaglia, Altfrid Heger, Dieter Quester) (BMW M3)
- 1988-1991 Wellington 500 (Roberto Ravaglia, Emanuele Pirro, Johnny Cecotto, Joachim Winkelhock, BMW M3, BMW M3 Evolution)
- 1990 Spa 24 Hours (Johnny Cecotto, Fabien Giroix, Markus Oestreich, BMW M3 Evolution)
- 1991 24 Hours Nürburgring (BMW M3 Evolution)
- 1992 Guia Race (1–2–3 finish, Winner: Emanuele Pirro, Runner-up: Joachim Winkelhock and Third: Roberto Ravaglia, BMW M3 Evolution)
- 1992 Pukekohe 500 (Emanuele Pirro, Joachim Winkelhock, BMW M3 Evolution)
- 1994 Guia Race (1–2 finish, Winner: Joachim Winkelhock, Runner-up: Steve Soper, BMW 318i)
- 1998 24 Hours Nürburgring (BMW 320d)
- 1999 24 Hours of Le Mans (BMW V12 LMR)
- 2004-2005 24 Hours Nürburgring (1–2 finishes two years in a row, BMW M3 GTR V8)
- 2010 24 Hours Nürburgring (Jörg Müller, Augusto Farfus, Uwe Alzen, Pedro Lamy, BMW M3 GT2)
- 2018 FIA GT World Cup (Augusto Farfus, BMW M6 GT3)

== Guinness Book of World Records ==
On May 11, 2013, BMW placed itself in the Guinness Book of World Records for longest drift after deciding that they wanted the record "back in the US". Johan Shwartz achieved a 51.3 mile continuous drift on a skidpad in the BMW F10 M5, ultimately breaking Abdo Feghali's world record of 11,180 metres (approximately 6.95 miles) that was achieved in a Chevrolet Camaro, in Abu Dhabi.

== Other events ==
BMW had various touring and sportscar successes throughout the rest of the 1980s and 1990s following its exit from Formula One. In 1986, BMW North America also ran the BMW GTP in the IMSA GT Championship, with little success.

Since 1987, The Kumho BMW Championship has also existed, which is a BMW-exclusive motorsport championship. It is operated and run in the UK, with some races occasionally taking part in the Europe mainland. 2005 saw the BMW Challenge join as a class within the Kumho BMW Championship only to leave a year later to become a standalone UK Championship called The BMW Production Championship. In 2008, a split between the committee and the organising club (CTCRC) saw it lose its championship status and a breakaway PBMW Cup was formed.

Automatic Racing had entered a BMW M6 into the 2008 Rolex Sports Car Series season, driven by an all American team consisting of Jep Thorton, Tom Long, Joe Varde and David Russell. Turner Motorsport entered a BMW M6 for the 2010 season, followed by two BMW M3s from 2011 to 2013. They have racked up six Rolex GT wins and 24 top ten finishes in the GT class, including rare double class wins for the GT M3 and GS M3 at the Circuit of the Americas round in 2013.

== Pictures ==
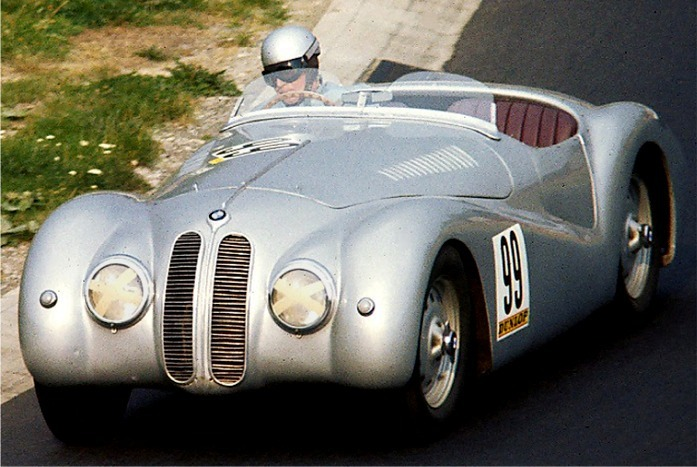
The BMW 328, winner of Mille Miglia in 1938.

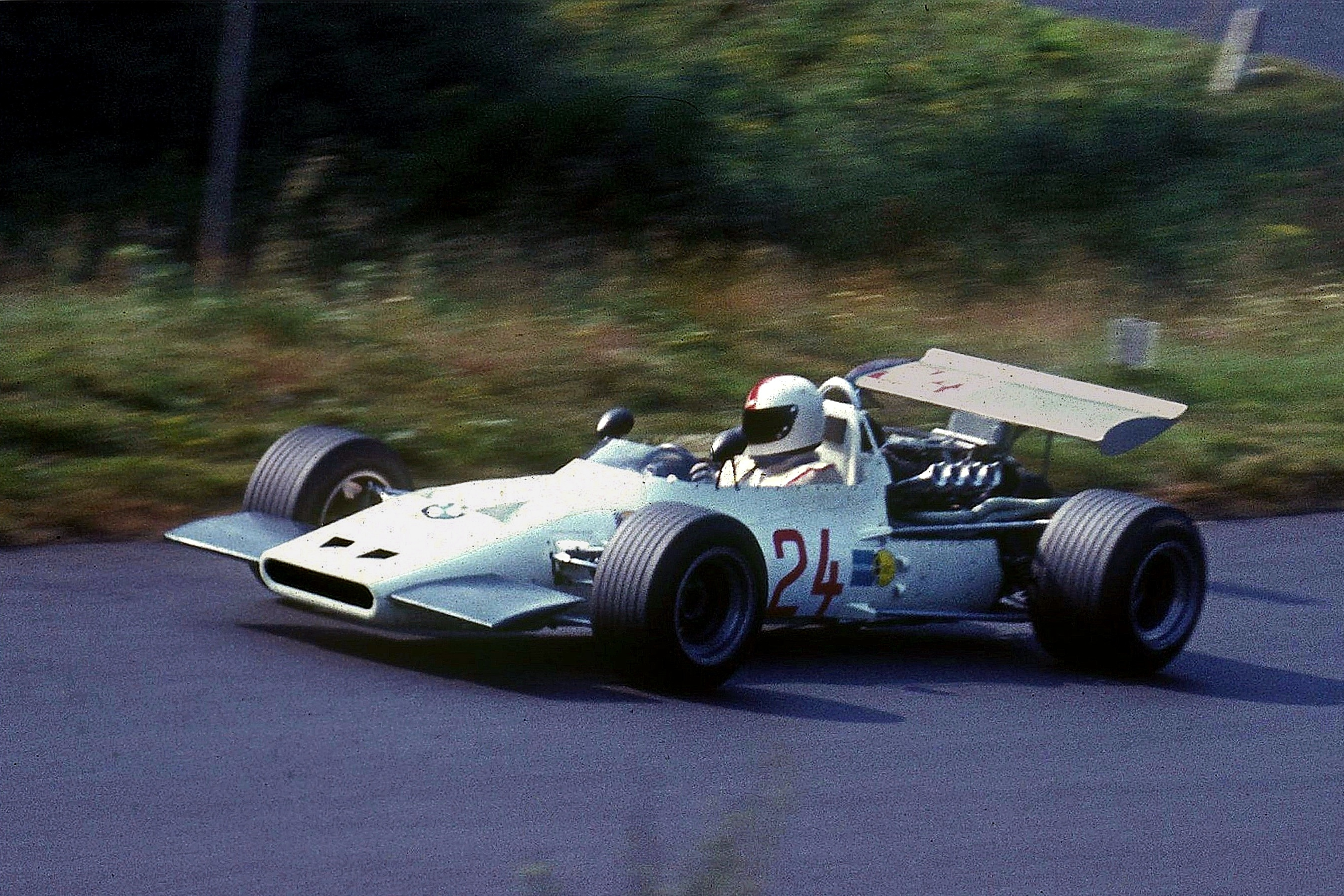
Gerhard Mitter in a BMW F2 ('69)

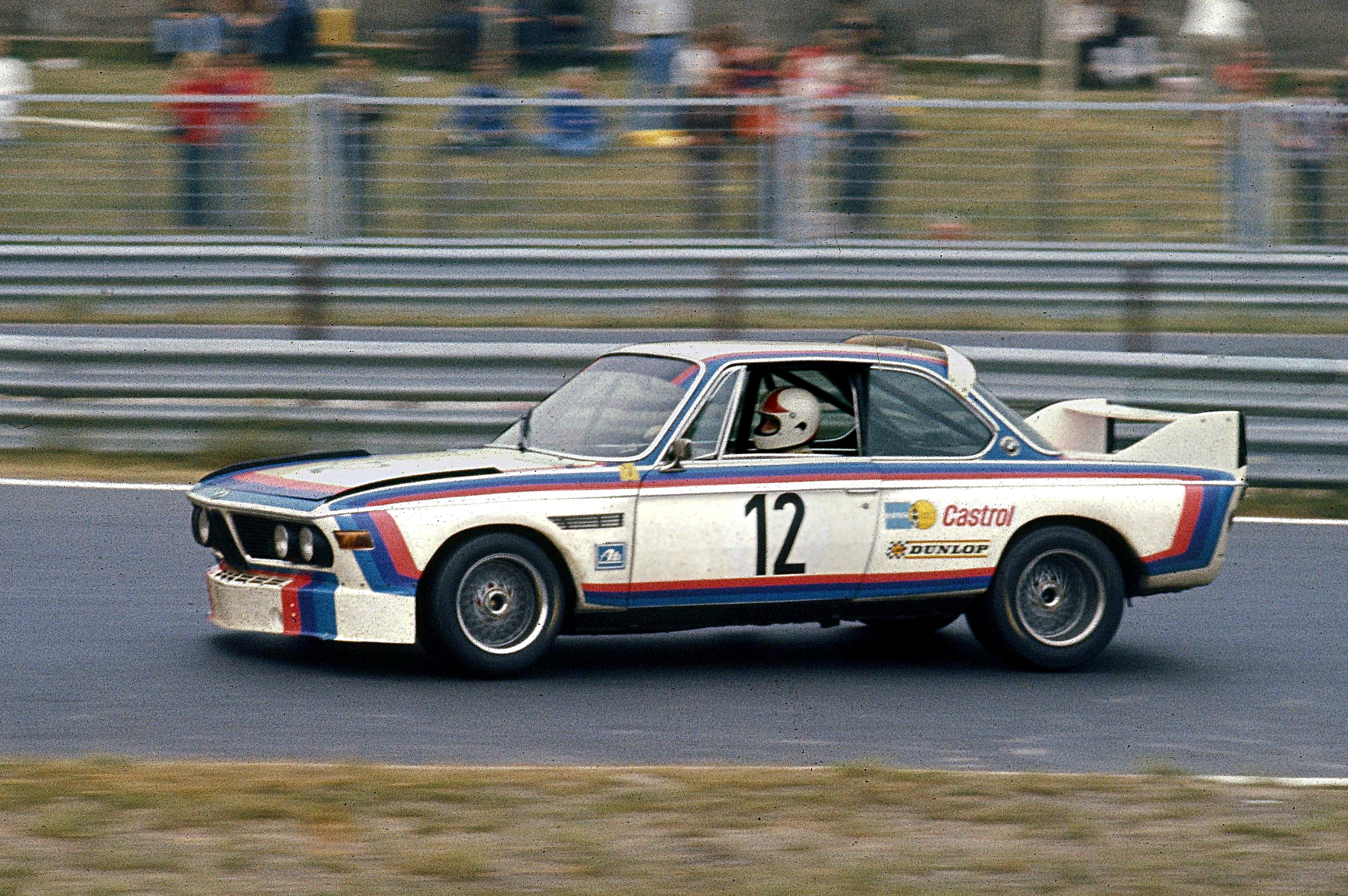
Chris Amon in a BMW 3.0 CSL ('73)

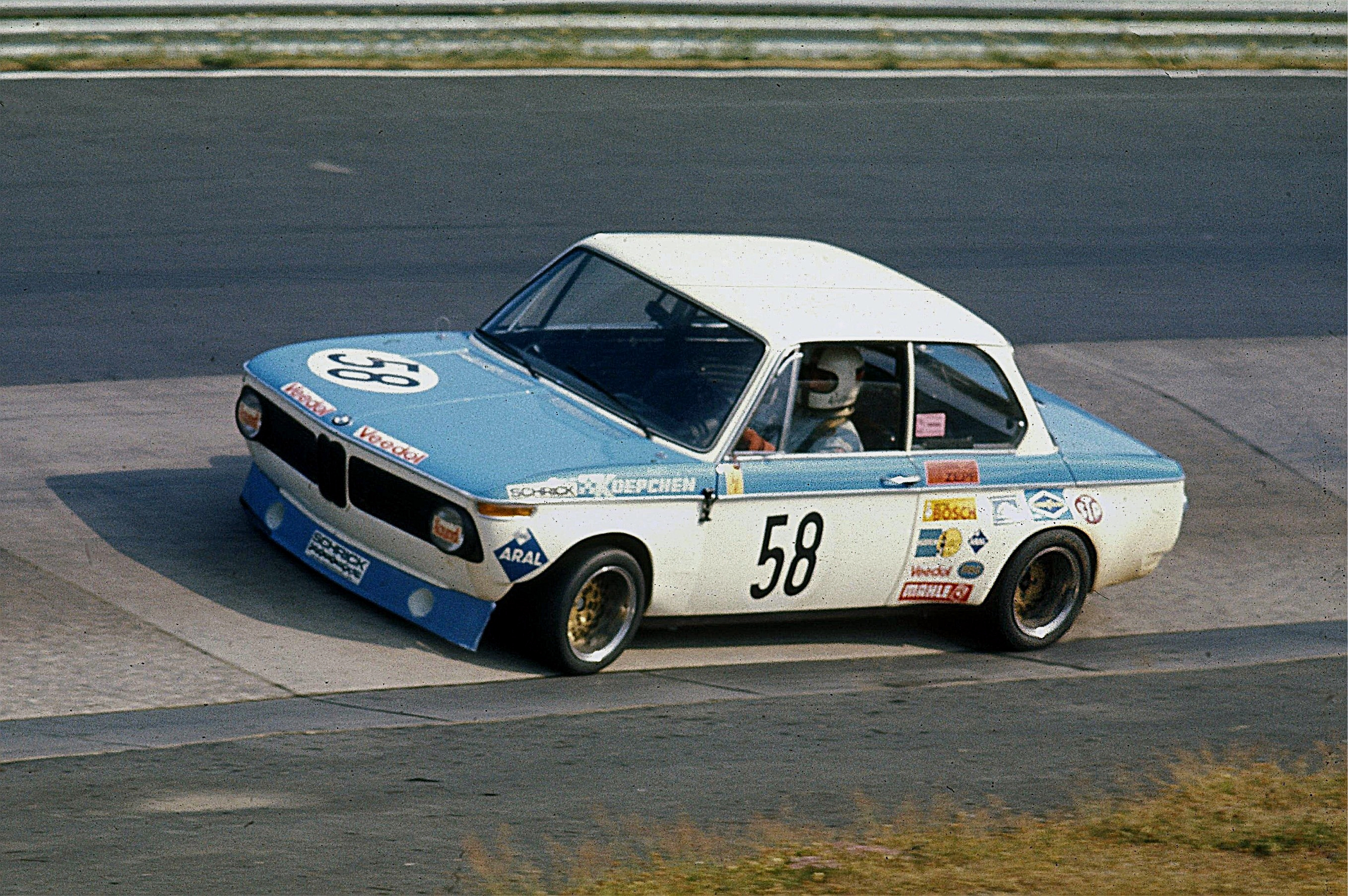
Helmut Kelleners in a BMW 2002

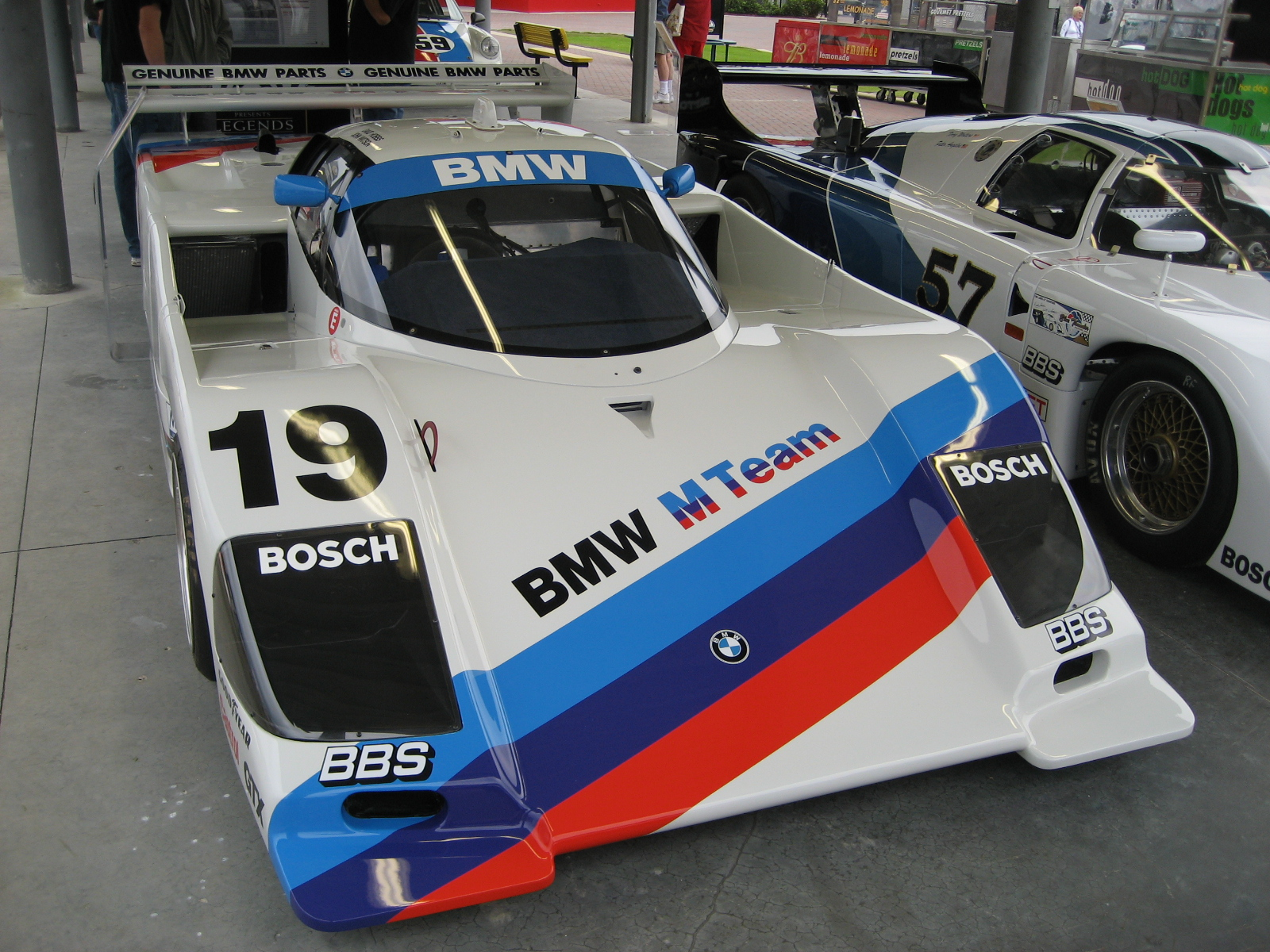
An IMSA GTP BMW GTP ('86)

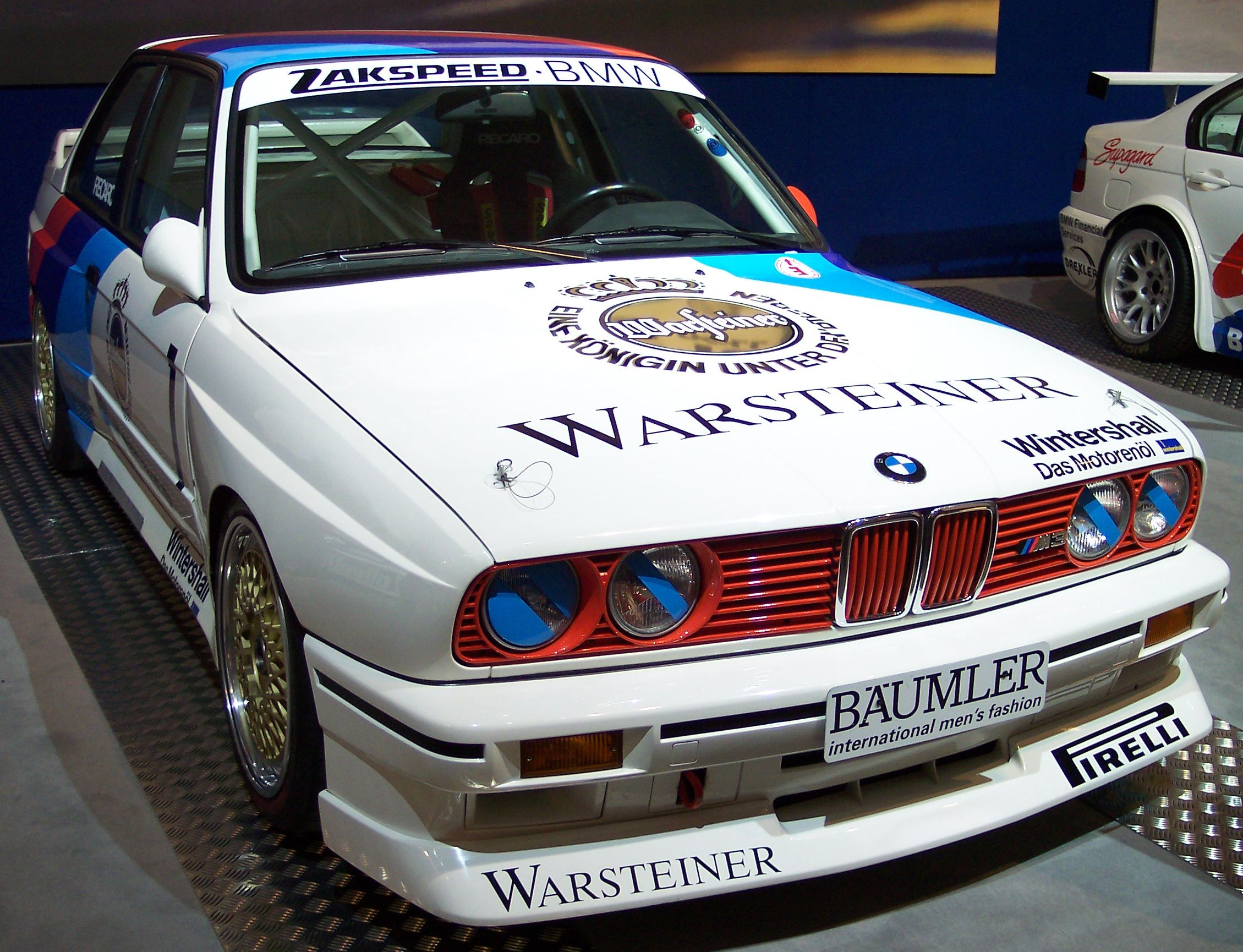
A BMW M3 Group A DTM ('87)

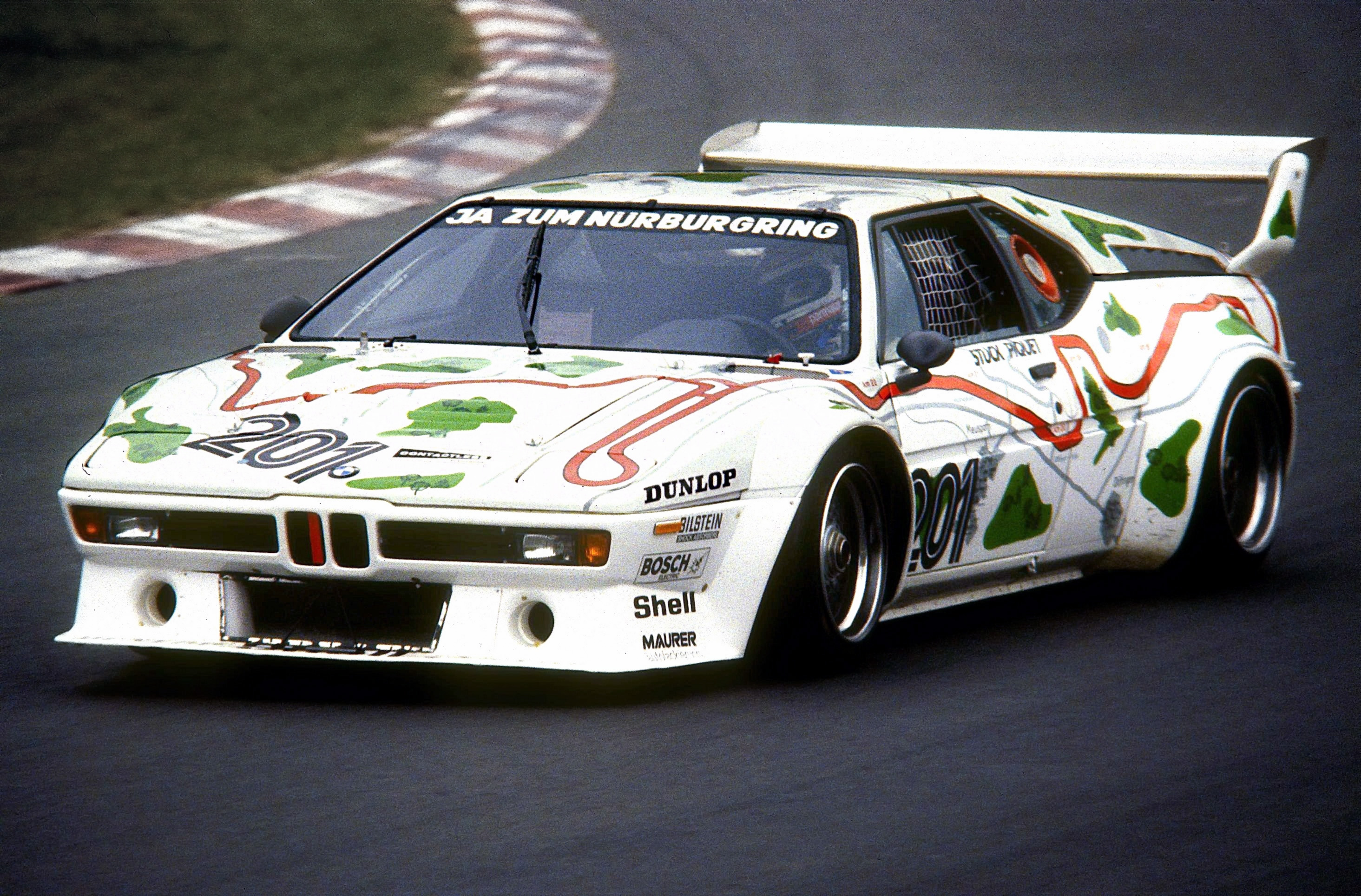
The BMW M1.

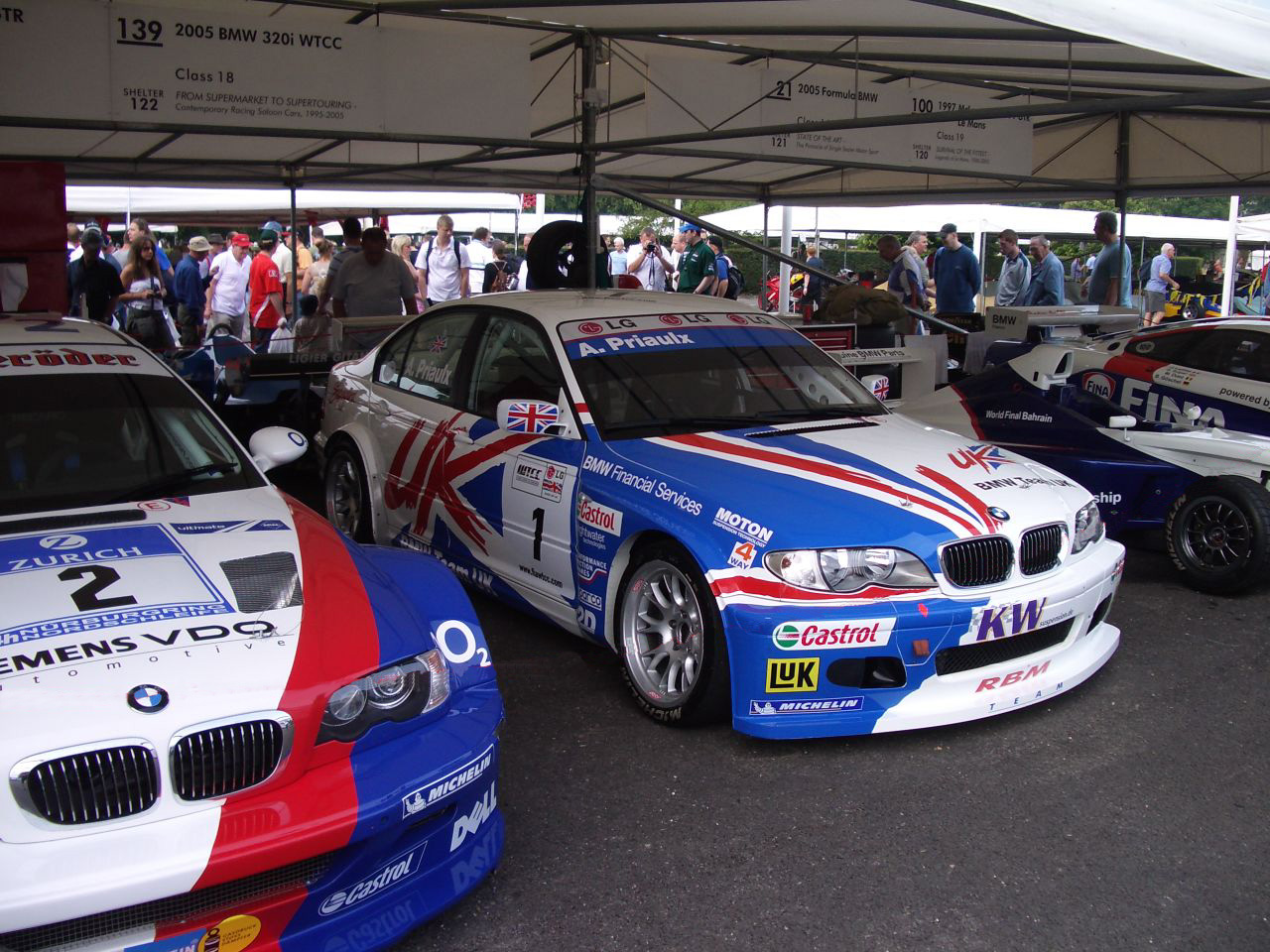
A 320i WTCC 2005

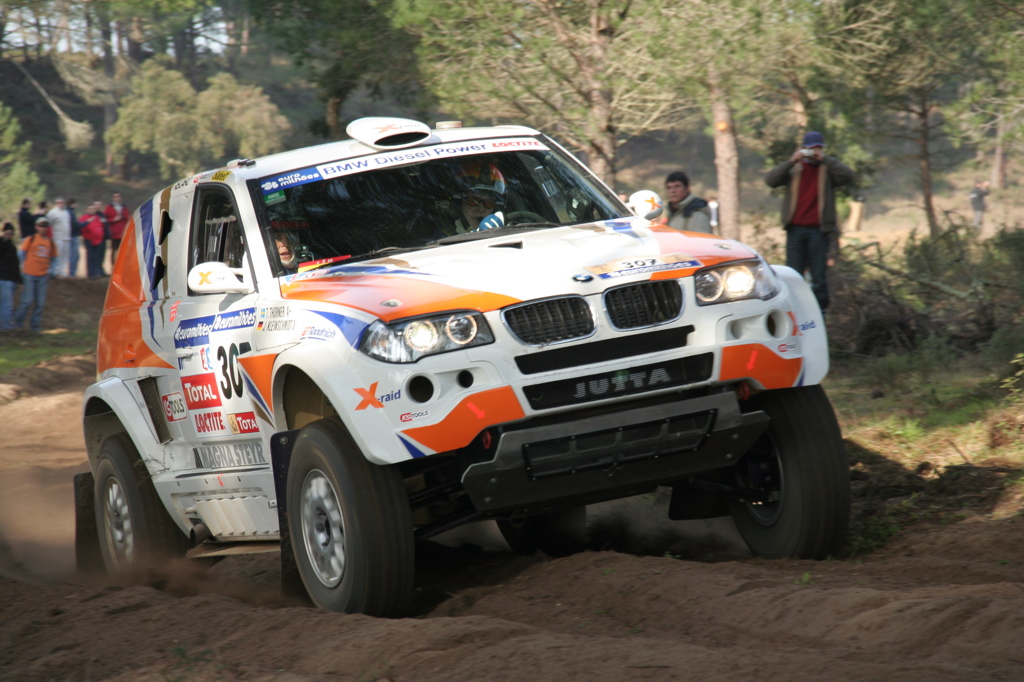
The X-Raid BMW X3 at Paris-Dakar Rally

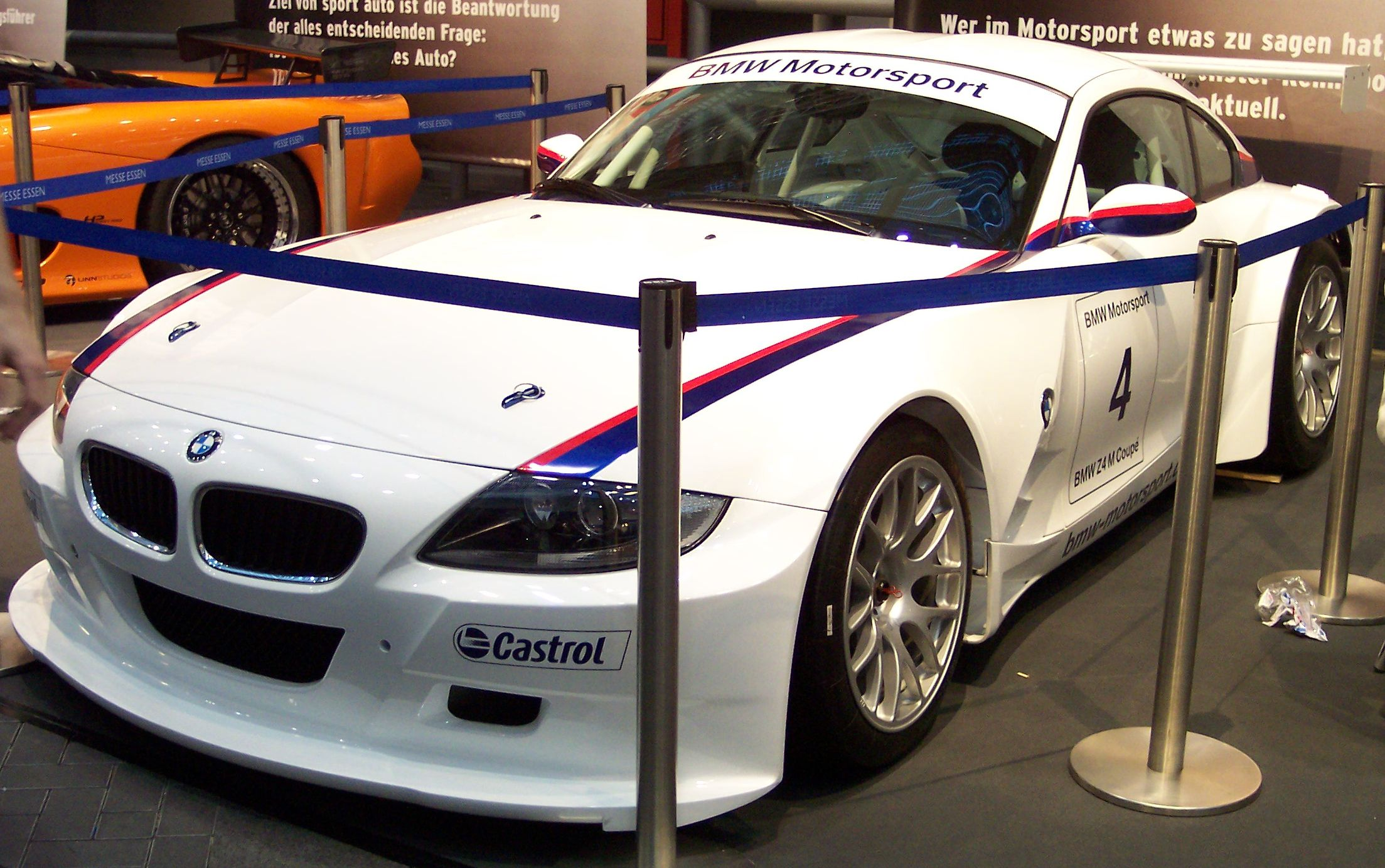
The Z4 M Coupe

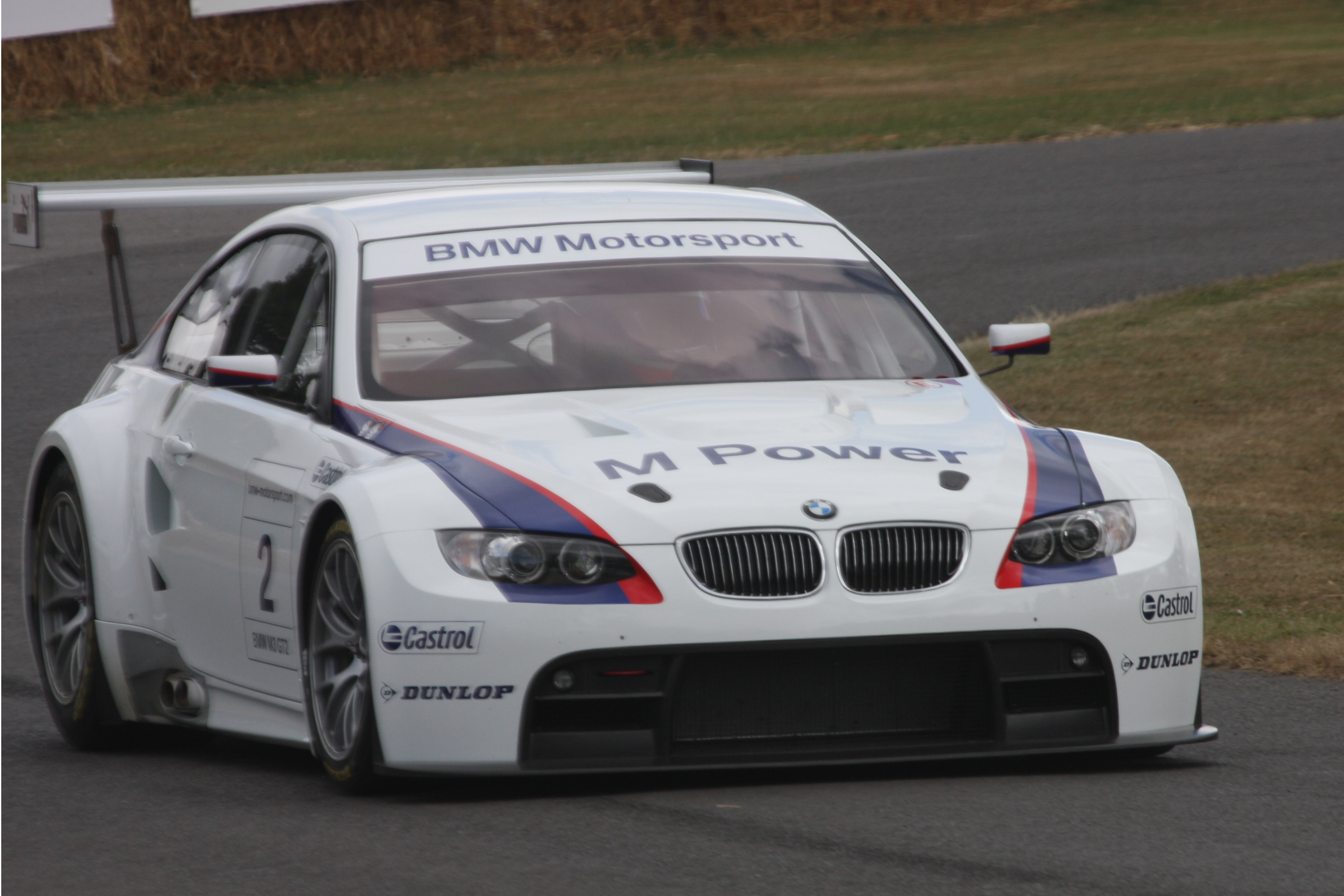
BMW M3 GT2 car competing in ALMS
