= BMW 270 =

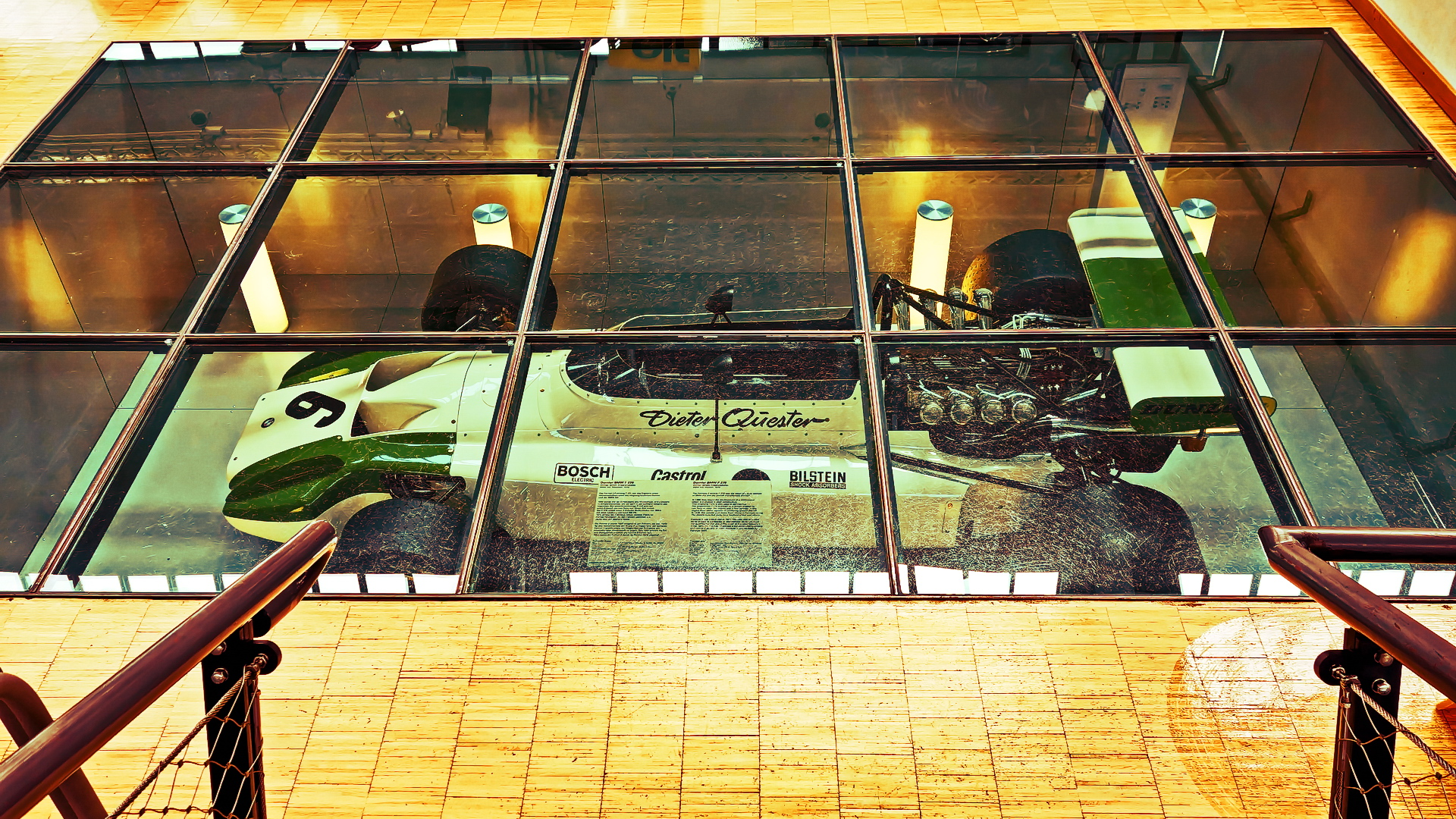
- Category: Formula 2
- Constructor: BMW
- Production: 1970
- Predecessor: BMW 269

Technical specifications
- Chassis: Aluminum Monocoque
- Engine: BMW M12, 1,496 cubic centimetres (91.3 cubic inches; 1.496 litres), L4, NA
- Torque: 240 newton-metres (180 pound force-feet)
- Power: 250 horsepower (190 kilowatts)
- Weight: 450 kilograms (990 pounds)

Competition history
- Debut: 1970

The BMW 270, also known as the BMW F270, is an open-wheel Formula 2 race car. It was designed, developed and built by BMW to participate in the 1970 Formula 2 European Championships.

== Racing history ==
BMW, evolving the previous 269, provided its drivers with a very competitive car, which despite not succeeding in ousting the dominance of the Cosworth-powered single-seaters, achieved two victories and high-level results in the 1970 Formula 2 European Championship, before retiring. of the Bavarian stable from the competition. Flanked by the previous BMW 269, on its debut at Thruxton the car, driven by the well-known Jacky Ickx, immediately went to the points. In the untitled Grand Prix of Rouen, Siffert also obtained the first victory for the car, which at The Mediterranean Grand Prix will always be placed with Siffert in second place and with Ickx in the third position, after the Belgian also obtained the pole position and the fastest lap. The latter also, in the double Austrian trip, will win both the untitled Grand Prix in Salzburg and the regular race in Tulln. After a series of retirements, the car driven by Dieter Quester will also manage to win the Grand Prix of Baden-Württemberg - Hesse at Hockenheim, which race will also mark the last disputed by the BMW manufacturer in Formula 2. However, the last race where the 270 ran was on November 29, when Dieter Quester won the 1970 Macau Grand Prix by also marking the fastest lap.
