= BMW 269 =

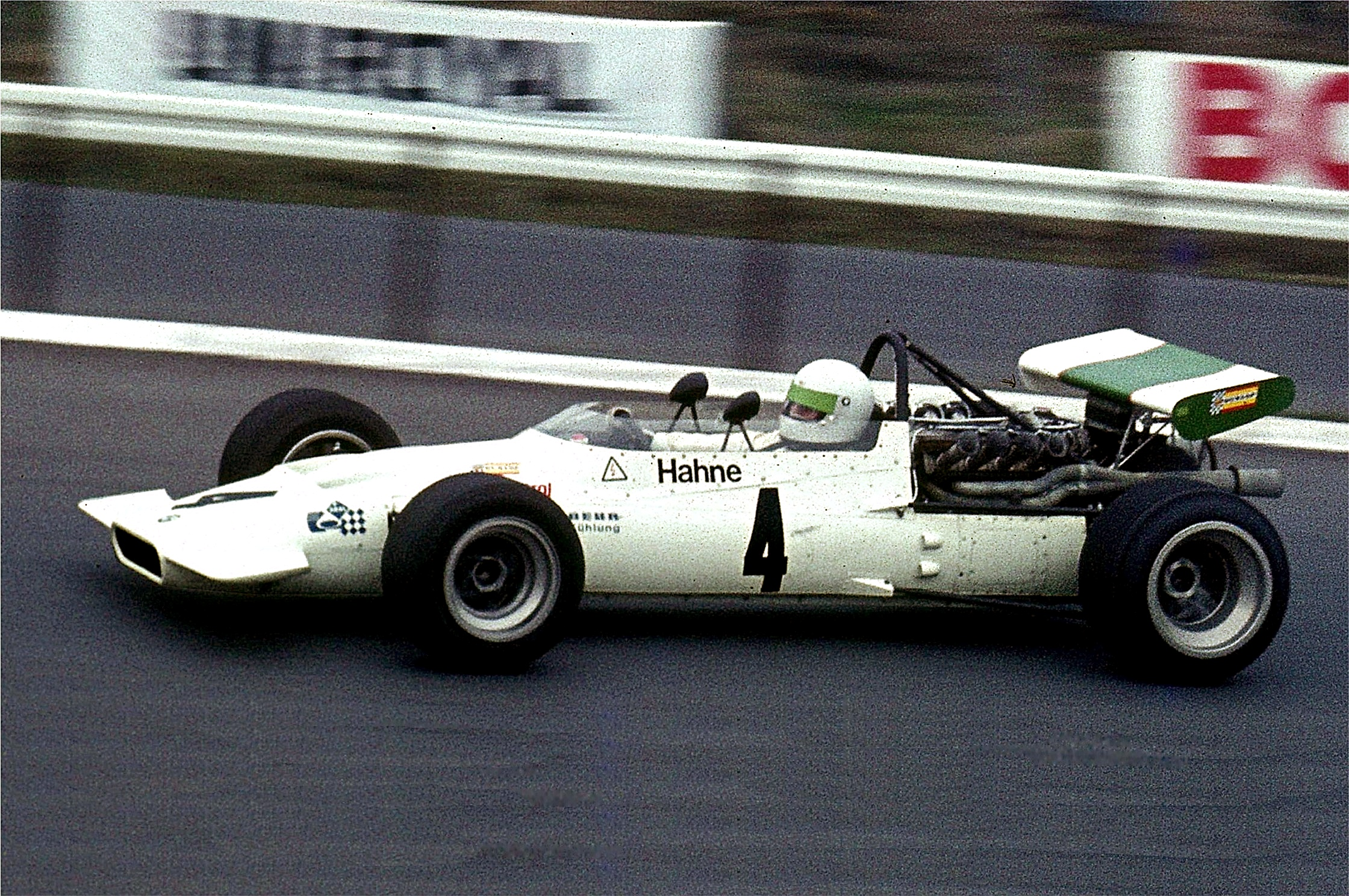
- Category: Formula 2
- Predecessor: BMW HH
- Successor: BMW 270

Technical specifications
- Engine: BMW M12 1,598 cubic centimetres (97.5 cu in) N/A
- Torque: 300 N⋅m (220 lb⋅ft)
- Transmission: 6-speed Manual
- Power: 250 hp (190 kW)
- Weight: 690 kg (1,520 lb)

Competition history
Wins	Podiums
6	8

The BMW 269, also known as the BMW F269, is an open-wheel Formula 2 race car. Designed by Len Terry, its chassis was built by aircraft company Dornier for BMW to participate in the 1969 and 1970 Formula 2 European Championships. It also took part the 1969 Formula One World Championship as F2 cars were admitted to the 1969 German Grand Prix on the very long Nürburgring, and exemption that was started in the 1950s.

== Description ==
The need for BMW to develop an additional single-seater to confirm the growth period in Formula 2, prompted the Bavarian house to build, always supported by Lola, an evolution of the already used Lola T102. The car was therefore designed in 1969 by Len Terry, the single-seaters were partially built by Lola and assembled by BMW itself to be then used mainly in Formula 2 competitions. The engine was a BMW M12 from 1,598 cc (97.5 cu in) 4-cylinder in-line with an output of approx 250 hp (190 kW) delivered @ 10,700 rpm.

== Racing history ==
The BMW 269 made its first appearance in Formula 2 during the 1969 Madrid Grand Prix, where, however, due to technical problems, it was not used by Hubert Hahne who had to start with the reserve T102. In Austria at Tulln, Hahne himself finished seventh, sanctioning the best result of the season for the single-seater in Formula 2.

On the long Nürburgring, lower category cars were admitted to take part in the 1969 German Grand Prix, thus the F2 car was also used in Formula 1. BMW lined up three cars with Hubert Hahne, Gerhard Mitter and Dieter Quester. During Friday's free practice at the German Grand Prix, Mitter went off the track and crashed into the barriers, and was killed instantly. with possible mechanical failure, the accident forced the Bavarian team to withdraw the remaining cars. In addition, Mitter's team mates at Porsche, Hans Herrmann, withdrew his Lotus entry, and Udo Schütz retired from racing altogether.

After this brief interlude in the top motorsport championship, the 269 driven by Hahne, Jo Siffert and Quester continued the Formula 2 season with 4 retirements, without being able to score any points. The beginning of 1970 saw the car conquer the first points finishes, with Hahne who, after failing to qualify at Thruxton, finished fourth overall at Hockenheim, and with Quester, who after retiring in Germany, where he had also set the fastest lap, finished fifth in Barcelona. The car's first victory came with Hahne on 14 June at Hockenheim, in the untitled race of the Rhine Cup. The rest of the season, however, was anonymous for the car that with a series of withdrawals due to accidents and mechanical problems will no longer be able to score useful results for the team which will see, more and more frequently, prefer to field the definitive evolution of the single-seater, the BMW 270, which will make BMW gain affirmed competitiveness with the first, then with the retirement of the house become the last, successes in Formula 2.

== Formula One World Championship results ==
Year	Entrant	Engine	Tyres	Drivers	1	2	3	4	5	6	7	8	9	10	11	Points	WCC
1969	Bayerische Motoren Werke AG	BMW M12/1 1.6 L4	D		RSA	ESP	MON	NED	FRA	GBR	GER	ITA	CAN	USA	MEX	—N/a	
1969	Bayerische Motoren Werke AG	BMW M12/1 1.6 L4	D	(West Germany) Hubert Hahne							DNS					—N/a	
1969	Bayerische Motoren Werke AG	BMW M12/1 1.6 L4	D	(West Germany) Gerhard Mitter							DNS					—N/a	
1969	Bayerische Motoren Werke AG	BMW M12/1 1.6 L4	D	(Austria) Dieter Quester							DNS					—N/a	
