= Championnat de France de la Montagne =

French hill climb championship

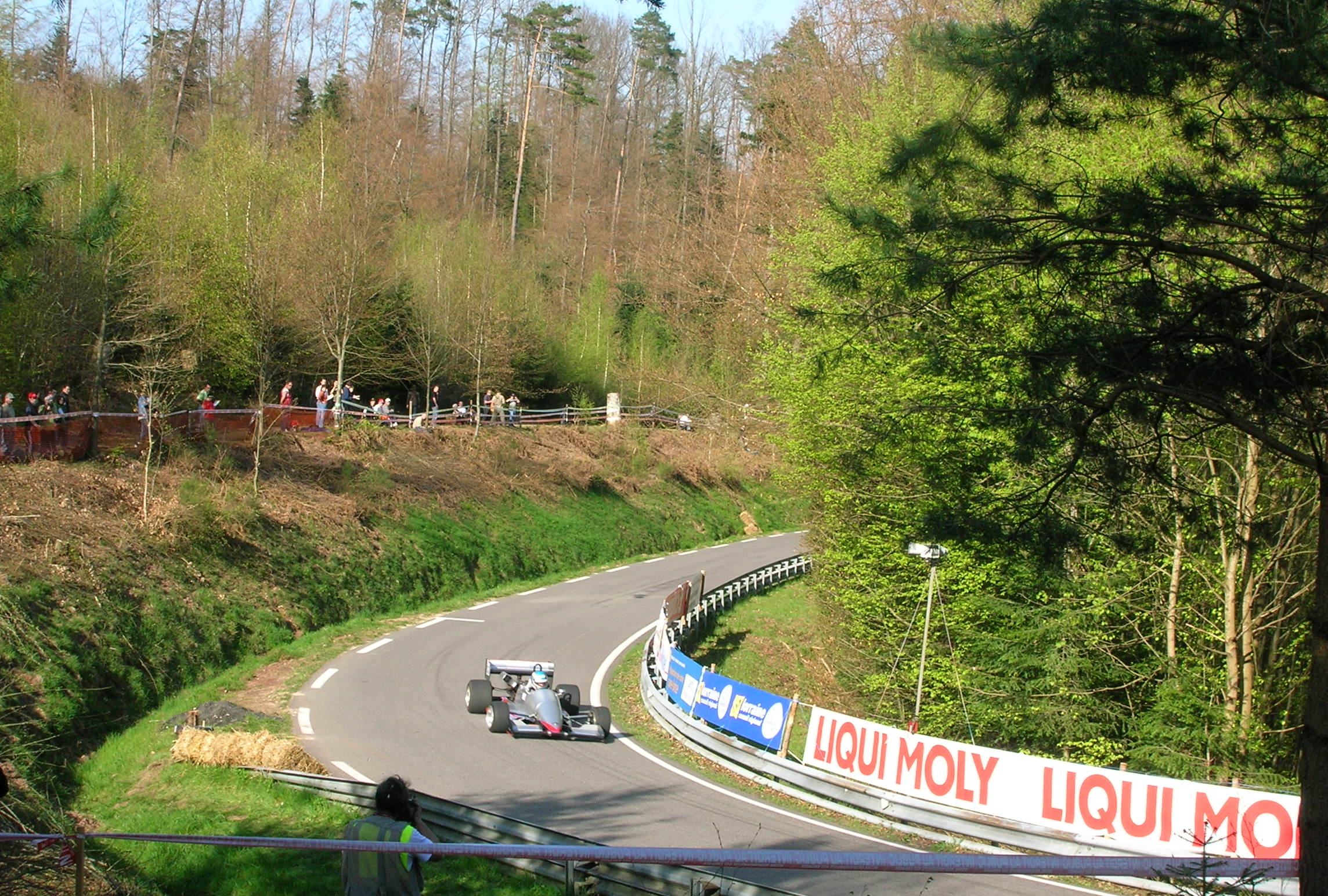
Single seater at the Abreschviller hillclimb, 2008

The French hill climb championship, or Championnat de France de la Montagne started in 1967 and rapidly became one of the continent's most competitive national series. For much of its history, the leading cars have been from Formula 2 (later Formula 3000 from 1985) or 2-litre sports cars. Some F1 cars were seen in the 1960s and occasionally in the 1970s (for example Daniel Rouveyran's March 721G in 1973) and Hervé Bayard also tried a Formula 5000 car in the early 1970s.

Marces Tarrès won the championship 10 times between 1982 and 1992. Nicolas Schatz holds the record for most consecutives titles: 7, between 2010 and 2016.

The best known champion outside of France is Guy Fréquelin. Other well known rally drivers were regular participants, such as Jean Vinatier, Gérard Larrousse, Jean-Luc Thérier or Jean-François Mas. Several French Formula One drivers have taken part in the championship too, such as Robert Manzon, Maurice Trintignant, Jean Behra, Jean-Pierre Beltoise, François Cevert or Jean-Pierre Jabouille.

Three French hill climb champions have also won the European championship: Robert "Jimmy" Mieusset (1973 and 1974), Jean-Marie Alméras (1978, 1979 and 1980), and Lional Régal (2008).

== Champions ==
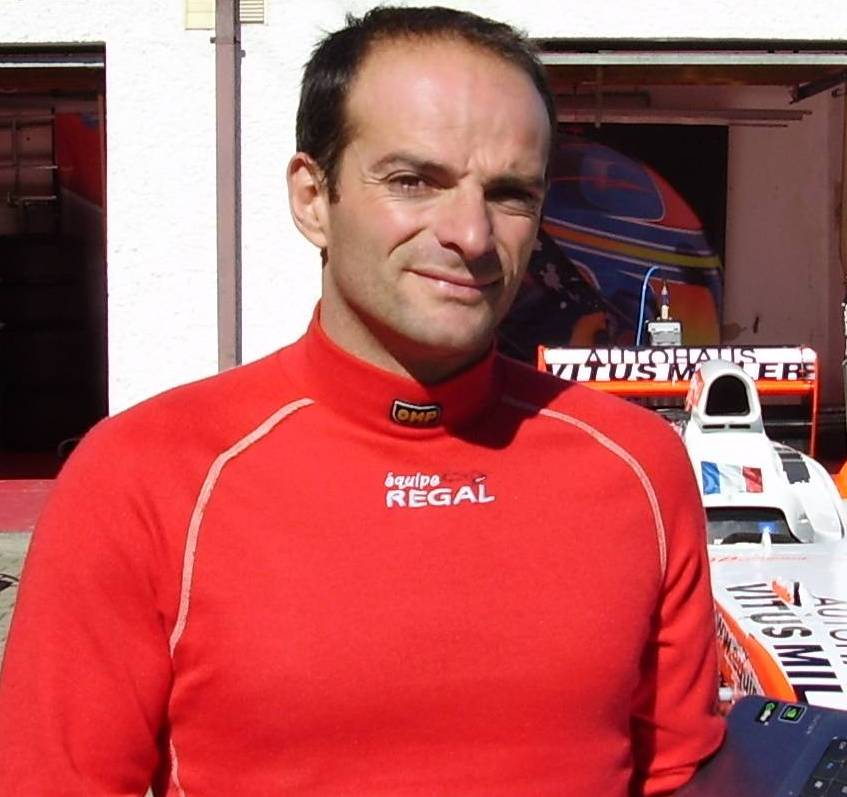
Lionel Régal won the championship 5 times between 2005 and 2009, before his death at a Swiss hill climb in 2010.

| Year | Driver | Car |
|---|---|---|
| 2023 | Geoffrey Schatz | Nova Proto NP01 |
| 2022 | Billy Ritchen | Nova NP01 Judd |
| 2021 | Geoffrey Schatz | Nova Proto NP01 |
| 2020 | Geoffrey Schatz | Norma M20-FC E2SC |
| 2019 | Geoffrey Schatz | Norma M20-FC E2SC |
| 2018 | Sébastien Petit | Norma M20-FC |
| 2017 | Sébastien Petit | Norma M20-FC |
| 2016 | Nicolas Schatz | Norma M20-FC |
| 2015 | Nicolas Schatz | Norma M20-FC |
| 2014 | Nicolas Schatz | Norma M20-FC |
| 2013 | Nicolas Schatz | Norma M20-FC |
| 2012 | Nicolas Schatz | Reynard 99-Formula Nippon |
| 2011 | Nicolas Schatz | Lola T94/50 F3000 |
| 2010 | Nicolas Schatz | Lola T94/50 F3000 |
| 2009 | Lionel Régal | Reynard 1KL-Formula Nippon |
| 2008 | Lionel Régal | Reynard 1KL-Formula Nippon |
| 2007 | Lionel Régal | Reynard 1KL-Formula Nippon |
| 2006 | Lionel Régal | Reynard 95D |
| 2005 | Lionel Régal | Reynard 95D |
| 2004 | Bernard Chambérod | Reynard 92D |
| 2003 | Bernard Chambérod | Reynard 92D |
| 2002 | Bernard Chambérod | Reynard 92D |
| 2001 | Bernard Chambérod | Reynard 92D |
| 2000 | Bernard Chambérod | Reynard 92D |
| 1999 | Daniel Boccard | Martini MK69-BMW F2 |
| 1998 | Daniel Boccard | Martini MK69-BMW F2 |
| 1997 | Daniel Boccard | Martini MK69-BMW F2 |
| 1996 | Daniel Boccard | Martini MK69-BMW F2 |
| 1995 | Christian Debias | Martini MK58B-BMW F2 |
| 1994 | Christian Debias | Martini MK58B-BMW F2 |
| 1993 | Daniel Boccard | Martini MK56T-BMW F2 |
| 1992 | Marcel Tarrès | Martini MK56T-BMW F2 |
| 1991 | Marcel Tarrès | Martini MK56T-BMW F2 |
| 1990 | Marcel Tarrès | Martini MK56T-BMW F2 |
| 1989 | Marcel Tarrès | Martini MK56T-BMW F2 |
| 1988 | Marcel Tarrès | Martini MK45-BMW |
| 1987 | Daniel Boccard | Martini M01B-BMW |
| 1986 | Marcel Tarrès | Martini MK45-BMW |
| 1985 | Marcel Tarrès | Martini MK43-BMW |
| 1984 | Marcel Tarrès | Martini T01-BMW and Martini MK43-BMW |
| 1983 | Marcel Tarrès | Martini T01-BMW |
| 1982 | Marcel Tarrès | Martini MK28-BMW F2 |
| 1981 | Marc Sourd | Martini MK31-ROC F2 |
| 1980 | Jean-Christian Duby | Ford Escort 1800 RS |
| 1979 | Guy Fréquelin | Martini MK25-BMW F2 |
| 1978 | Jean-Marie Alméras | Porsche 935 L |
| 1977 | Christian Debias | Ralt RT1-BMW F2 |
| 1976 | Michel Pignard | March 762-BMW F2 |
| 1975 | Jimmy Mieusset | March 742-BMW F2 |
| 1974 | Jimmy Mieusset | March 742-BMW F2 |
| 1973 | Jimmy Mieusset | March 722 F2 |
| 1972 | Jimmy Mieusset | March 722 F2 |
| 1971 | Jimmy Mieusset | Pygmée MDB15 Ford FVA F2 |
| 1970 | Hervé Bayard | Tecno Ford F2 |
| 1969 | Daniel Rouveyran | Tecno Ford F2 |
| 1968 | Pierre Maublanc | Abarth 2000 |
| 1967 | Pierre Maublanc | Abarth 2000 |
