= 1972 Pau Grand Prix =

Race details
- Date: 5 May 1972
- Official name: XXXII Pau Grand Prix
- Location: Pau, France
- Course: Temporary Street Circuit
- Course length: 2.760 km (1.720 miles)
- Distance: 70 laps, 193.200 km (120.048 miles)

Pole position
Driver	Determined by heats	

Fastest lap
Driver	(France) Jean-Pierre Jaussaud	Brabham-Ford
- Time: 1:15.5

Podium
First	(United Kingdom) Peter Gethin	Chevron-Ford
Second	(France) Patrick Depailler	March-Ford
Third	(United Kingdom) David Purley	March-Ford

The 1972 Pau Grand Prix was a Formula Two motor race held on 5 May 1972 at the Pau circuit, in Pau, Pyrénées-Atlantiques, France. The Grand Prix was won by Peter Gethin, driving the Chevron B20. Patrick Depailler finished second and David Purley third.

== Classification ==
=== Race ===
Pos	No	Driver	Vehicle	Laps	Time/Retired	Grid
1	20	(United Kingdom) Peter Gethin	Chevron-Ford	70	1hr 33min 40.8sec	
2	25	(France) Patrick Depailler	March-Ford	70	+ 0.9 s	
3	33	(United Kingdom) David Purley	March-Ford	68	+ 2 laps	
4	10	(France) Jean-Pierre Jaussaud	Brabham-Ford	66	+ 4 laps	
5	36	(United Kingdom) Mike Hailwood	Surtees-Ford	66	+ 4 laps	
6	1	(Sweden) Reine Wisell	GRD-Ford	65	+ 5 laps	
7	7	(France) Bob Wollek	Brabham-Ford	64	+ 6 laps	
Ret	31	(United Kingdom) Graham Birrel	March-Ford	48	Heat gasket	
Ret	16	(United Kingdom) Peter Westbury	Brabham-Ford	46	Oil leak	
Ret	40	(United Kingdom) Roger Williamson	March-Ford	37	Oil leak	
Ret	6	(Brazil) Emerson Fittipaldi	Lotus-Ford	48	Oil leak	
Ret	29	(Austria) Niki Lauda	March-Ford	25	Driveshaft	
Ret	2	(United Kingdom) Graham Hill	Brabham-Ford	8	Oil leak	
Ret	3	(France) Jean-Pierre Beltoise	March-Ford	7	Accident	
Ret	38	(Italy) Andrea de Adamich	Surtees-Ford	6	Accident	
Ret	30	(Germany) Jochen Mass	March-Ford	0	Collision	
Ret	22	(France) Patrick Dal Bo	Pygmée-Ford	0	Accident	
Fastest Lap: Jean-Pierre Jaussaud (Brabham-Ford) - 1:15.5

Preceded by 1971 Pau Grand Prix	Pau Grand Prix; 1972	Succeeded by 1973 Pau Grand Prix
