= 1974 Pau Grand Prix =

Race details
- Date: 5 May 1974
- Official name: XXXIV Pau Grand Prix
- Location: Pau, France
- Course: Temporary Street Circuit
- Course length: 2.760 km (1.720 miles)
- Distance: 75 laps, 207.000 km (128.624 miles)
- Weather: Rain

Pole position
| Driver | (France) Patrick Depailler | March-BMW |
- Time: 1:16.1

Fastest lap
| Driver | (France) Jacques Laffite | March-BMW |
- Time: 1:28.6

Podium
| First | (France) Patrick Depailler | March-BMW |
| Second | (France) Jacques Laffite | March-BMW |
| Third | (United Kingdom) Andy Sutcliffe | March-BMW |

The 1974 Pau Grand Prix was a Formula Two motor race held on 5 May 1974 at the Pau circuit, in Pau, Pyrénées-Atlantiques, France. The Grand Prix was won by Patrick Depailler, driving the March 742. Jacques Laffite finished second and Andy Sutcliffe third.

== Classification ==
=== Race ===
| Pos | No | Driver | Vehicle | Laps | Time/retired | Grid |
|---|---|---|---|---|---|---|
| 1 | 9 | (France) Patrick Depailler | March-BMW | 75 | 1hr 54min 33.5sec | 1 |
| 2 | 16 | (France) Jacques Laffite | March-BMW | 74 | + 1 lap | |
| 3 | 20 | (United Kingdom) Andy Sutcliffe | March-BMW | 74 | + 1 lap | |
| 4 | 5 | (France) Jean-Pierre Jabouille | Alpine-BMW | 74 | + 1 lap | |
| 5 | 7 | (France) Michel Leclère | Alpine-BMW | 74 | + 1 lap | |
| 6 | 1 | (Australia) Tim Schenken | Surtees-BMW | 73 | + 2 laps | |
| 7 | 12 | (United Kingdom) David Purley | March-BMW | 72 | + 3 laps | |
| 8 | 15 | (Japan) Masami Kuwashima | March-BMW | 71 | + 4 laps | |
| 9 | 27 | (Italy) Giancarlo Martini | March-BMW | 71 | + 4 laps | |
| 10 | 11 | (France) Jacques Coulon | March-BMW | 68 | + 7 laps | |
| 11 | 19 | (Italy) Gabriele Serblin | March-BMW | 68 | + 7 laps | |
| Ret | 8 | (France) Alain Serpaggi | Alpine-BMW | 49 | Oil pressure | |
| Ret | 26 | (France) Jimmy Mieusset | March-BMW | 44 | Tyres | |
| Ret | 6 | (France) Patrick Tambay | Alpine-BMW | 22 | Accident | |
| Ret | 28 | (Italy) Paolo Bozzetto | March-BMW | 14 | Radiator | |
| Ret | 17 | (France) Jean-Pierre Paoli | March-BMW | 12 | Accident | |
| Ret | 4 | (France) José Dolhem | Surtees-Ford | 10 | Electrical | |
| Ret | 10 | (Germany) Hans-Joachim Stuck | March-BMW | 1 | Accident | |
| Ret | 3 | (United Kingdom) John Watson | Surtees-BMW | 1 | Accident | |
| DNS | 14 | (Austria) Dieter Quester | March-BMW | | Did not start | |
| DNS | 21 | (Italy) Maurizio Flammini | March-BMW | | Did not start | |
| DNS | 25 | (United States) Bill Gubelmann | March-BMW | | Did not start | |
| DNQ | 22 | (Italy) Duilio Truffo | March-BMW | | Did not qualify | |
| DNQ | 23 | (Ecuador) Guillermo Ortega | Surtees-BMW | | Did not qualify | |
| DNQ | 24 | (Ecuador) Fausto Morello | Surtees-BMW | | Did not qualify | |
Fastest Lap: Jacques Laffite (March-BMW) - 1:28.6

| Preceded by 1973 Pau Grand Prix | Pau Grand Prix; 1974 | Succeeded by 1975 Pau Grand Prix |
