= 1975 Pau Grand Prix =

Race details
- Date: 19 May 1975
- Official name: XXXV Pau Grand Prix
- Location: Pau, France
- Course: Temporary Street Circuit
- Course length: 2.760 km (1.720 miles)
- Distance: 73 laps, 201.480 km (125.193 miles)

Pole position
Driver	(France) Jacques Laffite	Martini-BMW
- Time: 1:13.61

Fastest lap
Driver	(France) Jacques Laffite	Martini-BMW
- Time: 1:14.68

Podium
First	(France) Jacques Laffite	Martini-BMW
Second	(France) Jean-Pierre Jabouille	Elf-BMW
Third	(France) Patrick Depailler	March-BMW

The 1975 Pau Grand Prix was a Formula Two motor race held on 19 May 1975 at the Pau circuit, in Pau, Pyrénées-Atlantiques, France. The Grand Prix was won by Jacques Laffite, driving the Martini. Jean-Pierre Jabouille finished second and Patrick Depailler third.

== Classification ==
=== Race ===
Pos	No	Driver	Vehicle	Laps	Time/retired	Grid
1	1	(France) Jacques Laffite	Martini-BMW	73	1hr 32min 10.7sec	1
2	6	(France) Jean-Pierre Jabouille	Elf-BMW	73	+ 16.5 s	
3		(France) Patrick Depailler	March-BMW	73	+ 56.4 s	
4		(France) Gérard Larrousse	Elf-BMW	72	+ 1 lap	
5	2	(France) Michel Leclère	March-BMW	72	+ 1 lap	
6	22	(Italy) Diulio Truffo	Osella-BMW	72	+ 1 lap	
7		(Belgium) Claude Bourgoignie	March-BMW	72	+ 1 lap	
8		(Switzerland) Loris Kessel	March-BMW	69	+ 4 laps	
9		(Italy) Alberto Colombo	March-BMW	69	+ 4 laps	
NC		(Italy) Sandro Cinotti	March-BMW	59	Not Classified	
NC		(France) Jean-Pierre Beltoise	Chevron-Chrysler	45	Not Classified	
Ret		(France) Patrick Tambay	March-BMW	41	Accident	
Ret		(Italy) Gabriele Serblin	March-BMW	41	Accident	
Ret		(Austria) Harald Ertl	Chevron-BMW	41	Accident	
Ret		(Italy) Giorgio Francia	Osella-BMW	38	Puncture	
Ret		(France) Maxime Bochet	Chevron-Ford	34	Puncture	
Ret		(Austria) Hans Binder	March-BMW	29	Clutch	
Ret		(Germany) Willi Deutsch	March-BMW	9	Engine	
DSQ		(United Kingdom) Brian Henton	March-Ford	12	Disqualified	
DNQ		(Belgium) Bernard de Bryver	March-BMW		Did not qualify	
DNQ		(Italy) Giancarlo Martini	March-BMW		Did not qualify	
DNQ		(France) Xavier Lapeyre	Chevron-Chrysler		Did not qualify	
Fastest Lap: Jacques Laffite (Martini-BMW) - 1:14.68

Preceded by 1974 Pau Grand Prix	Pau Grand Prix; 1975	Succeeded by 1976 Pau Grand Prix
