= 1973 Pau Grand Prix =

Race details
- Date: 6 May 1973
- Official name: XXXIII Pau Grand Prix
- Location: Pau, France
- Course: Temporary Street Circuit
- Course length: 2.760 km (1.720 miles)
- Distance: 70 laps, 193.200 km (120.048 miles)

Pole position
| Driver | (France) Jean-Pierre Jarier | March-BMW |
- Time: 1:15.0

Fastest lap
| Driver | (France) Jean-Pierre Beltoise | March-BMW |
- Time: 1:15.0

Podium
| First | (France) François Cevert | Alpine-Ford |
| Second | (France) Jean-Pierre Jarier | March-BMW |
| Third | (Australia) Tim Schenken | Motul-Ford |

The 1973 Pau Grand Prix was a Formula Two motor race held on 6 May 1973 at the Pau circuit, in Pau, Pyrénées-Atlantiques, France. The Grand Prix was won by François Cevert, driving the Alpine A367. Jean-Pierre Jarier finished second and Tim Schenken third.

== Classification ==
=== Race ===
| Pos | No | Driver | Vehicle | Laps | Time/retired | Grid |
|---|---|---|---|---|---|---|
| 1 | 10 | (France) François Cevert | Alpine-Ford | 70 | 1hr 30min 49.77sec | |
| 2 | 1 | (France) Jean-Pierre Jarier | March-BMW | 70 | + 24.67 s | 1 |
| 3 | 3 | (Australia) Tim Schenken | Motul-Ford | 70 | + 35.93 s | |
| 4 | | (United Kingdom) Mike Beuttler | March-BMW | 69 | + 1 lap | |
| 5 | 14 | (France) Bob Wollek | Motul-Ford | 69 | + 1 lap | |
| 6 | 12 | (France) Jean-Pierre Jaussaud | Motul-BMW | 69 | + 1 lap | |
| 7 | 22 | (United Kingdom) Roger Williamson | GRD-Ford | 68 | + 2 laps | |
| 8 | 6 | (Sweden) Sten Gunnarsson | GRD-Ford | 68 | + 2 laps | |
| 9 | | (Japan) Hiroshi Kazato | GRD-Ford | 68 | + 2 laps | |
| 10 | 33 | (United Kingdom) Graham Birrell | Chevron-Ford | 66 | + 4 laps | |
| 11 | 25 | (Japan) Tetsu Ikuzawa | GRD-Ford | 64 | + 6 laps | |
| 12 | 2 | (France) Jean-Pierre Beltoise | March-BMW | 62 | + 8 laps | |
| Ret | 5 | (Sweden) Reine Wisell | GRD-Cosworth | 51 | Oil pressure | |
| Ret | 31 | (Switzerland) Silvio Moser | Surtees-Ford | 42 | Gear lever | |
| Ret | 9 | (France) Patrick Depailler | Alpine-Ford | 38 | Electrical | |
| Ret | | (Brazil) Wilson Fittipaldi | Brabham-Ford | 30 | Rear wing | |
| Ret | | (France) François Migault | Pygmée-Ford | 24 | Distributor | |
| Ret | | (United Kingdom) Dave Morgan | Chevron-Ford | 16 | Oil leak | |
| Ret | 18 | (Italy) Vittorio Brambilla | March-BMW | 15 | Oil pressure | |
| Ret | 19 | (Italy) Ernesto Brambilla | March-BMW | 0 | Accident | |
| DNQ | | (France) Patrick Dal Bo | Pygmée-Ford | | Did not qualify | |
| DNQ | | (Republic of Ireland) Brendan McInerney | GRD-Ford | | Did not qualify | |
| DNS | | (France) Jacques Coulon | March-BMW | | Did not start | |
| DNS | | (United Kingdom) Colin Vandervell | March-BMW | | Did not start | |
| DNS | | (United States) Bill Gubelmann | March-BMW | | Did not start | |
| DNS | | (United Kingdom) James Hunt | Surtees-Ford | | Did not start | |
| DNS | | (United Kingdom) John Wingfield | Brabham-Ford | | Did not start | |
| DNS | | (United Kingdom) Richard Scott | Scott-Ford | | Did not start | |
Fastest Lap: Jean-Pierre Beltoise (March-BMW) - 1:15.0

| Preceded by 1972 Pau Grand Prix | Pau Grand Prix; 1973 | Succeeded by 1974 Pau Grand Prix |
