= Alméras Frères =

French auto racing team

(France) Equipe Alméras Frères
- Founded: 1971
- Founder(s): Jean-Marie Alméras; Jacques Alméras
- Base: Montpellier, Hérault, France
- Former series: French Hill Climb Championship; European Hill Climb Championship; European Rally Championship; World Rally Championship; World Sportscar Championship; FFSA GT Championship; Porsche Carrera Cup France
- Drivers' Championships: French Hill Climb Championship: 1973, 1974, 1975, 1978; European Hill Climb Championship: 1978, 1979, 1980; European Rally Championship: 1980
- Website: http://www.almeras.com/

Equipe Alméras Frères (French: Alméras Brothers Team) is a French auto racing team founded by Jean-Marie Alméras and his brother Jacques Alméras in 1971. The racing team is an extension of the automotive dealership in Montpellier through which the brothers tune, develop, and restore Porsches, in which the team is commonly known as Porsche Alméras. Early success in French and European hill climbs led to rallying efforts across Europe, including overall victories at the Monte Carlo Rally and Tour de Corse, and the full support of Porsche in developing their 911 model for rallying. Small forays into sports car racing in the 1970s eventually shifted to the team running sports cars full-time in the 1980s, including multiple participations at the 24 Hours of Le Mans and eventually an effort in the World Sportscar Championship. By the 1990s the team returned to hill climbs and rallying while participating in French circuit championships including the Porsche Carrera Cup.

Jacques' son Philippe Alméras began driving for the team in the late 1990s before partnering with Jean-Pierre Champeau to create Pro GT by Alméras, a new team to continue the Alméras family name. Following success in several French sports car championships, Pro GT currently participates in the Porsche Supercup and Porsche Carrera Cup France. Equipe Alméras continues to participate in historic motorsport events with restorations of their own cars, still driven by Jean-Marie, while Jacques manages the company.

== History ==
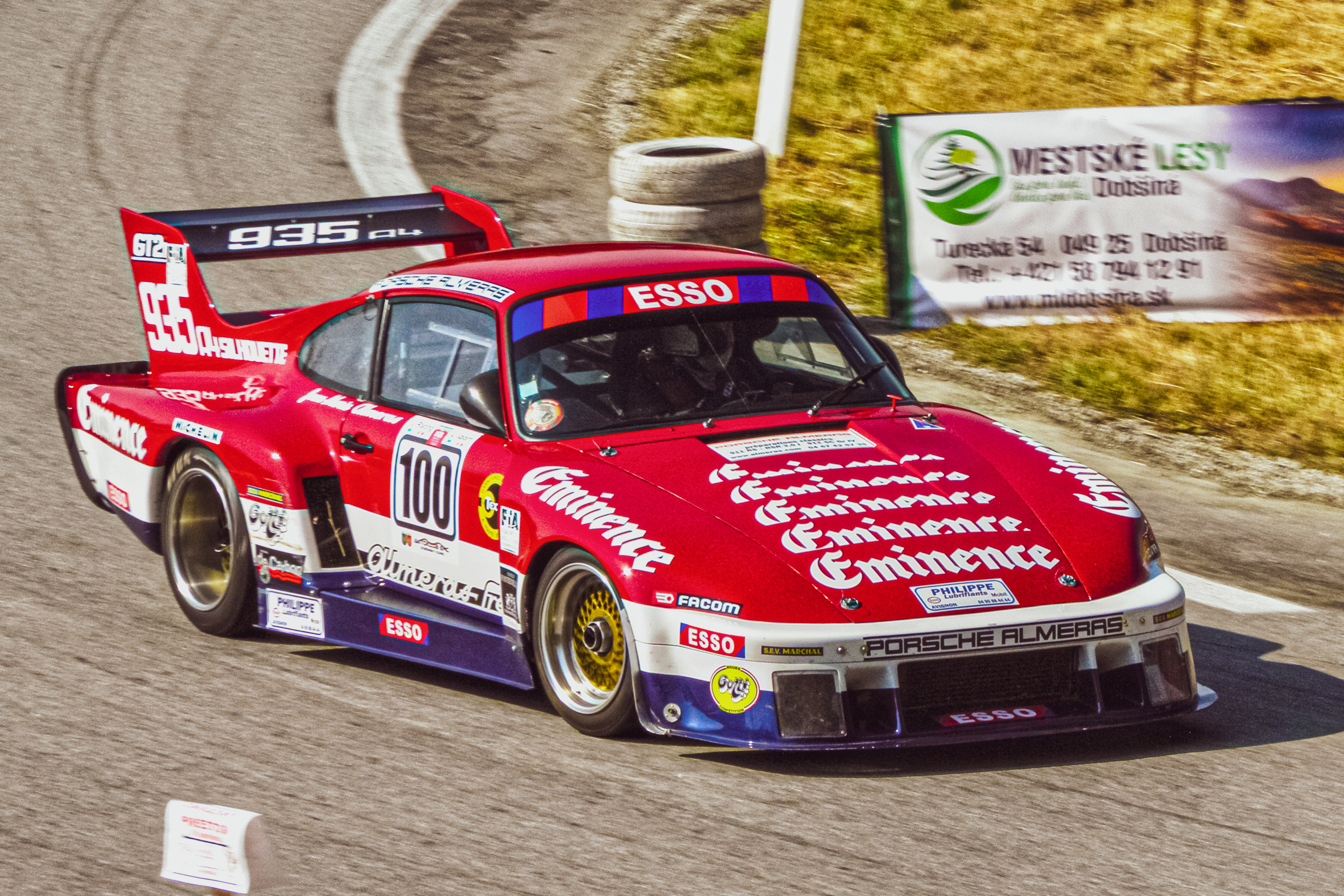
A Porsche 935 developed by Alméras Frères which won both the French and European Hill Climb Championships

Jean-Marie Alméras began his racing career in karts at the age of 16, earning a reputation in France for the construction of his own karts. In 1966 he opened a body shop to develop karts as well as improvements for road cars. Feeling the need to test his road car offerings, Jean-Marie was joined by his younger brother Jacques as co-driver to tackle the Critérium des Cévennes in their Peugeot 204. Jean-Marie and Jacques later sought support from an automotive manufacturer, making their first negotiations with French Peugeot and Renault before finally settling with Porsche. Jacques began to take his share of driving duties as well, competing in the Critérium des Cévennes and Tour de France with used Porsches, but eventually selling to customers the modifications they had made to their own cars. In 1971 the brothers formally created Equipe Alméras Frères and invested in a pair of Porsche 911s for the French Hill Climb Championship, Jacques competing in a Carrera RSR and Jean-Marie competing in a 911 S. The brothers won the championship in their respective classes consecutively from 1973 to 1975. Equipe Alméras also expands to sports car racing, entering a customer Porsche in the 1976 24 Hours of Le Mans where the team finished 23rd overall. The brothers began competing in the European Hill Climb Championship after conquering the French series, replacing their cars with newer and more powerful Porsche 934s and 935s. Jean-Marie becomes the European champion three years in a row with his 935, while Jacques won the touring car category title in the same years. The brothers also finished the French championship in first and second in 1978 before concentrating fully on the European campaign.

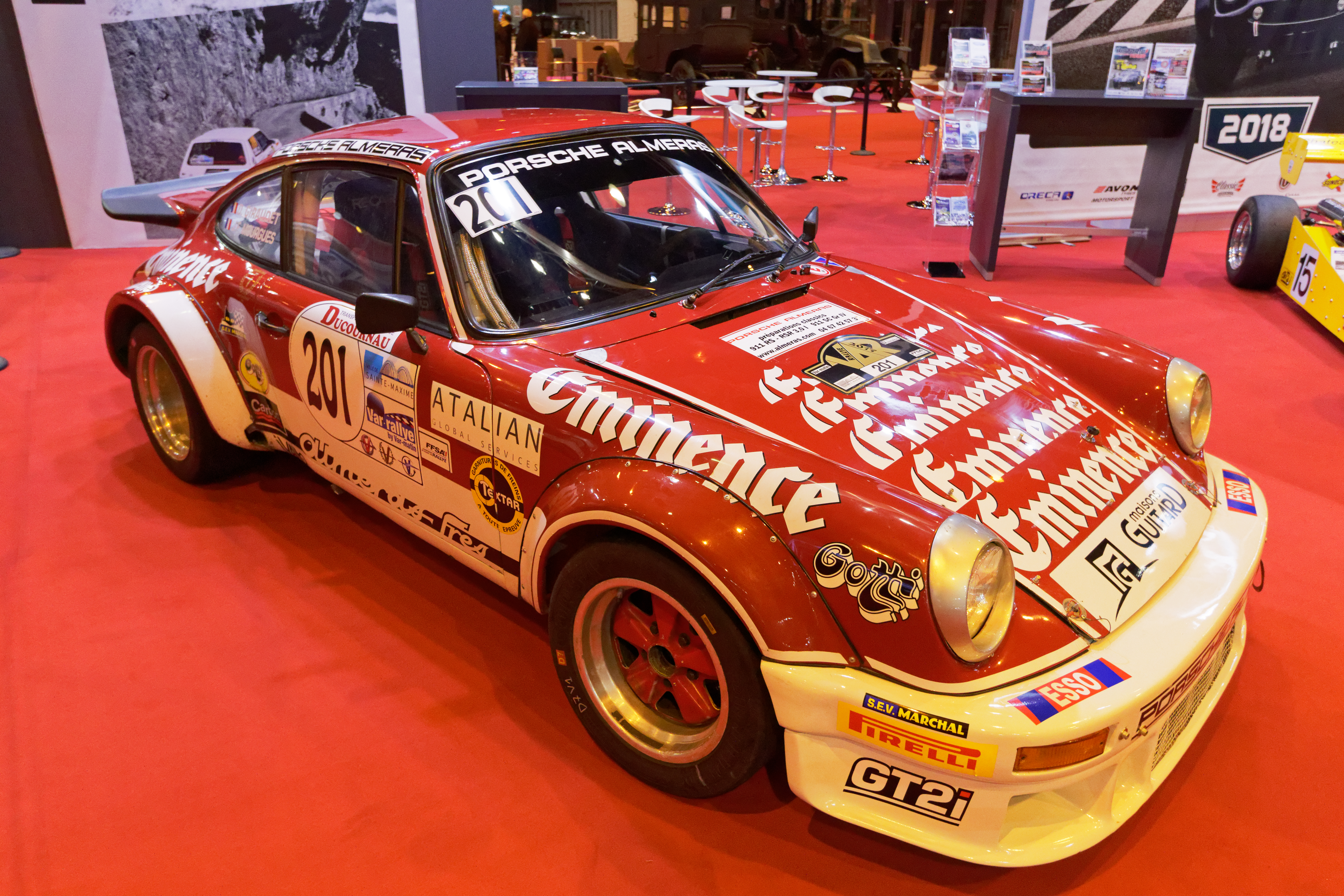
A former Equipe Alméras Frères Porsche 911 SC rally car

The 1978 campaign also involved Equipe Alméras' involvement in the World Rally Championship preparing a 911 SC for Jean-Pierre Nicolas with which he won the Monte Carlo Rally and helping Porsche to fourth in the championship; in return Porsche increased their investment for the team. The team participated in the European Rally Championship for several years, winning the title in 1980 with Antonio Zanini, while Jean-Luc Thérier won the Tour de Corse rally in the world championship that same year. Jean-Marie and Jacques also participated in the 24 Hours of Le Mans as drivers for the first time in 1980 before aiding in the development of the Porsche 924 Carrera GTR in 1981. Defending world rally drivers' champion Walter Röhrl drove for Alméras in the San Remo Rally in 1981, leading the event before a failure ended his rally. Jean-Marie was badly injured in a road accident in 1982, ending his campaign in the European Hill Climb Championship, but Jacques continued to rally alongside the team's customer entries, the team earning two podiums in the 1982 World Rally Championship. Equipe Alméras shifted to sports car racing in 1983 with the purchase of a Porsche 930 Turbo for the Group B category while also adapting the 924 for the French Superproduction Championship, later convincing former Formula One driver Jean-Pierre Beltoise to join the championship in their cars. The company also developed a unique road car, the Porsche 930 3.3 Bi-turbo Alméras, an adaptation of the 930 with twin turbochargers in place of the single turbocharger, increased displacement, and unique bodywork. Although never sold, Michelin later used the car for the development of performance road tyres.

The brothers purchased a Porsche 962C in 1989 to enter the World Sports-Prototype Championship, entering races outside Europe for the first time and developing unique bodywork for their prototype sports car yet never finding success in the series. Returning to 911s, the brothers shared an entry with Jacques Lafitte at Le Mans in 1994 before entering the French GT Championship and later Porsche Carrera Cup France. Jacques stepped back from racing to take over management within the team in the 1990s while his son Philippe begins his driving career, eventually racing for the team at the 2003 Spa 24 Hours. Philippe later earned his first attempt at Le Mans driving for Luc Alphand's racing team and finishing sixteenth while continuing to participate in French national championships en route to taking over the racing department of the family business. Jean-Marie continues to participate in historic motorsport driving, and winning, in many of the team's former cars.

=== Pro GT by Alméras ===
(France) Pro GT by Alméras
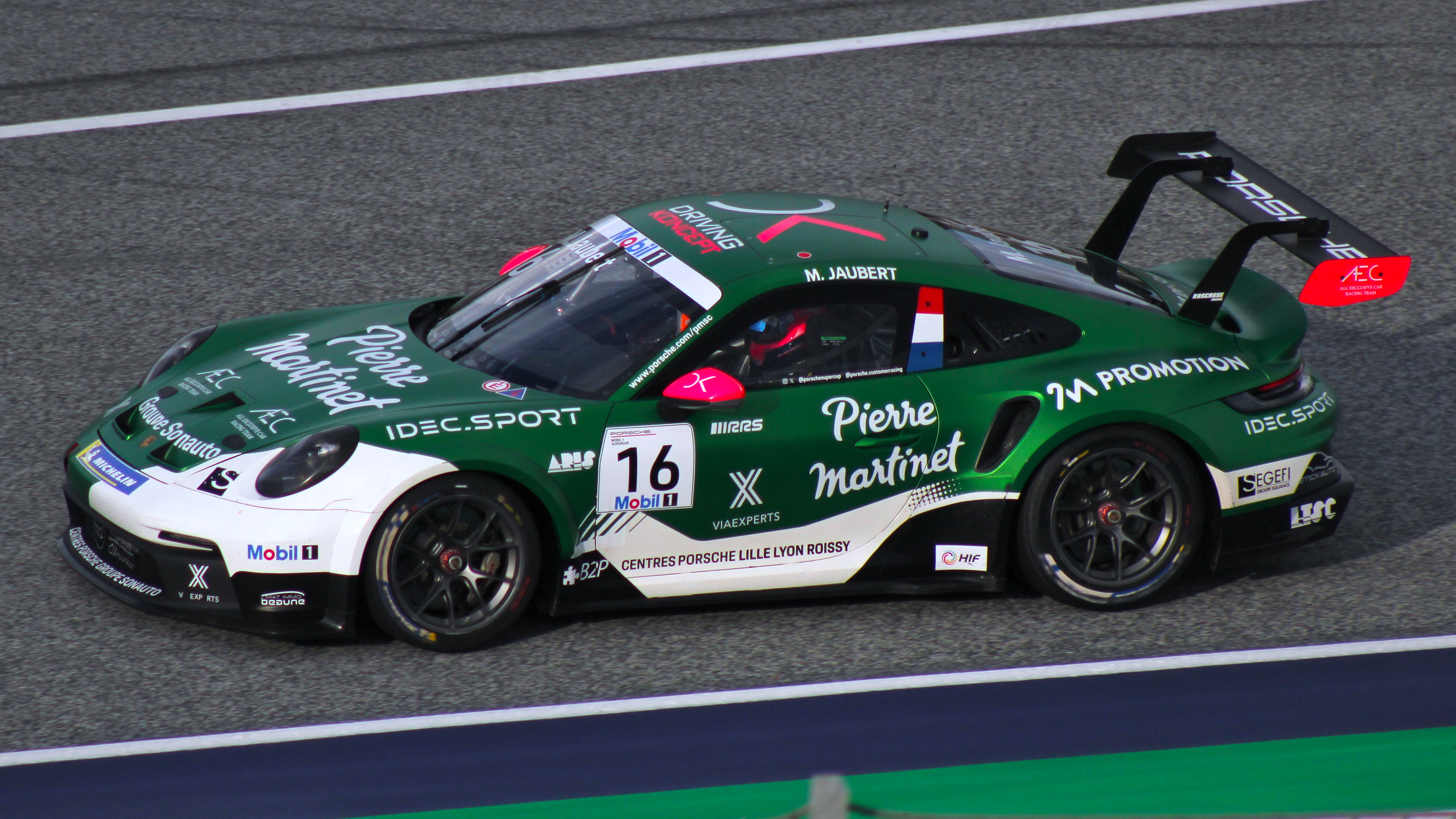
- Founded: 2008
- Founder(s): Philippe Alméras; Jean-Pierre Champeau
- Base: Montpellier, Hérault, France
- Current series: Porsche Supercup; Porsche Carrera Cup France; Ultimate Cup Series
- Former series: FFSA GT Championship; International GT Open; GT World Challenge Europe; European Le Mans Series; V de V Sports
- Teams' Championships: Porsche Carrera Cup France: 2016, 2017, 2018, 2019
- Drivers' Championships: FFSA GT Championship: 2011, 2012; Porsche Carrera Cup France: 2014, 2016, 2017, 2018, 2019
- Website: http://www.pro-gt.com/

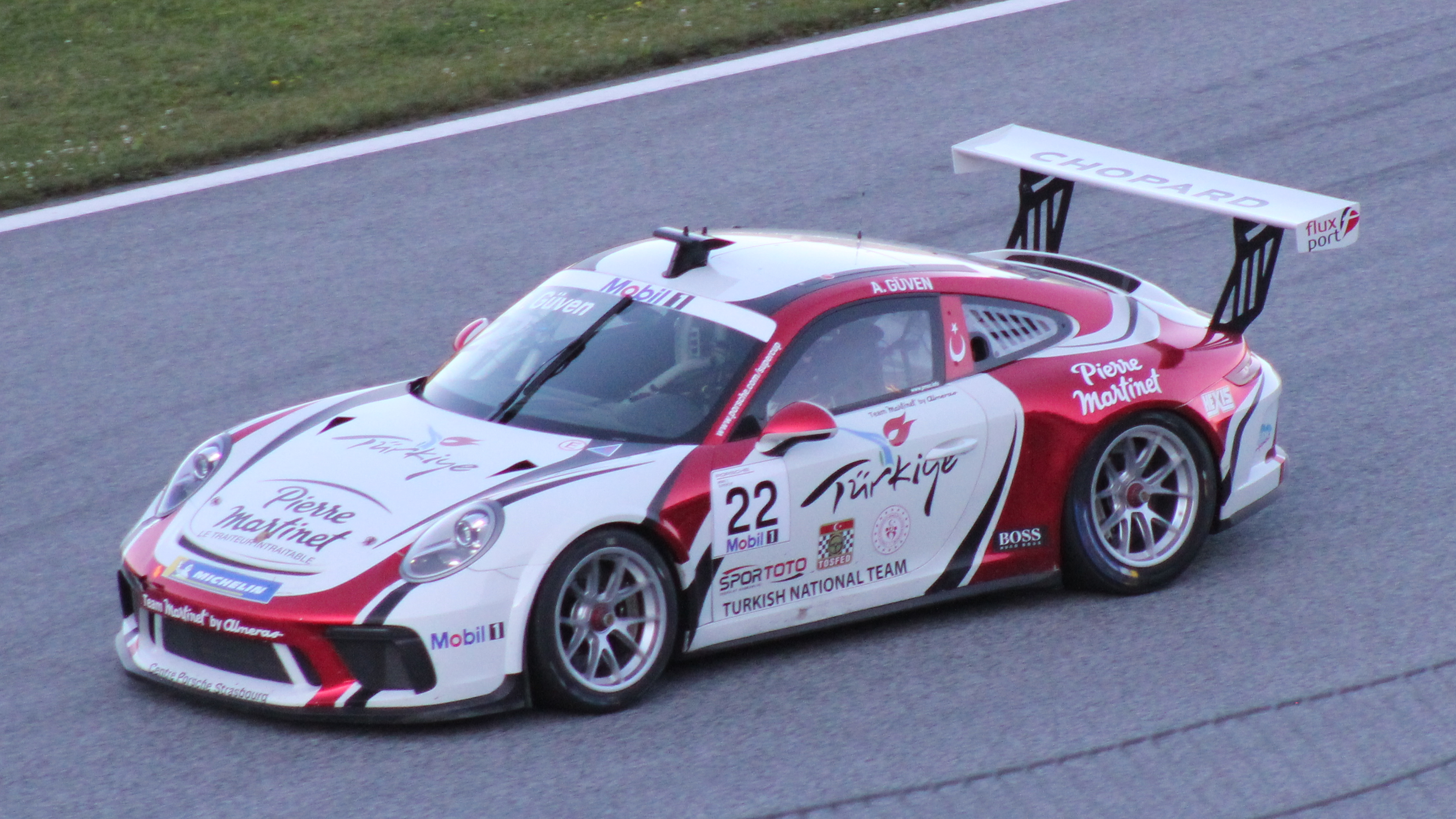
A Pro GT by Alméras Porsche 911 in the Porsche Supercup

After graduating through the Porsche Carrera Cup France and FFSA GT Championship, Philippe Alméras worked with Jean-Pierre Champeau in 2007 to launch Pro GT by Almeras for the 2008 season, extending the family team beyond his single entries to a variety of drivers in the Carrera Cup and GT Championship. Driver Henry Hassid earned three consecutive Category B championships in the Carrera Cup before Anthony Beltoise won two FFSA GT championships in 2011 and 2012, teamed with Laurent Pasquali then Hassid. The first entry in the international Porsche Supercup also comes in 2011. Pro GT's success earned them the support of the Porsche factory after they participate in the Blancpain Endurance Series for the first time in 2012, being assigned factory drivers for the Spa 24 Hours in 2013 and finishing in thirteenth place. The team rapidly expanded in 2014, adding the European Le Mans Series alongside their Blancpain campaign as well as a return for select events in the Porsche Supercup, while Côme Ledogar became the Carrera Cup France champion. Mathieu Jaminet repeated the French championship in 2016, followed by Julien Andlauer in 2017, and Ayhancan Güven in 2018 and 2019, while the teams title went to Pro GT in all four seasons. Pro GT became a full-time Supercup entrant in 2016, signing a sponsorship deal with caterer Pierre Martinet and rebranding the team as Martinet by Alméras.

Martinet by Alméras continues to participate in both the Porsche Supercup and Porsche Carrera Cup France in 2020.
