= 1974 European Formula Two Championship =

1974 European Formula Two season

Seasons
- ← 1973 1975 →

The 1974 European Formula Two season was contested over 10 rounds and had Frenchman Patrick Depailler as the season champion. Depailler, runner-up Hans-Joachim Stuck and some others also raced in 1974 Formula One season.

== Calendar ==
Race No	Circuit	Date	Laps	Distance	Time	Speed	Pole position	Fastest lap	Winner
1	(Spain) Barcelona	24 March	54	3.79=204.66 km	1'18:47.68	155.843 km/h	(West Germany) Hans-Joachim Stuck	(West Germany) Hans-Joachim Stuck	(West Germany) Hans-Joachim Stuck
2	(West Germany) Hockenheim	7 April	20+20	6.789=271.56 km	1'21:37.1	199.632 km/h	(West Germany) Hans-Joachim Stuck	(West Germany) Hans-Joachim Stuck	(West Germany) Hans-Joachim Stuck
3	(France) Pau	5 May	75	2.76=207.0 km	1'54:33.57	108.415 km/h	(France) Patrick Depailler	(France) Jacques Laffite	(France) Patrick Depailler
4	(Austria) Salzburgring	2 June	50	4.238=211.9 km	1'00:33.00	209.975 km/h	(United Kingdom) Tom Pryce	(France) José Dolhem	(France) Jacques Laffite
5	(West Germany) Hockenheim	9 June	20+15	6.789=237.615 km	1'11:43.9	198.753 km/h	(West Germany) Hans-Joachim Stuck	(France) Jean-Pierre Jabouille	(France) Jean-Pierre Jabouille
6	(Italy) Mugello	14 July	25+25	5.245=262.25 km	1'32:46.4	169.607 km/h	(France) Jacques Laffite	(France) Jean-Pierre Jabouille	(France) Patrick Depailler
7	(Sweden) Karlskoga	11 August	68	3.0=204.0 km	1'23:00.4; 1'23:00.7	147.458 km/h 147.449 km/h	(France) Patrick Depailler	(France) Patrick Depailler	(Sweden) Ronnie Peterson (France) Patrick Depailler
8	(Italy) Pergusa-Enna	25 August	30+30	4.808=288.48 km	1'24:31.9	204.761 km/h	(West Germany) Hans-Joachim Stuck	(West Germany) Hans-Joachim Stuck	(West Germany) Hans-Joachim Stuck
9	(West Germany) Hockenheim	28-29 September	20+20	6.789=271.56 km	1'23:26.4	195.273 km/h	(France) Jean-Pierre Jabouille	(France) Jean-Pierre Jabouille	(France) Patrick Depailler
10	(Italy) Vallelunga	13 October	35+35	3.2=224.0 km	1'22:48.59	162.300 km/h	(France) Patrick Depailler	(France) Patrick Depailler	(France) Patrick Depailler

Note:

Race 2, 5, 6, 8, 9 and 10 were held in two heats, with results shown in aggregate.

Race 5: the second heat was also originally scheduled over 20 laps, but stopped early due to heavy rain.

Race 7 was won by a graded driver shown in Italics

== Final point standings ==
=== Driver ===
For every race points were awarded: 9 points to the winner, 6 for runner-up, 4 for third place, 3 for fourth place, 2 for fifth place and 1 for sixth place. No additional points were awarded. The best 7 results count. No driver had a point deduction.

Place	Name	Team	Chassis	Engine	MNT (Spain)	HOC (West Germany)	PAU (France)	SAL (Austria)	HOC (West Germany)	MUG (Italy)	KAR (Sweden)	EMM (Italy)	HOC (West Germany)	VLL (Italy)	Total points
1	(France) Patrick Depailler	March Engineering	March	BMW	6	3	9	-	-	9	9	-	9	9	54
2	(West Germany) Hans-Joachim Stuck	March Engineering	March	BMW	9	9	-	-	4	-	-	9	6	6	43
3	(France) Jacques Laffite	BP Racing France	March	BMW	-	-	6	9	6	-	6	-	-	4	31
4	(France) Jean-Pierre Jabouille	Écurie Elf	Elf-Alpine	BMW	4	-	3	-	9	-	-	-	4	-	20
5	(United Kingdom) David Purley	Team Harper	March	BMW	-	-	1								13
5	(United Kingdom) David Purley	Team Harper	Chevron	Ford				6	-	-	-				13
5	(United Kingdom) David Purley	Team Harper	Chevron	BMW								6	-	-	13
6	(France) Michel Leclère	Équipe Elf	Elf-Alpine	BMW	1	4	2	-	2	-	-	3	-	-	12
7	(France) Patrick Tambay	Équipe Elf	Elf-Alpine	BMW	-	2	-	3	-	-	-	-	3	3	11
8	(Italy) Gabriele Serblin	Trivellato Racing	March	BMW	3	-	-	-	-	-	3	4	-	-	10
9	(United Kingdom) Tom Pryce	Team Baty	Chevron	Ford	-	-	-	-	3						9
9	(United Kingdom) Tom Pryce	Team Baty	Chevron	BMW						4	-	-	-	2	9
10	(United Kingdom) Andy Sutcliffe	Lewis Racing	March	BMW	2	-	4	-	1	-	-	-	-	-	7
11	(United Kingdom) John Watson	Surtees Racing	Surtees	Ford	-	6	-	-	-	-	-	-	-	-	6
	(France) Jean-Pierre Paoli	BP Racing France	March	BMW	-	-	-	-	-	6	-	-	-	-	6
13	(France) Jacques Coulon	March Engineering	March	BMW	-	-	-	-	-	3	-	-	2	-	5
14	(France) José Dolhem	Surtees Racing	Surtees	Ford	-	-	-	4	-	-	-	-	-	-	4
	(Japan) Masami Kuwashima	Kuwashima Racing	March	BMW	-	-	-	-	-	-	4	-	-	-	4
16	(Italy) Maurizio Flammini	Equipe Nationale	March	BMW	-	-	-	2	-	-	-	-	-	-	2
	(Italy) Giancarlo Martini	Trivellato Racing	March	BMW	-	-	-	-	-	2	-	-	-	-	2
	(France) Alain Cudini	Écurie Elf	Elf-Alpine	BMW	-	-	-	-	-	-	2	-	-	-	2
	(Sweden) Torsten Palm	Team Robert	GRD	BMW	-	-	-	1	-	-	1	-	-	-	2
	(Italy) Duilio Truffo	Equipe Nationale	March	BMW	-	-	-	-	-	-	-	2	-	-	2
	(Italy) Alessandro Pesenti-Rossi	Equipe Nationale	March	BMW	-	-	-	-	-	-	-	-	1	1	2
22	(Sweden) Bertil Roos	Opert Racing	Chevron	Ford	-	1	-	-	-	-	-	-	-	-	1
	(United Kingdom) Brian Henton	March Engineering	March	BMW	-	-	-	-	-	1	-	-	-	-	1
	(Italy) Cosimo Turizio	Trivellato Racing	March	BMW	-	-	-	-	-	-	-	1	-	-	1

Note:

Only drivers which were not graded were able to score points.

== Non-championship race results ==
Other Formula Two races, which did not count towards the European Championship, also held in 1974.

Race name	Circuit	Date	Winning driver	Constructor
(France) XXII Grand Prix de Rouen-les-Essarts	Rouen-Les-Essarts	30 June	(West Germany) Hans-Joachim Stuck	(United Kingdom) March-BMW
(France) XV Grand Prix de Nogaro	Nogaro	22 September	(France) Patrick Tambay	(France) Elf-BMW
