= Andy Sutcliffe =

British racing driver (1947–2015)

- Born: 9 May 1947; Mildenhall, Suffolk, England
- Died: 13 July 2015 (aged 68); Pluckley, Kent, England

Formula One World Championship career
- Nationality: (United Kingdom) British
- Active years: 1977
- Team: RAM
- Entries: 1 (0 starts)
- Championships: 0
- Wins: 0
- Podiums: 0
- Career points: 0
- Pole positions: 0
- Fastest laps: 0
- First entry: 1977 British Grand Prix

Andy Sutcliffe (9 May 1947 – 13 July 2015) was a British racing driver from England.

Born in Mildenhall, Suffolk, Sutcliffe began his racing career in 1969. He competed in Formula Three from 1970 to 1973, before contesting the 1974 European Formula Two Championship, finishing tenth overall in a BMW-powered March 732 entered by Brian Lewis. He was entered for that year's Formula One British Grand Prix at Brands Hatch, in a Brabham BT42 run by the Italian Scuderia Finotto team, but did not appear.

In 1977, Sutcliffe was again entered for the British Grand Prix, this time at Silverstone, in a March 761 run by the RAM Racing team. He failed to pre-qualify.

Sutcliffe later worked at a nursery in Ashford, Kent and lived in Pluckley in Kent.

== Racing record ==
=== Complete European Formula Two Championship results ===
(key) (Races in bold indicate pole position; races in italics indicate fastest lap)

Year	Entrant	Chassis	Engine	1	2	3	4	5	6	7	8	9	10	11	12	13	14	15	16	17	Pos	Pts
1973	STP March Engineering	March 732	BMW	MAL	HOC	THR	NÜR	PAU	KIN	NIV	HOC	ROU	MNZ	MAN	KAR; Ret	PER	SAL	NOR	ALB	VAL	NC	0
1974	Brian Lewis Racing	March 732	BMW	BAR; 5	HOC; 7	PAU; 3	SAL; Ret	HOC; 6	MUG; Ret	KAR	PER	HOC	VAL								10th	7

=== Complete Formula One results ===
(key)

Year	Entrant	Chassis	Engine	1	2	3	4	5	6	7	8	9	10	11	12	13	14	15	16	17	WDC	Points
1977	RAM Racing	March 761	Cosworth V8	ARG	BRA	RSA	USW	ESP	MON	BEL	SWE	FRA	GBR; DNPQ	GER	AUT	NED	ITA	USA	CAN	JPN	NC	0
