= March 732 =

March 732 March 73B
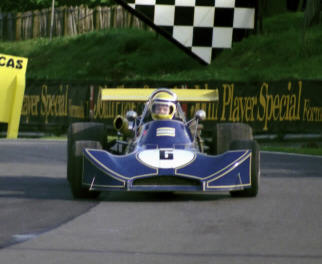
- Category: Formula 2 Formula Atlantic
- Constructor: March
- Predecessor: March 722
- Successor: March 742

Technical specifications
- Chassis: Aluminum monocoque with rear sub-frame covered in fiberglass body
- Suspension (front): Double wishbones, Coil springs over Dampers, Anti-roll bar
- Suspension (rear): Twin lower links, Single top links, twin trailing arms, Coil springs over Dampers, Anti-roll bar
- Axle track: 1,320 mm (52 in) (front); 1,300 mm (51 in) (rear)
- Wheelbase: 2,500 mm (98 in)
- Engine: BMW M12/7, mid-engined, longitudinally mounted, 2.0 L (122.0 cu in), I4, DOHC, NA; Hart 420R, mid-engined, longitudinally mounted, 2.0 L (122.0 cu in), I4, DOHC, NA; Ford-Cosworth BDA, mid-engined, longitudinally mounted, 1.6 L (97.6 cu in), I4, DOHC, NA; Ford-Cosworth BDG, mid-engined, longitudinally mounted, 2.0 L (122.0 cu in), I4, DOHC, NA
- Transmission: Hewland F.T.200 5-speed manual
- Power: 210–307 hp (157–229 kW)
- Weight: 502–510 kg (1,107–1,124 lb)
- Tyres: Goodyear

Competition history
- Notable drivers: (France) Jean-Pierre Jarier
- Debut: 1973
Wins	Podiums	Poles	F/Laps
8	9	4	4
- Drivers' Championships: 1973

The March 732 was a British open-wheel Formula 2 racing car, built by March Engineering and introduced in 1973. It was powered by the 2 L (120 cu in) BMW M12/7 engine. Its Formula Atlantic equivalent, the March 73B, was based on the 732. Frenchman Jean-Pierre Jarier eventually won the 1973 European Formula Two Championship driving a March 732, finishing the season with 8 wins, 9 podium finishes, 4 pole positions, 4 fastest laps, and 78 points.
