= 1973 European Formula Two Championship =

Motor racing season

1973 European Formula Two season

Seasons
- ← 1972 1974 →

The 1973 European Formula Two Championship was a motor racing competition for Formula Two cars, contested over 17 rounds. STP March Racing Team driver Jean-Pierre Jarier clinched the championship title.

== Calendar ==
Race No	Circuit	Date	Laps	Distance	Time	Speed	Pole position	Fastest lap	Winner
1	(United Kingdom) Mallory Park	11 March	50+50	2.17=217.0 km	1'12:09.8	180.424 km/h	(France) Jean-Pierre Beltoise	(France) Jean-Pierre Jarier	(France) Jean-Pierre Jarier
2	(West Germany) Hockenheim	8 April	20+20	6.797=271.56 km	1'22:27.0	197.618 km/h	(West Germany) Jochen Mass	(France) Patrick Depailler	(France) Jean-Pierre Jarier
3	(United Kingdom) Thruxton	23 April	50	3.791=189.55 km	1'01:45.4; 1'02:00.2	184.158 km/h 183.425 km/h	(France) Patrick Depailler	(France) Jacques Coulon (Brazil) Carlos Pace (France) Jean-Pierre Jarier	(France) Henri Pescarolo (France) Bob Wollek
4	(West Germany) Nürburgring (Eifelrennen)	29 April	10	22.835=228.35 km	1'31:22.9; 1'31:40.5	149.932 km/h 149.452 km/h	(West Germany) Hans-Joachim Stuck	(United Kingdom) Derek Bell	(Sweden) Reine Wisell (France) Patrick Depailler
5	(France) Pau	5-6 May	70	2.76=193.2 km	1'30:49.77; 1'31:14.44	127.624 km/h 127.049 km/h	(France) Jean-Pierre Jarier	(France) Jean-Pierre Beltoise	(France) François Cevert (France) Jean-Pierre Jarier
6	(Sweden) Kinnekulle	19-20 May	48+48	2.07=202.86 km	1'20:45.3	150.723 km/h	(West Germany) Jochen Mass	(West Germany) Jochen Mass	(West Germany) Jochen Mass
7	(Belgium) Nivelles	10 June	28+28	3.724=208.544 km	1'10:33.35	177.344 km/h	(France) Jean-Pierre Jarier	(West Germany) Jochen Mass	(France) Jean-Pierre Jarier
8	(West Germany) Hockenheim	17 June	20+20	6.797=271.56 km	1'22:20.7	197.870 km/h	(West Germany) Jochen Mass	(West Germany) Jochen Mass	(West Germany) Jochen Mass
9	(France) Rouen	24 June	30	5.543=166.29 km	0'56:20.7	177.077 km/h	(France) Jean-Pierre Jarier	(France) Jean-Pierre Jarier	(France) Jean-Pierre Jarier
10	(Italy) Monza	29 June	20+20	5.75=230.0 km	1'09:05.15	199.752 km/h	(United Kingdom) Roger Williamson	(United Kingdom) Roger Williamson	(United Kingdom) Roger Williamson
11	(Sweden) Mantorp Park	July 28/29	36+36	4.092=294.624 km	1'42:05.0	173.167 km/h	(United Kingdom) John Watson	(France) Patrick Depailler	(France) Jean-Pierre Jarier
12	(Sweden) Karlskoga	12 August	48	3.0=144.0 km	0'59:14.4	145.847 km/h	(United Kingdom) Peter Gethin	(Sweden) Torsten Palm	(France) Jean-Pierre Jarier
13	(Italy) Pergusa-Enna	26 August	30+30	4.797=287.82 km	1'23:53.6	205.847 km/h	(France) Jean-Pierre Jarier	(France) Patrick Depailler	(France) Jean-Pierre Jarier
14	(Austria) Salzburgring	2 September	50	4.238=211.90 km	0'59:47.28	212.651 km/h	(France) Patrick Depailler	(France) Patrick Depailler	(Italy) Vittorio Brambilla
15	(West Germany) Norisring	9 September	60+60	2.3=276.0 km	1'46:40.9; 1'47:40.9	161.642 km/h 155.228 km/h	(France) Jean-Pierre Jarier	(France) Jean-Pierre Jarier	(Australia) Tim Schenken (United Kingdom) Tom Pryce
16	(France) Albi	19 September	56	3.636=203.616 km	1'04:59.2	187.992 km/h	(Italy) Vittorio Brambilla	(France) Jean-Pierre Beltoise	(Italy) Vittorio Brambilla
17	(Italy) Vallelunga	14 October	35+35	3.2=224.0 km	1'24:40.0	158.740 km/h	(Italy) Vittorio Brambilla	(Italy) Vittorio Brambilla	(France) Jacques Coulon

Note:

Race 1, 2, 6, 7, 8, 10, 11, 13, 15 and 17 were held in two heats, with results shown in aggregate.

Race 3, 5, 9 and 12 were held with two semi-final heats and the final run, with time only shown for the final.

Race 3, 4, 5 and 15 were won by graded drivers, all graded drivers are shown in Italics

Race 9 Gerry Birrell was fatally injured in practice.

== Final point standings ==
=== Driver ===
For every race points were awarded: 9 points to the winner, 6 for runner-up, 4 for third place, 3 for fourth place, 2 for fifth place and 1 for sixth place. No additional points were awarded. All scores from basic events counts: Race No. 2, 3, 4, 7, 9, 11, 13, 16 and 17. Also the first four starts (not scores) in the complementary races counts: Race No. 1, 5, 6, 8, 10, 12, 14 and 15. But only the first result in any country of the complementary races counts. Three drivers had a point deduction, which are given in ().It was actually a very complicated scoring system and, for this reason, there are some differences in the scoring, depending on the consulate source, mainly regarding Jochen Mass (42 or 41 points), and Jacques Coulon (24 or 32 points).

Place	Name	Team	Chassis	Engine	MAL (United Kingdom)	HOC (West Germany)	THR (United Kingdom)	NÜR (West Germany)	PAU (France)	KIN (Sweden)	NIV (Belgium)	HOC (West Germany)	ROU (France)	MNZ (Italy)	MAN (Sweden)	KAR (Sweden)	EMM (Italy)	SAL (Austria)	NOR (West Germany)	ALB (France)	VLL (Italy)	Points
1	(France) Jean-Pierre Jarier	March Engineering	March	BMW	9	9	-	-	9	-	9	-	9	-	9	9	9	-	-	6	-	78
2	(West Germany) Jochen Mass	Surtees Racing	Surtees	Ford	-	-	-	-	-	9	6	9	6	-	6	-	4	-	-	2	-	42
3	(France) Patrick Depailler	Coombs Racing	Elf-Alpine	Ford	-	6	-	9	-	6	-	-	2	6	3	-	-	6	-	-	-	38
4	(Italy) Vittorio Brambilla	Beta Racing	March	Ford	2	-																35
4	(Italy) Vittorio Brambilla	Beta Racing	March	BMW			1	4	-	-	4	3	-	-	-	-	6	(9)	-	9	6	35
5	(France) Jacques Coulon	Scuderia Filipinetti	March	BMW	-	1	-	-	-	-	-	4	4	4	-							34
5	(France) Jacques Coulon	Lewis Racing	March	BMW												4	-	4	-	4	9	34
6	(France) Bob Wollek	Motul Rondel Racing	Motul	Ford	-	-	9	3	4	-	-	-	-	-	-	-	3	-	4	-	-	23
7	(United Kingdom) Mike Beuttler	Lewis Racing	March	BMW	-	-	6	-	6	-	3	-	-	-	-	-	-	-	-	-	-	15
8	(United Kingdom) Derek Bell	Surtees Racing	Surtees	Ford	-	4	-	6	-	-	-	-	-	3	-	-	-	-	-	-	-	13
	(United Kingdom) Colin Vandervell	Vandervell Racing	March	BMW	-	2																13
	(United Kingdom) Colin Vandervell	Lewis Racing	March	BMW			-	-	-	-	2	6	-	-	-	3	-	-	-	-	-	13
10	(United Kingdom) Roger Williamson	Wheatcroft Racing	GRD	Ford	-	-	-	-	2	-	-	-	-									11
10	(United Kingdom) Roger Williamson	Wheatcroft Racing	March	BMW										9	-	-	-	-	-	-	-	11
11	(United Kingdom) Dave Morgan	Team Reeves	Chevron	Ford	4	-	3	-	-	-	1	-	-	-	-	-	-	-	-	-	-	8
12	(Canada) Dave McConnell	DWM Racing	Surtees	Ford	6	-	-	-	-	-	-	-	-	-	-	-	-	-	-	-	-	6
	(Brazil) Wilson Fittipaldi	Motor Racing Developments	Brabham	Ford	-	3	-	-	-	-	-	-										6
	(Brazil) Wilson Fittipaldi	Motor Racing Developments	Brabham	BMW									3	-	-	-	-	-	-	-	-	6
	(France) Jean-Pierre Jaussaud	Motul Rondel Racing	Motul	Ford	-	-	2	-	3	-	-	-	-	-	1	-	-	-	-	-	-	6
	(Sweden) Torsten Palm	Surtees Racing	Surtees	Ford	-	-	-	-	-	-	-	-	-	-	-	6	-	-	-	-	-	6
	(Sweden) Gunnar Nilsson	Team Robert	GRD	Ford	-	-	-	-	-	-	-	-	-	-	-	-	-	-	6	-	-	6
17	(Sweden) Sten Gunnarsson	Team Robert	GRD	Ford	-	-	-	-	1	4	-	-	-	-	-	-	-	-	-	-	-	5
	(United States) Bill Gubelmann	private entry	March	BMW	-	-	-	-	-	-	-	-	-	-	-	(2)	2	3	-	-	-	5
	(West Germany) Roland Binder	private entry	March	BMW	-	-	-	-	-	-	-	-	-	-	-	-	-	2	-	-	3	5
20	(United Kingdom) Gerry Birrell	Chevron Racing	Chevron	Ford	-	-	4	-	-	-	-	-	-	-	-	-	-	-	-	-	-	4
	(Japan) Hiroshi Kazato	GRS International/Team Nippon	GRD	Ford	-	-	-	-	-	-	-	2	-	2	-	-	-	-	-	-	-	4
	(United Kingdom) John Watson	Team Arnold	Chevron	Ford	-	-	-	-	-	-	-	-	-	-	4	-	-	-	-	-	-	4
	(Switzerland) Jo Vonlanthen	Vonlanthen Racing	GRD	Ford	-	-	-	-	-	-	-	-	-	-	-	-	-	-	-	-	4	4
24	(United Kingdom) John Lepp	Chevron Racing	Chevron	Ford	3	-	-	-	-	-	-	-	-	-	-	-	-	-	-	-	-	3
	(Sweden) Håkan Dahlqvist	Team Robert	GRD	Ford	-	-	-	-	-	3	-	-	-	-	-	-	-	-	-	-	-	3
	(France) Jean-Pierre Jabouille	Coombs Racing	Elf-Alpine	Ford	-	-	-	-	-	-	-	-	-	-	-	-	-	-	-	3	-	3
	(Switzerland) Silvio Moser	private entry	Surtees	Ford	-	-	-	1	-	-	-	1	-	-	-	-	-	-	-	-		3
	(Switzerland) Silvio Moser	Lewis Racing Racing	March	BMW																	1	3
28	(United Kingdom) Richard Scott	private entry	Scott-Brabham	Ford	-	-	-	2	-	-	-	-	-	-	-	-	-	-	-	-	-	2
	(United Kingdom) Tom Pryce	Motul Rondel Racing	Motul	Ford	-	-	-	-	-	-	-	-	-	-	2	-	-	-	(9)	-	-	2
	(United States) Brett Lunger	Space Racing	Chevron	Ford	-	-	-	-	-	-	-	-	1	-	-	1	-	-	-	-	-	2
	(Italy) Spartaco Dini	Scuderia Nettuno	Brabham	Ford	-	-	-	-	-	-	-	-	-	-	-	-	-	-	-	-	2	2
32	(United Kingdom) Peter Salisbury	Team Gerard	Surtees	Ford	1	-	-	-	-	-	-	-	-	-	-	-	-	-	-	-	-	1
	(United Kingdom) Bob Marsland	private entry	Brabham	Ford	-	-	-	-	-	-	-	-	-	1	-	-	-	-	-	-	-	1
	(Italy) Gabriele Serblin	Team de Adamich	Brabham	Ford	-	-	-	-	-	-	-	-	-	-	-	-	1	-	-	-	-	1
	(Austria) Kurt Rieder	Lewis Racing	March	BMW	-	-	-	-	-	-	-	-	-	-	-	-	-	1	-	-	-	1
	(Sweden) Bertil Roos	DART Racing	GRD	Ford	-	-	-	-	-	-	-	-	-	-	-	-	-	-	-	1	-	1

Note:

Only drivers which were not graded were able to score points.

Race 6 and 15 not all points were awarded (not enough finishers).

Vittorio Brambilla had nine points deducted for his win at Austria, because this was his fifth start in a complementary race. He had also raced in race No. 1, 5, 8 and 10.

Bill Gubelmann had two points deducted for his fifth place at Karlskoga, because this was his second start in a complementary race in Sweden. He had also raced in race No. 6.

Tom Pryce had nine points deducted for his win at Norisring, because this was his second start in a complementary race in Germany. He had also raced in race No. 8.

== Non-championship race results ==
Other Formula Two races, which did not count towards the European Championship, also held in 1973.

Race name	Circuit	Date	Winning driver	Constructor
(Italy) I Coppa di Santamonica	Misano	22 July	(Brazil) Wilson Fittipaldi	(United Kingdom) Brabham-Ford
(Portugal) I Grande Prémio do Estoril	Estoril	21 October	(France) Jean-Pierre Jarier	(United Kingdom) March-BMW
