= Lionel Régal =

French hillclimbing racer

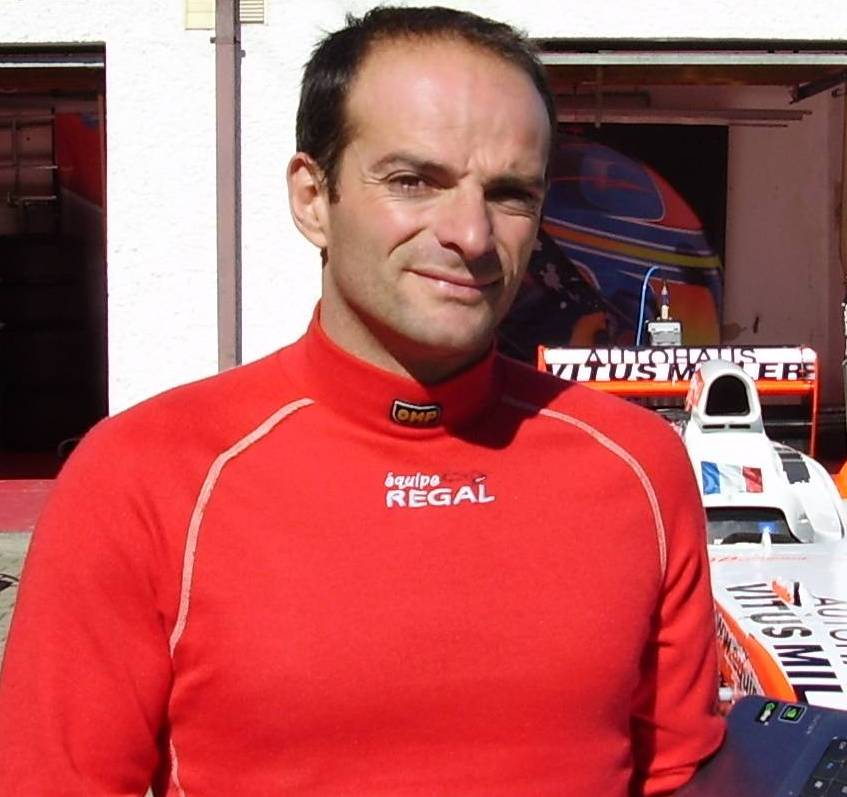
Lionel Régal in 2008

Lionel Bruno Régal (21 July 1975 – 15 August 2010) was a French hillclimbing racer.

After winning the French hillclimbing championship in 2005, 2006 and 2007, Régal won the French and European championships in 2008, becoming the first winner of both the national and international hillclimbing competitions. He again won the French championship in 2009.

Régal used to drive a Reynard/Mugen-Honda Formula Nippon.

Régal was born in Lentilly, France on 21 July 1975 and died crashing into a tree in Saint-Ursanne, Switzerland on 15 August 2010, aged 35.
