= Abarth 2000 Sport =

Abarth 2000
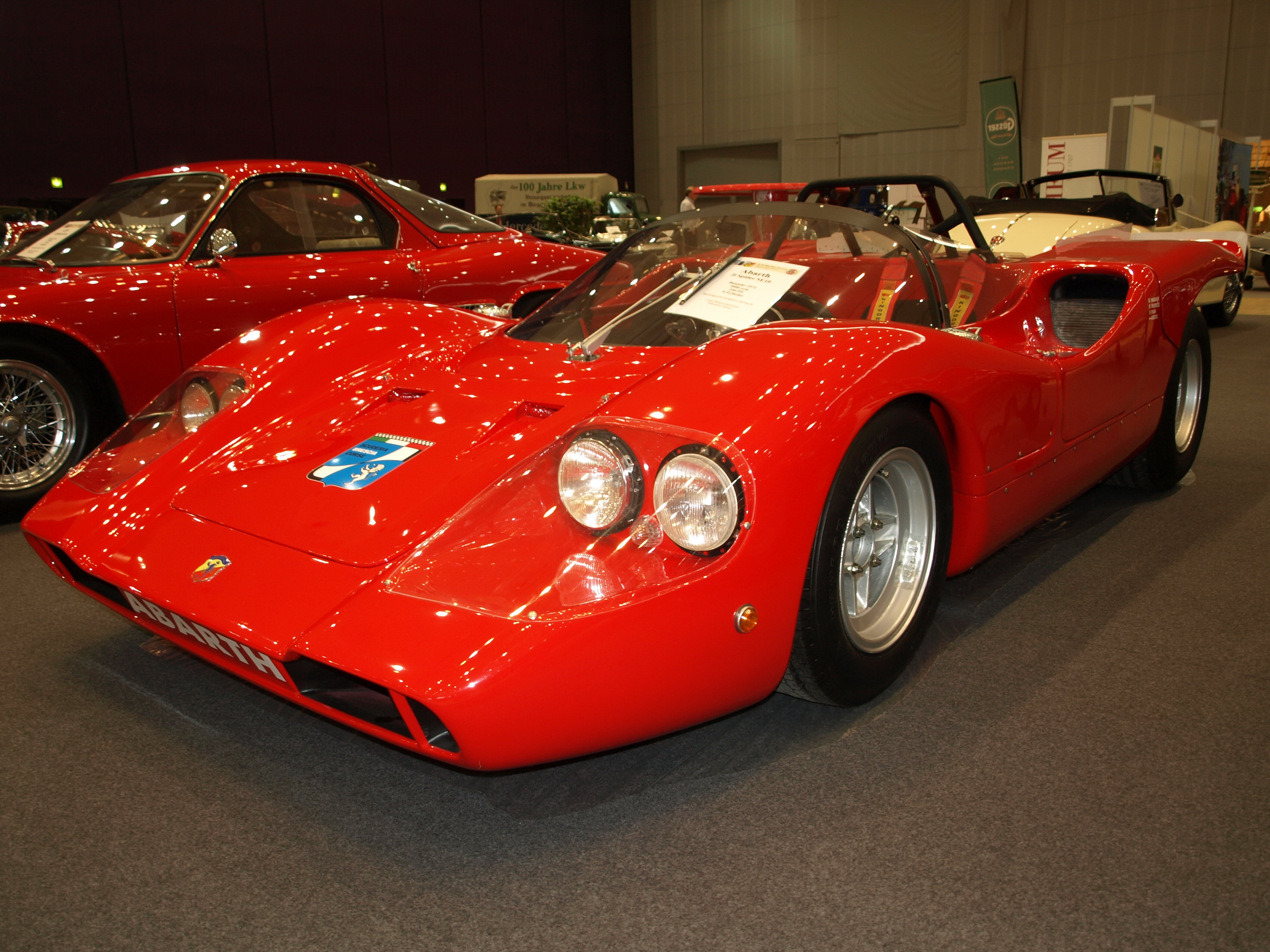

Overview
- Production: 1968-1969
- Designer: Abarth

Body and chassis
- Class: Group 4 Sports car
- Body style: 2-door cabriolet
- Layout: Rear-engine (SE010); Rear mid-engine (SE014/019)

Powertrain
- Engine: 1946 cc DOHC I4; 250 hp (184 kW)
- Transmission: 5-speed manual, rear wheel drive

Dimensions
- Wheelbase: 2,085 mm (82.1 in)
- Length: 3,850 mm (151.6 in)
- Width: 1,780 mm (70.1 in)
- Height: 970 mm (38.2 in)
- Curb weight: 575 kg (1,268 lb)

Abarth 2000 Sport (SE010) is a rear-engined racing car built by Italian car maker Abarth, which won its class at the 1000 km of Monza in 1971 and finished 11th overall. It was homologated for FIA Group 4 on 1 April 1969 with homologation number 252, and participated in a number of car races from 1969 to 1973. At least 50 cars were constructed, including the Sport SE mid-engine variant (SE014/019).

== 2000 Pininfarina Scorpione ==
The Abarth 2000 Pininfarina Scorpione is a rear-engined prototype sports car, designed by Italian design company Pininfarina, and developed and built by Abarth, in 1969. One prototype vehicle was built, and was displayed at the Brussels Motor Show in 1969.

== Popular culture ==
In the 1975 stop motion-animated film The Pinchcliffe Grand Prix, the racing car of Heinrich von Schnellfahrer is based on the Abarth 2000, upgraded with amongst others a larger rear wing and engine.
