= March 742 =

Formula 2 race car

March 742 March 74B
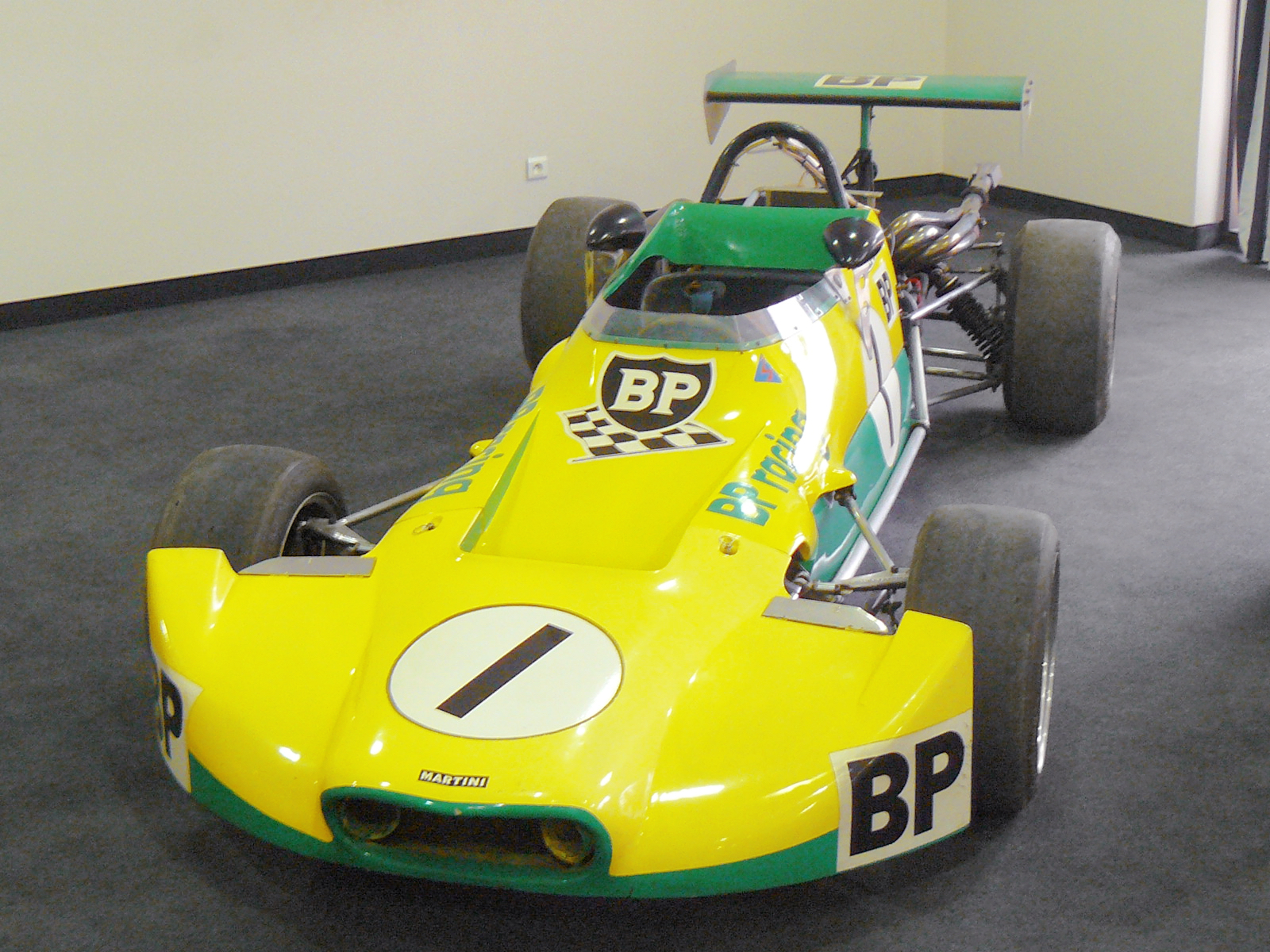
- Category: Formula 2 Formula Atlantic
- Constructor: March

Technical specifications
- Chassis: Aluminum monocoque with rear sub-frame covered in fiberglass body
- Suspension (front): Double wishbones, Coil springs over Dampers, Anti-roll bar
- Suspension (rear): Twin lower links, Single top links, twin trailing arms, Coil springs over Dampers, Anti-roll bar
- Axle track: 1,320 mm (52 in) (front); 1,300 mm (51 in) (rear)
- Wheelbase: 2,500 mm (98 in)
- Engine: BMW M12/7, mid-engined, longitudinally mounted, 2.0 L (122.0 cu in), I4, DOHC, NA; Ford-Cosworth BDA, mid-engined, longitudinally mounted, 1.6 L (97.6 cu in), I4, DOHC, NA; Ford-Cosworth BDG, mid-engined, longitudinally mounted, 2.0 L (122.0 cu in), I4, DOHC, NA
- Transmission: Hewland Mk.9/FT-200 5-speed manual
- Power: 215 hp (160 kW)
- Weight: 502–510 kg (1,107–1,124 lb)
- Tyres: Goodyear; BBS wheels

Competition history
- Debut: 1974

The March 742 is an open-wheel race car, designed, developed and built by British manufacturer March Engineering, and constructed to Formula Two regulations, and introduced for the 1974 championship. Its Formula Atlantic equivalent, used in the Atlantic Championship, known as the March 74B, was based on the 742.
