= March 722 =

- Category: Formula 2
- Constructor: March
- Predecessor: March 712
- Successor: March 732

Technical specifications
- Chassis: Aluminum monocoque with rear sub-frame covered in fiberglass body
- Suspension (front): Double wishbones, Coil springs over Dampers, Anti-roll bar
- Suspension (rear): Twin lower links, Single top links, twin trailing arms, Coil springs over Dampers, Anti-roll bar
- Axle track: 1,320 mm (52 in) (front); 1,300 mm (51 in) (rear)
- Wheelbase: 2,500 mm (98 in)
- Engine: Ford-Cosworth BDA, mid-engined, longitudinally mounted, 1.6 L (97.6 cu in), I4, DOHC, NA; Ford-Cosworth BDG, mid-engined, longitudinally mounted, 2.0 L (122.0 cu in), I4, DOHC, NA
- Transmission: Hewland F.T.200 5-speed manual
- Power: 220–276 hp (164–206 kW)
- Weight: 450–500 kg (990–1,100 lb)
- Tyres: Goodyear; Firestone

Competition history
- Debut: 1972

The March 722 was a British open-wheel formula race car chassis, designed, developed and built by March Engineering, for both Formula 2 and Formula B racing categories, in 1972.
