= Patrick Depailler =

French racing driver (1944–1980)

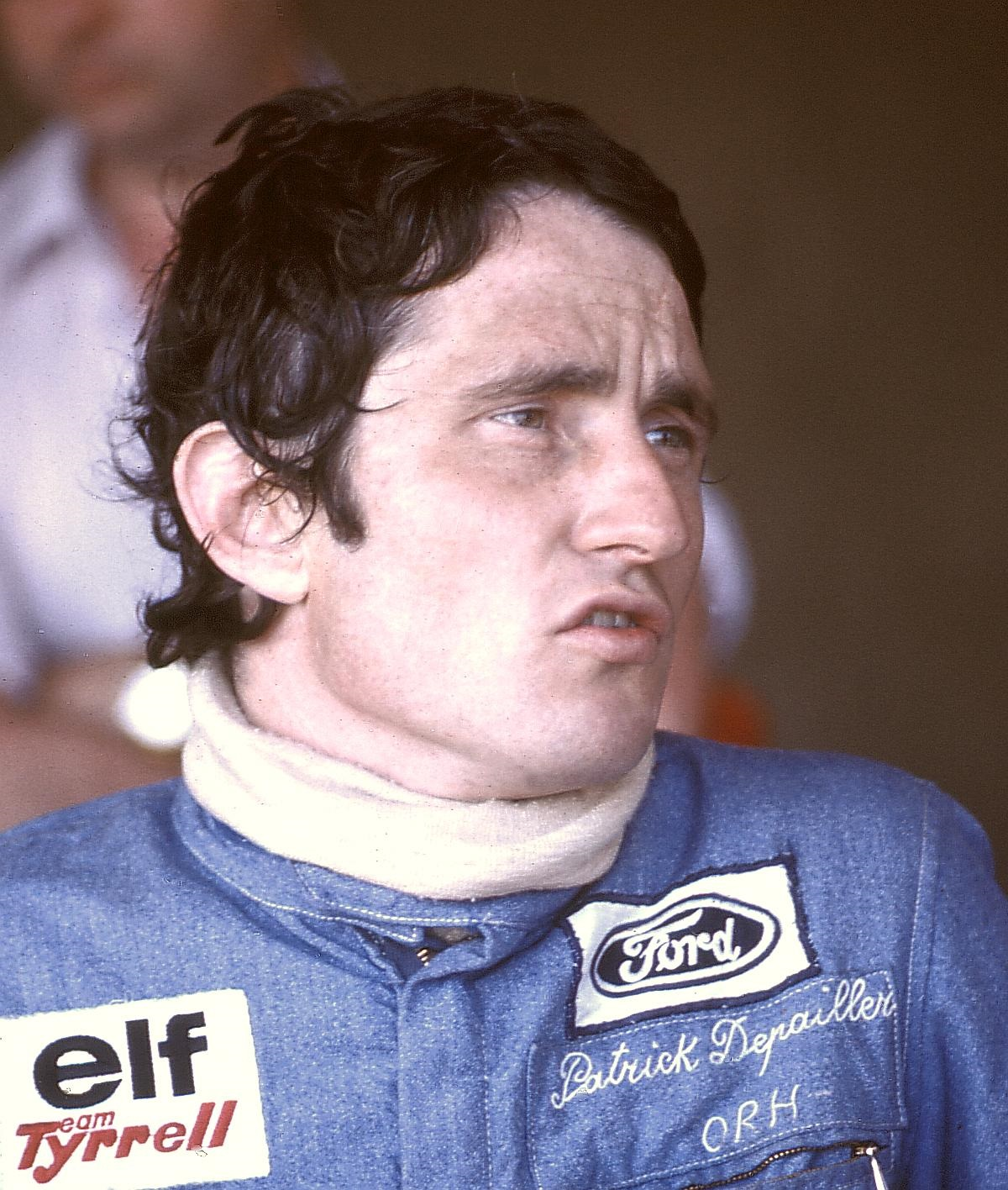
- Depailler in 1975
- Born: Patrick André Eugène Joseph Depailler; 9 August 1944; Clermont-Ferrand, Puy-de-Dôme, France
- Died: 1 August 1980 (aged 35); Hockenheimring, Baden-Württemberg, West Germany
- Cause of death: Injuries sustained while testing at Hockenheimring

Formula One World Championship career
- Nationality: (France) French
- Active years: 1972, 1974–1980
- Team(s): Tyrrell, Ligier, Alfa Romeo
- Entries: 95
- Championships: 0
- Wins: 2
- Podiums: 19
- Career points: 139 (141) (Note: Up until 1990, not all points scored by a driver contributed to their final World Championship tally (see list of points scoring systems for more information). Numbers without parentheses are Championship points; numbers in parentheses are total points scored.)
- Pole positions: 1
- Fastest laps: 4
- First entry: 1972 French Grand Prix
- First win: 1978 Monaco Grand Prix
- Last win: 1979 Spanish Grand Prix
- Last entry: 1980 British Grand Prix

Patrick André Eugène Joseph Depailler (French pronunciation: [patʁik ɑ̃dʁe øʒɛn ʒozɛf dəpaje]; 9 August 1944 – 1 August 1980) was a French racing driver, who competed in Formula One from 1972 to 1980. Depailler won two Formula One Grands Prix across eight seasons.

Depailler was born in Clermont-Ferrand, Puy-de-Dôme. As a child, he was inspired by Jean Behra. In Formula One, he joined a Tyrrell team that was beginning a long, slow decline, eventually moving to the erratic Ligier team before finally ending up with the revived Alfa Romeo squad in 1980.

In August 1980, Depailler was killed during a private testing session at the Hockenheimring. He achieved two wins, one pole position, four fastest laps and 19 podiums in Formula One. Depailler jointly holds the record for the most podiums before winning a Grand Prix (15).

== Sports cars and Formula Two ==
Depailler finished 0.9 seconds behind Peter Gethin in the 1972 Formula Two Pau Grand Prix. He battled Gethin closely in a March 722 over the 70-lap course which curved through the French city. Both drivers lapped the field twice. Depailler came in third in an April 1973 Formula Two race at the Nürburgring. He was driving a Ford Alpine. In May 1974, Depailler qualified his March in first position in qualifying for the Formula Two Pau Grand Prix. In June, he crashed his March 742 through a guard rail during time trials for a Formula Two race in Salzburgring. Depailler was uninjured but qualifying was stopped so that workmen could replace a section of railing which was torn off in the accident.

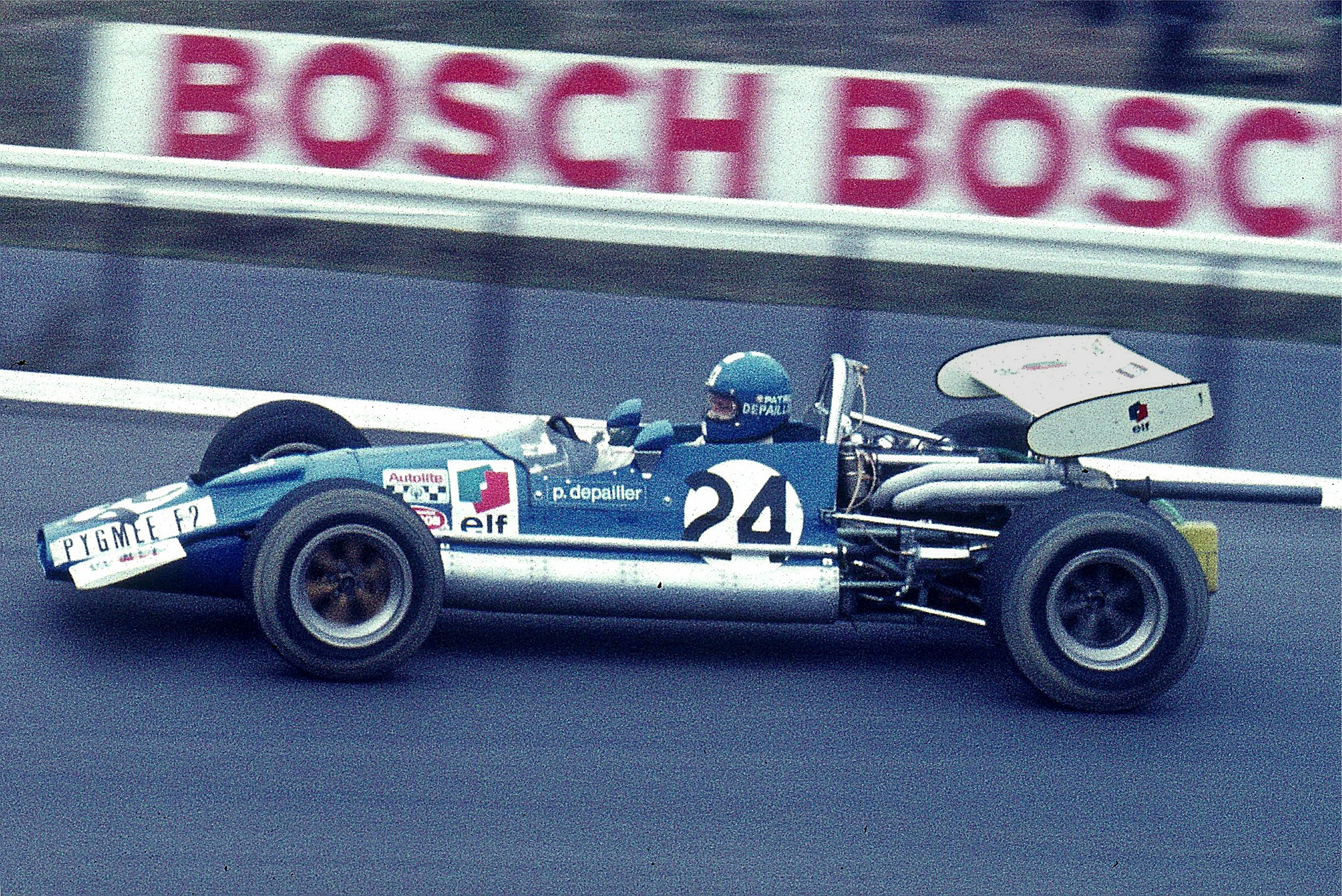
Depailler driving a Formula Two car at the Nürburgring in 1970.

In April 1976, the Renault sports car team suspended Depailler for three races after he was involved in a crash which knocked out both his car and the Renault of teammate Jean-Pierre Jabouille. The incident occurred on the second turn, slightly more than a mile after the beginning of a 180-mile (290 km) race at the Nürburgring. Depailler lost control and crashed, after which Jabouille also crashed while attempting to avoid his teammate. The drivers had been instructed not to contest the lead with each other. Depailler placed second in the 1976 Swedish Formula One Grand Prix. He was 19 seconds behind winner Jody Scheckter. Depailler drove in the International Race of Champions event at Riverside International Raceway in September 1978. He was behind the wheel of the Paul Newman entered Spyder-Chevy in the October 1978 California Grand Prix.

== Formula One ==
=== Tyrrell (1972–1978) ===
Tyrrell had given Depailler drives at France and Watkins Glen in 1972. Using one of the older cars, Depailler had finished in seventh place in the latter race. So in December 1973 Depailler was chosen with Scheckter to drive for Tyrrell, to replace the deceased François Cevert and retired Jackie Stewart. Depailler captured the pole for the 1974 Swedish Grand Prix, his ninth race as a Formula One driver. He negotiated the 2.49-mile (4.01 km) Anderstorp course in a time of 1 minute, 24.758 seconds, for an average speed of 105.8 miles per hour. Depailler would finish second in the race behind teammate Jody Scheckter; this proved his only podium of the year.

In January 1975, Depailler was given 25–1 odds of becoming the 1975 Formula One World Champion. He finished fifth in the 1975 Argentine Grand Prix in Buenos Aires. He took third at Kyalami in the 1975 South African Grand Prix. Depailler stayed behind second-place finisher, Carlos Reutemann, throughout the 78 laps of the event. On the first day of qualifying for the 1975 United States Grand Prix, Depailler crashed his Tyrrell into a catch fence at Watkins Glen. He was not injured.

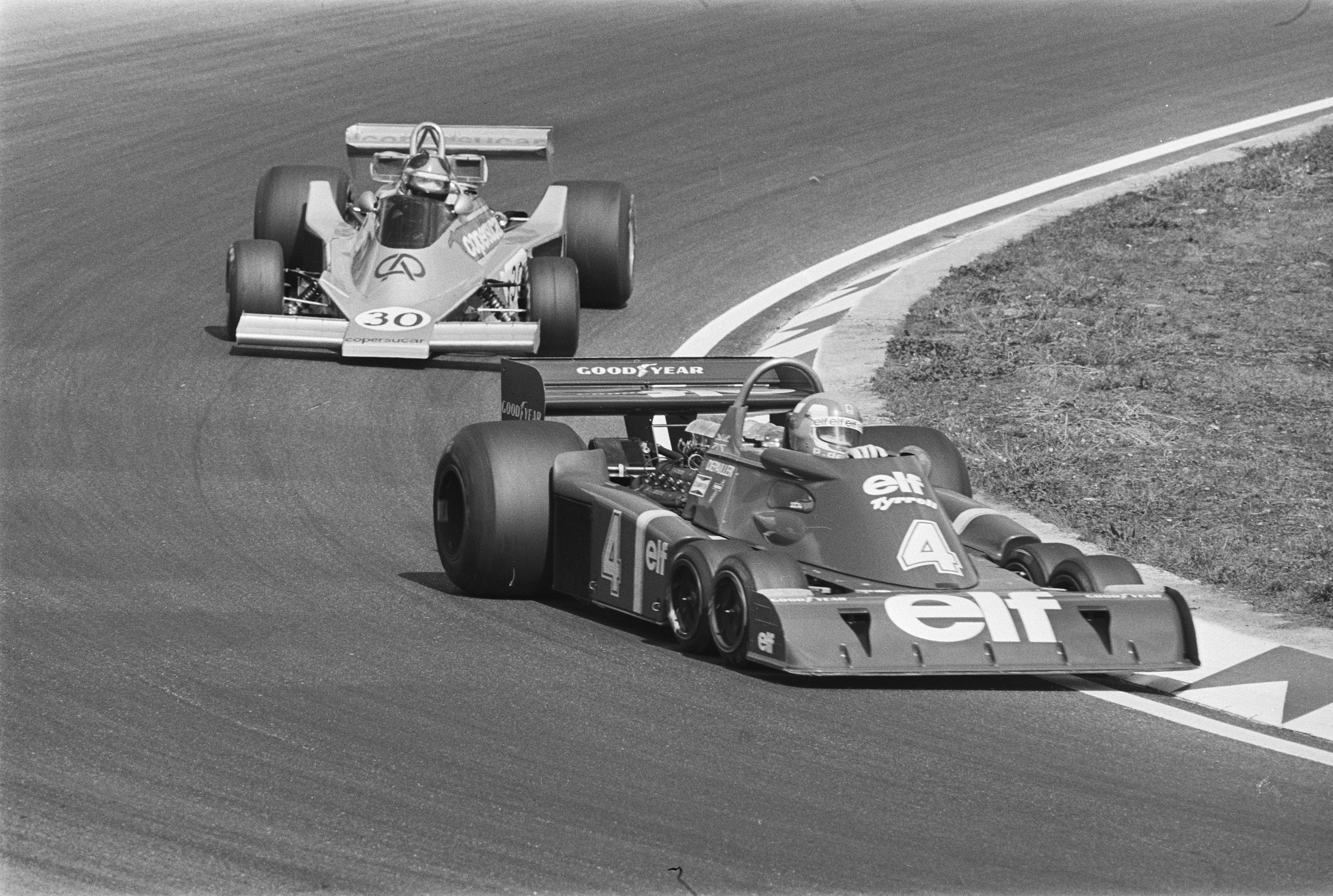
Depailler driving the Tyrrell P34 at the 1976 Dutch Grand Prix

Depailler came in second in the 1976 Brazilian Grand Prix at Interlagos. He ended up second to Clay Regazzoni on the second day of qualifying, with a speed of 87.31 mph (140.51 km/h). Depailler gained a third-place finish but drew the ire of rival James Hunt, who went out on the fourth lap. Hunt claimed that Depailler forced him off the track and shook his fist at him after his exit from the race. Depailler, who wrestled with brake trouble, claimed that he did not see the English driver in his mirrors. Depailler placed his six-wheeled Tyrrell in third position for the start of the 1976 Monaco Grand Prix. The Tyrrells of Scheckter and Depailler were the only cars able to stay on the same lap with Lauda's Ferrari, who won from pole position. Depailler was second to Hunt in the 1976 French Grand Prix at Le Castellet. Hunt held off a determined Depailler at Mosport Park in the 1976 Canadian Grand Prix. Both drivers were ill at the conclusion of the event, with Depailler having inhaled fumes over the last third of the race. He lost consciousness after pulling his car off at the first corner following the finish. He regained consciousness momentarily. Depailler finished second ahead of Hunt (who nevertheless secured the 1976 Drivers' Championship by finishing third) at the 1976 Japanese Grand Prix, despite encountering tyre problems as the Fuji Speedway track dried from heavy rains.

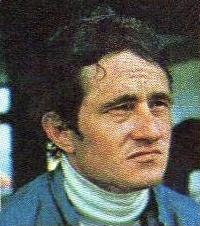
Depailler in 1977.

Depailler skidded off the Interlagos track at São Paulo during the 1977 Brazilian Grand Prix. He was hospitalized with a leg injury. Depailler qualified on the sixth row, 12th position, for the 1977 United States Grand Prix West. In December 1977, Depailler was promoted to the number one driver for Tyrrell, when Ronnie Peterson left to drive for Lotus. At the same time, Tyrrell revealed that it was quitting its experiment with six-wheeled Formula One cars.

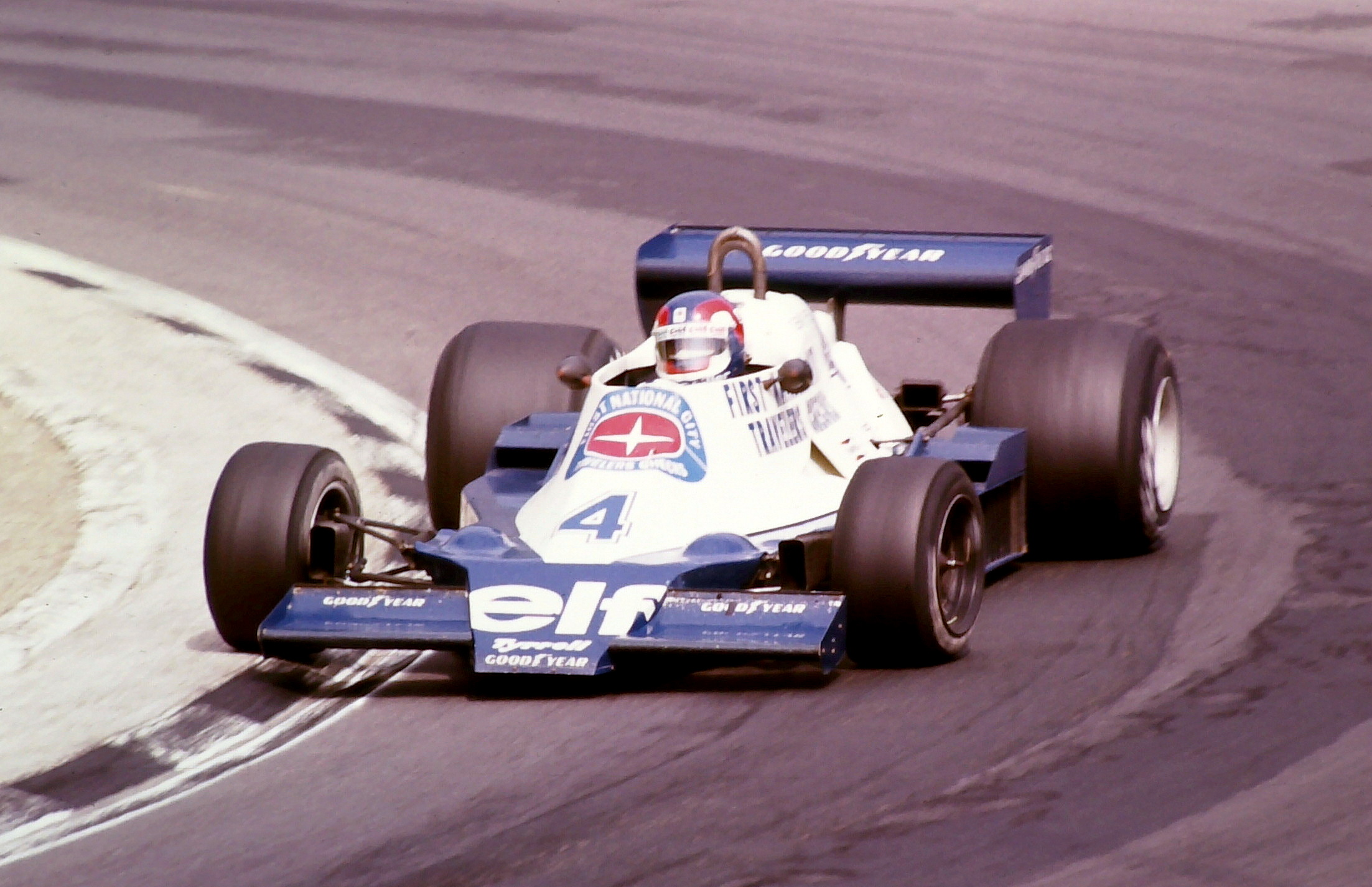
Depailler competing at the 1978 British Grand Prix

Depailler was third in the 1978 Argentine Grand Prix in an Elf-Tyrrell. Peterson passed Depailler on the last turn of the last lap at Kyalami, to claim the 1978 South African Grand Prix. Depailler's car was running short of fuel, allowing Peterson to erase a 9-second gap to win. Depailler climbed from 12th starting place to end in third position in the 1978 United States Grand Prix West. Depailler gained his first Formula One triumph by winning the 1978 Monaco Grand Prix. Piloting a Tyrrell-Ford 008, Depailler secured the 36th annual event. It was his first victory in 69 championship races, although he had been second eight times.

=== Ligier (1979) ===
Depailler switched to the Ligier team for 1979. The team began to field cars with V-8 Ford Cosworth engines, rather than the French-built Matra V-12 engines of 1978. Depailler led the first ten laps before his engine experienced problems in the 1979 Argentine Grand Prix. He was forced to make a pit stop but managed a fourth-place finish. Depailler came in second to his victorious teammate, Jacques Laffite, in the 1979 Brazilian Grand Prix. Laffite was more than five seconds ahead at the end of the race. Depailler made contact with the fence at "Barbecue Bend" in the 1979 South African Grand Prix.

Ligier team manager, Gerard Ducarouge, said that the Ligier JS-11 had been in the planning stages for some time. The JS-9 had been tested as a "wing car" following the 1978 United States Grand Prix West, but the wind tunnel tests proved unsatisfactory. The JS-11 was built and tested in December 1978, with positive results. The V-8 engine was lighter and the Cosworth exhaust system was modified so that it sounded much the same as the old Matra engine's distinctive whine. The new body features of the JS-11 were revealed at the 1979 United States Grand Prix West.

Depailler posted a flag-to-flag win at Jarama in the 1979 Spanish Grand Prix. The win enabled him to tie Gilles Villeneuve for the lead in the standings for the Formula One world championship at the end of April, with 20 points each. Depailler posted a third position in qualifying for the 1979 Monaco Grand Prix on a staggered grid. Depailler was replaced in June 1979 by Ligier, after breaking both legs in a hang gliding incident on 3 June near his hometown of Clermont-Ferrand. His heel was also critically injured. The race team was receiving financial support from the French government, which specified that his replacement also be French; his replacement was the French-speaking Belgian veteran Jacky Ickx.

Depailler had been healing well when he fell out of his hospital bed in early August, rebreaking one of the fractures. On 29 August, Depailler said that he was "resigned not to race again until next year", although he expected to leave his Paris hospital by the end of the week. He had undergone a number of operations on his legs, but had hopes to attend both autumn North American rounds, at Montreal and the Watkins Glen, as a spectator.

=== Alfa Romeo (1980) ===
In 1980, Depailler joined the newly formed Alfa Romeo team, that was on a comeback trail: Depailler had worked his way back from his hang-gliding accident the previous year, and had equipped his car with special brakes designed to toughen his leg muscles, he was still driving in pain by the time of his fatal accident and the car was fast (he qualified third for the 1980 United States Grand Prix West) but not reliable enough to finish.

== Death ==
Depailler suffered a fatal accident on 1 August 1980 whilst testing at Hockenheim ten days prior to the 1980 German Grand Prix when a suspension failure pitched his Alfa Romeo 179 into the Armco barrier at the high-speed Ostkurve, inflicting fatal head injuries when the vehicle overturned and vaulted the barrier. The car skidded along the top of the guard rail for several hundred feet prior to flipping onto its top.

== Legacy ==
A radio-controlled car racing circuit is named in honour of Depailler at his home town. The Mini Circuit Patrick Depailler is one of the oldest tracks in France and was used to host an International Federation of Model Auto Racing (IFMAR) meeting in 1999.

As a result of his fatal accident, a new chicane was built into the Ostkurve at the Hockenheim circuit in order to slow the cars down - previously it had been a flat out curving right hander. The new Ostkurve Schikane was first used during the 1982 German Grand Prix.

Depailler was portrayed by Xavier Laurent in the 2013 film Rush, directed by Ron Howard.

== Racing record ==
=== Career summary ===
Season	Series	Team	Races	Wins	Poles	F/Laps	Podiums	Points	Position
1967	24 Hours of Le Mans	Automobiles Alpine	1	0	0	0	0	N/A	DNF
1968	World Sportscar Championship	Automobiles Alpine	1	0	0	0	1	4	NC
1968	World Sportscar Championship	Ecurie Savin-Calberson	1	0	0	0	0	4	NC
1969	World Sportscar Championship	Automobiles Alpine	1	0	0	0	0	2	NC
1969	World Sportscar Championship	Ecurie Savin-Calberson	1	0	0	0	0	2	NC
1970	European Formula Two	Constructions Mécaniques Pygmée	1	0	0	0	0	N/A	NC
1970	24 Hours of Le Mans	Equipe Matra-Simca	1	0	0	0	0	N/A	DNF
1971	French Formula Three	Automobiles Alpine	?	?	?	?	?	?	**1st**
1971	European Formula Two	Equipe Tecno Elf	6	0	0	0	0	N/A	NC
1971	24 Hours of Le Mans	Equipe Matra-Simca	1	0	0	0	0	N/A	NC
1972	European Formula Two	Elf John Coombs	11	0	1	2	3	27	**3rd**
1972	Formula One	Elf Team Tyrrell	2	0	0	0	0	0	NC
1973	European Formula Two	Elf John Coombs	10	0	4	3	5	38	**3rd**
1973	24 Hours of Le Mans	Equipe Matra-Simca Shell	1	0	0	0	0	N/A	DNF
1974	Formula One	Elf Team Tyrrell	15	0	1	1	1	14	9th
1974	European Formula Two	March Racing Team	8	4	3	2	7	54	**1st**
1974	World Sportscar Championship	Automobiles Alpine	1	0	0	0	0	1	NC
1975	Formula One	Elf Team Tyrrell	14	0	0	1	1	12	9th
1975	World Sportscar Championship	Équipe Renault Elf	2	0	1	0	0	0	NC
1975	European Formula Two	Project 3 Racing	1	0	0	0	1	0	NC^{‡}
1976	Formula One	Elf Team Tyrrell	16	0	0	1	7	39	4th
1976	World Sportscar Championship	Équipe Renault Elf	4	0	3	0	1	30	NC
1977	Formula One	First National City Travelers Checks Elf Team Tyrrell	17	0	0	0	3	20	9th
1977	24 Hours of Le Mans	Équipe Renault Elf	1	0	0	0	0	N/A	DNF
1978	Formula One	First National City Travelers Checks Elf Team Tyrrell	16	1	0	0	5	34	5th
1978	24 Hours of Le Mans	Équipe Renault Elf Sport	1	0	0	0	0	N/A	DNF
1979	Formula One	Ligier Gitanes	7	1	0	1	2	20	6th
1980	Formula One	Marlboro Team Alfa Romeo	8	0	0	0	0	0	NC

^{‡} Graded drivers not eligible for European Formula Two Championship points

=== 24 Hours of Le Mans results ===
Year	Team	Co-Drivers	Car	Class	Laps	Pos.	Class Pos.
1967	(France) Société des Automobiles Alpine	(France) Gérard Larrousse	Alpine A210-Renault	P 1.15	204	DNF	DNF
1968	(France) Ecurie Savin-Calberson	(Belgium) Mauro Bianchi	Alpine A220-Renault	P 3.0	257	DNF	DNF
1969	(France) Société des Automobiles Alpine	(France) Jean-Pierre Jabouille	Alpine A220-Renault	P 3.0	209	DNF	DNF
1970	(France) Équipe Matra-Simca	(France) Jean-Pierre Jabouille	Matra-Simca MS650	P 3.0	70	DNF	DNF
1971	(France) Automobiles Ligier	(France) Guy Ligier	Ligier JS3-Ford Cosworth	P 3.0	270	NC	NC
1973	(France) Équipe Matra-Simca Shell	(France) Bob Wollek	Matra-Simca MS670B	S 3.0	84	DNF	DNF
1977	(France) Équipe Renault Elf	(France) Jacques Laffite	Renault Alpine A442	S +2.0	289	DNF	DNF
1978	(France) Équipe Renault Elf Sport	(France) Jean-Pierre Jabouille	Renault Alpine A443	S +2.0	279	DNF	DNF

=== Complete European Formula Two Championship results ===
(key) (Races in bold indicate pole position; races in italics indicate fastest lap)

Year	Entrant	Chassis	Engine	1	2	3	4	5	6	7	8	9	10	11	12	13	14	15	16	17	Pos.	Pts
1970	Constructions Mécaniques Pygmée	Pygmée MDB15	Ford	THR	HOC	BAR; DNQ	ROU; DNQ	PER; Ret	TUL	IMO	HOC										NC	0
1971	Equipe Tecno Elf	Tecno TF71	Ford	HOC; Ret	THR; Ret	NÜR; 21	JAR	PAL; Ret	ROU; DNQ	MAN	TUL; 9	ALB; Ret	VLL	VLL							NC	0
1972	Elf John Coombs	Alpine A367	Ford	MAL	THR	HOC; Ret			HOC; Ret												3rd	27
1972	Elf John Coombs	March 722	Ford				PAU; 2	PAL; 7		ROU; DNQ	ÖST; 5	IMO; Ret	MAN; Ret	PER; 2	SAL; 7	**ALB**; 2	HOC; Ret				3rd	27
1973	Elf John Coombs	Alpine A367	Ford	MAL	HOC; 2	**THR**; Ret	NÜR; 3	**PAU**; Ret	KIN; 2	NIV	HOC	ROU; 6	MNZ; 2	**MAN**; 4	KAR	PER; Ret	**SAL**; 2	NOR	ALB	VLL	3rd	38
1974	March Racing Team	March 742	BMW	BAR; 2	HOC; 4	**PAU**; 1	SAL; DNQ	HOC	MUG; 1	**KAR**; 2	PER; Ret	HOC; 1	**VLL**; 1								1st	54
1975	Project 3 Racing	March 752	BMW	EST	THR	HOC	NÜR	PAU; 3	HOC	SAL	ROU	MUG	PER	SIL	ZOL	NOG	VLL				NC	0^{‡}

^{‡} Graded drivers not eligible for European Formula Two Championship points

=== Complete Formula One World Championship results ===
(key) (Races in bold indicate pole position; results in italics indicate fastest lap)

Year	Entrant	Chassis	Engine	1	2	3	4	5	6	7	8	9	10	11	12	13	14	15	16	17	WDC	Pts
1972	Elf Team Tyrrell	Tyrrell 004	Ford Cosworth DFV 3.0 V8	ARG	RSA	ESP	MON	BEL	FRA; NC	GBR	GER	AUT	ITA	CAN	USA; 7						NC	0
1974	Elf Team Tyrrell	Tyrrell 005	Ford Cosworth DFV 3.0 V8	ARG; 6	BRA; 8	RSA; 4															9th	14
1974	Elf Team Tyrrell	Tyrrell 006	Ford Cosworth DFV 3.0 V8				ESP; 8		MON; 9			FRA; 8									9th	14
1974	Elf Team Tyrrell	Tyrrell 007	Ford Cosworth DFV 3.0 V8					BEL; Ret		**SWE**; 2	NED; 6		GBR; Ret	GER; Ret	AUT; Ret	ITA; 11	CAN; 5	USA; 6			9th	14
1975	Elf Team Tyrrell	Tyrrell 007	Ford Cosworth DFV 3.0 V8	ARG; 5	BRA; Ret	RSA; 3	ESP; Ret	MON; 5	BEL; 4	SWE; 12	NED; 9	FRA; 6	GBR; 9	GER; 9	AUT; 11	ITA; 7	USA; Ret				9th	12
1976	Elf Team Tyrrell	Tyrrell 007	Ford Cosworth DFV 3.0 V8	BRA; 2	RSA; 9	USW; 3															4th	39
1976	Elf Team Tyrrell	Tyrrell P34	Ford Cosworth DFV 3.0 V8				ESP; Ret	BEL; Ret	MON; 3	SWE; 2	FRA; 2	GBR; Ret	GER; Ret	AUT; Ret	NED; 7	ITA; 6	CAN; 2	USA; Ret	JPN; 2		4th	39
1977	First National City Travelers Checks Elf Team Tyrrell	Tyrrell P34B	Ford Cosworth DFV 3.0 V8	ARG; Ret	BRA; Ret	RSA; 3	USW; 4	ESP; Ret	MON; Ret	BEL; 8	SWE; 4	FRA; Ret	GBR; Ret	GER; Ret	AUT; 13	NED; Ret	ITA; Ret	USA; 14	CAN; 2	JPN; 3	9th	20
1978	First National City Travelers Checks Elf Team Tyrrell	Tyrrell 008	Ford Cosworth DFV 3.0 V8	ARG; 3	BRA; Ret	RSA; 2	USW; 3	MON; 1	BEL; Ret	ESP; Ret	SWE; Ret	FRA; Ret	GBR; 4	GER; Ret	AUT; 2	NED; Ret	ITA; 11	USA; Ret	CAN; 5		5th	34
1979	Ligier Gitanes	Ligier JS11	Ford Cosworth DFV 3.0 V8	ARG; 4	BRA; 2	RSA; Ret	USW; 5	ESP; 1	BEL; Ret	MON; 5	FRA	GBR	GER	AUT	NED	ITA	CAN	USA			6th	20 (22)
1980	Marlboro Team Alfa Romeo	Alfa Romeo 179	Alfa Romeo 1260 3.0 V12	ARG; Ret	BRA; Ret	RSA; NC	USW; Ret	BEL; Ret	MON; Ret	FRA; Ret	GBR; Ret	GER	AUT	NED	ITA	CAN	USA				NC	0

== Notes ==
Sporting positions
Preceded by Jean-Pierre Jaussaud	French Formula Three Championship; Champion; 1971	Succeeded by Michel Leclère
Preceded by David Walker	Monaco Formula Three; Race Winner; 1972	Succeeded by Jacques Laffite
Preceded by Jean-Pierre Jarier	European Formula Two Championship; Champion; 1974	Succeeded by Jacques Laffite
Preceded by Ronnie Peterson	Formula One fatal accidents 1 August 1980	Succeeded by Gilles Villeneuve
