= Buhrer =

Buhrer is a surname and may refer to:

- Dennis Bührer (born 1983), German football player and manager
- Gerold Bührer (born 1948), Swiss politician
- Jakob Bührer (1882–1975), Swiss journalist and writer
- Jamie Buhrer (born 1989), Australian rugby league player
- Marco Bührer (born 1979), Swiss ice hockey player
- Nicolas Bührer (born 1944), former car racing driver
- Stephen Buhrer (1825–1907), Democratic mayor of Cleveland from 1867 to 1870
- Thomas Bührer (born 1968), Swiss orienteering competitor
- Willy Bührer (1912–1990), Swiss athlete
