= TOJ SC303 =

Sports prototype race car

- Category: Group 6
- Constructor: Team Obermoser Jörg
- Designer(s): Jörg Obermoser

Technical specifications
- Chassis: fibreglass body on aluminium monocoque, front and rear subframes
- Suspension (front): double wishbones, coil springs over dampers, anti-roll bar
- Suspension (rear): single top links, twin lower links, twin trailing arms, coil springs over dampers, anti-roll bar
- Engine: Ford-Cosworth DFV 3.0 L (183 cu in) naturally-aspirated V8 mid-engined, longitudinally mounted
- Transmission: Hewland 5-speed manual
- Weight: 720–775 kg (1,587–1,709 lb)
- Tyres: Dunlop

Competition history
- Debut: 1977 Interserie Nürburgring

The TOJ SC303 is a sports prototype race car, designed, developed and built by German racing team and constructor, Team Obermoser Jörg; conforming to the FIA's Group 6 category and specification of motor racing, in 1978. It was unsuccessful Over its racing career, spanning only two races, it didn't manage to win any races, score any pole positions, or even a podium finish, and even failing to qualify for the prestigious 24 Hours of Le Mans that year. It was powered by a naturally-aspirated 3.0 L (180 cu in) Ford-Cosworth DFV V8 engine, producing 445 hp (332 kW). It was later replaced by its more successful successor, the SC304.
