= Alpine A441 =

Former French racing car prototype

Renault Alpine A441
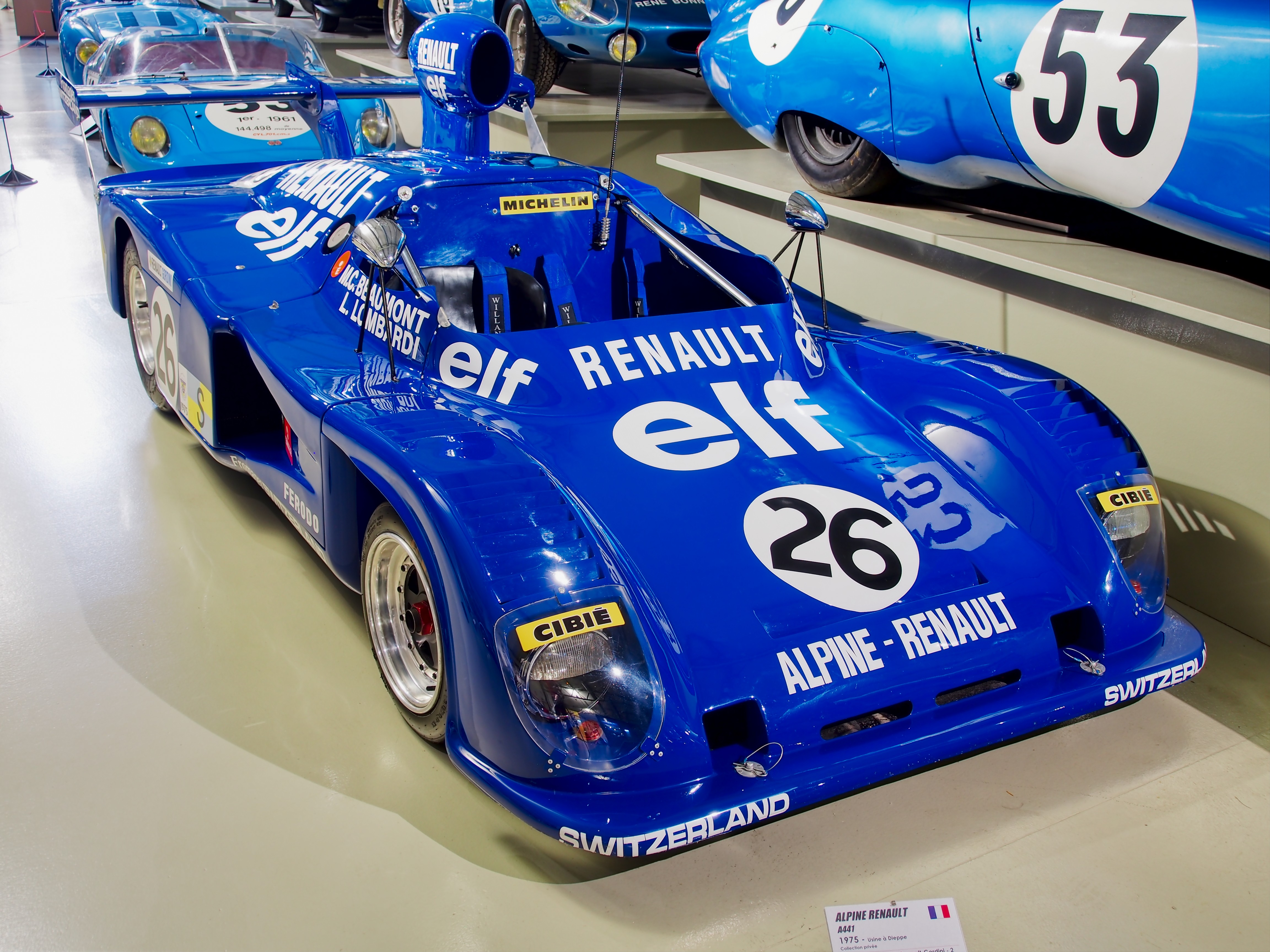
- 1975 Alpine-Renault A441.
- Category: Group 5 prototype (Sports 2000)
- Constructor: Alpine/Renault
- Designer: André de Cortanze
- Successor: Renault Alpine A442

Technical specifications
- Chassis: Aluminium-reinforced steel tubular spaceframe
- Suspension (front): Double wishbone
- Suspension (rear): Double wishbone
- Engine: Renault-Gordini 1997 cc 90° V6 turbo, mid-mounted
- Transmission: Hewland TL200 5-speed manual
- Fuel: Elf
- Tyres: Michelin

Competition history
- Notable entrants: Renault Sport
- Debut: 1974
Wins	F/Laps
7	3
- Constructors' Championships: 1

The Alpine A441 is a 2-liter (Sports 2000) Group 5 sports prototype racing car built by French company Alpine and co-developed by Renault to compete in the 1974 European 2 Liter Sports Car Championship. Designed by French engineer and racing driver André de Cortanze, the four A441s, entered as works cars and each driven by a French driver, won every race in the 1974 competition (at least one win by each driver), taking the Constructors' Championship, with driver Alain Serpaggi taking the Drivers' Championship.

== Racing history ==
In 1973, after having achieved much success in rally, Alpine decided to turn its attention and commitment to endurance racing, where despite having participated since 1963, it had not yet obtained significant results. Thus was conceived the Alpine A440 Barchetta, powered by a 2.0-liter 270 HP Renault- Gordini V6 engine, which immediately proved to be competitive.

An evolution of the A440 was prepared for the following season, equipped with a higher wheelbase, the Hewland FGA400 gearbox, and a lighter engine using magnesium and light alloys. The chassis was reinforced with aluminum sheets riveted to the tubular structure and the engine became partially load-bearing. At the same time, the suspension was revised to alleviate the understeer that the previous car suffered. Dubbed the A441, four prototypes were constructed and entrusted to some of the best racing drivers that France could offer at the time; including Gérard Larrousse, Jean-Pierre Jabouille, Alain Serpaggi and Alain Cudini. In their hands, Alpine-Renault won seven out of seven races and took the 1974 Marche continental title, while Alain Serpaggi's results earned him the European Drivers' Championship, in a 1-2-3 sweep ahead of his teammates Larrousse and Jabouille.

The following season the car was entrusted to private teams, while one example was equipped with a turbocharged engine by the American Garrett Systems to carry on the development of its heir, the A442. Among the results obtained by the private teams, there is the victory in the 2.0-liter class and the fourth place overall obtained at the 1000 km of Monza 1975 by the couple Marie-Claude Beaumont-Lella Lombardi.

== European Sportscar Championship results ==
- Round 1: The car took part in its first European Championship in the Switzerland Archambeaud team of Gérard Larrousse, as well as in the Alpine team, April 7, 1974, at the Paul Ricard circuit. Two drivers are competing in an Alpine A441: Alain Cudini who finishes in the first place, and Jean-Pierre Jabouille who finishes in 8th.
- Round 2: We see the car again on June 23, 1974, at the Trophée d'Auvergne which is held on the Charade circuit. Three Alpines compete, but only two are official. Their drivers are Gérard Larrousse on the unofficial car (winner), Alain Serpaggi, and Jean-Pierre Jabouille (retirement) on the official cars (factory cars).
- Round 3: July 21, 1974 - the third round is held at Misano in Italy. Two Alpines set the fastest lap in the race, the first being driven by Jean-Pierre Jabouille, ahead of the second driven by Alain Serpaggi.
- Round 4: Held on August 11, 1974, in Enna, Italy, there are three Alpine A441 that obtain prizes. The Swiss Archambeaud team with Gérard Larrousse as driver won the fastest lap in the race and the Alpine team followed with Jean-Pierre Jabouille as the driver. The Alpine team which again obtained third place with driver Alain Serpaggi.
- Round 5: On August 25, at Hockenheim, Alain Serpaggi took first place, Jean-Pierre Jabouille finished 8th, while Gérard Larrousse retired. The three are still driving Alpine A441s.
- Round 6: It takes place at the Mugello Circuit in Italy on September 22, 1974. Gérard Larrousse won first ahead of Alain Serpaggi, while Jean-Pierre Jabouille came fourth.
- Round 7: It takes place at the Jarama circuit, in Spain on, October 20, 1974. Jean-Pierre Jabouille comes first, followed by Gérard Larrousse; Alain Serpaggi gives up.

When the results of the championship were announced, the Alpine team took the title thanks to seven victories for the Alpine A441.

=== A441 Turbo ===
For the 1975 World Sportscar Championship, the team transforms the A441 model into the A441 Turbo (A441T) to take on the 3 liter class which also allows turbocharging when capacity is reduced by a 1.4 turbo factor to a maximum of 2.14 liter. Porsche had used such an flat-6 engine in the 1974 Carrera RSR turbo, and returned in 1976 with the Porsche 936 that won all races.

The difference with the previous model is the engine of the car: a 2-liter turbo engine developed by Bernard Dudot. The power of the motor then increased to 490 hp at 9,900 revolutions per minute (against 285 at 9,800).

The car is first sighted at the Mugello 1,000 km, on March 23, 1975. Jean-Pierre Jabouille and Gérard Larrousse drive this new model and finish on the top steps of the podium. A normal Alpine A441 was also part of the race in the Elf-Switzerland team; it is piloted by Marie-Claude Beaumont and Lella Lombardi who finished sixth.

The Renault Alpine team decides to put an end to the use of the Alpine A441 to develop the next A442 model. The model is then only used for testing. We find however the A441 during the races in the stable of Elf-Switzerland. It is found during notable races such as:

- 1000 km of Monza: April 20, 1975. The car comes in fourth behind the A442.
- 1,000 km of Spa: May 4, 1975 (the cars did not participate).
- 1000 km of the Nürburgring: June 1, 1975 (but only during testing).
- 1975 24 Hours of Le Mans; where the car was part of the Elf-Switzerland team.
- 1,000 km of Zeltweg: June 29, 1975, women's race, but the pilot on board the A441 abandons.

The Alpine A441 was retired at end of the 1975 season, to give way to its successor; the Renault Alpine A442.
