= 1976 World Sportscar Championship =

Racing tournament

1976 World Sportscar Championship season

Seasons
- ← 1975 1977 →

The 1976 World Sports Car Championship (officially the World Championship for Sports Cars,) was a motor racing series open to Group 6 cars, (officially Two-Seater Racing Cars (Group 6)). The championship was contested over a seven race series which ran from 4 April to 19 September and included a secondary award, the 1976 FIA Cup for Cars up to 2 Litres. 1976 was the 24th season of FIA World Sportscar Championship racing.

The championship was won by Porsche and the FIA Cup by Lola.

== Schedule ==
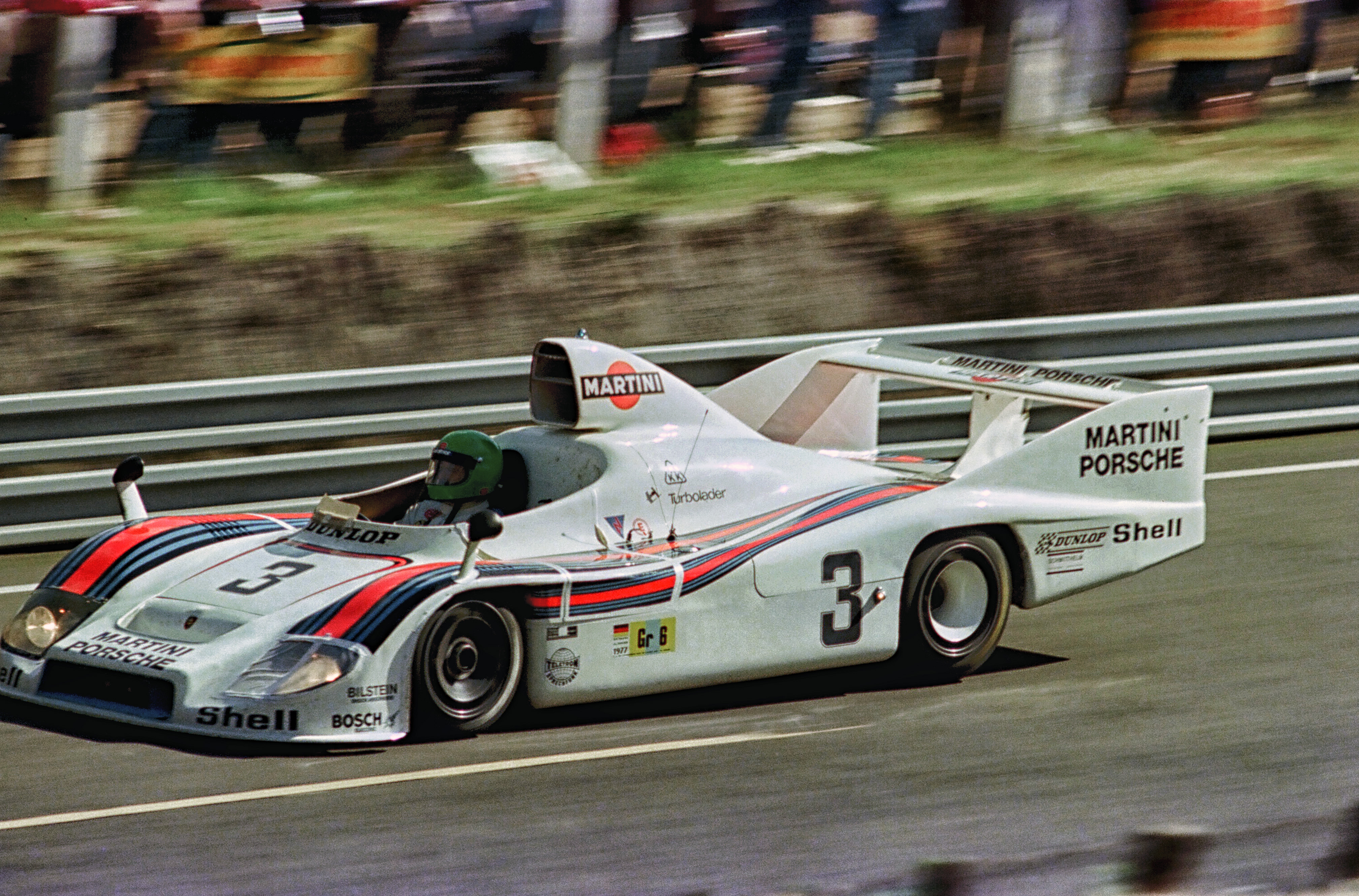
Porsche won the championship with its 908/3 and 936 models. A 936 in 1977 livery is pictured above.

Rnd	Race	Circuit	Date
1	(Germany) ADAC Nürburgring 300 km	Nürburgring	April 4
2	(Italy) Trofeo Filippo Caracciolo (4 Hours)	Autodromo Nazionale Monza	April 25
3	(Italy) Trofeo Ignazio Giunti (500 km)	Autodromo Dino Ferrari	May 23
4	(Italy) Coppa Florio (4 Hours)	Autodromo di Pergusa	June 27
5	(Canada) Player's 200	Mosport	August 22
6	(France) ACF 500 km of Dijon	Dijon-Prenois	September 5
7	(Austria) Elan Trophy (200 miles)	Salzburgring	September 19

== Season results ==
=== Races ===
Rnd	Circuit	Winning team	2-Litre Winning Team	Results
Rnd	Circuit	Winning drivers	2-Litre Winning drivers	Results
Rnd	Circuit	Winning car	2-Litre Winning Car	Results
1	Nürburgring	(Germany) #5 Joest Racing	(Germany) #40 Helmut Bross	Results
1	Nürburgring	(Germany) Reinhold Joest	(Germany) Helmut Bross	Results
1	Nürburgring	(Germany) Porsche 908/3	(United Kingdom) Lola T294-BMW	Results
2	Monza	(Germany) #3 Martini Racing	#22 Ateneo	Results
2	Monza	(Germany) Jochen Mass (Belgium) Jacky Ickx	(Italy) "Amphicar" (Italy) Armando Floridia	Results
2	Monza	(Germany) Porsche 936	(Italy) Osella PA4-BMW	Results
3	Imola	(Germany) #7 Martini Racing	#30 Torino Corse	Results
3	Imola	(Germany) Jochen Mass (Belgium) Jacky Ickx	(Italy) Roby Filannino (Italy) Ermanno Pettiti	Results
3	Imola	(Germany) Porsche 936	(Italy) Osella PA4-BMW	Results
4	Pergusa	(Germany) #4 Martini Racing	(Italy) #35 Roby Filannino	Results
4	Pergusa	(Germany) Jochen Mass (Germany) Rolf Stommelen	(Italy) Roby Filannino (Italy) Ermanno Pettiti	Results
4	Pergusa	(Germany) Porsche 936	(Italy) Osella PA4-BMW	Results
5	Mosport	(Germany) #20 Martini Racing	#47 Anthony R. Cicale	Results^{†}
5	Mosport	(Belgium) Jacky Ickx	(United States) Tony Cicale	Results^{†}
5	Mosport	(Germany) Porsche 936	(United Kingdom) Chevron B26-Hart	Results^{†}
6	Dijon	(Germany) #6 Martini Racing	#34 Racing Organisation Course	Results
6	Dijon	(Germany) Jochen Mass (Belgium) Jacky Ickx	(France) Jean-Louis Lafosse (France) Jean-Pierre Jaussaud	Results
6	Dijon	(Germany) Porsche 936	(United Kingdom) Chevron B36-ROC	Results
7	Salzburgring	(Germany) #3 Martini Racing		Results
7	Salzburgring	(Germany) Jochen Mass	(Austria) Dieter Quester	Results
7	Salzburgring	(Germany) Porsche 936	(Italy) Osella PA4-BMW	Results

† - In the race, Ickx finished behind two Group 7 CanAm cars, but these large capacity cars were not eligible for Group 6 championship points.

== Results - 1976 World Championship for Sports Cars ==
Points were awarded to the top ten finishers in each race in the order of 20-15-12-10-8-6-4-3-2-1. Manufacturers were only awarded points for their highest finishing car in each race with no points awarded for any additional placing gained.

Only the best 5 points finishes per manufacturer could be retained towards the championship, with any other points earned not included in the totals. Discarded points are shown within brackets in the table below.

Pos	Manufacturer	Rd 1	Rd 2	Rd 3	Rd 4	Rd 5	Rd 6	Rd 7	Total
1	(Germany) Porsche	20	20	20	20	20	(20)	(20)	100
2=	(France) Alpine		15		2	15	15		47
2=	(Italy) Osella		10	10	15			12	47
4	(United Kingdom) Lola	15	3	6		8	8		40
5	(United Kingdom) March	10	1	3	12	4			30
6	(United Kingdom) Chevron			1	4	10	4	4	23
7	(Italy) Alfa Romeo			15					15
8	(United Kingdom) Mirage					12			12
9=	(Germany) KMW	4	4						8
9=	(United Kingdom) McLaren	8							8
9=	(Switzerland) Sauber							8	8
12	(Italy) Abarth							6	6
13	(Switzerland) Cheetah						2		2

- The opening round at the Nürburgring was also contested by Group 4 GT cars which were not eligible for World Championship points.
- The fifth round at Mosport was also contested by Group 7 Can-Am cars which were not eligible for World Championship points.

=== The cars ===
The following cars contributed to the nett championship pointscores of their respective manufacturers:

- Porsche 908/4 & Porsche 936
- Alpine Renault A442
- Osella PA4 BMW
- Lola T292/4 BMW, Lola T292 Ford, Lola T292 T290/4 Ford & Lola T292 Hart & Lola T286 Ford
- March 75S BMW
- Chevron B36 ROC & Chevron B23 Ford & Chevron B26 Hart & Chevron B26 Ford
- Alfa Romeo 33TS12
- Mirage GR8 Ford
- KMW SP30 Porsche
- McLaren M8F Chevrolet
- Sauber SC5 BMW
- Abarth-Osella SE027 BMW
- Cheetah G601 BMW

== FIA Cup for Cars up to 2 Litres ==
The 1976 FIA Cup for Cars up to 2 Litres was contested concurrently with the 1976 World Championship for Sports Cars.

Position	Manufacturer	Nur	Mon	Imo	Ena	Mos	Dij	Sal	Total
1	(United Kingdom) Lola	20	10	12	-	15	20	-	77
2	(Italy) Osella	-	20	20	20	-	6	-	66
3	(United Kingdom) Chevron	-	-	6	8	20	15	12	61
4	(United Kingdom) March	15	8	8	15	-	-	-	46
5	(Switzerland) Sauber	-	-	-	-	-	-	20	20
6	(Italy) Abarth	-	-	-	-	-	-	15	15
7	(United States) Ford	12	-	-	-	-	-	-	12

== World Championship of Makes ==
For the 1976 season, the FIA chose to run two separate World Championships for "sportscars". Open-cockpit Group 6 cars would contest the new World Championship for Sports Cars, while production-based cars, including Group 5 Special Production Cars, would now contest the World Championship for Makes. The 1976 24 Hours of Le Mans, which was open to both types of cars, did not count towards either championship. The World Championship for Makes was won by Porsche.
