= 1976 24 Hours of Le Mans =

French automobile endurance race

Previous: 1975	Next: 1977
Index: Races | Winners

The 1976 24 Hours of Le Mans was the 44th Grand Prix of Endurance, and took place on 12 and 13 June 1976. This year the FIA introduced its new Group 5 and Group 6 regulations and the race was now open to nine distinct classes, although it was again not part of a World Championship. Porsche introduced its new models, the 936 in Group 6, the 935 in Group 5 and the 934 in Group 4. In response, BMW had its modified 3.0 CSL in Group 5. It was the year that turbos arrived in considerable numbers, with over a dozen turbocharged entries, led by the Renault Alpine A442. It saw the arrival of French prototype manufacturers Jean Rondeau and Gérard Welter in a new GTP class and a first-time invitation to American IMSA and NASCAR entries.

Once an initial challenge from Renault Alpine was seen off, the 936 of previous race-winners Jacky Ickx and Gijs van Lennep built a relentless, inexorable lead that was never headed. Even a 30-minute stop to repair a cracked exhaust on Sunday morning was not enough for the following pack and they won by a comfortable 11-lap margin. Second was the Mirage of French drivers François Migault and Jean-Louis Lafosse – the same car that had finished third the year before. Alain de Cadenet’s privateer effort showed far greater reliability this year and he achieved his best Le Mans result with third place.

The works Porsche 935 turbo of Rolf Stommelen and Manfred Schurti was fourth, easily winning the Group 5 class. After early issues, Henri Pescarolo and Jean-Pierre Beltoise bought their new Inaltéra home in 8th to take the inaugural GTP-class win. André Gahinet's privateer Porsche 911 was the unexpected winner in Group 4 when all the major teams, and their new Porsche 934s faltered. The race also saw the death of Frenchman André Haller when his Datsun 260Z crashed at speed at the Mulsanne Kink and caught fire.

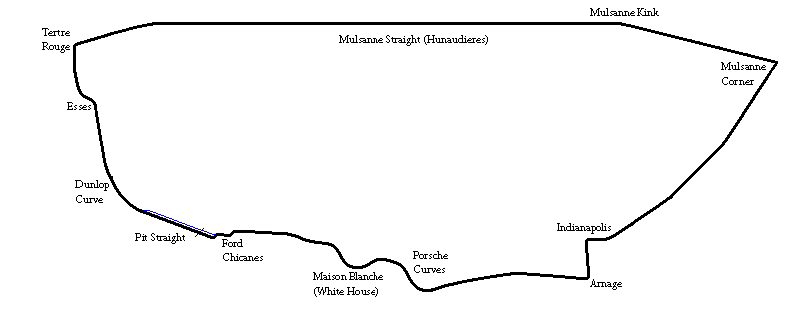
Le Mans in 1976

== Regulations ==
After a year's delay, the CSI (Commission Sportive Internationale - the FIA’s regulations body) issued its new regulation. The former Group 5 was renamed as Group 6. Engines permitted were either a standard production engine up to 5-litre capacity or racing engines up to 3-litres (or 2.1 litres if turbo-charged). The FIA revived the World Sportscar Championship for the Group 6 cars. The new Group 5 was for Special Production Cars. A silhouette formula that allowed considerable modification of a Group 2 or Group 4 car, with no minimum production required. The FIA used the separate World Championship of Makes (with more endurance races) for the new Group 5 with Group 4 and Group 2 cars, run separately but in parallel to the Group 6 cars. To encourage manufacturers to join in, the FIA also dropped the required production number of Group 4 cars from 500 to 400.

The Automobile Club de l'Ouest (ACO) saw the small fields in these events and decided it needed to open its entry to both categories in one race, against current FIA policy. The FIA promptly scheduled a championship race at the Circuit Paul Ricard on the same weekend which, unsurprisingly, then had to be cancelled for lack of entries. Ostracised by the FIA, the ACO instead developed closer bonds with the developing IMSA organisation in North America. A new Le Mans-Daytona Trophy was inaugurated linking the 24-hour sports-car races. The ACO opened its entry list to IMSA-category cars as well as NASCAR racers to encourage American participation.

For their own part, the ACO continued with its GTX non-homologated class – a counterpoint to Group 5. Significantly, this year it also introduced its new GTP (Grand Touring Prototype) class – a counterpart of Group 6. These cars were closed-topped cars at least 110 cm high, 850 kg minimum weight (heavier than Group 6) and without wings, nominally as prototypes for new GT designs. GTP was to become the forerunner of the Group C regulations used in the 1980s. All together there were now nine separate classes of entry.

The ACO's 1975 experiment with the fuel limitations was not repeated (although GTP cars had to use less than 25 litres of fuel per 100 km). Consequently, the freedom to replace and repair all parts was also rescinded. It was now not permitted to replace the engine block, cylinder heads, gearbox or differential within the course of the race. The ACO stated that all entries had to have been built from January 1, 1972. They also dictated that every driver had to do at least 1 lap with 125% of the fastest 3 laps done by drivers in their category.

Finally, there was no Index of Thermal Efficiency competition. Instead, this year the ACO offered £1000 prizemoney to the cars that covered the most laps within each 6-hour period.

== Entries ==
This year the ACO received 97 applications, of which 68 were accepted and 58 arrived for qualifying on race week. Significantly, it was the first Le Mans with no Ferrari entrants since that company's founding in 1947. Works teams from Porsche, BMW and Renault arrived. It was notable that with the times of limited finances, even major manufacturers only ran 1-2 car works teams. It did see an increase in the number of turbo-powered cars. With the 1.4x capacity equivalence, the power increase versus extra weight made them very attractive: 17 turbo cars arrived for race week.

Class	Large-engines >2.0L classes	Medium-engines < 2.0L classes
Group 6 S Sports 3-litre	10 / 9	9 / 8
Group 5 SP Special Production	16 / 16	0
Group 4 GTS Special GT	10 / 10	0
Group 2 TS Special Touring	1 / 1	0
GTP Le Mans GT Prototype	4 / 4	0
GTX Le Mans GT Experimental	2 / 1	0
IMSA GT	4 / 4	0
NASCAR Stock car	2 / 2	0
Total Entries	49 / 47	9 / 8

- Note: The first number is the number of arrivals, the second the number who started.

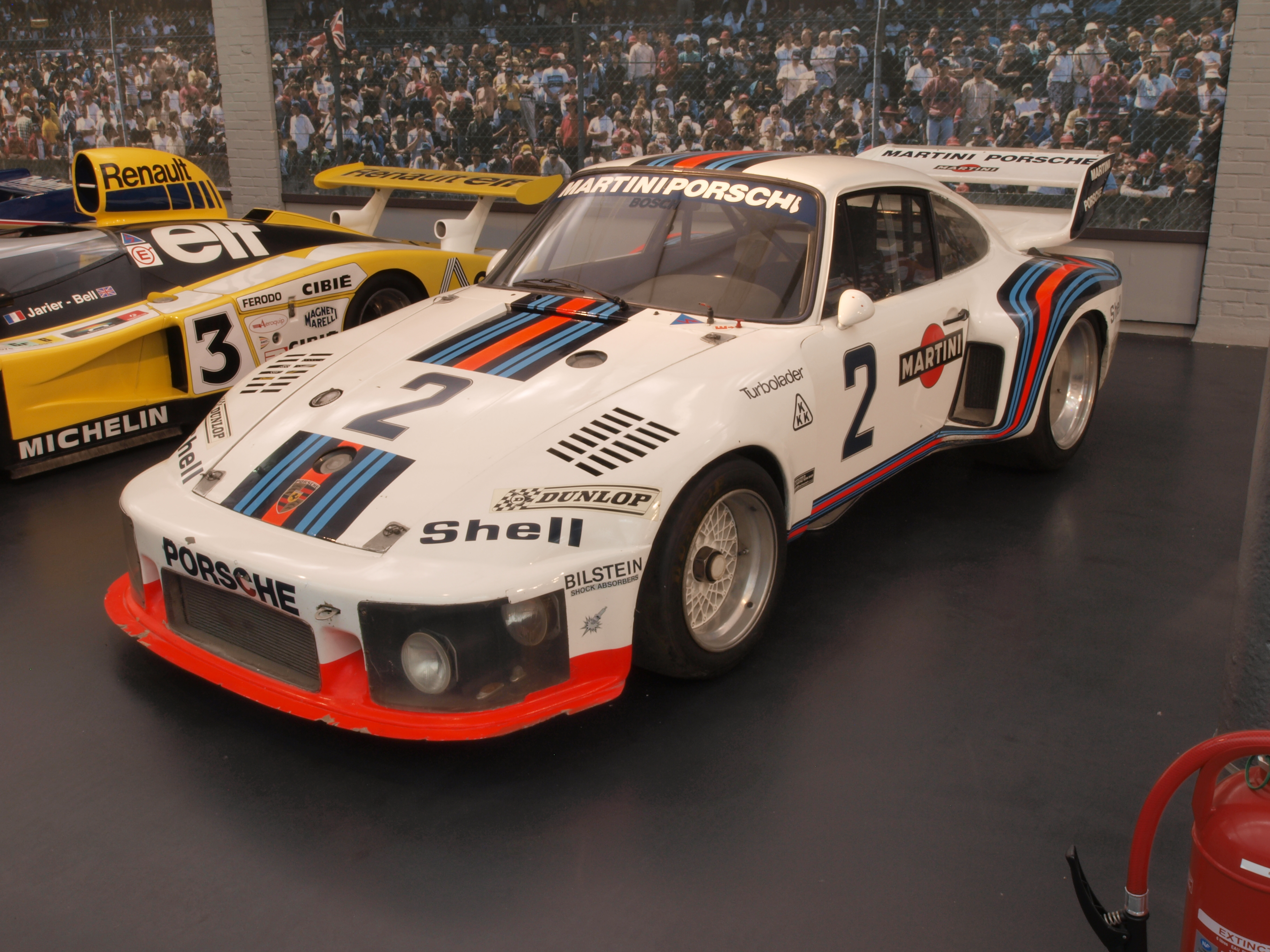
Porsche 935

The Porsche works team returned with two new designs for the new regulations. Norbert Singer had led the development of the Group 5 Porsche 935 from the 934 Turbo of 1974. The 2.85-litre flat-6 engine was augmented by a KKK (Kühnle, Kopp & Kausch) turbo, producing 590 bhp and capable of 335 kp/h (210 mph). The chassis only weighed 900 kg, well under the 970 kg minimum stipulated for a 4-litre car in the rules, allowing the compulsory ballast to then improve weight distribution. Regulations also permitted the lights to be recessed into the front spoiler further improving aerodynamics. For Le Mans, the works car was driven by Rolf Stommelen/Manfred Schurti.

The Porsche 936 was even newer – developed in only nine months. Group 6 cars were allowed 40 litres more fuel and to be more than 200 kg lighter. Its 2.1-litre flat-6 engine was also turbocharged and could produce 520 bhp and, when the turbo was wound up, could reach 320 kp/h (200 mph). Jacky Ickx and Jochen Mass had been doing double-duty running both the works 936 and 935 in alternate races of the World Championships, and were entered in the lead 936 for Le Mans. A second works car was prepared, taking over an entry of Joest Racing and driven by that team's regular drivers, Reinhold Joest himself with Jürgen Barth.

Renault-Alpine would be Porsche's main opposition in the shorter-format World Championship races. Gérard Larrousse had retired from racing at the end of 1975 and taken up the role of motorsport director at Renault. The company bought out the final share of Jean Rédélé at Alpine and renamed it Renault Sport. Over the winter the A442 had been developed and a longtail version was found to be best for Le Mans. With its Garrett turbo, it could produce 500 bhp and reach 335 kp/h (210 mph). As the race clashed with the Formula 1 Swedish GP, Larrousse had fewer driver options, so only one car was entered. This would be driven by Jean-Pierre Jabouille, José Dolhem and Patrick Tambay (in his first race out of a single-seater).

With John Wyer’s retirement, the Gulf-Mirage operation was taken over by American Harley Cluxton. With John Horsman still as technical director, the same two cars that had finished first and third in the previous year's race were entered again. Rebadged as Mirages again, they were driven respectively by Derek Bell/Vern Schuppan and former Ligier drivers François Migault and Jean-Louis Lafosse. Without the tight fuel restrictions of the previous year, they could run the cars back at higher revs.

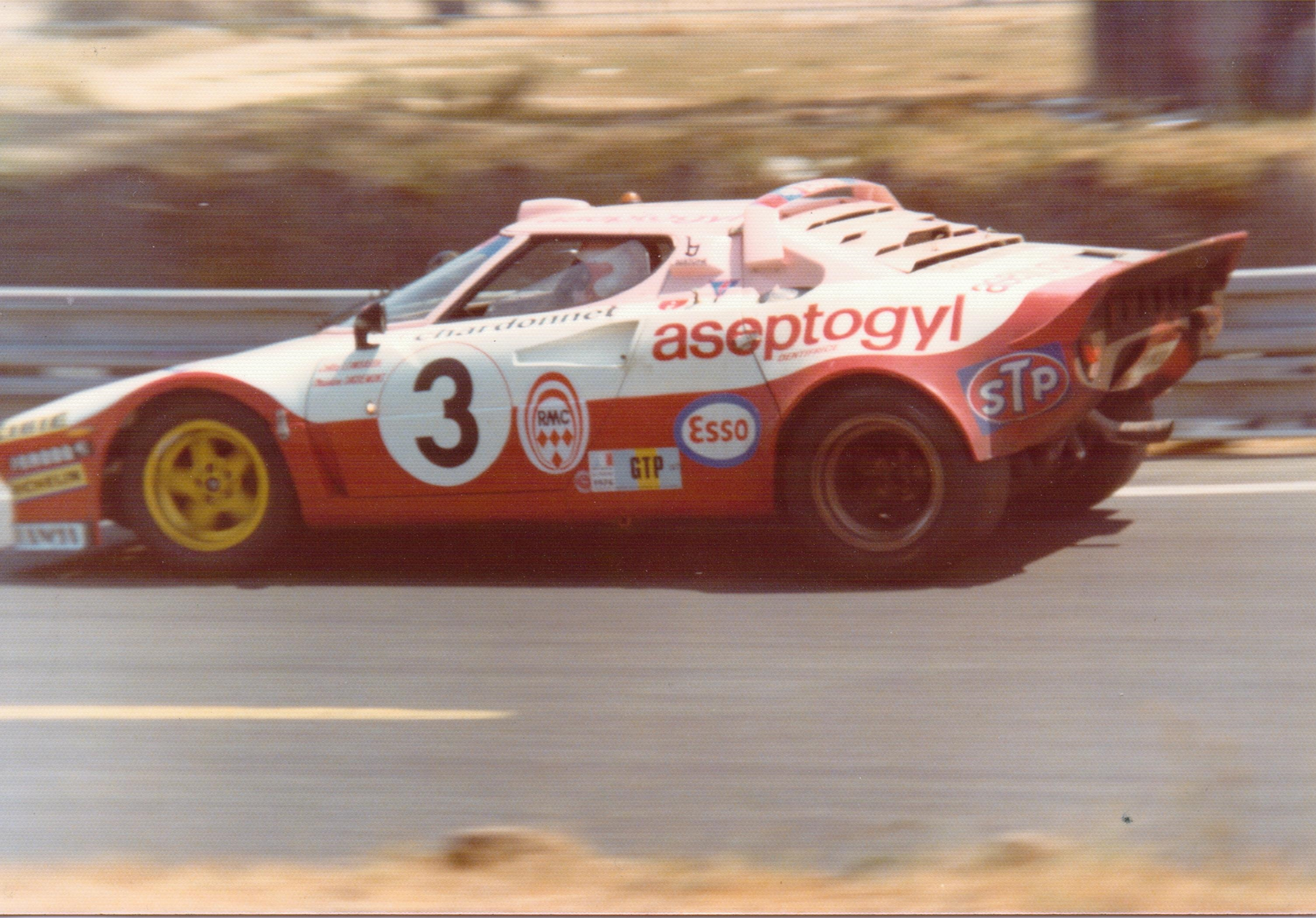
Lancia Stratos turbo of Lombardi/Dacremont

The rise of the privateer car-builder continued. Alain de Cadenet, with his regular co-driver Chris Craft, returned with a slightly modified version of his Lola T380, now capable of 320 kp/h (200 mph). This year was the production debut for another man passionate to win the race in a car of his own design: Le Mans local Jean Rondeau’s team was the first to build a car to the ACO's new GTP specification. Financed by Charles James of French home-furnishings company Inaltéra, the car had the proven Cosworth DFV V8 engine and Hewland gearbox. A team of notables was brought in to run the cars: Vic Elford was team manager, with Henri Pescarolo/Jean-Pierre Beltoise in the lead car and Jean-Pierre Jaussaud/Christine Beckers with Rondeau himself in the second car. Peugeot designer Gérard Welter and engineer Michel Meunier had started making their own racing cars under the name WM. They designed the P76 for the new GTP formula, using the Peugeot 2.7-litre V6 PRV engine. In patriotic red-white-blue, they had French drivers Claude Ballot-Léna, Guy Chasseuil and Xavier Mathiot. The final GTP entry was a return of Lancia after 23 years. The Lancia Stratos, homologated in Group 4, was a successful rally-car for the works team, and was being adapted to the Group 5 regulations by designer Giampaolo Dallara and ex-Ferrari racer and engineer Mike Parkes. A privateer entry of French rally drivers Robert Neyret and Bernard Darniche added a KKK-turbo to the 2.4-litre Ferrari V6 and modified the bodywork and suspension. Driver were the female pairing of Lella Lombardi and Christine Dacremont.

Kremer Racing was one of the strong customer Porsche teams and the first to get the new 935. Under their own modification, what became known as the 935K-1 retained more of the look of the original 911 RSR. Team driver Hans Heyer teamed up with Mexicans Juan Carlos Bolaños, Eduardo Negrete and American Billy Sprowls. Porsche also supplied the RSR 2.1-litre turbo engine to customers to retrofit into their 908 prototypes to keep them competitive. Reinhold Joest and Egon Evertz both entered their uprated cars.

The under-2000 class was essentially a battle between Lola and Chevron. The cars were designed to fit a variety of powerplants, with most teams settling on either the British Cosworth FVC or French ROC engines. A solid entry of nine cars was accepted that also included two from the Société ROC and cars from small manufacturers Jörg Obermoser (Toj) and Charles Graemiger (Cheetah).

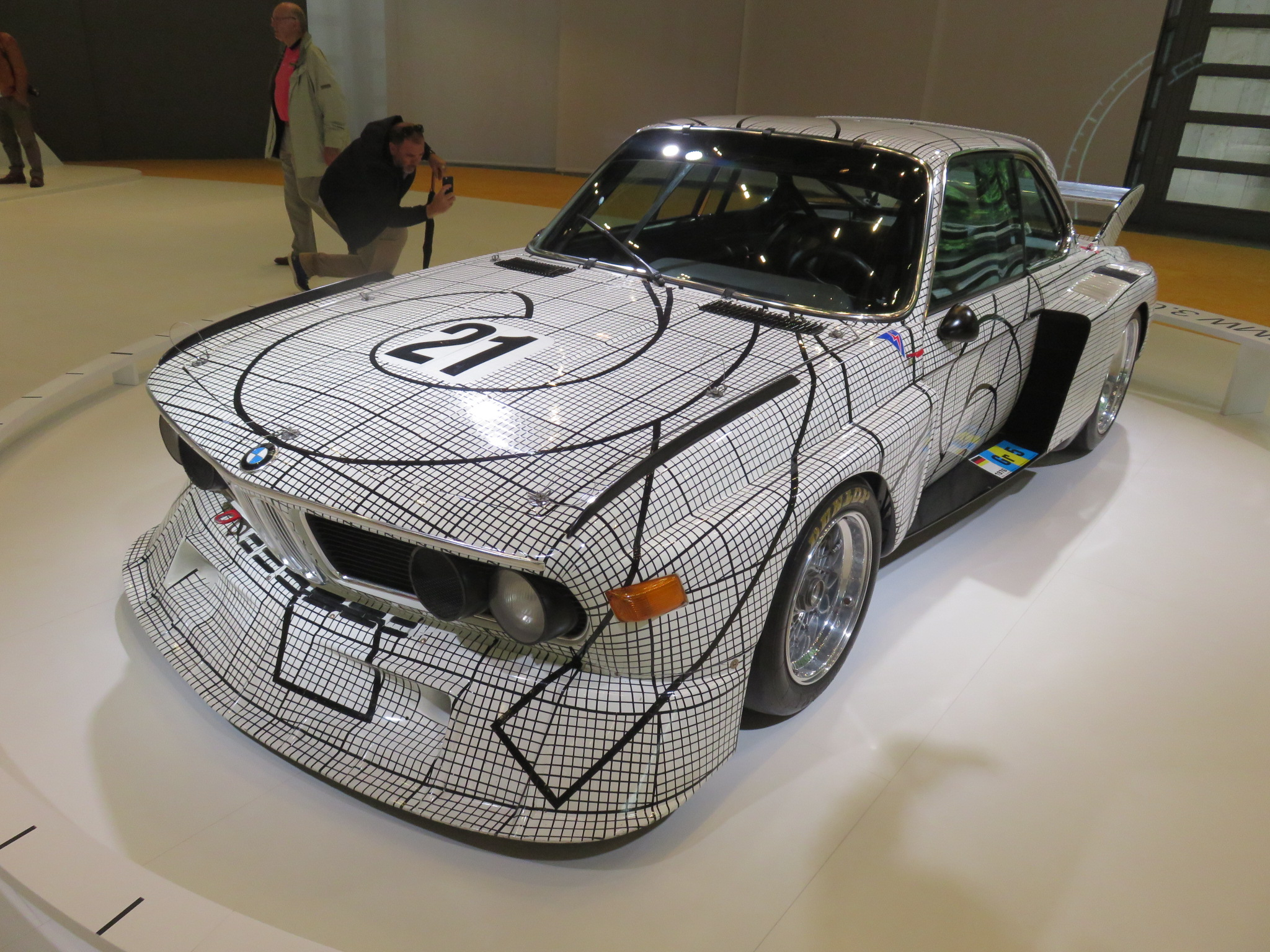
BMW 3.0 CSL "Art-car" by Frank Stella

Porsche's main rival in Group 5 was BMW. Porsche, through Peter Gregg’s Brumos Racing, had won the 1975 IMSA season and both manufacturers had won two Championship races this season. The BMW used the 3.0 CSL as the base design, releasing cars to their customer teams. Schnitzer Motorsport entered one for Dieter Quester, Alpina-Faltz had one for Harald Grohs and new British team Hermetite Racing had John Fitzpatrick as lead driver. There was also a first privateer entry from Australia led by Peter Brock. The works team also adapted a CSL, fitting it with 19” rear tyres, a 3.2-litre engine and twin KKK-turbochargers that put out a monstrous 750 bhp. Painted by American artist Frank Stella, it was the second BMW Art Car and was driven by Brian Redman and Peter Gregg (along with art-car originator Hervé Poulain as reserve).

Group 4 was dominated by Porsche. As well as the 340 bhp 911 Carrera RSR, a number of the top customer teams ran its successor, the 934. The 3-litre was turbocharged to now put out 480 bhp. The German Kremer and Gelo teams, and French ASA-Cachia teams were early purchasers. The only opposition to the Porsche juggernaut was the returning French privateer Andre Haller, who had uprated his Datsun to the new 2.6-litre variant.

The ACO was working closer with IMSA and Bill France Jr. of NASCAR and Daytona Speedway, to encourage inter-series racing. To that end four IMSA and two NASCAR-spec cars were entered. Although the race clashed with a NASCAR race at Riverside two of the junior teams arrived. Hershel McGriff raced with his son in their Dodge Charger, while Dick Brooks shared his Ford Torino with Dick Hutcherson (also a NASCAR-driver, and veteran from the 1966 race with Ford) and Marcel Mignot (a driving instructor at Le Mans circuit). The cars had to be adapted for hard right-hand turns and be fitted with window wipers and lights. Easily the heaviest cars at the race, they attracted considerable media attention and were very popular with the French public. Current American Trans-Am champion John Greenwood had previously brought Corvettes over to race. This year his IMSA-spec modified Corvette, nicknamed the “Batmobile” arrived. The chassis was designed by Bob Riley (ex-Ford GT and Saturn rocket engineer) and aerodynamics by Zora Arkus-Duntov. Although heavy, and with big disc-brakes, its giant 427 cubic inch V8 pushed out 700 bhp and got the car up to an impressive 355 kp/h (220 mph). Michael Keyser bought one of the new Chevrolet Monzas modified by DeKon Engineering, built to take on Porsche in the IMSA series. Tom Vaugh and Diego Febles also entered two of those IMSA-spec Porsches for the race.

== Practice ==
On Wednesday, the first day of practice, Jean-Pierre Jabouille immediately threw down the gauntlet with a blistering 3:33.1 lap that dissuaded the Porsches from trying to compete for pole position. Ickx's best time in the 936 was a distant 3:39.8 for second and Stommelen was third in the 935 with 3:41.7. Xavier Lapeyre, in his privateer Group 6 Lola impressed getting fourth fastest with 3:44.0, ahead of Joest in the other works Porsche (3:45.4). Next were the two Mirages at almost identical times to their qualifying times from the previous year. Eighth was Brian Redman in the Group 5 BMW art-car, but they blew both engines in the process. After a clutch failure, John Greenwood's Corvette monster made it to ninth, and Chris Craft in the De Cadenet rounded out the top-10.

The Pescarolo/Beltoise Inaltéra was fastest of the GTP class in 12th (3:56.9) with the Hezemans/Schenken Gelo Porsche the quickest in Group 4 (4:.01.1) by four seconds over Wollek's Kremer Porsche. The Alpina-Faltz BMW had qualified 18th. But its ultra-thin doors flexed at speed and let in the exhaust fumes makes the drivers quite nauseous. Best qualifier in the 2-litre group 6 class was Servanin/Ferrier Chevron of Société ROC in 19th (4:05.4). Both TOJ entries had considerable problems and neither qualified. The big NASCARS struggled with the tight corners and winding track and could only manage 47th (McGriff 4:29.7) and 54th (Brooks 4:38.0) while working on engine problems caused by the fuel's low octane rating.

== Race ==
=== Start ===
The hot weather through the week continued into the race weekend – it was to be one of the hottest Le Mans in years. Honorary starter this year was Bill France Jr., President of NASCAR. From the rolling start, the Alpine immediately shot out into the lead, followed by the works Porsches. Redman, knowing he was on borrowed time, wound the BMW's turbo right up and blasted past Stommelen and Joest up into third before an inevitable oil-leak forced him to pit in a cloud of smoke. Meanwhile, on the first lap, the NASCAR Dodge had ground to a halt with burnt-out pistons from the lower-octane fuel. Other early casualties included the French Lola with engine issues, and the IMSA Chev Monza that had battled for sixth with John Greenwood's IMSA-Corvette. A bent propshaft put the Monza in the pits and out of the race.

After an hour, the two 936s and the Alpine had a lap over the Martini 935, then back to De Cadenet, the two Mirages, Greenwood, Kinnunen in the Evertz 908, and the two Inaltéras filling the top-10. The Alpine had pitted after 10 laps to check rising engine temperatures, and with its smaller fuel-tank the Alpine had to pit more often. A misfire necessitated changing sparkplugs and then the ignition box, dropping Tambay to 7th. Ickx took over the lead when the French car was delayed. In the third hour three of the BMWs had problems: Redman's engine finally gave out, as did that of the Hermetite car, stranding Walkinshaw out at Arnage, while Posey had to bring his in to change the windscreen. Many drivers were suffering in the strong late-afternoon heat. The Inaltéra team had its problems: the Pescarolo/Beltoise had oil-leak and alternator issues, while the Rondeau car needed a shock absorber replaced twice. Also before 8pm the thirsty works 935 was delayed as night fell having to have its alternator replaced, then a puncture at high-speed tore up the rear bodywork. A puncture also put out the Greenwood Corvette when it damaged the rear suspension and fuel-cell.

Then, at 9pm, as it started getting darker there was a bad accident on the Mulsanne Straight. André Haller, just out on his second driving stint, lost control of his Datsun 260Z when it slipped onto the grass verge at the kink near the end of the straight. It spun several times, crashed in to the barrier and caught fire. Although marshals managed to extricate Haller from the wreck, he died en route to hospital from severe chest injuries.

=== Night ===
The Kremer 935 had been holding a solid 7th behind the De Cadenet when the clutch failed as night fell, dropping it down the order. The Alpine had fought its way back up the field (Jabouille setting the fastest lap of the race), overtaking the Bell/Schuppan Mirage to get into third until it was stopped for good by a blown piston. When the lead Mirage lost 4 laps at 1am fixing its alternator, the team car of Migault/Lafosse took over 3rd place. The remaining two works BMWs were running eighth and tenth at midnight. But the Schnitzer car was put out by a broken camshaft early in the morning, just as the British Hermetite entry had.

By the halfway point, at 4am, Ickx and van Lennep had completed 180 laps, with a 2-lap cushion over their 936 teammates and six over Lafosse in the Mirage. The De Cadenet was fourth (169) from the second Mirage (168) and Martini 935 (167). The Gelo Porsche was next (162), leading Group 4, followed by the Alpina-BMW (161), the Touroul/Cudini Porsche RSR (160) and the Joest 908 in tenth.

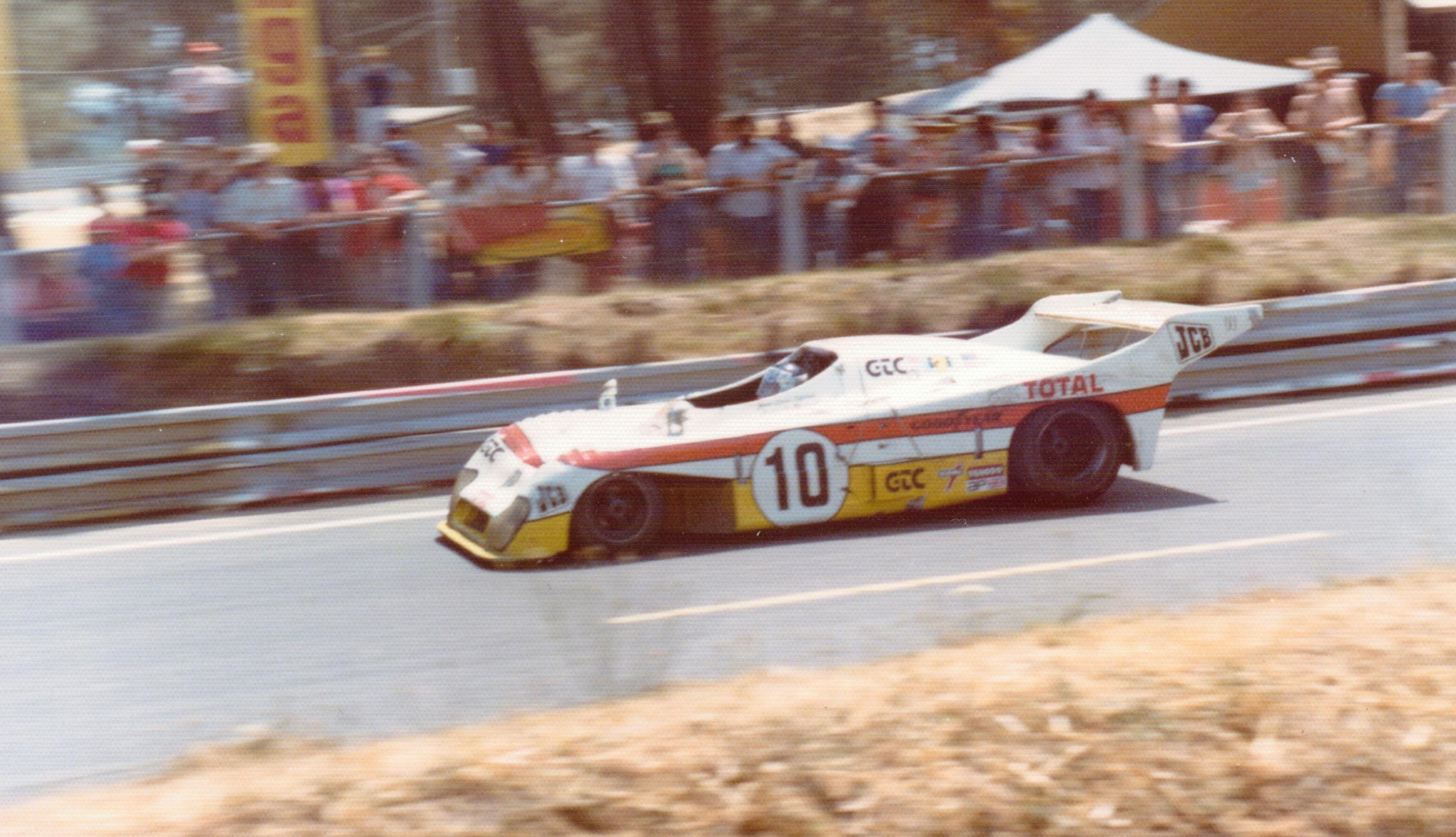
The Migault/Lafosse Mirage

=== Morning ===
As the morning broke the Ickx/van Lennep Porsche was still running like clockwork doing a metronomic 15 laps per hour. However, behind them most cars started having problems: The other 936 lost 20 minutes at 7am fixing its valve-gear, and then its clutch broke straight afterward. The Mirages had issues with their fuel pumps, while the De Cadenet lost a crucial 8 minutes with a jammed wheel nut The works 935 had been closing fast, but then had an ignition malfunction, and later a turbo failure at midday.

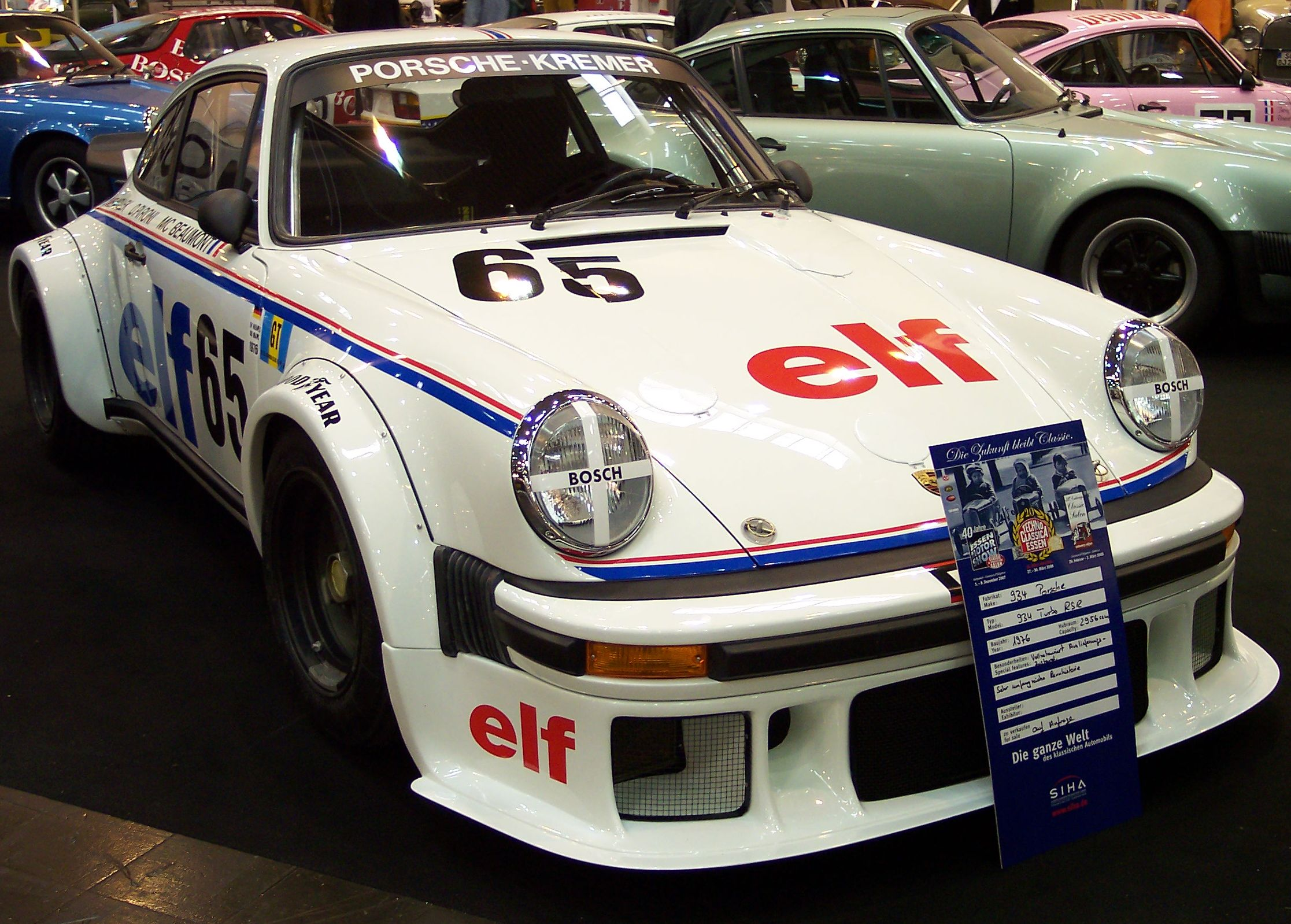
Porsche 934 of Kremer Racing drivers Wollek/Pironi

This left the Ickx/van Lennep car with a 16-lap lead, until they lost five laps spending 34 minutes repairing a split exhaust pipe (to keep the turbo working) just before midday. With four hours to go, the Migault/Lafosse Mirage was now only two laps ahead of the De Cadenet, the Stommelen/Schurti 935 three laps further back then the second Mirage in fifth a distant 6 laps behind.

The Gelo Porsche had been comfortably leading Group 4, and was running sixth overall, when it came to the pits running with only 1st and 2nd, to get a gearbox rebuild. They resumed and eventually finished 16th. The Porsche Club Romand car inherited the class lead, but then its engine expired soon after midday while running in ninth.

=== Finish and post-race ===
Things were coming to a predictable end when drama broke out in the final hour. Hans Heyer was at speed on the back straight when an oil line came loose in the Kremer 935's engine. A spectacular fire broke out but Heyer was able to park it by the marshal post at Mulsanne corner and get out safely. With less than twenty minutes to go, the rear engine cover of Lafosse's Mirage flew off. Although the car lost time in the pits getting it replaced, and then trying to restart, he was able to stay a lap ahead of a hard-charging Chris Craft in the resurgent De Cadenet. In the end Ickx and van Lennep cruised to an eleven-lap victory, and with two Le Mans victories (including the record-breaking 1971 race) Gijs van Lennep immediately announced his retirement. It was the first victory for a turbo or super-charged car since Bugatti in 1939.

The 935 of Stommelen/Schurti was fourth, 23 laps behind their teammates but clear winner in Group 5. The other Mirage, race-winner in 1975, was fifth. The Pescarolo/Beltoise Inaltéra won the new GTP class, finishing 8th, while the winner of Group 4 was the privateer Porsche of “Segolen”/Gadal/Ouvière after all the new 934s failed. Tom Waugh's 911 RSR was the sole IMSA finisher in 14th. In the 2-litre Sports class, the three Lolas finished while the three Chevrons did not. Winning the class was Daniel Brillat's Lola-Cosworth in 15th by a clear 27 laps. The only Group 2 entry, the BMW of Jean-Louis Ravenel, was the final classified finisher over 100 laps and 1500 km behind the winner.

It was a strong debut by the new Porsche 936 and 935, which would re-assert the company's dominance at Le Mans, and in world sports-car racing, over the next few years. It would also mark the start of the turbo-era.

== Official results ==
=== Finishers ===
Results taken from Quentin Spurring's book, officially licensed by the ACO Class Winners are in Bold text.

Pos	Class	No.	Team	Drivers	Chassis	Engine	Tyre	Laps
1	**Gp.6**; **3.0**	**20**	**(Germany) Martini Racing Porsche System**	**(Belgium) Jacky Ickx** **(Netherlands) Gijs van Lennep**	Porsche 936	Porsche 2.1L F6 turbo	G	349
2	Gp.6; 3.0	10	(United States) Grand Touring Cars Inc.	(France) Jean-Louis Lafosse (France) François Migault	Mirage M8	Cosworth DFV 3.0L V8	G	338
3	Gp.6; 3.0	12	(United Kingdom) A. de Cadenet (private entrant)	(United Kingdom) Alain de Cadenet (United Kingdom) Chris Craft	De Cadenet-Lola T380 LM76	Cosworth DFV 3.0L V8	G	337
4	**Gp.5**; **SP**	**40**	**(Germany) Martini Racing Porsche System**	**(Germany) Rolf Stommelen** **(Liechtenstein) Manfred Schurti**	Porsche 935	Porsche 3.0L F6 turbo	D	331
5	Gp.6; 3.0	11	(United States) Grand Touring Cars Inc.	(United Kingdom) Derek Bell (Australia) Vern Schuppan	Mirage M8	Cosworth DFV 3.0L V8	G	326
6	Gp.5; SP	52	(France) G. Méo (private entrant)	(France) Raymond Touroul (France) Alain Cudini	Porsche 911 Carrera RSR	Porsche 3.0L F6	D	314
7	Gp.6; 3.0	17	(Germany) Joest Racing	(Germany) Ernst Kraus (Germany) Günther Steckkönig	Porsche 908/3 Turbo	Porsche 2.1L F6 turbo	G	313
8	**GTP**	**1**	**(France) Inaltéra**	**(France) Henri Pescarolo** **(France) Jean-Pierre Beltoise**	Inaltéra LM	Cosworth DFV 3.0L V8	M	305
9	Gp.5; SP	63	(Germany) Egon Evertz K.G.	(Germany) Heinz Martin (Germany) Hartwig Bertrams (Germany) Egon Evertz	Porsche 934	Porsche 3.0L F6 turbo	D	302
10	Gp.5; SP	42	(Germany) BMW Motorsport GmbH (Germany) Alpina-Faltz	(Germany) Harald Grohs (United States) Sam Posey (Belgium) Baron Hughes de Fierlandt	BMW 3.0 CSL	BMW 3.5L S6	G	299
11	Gp.5; SP	54	(France) L. Meznarie (private entrant)	(France) Hubert Striebig (France) Anne-Charlotte Verney (Germany) Helmut Kirschoffer	Porsche 934/5	Porsche 3.0L F6 turbo	D	298
12	**Gp.4**; **GT**	**71**	**(France) "Ségolen"** (private entrant)	**(France) "Ségolen” (André Gahinet)** **(France) Michel Ouvière** **(France) Jean-Yves Gadal**	Porsche 911 Carrera RSR	Porsche 3.0L F6	M	292
13	Gp.5; SP	53	(France) ASA Cachia	(France) Thierry Sabine (France) Philippe Dagoreau (France) Jean-Claude Andruet	Porsche 911 Carrera RSR	Porsche 3.0L F6	G	288
14	**IMSA**; **GT**	**77**	**(United States) T. Vaugh** (private entrant)	**(United States) Tom Vaugh** **(United States) John Rulon-Miller** **(France) Jean-Pierre Laffeach**	Porsche 911 Carrera RSR	Porsche 3.0L F6	G	283
15	**Gp.6**; **2.0**	**35**	**(France) Daniel Brillat** **(Switzerland) Georges Morand** (private entrant)	**(Switzerland) Georges Morand** **(Switzerland) François Trisconi** **(Switzerland) André Chevalley**	Lola T292	Cosworth BDG 1998cc S4	F	279
16	Gp.4; GT	57	(Germany) Gelo Racing Team	(Australia) Tim Schenken (Netherlands) Toine Hezemans	Porsche 934	Porsche 3.0L F6 turbo	G	277
17	Gp.4; GT	67	(France) J. Laplacette (private entrant)	(France) Joël Laplacette (France) Alain Leroux (France) Georges Bourdillat	Porsche 911 Carrera RSR	Porsche 3.0L F6	M	273
18	Gp.5; SP	50	(France) T. Perrier (private entrant)	(France) Thierry Perrier (France) Guy de Saintpierre (France) Martine Rénier	Porsche 911 Carrera RSR	Porsche 3.0L F6	D	273
19	Gp.4; GT	65	(Germany) Kremer Racing	(France) Bob Wollek (France) Didier Pironi (France) Marie-Claude Beaumont	Porsche 934	Porsche 3.0L F6 turbo	G	270
20	GTP	3	(France) Aseptogyl	(Italy) Lella Lombardi (France) Christine Dacremont	Lancia Stratos Turbo	Ferrari Dino 2.4L V6 turbo	M	265
21	GTP	2	(France) Inaltéra	(France) Jean Rondeau (France) Jean-Pierre Jaussaud (Belgium) Christine Beckers	Inaltéra LM	Cosworth DFV 3.0L V8	M	264
22	Gp.6; 2.0	31	(United Kingdom) Chandler IBEC (United Kingdom) Dorset Racing Associates	(United Kingdom) Tony Birchenhough (United Kingdom) Ian Bracey (United Kingdom) Simon Phillips (United Kingdom) Brian Joscelyne	Lola T294	Cosworth FVC 1950cc S4	G	252
23	Gp.5; SP	55	(France) Equipe Alméras Frères	(France) Christian Poirot (France) René Boubet (France) Jean-Claude Lagniez	Porsche 911 Carrera RSR	Porsche 3.0L F6	D	245
24	**Gp.2**; **TS**	**95**	**(France) Les Maisons de Week-End** (private entrant)	**(France) Jean-Louis Ravenel** **(France) Jean ‘Jacky’ Ravenel** **(France) Jean-Marie Détrin**	BMW 3.0 CSL	BMW 3.5L S6	D	237
N/C*	Gp.6; 2.0	30	(France) J.-M. Lemerle (private entrant)	(France) Jean-Marie Lemerle (France) Alain Levié (France) Patrick Daire	Lola T294	Simca-ROC 1996cc S4	G	218
N/C*	Gp.4; GT	61	(France) ASA Cachia	(France) Jean-Claude Andruet (France) Henri Cachia (France) Jacques Borras	Porsche 934	Porsche 3.0L F6 turbo	D	203
N/C*	Gp.4; GT	70	(Belgium) "Beurlys" (private entrant)	(Belgium) “Beurlys” (Jean Blaton) (United Kingdom) Nick Faure (Australia) John Goss	Porsche 934	Porsche 3.0L F6 turbo	D	168

- 'Note *: Not Classified because did not cover sufficient distance (70% of the leader) at the 12, 18 or 24-hour intervals.

=== Did Not Finish ===
Pos	Class	No	Team	Drivers	Chassis	Engine	Tyre	Laps	Reason
DNF	Gp.5; SP	47	(Germany) Porsche Kremer Racing	(Mexico) Juan Carlos Bolaños (Mexico) Eduardo Lopez Negrete (Mexico) Billy Sprowls (Germany) Hans Heyer	Porsche 935	Porsche 2.8L F6 turbo	G	272	Fire (24hr)
DNF	Gp.4; GT	58	(Switzerland) Porsche Club Romand (France) G.V.E.A.	(Switzerland) Bernard Cheneviére (Switzerland) Peter Zbinden (Switzerland) Nicolas Bührer	Porsche 934	Porsche 3.0L F6 turbo	M	270	Engine (22hr)
DNF	Gp.6; 2.0	26	(France) Société Racing Organisation; Course	(France) Fred Stalder (France) Albert Dufrène (France) Alain Flotard	Chevron B36	Simca-ROC 1996cc S4	G	241	Oil pump (23hr)
DNF	Gp.4; GT	69	(Switzerland) Schiller Racing Team	(Switzerland) Claude Haldi (Switzerland) Florian Vetsch	Porsche 934	Porsche 3.0L F6 turbo	G	219	Engine (19hr)
DNF	Gp.6; 3.0	18	(Germany) Martini Racing Porsche System	(Germany) Reinhold Joest (Germany) Jürgen Barth	Porsche 936	Porsche 2.1L F6 turbo	G	218	Engine (17hr)
DNF	Gp.5; SP	46	(Australia) Team Brock (private entrant)	(Australia) Peter Brock (Australia) Brian Muir (France) Jean-Claude Aubriet	BMW 3.0 CSL	BMW 3.5L S6	D	156	Transmission (19hr)
DNF	IMSA; GT	78	(Puerto Rico) Diego Febles Racing (private entrant)	(Puerto Rico) Diego Febles (United Kingdom) Alec Poole (Puerto Rico) Hiram Cruz	Porsche 911 Carrera RSR	Porsche 3.0L F6	G	144	Transmission (15hr)
DNF	Gp.6; 3.0	19	(France) Renault Sport	(France) Jean-Pierre Jabouille (France) Patrick Tambay (France) José Dolhem	Renault Alpine A442	Renault 1997cc V6 turbo	M	135	Engine (11hr)
DNF	Gp.5; SP	44	(France) ASPM-Tanday Music (private entrant)	(France) Jean-Claude Justice (France) Jean Bélin	BMW 3.0 CSL	BMW 3.5L S6	D	128	Engine (13hr)
DNF	GTP	5	(France) Ecurie Batteries et Piles TS	(France) Claude Ballot-Léna (France) Guy Chasseuil (France) Xavier Mathiot	WM P76	Peugeot PRV 2.7L V6	M	125	Fuel cell (16hr)
DNF	Gp.6; 3.0	16	(Germany) Egon Evertz K.G.	(Germany) Egon Evertz (Finland) Leo Kinnunen	Porsche 908/3 Turbo	Porsche 2.1L F6 turbo	D	124	Engine (11hr)
DNF	Gp.5; SP	43	(Germany) BMW Motorsport GmbH (Germany) Schnitzer Motorsport	(Austria) Dieter Quester (Germany) Albrecht Krebs (Belgium) Alain Peltier	BMW 3.0 CSL	BMW 3.5L S6	G	117	Engine/fire (12hr)
DNF	NASCAR	90	(United States) NASCAR (United States) W.C. Donlavey	(United States) Dick Brooks (United States) Dick Hutcherson (France) Marcel Mignot	Ford Torino	Ford 7.0L V8	G	104	Transmission (11hr)
DNF	Gp.6; 2.0	27	(France) Société Racing Organisation; Course	(France) François Servanin (France) Laurent Ferrier	Chevron B36	Simca-ROC 1996cc S4	G	88	Transmission (11hr)
DSQ	Gp.6; 2.0	29	(France) J. Thibault (private entrant)	(France) José Thibault (France) Alain Hubert (France) Michel Lateste	Lenham	Cosworth FVC 1840cc S4	G	88	Insufficient distance (15hr)
DNF	Gp.4 / GTX *	72	(Switzerland) W. Vollery (private entrant)	(Switzerland) William Vollery (Switzerland) Jean-Pierre Aeschlimann (France) Roger Dorchy	Porsche 911 Carrera RS	Porsche 3.0L F6	M	82	Electrics (9hr)
DNF	Gp.4; GT	62	(France) P. Dagoreau (private entrant)	(France) Christian Bussi (France) Philippe Gurdjian (France) Christian Gouttepifre	Porsche 911 Carrera RSR	Porsche 3.0L F6	D	79	Engine (9hr)
DNF	Gp.5; SP	49	(Germany) Gelo Racing Team	(Germany) Clemens Schickentanz (New Zealand) Howden Ganley	Porsche 911 Carrera RSR	Porsche 3.0L F6	G	74	Transmission (7hr)
DNF	Gp.6; 2.0	33	(Switzerland) Schäfer Team (private entrant)	(Switzerland) Georges Schäfer (France) Jean-Pierre Adatte (Switzerland) Riccardo Albanesi	Chevron B36	Cosworth FVC 1980cc S4	F	62	Engine (7hr)
DNF	Gp.4; GT	73	(France) Sion Auto (private entrant)	(France) André Haller (France) Claude Buchet (France) Jean-Luc Favresse	Datsun 260Z	Datsun 2.6L S6	G	39	Fatal accident (7hr)
DNF	IMSA; GT	76	(United States) IMSA (United States) Greenwood Corvettes	(United States) John Greenwood (France) Bernard Darniche	Chevrolet Corvette Stingray	Chevrolet 7.0L V8	G	29	Fuel cell (5hr)
DNF	Gp.5; SP	41	(Germany) BMW Motorsport GmbH	(United Kingdom) Brian Redman (United States) Peter Gregg	BMW 3.0 CSL Turbo	BMW 3.2L S6 turbo	G	23	Oil leak (5hr)
DNF	Gp.5; SP	45	(United Kingdom) Hermetite Productions Ltd.	(United Kingdom) John Fitzpatrick (United Kingdom) Tom Walkinshaw	BMW 3.0 CSL	BMW 3.5L S6	G	17	Engine/fire (3hr)
DNF	IMSA; GT	75	(United States) IMSA (United States) M. Keyser	(United States) Michael Keyser (United States) Eddie Wachs	Chevrolet Monza GT	Chevrolet 4.4L V8	G	11	Transmission (3hr)
DNF	Gp.6; 3.0	21	(Switzerland) GVEA Porsche Club Ramond (France) X. Lapeyre (private entrant)	(France) Xavier Lapeyre (France) Bernard Chevanne	Lola T286	Cosworth DFV 3.0L V8	G	9	Engine (4hr)
DNF	Gp.5; SP	48	(France) J.-L. Chateau (private entrant)	(France) Jean-Louis Chateau (France) Dominique Fornage (France) Jean-Claude Guérie	Porsche 934/5	Porsche 3.0L F6 turbo	D	9	Transmission (7hr)
DNF	NASCAR	4	(United States) NASCAR (United States) H. McGriff	(United States) Hershel McGriff (United States) Doug McGriff	Dodge Charger	Dodge Hemi 5.6L V8	G	2	Oil leak (2hr)
DNF	Gp.6; 2.0	36	(Switzerland) Cheetah Racing Cars	(France) Daniel Brillat (Switzerland) Michel Degourmois (France) "Dépnic" (Jean-Claude Depince)	Cheetah G-601	BMW 1998cc S4	G	2	Transmission (3hr)

- Note: listed as a Group 4 car in Spurring and on 1976 Le Mans program's Entry List. But listed as GTX by World Sports Cars, Le Mans History & TeamDan websites .

=== Did Not Start ===
Pos	Class	No	Team	Drivers	Chassis	Engine	Tyre	Reason
DNS	GTX	82	(Switzerland) Wicky Racing Team	(France) Martial Delalande (France) Jacques Marché (Morocco) Max Cohen-Olivar	De Tomaso Pantera	Ford 5.8L V8		Engine
DNQ	Gp.6; 3.0	8	(Switzerland) Racing Team Schulthess (private entrant)	(Switzerland) Heinz Schulthess (France) Jean-Claude Lagniez (France) Max Antichan	Toj SC301	Cosworth DFV 3.0L V8	**G**	Did not qualify
DNQ	Gp.6; 2.0	25	(Switzerland) Racing Team Schulthess (private entrant)	(Switzerland) Heinz Schulthess (France) Jean-Claude Lagniez (France) Max Antichan	Toj SC204	Simca-ROC 1996cc S4	**G**	Did not qualify
DNQ	Gp.4; GT	83	(Germany) P. Rilly (private entrant)	(France) Paul Rilly (France) Roger Le Veve	Porsche 911 Carrera SC	Porsche 3.0L F6	**M**	Failed scrutineering

=== Class Winners ===
Class	Winning car	Winning drivers
Group 6 S Sports 3-litre	#20 Porsche 936	Ickx / van Lennep *
Group 6 S Sports 2-litre	#35 Lola T292	Trisconi / Morand / Chevalley *
Group 5 SP Special Production	#40 Porsche 935	Stommelen / Schurti *
Group 4 GTS Special GT	#71 Porsche 911 Carrera RSR	“Segolen” / Ouvière / Gadal
Group 2 TS Special Touring	#95 BMW 3.0 CSL	Ravenel / Ravenel / Detrin
GTP Le Mans GT Prototype	#1 Inaltéra LM	Pescarolo / Beltoise *
GTX Le Mans GT Experimental	no entrants	
IMSA GT	#77 Porsche 911 Carrera RSR	Waugh / Rulon-Miller / Laffeach *
NASCAR Stock car	no finishers	

- Note: setting a new class distance record.

=== Six-Hour Segment Winners ===
Bracket	Sponsor	No	Team	Drivers	Chassis	Laps
1 – 6 hours	Prix Inaltéra	20	(Germany) Martini Racing Porsche System	Ickx / van Lennep	Porsche 936	91
7 – 12 hours	Prix SMGF	20	(Germany) Martini Racing Porsche System	Ickx / van Lennep	Porsche 936	90
13 – 18 hours	Prix Nescafé	20	(Germany) Martini Racing Porsche System	Ickx / van Lennep	Porsche 936	91
19 – 24 hours	Prix Moët et Chandon	12	(United Kingdom) Alain de Cadenet	De Cadenet / Craft	De Cadenet-Lola T380 LM76	84

=== Statistics ===
Taken from Quentin Spurring's book, officially licensed by the ACO

- Pole Position –J.-P. Jabouille, #19 Renault-Alpine A442 – 3:33.1secs; 230.43 km/h (143.18 mph)
- Fastest Lap – J.-P. Jabouille, #19 Renault-Alpine A442 – 3:43.0secs; 220.20 km/h (136.83 mph)
- Winning Distance – 4,769.92 km (2,963.89 mi)
- Winner's Average Speed – 198.7 km/h (123.5 mph)
- Attendance – ?

Citations
