= Renault Alpine A442 =

Former French racing car prototype

Renault Alpine A442/A443
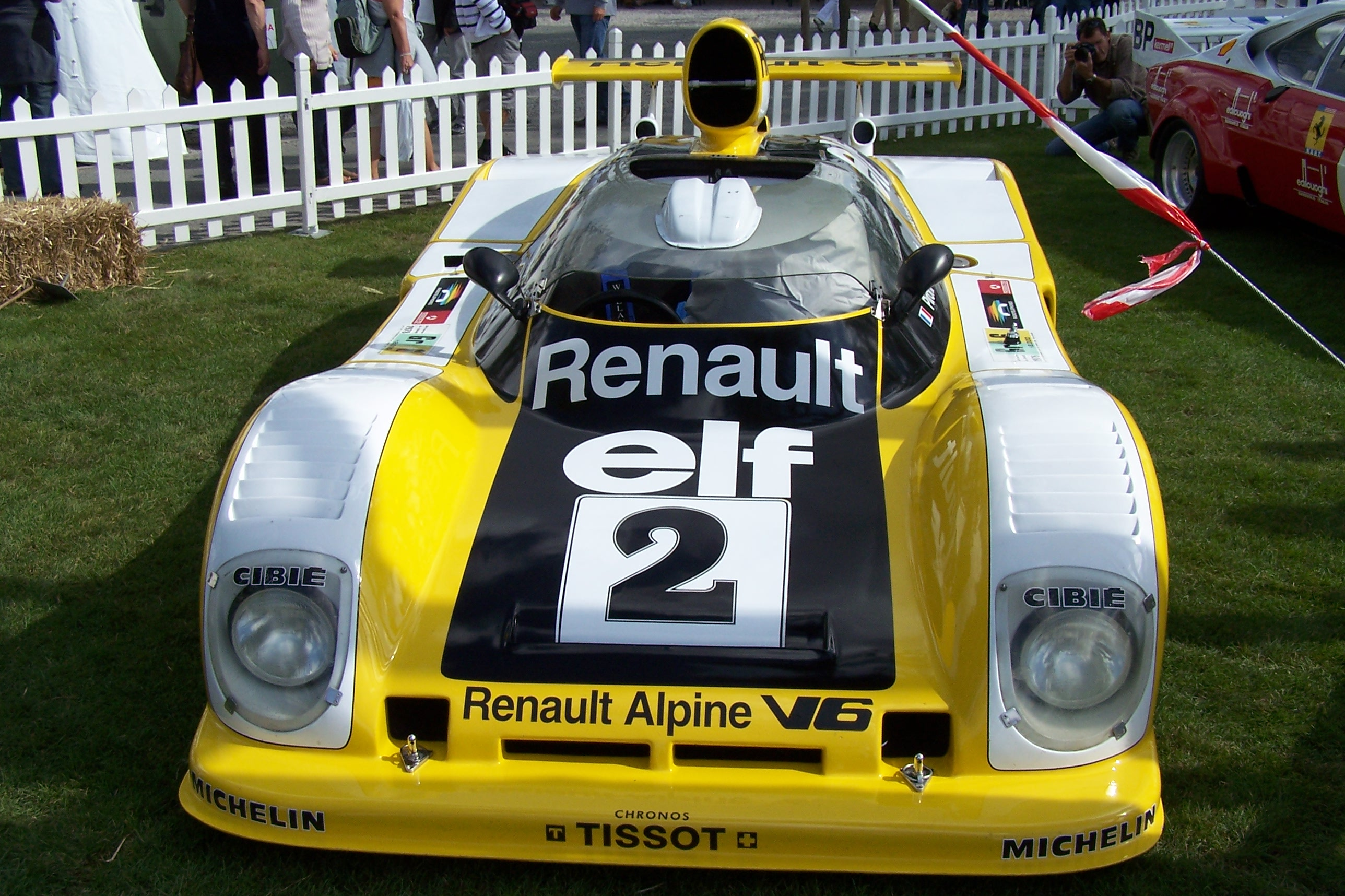
- The Renault Alpine A442B, wearing the bubble canopy.
- Category: Group 6 sports prototype
- Constructor: Alpine/Renault
- Designer(s): François Castaing; Bernard Dudot
- Predecessor: Alpine A441
- Successor: Alpine A424

Technical specifications
- Chassis: Aluminium-reinforced steel spaceframe
- Suspension (front): Double wishbone
- Suspension (rear): Double wishbone
- Engine: Renault-Gordini 1997 cc 90° V6 turbo, mid-mounted
- Transmission: Hewland TL200 5-speed manual
- Fuel: Elf
- Tyres: Michelin

Competition history
- Notable entrants: Renault Sport
- Notable drivers: (France) Gérard Larrousse (France) Jean-Pierre Jabouille (France) Henri Pescarolo (South Africa) Jody Scheckter (France) Didier Pironi (France) Jean-Pierre Jaussaud (France) Patrick Tambay (France) Jacques Laffite (France) Jean-Pierre Jarier (United Kingdom) Derek Bell (France) René Arnoux
- Debut: 1975 Mugello 1000 km
Wins	F/Laps
2	1

The Renault Alpine A442 (also known as the Alpine Renault A442) is a sports prototype racing car, designed and built by Alpine, but funded and powered by Alpine's owners Renault, specifically to contest the 24 Hours of Le Mans race. Variants were entered for the event in 1976, 1977 and 1978. An A442B finally won the race on the third occasion, in the hands of Didier Pironi and Jean-Pierre Jaussaud. Also entered in 1978 was the updated Renault Alpine A443 model; essentially an A442 chassis, but powered by a new 2138 cc engine. Following this all-French victory in the premier French motorsport event, Renault withdrew from sports car racing to concentrate their efforts in Formula One.

== Design ==
Alpine had been working with increasingly close ties to Renault since 1971, and by the beginning of the A442 project in 1975 the two companies were almost completely merged. Renault finally bought Alpine outright in early 1976, Renault inheriting Alpine's sports prototype program. The A442 was a direct evolution of the successful Alpine A440 and title-winning A441 models. However, unlike the previous cars, the A442's 2.0L Renault-Gordini powerplant boasted a large Garrett turbocharger, pushing power output to 490 bhp (365 kW). Over the next three years this would increase to well over 500 bhp (370 kW), with the A443's 2.2L unit developing 520 bhp (388 kW).

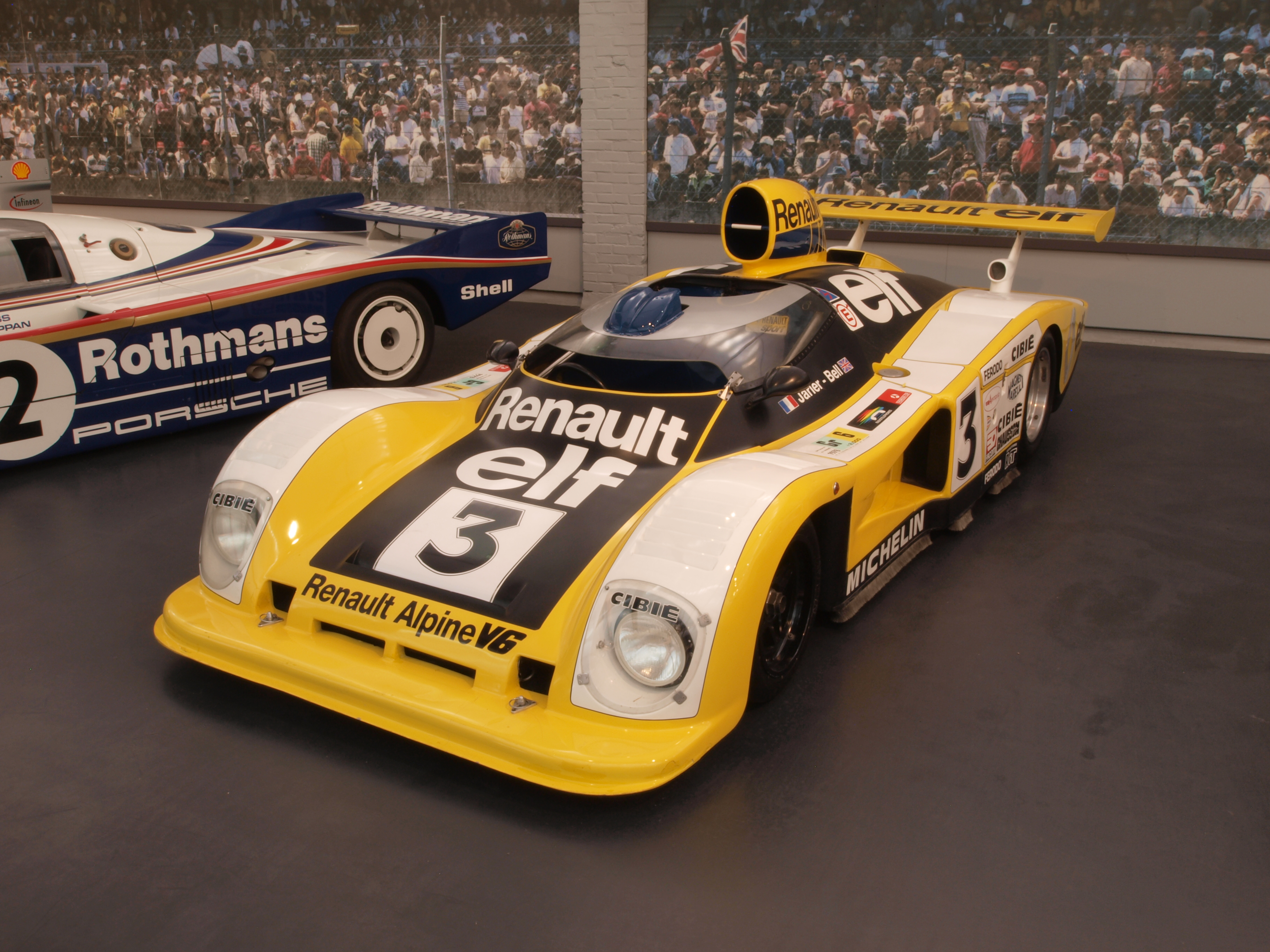
The 1978 Jarier/Bell A442A, displaying the acrylic bubble canopy introduced for the 1978 24 Hours of Le Mans race

In common with the earlier cars, the engine was suspended inside a relatively small steel spaceframe chassis, which was then clothed in a much longer fibreglass body. The extra length of the body was mostly to be found in the tail section, to improve high-speed aerodynamic efficiency, and hence top speed on the long Mulsanne straight at Circuit de la Sarthe. The bodywork was a conventional open two-seater arrangement. Designed as a "hare", to stretch their Porsche 936 rivals to breaking point, the A443 also incorporated a slightly longer wheelbase. Following wind tunnel testing during the autumn and winter of 1977, the A442B and A443 were introduced in 1978 each sporting an acrylic glass "bubble" partial roof, resulting in an additional 8 km/h (5 mph) in top speed at la Sarthe, but reducing visibility from the driving seat. However, during practice for the 1978 Le Mans race, A443 drivers Patrick Depailler and Jean-Pierre Jabouille complained that the bubble made them feel claustrophobic and trapped engine heat inside the cockpit, making driving conditions intolerable. Therefore, only the A442B ever competed with the bubble in place.

By 1978, Gérard Larrousse had moved up from works driver to manage the Renault Sport team. He laid out the team's priorities: win at Le Mans, then focus all attention on repeating the success in Formula One. Renault ploughed a huge budget into developing the A442 into a Le Mans winner. Many hours were spent in testing, particularly using long airport runways to simulate the mechanical and aerodynamic stresses induced on the long, fast Mulsanne Straight. In addition, Renault's engine department went to work on squeezing as much power out of the five-year-old powerplant as possible. Capacity was upped to 2138 cc, just short of the theoretical 2142 cc limit for turbocharged cars, and this revamped engine was installed into the new, lengthened chassis, becoming the A443.

In full qualifying trim, with the bubble roof, the A443 achieved a top speed of 236 mph (380 km/h) on the Mulsanne Straight, making it the fastest car ever produced by Renault, a record which still stands today and includes all of Renault's F1 entries.

== Race history ==
The A442 made its competition debut in March 1975, at the Mugello 1000 km, with Jabouille and Larrousse, although other sources report the car to be an A441 with the new turbo engine. Despite the relatively underdeveloped turbo addition to the Renault engine, the car lasted long enough for the team to take a surprise win in its very first race. In the 1976 Nürburgring 300 km two Renaults qualified in the front row, only to crash out in the second corner. Subsequent repeated mechanical failures meant that going into the 1976 24 Hours of Le Mans the team had failed to win another race. That run of form was not to change, and the single car entered dropped out with engine failure before half of the 24 hours had elapsed.

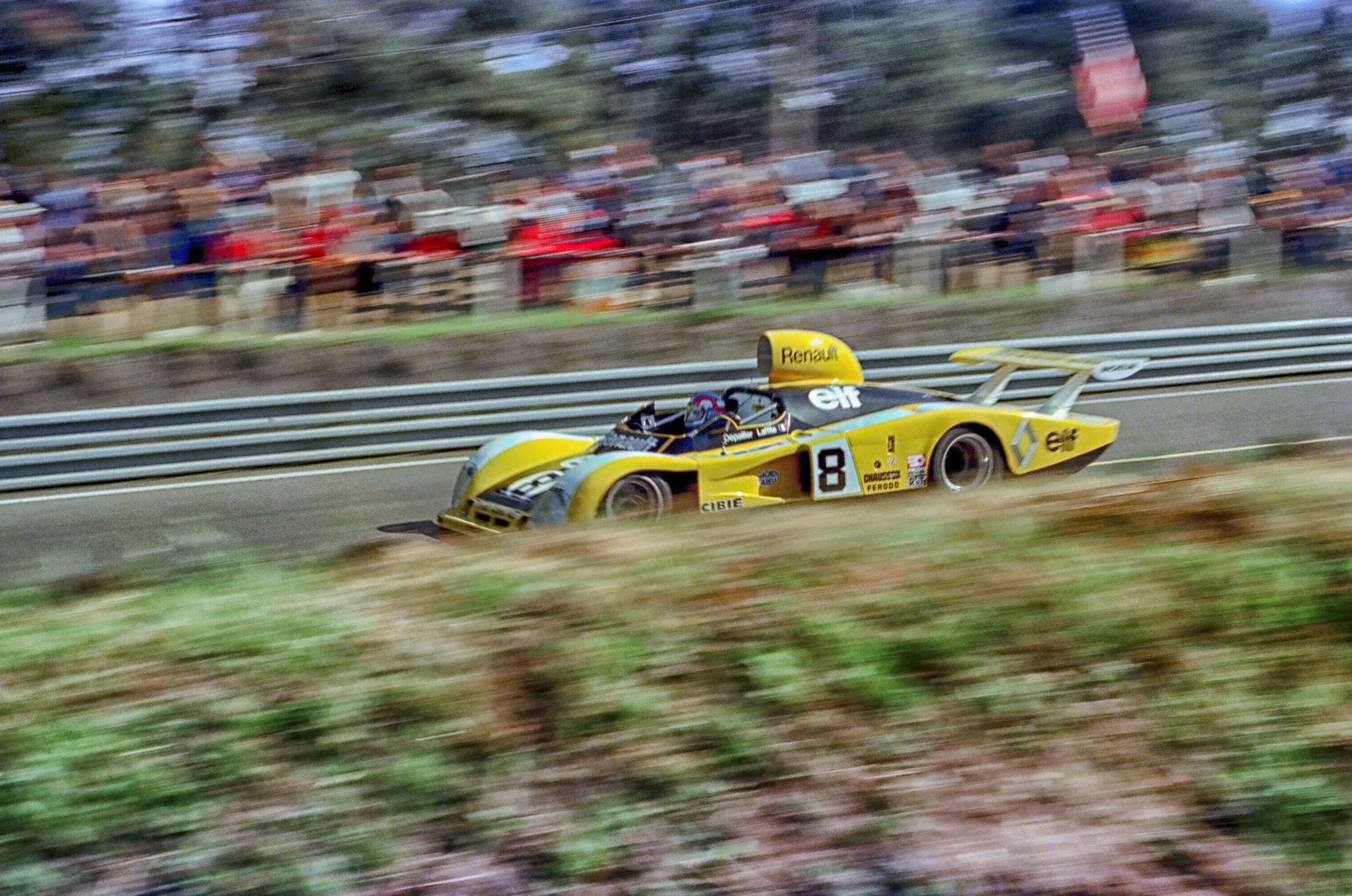
Patrick Depailler driving a Renault Alpine A442 in the 1977 24 Hours of Le Mans race

For the Renault management, success at Le Mans was a huge prestige issue. For the 1977 race the Renault Sport works team fielded three cars, drafted in endurance specialist Derek Bell, and were supported by an additional, privately entered A442. In the intervening period between the two Le Mans starts, the Renault Alpines had taken second and third places in the 500 km ACF race at Dijon-Prenois, as well as second place at the high-speed 4h Monza round. Expectation and publicity levels were high. It was therefore something of an embarrassment when not one of the four cars reached the finishing flag. Renault's yellow and black liveried squad did not compare favourably with the white Martini Racing Porsche 936 and Porsche 935. In both World Championship series of 1976, these reliable, fast cars scored repeated wins.

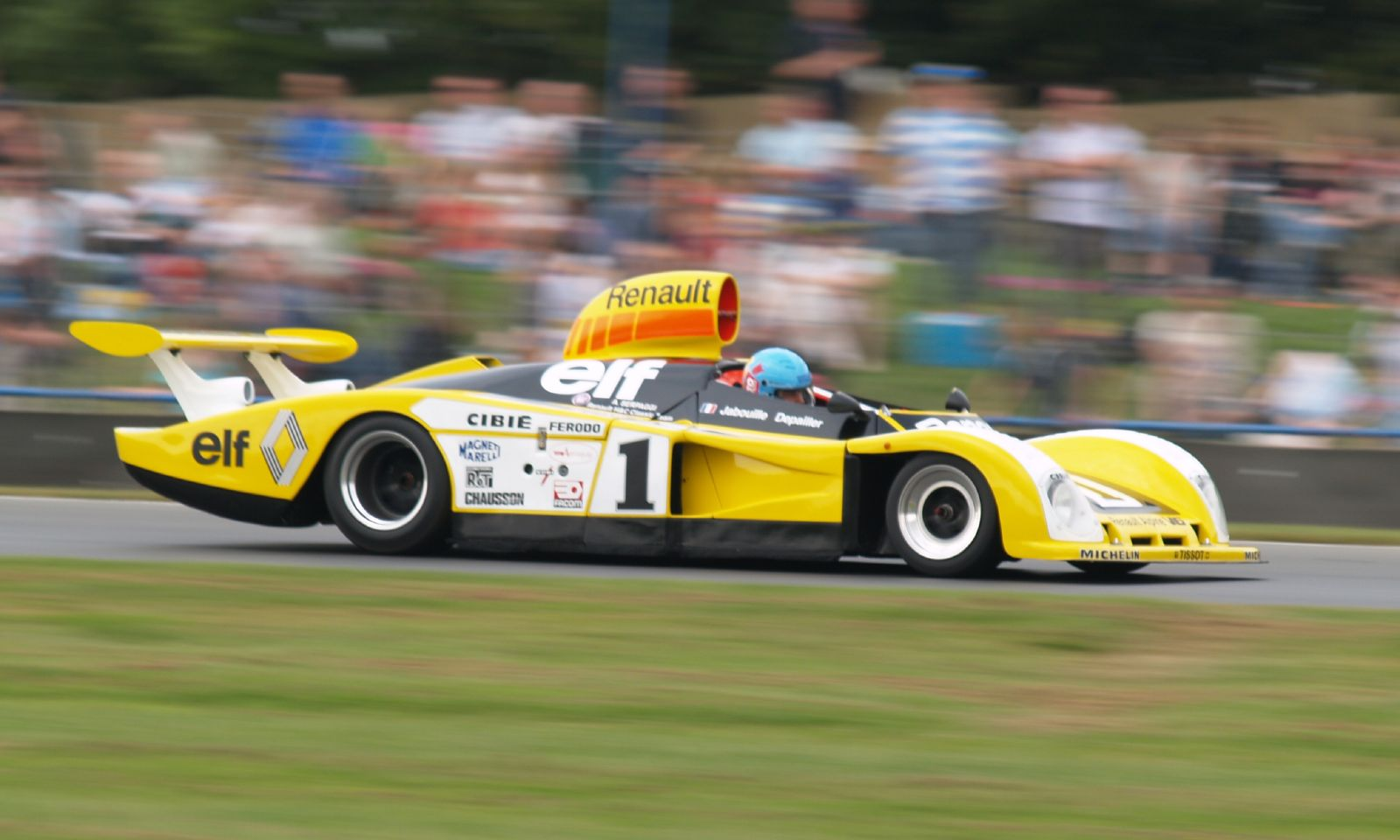
The 1978 Renault Alpine A443 being demonstrated at Donington Park in 2007

At the 1978 24 Hours of Le Mans, their huge development program paid off. Once again, the works team entered three cars: an old A442, renamed A442A; the bubble-canopied A442B; and the A443. A second A442A was entered by Ecurie Calberson. The work carried out since the 1977 race meant that, for once, Renault was on a par with the dominant Porsche 936 turbo cars, which had been improved, and the two manufacturers shared the first four rows of the grid equally. The Porsche 935/78 Moby Dick, which due to its aerodynamic layout and 800 horsepower achieved over 360 km/h on the straight, qualified third, behind the new 936 and the A443.

From the start, the A443 was the class of the field, lapping in under 3 minutes 40 seconds, while the Porsches had planned to do only 3:40 to 3:50. Jabouille took fastest lap at 3:34, which was six seconds slower than in qualifying, before the A443's engine finally broke in the 18th hour. This was the second Renault retirement, after the Bell/Jarier A442A works car had suffered transmission failure at the half-way point. However, Pironi and Jaussaud in the A442B were well placed to inherit the lead. Two 936s had technical problems, the third crashed at 11 am. The pairing held on to the lead for the final few hours, finishing four laps ahead of the second-placed Porsche. The privateer A442A also finished well, taking fourth place behind the two remaining 936s. After the final flag Pironi was too exhausted to climb up to the podium, where Jaussaud took the trophy alone.

== Complete 24 Hours of Le Mans results ==
Results in bold indicate pole position. Results in italics indicate fastest lap.

Year	Entrant	Car	Class	Drivers	No.	Laps	Pos.	Class Pos.
1976	(France) Renault Sport	Renault Alpine A442	Gp. 6 3.	(France) Didier Pironi	19	135	DNF	DNF
1976	(France) Renault Sport	Renault Alpine A442	Gp. 6 3.	(France) Guy Fréquelin	19	135	DNF	DNF
1976	(France) Renault Sport	Renault Alpine A442	Gp. 6 3.	(France) René Arnoux	19	135	DNF	DNF
1977	(France) Équipe Renault Elf	Renault Alpine A442	Gr. 6 S 3.0	(France) Patrick Tambay	7	158	DNF	DNF
1977	(France) Équipe Renault Elf	Renault Alpine A442	Gr. 6 S 3.0	(France) Jean-Pierre Jaussaud	7	158	DNF	DNF
1977	(France) Équipe Renault Elf	Renault Alpine A442	Gr. 6 S 3.0	(France) Patrick Depailler	8	289	DNF	DNF
1977	(France) Équipe Renault Elf	Renault Alpine A442	Gr. 6 S 3.0	(France) Jacques Laffite	8	289	DNF	DNF
1977	(France) Équipe Renault Elf	Renault Alpine A442	Gr. 6 S 3.0	(France) Jean-Pierre Jabouille	9	257	DNF	DNF
1977	(France) Équipe Renault Elf	Renault Alpine A442	Gr. 6 S 3.0	(United Kingdom) Derek Bell	9	257	DNF	DNF
1977	(France) J. Haran / H. de Chaunac (private entrant)	Renault Alpine A442	Gr. 6 S 3.0	(France) Didier Pironi	16	0	DNF	DNF
1977	(France) J. Haran / H. de Chaunac (private entrant)	Renault Alpine A442	Gr. 6 S 3.0	(France) René Arnoux	16	0	DNF	DNF
1977	(France) J. Haran / H. de Chaunac (private entrant)	Renault Alpine A442	Gr. 6 S 3.0	(France) Guy Fréquelin	16	0	DNF	DNF
1978	(France) Renault Sport	Renault Alpine A442B	S +2.0	(France) Didier Pironi	2	369	1st	1st
1978	(France) Renault Sport	Renault Alpine A442B	S +2.0	(France) Jean-Pierre Jaussaud	2	369	1st	1st
1978	(France) Renault Sport	Renault Alpine A442A	S +2.0	(United Kingdom) Derek Bell	3	162	DNF	DNF
1978	(France) Renault Sport	Renault Alpine A442A	S +2.0	(France) Jean-Pierre Jarier	3	162	DNF	DNF
1978	(France) Equipe Renault Elf Sport Calberson	Renault Alpine A442A	S +2.0	(France) Guy Fréquelin	4	358	4th	4th
1978	(France) Equipe Renault Elf Sport Calberson	Renault Alpine A442A	S +2.0	(France) Jean Ragnotti	4	358	4th	4th
1978	(France) Equipe Renault Elf Sport Calberson	Renault Alpine A442A	S +2.0	(France) José Dolhem	4	358	4th	4th
1978	(France) Equipe Renault Elf Sport Calberson	Renault Alpine A442A	S +2.0	(France) Jean-Pierre Jabouille	4	358	4th	4th
