= Osella PA3 =

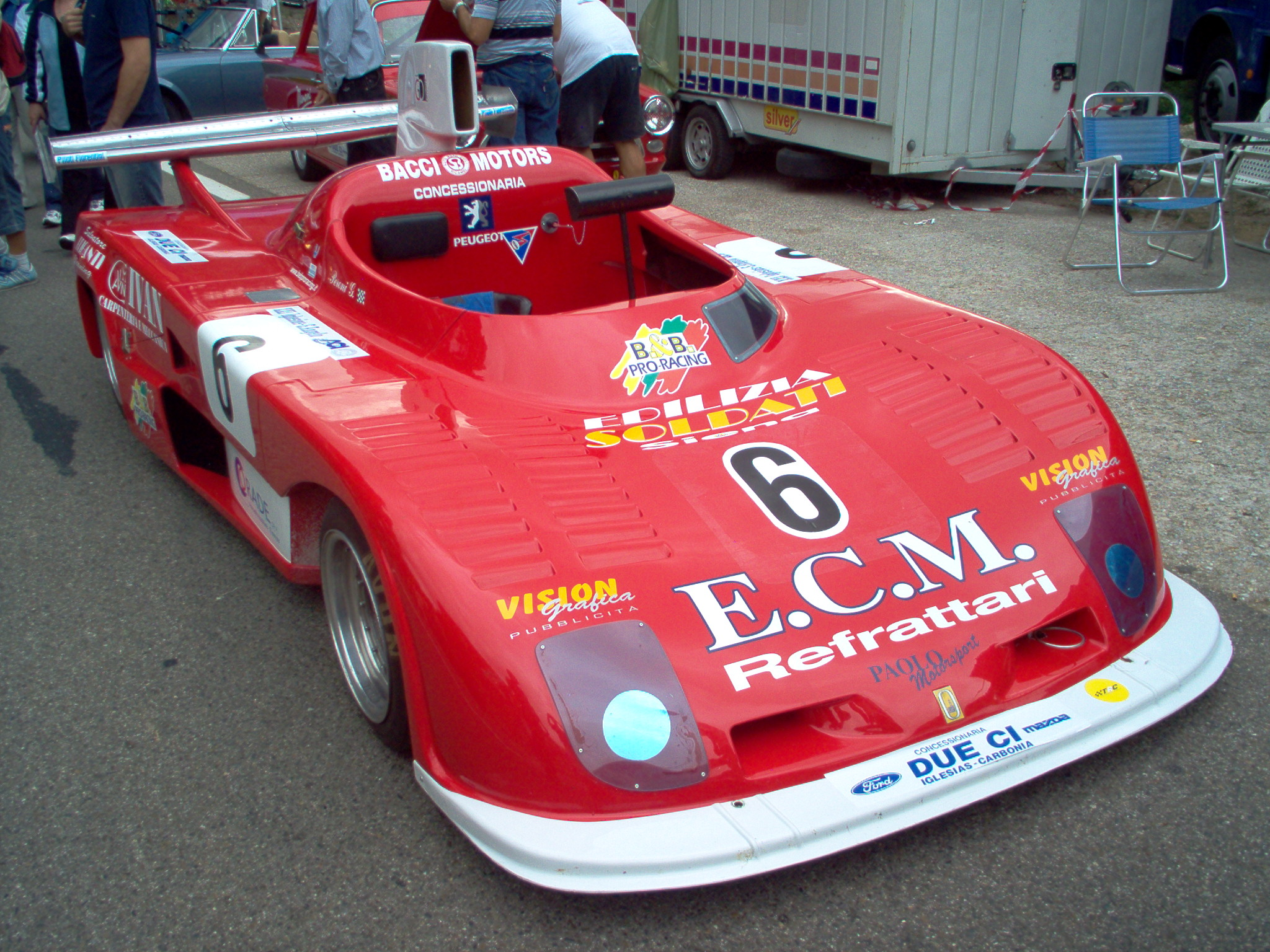
- Category: Group 6 (Sports 2000) prototype
- Designer(s): Osella
- Production: 1975-1986

Technical specifications
- Chassis: Fiberglass aluminum monocoque with steel tubular rear subframe
- Suspension (front): Double wishbones, Coil springs over Dampers, Anti-roll bar
- Suspension (rear): Single top links, twin lower links, Twin Radius arms, Coil springs over Dampers, Anti-roll bar
- Engine: Abarth twin-cam BMW M12/7 turbo Cosworth BDG; Cosworth BDH; Cosworth SCA; Cosworth FVA; Cosworth FVC inline-four Ferrari V8, 998-2000 cc
- Transmission: Hewland F.G.400 5-speed manual, rear wheel drive

Competition history
Entries	Wins	Podiums
103	13	25

The Osella PA3 is a Group 6 (Sports 2000) prototype racing car designed, developed, and built by Osella, to compete in the World Sportscar Championship sports car racing series in 1975, but was used in active competition through 1986. It was powered by a number of different engines, including the 2.0 L (120 cu in) BMW M12/7, the Abarth twin-cam engine, and the Cosworth BDG, or the 1.3 L (79 cu in) Cosworth BDH, or even the smaller 998 cc (60.9 cu in) Cosworth SCA. The 1.6 L (98 cu in) and 1.8 L (110 cu in) Cosworth FVA and Cosworth FVC were also used. It was even powered by a Ferrari 2.0 V8 engine. It scored a total of 13 wins, and 25 podiums. It was entered 103 times during its career.

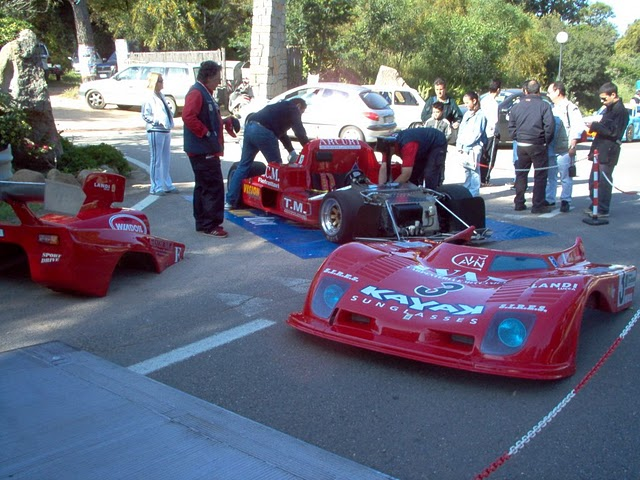

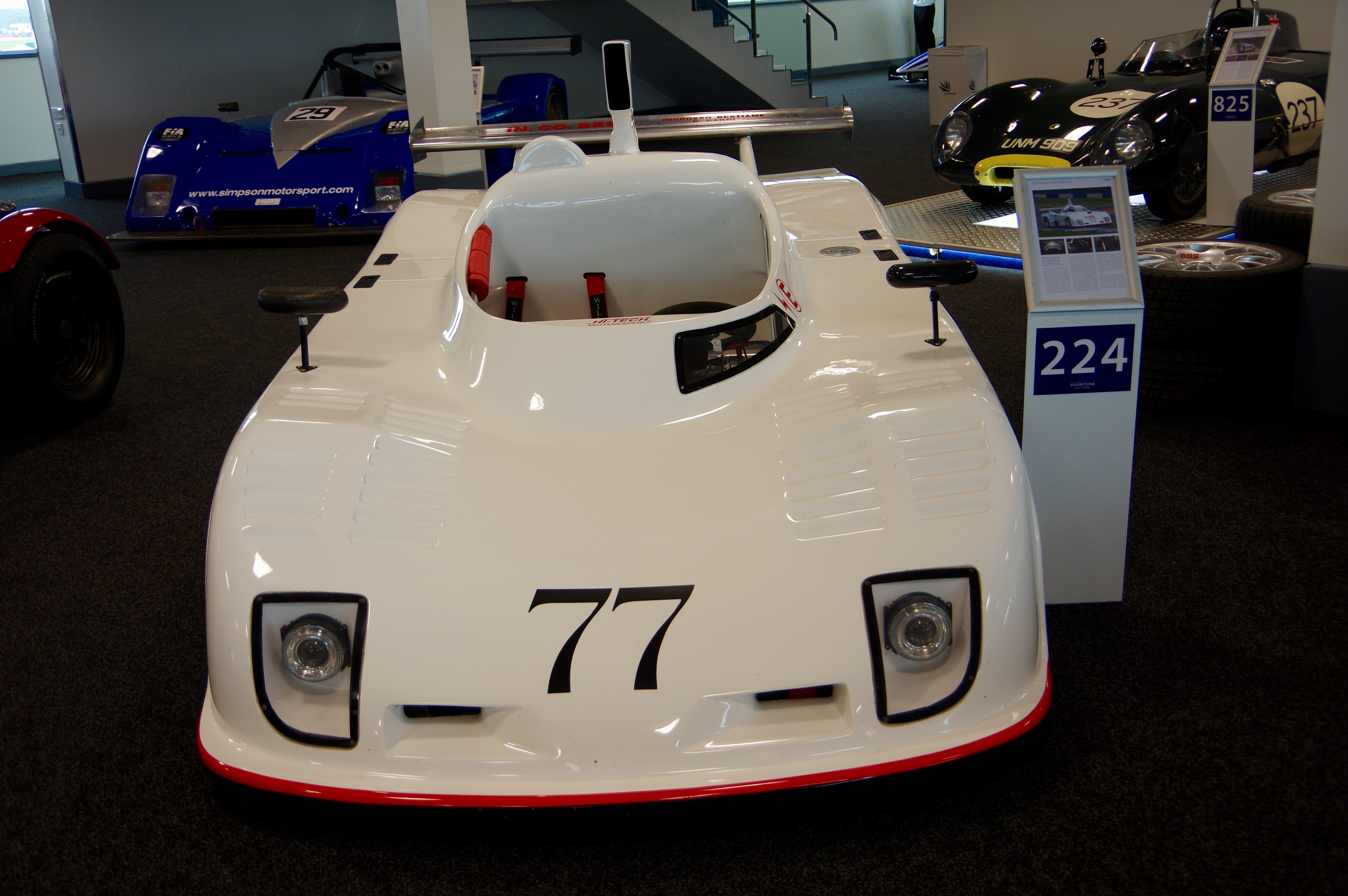
