= Abarth T140 =

Abarth T-140 6000
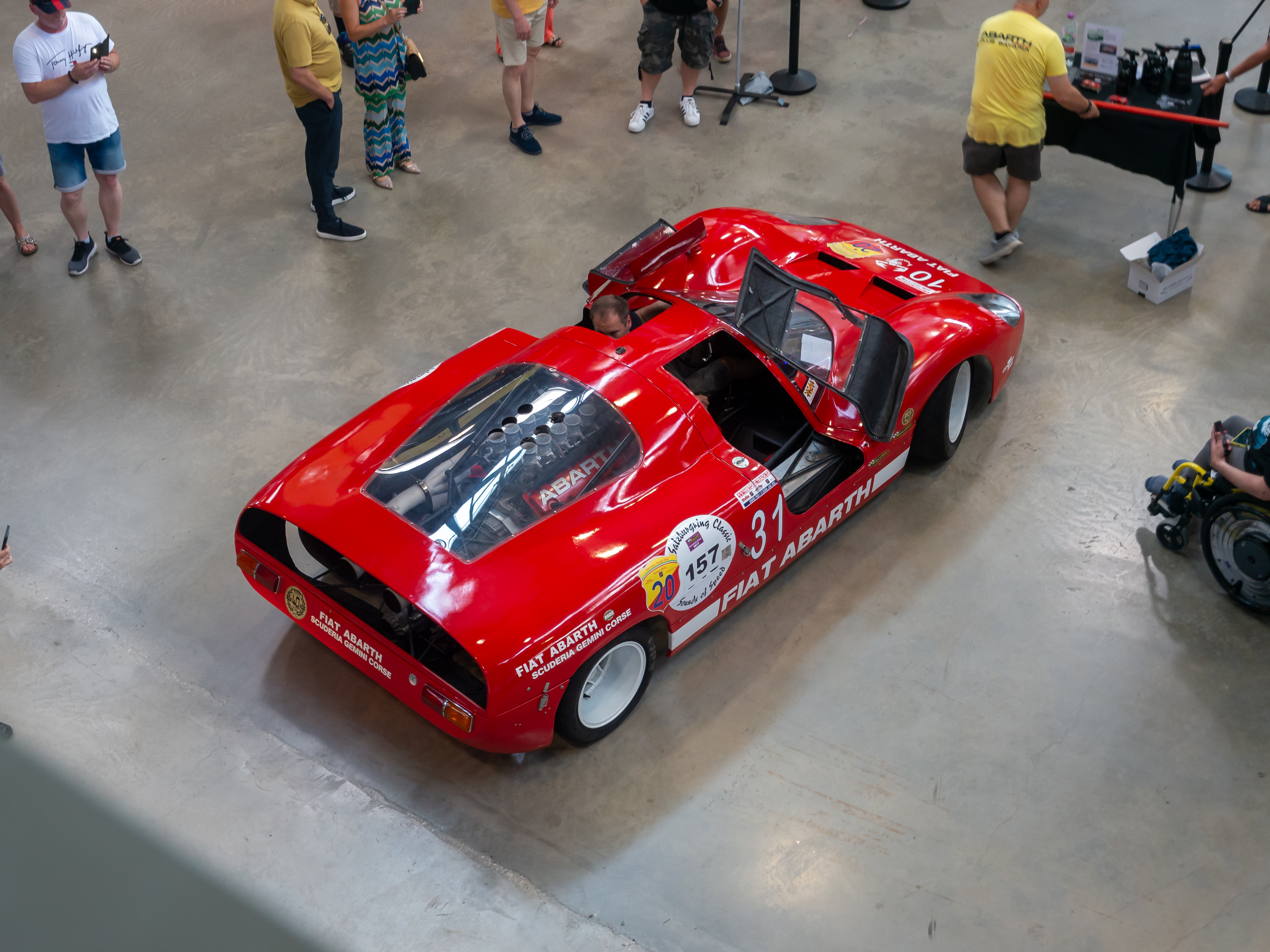

Overview
- Manufacturer: Abarth
- Production: 1967 (concept design only)
- Designer: Mario Colucci, Luchino Fochi (engine)

Body and chassis
- Class: Group 6 prototype sports car
- Layout: RMR

Powertrain
- Engine: 5,982 cc (6.0 L (370 cu in)) V12
- Transmission: 5-speed manual

Dimensions
- Wheelbase: 2,450 mm (96.5 in)
- Length: 4,100 mm (161.4 in)
- Width: 1,850 mm (72.8 in)
- Height: 1,030 mm (40.6 in)
- Curb weight: 1,110 kg (2,447 lb)

The Abarth T-140 was a stillborn conceptual 6-liter, mid-engined Group 6 prototype sports car designed by Abarth in the late 1960's, but never produced. This was due to a change in the rules and regulations for 1967 imposed by the CSI, limiting the capacity of the large Group 6 sport-prototype cars to 3 liters, in an attempt to curtail and control the growing speed and power.

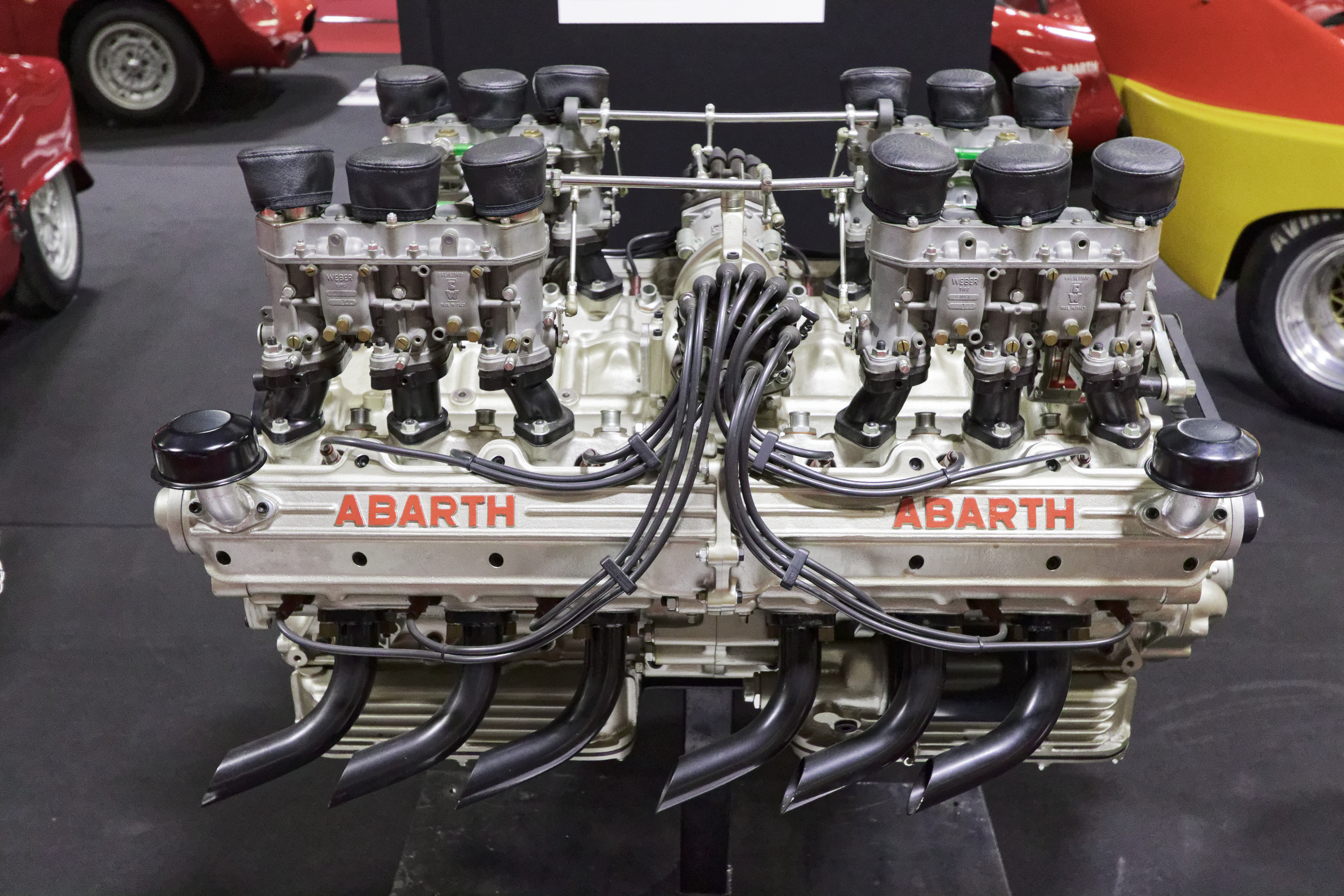
The original engine.
