= TOJ SC304 =

Sports prototype race car

- Category: Group 6
- Constructor: Team Obermoser Jörg
- Designer(s): Jörg Obermoser

Technical specifications
- Chassis: fibreglass body on aluminium monocoque, front and rear subframes
- Suspension (front): double wishbones, coil springs over dampers, anti-roll bar
- Suspension (rear): single top links, twin lower links, twin trailing arms, coil springs over dampers, anti-roll bar
- Engine: Ford-Cosworth DFV 3.0 L (183 cu in) naturally-aspirated V8 mid-engined, longitudinally mounted
- Transmission: Hewland 5-speed manual
- Weight: 720 kg (1,590 lb)
- Tyres: Goodyear

Competition history
- Debut: 1976 Nürburgring 300 Kilometres
Races	Wins	Podiums	Poles
24	3	9	1

The TOJ SC304 is a sports prototype race car, designed, developed and built by German racing team and constructor, Team Obermoser Jörg; conforming to the FIA's Group 6 category and specification of motor racing, in 1976. Over its career, spanning two years, it won one race, scored three podium finishes, and took one pole position. It was powered by a naturally-aspirated 3.0 L (180 cu in) Ford-Cosworth DFV V8 engine, producing 445 hp (332 kW).
