= Group 6 (motorsport) =

FIA classification for sports car racing

Group 6 was the official designation applied by the FIA to two motor racing classifications, the Prototype-Sports Car category from 1966 to 1971 and the Two-Seater Racing Cars class from 1976 to 1982.

== Group 6 Prototype-Sports Cars (1966 to 1971) ==
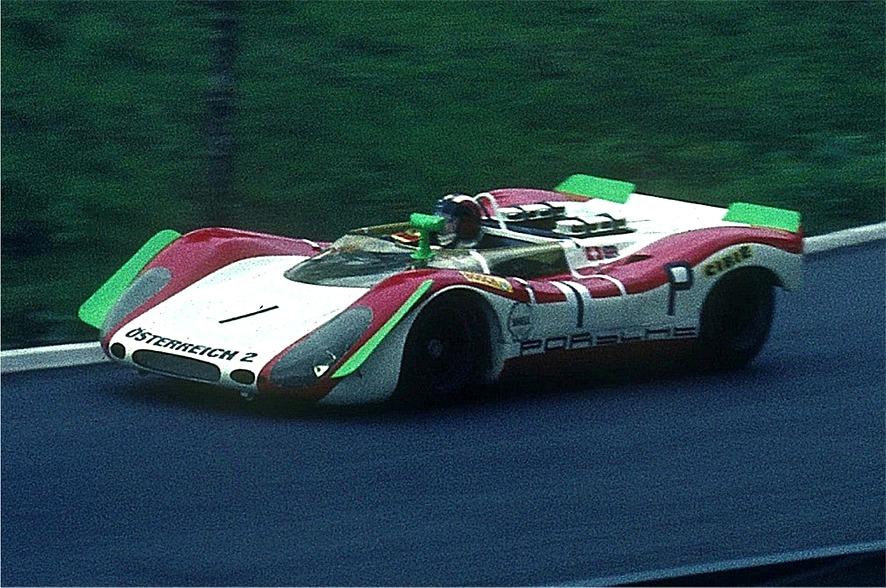
Porsche won the 1969 International Championship for Makes with the Group 6 Porsche 908

The original Group 6 was introduced for the 1966 racing season, at the same time as a new Group 4 Sports Car category. Whilst Group 4 specified that competing cars must be one of at least fifty examples built, Group 6 had no minimum production requirement. Nor did it have a maximum engine capacity limit although there were weight, dimensional and other restrictions placed on the Group 6 cars. The Prototypes and Sports Cars categories each had their own international championships to fight for but many of the major international endurance races such as the 24 Hours of Le Mans would count as qualifying rounds for both championships.

1968 saw a three-litre engine capacity limit imposed on the Group 6 category and the dual championship format was replaced by a single International Championship for Makes open to both Group 6 and Group 4 cars. The Le Mans 24 Hour retained its place as a championship round. For 1969 the FIA relaxed a number of Group 6 regulations relating to weight, spare wheel, windscreen height and luggage space requirements.

For 1972 the Group 6 Prototype-Sports Car class was redesignated and renamed to become the Group 5 Sports Car category. The International Championship of Makes became the World Championship of Makes and the first chapter of Group 6 history was brought to a close by the FIA.

Group 6 cars had been eligible to compete in 24 Hours of Le Mans each year from 1966 to 1971; however, the category had produced the outright winning car only in 1966 and 1967.

== Group 6 Two-Seater Racing Cars (1976 to 1982) ==
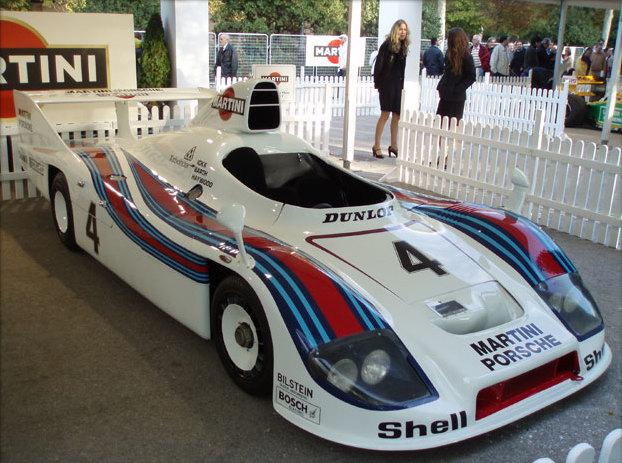
Porsche won the 1976 World Sportscar Championship with the Group 6 Porsche 936. The type also won the Le Mans 24 Hour in 1976, '77 & '81 and was runner up in '78 & '80, while in '79 a Group 5 Porsche 935 won.

In 1976, the FIA reintroduced the Group 6 classification, now officially called “Two- Seater Racing Cars”.

Various production-based categories, spearheaded by a new Group 5 for “Special Production Cars”, were now to contest the World Championship of Makes whilst the Group 6 cars were awarded their own title, the World Championship for Sports Cars. Three engine capacity limits were applied to Group 6 cars for the 1976 and 1977 championships:

- 5000cc for cars fitted with engines using a production car block
- 3000cc for cars fitted with naturally aspirated racing engines
- 2140cc for cars fitted with turbocharged racing engines (capacity equivalence factor of 1.4)

After two years of small fields and little in the way of manufacturer support the championship was downgraded to become the European Sports Car Championship for 1978 but even that title was to be abandoned after the first year. From 1979 the FIA decreed that Group 6 cars could compete in the World Championship of Makes qualifying rounds but continued to allow only production-based cars to score championship points for their manufacturer.

1981 saw the series expanded with an official Drivers’ title awarded by the FIA for the first time and drivers of Group 6 cars were eligible to compete for this. Group 6 was then effectively replaced by the new Group C Sports Car class for 1982 but the FIA granted a concession which allowed the Group 6 cars to compete in the 1982 World Endurance Championship alongside the new cars. As in 1981, drivers of Group 6 cars were eligible to score points in the Drivers’ championship but the relevant manufacturers could not score points towards the Makes title. For the 1982 World Endurance Championship, the engine capacity maximum for Group 6 cars was set at 3000cc.

Throughout the seven years of the second era of Group 6 racing cars being eligible to compete in the 24 Hours of Le Mans, starting from 1976, the category had produced the outright winning car in all years except 1979, when in heavy rain several 911-based Group 5 Porsche 935 were on top, and in the final 1982, when the new Group C Porsche 956 started its dominance. Before that, the Porsche 936 won three times (1976, 1977 and 1981) with Renault in 1978 and Rondeau in 1980 scoring wins for France.

== List of Group 6 Cars ==
Brand	Chassis	Image	Debut	Applications	Notes
Abarth	T140		1967	1st Generation	Concept only, never raced.
Alfa Romeo	33SC12		1976	2nd Generation	
Alfa Romeo	T33/2		1967	1st Generation	
Alfa Romeo	T/33/TT/12		1973	2nd Generation	
Alfa Romeo	Tipo 33		1966	1st Generation	Later versions would compete in Groups 4, and 5.
Alpine	A210		1967	1st Generation	
Alpine	A220		1968	1st Generation	
Alpine	A442		1976	2nd Generation	
Alpine	A442B		1978	2nd Generation	
Alpine	A443		1978	2nd Generation	
Alpine	M65		1966	1st Generation	
Chaparral	2D		1966	1st Generation	
Chaparral	2F		1967	1st Generation	
Chevron	B19		1971	1st Generation	
Chevron	B21		1972	2nd Generation	
Chevron	B26		1973	2nd Generation	
Chevron	B31		1975	2nd Generation	
Chevron	B36		1976	2nd Generation	
Ferrari	312 P		1969	1st Generation	
Ferrari	312 PB		1971	1st Generation	Would later be reassigned to Group 5.
Ferrari	330 P		1964	1st Generation	
Ferrari	330 P2		1965	1st Generation	
Ferrari	330 P3		1966	1st Generation	
Ferrari	330 P4		1966	1st Generation	
Fiat Abarth	1000SP		1968	1st Generation	
Ford	GT40 Mk II		1966	1st Generation	Earlier version competed in Group 4.
Ford	GT40 Mark IV		1967	1st Generation	Earlier version competed in Group 4.
Ford	P68		1968	1st Generation	
Ford	P69		1969	1st Generation	
Hesketh	308LM				
Howmet	TX		1968	1st Generation	
Jaguar	XJ13		1966	1st Generation	
Lancia	LC1		1982	2nd Generation	
Ligier	JS3		1971	1st Generation	
Lola	T210		1970	1st Generation	
Lola	T212		1970	1st Generation	
Lola	T294		1974	2nd Generation	
Lola	T296		1976	2nd Generation	
Lola	T297		1977	2nd Generation	
Lola	T298		1979	2nd Generation	
Lola	T600		1981	2nd Generation	
Lotus	62		1969	1st Generation	
March	75S		1975	2nd Generation	
March	76S		1976	2nd Generation	
March	77S		1977	2nd Generation	
Marcos	Marcos Mantis XP		1967	1st Generation	
Matra	MS620		1966	1st Generation	
Matra	MS650		1969	1st Generation	
Matra	MS660		1970	1st Generation	
Mirage	GR7		1974	2nd Generation	
Mirage	GR8		1975	2nd Generation	
Mirage	M1		1967	1st Generation	
Mirage	M2		1968	1st Generation	
Mirage	M3		1969	1st Generation	
Mirage	M8		1976	2nd Generation	
Mirage	M9		1978	2nd Generation	
Mirage	M10		1979	2nd Generation	
Mooncraft	Shiden 77		1977	2nd Generation	
Osella	PA3		1975	2nd Generation	
Osella	PA4		1976	2nd Generation	
Osella	PA5		1977	2nd Generation	
Osella	PA6		1978	2nd Generation	
Osella	PA7		1979	2nd Generation	
Osella	PA8		1980	2nd Generation	
Osella	PA9		1981	2nd Generation	
Porsche	906		1966	1st Generation	Later versions would compete in Group 4.
Porsche	907		1967	1st Generation	
Porsche	907 LH		1967	1st Generation	
Porsche	908		1966	1st Generation	A later version would compete in Group 5.
Porsche	908/02		1969	1st Generation	
Porsche	908/03		1970	1st Generation	
Porsche	910		1967	1st Generation	
Porsche	936		1976	2nd Generation	
Prince	R380		1966	1st Generation	
Rondeau	Inaltéra GTP		1976	2nd Generation	
Rondeau	M378		1978	2nd Generation	
Rondeau	M379		1979	2nd Generation	
Sauber	C5		1975	2nd Generation	
TOJ	SC204		1976	2nd Generation	
TOJ	SC205		1977	2nd Generation	
TOJ	SC206		1978	2nd Generation	
TOJ	SC302		1977	2nd Generation	
TOJ	SC303		1977	2nd Generation	
TOJ	SC304		1977	2nd Generation	

== Groups 1-9 ==
Categories and Groups of Appendix J 1954 - 1965
Categories	1954	1955	1956	1957	1958	1959	1960	1961	1962	1963	1964	1965
Categories	I. Touring						A. Touring					
Categories	II. Sports				II. Grand Touring		B. Grand Touring					
Categories	-						C. Sports					
Group	1954	1955	1956	1957	1958	1959	1960	1961	1962	1963	1964	1965
Group 1	Normal series production											
Group 2	"Grand Touring" series prod				Modified series prod		Modified series prod					
Group 3	Special series production						Grand Touring Cars					
Group 4	Series production				Normal GT series prod		Sports Car					
Group 5	International				Modified GT series prod		-					
Group 6	-				GT specials		-					

Categories and Groups of Appendix J 1966 - 1981 (Production requirement)
Categories	1966	1967	1968	1969	1970	1971	1972	1973	1974	1975	1976	1977	1978	1979	1980	1981
Categories	A. Production															
Categories	B. Special				B. Experimental Competition						B. Racing Cars					
Categories	C. Racing Cars										-					
Group	1966	1967	1968	1969	1970	1971	1972	1973	1974	1975	1976	1977	1978	1979	1980	1981
Group 1	Series Touring (5000)															
Group 2	Touring (1000)				Special Touring (1000)											
Group 3	Grand Touring (500)				Series Grand Touring (1000)											
Group 4	Sportscars (50/25)				Special Grand Touring (500)						Grand Touring (400)					
Group 5	Special Touring Cars				Sports cars (25)		Sports cars				Special cars derived from Groups 1-4					
Group 6	Prototype sportscars						-				Two-seater racecars					
Group 7	Two-seater racecars										International formula					
Group 8	Formula racing cars						International formula				Formula libre racing cars					
Group 9	Formula libre racing cars										-					
Source: Note: Special may be replaced with Competition in some official documents.
