= Jakob Bührer =

- Born: 8 November 1882; Zürich
- Died: 22 November 1975 (aged 93); Locarno
- Occupations: Journalist, author
- Writing career
- Notable works: Im roten Feld (1938, 1944 and 1951)

Jakob Bührer (8 November 1882 – 22 November 1975) was a Swiss journalist and writer.

In his work Bührer focuses on victims of social processes such as the economic crisis of the 1930s in Switzerland. The unfinished trilogy, Im roten Feld (1938, 1944 and 1951), is considered as Bührer's literary masterpiece; it tells Swiss literary history during the French Revolution. He also wrote for social democratic periodicals such as the Rote Revue.

Part of his literary estate is archived in the Swiss Literary Archives
