= Nicolas Bührer =

Swiss racecar driver

Nicolas Claude Bührer (born 14 February 1944, Biel, Switzerland) is a Swiss entrepreneur and former car racing driver.

== Career ==
Bührer is co-owner and long-time managing director of Bührer & Co. AG, a construction company founded in 1937, which also sells and repairs construction machinery. A connection between Nicolas Bührer's family and Bührer Traktorenfabrik AG in Hinwil cannot be deduced from the available sources.

== Career as a racing driver ==
Bührer was active in the sports car scene as a driver in the 1970s and 1980s and currently competes in hill climbs with historic racing cars in a Porsche 911 Carrera RSR and a BMW M1. In 1981, he and Angelo Pallavicini won the Hockenheim 3-hour race in a Porsche 934. He competed in the German racing championship in 1974, the Spa-Francorchamps 24-hour race in 1975 and Le Mans in 1976.
