= Porsche 936 =

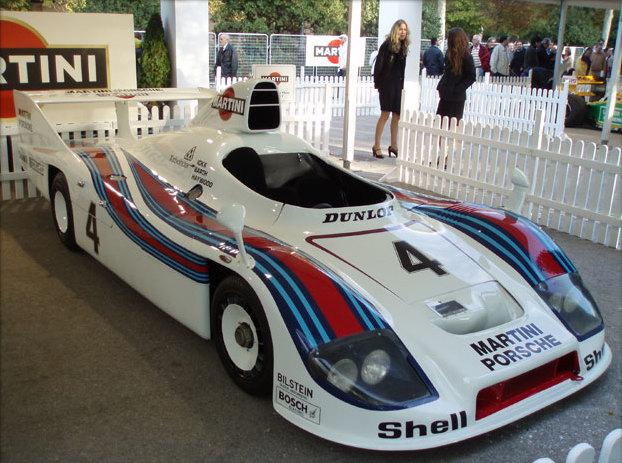
- Porsche 936/77-001, Le Mans winner 1977

Overview
- Manufacturer: Porsche AG
- Designer: Norbert Singer

Body and chassis
- Class: Racing car
- Body style: Spyder
- Layout: Rear mid-engine, rear-wheel-drive

Powertrain
- Engine: 2.14 L Turbo Flat 6 12v 2.14 L Turbo Flat 6 24v 2.65 L Turbo Flat 6 24v

Chronology
- Predecessor: Porsche 917; Porsche 908
- Successor: Porsche 956

The Porsche 936 is a Group 6 sports prototype racing car introduced in 1975 by Porsche as a delayed successor to the 917, a five-litre Group 5 Sports Car, and the 908, a three-litre Group 6 Prototype-Sports Car, both of which were retired by the factory after 1971. Its name came from using a variant of the Porsche 930's turbocharged engine, as well as competing in Group 6 racing.

== History ==
The Porsche 936 was built to compete in the World Sportscar Championship as well as the 1976 24 Hours of Le Mans under the Group 6 formula and won both races. Chassis 002 with #20 won with Jacky Ickx and Gijs van Lennep at Le Mans, while the #18 chassis 001 of Reinhold Joest and Jürgen Barth had engine failure. It shared these victories with its production-based sibling, the Porsche 935 which won in Group 5. The open top, two seater spyder was powered by an air-cooled, two-valve 540 hp (403 kW) single-turbocharger flat-6 engine with 2140 cc, or the equivalent of 3000 cc including the 1.4 handicap factor. The spaceframe chassis was based on the 917, with many of the parts also coming from that car. In the first outings, the Martini Racing car was still black, and the engine cover behind the roll bar was flat. The large hump and the air box above the engine was fitted onto the car later in the season. It is not for the air intake of the turbocharged engine, nor for cooling of the air-cooled engine itself, but instead mainly used for the intercooler.

=== 936/81 ===
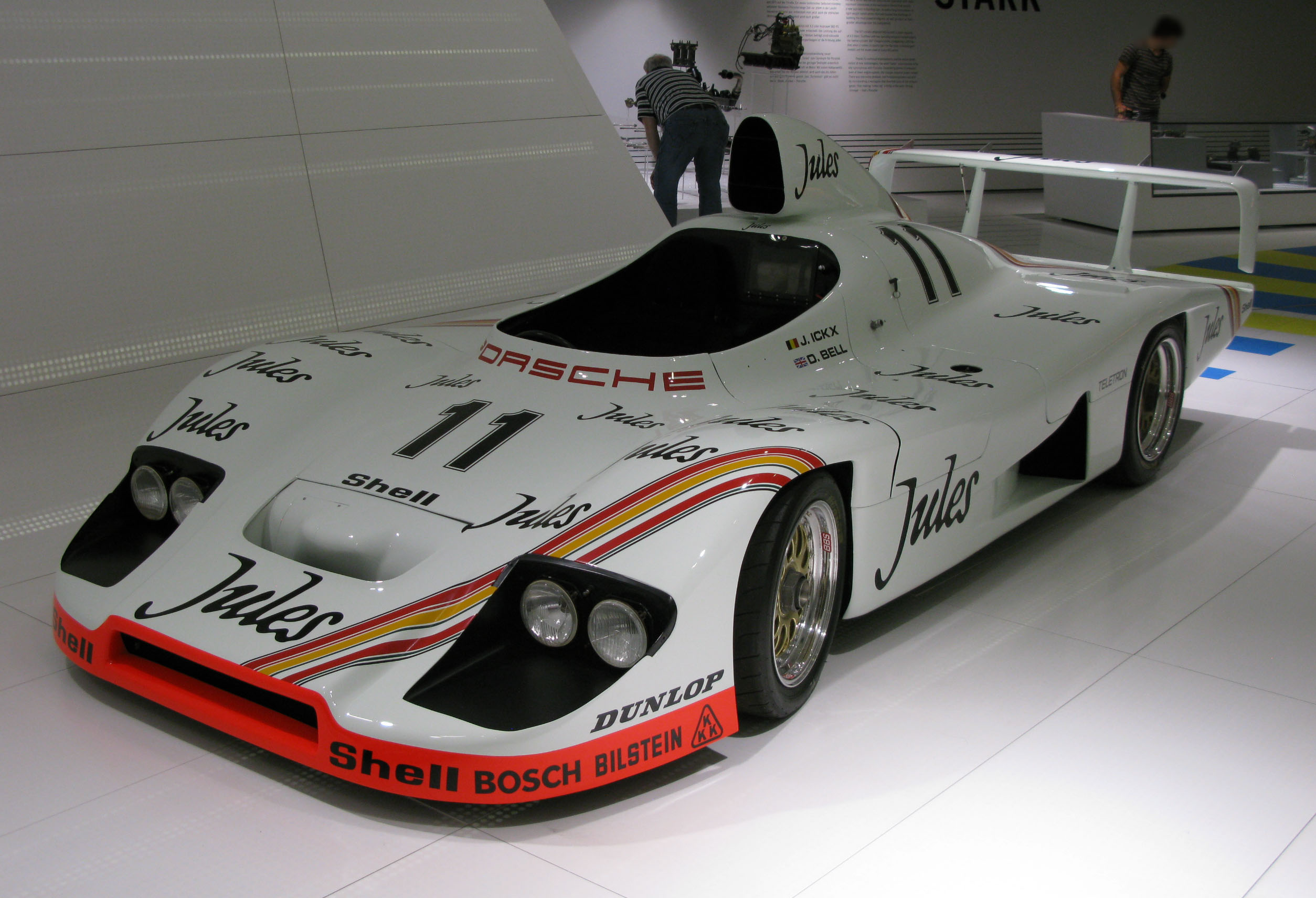
Porsche 936/81, winner of Le Mans 24 Hours in 1981 driven by Jacky Ickx and Derek Bell

For 1981, Porsche was planning to enter the 49th 24 Hours of Le Mans with modified 924s, which had no hopes of winning. This didn't sit well with Porsche's new CEO Peter Schutz, who insisted that Porsche enter with a car capable of winning or not at all. Porsche engineer Peter Falk suggested an Indy engine developed but never used due to new US regulations, which would have made it uncompetitive for the Indy series, however, it could have been competitive in a sports car chassis, so it was approved by Porsche's engineering chief Helmuth Bott, also it provided an opportunity to test the engine for the 956. This engine can produce 900 hp in Indycar. Porsche withdraw from formula racing in USA before the first race as their engine was considered too powerful and Porsche was not interested in lowering the boost pressure. It was lowered, though, for the endurance racing when the 2.65-litre engine was installed in the Le Mans car. The power was decreased by around thirty percent, now with just 640 hp. Instead of the 5-speed gearbox, a stronger 4-speed unit was used together with the 2.65-litre engine. A few 936s were pulled out of the Porsche museum in Stuttgart, redesigned to create the 936/81 and entered as 2 official works entries for the 1981 Le Mans 24 Hours. Jacky Ickx was coaxed out of retirement, and at the Belgian's request got Briton Derek Bell as his teammate for the race, which they then won, with the Mass/Schuppan/Haywood sister car retiring. Porsche engineers provided some unofficial support to very good customers, though, and Joest managed to get a spare chassis (004) and parts to assemble a car which was in 1980 designated as Porsche 908/80 and entered privately by Joest Racing. The Martini Racing Liqui Moly backed car took second at Le Mans in 1980. Kremer received blueprints to recreate a modified '81-spec car dubbed chassis 005 for 1982.

The successor Porsche 956 was introduced in 1982 after the new 2650 cc engine designed for Indycar was tested in the 1981 winning chassis 003 which was sponsored by Jules, a Christian Dior fragrance for men. At the inaugural year of the new Group C formula which the 956 was built for, privateer teams such as Kremer Racing and Joest Racing had to wait until 1983 for their 956. Thus, in an attempt to conform to the new Group C regulations, both teams built new bodyshapes that incorporated a roof onto their 936-replicas. Joest's car was designated as 936C JR005 while Kremer's car became known as the CK5 01.

=== Summary ===
From 1976 to 1981, the factory entered Porsche 936 won the 24 Hours of Le Mans three times with Jacky Ickx ('76, '77, '81), thus each of the three original chassis won once. In 1978, the two previously winning chassis, one of which (the 936/78) had been given a developed version of the 935 engine came second and third behind the Renault, while the pole-setting new chassis 003 crashed out. Porsche did not intend to sell the 936 to customers, wanting them instead to use the 935 (which occupied the first four places at Le Mans in 1979), and the old 908 which were still around, updated to turbo engines and new 936-like aerodynamics. In 1979, a half-hearted Essex-sponsored Le Mans entry with two 936 was a failure, and the car also crashed at Silverstone.

== Literature ==
- Lothar Boschen/Jürgen Barth: Das große Buch der Porschetypen, Motorbuch Verlag, Stuttgart 1994, ISBN 3-613-01284-7
- Schneider, Peter: Typenkompass Porsche. Renn- und Rennsportwagen seit 1948, Motorbuch Verlag, Stuttgart 2003, ISBN 3-613-02300-8
