= Monza Biennial III =

Overview
- BIE-class: Triennial exposition
- Name: Monza Biennial III
- Motto: International Exhibition of Decorative Arts
- Building(s): Royal Villa of Monza
- Organized by: Istituto Superiore per le Industrie Artistiche

Participant(s)
- Countries: 8

Location
- Country: Italy
- City: Monza
- Coordinates: 45.593437°N 9.274183°E

Timeline
- Opening: 31 May 1927
- Closure: 16 October 1927

Triennial expositions
- Previous: Monza Biennial II in Monza
- Next: Monza Biennial IV in Monza

The Milan Biennial III was the third edition of the Monza Biennial, and the last to focus on ceramics, graphics and the decorative arts, before expanding scope to include architecture. This, and the other 3 biennials, were organised by the Istituto Superiore per le Industrie Artistiche (ISIA) to provide an arts vision for the new Kingdom of Italy. It was called the International Exhibition of Decorative Arts.

It was held in Monza at the Royal Villa of Monza, and ran from 31 May to 16 October 1927.

After 4 biennials the timing was changed to every three years to form the Milan Triennials.
