= Monza Circuit =

Race track in Italy

The Temple of Speed

- Modern Grand Prix Circuit (2000–present)
- Location: Monza, Italy
- Coordinates: 45°37′14″N 9°17′22″E
- Capacity: 118,865
- FIA Grade: 1
- Owner: Communes of Monza & Milan
- Operator: SIAS S.p.A.
- Broke ground: 15 May 1922; 104 years ago
- Opened: 3 September 1922; 104 years ago
- Architect: Alfredo Rosselli
- Former names: Autodromo Nazionale di Monza (1964-1974, 1983–present); Autodromo di Monza (1928–1964, 1975–1982); Circuito di Milano (1922–1927)
- Major events: Current: Formula One; Italian Grand Prix (1950–1979, 1981–present); GT World Challenge Europe (2013–2019, 2021, 2023–2026); FIA WEC and predecessors 6 Hours of Monza (1949–1988, 1990–1992, 1995–2001, 2003–2005, 2007–2008, 2021–2023, 2026); Former: Grand Prix motorcycle racing Italian motorcycle Grand Prix (1949–1968, 1970–1971, 1973, 1981, 1983, 1986–1987); TCR World Tour (2025); World SBK (1990, 1992–1993, 1995–2013); FIM EWC (1964–1965, 1985, 1987); Monza Rally Show (1978–2000, 2003–2021, 2023–2024); WTCC Race of Italy (2005–2008, 2010–2013, 2017); Race of Two Worlds (1957–1958)
- Website: https://www.monzanet.it

Modern Grand Prix Circuit (2000–present)
- Surface: Asphalt
- Length: 5.793 km (3.600 mi)
- Turns: 11
- Race lap record: 1:20.901 (257.781 km/h (160.178 mph)) ( (United Kingdom) Lando Norris, McLaren MCL39, 2025, F1)

Motorcycle Circuit (2010–present)
- Surface: Asphalt
- Length: 5.777 km (3.590 mi)
- Turns: 11
- Race lap record: 1:42.229 ( (United Kingdom) Tom Sykes, Kawasaki Ninja ZX-10R, 2013, World SBK)

Junior Course (1959–present)
- Surface: Asphalt
- Length: 2.405 km (1.494 mi)
- Turns: 4
- Race lap record: 0:54.300 ( (Italy) Giorgio Schön, Porsche 934/76, 1976, Group 5)

Grand Prix Circuit (1996–1999)
- Surface: Asphalt
- Length: 5.770 km (3.585 mi)
- Turns: 14
- Race lap record: 1:24.808 ( (Finland) Mika Häkkinen, McLaren MP4/12, 1997, F1)

Grand Prix Circuit (1994–1995)
- Surface: Asphalt
- Length: 5.834 km (3.625 mi)
- Turns: 14
- Race lap record: 1:24.808 ( (United Kingdom) Damon Hill, Williams FW16B, 1994, F1)

Grand Prix Circuit (1976–1993)
- Surface: Asphalt
- Length: 5.800 km (3.604 mi)
- Turns: 14
- Race lap record: 1:23.575 ( (United Kingdom) Damon Hill, Williams FW15C, 1993, F1)

Grand Prix Circuit (1974–1976)
- Surface: Asphalt
- Length: 5.780 km (3.592 mi)
- Turns: 11
- Race lap record: 1:29.600 ( (France) Jean-Pierre Jarier, Renault Alpine A442, 1976, Group 6)

Grand Prix Circuit (1972–1973)
- Surface: Asphalt
- Length: 5.775 km (3.588 mi)
- Turns: 11
- Race lap record: 1:21.900 ( (France) François Cevert, Matra-Simca MS670, 1973, Group 5)

Grand Prix Circuit (1955–1959, 1962–1971) Motorcycle Circuit (1955–1973)
- Surface: Asphalt
- Length: 5.750 km (3.573 mi)
- Turns: 7
- Race lap record: 1:23.800 ( (France) Henri Pescarolo, March 711, 1971, F1)

Oval (1955–1971)
- Surface: Concrete/Asphalt
- Length: 4.250 km (2.641 mi)
- Turns: 2
- Banking: ≈30°
- Race lap record: 0:54.000 (283.34 km/h (176.06 mph)) ( (United States) Bob Veith, Bowes Seal Fast Special, 1958, IndyCar)

Combined Course (1955–1971)
- Surface: Asphalt/Concrete
- Length: 10.000 km (6.214 mi)
- Turns: 9
- Race lap record: 2:43.600 (223.02 km/h (138.58 mph)) ( (United States) Phil Hill, Ferrari 246 F1, 1960, F1)

Grand Prix Circuit (1948–1954)
- Length: 6.300 km (3.915 mi)
- Turns: 7
- Race lap record: 1:56.200 ( (Italy) Giuseppe Farina, Alfa Romeo 159M, 1951, F1)

Florio Circuit (1938–1949)
- Length: 6.993 km (4.345 mi)
- Turns: 17
- Race lap record: 2:34.200 ( (Germany) Hermann Lang, Mercedes-Benz W154, 1938, GP)

Florio Circuit with Temporary Chicanes (1935–1937)
- Length: 6.952 km (4.320 mi)
- Turns: 23
- Race lap record: 2:49.800 ( (Italy) Tazio Nuvolari, Alfa Romeo Monoposto Tipo-C "8C-35", 1935, GP)

Grand Prix Circuit (1934)
- Length: 4.329 km (2.690 mi)
- Turns: 13
- Race lap record: 2:13.600 ( (Germany) Hans Stuck, Auto Union Type A, 1934, GP)

Original Grand Prix Circuit (1922–1933)
- Length: 10.000 km (6.214 mi)
- Turns: 9
- Race lap record: 3:13.200 ( (Italy) Luigi Fagioli, Alfa Romeo P3, 1933, GP)

The Monza Circuit, officially called the Autodromo Nazionale di Monza (Italian for 'Monza National Autodrome'), is a 5.793 km (3.600 mi) race track near the city of Monza, north of Milan, in Italy. Built in 1922, it was the world's fourth purpose-built motor racing circuit after Aspendale, Brooklands and Indianapolis, and the oldest in mainland Europe. The circuit's biggest event is the Italian Grand Prix. With the exception of the 1980 running when the track was closed while undergoing refurbishment, the race has been hosted there since 1949, being one of only three other tracks (namely Silverstone, Monaco, and Spa), to consistently feature on the Formula One calendar since its inaugural season. The circuit is also known as "the Temple of Speed" due to its long straights and high-speed corners.

Built in the Royal Villa of Monza park in a woodland setting, the site has three tracks – the 5.793 km (3.600 mi) Grand Prix track, the 2.405 km (1.494 mi) Junior track, and a 4.250 km (2.641 mi) high speed oval track with steep bankings, which was left unused for decades and had been decaying until it was restored in the 2010s. The major features of the main Grand Prix track include the Curva Grande, the Curva di Lesmo, the Variante Ascari, and the Curva Alboreto (formerly Curva Parabolica). The high-speed curve, Curva Grande, is located after the Variante del Rettifilo, which is located at the end of the front straight or Rettifilo Tribune, and is usually taken flat out by Formula One cars.

In addition to Formula One, the circuit previously hosted the 1,000 km Monza, an endurance sports car race held as part of the World Sportscar Championship and the Le Mans Series. Monza also featured the unique Race of Two Worlds events, which attempted to run Formula One and USAC National Championship cars against each other. The racetrack also previously held rounds of the Grand Prix motorcycle racing (Italian motorcycle Grand Prix), WTCC, TCR International Series, Superbike World Championship, Formula Renault 3.5 Series, and Auto GP. Monza currently hosts rounds of the Blancpain GT Series Endurance Cup, International GT Open, and Euroformula Open Championship, as well as various local championships such as the TCR Italian Series, Italian GT Championship, Porsche Carrera Cup Italia, and Italian F4 Championship, as well as the Monza Rally Show. In 2020, Monza hosted the 2020 World Rally Championship final round, ACI Rally Monza, with the circuit hosting 10 of the 16 rally stages.

Monza also hosts cycling and running events, most notably the Monza 12h Cycling Marathon and Monza 21 Half Marathon. The venue was also selected by Nike scientists for the Breaking2 event, where three runners attempted to break the 2-hour barrier for the marathon. Eliud Kipchoge ran 2:00:25.

A very fast circuit, Monza has been the site of many fatal accidents, especially in the early years of the Formula One World Championship, and has claimed the lives of 52 drivers and 35 spectators. Track modifications have continuously occurred to improve spectator safety and reduce curve speeds, but it is still criticised by the current drivers for its lack of run-off areas, most notoriously at the chicane that cuts the Variante della Roggia.

== History ==
=== Early history ===
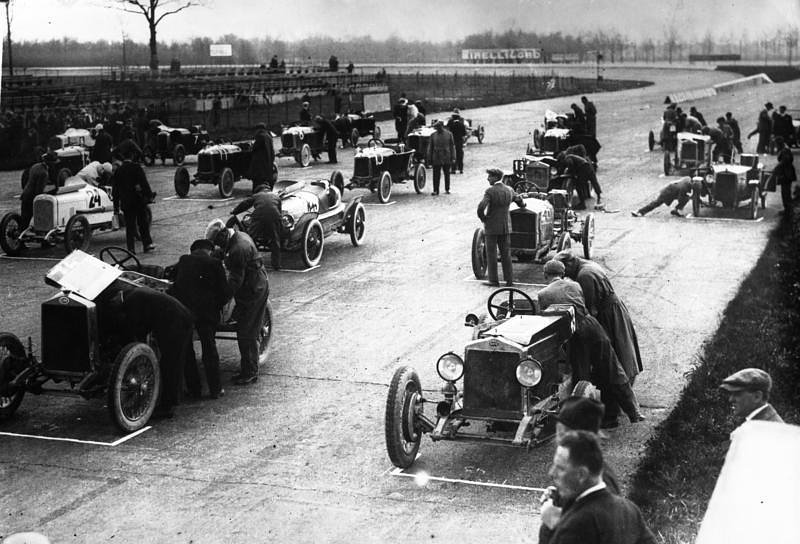
The starting grid of the "1st Cup Fiera di Milano" race held in 1925

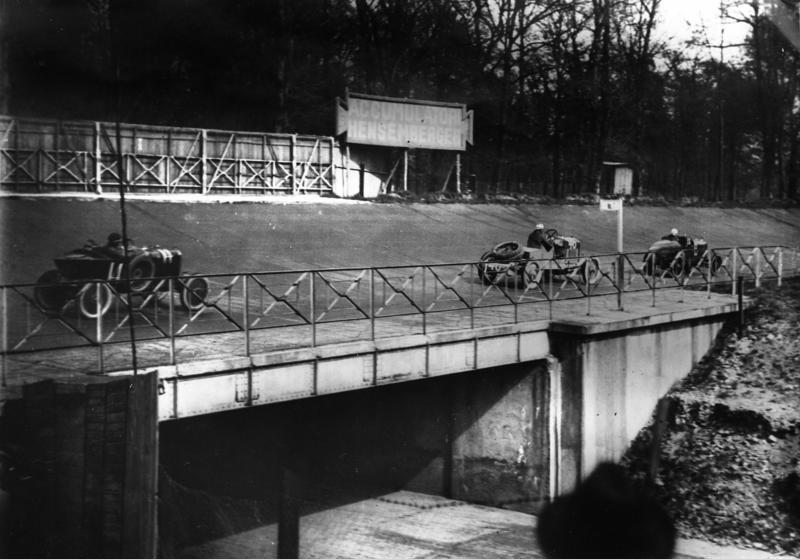
A race in 1925 with cars racing across the bridge

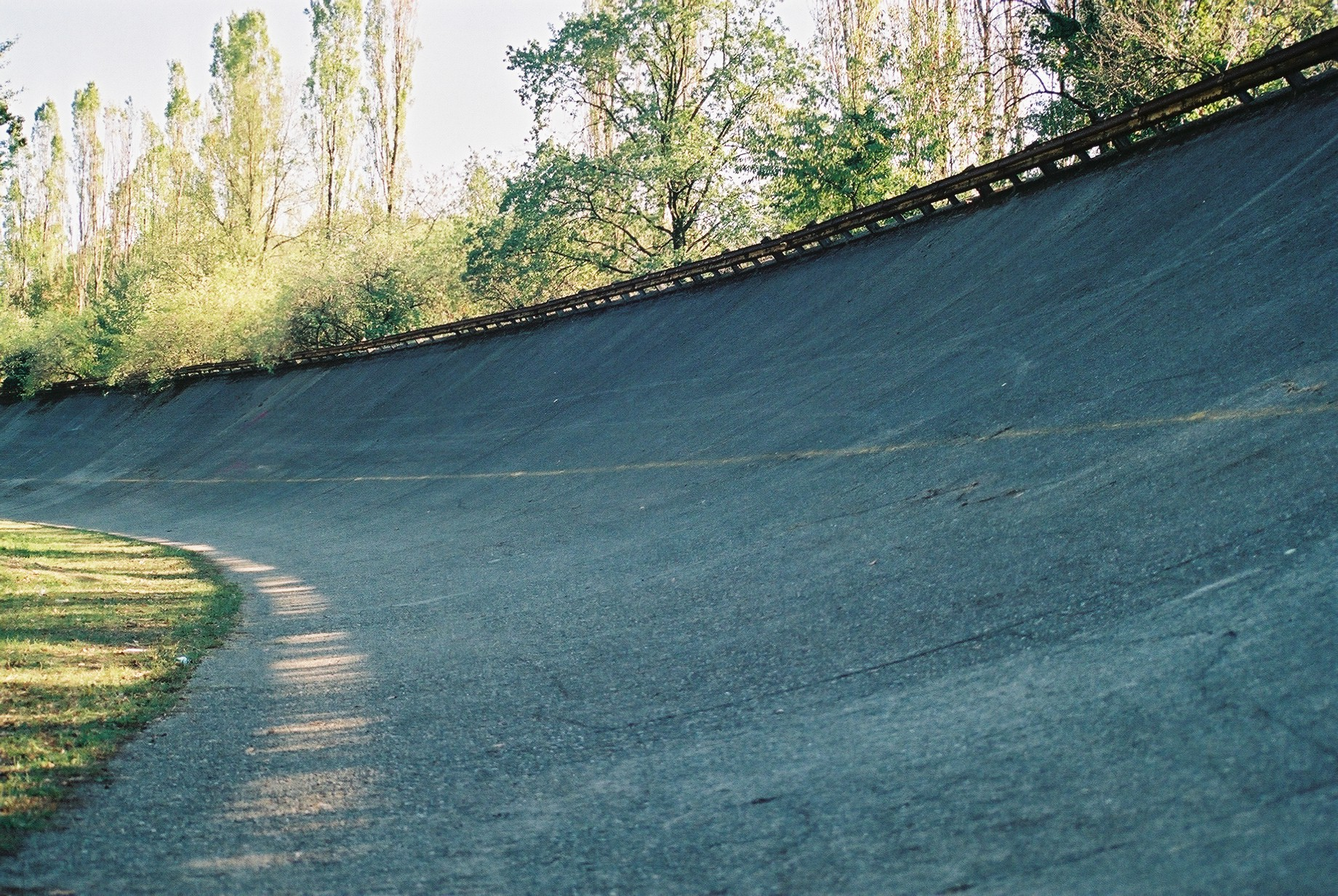
The Pista di Alta Velocità banking, 2003

The first track was built from May to July 1922 by 3,500 workers, financed by the Milan Automobile Club, which created the Società Incremento Automobilismo e Sport (SIAS) (English: Society for the Promotion of Motor Racing and Sport) to run the track. The initial form was a 3.4 km^{2} (1.31 sq mi) site containing a paved 4.490 km (2.790 mi) oval and a 5.500 km (3.418 mi) road course which could be run as a combined 10.000 km (6.214 mi) course via their shared front straight.

The track was officially opened on 3 September 1922, with the maiden race, the second Italian Grand Prix, held on 10 September 1922. Monza's proximity to Milan, the center of Italy's economy, the largest metropolitan area in Italy and one of Europe's leading major cities made Monza a particularly convenient location for racing and other events.

In 1928, the most serious Italian racing accident to date ended in the death of driver Emilio Materassi and 27 spectators at that year's Italian Grand Prix. The accident led to further Grand Prix races' confinement to the high-speed loop until 1932. For these reasons the Italian Grand Prix was not held again until 1931; in the meantime the 1930 Monza Grand Prix was held on the high speed ring only, while in 1930 Vincenzo Florio introduced the Florio Circuit. The 1933 Italian Grand Prix was held on the original complete layout. Still, it was marred by the deaths of three drivers (Giuseppe Campari, Baconin Borzacchini and Stanisław Czaykowski) in the supporting Monza Grand Prix held on the same day—which became known as the "Black Day of Monza"—over the shorter oval circuit and the Grand Prix layout was changed: in 1934 a short circuit with two lanes of the straight line joined by a hairpin, Curva Sud of the banking (with a double chicane) driven in the opposite direction than usual, the "Florio link" and the Curva Sud (with a small chicane). This configuration was considered too slow, and in 1935 the Florio Circuit was used again, this time with four temporary chicanes and another permanent one (along the Curva Sud of the banking). In 1938, only the last one was used.

There was major rebuilding in 1938–39, constructing new stands and entrances, resurfacing the track, removing the high-speed ring and adding two new bends on the southern part of the circuit. The resulting layout gave a Grand Prix lap of 6.300 km (3.915 mi), in use until 1954. The outbreak of World War II meant racing at the track was suspended until 1948 and parts of the circuit degraded due to the lack of maintenance and military use. Monza was renovated over a period of two months at the beginning of 1948 and a Grand Prix was held on 17 October 1948.

=== High speed oval ===
In 1954, work began to entirely revamp the circuit, resulting in a 5.750 km (3.573 mi) course and a new 4.250 km (2.641 mi) high-speed oval with banked sopraelevata curves (the southern one was moved slightly north). The two circuits could be combined to re-create the former 10.000 km (6.214 mi) long circuit, with cars running parallel on the main straight. The first Lesmo curve was modified to be faster, and the track infrastructure and facilities were also updated and improved to accommodate the teams and spectators better.

The Automobile Club of Italy held 500 mi (800 km) Race of Two Worlds exhibition competitions, intended to pit United States Auto Club IndyCars against European Formula One and sports cars. The races were held on the oval at the end of June in 1957 and 1958, with three 63 lap 267.67 km (166.32 mi) heat races each year, races which colloquially became known as the Monzanapolis series. Concerns were raised among the European drivers that flat-out racing on the banking would be too dangerous, so ultimately only Ecurie Ecosse and Maserati represented European racing at the first running. The American teams had brought special Firestone tyres with them, reinforced to withstand high-speed running on the bumpy Monza surface, but the Maseratis' steering was badly affected by the larger-than-usual tyre size, leading to the Modena-based team withdrawal.

Ecurie Ecosse's three Jaguar D-type sports cars used their Le Mans-specification tires with no ill effects, but since they raced at less than their practice speeds to conserve their tires, they were completely outpaced. Two heats in 1957 were won by Jimmy Bryan in his Kuzma-Offenhauser Dean Van Lines Special, and the last by Troy Ruttman in the Watson-Offenhauser John Zink Special. In 1958 Jaguar, Ferrari and Maserati teams appeared alongside the Indy roadsters, but once again the American cars dominated the event and Jim Rathmann won the three races in a Watson-Offenhauser car.

Formula One used the 10.000 km (6.214 mi) high speed track in the 1955, 1956, 1960 and 1961 Grands Prix. Stirling Moss and Phil Hill both won twice in this period, with Hill's win at Monza making him the first American to win a Formula One race. The combined circuit was not used for 3 years because during the 1956 event the Ferraris and Maseratis were suffering mechanically on the banking, and the combined circuit was used again in 1960 because Ferrari's main strength that year was straight-line speed. The organizers wanted to maximise this advantage. The 1961 race saw the death of Wolfgang von Trips and fifteen spectators when a collision with Jim Clark's Lotus sent von Trips' car airborne and into the barriers at the approach to the Parabolica.

Although the accident did not occur on the oval section of the track, the high speeds were deemed unsafe, and F1 use of the oval was ended. Another attempt was made to use the combined circuit for the 1963 race. Still, the extremely bumpy nature and poor overall quality of the concrete banking saw some cars suffer mechanical failures. The teams protested and threatened to leave unless only the road circuit was used, which is ultimately what happened. Future Grands Prix were held on the shorter road circuit, with the banking appearing one last time in the film Grand Prix. New safety walls, rails and fences were added before the next race and the refuelling area was moved further from the track. Chicanes were added before both banking in 1966, and another fatality in the 1968 1000 km Monza race led to run-off areas added to the curves, with the track layout changing the next year to incorporate permanent chicanes before the banked curves – extending the track length by 100 m (110 yd).

The combined circuit held its last major race in 1969 with the 1000 km of Monza, the event moving solely to the road circuit the next year; the banking has never been used again for any major races. The banking still exists, albeit in a decayed state in the years since the last race, escaping demolition in the 1990s. It is used once a year for the Monza Rally, which served as part of the 2021 World Rally Championship, which was the first FIA championship event since 1969. The banked oval was used several times for record-breaking until the late 1960s. However, the severe bumping was a major suspension and tire test for the production cars attempting endurance records, such as the Ford Corsair GT, which in 1964 captured 13 records.

=== Circuit changes and modernisation ===
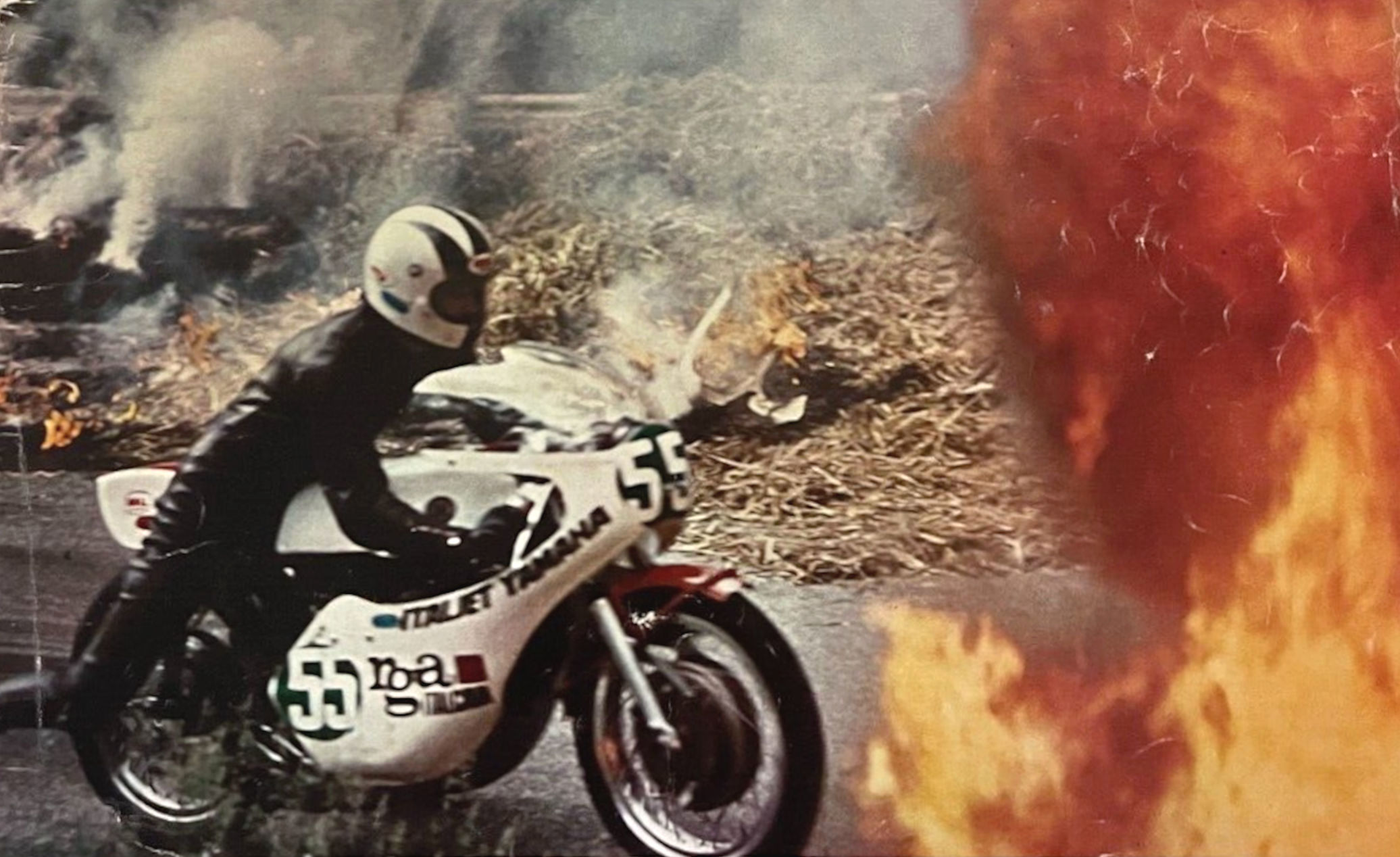
The race accident at the 1973 Nations motorcycle Grand Prix, where Renzo Pasolini and Jarno Saarinen died

Both car and Grand Prix motorcycle racing were regular attractions at Monza. These races involved drivers constantly slipstreaming competing cars, which produced several close finishes, such as in 1967, 1969, and 1971.

As the speed of the machines increased, two chicanes were added in 1972 to reduce racing speeds – the Variante del Rettifilo at the middle of the start/finish straight, and the Variante Ascari. This resulted in a new circuit length of 5.755 km (3.576 mi). Grand Prix motorcycles continued to use the un-slowed road track until two serious accidents resulted in five deaths, including Renzo Pasolini and Jarno Saarinen, in 1973, and motorcycle racing did not return to Monza until 1981. The 1972 chicanes were soon seen to be ineffective at slowing cars; the Vialone was remade in 1974, the other, Curva Grande, in 1976, and a third was also added in 1976 before the Lesmo, with extended run-off areas. The Grand Prix lap after these alterations was increased to 5.800 km (3.604 mi) long.

With technology still increasing vehicle speeds, the track was modified again in 1979 with added safety measures such as new curbs, extended run-off areas and tire barriers to improve safety for drivers off the track. The infrastructure was also improved, with pits able to accommodate 46 cars, and an upgraded paddock and scrutineering facilities. These changes encouraged world championship motorcycling to return in 1981, but further safety work was undertaken through the 1980s. Also in the 1980s, the podium, paddock and pits complex stands, and camp site were either rebuilt or improved.

As motorsport became more safety-conscious following the deaths of Ayrton Senna and Roland Ratzenberger in 1994 at the Imola circuit, the three main long curves were "squeezed" in order to install larger gravel traps, shortening the lap to 5.770 km (3.585 mi). In 1997 the stands were reworked to expand capacity to 51,000. In 2000, the chicane on the main straight was altered, changing from a double left-right chicane to a single right-left chicane in an attempt to reduce the frequent accidents at the start due to the configuration of the braking area. However, it is still deemed unsafe in terms of motorcycle racing. The second chicane was also re-profiled. In the Formula 1 Grand Prix of the same year, the first to use these new chicanes, a fire marshal, Paolo Gislimberti, was killed by flying debris after a big pileup at the second chicane.

In 2007, the run-off area at the second chicane was changed from gravel to asphalt. The length of the track in its current configuration is 5.793 km (3.600 mi). At the 2010 Monza Superbike World Championship round, Italian rider Max Biaggi set the fastest ever motorcycle lap of Monza when he rode his Aprilia RSV4 1000 F to pole position in a time of 1:42.121. In the Superpole qualification for the 2011 race, he improved on this lap time, for a new lap record of 1:41.745, and his speed was captured at more than 330 km/h (210 mph).

In late 2016, work was planned on a new first bend, which would have bypassed the first chicane and the Curva Grande. Drivers were to go through a fast right-hand kink and into a new, faster chicane. Work was planned to be completed by 2017 in hopes of a renewed contract for Formula 1. Gravel would have also returned to the run-off area at the Parabolica bend. However, plans for the track's change were suspended due to the track being in the historic Monza Park. Ahead of the 2024 Italian Grand Prix, the Monza Circuit underwent significant changes. This forced WEC to abandon the 6 Hours of Monza, moving it to the Imola Circuit. In addition to facility improvements, changes included a resurfacing of the entire track.

== A lap of the circuit in a Formula One car ==
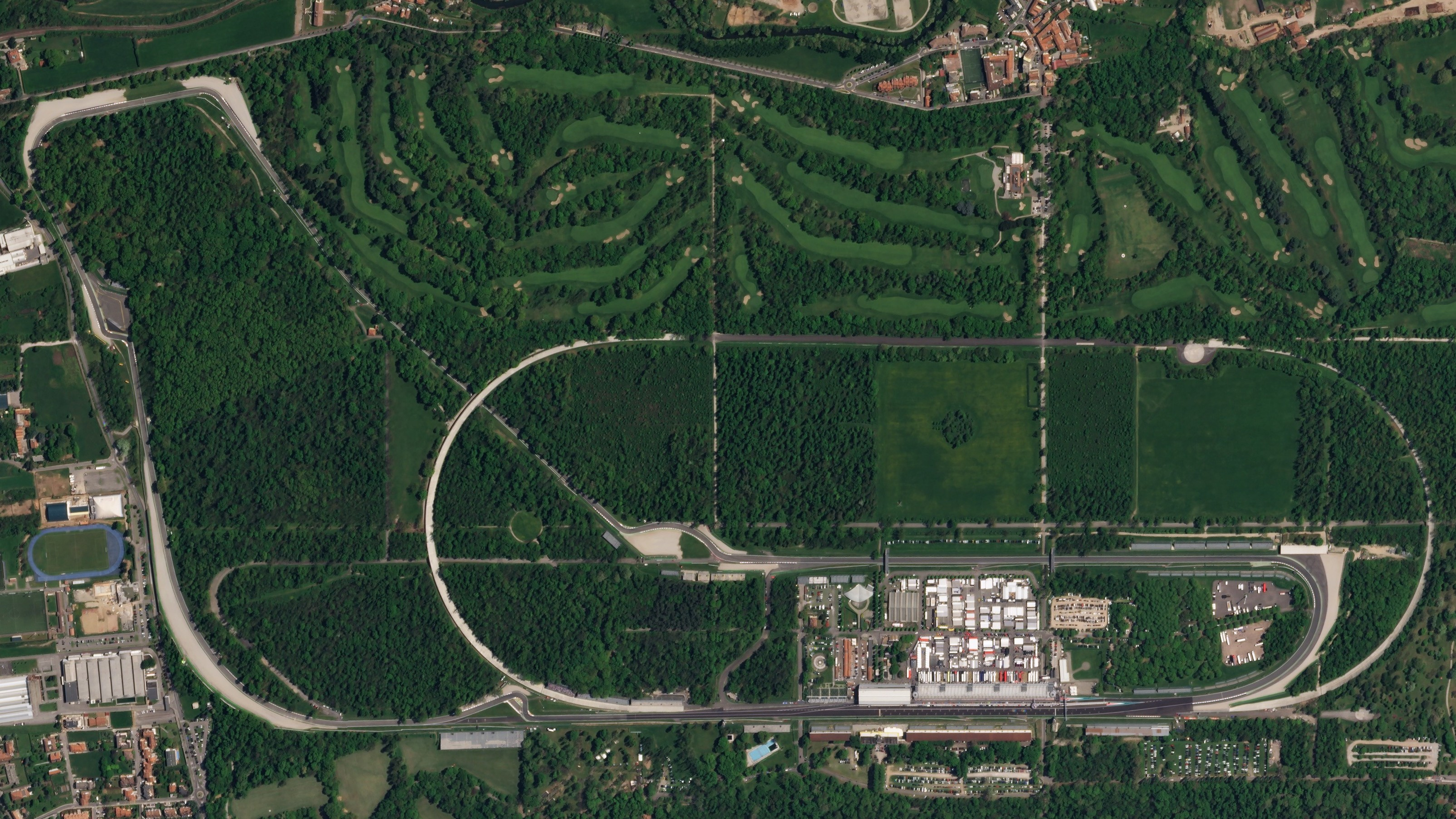
Satellite photograph of the circuit from 2018

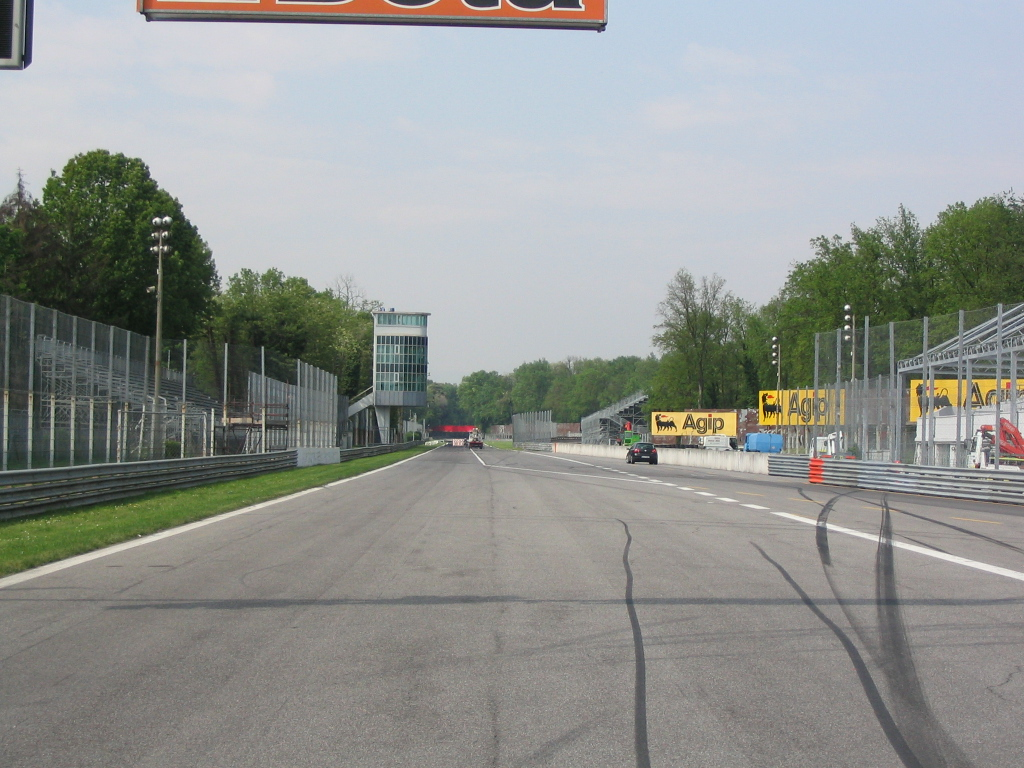
The 1.12 km (0.70 mi) start/finish straight.

Monza has been known for its high-speed, simplistic nature (compared to "harder" circuits such as Singapore or Monaco, which are tight, unforgiving street circuits with lots of corners) thanks to its largely unaltered 1920s design. It is currently the fastest track on the Formula One calendar and has been so since 1991. Monza consists of very long straights and tight chicanes, putting a premium on good braking stability and traction. The 5.793 km (3.600 mi) circuit is very hard on engines; Formula 1 engines are at full throttle for nearly 80% of the lap, with engine failures common, notably Fernando Alonso in the 2006 Italian Grand Prix or Nico Rosberg in the 2015 Italian Grand Prix.

Drivers reach high speeds: 372 km/h (231 mph) during the mid-2000s V10 engine formula. However, in the 2012 with the 2.4L V8 engines, top speeds in Formula One rarely reached over 340 km/h (210 mph); the 1.6L turbocharged hybrid V6 engine, reduced-downforce formula of 2014 displayed top speeds of up to 360 km/h (220 mph). The circuit is generally flat, but has a gradual gradient from the second Lesmos to the Variante Ascari. Due to the low aerodynamic profile needed, with its resulting low downforce, the grip is very low; understeer is a more serious issue than at other circuits; however, the opposite effect, oversteer, is also present in the second sector, requiring the use of a very distinctive opposite lock technique. Since both maximum power and minimal drag are keys for speed on the straights, only competitors with enough power or aerodynamic efficiency at their disposal are able to challenge for the top places.

Formula One cars are set up with one of the smallest wing angles on the F1 calendar to ensure the lowest level of drag on the straights. There are only 6 corner complexes at Monza: the first two chicanes, the two Lesmos, the Ascari complex and the Parabolica. Thus, cars are set up for maximum performance on the straights.

Cars approach the first corner at 340 km/h (210 mph) in eighth gear, and brake at about 120 m (130 yd) before the first chicane—the Variante del Rettifilo—entering at 86 km/h (53 mph) in second gear, and exiting at 72 km/h (45 mph) in second gear. This is the scene of many first-lap accidents. Higher kerbs were installed at the first two chicanes in 2009 to prevent cutting.

Good traction out of the first corner is imperative for a quick lap. Conservation of speed through the first chicane is made possible by driving the straightest line, as a small mistake here can result in a lot of time being lost through the Curva Grande down to the Variante della Roggia chicane in eighth gear, at 330 km/h (210 mph). The braking point is just under the bridge. The curbs are brutal, and it is very easy for a car to become unbalanced and a driver to lose control, as Kimi Räikkönen did in 2005. This chicane is probably the best overtaking chance on the lap, as it is the only one with the "slow corner, long straight, slow corner" layout, one of the characteristics of modern circuits.

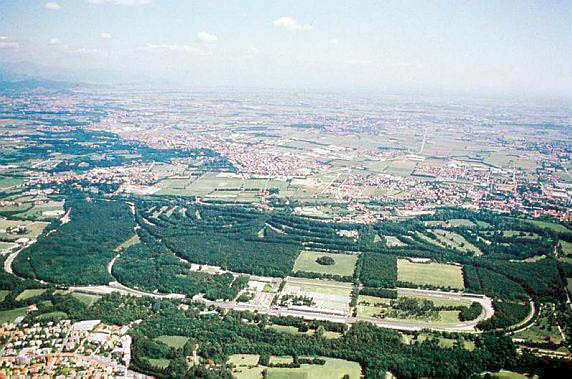
Aerial photo of the Autodromo of Monza, with the village of Villasanta in the upper part. The city of Monza is southwards off to the right of the photo.

The Curve di Lesmo are two corners that are not as fast as they used to be, but are still challenging corners. The first is blind, entered at 273 km/h (170 mph) in sixth gear, apexing at 217 km/h (135 mph), and has a slight banking. The second is a seventh-gear entry at 278 km/h (173 mph), apexing in fifth gear at 203.5 km/h (126.4 mph), and all the curbs must be used. A mistake at one of these corners will result in a spin into the gravel, while good exits can set a driver up for an overtaking move into Variante Ascari.

The downhill approach to Variante Ascari, particularly beneath the bridge, is known for its uneven surface. The Variante Ascari chicane is regarded as one of the circuit's more technically demanding sections and is considered important for achieving competitive lap times.

The final challenge is the Curva Parabolica Alboreto: approaching at 335 km/h (208 mph) in eighth gear, cars quickly dance around the corner, apexing in sixth gear at 229 km/h (142 mph) and exiting in sixth gear at 285 km/h (177 mph), accelerating onto the main start/finish straight. A good exit and slipstream off a fellow driver along the main straight can produce an overtaking opportunity under heavy braking into Variante del Rettifilo; however, it is difficult to follow a leading car closely through the Parabolica as the tow will reduce downforce and cornering speed.

The maximum speed recorded in a 2025 Formula One car was 364.1 km/h (226.2 mph), established at the end of the start/finish straight. They experience a maximum g-force of 4.50 during deceleration. The track has many dramatic high-to-low-speed transitions.

== Lap records ==
Max Verstappen recorded the fastest pole position lap at Monza during the 2025 Italian Grand Prix, when he lapped in 1:18.792 at an average speed of 264.681 km/h (164.465 mph) – the fastest average lap speed recorded in qualifying for a World Championship event. The official race lap record for the current circuit layout is 1:20.901, set by Lando Norris during the same Grand Prix at an average speed of 257.781 km/h (160.178 mph) – the fastest average lap speed recorded in a race for a World Championship event. As of November 2026, the fastest official race lap records of Autodromo Nazionale di Monza are listed as:

Category	Time	Driver	Vehicle	Event
Grand Prix Circuit (2000–present): 5.793 km (3.600 mi)
Formula One	1:20.901	(United Kingdom) Lando Norris	McLaren MCL39	2025 Italian Grand Prix
GP2	1:30.528	(United Kingdom) Lewis Hamilton	Dallara GP2/05	2006 Monza GP2 Series round
LMP1	1:32.449	(France) Nicolas Minassian	Peugeot 908 HDi FAP	2008 1000 km of Monza
FIA F2	1:32.717	(India) Kush Maini	Dallara F2 2024	2024 Monza Formula 2 round
BOSS GP/Formula Renault 3.5	1:33.276	(Brazil) Antônio Pizzonia	Dallara T12	2023 Monza BOSS GP Series round
LMDh	1:34.400	(France) Charles Milesi	Alpine A424	2026 6 Hours of Monza
LMH	1:34.441	(Denmark) Marco Sørensen	Aston Martin Valkyrie AMR-LMH	2026 6 Hours of Monza
Formula Renault 3.5	1:34.899	(United Kingdom) Will Stevens	Dallara T12	2013 Monza Formula Renault 3.5 Series round
LMP2	1:35.988	(Denmark) Mikkel Jensen	Aurus 01	2020 4 Hours of Monza
Auto GP	1:36.286	(Italy) Luca Filippi	Lola B05/52	2011 Monza Auto GP round
Superleague Formula	1:36.466	(Brazil) Antonio Pizzonia	Panoz DP09	2009 Monza Superleague Formula round
FA1	1:37.527	(Sweden) Felix Rosenqvist	Lola B05/52	2014 Monza FA1 round
GP3	1:38.237	(United States) Conor Daly	Dallara GP3/13	2013 Monza GP3 Series round
F3000	1:38.881	(Sweden) Björn Wirdheim	Lola B02/50	2003 Monza F3000 round
FIA F3	1:38.802	(Italy) Leonardo Fornaroli	Dallara F3 2019	2024 Monza Formula 3 round
Formula Nissan	1:39.708	(France) Stéphane Sarrazin	Dallara SN01	2003 Monza World Series by Nissan round
F2 (2009–2012)	1:39.997	(Romania) Mihai Marinescu	Williams JPH1B	2011 Monza FTwo round
WSC	1:40.775	(Italy) Christian Pescatori	Ferrari 333 SP	2000 Aprimatic Trophy
Eurocup-3	1:41.866	(Lebanon) Christopher El Feghali	Dallara 326	2026 Monza Eurocup-3 round
Group C	1:42.146	(France) Éric Hélary	Jaguar XJR-14	2019 Monza Historic
Euroformula Open	1:42.357	(Poland) Tymek Kucharczyk	Dallara 324	2025 Monza Euroformula Open round
LMP3	1:43.317	(France) Thomas Laurent	Ligier JS P320	2026 Monza Masters Endurance Legends round
GB3	1:43.835	(Australia) Alex Ninovic	Tatuus MSV GB3-025	2025 Monza GB3 round
Formula Regional	1:43.966	(United Kingdom) Freddie Slater	Tatuus F3 T-318	2025 Monza FREC round
GT3	1:44.278	(Italy) Tommaso Mosca	Ferrari 296 GT3	2025 Monza International GT Open round
Ferrari Challenge	1:44.425	(Switzerland) Felix Hirsiger	Ferrari 296 Challenge	2025 Monza Ferrari Challenge Europe round
GT1 (GTS)	1:44.708	(Germany) Uwe Alzen	Saleen S7-R	2004 FIA GT Monza 500km
World SBK	1:45.336	(Italy) Michel Fabrizio	Ducati 1098R	2009 Monza World SBK round
Lamborghini Super Trofeo	1:45.462	(Costa Rica) Danny Formal	Lamborghini Huracán LP 620-2 Super Trofeo EVO2	2026 Monza Lamborghini Super Trofeo North America round
SRO GT2	1:45.718	(Austria) Reinhard Kofler	KTM X-Bow GT2	2024 Monza GT2 European Series round
LM GTE	1:45.947	(Italy) Alessandro Pier Guidi	Ferrari 488 GTE Evo	2022 6 Hours of Monza
LMP675	1:47.071	(South Africa) Werner Lupberger	Pilbeam MP84	2000 Aprimatic Trophy
Porsche Carrera Cup	1:48.074	(Italy) Simone Iaquinta	Porsche 911 (992 I) GT3 Cup	2026 Monza GT Cup Open Europe round
GT2	1:49.569	(Italy) Gianmaria Bruni	Ferrari F430 GTC	2008 1000 km of Monza
World SSP	1:49.728	(United Kingdom) Cal Crutchlow	Yamaha YZF-R6	2009 Monza World SSP round
Formula Renault 2.0	1:49.922	(France) Sacha Fenestraz	Tatuus FR2.0/13	2017 Monza Formula Renault Eurocup round
N-GT	1:49.967	(Monaco) Stéphane Ortelli	Porsche 911 (996) GT3-RSR	2004 FIA GT Monza 500km
Formula Abarth	1:49.993	(Japan) Yoshitaka Kuroda	Tatuus FA010	2011 Monza Formula Abarth round
CN	1:50.299	(Switzerland) Sabrina Hungerbühler	Osella PA20	2003 Monza Interserie round
Formula 4	1:51.179	(Australia) Gianmarco Pradel	Tatuus F4-T421	2024 Monza Euro 4 Championship round
FIA GT Group 2	1:51.285	(United Kingdom) Sean Edwards	Saleen S7-R	2008 FIA GT Monza 2 Hours
Formula Palmer Audi	1:52.498	(Spain) Emilio de Villota Jr.	Formula Palmer Audi car	2005 Monza Formula Palmer Audi round
TC1	1:53.381	(Sweden) Thed Björk	Volvo S60 Polestar TC1	2017 FIA WTCC Race of Italy
Group 6	1:54.109	(Switzerland) Yves Scemama	TOJ SC304	2019 Monza Historic
JS P4	1:54.159	(France) Gillian Henrion	Ligier JS P4	2022 Monza Ligier European Series round
Indy Autonomous Challenge	1:54.442	(Italy) Unimore Racing	IAC AV-24	2025 Milan Monza Motor Show
TCR Touring Car	1:54.484	(Italy) Gabriele Covini	Hyundai Elantra N TCR	2026 Monza TCR Europe round
GT4	1:54.632	(Spain) Lluc Ibáñez	Mercedes-AMG GT4	2024 Monza GT4 European Series round
Super Touring	1:54.859	(Netherlands) Peter Kox	Honda Accord	2000 Monza ESTC round
Group 5 sports car	1:55.137	(Monaco) Claudio Roddaro	Porsche 917	2019 Monza Historic
Alpine Elf Cup	1:58.104	(France) Léo Jousset	Alpine A110 Cup	2024 Monza Alpine Elf Cup round
Formula BMW	1:58.683	(United Kingdom) Jack Harvey	Mygale FB02	2009 Monza Formula BMW Europe Round
Super 2000	1:59.000	(United Kingdom) Robert Huff	Chevrolet Cruze 1.6T	2012 FIA WTCC Race of Italy
Stock car racing	1:59.256	(Spain) Ander Vilariño	Chevrolet Camaro NASCAR	2013 Monza NASCAR Whelen Euro Series round
JS2 R	2:00.428	(Austria) Horst Felix Felbermayr	Ligier JS2 R	2022 Monza Ligier European Series round
SEAT León Supercopa	2:00.813	(Spain) Mikel Azcona	SEAT León Cup Racer	2015 Monza SEAT León Eurocup round
Formula Renault 1.6	2:01.008	(France) Victor Martins	Signatech FR 1.6	2017 Monza French F4 round
Pickup truck racing	2:04.066	(Italy) Giacomo Ricci	MWV6 Pick Up	2014 Monza MW-V6 Pickup Series round
Group 2	2:04.174	(Germany) Michael Ferlich	BMW 3.0 CSL	2019 Monza Historic
Group 3	2:09.965	(Switzerland) Charles Firmenich	Shelby Cobra	2019 Monza Historic
Formula Junior	2:11.003	(Italy) Pierre Tonetti	Brabham BT6	2019 Monza Historic
Renault Clio Cup	2.11.756	(Italy) Massimilliano Danetti	Renault Clio R.S. IV	2020 Monza Renault Clio Cup Italy round
Motorcycle Circuit (2010–present): 5.777 km (3.590 mi)
World SBK	1:42.229	(United Kingdom) Tom Sykes	Kawasaki Ninja ZX-10R	2013 Monza World SBK round
Superbike	1:44.330	(Italy) Luca Conforti	Ducati 1098R	2012 Monza CIV Supersport round
World SSP	1:47.767	(Republic of Ireland) Eugene Laverty	Honda CBR600RR	2010 Monza World SSP round
Supersport	1:49.876	(Italy) Stefano Cruciani	Kawasaki Ninja ZX-6R	2012 Monza CIV Supersport round
Junior Course (1959–present): 2.405 km (1.494 mi)
Group 5	0:54.300	(Italy) Giorgio Schön	Porsche 934/76	1976 Monza Group 5 round
Group 6	0:56.500	(Italy) Pier Giorgio Pellegrin	Fiat Abarth 1000SP	1971 Monza Sports Prototype round
Group 4	0:56.700	(Italy) Ennio Bonomelli	Porsche 911 Carrera RSR	1973 Coppa Agip Monza
Group 2	1:02.000	(Italy) Angelo Chiapparini	Alfa Romeo GTA	1973 Coppa Agip Monza
Grand Prix Circuit (1996–1999): 5.770 km (3.585 mi)
Formula One	1:24.808	(Finland) Mika Häkkinen	McLaren MP4/12	1997 Italian Grand Prix
WSC	1:36.915	(Italy) Andrea Montermini	Ferrari 333 SP	1997 1000 km of Monza
F3000	1:40.849	(Brazil) Marcelo Battistuzzi	Lola T96/50	1999 Monza Italian F3000 round
GT1	1:44.354	(United Kingdom) Ray Bellm	McLaren F1 GTR	1996 BPR 4 Hours of Monza
Formula Three	1:45.393	(Sweden) Peter Sundberg	Dallara F399	1999 Monza Italian F3 round
GT2	1:46.278	(Monaco) Olivier Beretta	Chrysler Viper GTS-R	1999 FIA GT Monza 500km
World SBK	1:46.533	(Australia) Troy Corser	Ducati 996	1999 Monza World SBK round
Super Touring	1:51.946	(Italy) Fabrizio Giovanardi	Alfa Romeo 156 D2	1999 Monza Italian Superturismo round
World SSP	1:53.155	(Germany) Christian Kellner	Yamaha YZF-R6	1999 Monza World SSP round
Porsche Carrera Cup	1:54.460	(Germany) Ralf Kelleners	Porsche 911 (996) GT3 Cup	1998 Monza Porsche Supercup round
Grand Prix Circuit (1994–1995): 5.834 km (3.625 mi)
Formula One	1:25.930	(United Kingdom) Damon Hill	Williams FW16B	1994 Italian Grand Prix
GT1	1:46.203	(Sweden) Anders Olofsson	Ferrari F40 GTE	1995 BPR 4 Hours of Monza
Formula Three	1:46.910	(Italy) Michele Gasparini	Dallara F394	1994 Monza Italian F3 round
World SBK	1:48.330	(United Kingdom) Carl Fogarty	Ducati 916	1995 Monza World SBK round
Super Touring	1:56.133	(Italy) Antonio Tamburini	Alfa Romeo 155 TS	1994 Monza Italian Superturismo round
Grand Prix Circuit (1976–1993): 5.800 km (3.604 mi)
Formula One	1:23.575	(United Kingdom) Damon Hill	Williams FW15C	1993 Italian Grand Prix
Group C	1:29.128	(United Kingdom) Martin Brundle	Jaguar XJR-14	1991 430 km of Monza
F3000	1:38.881	(United Kingdom) Damon Hill	Lola T90/50	1990 Monza F3000 round
Group C2	1:41.884	(Italy) Ranieri Randaccio	Spice SE90C	1992 500 km of Monza
Group 6 racing cars	1:42.350	(Italy) Arturo Merzario	Alfa Romeo T33/SC/12	1977 500 km of Monza
Formula Two	1:42.790	(United Kingdom) Brian Henton	Toleman TG280B	1980 Monza Grand Prix
Formula Three	1:46.408	(Brazil) Niko Palhares	Dallara F391	1991 Monza Italian F3 round
500cc	1:49.000	(Australia) Wayne Gardner	Honda NSR500	1987 Nations motorcycle Grand Prix
Group A	1:50.297	(Italy) Nicola Larini	Alfa Romeo 155 GTA	1992 1st Monza Italian Superturismo round
GT1	1:53.220	(Italy) Marco Brand	Ferrari F40	1993 Monza Italian GT round
BMW M1 Procar	1:53.560	(Austria) Niki Lauda	BMW M1 Procar	1979 Monza BMW M1 Procar round
World SBK	1:54.650	(Australia) Rob Phillis	Kawasaki ZXR-750	1990 Monza World SBK round
250cc	1:55.750	(France) Dominique Sarron	Honda NSR250	1987 Nations motorcycle Grand Prix
Super Touring	1:58.080	(Belgium) Eric van de Poele	Nissan Primera GT	1993 FIA Touring Car Challenge
Ferrari Challenge	1:58.870	(Argentina) Oscar Larrauri	Ferrari 348 GTB	1993 Monza Italian GT round
Formula Renault 2.0	1:58.960	(France) Olivier Couvreur	Alpa FR90	1990 Monza French Formula Renault round
Group 5	2:01.800	(West Germany) Harald Grohs	Porsche 935J	1981 1000 km of Monza
125cc	2:03.150	(Italy) Bruno Casanova	Garelli 125 GP	1987 Nations motorcycle Grand Prix
50cc	2:27.760	(Italy) Eugenio Lazzarini	Garelli 50 GP	1983 Nations motorcycle Grand Prix
Grand Prix Circuit (1974–1976): 5.780 km (3.592 mi)
Group 6 prototype	1:29.600	(France) Jean-Pierre Jarier	Renault Alpine A442	1976 Monza 4 Hours
Group 5 prototype	1:31.300	(United Kingdom) Derek Bell	Mirage GR7	1974 1000km of Monza
Formula One	1:33.100	(Switzerland) Clay Regazzoni	Ferrari 312T	1975 Italian Grand Prix
F5000	1:37.400	(United Kingdom) Peter Gethin	Chevron B28	1974 Monza F5000 round
Group 2	1:41.300	(Italy) Vittorio Brambilla	BMW 3.0 CSL	1975 4 Hours of Monza
Formula Three	1:49.200	(Italy) Luigino Grassi	Ralt RT1	1975 Monza European F3 round
Group 1	1:51.650	(Sweden) Reine Wisell	Chevrolet Camaro Z28	1976 4 Hours of Monza
Grand Prix Circuit (1972–1973): 5.775 km (3.588 mi)
Group 5 prototype	1:21.900	(France) François Cevert	Matra-Simca MS670	1973 1000km of Monza
F1	1:35.300	(United Kingdom) Jackie Stewart	Tyrrell 006	1973 Italian Grand Prix
Group 2	1:38.300	(Italy) Vittorio Brambilla (Note: Both drivers took the same lap time in this race independently.) (West Germany) Jochen Mass	BMW 3.0 CSL; Ford Capri RS 2600	1973 4 Hours of Monza
Group 4	1:40.000	(Italy) Marcello Gallo	De Tomaso Pantera	1973 6 Hours of Monza
Formula Two	1:41.000	(United Kingdom) Roger Williamson	March 732	1973 Monza F2 round
Grand Prix Circuit (1955–1959, 1962–1971) Motorcycle Circuit (1955–1973): 5.750 km (3.573 mi)
F1	1:23.800	(France) Henri Pescarolo	March 711	1971 Italian Grand Prix
Group 5 sportscars	1:24.000	(Mexico) Pedro Rodríguez	Porsche 917K	1971 1000km of Monza
F5000	1:27.300	(Australia) Frank Gardner	Lola T192	1971 Monza F5000 round
500cc	1:41:200	(Italy) Giacomo Agostini	MV Agusta 500 Three	1971 Nations motorcycle Grand Prix
350cc	1:42:500	(Italy) Renzo Pasolini	Harley-Davidson RR350	1973 Nations motorcycle Grand Prix
250cc	1:45.700	(United Kingdom) Bill Ivy	Yamaha 250 V4	1967 Nations motorcycle Grand Prix
125cc	1:54.600	(Italy) Gilberto Parlotti	Morbidelli 125	1971 Nations motorcycle Grand Prix
50cc	2:10.000	(Netherlands) Jan de Vries	Kreidler 50 GP	1971 Nations motorcycle Grand Prix
Oval Circuit (1955–1971): 4.250 km (2.641 mi)
USAC Indycar	0:54.000	(United States) Bob Veith	Kurtis Kraft 500G-Offenhauser	1958 Race of Two Worlds
Combined Circuit with chicanes before banking (1966-1969): 10.100 km (6.276 mi)
Group 6	2:48.100	(Mexico) Pedro Rodriguez	Ferrari 312 P	1969 Monza 1000km
Combined Circuit (1955–1971): 10.000 km (6.214 mi)
F1	2:43.600	(United States) Phil Hill	Ferrari 246 F1	1960 Italian Grand Prix
Grand Prix Circuit (1948–1954): 6.300 km (3.915 mi)
F1	1:56.200	(Italy) Giuseppe Farina	Alfa Romeo 159M	1951 Italian Grand Prix
F2	2:04.500	(Argentina) Juan Manuel Fangio	Maserati A6GCM	1953 Italian Grand Prix
500cc	2:04.600	(United Kingdom) Geoff Duke	Gilera 500 4C	1954 Nations motorcycle Grand Prix
350cc	2:14.800	(United Kingdom) Fergus Anderson	Moto Guzzi e50	1954 Nations motorcycle Grand Prix
250cc	2:20.600	(Italy) Enrico Lorenzetti	Moto Guzzi 250	1953 Nations motorcycle Grand Prix
125cc	2:37.000	(West Germany) Werner Haas	NSU 125	1953 Nations motorcycle Grand Prix
Florio Circuit (1938–1949): 6.993 km (4.345 mi)
GP	2:34.200	(Germany) Hermann Lang	Mercedes-Benz W154	1938 Italian Grand Prix
Florio Circuit with Temporary Chicanes (1935–1937): 6.952 km (4.320 mi)
GP	2:49.800	(Italy) Tazio Nuvolari	Alfa Romeo Monoposto Tipo-C "8C-35"	1935 Italian Grand Prix
Grand Prix Circuit (1934): 4.330 km (2.691 mi)
GP	2:13.600	(Germany) Hans Stuck	Auto Union Type A	1934 Italian Grand Prix
Original Grand Prix Circuit (1922–1933): 10.000 km (6.214 mi)
GP	3:13.200	(Italy) Luigi Fagioli	Alfa Romeo P3	1933 Italian Grand Prix
Voiturette	4:08.200	(Italy) Pietro Bordino	Fiat 502SS	1922 Gran Premio delle Voiturette

== Deaths from crashes ==
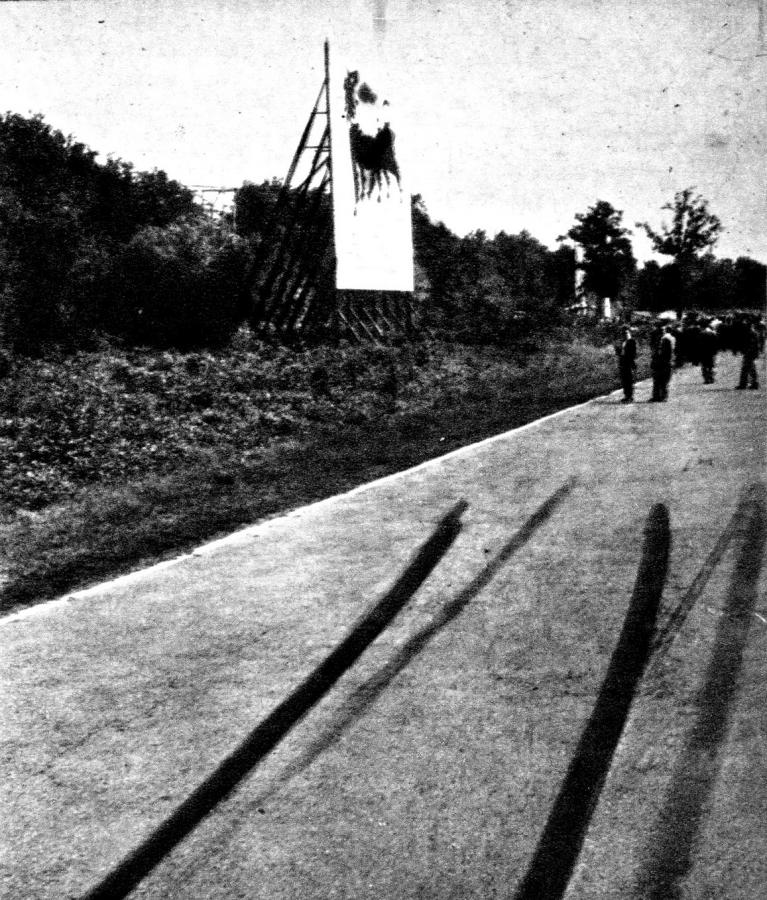
The curve where Alberto Ascari crashed in 1955. He died a few minutes later.

- 1922 Fritz Kuhn (Austro-Daimler), killed during practice for the 1922 Italian Grand Prix
- 1923 Enrico Giaccone, riding as passenger in a Fiat 805 during private testing, with Pietro Bordino driving
- 1923 Ugo Sivocci (Alfa Romeo P1), killed during practice for the 1923 Italian Grand Prix
- 1924 Count Louis Zborowski (Mercedes), killed after crashing into a tree at Lesmo during the 1924 Italian Grand Prix
- 1928 Emilio Materassi and 27 spectators killed after Materassi crashed his Talbot into the grandstand during the 1928 Italian Grand Prix
- 1931 Luigi Arcangeli (Alfa Romeo), killed after crashing at Lesmo during practice for the 1931 Italian Grand Prix
- 1933 Giuseppe Campari (Alfa Romeo Tipo B 2.6 litre), Mario Umberto Borzacchini (Maserati 8C-3000) and Stanislas Czaykowski (Bugatti), killed after crashing at the south banking during the 1933 Monza Grand Prix
- 1954 Rupert Hollaus, killed during practice during the Italian motorcycle Grand Prix
- 1955 Alberto Ascari, killed during private testing at the Vialone, which is now the Ascari chicane, driving a Ferrari 750 Monza, just four days after his harbour crash in the 1955 Monaco Grand Prix
- 1961 Wolfgang von Trips and 14 spectators killed after von Trips collided with Jim Clark approaching the Parabolica on the second lap of the 1961 Italian Grand Prix
- 1965 Bruno Deserti, killed during Ferrari official test prior to Le Mans in a Ferrari P2/3 4000 cc
- 1965 Tommy Spychiger, killed during a 1000K Sports car race in a Ferrari 365P2 at the Parabolica
- 1970 Jochen Rindt, killed after crashing at the Parabolica during practice for the 1970 Italian Grand Prix
- 1973 Renzo Pasolini, Jarno Saarinen killed in a mass crash at the Curva Grande during the 250 cc class of the Nations Grand Prix (Prior to 1990, the Italian round was called the Nations Grand Prix)
- 1973 Carlo Chionio, Renzo Colombini and Renato Galtrucco during a race for 500 cc Juniores Italian motorcycle championship
- 1974 Silvio Moser, died in hospital one month after suffering injuries at the 1000 km Monza race
- 1978 Ronnie Peterson, died in hospital after crashing during the start of the 1978 Italian Grand Prix
- 1998 Michael Paquay, Belgian motorbike racer, died after a crash in practice for the Italian round of World Supersport Championships, Honda CBR 600
- 2000 Paolo Gislimberti, a marshal hit by debris from a first-lap accident at the Roggia chicane during the Italian Grand Prix

== Previous track configurations ==
Original circuit (1922–1933)

Florio circuit (1935–1938)

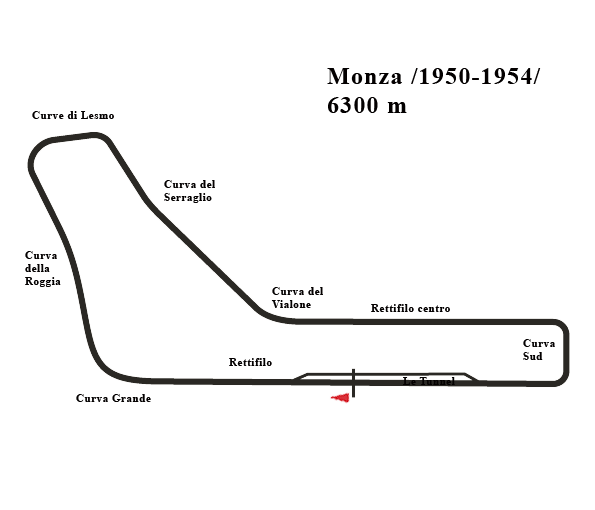
2nd variation (1948–1954)

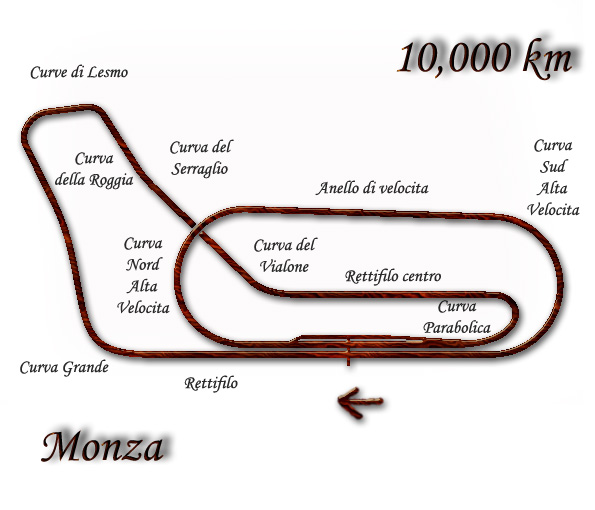
3rd variation (Combined circuit) (1955–1965)

3rd variation (Oval circuit) (1955–1969)

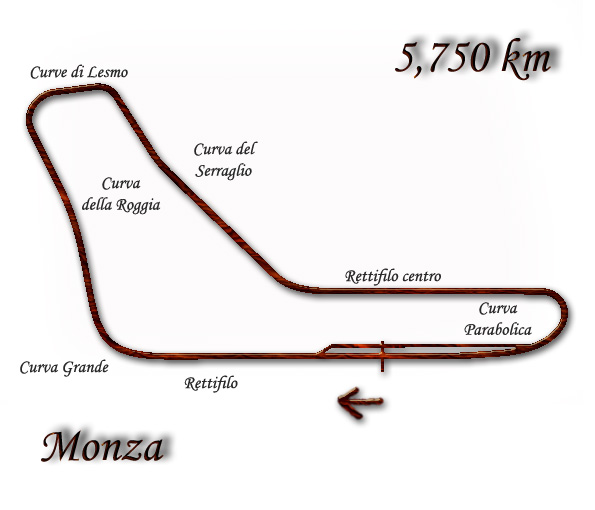
4th variation (Road circuit) (1957–1959, 1962–1971)

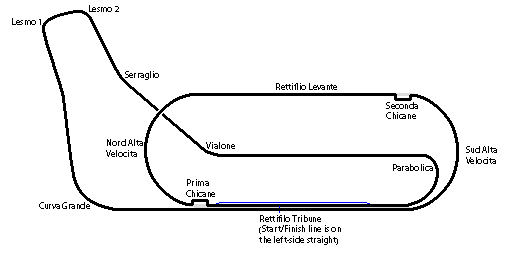
1000 km circuit (combined circuit with chicanes) (1966–1969)

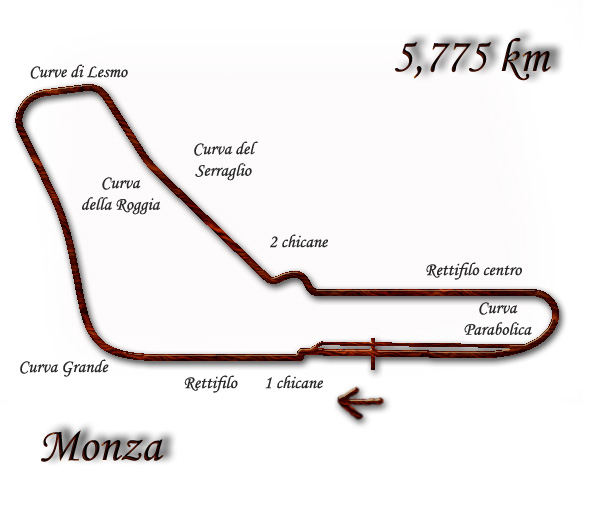
5th variation (1972–1973)

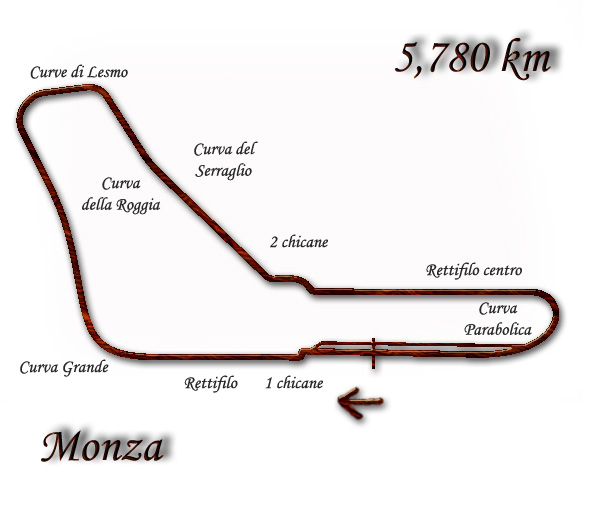
6th variation (1974–1976)

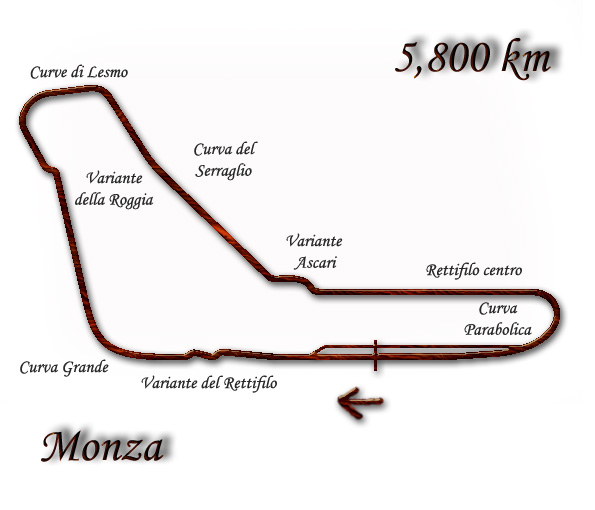
7th variation (1976–1993)

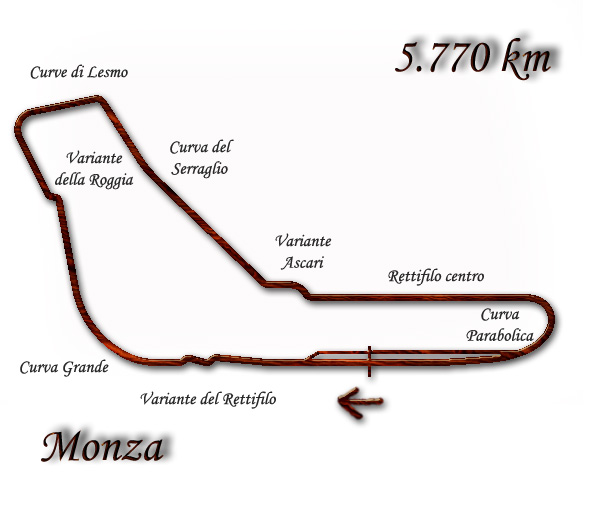
8th variation (1994–1999)

9th variation (2000–present)

== Events ==
Current

- June: Formula Regional European Championship ACI Racing Weekend Monza, Italian GT Championship, TCR Italian Series, Italian F4 Championship, Porsche Carrera Cup Italia
- August: Eurocup-3, Austria Formula Cup, Prototype Cup Europe
- September: Formula One Italian Grand Prix, FIA Formula 2 Championship Monza Formula 2 round, FIA Formula 3 Championship, International GT Open, Euroformula Open Championship, TCR Europe Touring Car Series, Porsche Supercup, GT Cup Open Europe
- October: Lamborghini Super Trofeo World Finals, Italian GT Championship ACI Racing Weekend Monza, E4 Championship, Lamborghini Super Trofeo Europe, Lamborghini Super Trofeo Asia, Lamborghini Super Trofeo North America
- November: FIA World Endurance Championship 6 Hours of Monza, Legends of Le Mans Series

Future

- Porsche Carrera Cup France (2001, 2010, 2021, 2023, 2027)
- Porsche Carrera Cup Germany (1987–1988, 2021, 2027)

Former

- 24H Series
  - 12 Hours of Monza (2020, 2023)
- Acceleration 2014 (2014)
- Alpine Elf Cup Series (2022, 2024)
- Auto GP (1999–2005, 2007, 2009–2014, 2016)
- BMW M1 Procar Championship (1979)
- BOSS GP (2011–2016, 2018–2019, 2021, 2023, 2025)
- BPR Global GT Series (1995–1996)
- British Formula 3 International Series (2005, 2007–2008, 2011–2012)
- Deutsche Tourenwagen Masters (2021)
- DTM Trophy (2021)
- Eurocup Mégane Trophy (2005)
- European Formula 5000 Championship (1970–1971, 1974)
- European Formula Two Championship (1973)
- European Le Mans Series
  - 4 Hours of Monza (2017–2022)
  - 1000 km of Monza (2004–2005, 2007–2008)
- European Touring Car Championship (1964–1986, 1988, 2000–2001, 2003–2004)
- European Touring Car Cup (2012–2013, 2017)
- EuroV8 Series (2014)
- F1 Academy (2023)
- Ferrari Challenge Europe (2004, 2006–2017, 2021, 2025)
- Ferrari Challenge Finali Mondiali (2001, 2004, 2006, 2018)
- FFSA GT Championship (2001)
- FIA European Formula 3 Championship (1975–1980, 1982–1984)
- FIA Formula 3 European Championship (2013, 2015, 2017)
- FIA Formula Two Championship (2010–2012)
- FIA GT Championship (1999–2001, 2003–2005, 2007–2008)
- FIA Sportscar Championship (1999–2001, 2003)
- FIM Endurance World Championship (1964–1965, 1985, 1987)
- Formula Abarth Italian Championship (2005, 2007–2014)
- Formula BMW Europe (2008–2010)
- Formula Palmer Audi (2003–2005)
- Formula Renault 2.0 Alps (2011–2015)
- Formula Renault Eurocup (1995–2001, 2004–2005, 2016–2020)
- Formula Renault V6 Eurocup (2003–2004)
- French F4 Championship (2009, 2017, 2021)
- French Formula Renault Championship (1990, 1995, 1999)
- French Formula Three Championship (1978)
- GB3 Championship (2025)
- GP2 Series
  - Monza GP2 round (2005–2016)
- GP3 Series (2010–2018)
- Grand Prix motorcycle racing
  - Italian motorcycle Grand Prix (1949–1968, 1970–1971, 1981, 1983, 1986–1987)
- Indy Autonomous Challenge (2023, 2025)
- International Formula 3000 (1988, 1990, 2001–2004)
- International Formula Master (2005–2008)
- International GTSprint Series (2011–2013)
- Italian Formula Renault Championship (2000–2012)
- Italian Formula Three Championship (1971–1993, 1995, 2002–2005, 2007–2012)
- Le Mans Cup (2017–2022)
- Ligier European Series (2020–2022)
- Monza Grand Prix (1922, 1929–1933, 1948–1952, 1980)
- Monza Rally Show (1978–2000, 2003–2021, 2023–2024)
- NASCAR Whelen Euro Series (2013)
- Race of Two Worlds (1957–1958)
- SEAT León Eurocup (2008, 2010, 2014–2015)
- Sidecar World Championship (1949–1957, 1965, 1967, 1999–2003)
- Superbike World Championship (1990, 1992–1993, 1995–2013)
- Superleague Formula (2009)
- Supersport World Championship (1997–2013)
- Superstars Series (2004–2005, 2007–2013)
- TCR Eastern Europe Trophy (2019)
- TCR International Series (2015, 2017)
- TCR World Tour (2025)
- Trofeo Maserati (2003–2006, 2010–2011)
- World Rally Championship
  - Rally Monza (2020–2021)
- World Series Formula V8 3.5 (1999–2003, 2005, 2007–2008, 2011, 2013–2014, 2016–2017)
- World Sportscar Championship (1963–1975, 1980–1988, 1990–1992)
- World Touring Car Championship
  - FIA WTCC Race of Italy (2005–2008, 2010–2013, 2017)

Special

- Nike Breaking2

== See also ==
- List of sporting venues with a highest attendance of 100,000 or more
