= Monza Biennial II =

Monza Biennial

Overview
- BIE-class: Triennial exposition
- Name: Monza Biennial
- Motto: International Exhibition of Decorative Arts
- Building(s): Royal Villa of Monza
- Organized by: Istituto Superiore per le Industrie Artistiche

Location
- Country: Italy
- City: Monza
- Coordinates: 45.593437°N 9.274183°E

Timeline
- Opening: 19 May 1925
- Closure: 20 October 1925

Triennial expositions
- Previous: Monza Biennial in Monza
- Next: Monza Biennial III in Monza

The Milan Biennial III was the third edition of the Monza Biennial. This, and the other 3 biennials, were organised by the Istituto Superiore per le Industrie Artistiche (ISIA) to provide an arts vision for the new Kingdom of Italy. It was called the International Exhibition of Decorative Arts.

It was held in Monza at the Royal Villa of Monza, and ran from 19 May 1923 to 20 October 1923.

After 4 biennials the timing was changed to every three years to form the Milan Triennials.
