= Monza Biennial IV =

Overview
- BIE-class: Triennial exposition
- Name: Monza Biennial IV
- Motto: International Exhibition of Modern Decorative and Industrial Arts
- Building(s): Royal Villa of Monza
- Organized by: Istituto Superiore per le Industrie Artistiche

Location
- Country: Italy
- City: Monza
- Coordinates: 45.593437°N 9.274183°E

Timeline
- Opening: 11 May 1930
- Closure: 2 November 1930

Triennial expositions
- Previous: Monza Biennial III in Monza
- Next: Milan Triennial V in Milan

The Milan Biennial IV was the fourth biennial, and like the earlier ones was organised by the Istituto Superiore per le Industrie Artistiche (ISIA) and held in Monza at the Royal Villa of Monza. It was called the International Exhibition of Modern Decorative and Industrial Arts, a change in name from the earlier three, and had an increased scope including architecture. It and ran from 11 May to 2 November 1930.

It took place 3 years after the previous biennial, was the last edition of before it moved to in a new building, the Palazzo dell'Arte in Milan, and became a triennial.
