= Monza Biennial =

Overview
- BIE-class: Triennial exposition
- Name: Monza Biennial
- Motto: International Exhibition of Decorative Arts
- Building(s): Royal Villa of Monza
- Organized by: Istituto Superiore per le Industrie Artistiche

Location
- Country: Italy
- City: Monza
- Coordinates: 45.593437°N 9.274183°E

Timeline
- Opening: 19 May 1923
- Closure: 31 October 1923

Triennial expositions
- Next: Monza Biennial II in Monza

The Milan Biennial was the first edition of the Milan Biennial. This, and the 3 subsequent biennials, were organised by the Istituto Superiore per le Industrie Artistiche (ISIA) to provide an arts vision for the new Kingdom of Italy. It was called the International Exhibition of Decorative Arts. Exhibitions included a Futurist Hall by Fortunato Depero.

It was held in Monza at the Royal Villa of Monza, and ran from 19 May 1923 to 31 October 1923.

After 4 biennials the timing was changed to every three years to form the Milan Triennials.
