= Monza GP2 round =

(Italy) Monza GP2 round

GP2 Series
- Venue: Autodromo Nazionale Monza
- Location: Monza, Italy
- First race: 2005
- Last race: 2016
- Most wins (driver): (Italy) Giorgio Pantano (3)
- Most wins (team): (Spain) Racing Engineering (6)
- Lap record: 1:30.528 ( (United Kingdom) Lewis Hamilton, ART Grand Prix, GP2/05, 2006)

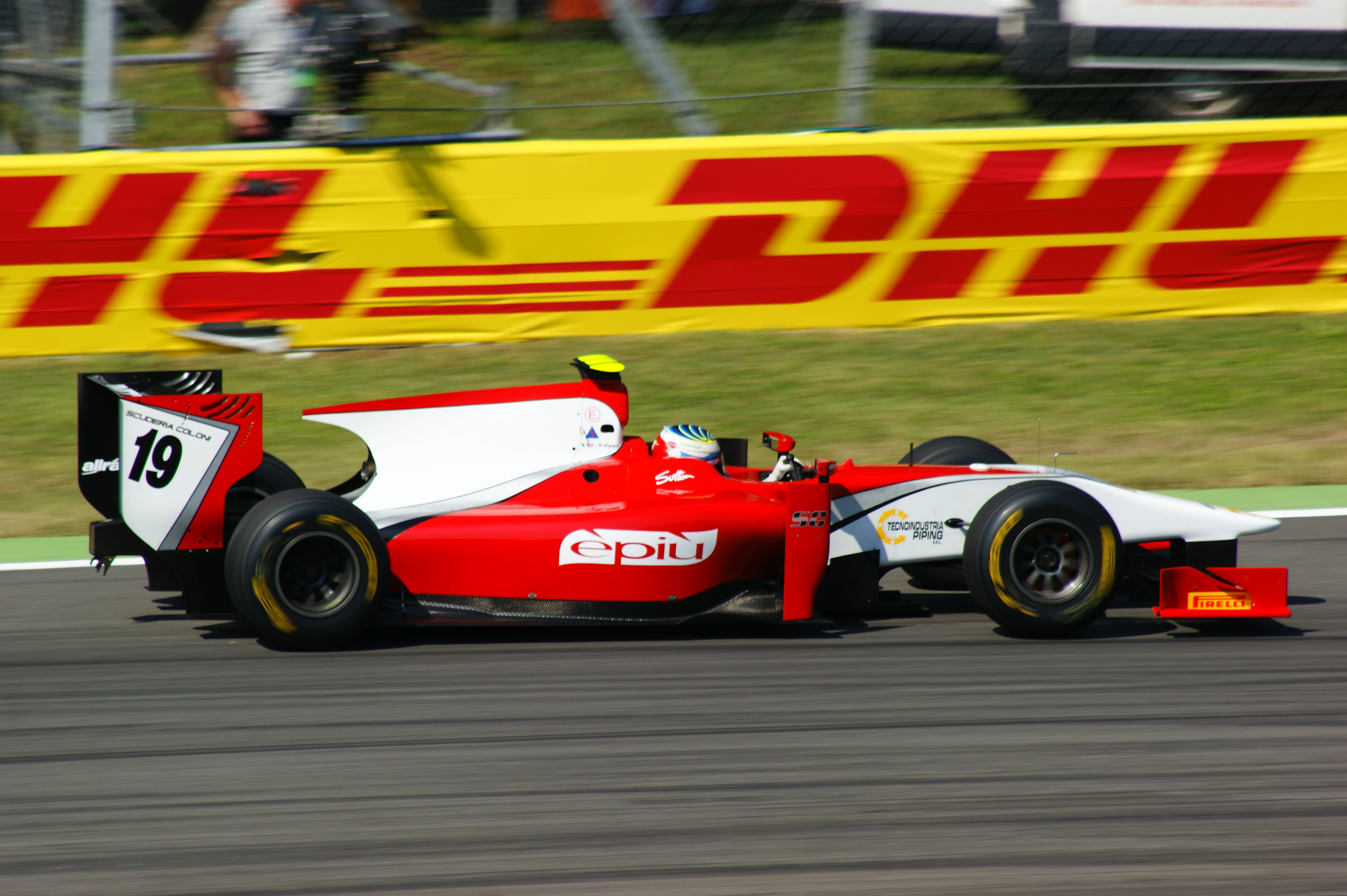
Luca Filippi in 2011.

The Monza GP2 round was a GP2 Series race that ran from on the Autodromo Nazionale Monza track in Monza, Italy.

== Winners ==
Year	Race	Driver	Team	Report
2005	Feature	(Finland) Heikki Kovalainen	Arden International	Report
2005	Sprint	(Switzerland) Neel Jani	Racing Engineering	Report
2006	Feature	(Italy) Giorgio Pantano	Petrol Ofisi FMS International	Report
2006	Sprint	(Italy) Giorgio Pantano	Petrol Ofisi FMS International	Report
2007	Feature	(Italy) Giorgio Pantano	Campos Grand Prix	Report
2007	Sprint	(Germany) Timo Glock	iSport International	Report
2008	Feature	(Brazil) Lucas di Grassi	Barwa International Campos Team	Report
2008	Sprint	(Italy) Davide Valsecchi	Durango	Report
2009	Feature	(Netherlands) Giedo van der Garde	iSport International	Report
2009	Sprint	(Brazil) Luiz Razia	Party Poker Racing.Com SC	Report
2010	Feature	(United Kingdom) Sam Bird	ART Grand Prix	Report
2010	Sprint	(Germany) Christian Vietoris	Racing Engineering	Report
2011	Feature	(Italy) Luca Filippi	Scuderia Coloni	Report
2011	Sprint	(Germany) Christian Vietoris	Racing Engineering	Report
2012	Feature	(Italy) Luca Filippi	Scuderia Coloni	Report
2012	Sprint	(Italy) Davide Valsecchi	DAMS	Report
2013	Feature	(Switzerland) Fabio Leimer	Racing Engineering	Report
2013	Sprint	(United Kingdom) Adrian Quaife-Hobbs	Hilmer Motorsport	Report
2014	Feature	(Belgium) Stoffel Vandoorne	ART Grand Prix	Report
2014	Sprint	(United Kingdom) Jolyon Palmer	DAMS	Report
2015	Feature	(United States) Alexander Rossi	Racing Engineering	Report
2015	Sprint	(New Zealand) Mitch Evans	Russian Time	Report
2016	Feature	(Italy) Antonio Giovinazzi	Prema Racing	Report
2016	Sprint	(France) Norman Nato	Racing Engineering	Report

== See also ==
- Italian Grand Prix
- Monza Formula 2 round
