= Monza Park =

Park in Monza, Italy

Coordinates: 45.602°N 9.284°E

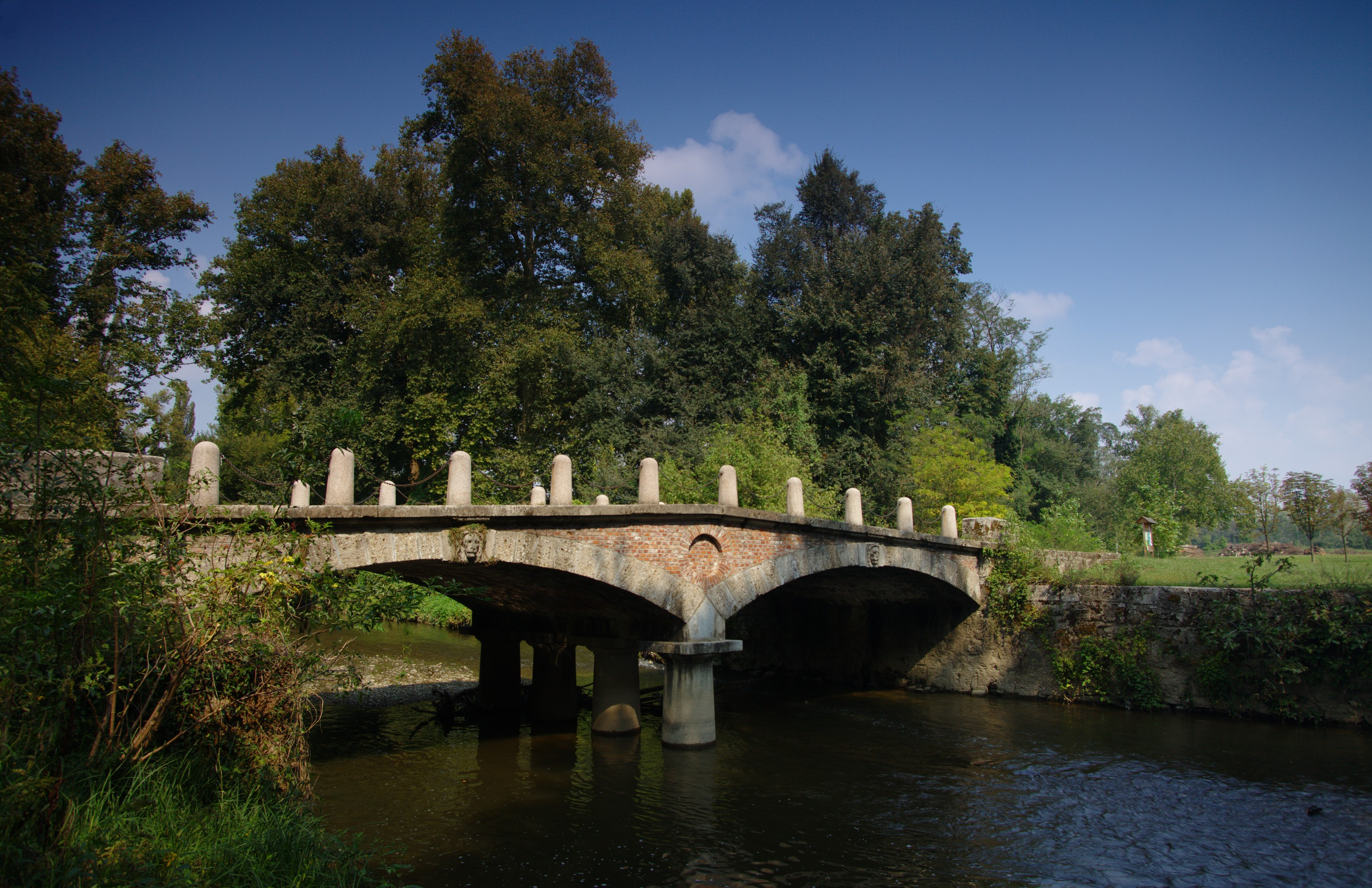
- A bridge over the River Lambro in the park
- Interactive map of Monza Park
- Type: Municipal
- Location: Monza
- Area: c. 688 ha
- Created: 1808
- Status: Open all year

Monza Park (Parco di Monza) is a large walled park in Monza, Lombardy, northern Italy. Extending over an area of 720 hectares (7.2 km^{2}), it is the largest walled park in Europe, and the fourth largest enclosed one after la Mandria of Venaria Reale (Italy), Richmond Park in London (England) and the Phoenix Park in Dublin (Ireland).

The park was commissioned in 1805 by Napoleon's stepson Eugène de Beauharnais, during the French occupation of northern Italy, as external part of the garden of his royal palace (the Royal Villa of Monza); it was completed in 1808.

The park is crossed in its southern sector by the Lambro river. Some one third of the park is occupied by woods, while the rest is kept as lawn.

The Autodromo Nazionale Monza racetrack has been located inside the park since 1922. Meanwhile, the Golf Club Milano is a golf course that has hosted nine editions of the Italian Open.
