= Guy Drouet =

French racing driver (1894–1985)

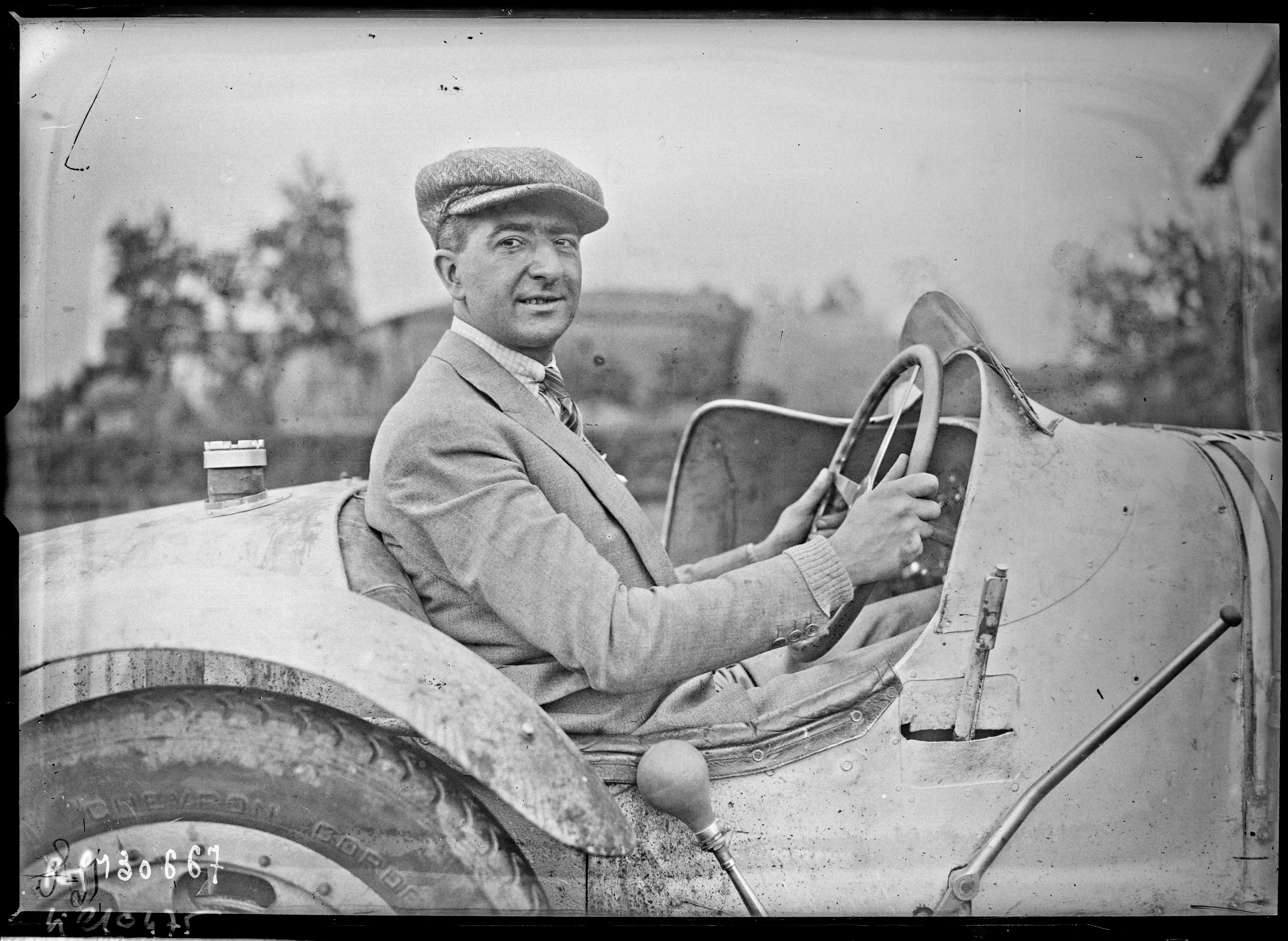
- On his Bugatti at the 1928 Grand Prix du Comminges
- Born: Roger Ernest Edouard Drouet; 7 August 1894 Paris, France
- Died: 15 April 1985 (aged 90) Paris

Roger Ernest Edouard "Guy" Drouet (7 August 1894 – 15 April 1985) was a French Grand Prix driver active in the late 1920s.

== Career ==
Drouet's first appearance of note was in his private Bugatti T37 at the 1927 Grand Prix de la Marne, finishing 3rd. Drouet only raced a handful of times, all between 1927 and 1929, and, apart from retiring in the 1928 French Grand Prix (which that year was for sportscars and almost entirely domestic) Drouet only took part in one Grand Epreuve - the 1928 Italian Grand Prix, also known as the European Grand Prix that season. Driving a Bugatti T35B, Drouet was fast and consistent, running in the top ten for most of the race; after the tragic accident in which Emilio Materassi and a number of spectators were killed, Drouet moved up to third, but was pipped to the position by Tazio Nuvolari, who finished fewer than 4 seconds ahead after nearly four hours of racing.
