= Monza Formula 2 round =

(Italy) Monza Formula 2 round

FIA Formula 2 Championship
- Venue: Autodromo Nazionale Monza
- Location: Monza, Italy
- First race: 2017
- Most wins (driver): (India) Jehan Daruvala (United Kingdom) Oliver Bearman (Paraguay) Joshua Dürksen (2)
- Most wins (team): (Italy) Prema Racing (7)
- Lap record: 1:32.717 ( (India) Kush Maini, (United Kingdom) Invicta Racing, Dallara F2 2024, 2024)

The Monza Formula 2 round is a FIA Formula 2 Championship series race that is run on the Autodromo Nazionale Monza in Italy.

== Winners ==
Year	Race	Driver	Team	Report
2017	Feature	(Italy) Antonio Fuoco	Prema Racing	Report
2017	Sprint	(Italy) Luca Ghiotto	Russian Time	Report
2018	Feature	(Japan) Tadasuke Makino	Russian Time	Report
2018	Sprint	(United Kingdom) George Russell	ART Grand Prix	Report
2019	Feature	(Japan) Nobuharu Matsushita	Carlin	Report
2019	Sprint	(United Kingdom) Jack Aitken	Campos Racing	Report
2020	Feature	(Germany) Mick Schumacher	Prema Racing	Report
2020	Sprint	(United Kingdom) Callum Ilott	UNI-Virtuosi	Report
2021	Sprint 1	(France) Théo Pourchaire	ART Grand Prix	Report
2021	Sprint 2	(India) Jehan Daruvala	Carlin	Report
2021	Feature	(Australia) Oscar Piastri	Prema Racing	Report
2022	Sprint	(Estonia) Jüri Vips	Hitech Grand Prix	Report
2022	Feature	(India) Jehan Daruvala	Prema Racing	Report
2023	Sprint	(Denmark) Frederik Vesti	Prema Racing	Report
2023	Feature	(United Kingdom) Oliver Bearman	Prema Racing	Report
2024	Sprint	(United Kingdom) Oliver Bearman	Prema Racing	Report
2024	Feature	(Brazil) Gabriel Bortoleto	Invicta Racing	Report
2025	Sprint	(Italy) Leonardo Fornaroli	Invicta Racing	Report
2025	Feature	(United Kingdom) Luke Browning	Hitech TGR	Report
2026	Sprint	(Paraguay) Joshua Dürksen	Invicta Racing	Report
2026	Feature	(Paraguay) Joshua Dürksen	Invicta Racing	Report

== See also ==
- Italian Grand Prix
- Monza GP2 round
