= Cesare Pastore =

Italian racing driver (1903–1942)

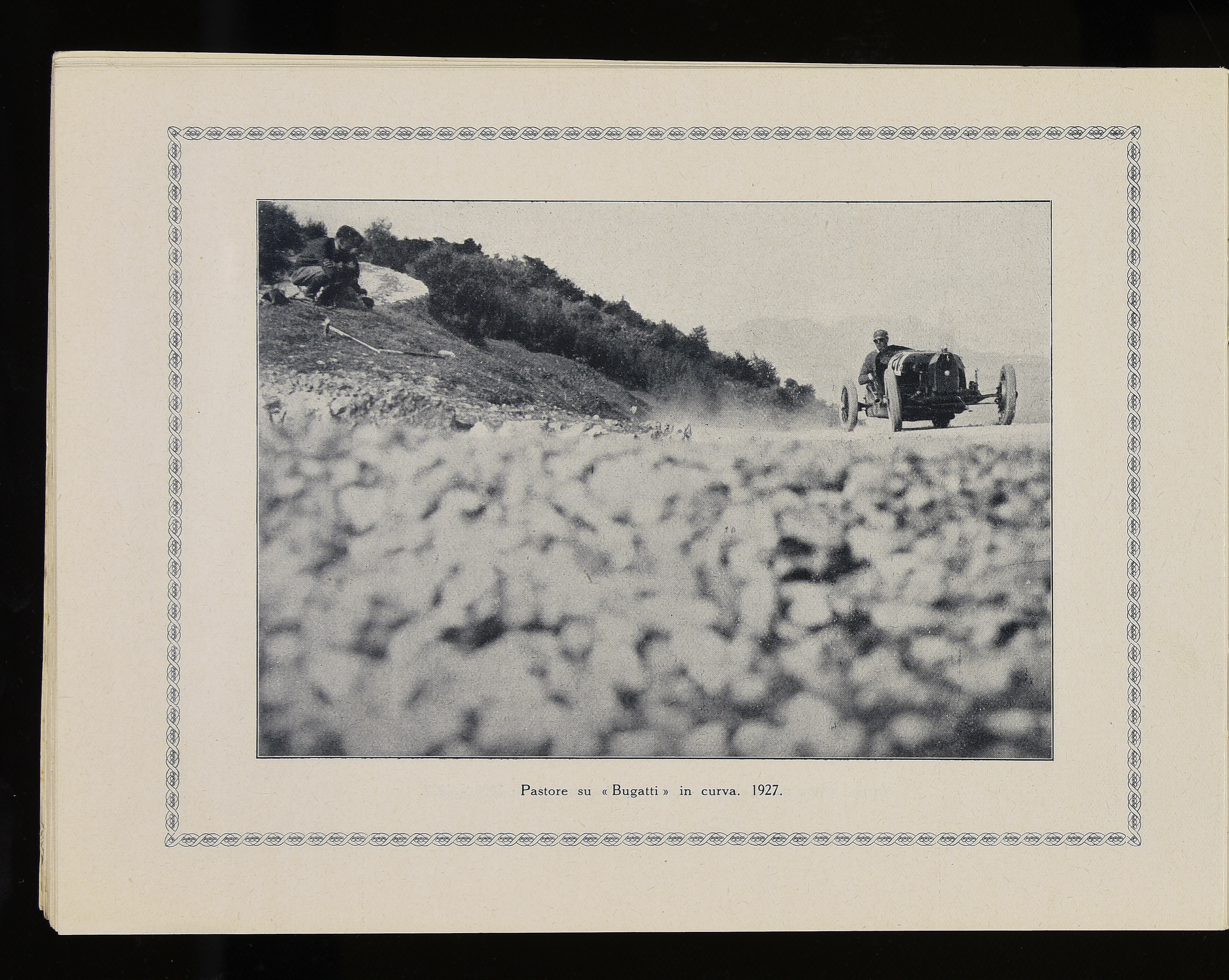
- In his Bugatti at the Trento-Bondone hillclimb in 1928
- Born: Cesare Battista Giuseppe Ignazio Sebastiano Domenico Alceo Pastore; 1903 Castiglione delle Stiviere, Italy
- Died: 8 November 1942 (aged 38–39) Bergamo, Italy

Cesare Pastore (1903–1942) was an Italian Grand Prix driver, whose career lasted from 1926 to 1932.

== Career ==
Pastore was the son of a wealthy industrialist and politician, Alceo Paolo Pastore (1858–1946); his great-uncle (also Cesare Pastore) had been a senator in Italy in the 19th century.

He started racing in hillclimbs in 1926, in a family Lancia Lambda. The following year he started racing in more advanced machinery, sharing a Bugatti T37A with fellow Mantuan Tazio Nuvolari, who at the time was transitioning from motorcycle racing. In 1928, Pastore's family funded the Scuderia Nuvolari team for Nuvolari and Pastore, and the team made its debut at the 1928 Gran Premio di Tripoli, with a third car for Achille Varzi. Pastore's Grand Epreuve debut ended in ignominy, crashing on the first lap of the race; Nuvolari went on to win.

With Pastore's Bugatti hors de combat, Pastore bought a Maserati Tipo 26 as replacement, being credited with a 9th-place finish in the 1928 Premio Reale di Roma, albeit Baconin Borzacchini had to take over the car as Pastore fell ill during the race.

After some successes in hillclimbs, Pastore was hired as reserve driver for Maserati at the 1928 Italian Grand Prix, and he relieved Aymo Maggi for 7 laps - with Borzacchini also taking a handful of laps - the trio being classified 5th.

Pastore made his Mille Miglia debut in 1929, in the family Lambda, but did not finish. In the 1930 race he shared a Maserati Tipo 26 with Luigi Arcangeli, and the pair led at Bologna, but a broken piston soon afterwards caused a retirement.

== Post-racing life ==
Pastore married in 1930 and was persuaded by his wife to retire from driving in 1932. Pastore later became a reserve piliot with the Regia Aeronautica and served in the Second World War as a reconnaissance pilot. On 8 November 1942, Pastore took off from Alghero, Sardinia, at the helm of a three-engine CANT Z.1007 Alcione, with 5 crew members. After a few minutes the craft went down in the Mediterranean Sea. No remains of the plane or its crew were ever found.
