= 1928 Italian Grand Prix =

- Race 2 of 2 in the 1928 World Manufacturers' Championship

Race details
- Date: September 9, 1928
- Official name: VIII Gran Premio d'Italia; VI Grand Prix d'Europe
- Location: Monza, Italy
- Course: Autodromo Nazionale di Monza
- Course length: 10.00 km (6.21 miles)
- Distance: 60 laps, 600.00 km (372.82 miles)

Pole position
Driver	(Italy) Baconin Borzacchini	
- Grid positions set by ballot

Fastest lap
Driver	(Italy) Luigi Arcangeli	Talbot
- Time: 3:37.4

Podium
First	(Monaco) Louis Chiron	Bugatti
Second	(Italy) Achille Varzi; (Italy) Giuseppe Campari	Alfa Romeo
Third	(Italy) Tazio Nuvolari	Bugatti

The 1928 Italian Grand Prix was a Grand Prix motor race run on 9 September 1928, at Monza. It was run over 60 laps, and was won by Louis Chiron driving a Bugatti 37A. It was the 8th Italian Grand Prix. This race was also the VI Grand Prix d'Europe.

This race was marred by the death of at least 22 spectators as well as driver Emilio Materassi on lap 17, when Materassi lost control of his car on the main straight at over 200 km/h while trying to overtake Giulio Foresti. The car swerved to the left of the track, bounced over a three-meter deep and four-meter wide protection ditch and a fence and crashed into the grandstand, killing him along with 22 spectators. Other sources have stated that 27 spectators were killed overall, but this is unconfirmed.

By either estimation this is the worst accident, with respect to the number of lives lost, to occur at a Grand Prix, and the second-deadliest in motor racing history, being surpassed by the 1955 Le Mans disaster. As a result the Italian Grand Prix was not held again until 1931.

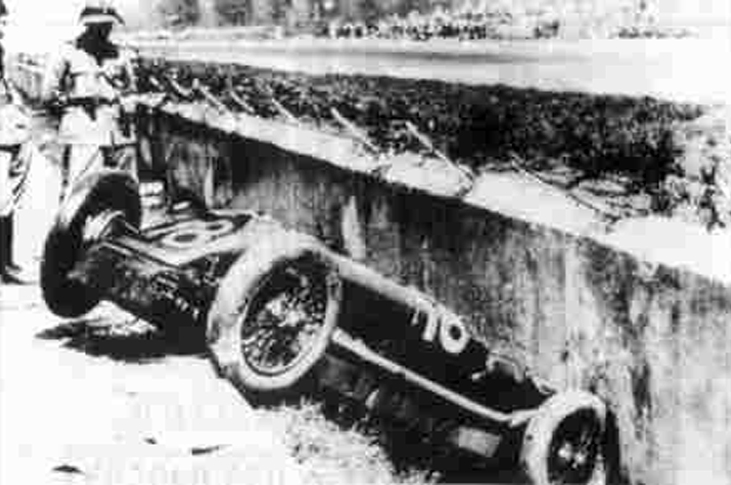
The fatal accident of Emilio Materassi during the race.

== Classification ==
Pos	No	Driver	Constructor	Laps	Time/Retired	Grid
1	50	(Monaco) Louis Chiron	Bugatti T37A	60	3:45:08.6	14
2	38	(Italy) Achille Varzi (Italy) Giuseppe Campari	Alfa Romeo P2	60	+2:20.4	21
3	26	(Italy) Tazio Nuvolari	Bugatti T35C	60	+14:37.2	9
4	40	(France) Guy Drouet	Bugatti T35B	60	+14:40.0	16
5	6	(Italy) Aymo Maggi (Italy) Cesare Pastore (Italy) Baconin Borzacchini	Maserati 26R (8C-1700)	60	+25:09.0	22
6	42	(Italy) Ernesto Maserati	Maserati 26R (8C-1700)	55	+5 laps	13
7	22	(France) Guy Bouriat	Bugatti T35	55	+5 laps	10
8	10	(Italy) Giulio Foresti	Bugatti T35C	54	+6 laps	2
NC	24	(Italy) Edoardo Probst	Bugatti T37A	45	+15 laps	7
NC	36	(France) J-C d'Ahetze	Bugatti T37A	40	+20 laps	12
Ret	2	(Italy) Baconin Borzacchini	Maserati 26R (8C-2000)	26	Wheel	1
Ret	28	(France) Pierre Blaque Belair	Bugatti T35C	24	+36 laps	11
Ret	46	(Italy) Luigi Arcangeli	Talbot 700	19	Withdrawn	17
Ret	44	(Italy) Antonio Brivio	Talbot 700	18	Withdrawn	20
Ret	8	(Italy) Gastone Brilli-Peri	Talbot 700	17	Withdrawn	5
Ret	18	(Italy) Emilio Materassi	Talbot 700	17	Fatal crash	3
Ret	48	(Italy) Gianfranco Comotti	Talbot 700	16	Withdrawn	19
Ret	32	(Italy) Carlo Tonini	Bugatti T35C	15	Mechanical	15
Ret	20	(Italy) Giulio Aymini	Delage 2LCV	14	Mechanical	6
Ret	12	(United Kingdom) William Grover-Williams	Bugatti T35C	5	Engine	4
Ret	30	(Italy) Cleto Nenzioni	Bugatti T37A	2	Mechanical	8
Ret	52	(Italy) Mario Piccolo	Maserati 26 (8C-1500)	1	Mechanical	18
DNA	4	(Argentina) Manuel Blancas	Bugatti T35B		Did not appear	
DNA	14	(Italy) Giuseppe Gilera	Bugatti T35		Did not appear	
DNA	16	(Italy) J. Ghica-Cantacuzene	Cozette Spl.		Did not appear	
DNA	34	(Italy) Ugo Stefanelli	Bugatti T35		Did not appear	
DNA	54	(Argentina) Manuel Ceratto	Delage 2LCV		Did not appear	
DNA	56	(Italy) Federico Fisauli	Maserati Tipo 26		Did not appear	
DNA	58	(Italy) Ruggiero Bisighin	Bugatti		Did not appear	
DNA	60	(Italy) Alberto Kechler	Alfa-Romeo 6C-1500		Did not appear	
DNA	62	(Italy) Roberto Serboli	Delage 2LCV		Did not appear	

Fastest Lap: Luigi Arcangeli, 3m37.4 (165.59 km/h)

Grand Prix Race
Previous race: 1928 Indianapolis 500	1928 Grand Prix season Grandes Épreuves	Next race: 1929 Indianapolis 500
Previous race: 1927 Italian Grand Prix	Italian Grand Prix	Next race: 1931 Italian Grand Prix
Previous race: 1927 Italian Grand Prix	European Grand Prix (Designated European Grand Prix)	Next race: 1930 Belgian Grand Prix
