= Villa Alari, Cernusco sul Naviglio =

Villa Alari
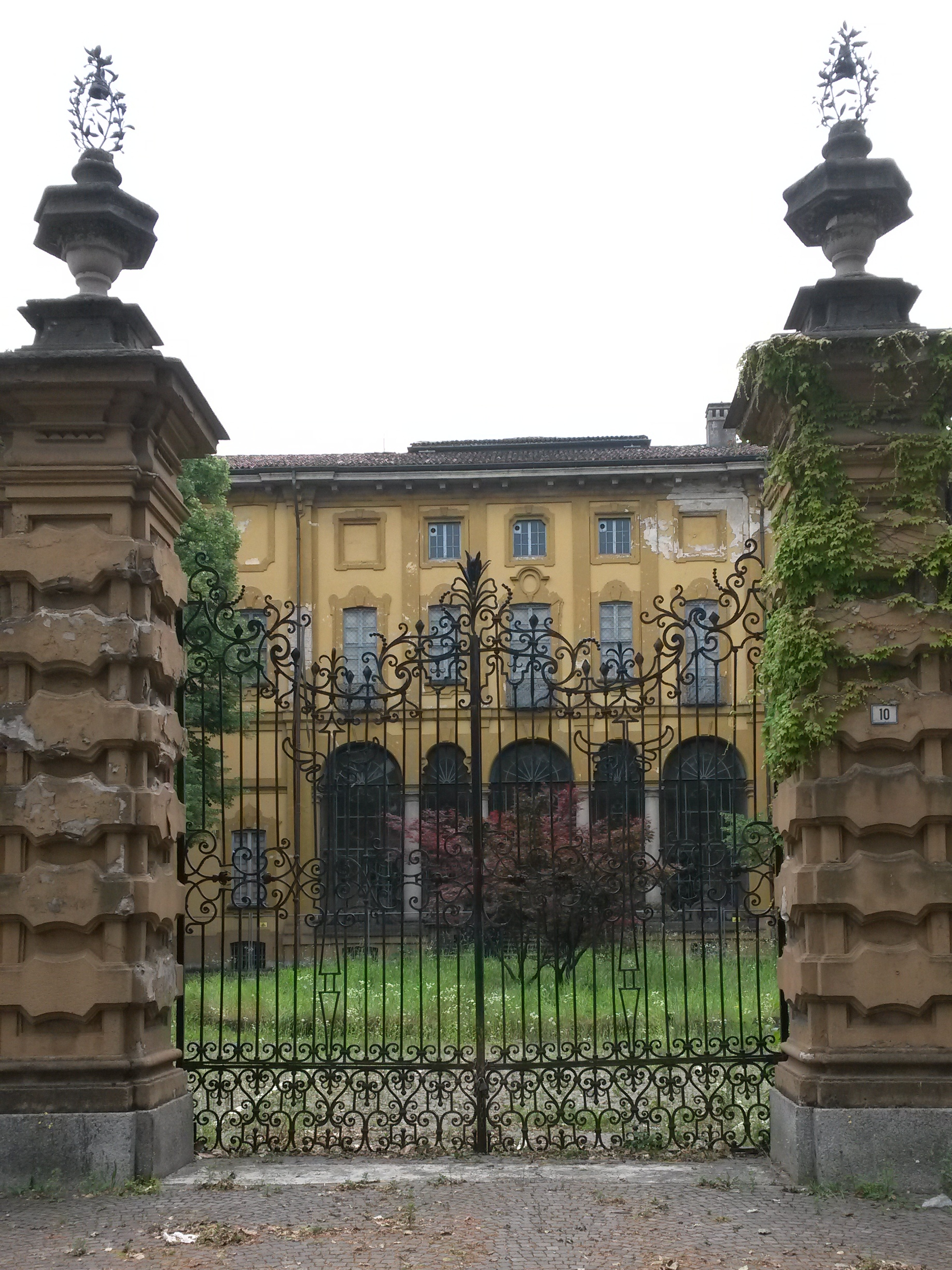
- Villa Alari in 2015
- Click on the map for a fullscreen view

General information
- Location: Cernusco sul Naviglio, Italy
- Coordinates: 45.5232°N 9.3341°E

Villa Alari, also known as the Villa Visconti di Saliceto, is a Rococo style rural palace in Cernusco sul Naviglio, in the Province of Milan, in the Region of Lombardy, Italy.

== History ==
Construction for the "villa di delizia" (or villa of delights) was begun in 1703 and concluded in 1719, commissioned by Giacinto Alari (1668-1753) from the architect Giovanni Ruggeri. The piano nobile was decorated with stucco and frescoes in 1720–1725. The design of the interior decoration is also assigned to Ruggeri, but the mythologic and allegoric frescoes were completed with the help of Giovanni Angelo Borroni, Francesco Fabbrica, Pietro Maggi, Salvatore Bianchi, Giovanni Antonio Cucchi, and Francesco Bianchi. At one time the private rooms had genre and pastoral paintings respectively by the painters Enrico Albricci and Francesco Londonio. Fabbrica, for example, frescoed the Triumph of Apollo in the main ball room.

In 1772 to 1776, the villa was used by the Archduke Ferdinand, Governor of the Austrian Duchy of Milan. The Alari attempted, but failed to sell the villa to the Archduke.

After the death of Saulo Alari in 1831, the villa was sold to the Visconti di Saliceto. The last heir of this family, the Countess Valentina Visconti of Saliceto, left the villa in 1944 to the Fatebenefratelli Hospital which used it first as a psychiatric hospital and then as a nursing home. Since 2007 the villa has been a municipal property.
