= Royal Villa of Monza =

Former royal residence in Monza, Italy

Coordinates: 45.593437°N 9.274183°E

- Villa Reale
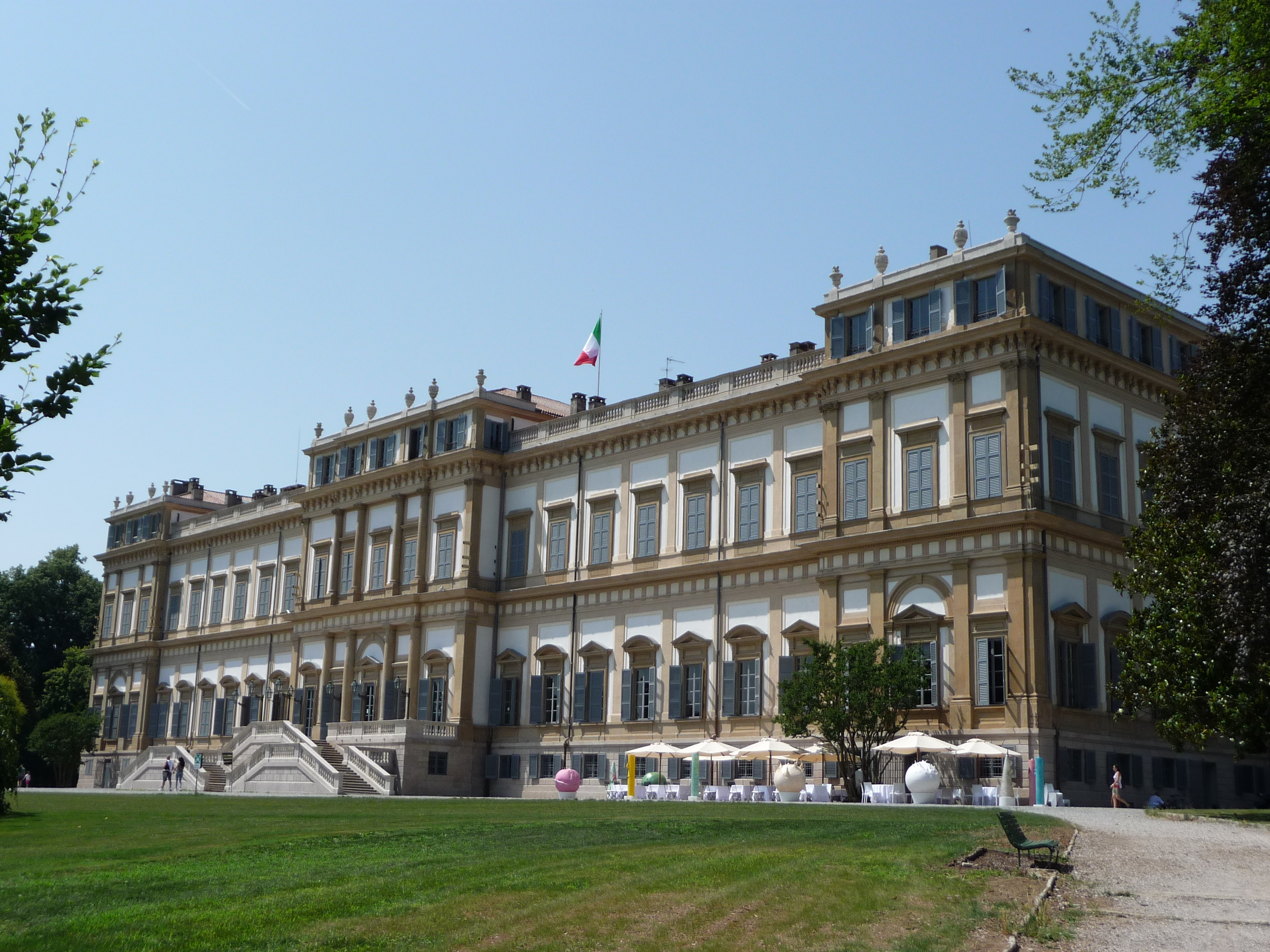
- Garden façade

General information
- Architectural style: Neoclassical
- Address: Viale Brianza, 2
- Town or city: Monza
- Country: Italy
- Year(s) built: 1777–1780

Design and construction
- Architect(s): Giuseppe Piermarini
- Main contractor: Maria Theresa of Austria

Renovating team
- Architect(s): Luigi Canonica

The Royal Villa (Italian: Villa Reale) is a historical building in Monza, Northern Italy. It lies on the banks of the Lambro river, surrounded by the large Monza Park, one of the largest enclosed parks in Europe.

The Royal Villa, also called the Palace of Monza, is a neoclassical palace built by the Habsburgs as a private residence during the Austrian domination of the 18th century. It became the residence of the viceroy with the Napoleonic Kingdom of Italy and during the Kingdom of Lombardy-Venetia, but it lost this function during the Kingdom of Italy of the House of Savoy, the last royals to use it.

The Royal Villa was abandoned by the royal family following the murder of King Umberto I in Monza on 29 July 1900 by anarchist Gaetano Bresci. Nowadays, it hosts exhibitions; a wing hosts also the Artistic High School of Monza.

== History ==
=== The building ===
The construction of the Villa of Monza was commissioned by the Empress Maria Theresa of Austria to be the summer residence for the Archduke Ferdinand of Austria, governor of the Duchy of Milan. He had initially settled in the Villa Alari, Cernusco sul Naviglio, rented from the Alari Counts. The choice of Monza was due to the salubrity of the air and the amenity of the country, but also because it represents a symbolic link between Vienna and Milan, being the place on the way to the imperial capital.

It was originally built by Giuseppe Piermarini between 1777 and 1780, while the realization of the gardens took a few more years. Later, the young Archduke Ferdinand ordered many additions to the complex, again by Piermarini, and used the villa as his country residence until the arrival of the French army in 1796.

Piermarini took inspiration from Schönbrunn Palace and the Royal Palace of Caserta realized by his master Luigi Vanvitelli. Schönbrunn's inverted U-shaped plan is reused and combines the strong scenographic impact that the side wings give to the main façade, the distributional comfort (the central body is used for representation functions, the side wings for private apartments, and the avant-corps for service functions). Unlike the other imperial palaces, the east–west orientation of the façades is preferred here, in place of the classic north–south orientation that guaranteed greater solar radiation. Maybe this choice aimed to ensure a cooler temperature in the villa's rooms or to orient the façade that overlooks the gardens towards the imperial capital. The extension is really vast: 700 rooms for a total of 22,000 m².

=== Napoleonic period ===
Following the establishment of the Napoleonic Kingdom of Italy, the building was used as a royal palace and became home to the viceroy of Italy, Eugène de Beauharnais.

The new Viceroy commissioned the architect Luigi Canonica to improve the structure of the villa, including the construction of the theatre on the north wing.

It was always at the behest of Beauharnais that, between 1806 and 1808, the complex of the villa and its gardens was extended in size, through the construction of the vast fenced park called "Monza Park"; in fact, it was between 1807 and 1808 that the current 14 km long wall was built, using the demolition material of the ancient Visconti castle.

=== A new Austrian period ===
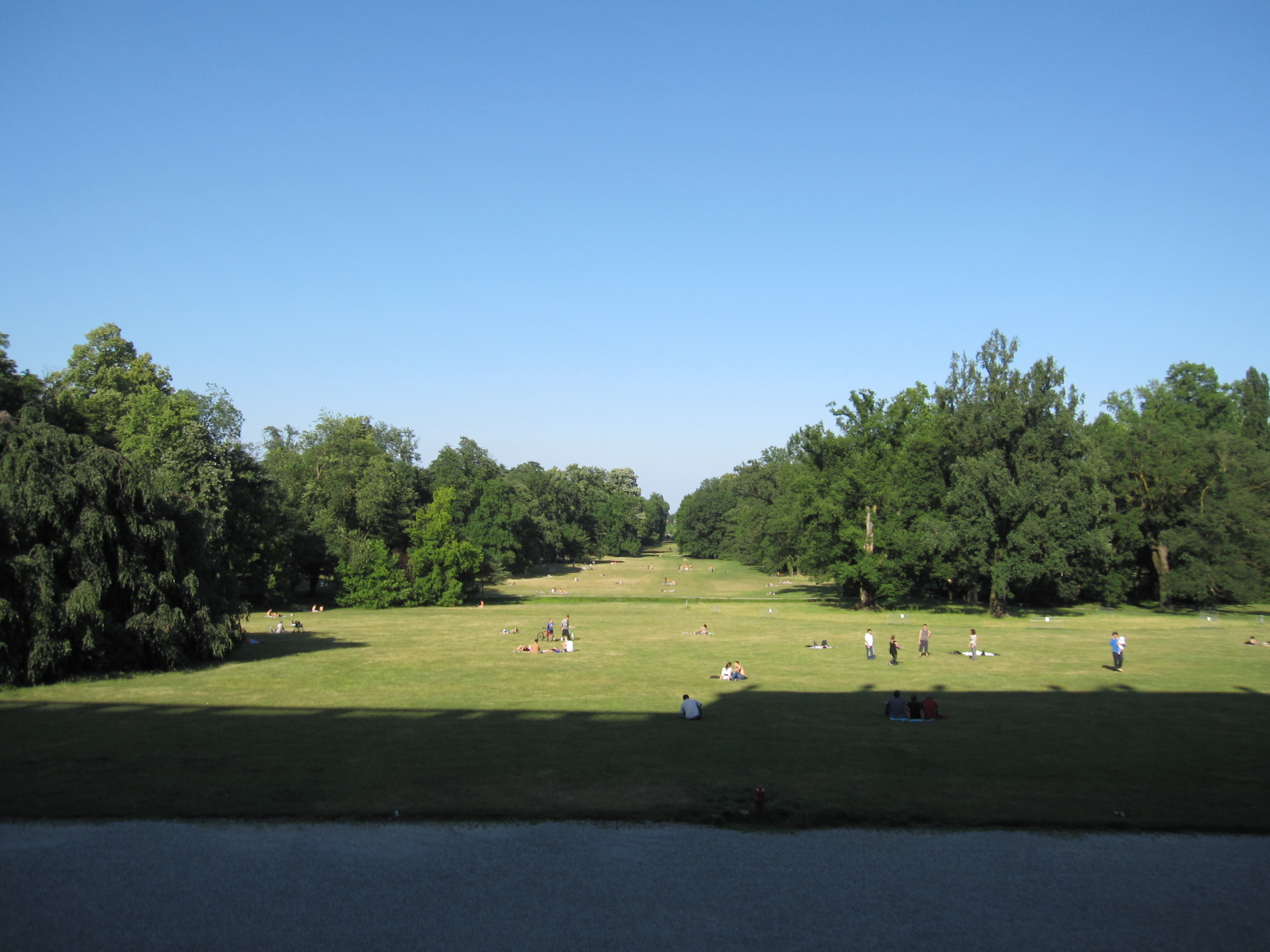
Monza Park

With the fall of the First French Empire (1814), Austria annexed the Italian territories to the Kingdom of Lombardy-Venetia and Monza was included in the province of Milan.

The new Viceroy was Archduke Rainer Joseph of Austria.

Archduke Rainer was passionate about botany and thanks to his contribution the park and the gardens became rich in new species.

In 1819 a school was opened in the park to train professional gardeners to care for the gardens of imperial residences. The Archduke commissioned the architect Giacomo Tazzini to modernize the villa. He worked in particular on the apartments reserved for the Archduke's sons and daughters, on the floors, which were enriched with refined decorations, and on the bathrooms.

Rainer left Monza in 1848 and Marshal Radetzky settled there.

In 1857 Archduke Maximilian of Austria, the new viceroy of Lombardy-Venetia, occupied the villa sporadically for only two years, definitively closing the Austrian period of the Royal Villa.

=== Italian Kingdom ===
In 1861, when the new Kingdom of Italy was established, the building became a palace of the Italian Royal House of Savoy.

In 1868 the villa was donated by Victor Emmanuel II to his son, the future Umberto I on the occasion of his marriage to Margherita of Savoy. The villa was a very welcome gift and was immediately used by the royal couple; after the death of King Victor Emmanuel, modernization works, cured by the architects Achille Majnoni d'Intignano and Luigi Tarantola, were undertaken.

The Royal Villa was abandoned by the royal family in 1900, after the murder of King Umberto I on 29 July 1900. The King was assassinated in Monza by Gaetano Bresci while he was attending a sports event organized by the club "Forti e Liberi".

After the mournful event, the new king, Victor Emmanuel III no longer wanted to use the Royal Villa, closing it and transferring most of the furnishings to the Quirinal Palace.

=== 20th century ===
In 1934 Victor Emmanuel III donated most of the villa to the municipalities of Monza and Milan by royal decree.

He still kept the southern portion with the halls of his father's apartment, King Umberto I, but constantly closed in his memory.

During the Italian Social Republic, it was the seat of command of the Republican National Guard.

The events of the immediate post-war period of World War II provoked occupations and the decay of the monument.

Since the birth of the Republic, the south wing has been administered by the state, while the rest of the villa is jointly administered by the Municipalities of Monza and the Lombardy Region.

=== 21st century ===
In 2012, after a long period of degradation, also due to the fragmentation of the administrations, the renovation work on the central body, on the north and south wings and for the construction of the technical area outside the villa on the north side and the recovery of the Courtyard of Honor began.

The consolidation of the walls of the ground floor, the restoration and consolidation of vaults and wooden floors, the execution of extraordinary maintenance works for the safety of the court, and the restoration of the pavement, the gate and the south façade of the north area were programmed. In addition, the project provided for the redevelopment of the Belvedere curated by the architect Michele De Lucchi and the restoration of the rooms on the ground floor.

The works ended on 26th June 2014 and the inauguration was on 8 September 2014.

Now you can visit the royal apartments of Umberto I and Margherita of Savoy that still retain part of the original furnishing, in addition to the representative rooms and other private apartments set up for the visit of Wilhelm II, German Emperor in 1889, for the Prince of Naples, the future Victor Emmanuel III, and the Duchess of Genoa, Princess Elisabeth of Saxony, mother of Queen Margherita.

The villa, the royal gardens, and the park are managed by a consortium (Consorzio Villa Reale and Parco di Monza).

=== The Royal Villa of Monza as branch offices of ministries ===
From 23 July 2011, the villa hosted the branch offices of four ministries (Economy and Finance, Reforms, Simplification and Tourism). The following 19 October, the Court of Rome annulled the decrees establishing the peripheral offices of the ministries at the Villa Reale for anti-union conduct since these offices had been established without involving the trade unions and/or without previous activation, as required by law, of consultation with trade unions. With the fall of Prime Minister Silvio Berlusconi's fourth government, the branches in question were finally abolished by Prime Minister Mario Monti.

== Architecture ==
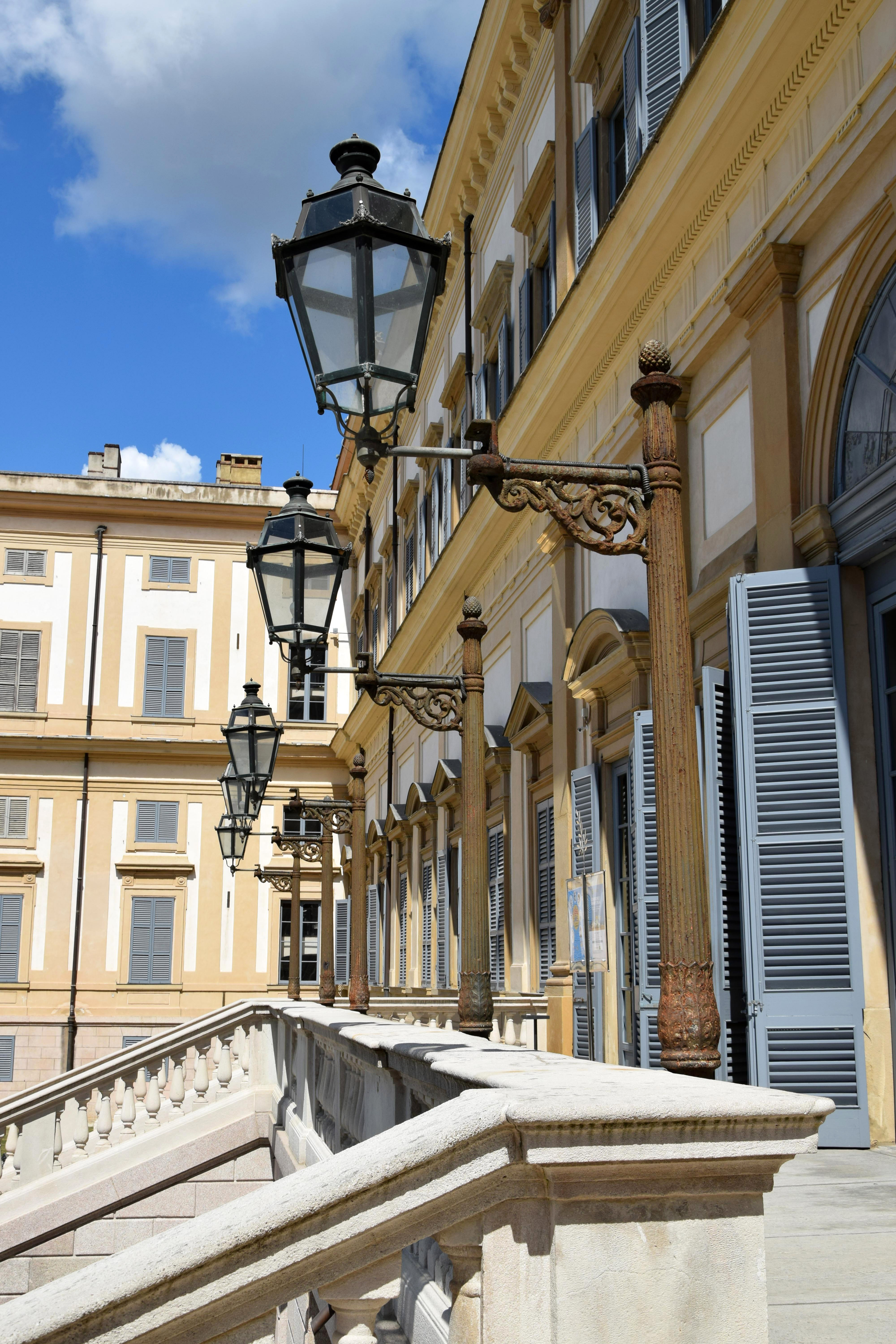
Façade detail

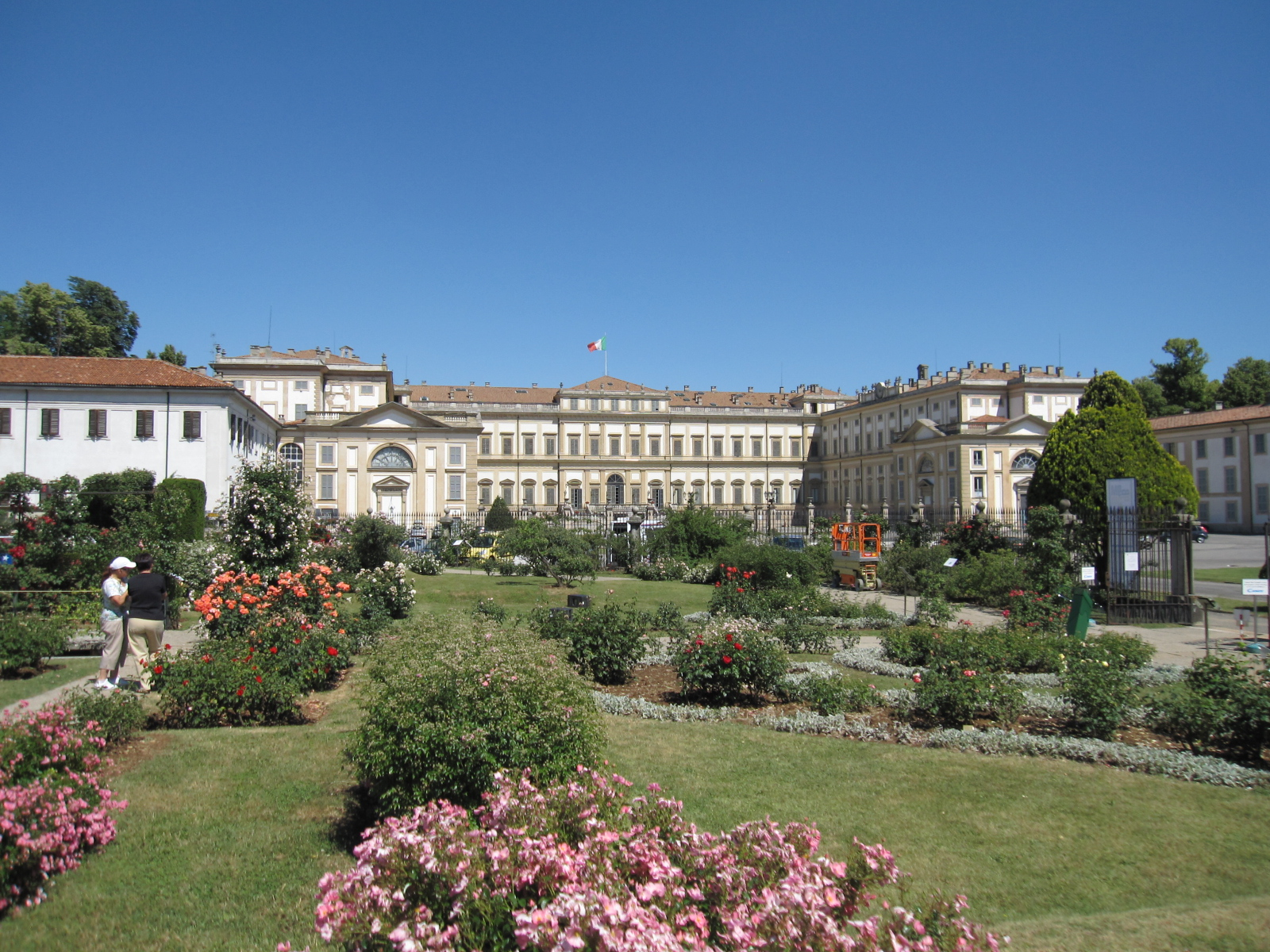
Gardens of the Royal Villa of Monza

Piermarini created a neoclassical building adapted to the needs of suburban reality. The palace complex includes the Cappella Reale, or the "Royal Chapel", the Cavallerizza (horse-shed), the Rotonda dell'Appiani, the Teatrino di Corte ("Small Court Theatre") and the Orangerie. The rooms at the first floor include grand salons and halls, and the Royal apartments of King Umberto I and of Queen Margherita of Savoy. In front of the palace are the royal gardens, designed by Piermarini as English landscape gardens.

The three main bodies, arranged in U-shape, delimit a large court of honor closed at the end by the two cubic volumes of the Chapel and the Cavallerizza, from which the lower wings of the service buildings start: this defines a rational space, consisting of the orderly arrangement of the volumes that intersect orthogonally and that, progressively, develop in height.

The decoration of the façades, renouncing colonnades and relief tiles, is extremely rigorous. The stylistic essentiality of the building is due not only to precise taste choices but also to political reasons: the court in Vienna preferred to avoid excessive ostentation of wealth and power in an occupied country.

The interiors also accord with the principles of rationality and simplicity that characterizes the entire project. In particular, their functionality is a key point: the corridors, for example, are cut to serve independently various rooms used for different uses.

The interior decoration is entrusted to the main masters of the newly formed Brera Academy, founded by Archduke Ferdinand in 1776. In particular, the stuccoes and decorations of the representative rooms are made by Giocondo Albertolli, the frescoes and paintings by Giuseppe Levati and Giulio Traballesi, floors and furniture by Giuseppe Maggiolini.

=== Orangery of the Oranges ===
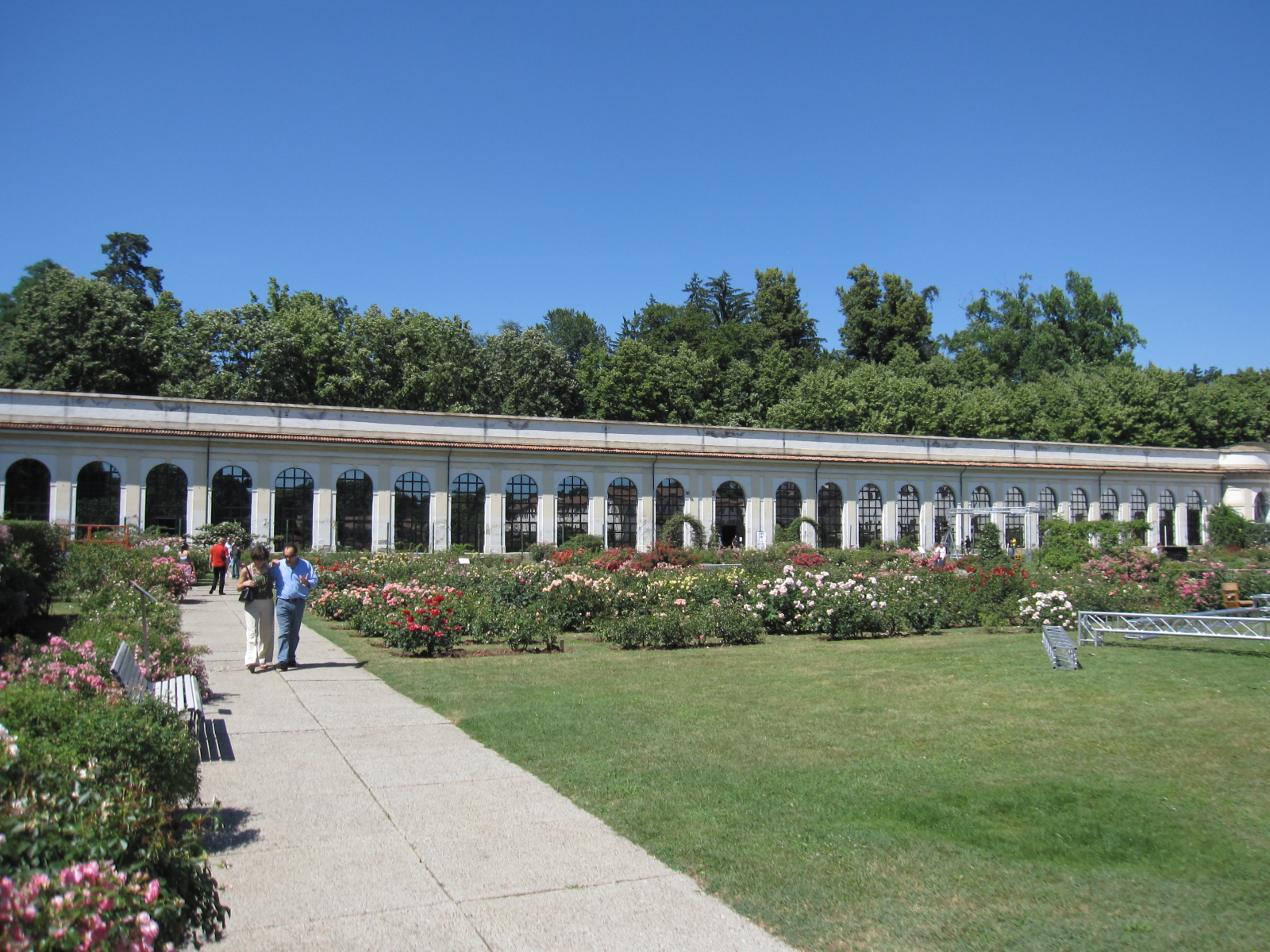
Villa Orangery

The greenhouses, called Orangerie in the original Piermarinian project and now commonly known as the Serrone, was built in 1790. Commissioned by Archduke Ferdinand of Austria-Este on the occasion of the twentieth anniversary of his wedding to Maria Beatrice Ricciarda d'Este, it was designed on the model of the Orangerie of the Schönbrunn Palace. Located on the north side of the villa, it was connected to the palace via a corridor called "Passage of the Ladies". A small circular room, now called Rotonda dell'Appiani, introduced to the large greenhouse.

The building is exposed and receives light from the south from a long series of windows.

In the second half of the 20th century, right in front of the Serrone, a vast rose garden, the Niso Fumagalli Rose Garden, was established. Here a floral competition, organized by the Italian Association of roses, was held annually in May.

After the restoration, the building is now intended for temporary art exhibitions.

== Events at the Royal Villa of Monza ==
Annually, on 24 June in conjunction with the patron saint of the city, San Giovanni Battista, a fireworks show is organized to the rhythm of the music on the lawn of the Villa Reale or inside the Park of Monza. There have also been numerous concerts and sporting events attended by famous stars of music, sport and entertainment.

== The Consortium ==
The Consortium was constituted on 20 July 2009 to promote an optimal use of the Royal Residence of Monza (Reggia di Monza), consisting of the Royal Palace (Villa Reale) and its surrounding park. The aim was to restore the palace and park and ensure regular conservative maintenance, to enable and improve public fruition. The consortium began its activities on 9 September and it brings together the institutional owners of the various sections of the palace and park: the State (the Ministry of Cultural Assets and Tourism), the Region of Lombardy, the Municipality of Monza and the Municipality of Milan. Though the Chamber of Commerce of Monza and Brianza and the Province of Monza and Brianza do not hold ownership rights within the historical site, they adhered from the beginning. In 2014 the Federation of Industries (Confindustria) of Monza and Brianza joined the governance of the Consortium.

The Consortium is a no-profit organization and may cooperate with universities and Italian or foreign institutes to promote and support research applied to the field of the safeguarding and fruition of cultural assets and landscape. It proposes to encourage the development of tourism in the historical buildings of Brianza, in collaboration with businesses and administrations of the territory. Its goals also include the creation of new museums, art exhibitions and performances of particular value. Its nature is not entrepreneurial, but it may produce and sell services that are aligned with its goals and can receive donations and public or private contributions, with possible tax benefits for the donors.
