= Bob Tullius =

American race car driver (1930–2026)

- Born: Robert Charles Tullius; December 7, 1930 Rochester, New York, U.S.
- Died: March 16, 2026 (aged 95) Port Orange, Florida, U.S
- Years active: 1961–1986

Robert Charles Tullius (December 7, 1930 – March 16, 2026) was an American race car driver and racing team owner.

== Early years ==
Tullius considered a career in teaching after graduating from high school. He served a term in the U.S. Air Force, and while there quarterbacked the Chanute Air Force base football team until a leg injury put an end to his playing.

Tullius took a job in sales with Kodak, first in Rochester, New York and later in Alexandria, Virginia.

In 1960, Tullius bought a Triumph TR3 for his wife. She rarely drove the car. Tullius took the TR3 to racing school himself, and won the graduation race.

== Motorsports career ==
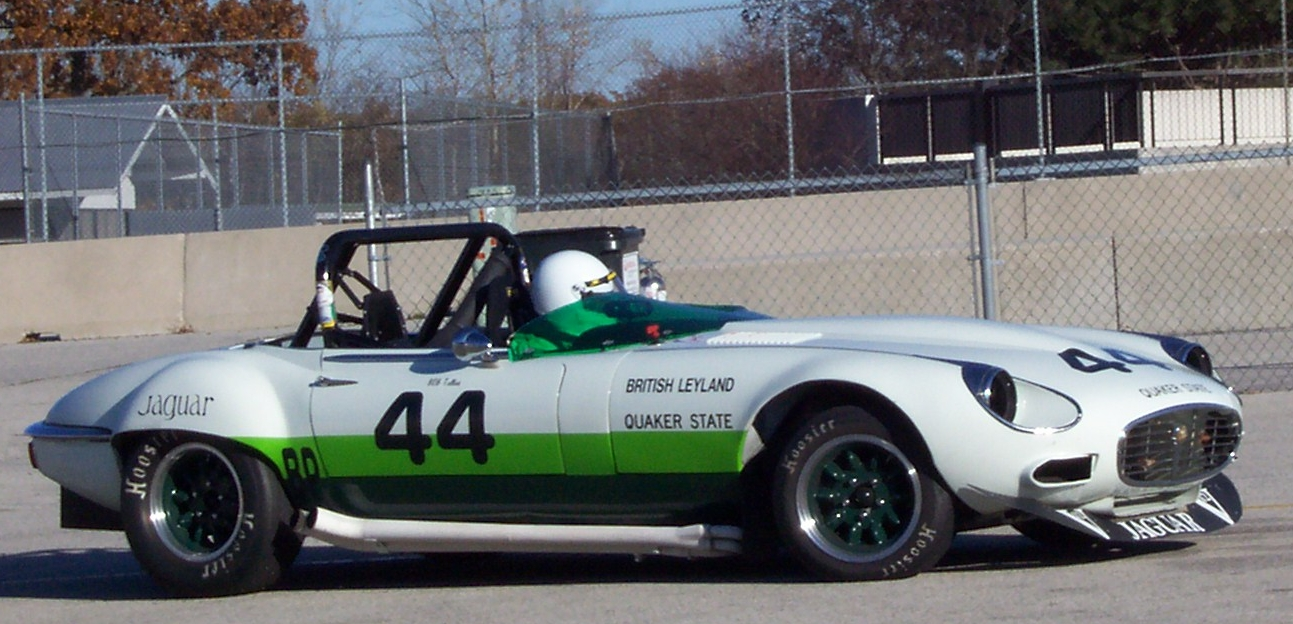
Tullius' 1975 championship winning Jaguar V-12 E-Type.

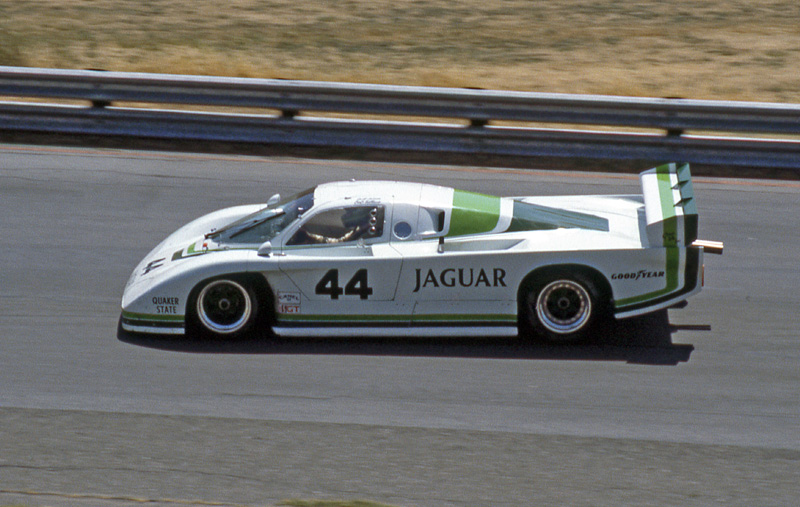
Tullius' Jaguar XJR-5 at the 1983 IMSA Camel GT race, Sears Point Raceway Sonoma, Calif.

Tullius' racing career began in earnest in 1961, when in his first four races he finished first or second, and won the points championship. For 1962, Tullius asked Triumph to provide him with a TR4 to race, promising to "beat the pants off [their] TR4s with [his] TR3" unless they did. Tullius and Ed Diehl built the proffered TR4 into a racer. Tullius placed second in the TR4 in its first race at Lime Rock, but on its next outing at Lake Garnett, the car was totaled. When Triumph refused to replace the car, Tullius and Diehl bought two more wrecked TR4s and built a replacement car using parts from all three.

Tullius' decision to pursue motorsports professionally was made in 1963. His supervisor at Kodak forced Tullius to choose between his day job and racing; Tullius opted for racing. He soon became the principal driver for Triumph's North American Competition Director Kas Kastner. In 1963, he also raced in his first 12 Hours of Sebring and went on to win six SCCA championship races in the factory TR4.

=== Group 44 ===
In 1965, Tullius established his own racing team, named Group 44 Incorporated, to pursue his chosen vocation while supporting his family. Co-founders included mechanic Brian Fuerstenau and New York advertising executive Dick Gilmartin, both of whom were also race drivers. Gilmartin left Group 44 in 1965.

In 1963, the three future founders were sitting in a motel in Sebring working on a name for their team. Gilmartin took a napkin and wrote "Group" on it for the three of them, the "44" was contributed by Tullius, and finally "Incorporated". Tullius originally asked the SCCA for permission to use the number 1 on his cars because it could be applied with a single line of tape, but was denied. "44" was also taken, so he began using "444", and dropped the third numeral later. At Lime Rock, Tullius' wife cut one of the numerals backwards and, lacking a sheet of contact paper to recut it, cut the second "4" in the same way, so that Tullius raced with a reversed "44". He continued to run cars with some numbers reversed after that.

Group 44 developed a three-pronged approach to their business. They raced their own cars, built racing cars for paying customers, and ran an extensive marketing and sponsoring department for vehicle manufacturers and racing teams. The company originally used a color scheme of white with black stripes, but added a green stripe when Quaker State motor oil, a division of Royal Dutch Shell, became a sponsor. This sponsorship lasted for several decades. The cars were not only well prepared, but immaculately presented. The team also used a unique articulated transporter painted in team colors to ferry their cars between races.

For most of the years it was active, Group 44 was exclusively associated with vehicles from British Leyland, initially fielding Triumph TRs and Spitfires and later campaigning models from MG and Jaguar. When Group 44 entered two Jaguar XJR-5 cars in the 1984 24 Hours of Le Mans, it was the first time a Jaguar had raced at Le Mans in 27 years. When Group 44 cars traveled to an event their cars were displayed at the local British Leyland dealers and the team was promoted through local media. For a time almost all of British Leyland's marketing in the United States went through Group 44.

After Group 44 lost the Jaguar GTP program to Tom Walkinshaw Racing, the team was retained to prepare and field a set of three Audi 200 Quattros in the Trans Am Series. Driver Hurley Haywood won the series drivers' championship in 1988.

Group 44 continued to operate until 1990, only shutting down when the last of their sponsorship contracts expired. The team won 14 national SCCA championships and three Trans Am titles. Among the more than 300 race victories there are also eleven successes in IMSA GTP championship races.

=== Other racing ===
Tullius personally raced cars from a wide range of manufacturers, including Alpine, AMC, Chevrolet, Dodge, Oldsmobile, Pontiac, Plymouth, Porsche, Ferrari, and Ford.

At the inaugural Trans Am Sedan Championship race on March 25, 1966 at Sebring, Tullius finished second overall and first in the Over 2.0 Litre class in a Dodge Dart. In the final years of Trans Am, Tullius drove Herb Adams' Gray Ghost Pontiac Tempest.

Tullius drove competitively until 1988, with his final win coming at the 1986 3 Hours of Daytona. He appeared in no fewer than 252 races, winning 38 and posting 43 class wins. In 1965 and 1975, he won the overall standings of the SCCA Championships and in 1977 and 1978, the overall ratings of the category I of the Trans Am Series. In the 1983 IMSA GTP series, he finished in second place behind Al Holbert. Three times he was on the pole of the 24 Hours of Le Mans, where he also won the 1985 GTP class with a 13th-place finish. His best showing at Sebring was a fourth place in 1985.

== Post-racing ==
Tullius bought the final TR6 and TR8s built by British Leyland when production of those makes of automobiles ceased.

In 1969, Tullius developed an interest in aviation which he continued to pursue after retiring from racing. He became a World War II airplane enthusiast, and participated in several Warbird Air Shows. He also took part in the Young Eagles program operated by the Experimental Aircraft Association (EAA).

Tullius' personal hangar in Sebring, Florida held several of his own aircraft. Among them were a North American T-6 Texan, a Fairchild PT-26A, a Waco ZPF-6 biplane, and a Beechcraft King Air twin in which he had logged several thousand hours of pilot-in-command time. Tullius also owned a Mustang P-51D, which he donated to the Royal Air Force Museum. Other planes reported to have been in the hangar were a Stearman and a North American T-28 Trojan. A selection of original Group 44 cars shared space in the hangar with the planes.

== Personal life and death ==
In 1972, Tullius was in Bangkok visiting a friend when he was struck in the street by a chauffeur-driven car and injured.

Tullius had a son and a daughter. His son, Russel, died on November 4, 2021, at the age of 62.

Bob Tullius died in Port Orange, Florida on March 16, 2026, at the age of 95.

== Honors ==
- Tullius was inducted into the Sebring Hall of Fame in 2014.
- He became a member of the SCCA Hall of Fame in 2015.
- He entered the British Sports Car Hall of Fame in 2017.
- In 2018, he was inducted into the Motorsports Hall of Fame of America.
- In 2025, he was inducted into the Trans Am Series Hall of Fame.

== Racing record ==
=== Le Mans results ===
Year	Team	Car	Teammate	Teammate	Placement	Cause of retirement
1964	(United Kingdom) Triumph Motor Company	Triumph Spitfire	(United States) Michael Rothschild		DNF	Accident
1968	(United States) Howmet Castings	Howmet TX	(United Kingdom) Hugh Dibley		Disqualified	
1984	(United States) Jaguar Group 44	Jaguar XJR-5	(United States) Doc Bundy	(United States) Brian Redman	DNF	Transmission failure
1985	(United States) Jaguar Group 44	Jaguar XJR-5	(France) Claude Ballot-Léna	(United States) Chip Robinson	13th, Class win	

=== Sebring results ===
Year	Team	Car	Teammate	Teammate	Placement	Cause of retirement
1963	(United Kingdom) Triumph Motor Company	Triumph TR4	(United States) Bruce Kellner	(United States) Lew Spencer	32nd	
1964	(United States) Autosport International	Alpine M63	(United States) Ray Cuomo		DNF	Transmission failure
1965	(United Kingdom) Triumph Motor Company	Triumph Spitfire	(United States) Charlie Gates		30th	
1966	(United Kingdom) Triumph Motor Company	Triumph TR4A	(United States) Charlie Gates		DNF	Engine failure
1968	(United Kingdom) British Leyland	Triumph TR250K	(United States) Jim Dittemore		DNF	Suspension
1969	(United States) Wilton Jowett	Chevrolet Camaro	(United States) Wilton Jowett		45th	
1970	(United States) Bruce Jennings	Porsche 911T	(United States) Bruce Jennings		DNF	Engine failure
1973	(United States) Murray Racing Team	Chevrolet Corvette	(United States) Ike Knupp		DNF	Engine failure
1980	(United States) Group 44	Triumph TR8	(Canada) Bill Adam		6th, Class win	
1981	(United States) Group 44	Triumph TR8	(Canada) Bill Adam		10th	
1983	(United States) Group 44	Jaguar XJR-5	(Canada) Bill Adam		DNF	Engine failure
1984	(United States) Group 44	Jaguar XJR-5	(United States) Doc Bundy		DNF	Ignition damage
1985	(United States) Group 44	Jaguar XJR-5	(United States) Chip Robinson		4th	
1986	(United States) Group 44	Jaguar XJR-7	(United States) Chip Robinson	(France) Claude Ballot-Léna	DNF	Oil pump

=== World Sportscar Championship results ===
Season	Team	Race car	1	2	3	4	5	6	7	8	9	10	11	12	13	14	15	16	17	18	19	20	21	22
1963	Standard Motor Company	Triumph TR4	DAY	SEB	SEB	TAR	SPA	MAI	NÜR	CON	ROS	LEM	MON	WIS	TAV	FRE	CCE	RTT	OVI	NÜR	MON	MON	TDF	BRI
1963	Standard Motor Company	Triumph TR4			32																			
1964	Autosport International Standard Motor Company	Alpine M63 Triumph Spitfire	DAY	SEB	TAR	MON	SPA	CON	NÜR	ROS	LEM	REI	FRE	CCE	RTT	SIM	NÜR	MON	TDF	BRI	BRI	PAR		
1964	Autosport International Standard Motor Company	Alpine M63 Triumph Spitfire		DNF							DNF													
1965	Harley Cunningham Standard Triumph	Ford Cortina Triumph Spitfire	DAY	SEB	BOL	MON	MON	RTT	TAR	SPA	NÜR	MUG	ROS	LEM	RIE	BOZ	FRE	CCE	OVI	NÜR	BRI	BRI		
1965	Harley Cunningham Standard Triumph	Ford Cortina Triumph Spitfire	DNF	30																				
1966	Standard Triumph	Triumph TR4	DAY	SEB	MON	TAR	SPA	NÜR	LEM	MUG	CCE	HOK	SIM	NÜR	ZEL									
1966	Standard Triumph	Triumph TR4		DNF																				
1968	Leyland Howmet	Triumph TR5 Howmet TX	DAY	SEB	BRH	MON	TAR	NÜR	SPA	WAT	ZEL	LMS												
1968	Leyland Howmet	Triumph TR5 Howmet TX		DNF						12		DNF												
1969	Wilton Jowett	Chevrolet Camaro	DAY	SEB	BRH	MON	TAR	SPA	NÜR	LMS	GLN	ÖST												
1969	Wilton Jowett	Chevrolet Camaro		45																				
1970	Toad Hall Racing Bruce Jennings	Porsche 911	DAY	SEB	BRH	MON	TAR	SPA	NÜR	LMS	GLN	ÖST												
1970	Toad Hall Racing Bruce Jennings	Porsche 911	DNF	DNF							13													
1971	John McComb	Ford Mustang	BUE	DAY	SEB	BRH	MON	SPA	TAR	NÜR	LMS	ÖST	GLN											
1971	John McComb	Ford Mustang		DNF																				
1977	Group 44	Jaguar XJS	DAY	MUG	DIJ	MON	SIL	NÜR	VAL	PER	WAT	EST	LEC	MOS	IMO	SAL	BRH	HOK	VAL					
1977	Group 44	Jaguar XJS									14			3										
1978	Group 44	Jaguar XJS	DAY	SEB	MUG	TAL	DIJ	SIL	NÜR	LEM	MIS	DAY	WAT	VAL	ROD									
1978	Group 44	Jaguar XJS											7											
1979	NART JRT Group 44	Ferrari 512 BB Triumph TR8	DAY	SEB	MUG	TAL	DIJ	RIV	SIL	NÜR	LEM	PER	DAY	WAT	SPA	BRH	ROA	VAL	ELS					
1979	NART JRT Group 44	Ferrari 512 BB Triumph TR8	57											7			6							
1980	Group 44 JRT	Triumph TR8	DAY	BRH	SEB	MUG	MON	RIV	SIL	NÜR	LMS	DAY	WAT	SPA	MOS	VAL	RAM	DIJ						
1980	Group 44 JRT	Triumph TR8	52		6			26							8	7								
1981	Group 44	Triumph TR8	DAY	SEB	MUG	MON	RSD	SIL	NÜR	LMS	PER	DAY	GLN	SPA	MOS	ROA	BRH							
1981	Group 44	Triumph TR8		10																				
1984	Group 44	Jaguar XJR-5	MON	SIL	LMS	NÜR	BRH	MOS	SPA	IMO	FUJ	KYA	SAN											
1984	Group 44	Jaguar XJR-5			DNF																			
1985	Group 44	Jaguar XJR-5	MUG	MON	SIL	LMS	HOC	MOS	SPA	BRH	FUJ	SHA												
1985	Group 44	Jaguar XJR-5				13																		
