= 1980 Italian Championship Group 6 season =

1980 Italian Championship Group 6

Seasons
- ← 1979 1981 →

The 1980 Campionato Italiano di Grouppo 6 season was the fifth season of the Italian Championship Group 6 series.

== Results ==
Races in bold, when also rounds of the World Championship for Makes.

Round	Date	Circuit	Winning driver(s)	Winning car	Report
1	30 March	Varano	(Italy) Giorgio Francia	Osella PA8-BMW	
2	7 April	Magione	(Italy) Giorgio Francia	Osella PA8-BMW	
3	**13 April**	**Mugello**	**(Italy) Riccardo Patrese** **(United States) Eddie Cheever**	**Lancia Beta Montecarlo Turbo**	
4	**27 April**	**Monza**	**(England) Alain de Cadenet** **(South Africa) Desiré Wilson**	**De Cadenet Lola LM1-Cosworth**	report
5	25 May	Enna-Pergusa	(Italy) Renzo Zorzi	Capoferri M1-Ford	
6	1 June	Varano	(Italy) Mauro Nesti	Osella PA7-BMW	
7	15 June	Varano	(Italy) Giorgio Francia	Osella PA8-BMW	
8	29 June	Enna-Pergusa	(Italy) "Amphicar"	Osella PA7-BMW	
9	20 July	Magione	(Italy) Giorgio Francia	Osella PA8-BMW	
10	15 August	Misano	(Italy) Giorgio Francia	Osella PA8-BMW	
11	**7 September**	**Vallelunga**	**(Italy) Giorgio Francia** **(Italy) Roberto Marazzi**	**Osella PA8-BMW**	
12	21 September	Enna-Pergusa	(Italy) Giorgio Francia	Osella PA8-BMW	
13	19 October	Vallelunga	(Italy) Giorgio Francia	Osella PA8-BMW	
14	29 October	Magione	(Italy) Enzo Coloni	Chevron-BMW	
15	2 November	Vallelunga	(Italy) Enzo Coloni	Chevron-BMW	
