= 1980 1000km of Monza =

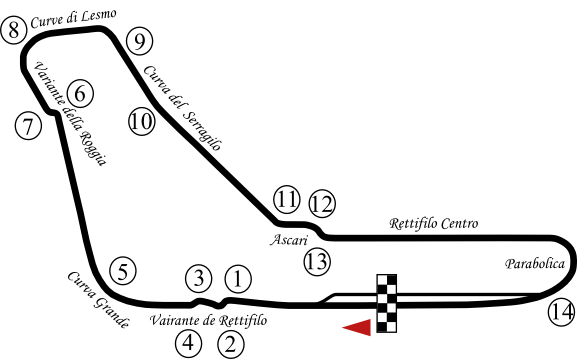
Layout of the Autodromo Nazionale di Monza (1976-1993)

The Monza 1000 Kilometers, was the fourth round of the 1980 World Championship for Makes was held at the Autodromo Nazionale Monza, on 27 April. This race was also the third round of the FIA World Challenge for Endurance Drivers and the fourth round of the Italian Championship Group 6.

== Report ==
=== Entry ===
A total of 53 cars were entered for the event, across seven classes/divisions ranging through Group 2 up to Group 6, with a class for local prototypes. Of these 40 cars practised.

=== Qualifying ===
The pairing of Renzo Zorzi and Claudio Francisci took pole position, in Zorzi’s Capoferri-Ford M1 ahead another Italian Championship runner, the Osella-BMW PA8 of Giorgio Francia and Remo Ramanzini who were nearly one second behind.

=== Race ===
Although the race maintained the traditional title of 1000 km of Monza, the race was actually run over 6 hours, the winner covering 183 laps, approximately 1061 km. Alain de Cadenet and Desiré Wilson took the winner spoils for the de Cadenet team, driving their De Cadenet Lola-Cosworth LM1. The pair won in a time of 6hr 01:08.800mins., averaging a speed of 110.211 mph. This race was only decided three laps from the end; the Porsche 935 of Henri Pescarolo had to pit for a little bit of fuel during the rain, so that Wilson could pass and win the race. Close behind was the little Lancia Montecarlo of Riccardo Patrese and Walter Röhrl.

== Result ==
- Note: Class winners in bold

Pos	Class	No	Team	Drivers	Chassis	Tyres	Laps
Pos	Class	No	Team	Drivers	Engine	Tyres	Laps
1	**S +2.0**	**34**	**(United Kingdom) Alain de Cadenet**	**(United Kingdom) Alain de Cadenet (South Africa) Desiré Wilson**	**De Cadenet LM**	D	**183**
1	**S +2.0**	**34**	**(United Kingdom) Alain de Cadenet**	**(United Kingdom) Alain de Cadenet (South Africa) Desiré Wilson**	**Ford Cosworth DFV 3.0 L V8**	D	**183**
2	**Gr. 5**	**21**	**(West Germany) Sportwagen**	**(West Germany) Jürgen Barth (France) Henri Pescarolo**	**Porsche 935/77A**	D	**183**
2	**Gr. 5**	**21**	**(West Germany) Sportwagen**	**(West Germany) Jürgen Barth (France) Henri Pescarolo**	**Porsche Type-935 2.9 L F6 Turbo**	D	**183**
3	Gr. 5	1	(Italy) Lancia Squadra Corse	(Italy) Riccardo Patrese (West Germany) Walter Röhrl	Lancia Beta Montecarlo Turbo	P	182
3	Gr. 5	1	(Italy) Lancia Squadra Corse	(Italy) Riccardo Patrese (West Germany) Walter Röhrl	Lancia 1.4 L I4 Turbo	P	182
4	Gr. 5	18	(West Germany) Vegla Racing Team	(West Germany) Dieter Schornstein (West Germany) Harald Grohs	Porsche 935/77A	D	180
4	Gr. 5	18	(West Germany) Vegla Racing Team	(West Germany) Dieter Schornstein (West Germany) Harald Grohs	Porsche Type-935 2.9 L F6 Turbo	D	180
5	Gr. 5	2	(Italy) Lancia Squadra Corse	(United States) Eddie Cheever (Italy) Piercarlo Ghinzani	Lancia Beta Montecarlo Turbo	P	176
5	Gr. 5	2	(Italy) Lancia Squadra Corse	(United States) Eddie Cheever (Italy) Piercarlo Ghinzani	Lancia 1.4 L I4 Turbo	P	176
6	**S 1.6**	**65**	**(Italy) Ruggero Parpinelli**	**(Italy) Ruggero Parpinelli (Italy) Silvano Frisori**	**Osella PA6**		**170**
6	**S 1.6**	**65**	**(Italy) Ruggero Parpinelli**	**(Italy) Ruggero Parpinelli (Italy) Silvano Frisori**	**Ford FVA 1.6 L I4**		**170**
7	Gr. 5	19	(Italy) Victor	(Italy) "Victor" (Italy) Giorgio Schön	Porsche 935		170
7	Gr. 5	19	(Italy) Victor	(Italy) "Victor" (Italy) Giorgio Schön	Porsche Type-935 3.2 L F6 Turbo		170
8	S +2.0	33	(France) BMW Zol-Auto	(France) Laurent Ferrier (France) François Servanin	BMW M1	G	167
8	S +2.0	33	(France) BMW Zol-Auto	(France) Laurent Ferrier (France) François Servanin	BMW M88 3.5 L I6	G	167
9	**S 2.0**	**48**	**(Italy) Gimax**	**(Italy) "Gimax" (Italy) Marcello Gallo**	**Osella PA8**		**166**
9	**S 2.0**	**48**	**(Italy) Gimax**	**(Italy) "Gimax" (Italy) Marcello Gallo**	**BMW M12 2.0 L I4**		**166**
10	Gr. 5	15	(West Germany) Erich Schiebler (West Germany) Müllerbrau Team	(West Germany) Anton Fischhaber (West Germany) Walter Ralf (West Germany) Erich Schiebler	Porsche 935		162
10	Gr. 5	15	(West Germany) Erich Schiebler (West Germany) Müllerbrau Team	(West Germany) Anton Fischhaber (West Germany) Walter Ralf (West Germany) Erich Schiebler	Porsche Type-935 2.9 L F6 Turbo		162
11	S 2.0	56	(Italy) Giuseppe Bottura	(Italy) Giuseppe Bottura (Italy) Giuseppe Pellin	March 75S		156
11	S 2.0	56	(Italy) Giuseppe Bottura	(Italy) Giuseppe Bottura (Italy) Giuseppe Pellin	BMW M12 2.0 L I4		156
12	Gr. 5	3	(Italy) Jolly Club	(Italy) Carlo Facetti (Italy) Gianfranco Ricci	Lancia Beta Montecarlo Turbo	P	155
12	Gr. 5	3	(Italy) Jolly Club	(Italy) Carlo Facetti (Italy) Gianfranco Ricci	Lancia 1.4 L I4 Turbo	P	155
13	S +2.0	35	(West Germany) Siegfried Brunn	(West Germany) Siegfried Brunn (Switzerland) Herbert Müller	Porsche 908/3	D	155
13	S +2.0	35	(West Germany) Siegfried Brunn	(West Germany) Siegfried Brunn (Switzerland) Herbert Müller	Porsche 3.0 L F8	D	155
DNF	S 1.6	64	(Italy) Scuderia Vesuvio	(Italy) Roberto Marazzi (Italy) Pasquale Vecchione (Italy) Francesco Pacetta	Osella PA8		169
DNF	S 1.6	64	(Italy) Scuderia Vesuvio	(Italy) Roberto Marazzi (Italy) Pasquale Vecchione (Italy) Francesco Pacetta	Ford FVA 1.6 L I4		169
DNF	S 2.0	42	(Italy) Giorgio Francia (Italy) Scuderia Torino Corse	(Italy) Giorgio Francia (Italy) Remo Ramanzini	Osella PA8		107
DNF	S 2.0	42	(Italy) Giorgio Francia (Italy) Scuderia Torino Corse	(Italy) Giorgio Francia (Italy) Remo Ramanzini	BMW M12 2.0 L I4		107
DNF	S +2.0	31	(Italy) Scuderia Supercar Bellancauto	(Italy) Spartaco Dini (Italy) Fabrizio Violati	Ferrari 512BB	MI	107
DNF	S +2.0	31	(Italy) Scuderia Supercar Bellancauto	(Italy) Spartaco Dini (Italy) Fabrizio Violati	Ferrari 4.9 L F12	MI	107
DNF	GT	26	(Italy) Claudio Magnani	(Italy) Claudio Magnani (Italy) Sergio Rombolotti	Lancia Stratos		105
DNF	GT	26	(Italy) Claudio Magnani	(Italy) Claudio Magnani (Italy) Sergio Rombolotti	Ferrari Dino 2.4 L V6		105
DNF	GT	22	(Italy) Scuderia Dei Fiori	(Italy) Franco Berruto (Italy) Franco Pizzato (Italy) Michele Licheri	Porsche Carrera RSR		103
DNF	GT	22	(Italy) Scuderia Dei Fiori	(Italy) Franco Berruto (Italy) Franco Pizzato (Italy) Michele Licheri	Porsche 3.0 L F6		103
DNF	S 1.6	63	(Italy) Mario Benusiglio	(Italy) Mario Benusiglio (Italy) Luigi de Angelis	Osella PA5		92
DNF	S 1.6	63	(Italy) Mario Benusiglio	(Italy) Mario Benusiglio (Italy) Luigi de Angelis	Ford FVA 1.6 L I4		92
DNF	S 2.0	67	(Italy) Enrico Gagliotto	(Italy) Enrico Gagliotto (Italy) Willi Lovato	Osella PA7		90
DNF	S 2.0	67	(Italy) Enrico Gagliotto	(Italy) Enrico Gagliotto (Italy) Willi Lovato	BMW M10 2.0 L I4		90
DNF	S 2.0	43	(Italy) Scuderia Ateneo	(Italy) Mario Casoni (Italy) "Amphicar" (Italy) Luigi Moreschi	Osella PA7		87
DNF	S 2.0	43	(Italy) Scuderia Ateneo	(Italy) Mario Casoni (Italy) "Amphicar" (Italy) Luigi Moreschi	BMW M10 2.0 L I4		87
DNF	S 1.6	68	(Italy) Ezio Baribbi	(Italy) Ezio Baribbi (Italy) "Pal Joe"	Osella PA7		86
DNF	S 1.6	68	(Italy) Ezio Baribbi	(Italy) Ezio Baribbi (Italy) "Pal Joe"	Ford FVA 1.6 L I4		86
DNF	Gr. 5	6	(Italy) Giuseppe Piazzi	(Italy) Giuseppe Piazzi (Italy) Sandro Cinotti	Fiat X1/9		83
DNF	Gr. 5	6	(Italy) Giuseppe Piazzi	(Italy) Giuseppe Piazzi (Italy) Sandro Cinotti	Fiat 1.6 L I4		83
DNF	S 2.0	51	(Italy) Vito Veninata	(Italy) Vito Veninata (Italy) Giovanni Cascone	Osella PA6		82
DNF	S 2.0	51	(Italy) Vito Veninata	(Italy) Vito Veninata (Italy) Giovanni Cascone	BMW M12 2.0 L I4		82
DNF	Gr. 5	11	(Italy) William Sala	(Italy) Carlo Pietromarchi (Italy) Marco Micangeli (Italy) Carlo Faraci	De Tomaso Pantera	P	77
DNF	Gr. 5	11	(Italy) William Sala	(Italy) Carlo Pietromarchi (Italy) Marco Micangeli (Italy) Carlo Faraci	Ford 5.8 L V8	P	77
DNF	Gr. 5	5	(West Germany) Team Immobilien Reiss	(West Germany) Gerd Reiss (West Germany) Albrecht Krebs	BMW 320i	D	63
DNF	Gr. 5	5	(West Germany) Team Immobilien Reiss	(West Germany) Gerd Reiss (West Germany) Albrecht Krebs	BMW M12 1.4 L I4 Turbo	D	63
DNF	T	7	(Italy) Angelo Chiapparini	(Italy) Ademaro Massa (Italy) Giancarlo Galimberti (Italy) Angelo Chiapparini	Alfa Romeo Alfetta GTV		59
DNF	T	7	(Italy) Angelo Chiapparini	(Italy) Ademaro Massa (Italy) Giancarlo Galimberti (Italy) Angelo Chiapparini	Alfa Romeo 2.0 L I4		59
DNF	S 1.6	69	(Italy) Pier Giorgio Provolo	(Italy) Pier Giorgio Provolo (Italy) Francesco Cerulli-Irelli	AMS		46
DNF	S 1.6	69	(Italy) Pier Giorgio Provolo	(Italy) Pier Giorgio Provolo (Italy) Francesco Cerulli-Irelli	Ford FVA 1.6 L I4		46
DNF	S 2.0	53	(Italy) Dino Ridolfi	(Italy) Pasquale Barberio (Italy) Dino Ridolfi	Lola T298		45
DNF	S 2.0	53	(Italy) Dino Ridolfi	(Italy) Pasquale Barberio (Italy) Dino Ridolfi	BMW M12 2.0 L I4		45
DNF	S 2.0	46	(Italy) Arcadio Pezzali	(Italy) Mauro Nesti (Italy) Arcadio Pezzali	Osella PA8		36
DNF	S 2.0	46	(Italy) Arcadio Pezzali	(Italy) Mauro Nesti (Italy) Arcadio Pezzali	BMW M12 2.0 L I4		36
DNF	S 2.0	54	(Switzerland) Georges Morand	(France) Jacques Boillat (Switzerland) Georges Morand	Lola T296		33
DNF	S 2.0	54	(Switzerland) Georges Morand	(France) Jacques Boillat (Switzerland) Georges Morand	Ford Cosworth BDG 2.0 L I4		33
DNF	S +2.0	32	(Italy) Renzo Zorzi	(Italy) Renzo Zorzi (Italy) Claudio Francisci	Capoferri M1		26
DNF	S +2.0	32	(Italy) Renzo Zorzi	(Italy) Renzo Zorzi (Italy) Claudio Francisci	Ford Cosworth DFV 3.0 L V8		26
DNF	S 2.0	44	(Italy) Pasquale Anastasio	(Italy) Pasquale Anastasio (Italy) Giampaolo Ceraolo	Osella PA8		26
DNF	S 2.0	44	(Italy) Pasquale Anastasio	(Italy) Pasquale Anastasio (Italy) Giampaolo Ceraolo	BMW M12 2.0 L I4		26
DNF	S 2.0	52	(Italy) Duilio Ghislotti	(Italy) Duilio Ghislotti (Italy) Luigi Colzani	Lola T296		22
DNF	S 2.0	52	(Italy) Duilio Ghislotti	(Italy) Duilio Ghislotti (Italy) Luigi Colzani	BMW M12 2.0 L I4		22
DNF	S 2.0	41	(Italy) Scuderia Torino Corse (Italy) Osella Squadra Corse	(Italy) Vittorio Brambilla (Italy) Lella Lombardi	Osella PA8	P	16
DNF	S 2.0	41	(Italy) Scuderia Torino Corse (Italy) Osella Squadra Corse	(Italy) Vittorio Brambilla (Italy) Lella Lombardi	BMW M12 2.0 L I4	P	16
DNF	S 1.6	66	(Italy) Gerardo Vatielli	(Italy) Gerardo Vatielli (Italy) Paolo Giangrossi	Osella PA6		11
DNF	S 1.6	66	(Italy) Gerardo Vatielli	(Italy) Gerardo Vatielli (Italy) Paolo Giangrossi	Ford FVA 1.6 L I4		11
DNF	Gr. 5	14	(Italy) Autosebio Racing	(Italy) Felice Besenzoni (Italy) Luciano Dal Ban	Ferrari 308 GTB		6
DNF	Gr. 5	14	(Italy) Autosebio Racing	(Italy) Felice Besenzoni (Italy) Luciano Dal Ban	Ferrari 3.0 L V8		6
DNS	S 1.6	62	(Italy) Salvatore Pellegrino	(Italy) Salvatore Pellegrino (Italy) Vito Carone (Italy) Duilio Truffo	Osella PA6		-
DNS	S 1.6	62	(Italy) Salvatore Pellegrino	(Italy) Salvatore Pellegrino (Italy) Vito Carone (Italy) Duilio Truffo	Ford FVA 1.6 L I4		-
DNS	S 1.6	62	(Italy) Giam Piero Gatti	(Italy) Giam Piero Gatti (Italy) Angelo Bottazzini	Chevron B36		-
DNS	S 1.6	62	(Italy) Giam Piero Gatti	(Italy) Giam Piero Gatti (Italy) Angelo Bottazzini	Ford FVA 1.6 L I4		-
DNS	Gr. 5	12	(Italy) Jolly Club	(Italy) Carlo Facetti (Italy) Giancarlo Gagliardi	Ferrari 308 GTB Turbo	P	-
DNS	Gr. 5	12	(Italy) Jolly Club	(Italy) Carlo Facetti (Italy) Giancarlo Gagliardi	Ferrari 2.9 L V8 Turbo	P	-

Fastest lap: Renzo Zorzi/Claudio Francisci, 1:48.6s (119.468 mph)
