= Vera Stolyarova =

Russian ballroom dancer (born 1993)

- Born: Vera Vladimirovna Bondareva; October 12, 1993 (age 32); Novosibirsk, Novosibirsk Oblast, Russia
- Occupations: Athlete, dancer, blogger
- Years active: 1998–present
- Parent: Alexey Stolyarov
- Awards: Master of Sports of Russia (2018)
- Website: www.verabond.ru

Vera Vladimirovna Stolyarova (Bondareva) (Russian: Вера Владимировна Столярова (Бондарева); born 12 October 1993) is a Russian ballroom dancer (Latin American program). Winner of the World Junior Championship (2007). Master of Sports of Russia of international class (2018). Vice-World and European champion in 2021. Since 2022, he has been developing as a media personality, mentor of dance projects and entrepreneur, she is the founder of the EAZYBEAUTY beauty studio in Moscow.

== Biography ==
Stolyarova was born on 12 October 1993 in Novosibirsk. She started her dancing career in early childhood. She graduated from high school at the age of 15, completing the last four classes with an external degree in less than two years and passing the Unified State Exam ahead of schedule. After school, she moved to Italy, where she graduated from the University of Ca' Foscari at the Faculty of Linguistics with a degree in International Politics.

In 2005, she formed a dance duo with Viktor Burchuladze, with whom she achieved her first major international successes, including winning the World Junior II Championship in 2007. From 2008 to 2015, she lived and trained in Italy, winning the Italian National Championship in the Youth and Adult categories.

In 2013, she participated in the Italian version of the show Dancing with the Stars, Ballando con le Stelle, paired with actor Federico Costantini. She achieved the greatest success in her professional career with Andrey Gusev (2015-2022). In 2021, the pair became silver medalists at the WDSF European and World Championships.

Also, on 25 June 2021, she became the champion of Russia in the category of sequels (show numbers). During her career, she became the vice-champion of Russia in the adult category seven times. In 2022, she announced the end of her professional sports career, after which she took up teaching, teaching adults and children.

== TV ==
After retiring from big-time sports, she became a participant in the projects of the TNT TV channel. In 2024, she took part in the Titans show, where she defeated the world boxing champion in an individual challenge in the first edition. In the same year, she became a mentor for the Stardance project. In 2026, she became a member of the "Titans project. The Battle of the Seasons".

== Personal life ==
In March 2025, at the VTB Arena stadium, I received a marriage proposal from blogger and athlete Alexey Stolyarov. On December 17, 2025, the couple officially registered their marriage at the Griboyedov Registry Office in Moscow.

After the marriage was registered, she took her husband's last name. In January 2026, the couple publicly announced that they were expecting their first child.

== Sporting achievements ==
Year	Tournament	Program	Place
2012	European Championship	Latin American	17
2012	World championship	Latin American	9
2013	European Championship	Latin American	11
2014	European Championship	Latin American	12
2014	World championship	Latin American	20
2017	World championship	Latin American	6
2018	World championship	Latin American	4
2019	World championship	Latin American	4
2021	European Championship	Latin American	2
2021	World championship	Latin American	2
