= Autodromo di Pergusa =

Motorsport venue in Italy

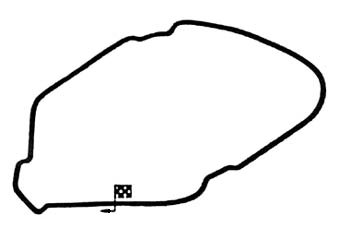
- Grand Prix Circuit (1975–1994)
- Location: Pergusa, Sicily
- Coordinates: 37°30′52″N 14°18′23″E
- Capacity: 35,500
- FIA Grade: 3
- Opened: 1951
- Major events: Former: Mediterranean Grand Prix (1962–1965, 1967–1970, 1972–1998); Coppa Florio (1974–1979, 1981, 2020); Coppa Cittá di Enna (1950–1955, 1958–1959, 1961–1970, 1972–1981, 1999); TCR Italy (1987–1999, 2015, 2024); World SBK (1989); FIA GT (2002–2003); ETCC (1977, 1979–1984, 2000, 2002–2003)
- Website: https://www.autodromopergusa.it

Grand Prix Circuit with Schumacher chicane (1995–present)
- Length: 4.950 km (3.076 mi)
- Turns: 16
- Race lap record: 1:31.149 ( (Brazil) Ricardo Rosset, Reynard 95D, 1995, F3000)

Grand Prix Circuit (1975–1994)
- Length: 4.950 km (3.076 mi)
- Turns: 16
- Race lap record: 1:25.157 ( (Italy) Christian Pescatori, Reynard 93D, 1994, F3000)

Grand Prix Circuit (1971–1975)
- Length: 4.846 km (3.011 mi)
- Turns: 12
- Race lap record: 1:22.400 ( (France) Patrick Depailler, Alpine A367, 1973, F2)

Grand Prix Circuit (1970)
- Length: 4.844 km (3.010 mi)
- Turns: 8
- Race lap record: 1:23.500 ( (Switzerland) Clay Regazzoni, Tecno TF70, 1970, F2)

Original Circuit (1951–1969)
- Length: 4.800 km (2.983 mi)
- Turns: 5
- Race lap record: 1:12.800 ( (Austria) Jochen Rindt, Brabham BT23C, 1968, F2)

The Autodromo di Pergusa is an automobile and motorcycle circuit that encircles the only Sicilian natural lake, Pergusa Lake. The circuit is also known as Enna-Pergusa, as the lake is located near the city of Enna.

== Overview ==
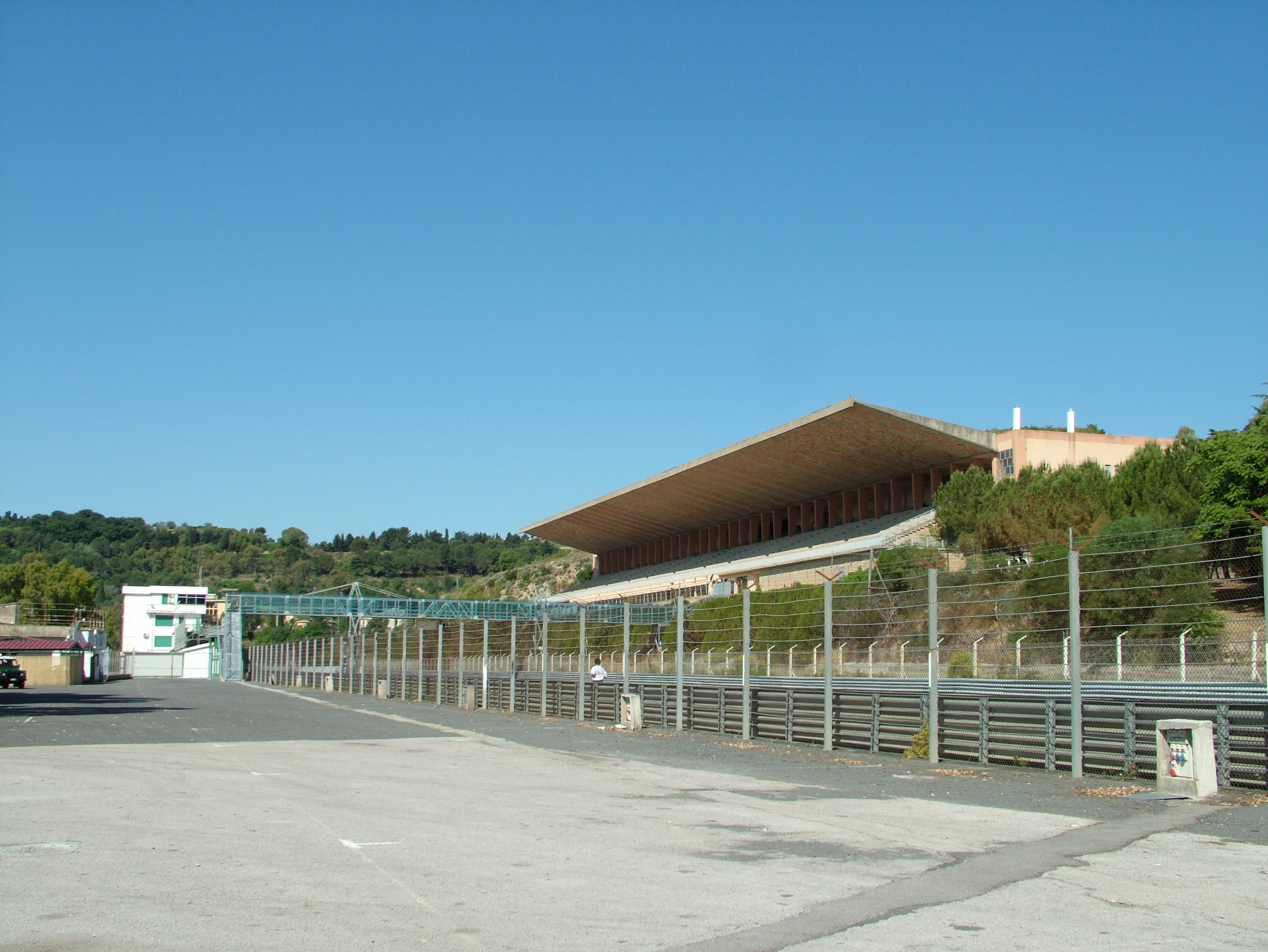
Autodrome of Pergusa

During the 1960s, the track hosted various sportscar events such as the Coppa Città di Enna and later in the 1970s the Coppa Florio. It also played host to a non-championship Formula One event known as the Mediterranean Grand Prix. In 1989 the Italian round of the World Superbike Championship was held here. In the 1990s, the track was upgraded and hosted events for the FIA Sportscar Championship, FIA GT Championship, and Formula 3000. In 1997, the track was also the location of the Ferrari Festival.

The last round of the 2012 Superstars Series and 2012 International GTSprint Series was held at Pergusa. The circuit hosted a round of the European Touring Car Cup in 2013, 2014 and 2015. The venue hosted a round of the 2015 TCR Italian Series.

The dust and the abrasive nature of the track tended to make the surface very slippery. The Formula 3000 races in particular were also known for very poor standards of organization and marshalling.

Starting in 1974, the Coppa Florio, one of the world's oldest motor races, was revived as a sports car race at Pergusa. The race counted towards the World Sportscar Championship most years from 1975, last being held in 1981. In 2020, Creventic hosted a 12 hour race around the circuit in a two day event on October 10–11 as part of the 2020 24H GT Series, again reviving the Coppa Florio name.

== Events ==
Former

- 24H Series
  - Coppa Florio (2020)
- Euro Formula 3000 (1999–2003)
- European Formula Two Championship
  - Mediterranean Grand Prix (1967–1970, 1972–1984)
- European Sportscar Championship
  - Coppa Cittá di Enna (1970, 1972–1974)
  - Coppa Florio (1978)
- European Touring Car Championship (1977, 1979–1984, 2000, 2002–2003)
- European Touring Car Cup (2013–2015)
- Ferrari Festival (1997)
- FIA European Formula 3 Championship (1976–1979, 1982, 1984)
- FIA GT Championship (2002–2003)
- International Formula 3000
  - Mediterranean Grand Prix (1985–1998)
- International GTSprint Series (2012)
- Interserie (1994–1995)
- Italian Formula Renault Championship (2000–2002)
- Italian Formula Three Championship (1980–2000, 2002–2004)
- Italian GT Championship (1993, 2003–2004, 2021–2023)
- SportsRacing World Cup
  - Pergusa 2 Hours 30 Minutes (1999)
- Superbike World Championship (1989)
- Superstars Series (2012)
- TCR Italy Championship (1987–1999, 2015, 2024)
- World Sportscar Championship
  - Coppa Cittá di Enna (1962–1967)
  - Coppa Florio (1975–1977, 1979, 1981)

== Lap records ==
As of June 2024, the fastest official race lap records at the Autodromo di Pergusa (Enna-Pergusa) are listed as:

Category	Time	Driver	Vehicle	Event
Grand Prix Circuit with Schumacher Chicane (1995–present): 4.950 km (3.076 mi)
Formula 3000	1:31.149	Ricardo Rosset	Reynard 95D	1995 Mediterranean Grand Prix
WSC	1:31.728	Nicola Larini	Ferrari 333 SP	1999 Pergusa 2 hours and 30 Minutes
GT3	1:33.809	Antonio Fuoco	Ferrari 488 GT3 Evo 2020	2021 Pergusa Italian GT round
GT1 (GTS)	1:36.594	Fabrizio Gollin	Chrysler Viper GTS-R	2002 FIA GT Pergusa 500km
Formula Three	1:38.301	Stefano Gattuso	Dallara F304	2004 Pergusa Italian F3 round
TCR Touring Car	1:39.562	Park Jun-ui	Hyundai Elantra N TCR (2024)	2024 Pergusa TCR Italy round
N-GT	1:40.755	Marc Lieb	Porsche 911 (996) GT3-RS	2003 FIA GT Pergusa 500km
Formula Renault 2.0	1:42.856	Robert Kubica	Tatuus FR2000	2002 Pergusa Formula Renault 2000 Italia round
Super Touring	1:43.254	Fabrizio Giovanardi	Alfa Romeo 155 TS	1997 Pergusa Italian Superturismo round
GT2	1:43.330	Andrea Palma	Ferrari 458 Italia GT2	2012 Pergusa International GTSprint Series round
GT4	1:44.298	Max Braams	McLaren 570S GT4	2020 Coppa Florio
Superstars Series	1:44.974	Raffaele Giammaria	Mercedes C63 AMG	2012 Pergusa Superstars Series round
Super 2000	1:46.815	Roberto Colciago	Alfa Romeo 156 GTA	2003 Pergusa ETCC round
Super 1600	2:06.271	Lorenzo Veglia	Ford Fiesta 1.6 16V	2013 Pergusa ETC round
Grand Prix Circuit (1975–1994): 4.950 km (3.076 mi)
Formula 3000	1:25.157	Christian Pescatori	Reynard 93D	1994 Mediterranean Grand Prix
Interserie	1:27.840	Frederico Careca	HSB-Penske PC18 Buick Turbo Can-Am	1994 Pergusa Interserie round
Formula Two	1:30.090	Mike Thackwell	Ralt RH6/84	1984 Mediterranean Grand Prix
Group 6	1:36.100	Renzo Zorzi	Capoferri M1	1980 3 Ore di Pergusa
Formula Three	1:37.040	Walter Voulaz	Dallara F389	1989 Pergusa Italian F3 round
Sports 2000	1:37.790	Gabriele Ciuti	Osella PA7	1981 Coppa Città di Enna
Group C	1:38.457	Emilio de Villota	Lola T600	1981 Coppa Floria (Enna 6 Hours)
Group A	1:40.148	Alessandro Nannini	Alfa Romeo 155 GTA	1992 Pergusa Italian Superturismo round
Super Touring	1:42.819	Fabrizio Giovanardi	Peugeot 405 Mi16	1994 Pergusa Italian Superturismo round
World SBK	1:43.143	Raymond Roche	Ducati 851	1989 Pergusa World SBK round
Group 5	1:44.100	Riccardo Patrese	Lancia Beta Montecarlo	1979 Coppa Floria (6 h Pergusa)
Group 2	1:51.200	Carlo Facetti	BMW 3.0 CSL	1977 500km Di Pergusa
Grand Prix Circuit (1971–1975): 4.846 km (3.011 mi)
Formula Two	1:22.400	Patrick Depailler	Alpine A367	1973 Mediterranean Grand Prix
Group 5	1:24.100	Arturo Merzario	Alfa Romeo T/33/TT/12	1975 Coppa Florio
Sports 2000	1:24.900	Gérard Larrousse	Alpine A441	1974 Coppa Città di Enna
Group 4	1:34.800	Clemens Schickentanz (Note: Both drivers take the same lap time independently.); Paul Keller	Porsche 911 Carrera RSR	1974 Coppa Florio
Grand Prix Circuit (1970): 4.844 km (3.010 mi)
Formula Two	1:23.500	Clay Regazzoni	Tecno TF70	1970 Mediterranean Grand Prix
Group 6 (Sports 2000)	1:26.600	Jo Bonnier	Lola T210	1970 Coppa Città di Enna
Original Grand Prix Circuit (1951–1969): 4.800 km (2.983 mi)
Formula Two	1:12.800	Jochen Rindt	Brabham BT23C	1968 Mediterranean Grand Prix
Formula One	1:15.800	Jim Clark	Lotus 25	1965 Mediterranean Grand Prix
Group 4	1:17.400	Mario Casoni	Ford GT40	1966 Coppa Città di Enna
Group 6	1:18.400	Nino Vaccarella	Alfa Romeo T33/3 Coupé	1969 Coppa Città di Enna
Group 3	1:20.200	Bob Bondurant	Shelby Cobra Daytona Coupe	1965 Coppa Città di Enna
