= 1980 World Sportscar Championship =

Racing tournament

Seasons
- ← 1979 1981 →

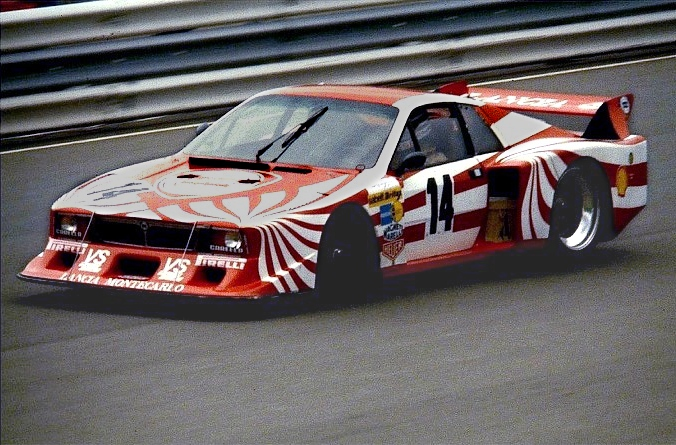
Lancia won the 1980 World Championship for Makes as well as the Division 2 title with its Montecarlo

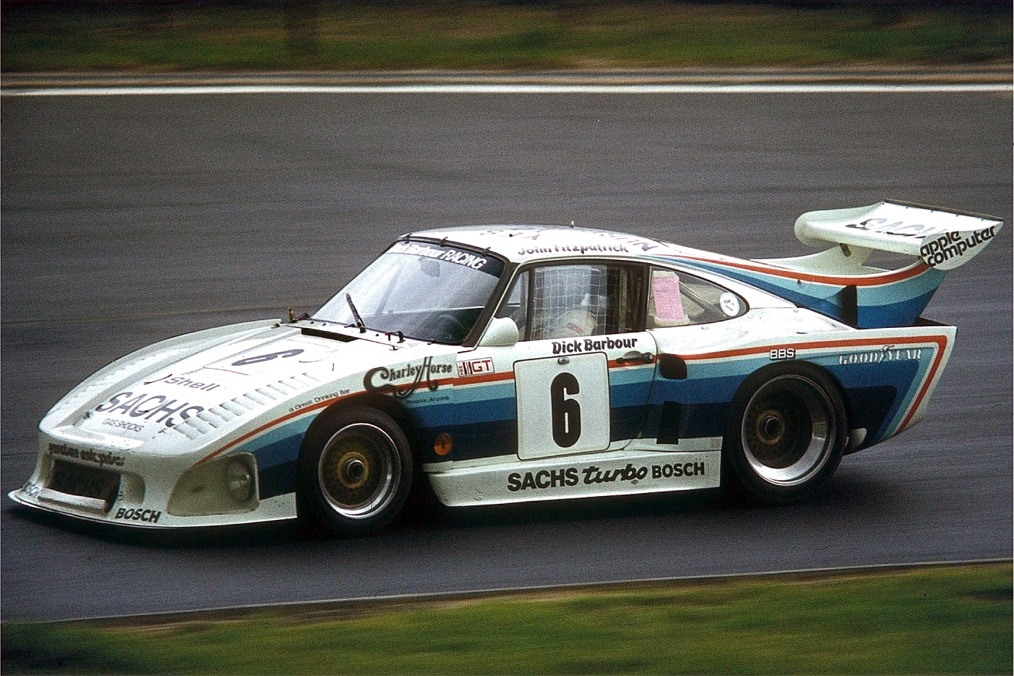
Porsche won Division 1 of the 1980 World Championship for Makes with the 935

The 1980 World Sportscar Championship season was the 28th season of FIA World Sportscar Championship motor racing. It featured the 1980 World Championship for Makes which was contested as a series running under both Fédération Internationale de l'Automobile (FIA) and International Motor Sports Association (IMSA) regulations. It ran from 2 February 1980 to 28 September 1980, and comprised 11 races, including races run with Camel GT Championship.

A World Challenge for Endurance Drivers was also held over an eleven-round series, six of which were run concurrently with rounds of the World Championship for Makes. The Challenge was not awarded World Championship status, but would be promoted the following season and join the Championship for Makes.

The 16 combined events made for one of the most gruelling and varied championships in the history of motor racing. Some events, notably Le Mans and Daytona featured prototype sports cars. Others like the second shorter Daytona race and the Spa 24 Hour were touring car events with the rest consisting mostly of Grand Touring sportscars. Some of the European races featured Sports 2000 open bodied sports cars, but nothing larger than two litres engine capacity. No single driver started more than ten of the 16 races, with the Monza 1000 and the Riverside 5 Hour both occurring on the same day (and strangely both events counting towards the drivers title) no driver could attempt all 16. With over 1100 drivers competing it was one of the largest entries in the history of the sport.

The World Championship of Makes was contested in two classes, under and over 2000 cc of engine capacity. At the end of the championship Lancia and Porsche had won the two classes respectively with the same pointscore. The tie was broken in favour of Lancia, a fitting reward for the Italian manufacturer who had fielded a factory team of two or three Lancia Montecarlos across the European races featuring Formula One drivers and World Rally Champions like Riccardo Patrese, Eddie Cheever, Michele Alboreto, Piercarlo Ghinzani, Walter Röhrl and Markku Alén, as well as providing support to the Jolly Club team's Montecarlo who made trips to North America when the factory team did not.

In the World Endurance Challenge, only three drivers competed in ten races over the season and two of them were rewarded with first and second in the Challenge. American John Paul, Sr. won the series despite collecting only one win, the final race; the Road America 500 co-driving with his son, John Paul Jr. in their Porsche 935. Paul raced a variety of Porsches, 935s and a 930 as well as a Mazda RX-3 at the 6 Hours of Daytona touring car race. British driver John Fitzpatrick was just five points behind Paul at seasons finish despite taking three race wins at Sebring, Riverside and Mosport. He had used Porsche 935s and an AMC Spirit in his championship chase. Porsche 935 and Mazda RX-3 racer Dick Barbour finished third, four points behind Fitzpatrick.

Two drivers lost their lives during the season. Martin Raymond was killed in a Chevron B36 at Brands Hatch and Manuel Quintana died in a qualifying accident at Sebring in his Porsche 911.

== Schedule ==
The following 16 races made up the 1980 World Championship for Makes and World Challenge for Endurance Drivers.

Makes Rnd	Drivers Rnd	Race	Circuit	Date
1	1	(United States) 24 Hour Pepsi Challenge	Daytona International Speedway	2 February; 3 February
2		(United Kingdom) Brands Hatch 6 Hours	Brands Hatch	16 March
	2	(United States) 12 Hours of Sebring	Sebring International Raceway	22 March
3		(Italy) Mugello 6 Hours	Mugello Circuit	13 April
4	3	(Italy) 1000 km Monza	Autodromo Nazionale Monza	27 April
	4	(United States) Riverside 5 Hours	Riverside International Raceway	27 April
5	5	(United Kingdom) Silverstone 6 Hours	Silverstone Circuit	11 May
6	6	(West Germany) 1000 km Nürburgring	Nürburgring	25 May
7	7	(France) 24 Hours of Le Mans	Circuit de la Sarthe	14 June; 15 June
	8	(United States) 6 Hours of Daytona	Daytona International Speedway	29 June
8		(United States) 6 Hours of Watkins Glen	Watkins Glen International	6 July
	9	(Belgium) Spa 24 Hours	Circuit de Spa-Francorchamps	26 July; 27 July
9	10	(Canada) Molson Canadian 1000 (6 Hours)	Mosport Park	17 August
10		(Italy) 6 Hours of Vallelunga	Vallelunga Circuit	7 September
	11	(United States) Road America 500	Road America	31 August
11		(France) 1000 km Dijon	Dijon-Prenois	28 September

== Season results ==
Although a multitude of classes contended for the Championship for Makes, only the overall race winners are listed here.

Rnd	Circuit	Overall Winning Team	Results
Rnd	Circuit	Overall Winning Drivers	Results
1	Daytona	(West Germany) #2 LM Joest Racing	Results
1	Daytona	(West Germany) Reinhold Joest (West Germany) Rolf Stommelen (West Germany) Volkert Merl	Results
2	Brands Hatch	(Italy) #19 Lancia Corse	Results
2	Brands Hatch	(Italy) Riccardo Patrese (West Germany) Walter Röhrl	Results
3	Mugello	(Italy) #33 Lancia Corse	Results
3	Mugello	(Italy) Riccardo Patrese (United States) Eddie Cheever	Results
4	Monza	(United Kingdom) #34 Alain de Cadenet	Results
4	Monza	(United Kingdom) Alain de Cadenet (South Africa) Desiré Wilson	Results
5	Silverstone	(United Kingdom) #8 Alain de Cadenet	Results
5	Silverstone	(United Kingdom) Alain de Cadenet (South Africa) Desiré Wilson	Results
6	Nürburgring	(West Germany) #31 Liqui Moly Joest Racing	Results
6	Nürburgring	(West Germany) Rolf Stommelen (West Germany) Jürgen Barth	Results
7	La Sarthe	(France) #16 Jean Rondeau	Results
7	La Sarthe	(France) Jean Rondeau (France) Jean-Pierre Jaussaud	Results
8	Watkins Glen	(Italy) #31 Lancia Corse	Results
8	Watkins Glen	(Italy) Riccardo Patrese (West Germany) Hans Heyer	Results
9	Mosport	(United States) #6 Dick Barbour Racing	Results
9	Mosport	(United Kingdom) John Fitzpatrick (United Kingdom) Brian Redman	Results
10	Vallelunga	(Italy) #42 Giorgio Francia	Results
10	Vallelunga	(Italy) Giorgio Francia (Italy) Roberto Marazzi	Results
11	Dijon	(Germany) #1 Sportwagen Team	Results
11	Dijon	(West Germany) Jürgen Barth (France) Henri Pescarolo	Results

Although a multitude of classes contended for the World Challenge for Endurance Drivers, only the overall race winners are listed here.

Rnd	Circuit	Overall Winning Team	Results
Rnd	Circuit	Overall Winning Drivers	Results
1	Daytona	(West Germany) #2 LM Joest Racing	Results
1	Daytona	(West Germany) Reinhold Joest (West Germany) Rolf Stommelen (West Germany) Volkert Merl	Results
2	Sebring	(United States) #6 Dick Barbour Racing	Results
2	Sebring	(United Kingdom) John Fitzpatrick (United States) Dick Barbour	Results
3	Monza	(United Kingdom) #34 Alain de Cadenet	Results
3	Monza	(United Kingdom) Alain de Cadenet (South Africa) Desiré Wilson	Results
4	Riverside	(United States) #6 Dick Barbour Racing	Results
4	Riverside	(United Kingdom) John Fitzpatrick (United States) Dick Barbour	Results
5	Silverstone	(United Kingdom) #8 Alain de Cadenet	Results
5	Silverstone	(United Kingdom) Alain de Cadenet (South Africa) Desiré Wilson	Results
6	Nürburgring	(West Germany) #31 Liqui Moly Joest Racing	Results
6	Nürburgring	(West Germany) Rolf Stommelen (West Germany) Jürgen Barth	Results
7	La Sarthe	(France) #16 Jean Rondeau	Results
7	La Sarthe	(France) Jean Rondeau (France) Jean-Pierre Jaussaud	Results
8	Daytona	(United States) #78 Performance Innovations	Results
8	Daytona	(United States) Rob McFarlin (United States) Hurley Haywood	Results
9	Spa-Francorchamps	(Belgium) #3 Belga Castrol Team	Results
9	Spa-Francorchamps	(Belgium) Jean-Michel Martin (Belgium) Philippe Martin	Results
10	Mosport	(United States) #6 Dick Barbour Racing	Results
10	Mosport	(United Kingdom) John Fitzpatrick (United Kingdom) Brian Redman	Results
11	Road America	(United States) #18 JLP Racing	Results
11	Road America	(United States) John Paul Jr. (United States) John Paul, Sr.	Results

== World Championship for Makes - Results ==
The World Championship for Makes was only open to select categories of cars. This included the FIA's Group 5 Special Production Cars, Group 4 Grand Touring Cars, Group 3 Series Production Grand Touring Cars, Group 2 Touring Cars, and Group 1 Series Production Touring Cars. An overall championship was awarded as well as two class titles: Division 1, for cars over 2000 cc and Division 2 for those under 2000 cc.

Points were awarded to the top ten finishers in each division in the order of 20-15-12-10-8-6-4-3-2-1, with only the best eight results out of the eleven races being counted. Only the best placed entry of each make in each division was eligible to score points, with no points awarded to other placings.

=== Overall Championship ===
The overall championship was to be awarded to the make achieving the highest net point score in either Division. The resultant tie between Porsche and Lancia was decided in Lancia's favour due to the greater number of Division victories scored by the Italian make.

=== Division 1 : Over 2000 cc ===
Pos	Manufacturer	Rd 1	Rd 2	Rd 3	Rd 4	Rd 5	Rd 6	Rd 7	Rd 8	Rd 9	Rd 10	Rd 11	Total
1	(Germany) Porsche	20	20	(15)	20	20	20	20	20	20	(15)	(20)	160
2	(Italy) Lancia			20							20		40
3	(Italy) Ferrari					12							12
4	(Germany) BMW								4				4
5	(Germany) Opel						3						3

=== Division 2 : Under 2000 cc ===
Pos	Manufacturer	Rd 1	Rd 2	Rd 3	Rd 4	Rd 5	Rd 6	Rd 7	Rd 8	Rd 9	Rd 10	Rd 11	Total
1	(Italy) Lancia	20	20	20	20	20	20	20	20	(20)	(20)		160
2	(Germany) BMW					15	12				12	20	59
3=	(Germany) Porsche										15		15
3=	(Italy) Fiat											15	15
5	(United States) Ford						4						4
6	(Germany) Opel						1						1

== World Championship for Makes - The cars ==
The following models contributed to the net points scored by makes in the 1980 championship.

=== Division 1 ===
- Porsche 935
- Lancia Montecarlo
- Ferrari 512BB
- BMW M1
- Opel Monza

=== Division 2 ===
- Lancia Montecarlo
- BMW 320i
- Porsche 935
- Fiat X1/9
- Ford Escort RS 2000
- Opel Kadett

== World Challenge for Endurance Drivers - Results ==
The World Challenge for Endurance Drivers was won by John Paul Sr. from John Fitzpatrick and Brian Redman.
