= Coppa Cittá di Enna =

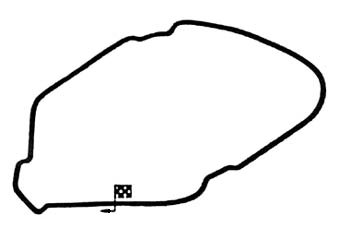
- Venue: Autodromo di Pergusa
- First race: 1950
- Last race: 1999
- Previous names: Gran Premio di Pergusa; Copa Cittá de Enna; Copa Florio

The Coppa Cittá di Enna was a sports car race held at the Autodromo di Pergusa near Enna, Italy. The race began in 1950 as a non-championship event, before joining the World Sportscar Championship in 1962. Between 1968 and 1981, the race bounced between the WSC, the European Sportscar Championship, and non-championship status. The race was revived as part of the Sports Racing World Cup in 1999.

== Results ==
Year	Overall winner(s)	Entrant	Car	Distance/Duration	Race title	Championship	Report
1950	(Italy) Gino Valenzano		Abarth 1100	264 km (164 mi)	Gran Premio di Pergusa	Non-championship	report
1951	(Italy) Franco Cortese		Frazer-Nash	425 km (264 mi)	Gran Premio di Pergusa	Non-championship	report
1952	(Italy) Luigi Bordonaro		Ferrari 212 Export	264 km (164 mi)	Gran Premio di Pergusa	Non-championship	report
1953	(Italy) Franco Bordoni		Gordini T15S 2.3	264 km (164 mi)	Gran Premio di Pergusa	Non-championship	report
1954	(Italy) Franco Bordoni	(Italy) Franco Bordoni	Gordini T24S 3.0	264 km (164 mi)	Gran Premio di Pergusa	Non-championship	report
1955	(Italy) Franco Bordoni		Maserati A6GCS	264 km (164 mi)	Gran Premio di Pergusa	Non-championship	report
1956–1957: Not held
1958	(Italy) Giulio Cabianca		Osca S1500	1 hour	Gran Premio di Pergusa	Non-championship	report
1959	(Italy) Nino Vaccarella		Maserati 200SI	1 hour	Gran Premio di Pergusa	Non-championship	report
1960: Not held
1961	(Italy) Mennato Boffa		Maserati Tipo 60	1 hour	Gran Premio di Pergusa	Non-championship	report
1962	(Italy) "Pam" (Italy) Giancarlo Scotti	(Italy) Abarth	Fiat-Abarth 1000	312 km (194 mi)	Coppa Cittá di Enna	World Sportscar Championship	report
1963	(Italy) "Tiger"		Fiat-Abarth 1000	312 km (194 mi)	Coppa Cittá di Enna	World Sportscar Championship	report
1964	(Germany) Hans Herrmann	(Italy) Abarth	Abarth-Simca 2000 GT	312 km (194 mi)	Coppa Cittá di Enna	World Sportscar Championship	report
1965	(Italy) Mario Casoni	(Italy) Abarth	Ferrari 250 LM	500 km (310 mi)	Coppa Cittá di Enna	World Sportscar Championship	report
1966	(Italy) "Pam"	(Italy) Scuderia Brescia	Dino 206 S	336 km (209 mi)	Coppa Cittá di Enna	World Sportscar Championship	report
1967	(Italy) Nino Vaccarella	(Italy) Scuderia Brescia Corse	Ford GT40	300 km (190 mi)	Coppa Cittá di Enna	World Sportscar Championship	report
1968	(Switzerland) Jo Siffert		Porsche 910	240 km (150 mi)	Coppa Cittá di Enna	Non-championship	report
1969	(Italy) Nino Vaccarella	(Italy) Autodelta	Alfa Romeo T33/3 Coupé	240 km (150 mi)	Coppa Cittá di Enna	Non-championship	report
1970	(Sweden) Jo Bonnier	(Sweden) Jo Bonnier	Lola T210-Ford	240 km (150 mi)	Coppa Cittá di Enna	European 2-Litre Championship	report
1971: Not held
1972	(Italy) Arturo Merzario	(Italy) Scuderia Brescia Corse	Abarth Osella SE-021	368 km (229 mi)	Coppa Cittá di Enna	European 2-Litre Championship	report
1973	(Italy) Vittorio Brambilla	(Italy) Abarth Corse	Abarth-Osella PA1	368 km (229 mi)	Coppa Cittá di Enna	European 2-Litre Championship	report
1974	(France) Gérard Larrousse	Switzerland Archambeaud	Alpine A441-Renault	290 km (180 mi)	Coppa Cittá di Enna	European 2-Litre Championship	report
1975	(Italy) Arturo Merzario (Germany) Jochen Mass	(Germany) Willi Kauhsen Racing Team	Alfa Romeo T33/TT/12	1,000 km (620 mi)	Coppa Florio	World Sportscar Championship	report
1976	(Germany) Jochen Mass (Germany) Rolf Stommelen	(Germany) Martini Racing	Porsche 936	500 km (310 mi)	Coppa Florio	World Sportscar Championship (Group 6)	report
1977	(Italy) Arturo Merzario	(Italy) Autodelta SpA	Alfa Romeo T33/SC/12	500 km (310 mi)	Coppa Florio	World Sportscar Championship (Group 6)	report
1978	(Italy) "Gimax" (Italy) Giorgio Francia		Osella PA6-BMW	1 hour, 20 minutes	Coppa Florio	European Sportscar Championship	report
1979	(Italy) Lella Lombardi (Italy) Enrico Grimaldi	(Italy) Scuderia Torino Corse	Osella PA7-BMW	6 hours	Coppa Florio	World Sportscar Championship	report
1980	(Italy) "Amphicar"		Osella PA7	30 minutes	Coppa Florio	Italian Group 6 Championship	report
1981	(Spain) Emilio de Villota (United Kingdom) Guy Edwards	(United Kingdom) Grid Team Lola	Lola T600-Ford	6 hours	Coppa Florio	World Sportscar Championship	report
1982-1998: Not held
1999	(Italy) Emanuele Moncini (Italy) Christian Pescatori	(Italy) BMS Scuderia Italia	Ferrari 333 SP	2 hours, 30 minutes	2 hours, 30 minutes of Pergusa	Sports Racing World Cup	report
