= Vallelunga Circuit =

Motorsport venue in Italy

Autodromo di Vallelunga "Piero Taruffi"
- International Circuit (2005–present)

- The historic international layout used from 1971
- Location: Campagnano di Roma, Italy
- Coordinates: 42°9′39″N 12°22′9″E
- Capacity: 32,000
- FIA Grade: 2
- Owner: Automobile Club d'Italia (1967–present)
- Opened: November 1951; 74 years ago (dirt track); 1 December 1957; 68 years ago (asphalt track)
- Former names: Autodromo di Vallelunga (1951–2005)
- Major events: Current: NASCAR Euro Series (2020–present); Former: WTCR Race of Italy (2022); TCR World Tour (2023–2024); TCR Europe (2024); FIA ETCR (2021–2022); 6 Hours of Rome (1973, 1976–1980, 1994–2018, 2020); Rome Grand Prix (1963–1969, 1971, 1973–1989, 1991); World SBK (2007–2008); FIM EWC (2002–2005); FREC (2019–2020); International GT Open (2007–2008); World Sportscar Championship (1973, 1976–1980)
- Website: https://motorsport.vallelunga.it/

International Circuit (2005–present)
- Length: 4.085 km (2.538 mi)
- Turns: 15
- Race lap record: 1:23.475 ( (Spain) Andy Soucek, Panoz DP09, 2008, Superleague Formula)

International Motorcycle Circuit (2005–present)
- Length: 4.110 km (2.554 mi)
- Turns: 16
- Race lap record: 1:36.084 ( (Italy) Lorenzo Savadori, Aprilia RSV4, 2020, Superbike)

Historic International Circuit (2005–present) International Circuit (1971–2004)
- Length: 3.222 km (2.002 mi)
- Turns: 13
- Race lap record: 1:05.162 ( (Italy) Thomas Biagi, Lola T96/50, 2000, F3000)

Club Circuit (1971–present)
- Length: 1.747 km (1.086 mi)
- Turns: 6
- Race lap record: 0:49.100 ( (Italy) "Gimax", Osella PA7, 1979, Group 6)

International Circuit (1963–1970)
- Length: 3.120 km (1.939 mi)
- Turns: 13
- Race lap record: 1:15.700 ( (France) Johnny Servoz-Gavin, Matra MS7, 1969, F2)

Club Circuit (1957–1970)
- Length: 1.703 km (1.058 mi)
- Turns: 6
- Race lap record: 0:58.100 ( (Italy) Nino Vaccarella, Cooper T51, 1961, F1)

The Autodromo di Vallelunga Piero Taruffi is a racing circuit situated 32 km (20 mi) north of Rome, Italy, near Vallelunga of Campagnano. Vallelunga was built as a 1.773 km (1.102 mi) sand oval in 1951.

== History ==
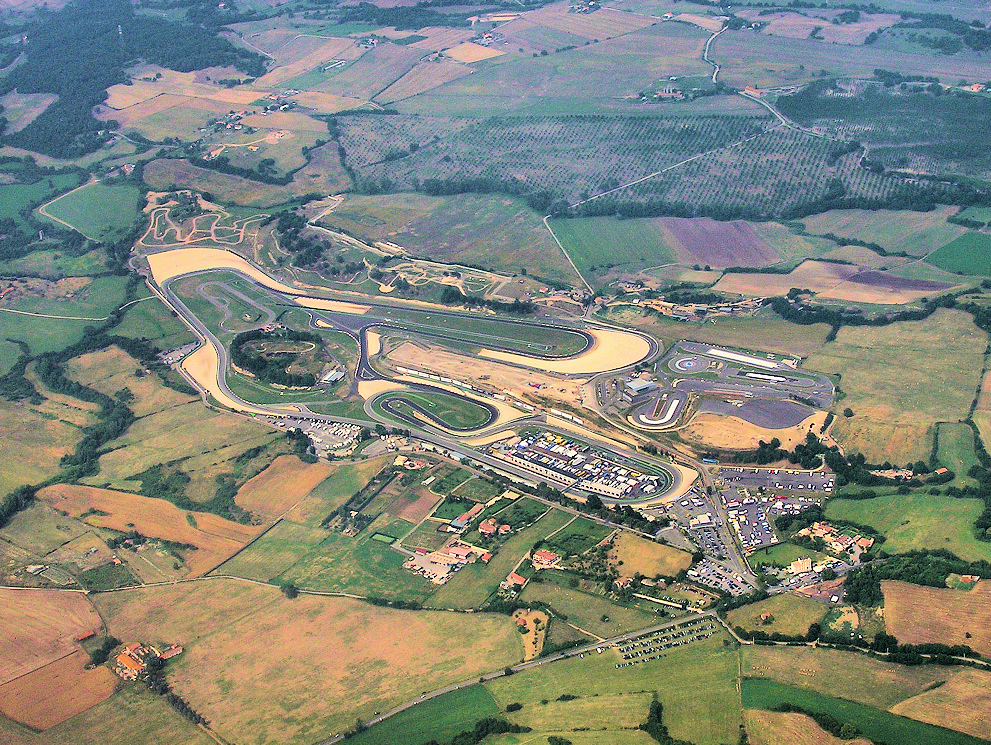
Aerial view of Vallelunga Circuit

From 1963 the circuit held the Rome Grand Prix, and in 1967 a new loop was added when the track became the property of the Automobile Club d'Italia (ACI). Further refurbishment was undertaken in 1971 and significant expansion and renovation works in 2005 and a new box in the summer of 2006. The track is named for the famous Italian racing driver Piero Taruffi since 12th October 2006.

In August 2004 work started on a 0.863 km (0.536 mi) extension to the track, bringing the track up to its current length. The new configuration has received homologation from the FIA as a test circuit, being used by various Formula One teams. The circuit has also hosted the 6 Hours of Vallelunga endurance event.

The track is also used by ACI for public driving safety training courses and, in autumn of each year, hosts a vast flea-market specialising mainly in vintage automotive spare parts.

The circuit is home to simulation software developers Kunos Simulazioni, who occupy a pit garage as an office.

== Events ==
Current

- April: TCR European Endurance Touring Car Series FX Racing Weekend Vallelunga
- May: Italian GT Championship ACI Racing Weekend Vallelunga, Italian F4 Championship, TCR Italian Series, Drift Masters
- July: E4 Championship ACI Racing Weekend Vallelunga, F2000 Italian Formula Trophy, Porsche Carrera Cup Italy
- September: NASCAR Euro Series NASCAR GP Italy - American Festival of Rome
- October: CIV Superbike Championship

Former

- 6 Hours of Rome (1973, 1976–1980, 1994–2018, 2020)
- BPR Global GT Series (1994)
- Eurocup Formula Renault (1999)
- European Formula Two Championship
  - Rome Grand Prix (1967–1969, 1971, 1973–1984)
- European Touring Car Championship (1974, 1976, 1979–1985, 1988, 2000)
- European Touring Car Cup (2005)
- Euroseries 3000 (1999–2002, 2005–2009)
- EuroV8 Series (2014)
- Ferrari Challenge Europe (2008, 2012)
- Ferrari Challenge Finali Mondiali (1999)
- FIA ETCR – eTouring Car World Cup (2021–2022)
- FIA European Formula 3 Championship (1976–1979, 1981, 1983)
- FIA Formula 3 European Championship (2013)
- FIA Motorsport Games (2019)
- FIM Endurance World Championship (2002–2005)
- Formula Abarth Italian Championship (2006, 2008–2014)
- Formula Regional European Championship (2019–2020)
- Formula Renault 2.0 Alps (2013)
- French Formula Renault Championship (1985)
- IMSA European Le Mans (2001)
- International Formula 3000
  - Rome Grand Prix (1985–1989, 1991)
- International GT Open (2007–2008)
- International GTSprint Series (2010–2013)
- Italian Formula Renault Championship (2000–2008, 2010, 2012)
- Italian Formula Three Championship (1972–1973, 1975, 1977–2012)
- Lamborghini Super Trofeo Europe (2010, 2023)
- Lamborghini Super Trofeo World Final (2013, 2018, 2023)
- Superbike World Championship (2007–2008)
- Supersport World Championship (2007–2008)
- Superleague Formula (2008)
- Superstars Series (2004–2013)
- TCR Europe Touring Car Series (2024)
- TCR World Tour (2023–2024)
- World Sportscar Championship (1973, 1976–1980)
- World Touring Car Cup
  - FIA WTCR Race of Italy (2022)

== Lap records ==
The outright unofficial all-time track record for the current International Circuit layout is 1:12.804, set by Anthony Davidson in a Honda RA106, during Formula One testing in April 2006. The outright track record for the former International Circuit (now the Historic International Circuit) is 0:56.335 seconds, set by Luca Badoer in a Ferrari F2004, during Formula One testing in October 2004. As of October 2026, the fastest official race lap records at the ACI Vallelunga Circuit are listed as:

Category	Time	Driver	Vehicle	Event
International Circuit (2005–present): 4.085 km (2.538 mi)
Superleague Formula	1:23.475	Andy Soucek	Panoz DP09	2008 Vallelunga Superleague Formula round
F3000	1:25.062	Roldán Rodríguez	Lola B02/50	2006 Vallelunga Euroseries 3000 round
LMP2	1:28.888	Jérôme d'Ambrosio	Courage C65	2006 6 Hours of Vallelunga
Formula Three	1:29.331	Alex Lynn	Dallara F312	2013 Vallelunga Formula 3 round
CN	1:29.781	Luca Pirri	Wolf GB08	2018 6 Hours of Vallelunga
Formula Regional	1:29.970	Enzo Fittipaldi	Tatuus F3 T-318	2019 Vallelunga FREC round
LMP3	1:30.010	Mikkel Jensen	Ligier JS P3	2017 6 Hours of Vallelunga
GT3	1:31.605	Matteo Malucelli	Ferrari 488 GT3	2017 Vallelunga Italian GT round
Lamborghini Super Trofeo	1:31.900	Giacomo Altoè	Lamborghini Huracán Super Trofeo	2018 Lamborghini Super Trofeo World Final
Formula Abarth	1:32.843	Patric Niederhauser	Tatuus FA010	2011 Vallelunga Formula Abarth round
Formula 4	1:32.995	Enzo Fittipaldi	Tatuus F4-T014	2018 Vallelunga Italian F4 round
Ferrari Challenge	1:33.483	Stefano Gai	Ferrari 296 Challenge	2025 Vallelunga Italian GT round
Formula Renault 2.0	1:33.584	Bruno Bonifacio	Tatuus FR2.0/13	2013 Vallelunga Formula Renault 2.0 Alps round
Porsche Carrera Cup	1:34.251	Emil Skaras	Porsche 911 (991 II) GT3 Cup	2020 Vallelunga Porsche Carrera Cup Italia round
GT2	1:36.338	Giancarlo Fisichella	Ferrari F430 GTC	2010 6 Hours of Vallelunga
TCR Touring Car	1:40.003	Nicola Baldan	Audi RS 3 LMS TCR (2021)	2025 Vallelunga TCR Italy round
Stock car racing	1:40.814	Vittorio Ghirelli	Chevrolet Camaro NASCAR	2024 Vallelunga NASCAR Whelen Euro Series round
GT4	1:41.278	Giacomo Maman	BMW M4 GT4 Evo	2026 Vallelunga GT4 Italy round
Super 2000	1:42.129	Salvatore Tavano	Alfa Romeo 156 GTA Super 2000	2005 European Touring Car Cup
Renault Clio Cup	1.51.025	Massimilliano Danetti	Renault Clio R.S. IV	2020 Vallelunga Renault Clio Cup Italy round
Motorcycle Circuit (2005–present): 4.110 km (2.554 mi)
Superbike	1:36.084	Lorenzo Savadori	Aprilia RSV4	2020 Vallelunga CIV Superbike round
World SBK	1:37.072	Troy Corser	Yamaha YZF-R1	2008 Vallelunga World SBK round
Supersport	1:38.638	Niccolò Antonelli	Yamaha YZF-R9	2026 Vallelunga CIV Supersport round
World SSP	1:39.417	Broc Parkes	Yamaha YZF-R6	2008 Vallelunga World SSP round
Sportbike	1:42.320	Paolo Grassia	Aprilia RS660	2025 Vallelunga CIV Sportbike round
Supersport 300	1:48.923	Matteo Vannucci	Yamaha YZF-R3	2022 Vallelunga CIV Supersport 300 round
ETCR Circuit (2021–present): 3.243 km (2.015 mi)
ETCR	1:22.030	Mikel Azcona	Hyundai Veloster N ETCR	2022 Vallelunga FIA ETCR round
Historic International Circuit (1971–present): 3.222 km (2.002 mi)
F3000	1:05.162	Thomas Biagi	Lola T96/50	2000 2nd Vallelunga Italian F3000 round
LMP1	1:06.618	Angelo Lancelotti	Lister Storm LMP	2004 6 Hours of Vallelunga
WSC	1:07.155	Luca Riccitelli	Riley & Scott Mk III	2000 6 Hours of Vallelunga
Formula Two	1:07.380	Mike Thackwell	Ralt RH6/84	1984 Rome Grand Prix
LMP900	1:08.207	Gary Formato	Panoz LMP-1 Roadster-S	2001 ELMS at Vallelunga
Formula Three	1:09.203	Alex Müller	Dallara F302	2005 Vallelunga Italian F3 round
Group 6	1:09.700	Tim Schenken	Ferrari 312 PB	1973 6 Hours of Vallelunga
LMP675	1:10.198	Fabio Mancini	Lucchini SR2002	2003 6 Hours of Vallelunga
GT1 (GTS)	1:10.769	Ian McKellar Jr.	Saleen S7-R	2001 ELMS at Vallelunga
Formula Renault 2.0	1:10.905	Kohei Hirate	Tatuus FR2000	2004 Vallelunga Formula Renault 2000 Italia round
Formula One	1:11.060	Emerson Fittipaldi	Lotus 72D	1972 Italian Republic Grand Prix
Super Touring	1:14.060	Nicola Larini	Alfa Romeo 156 D2	1999 Vallelunga Italian Superturismo round
GT1	1:14.635	Anders Olofsson	Ferrari F40 GTE	1995 6 Hours of Vallelunga
Sports 2000	1:14.900	Giorgio Francia	Osella PA5	1977 Vallelunga Group 6 race
Group 5	1:15.140	Jacky Ickx	Porsche 935/78	1978 6 Hours of Vallelunga
TCR Touring Car	1:15.763	Nathanaël Berthon	Audi RS 3 LMS TCR (2021)	2022 WTCR Race of Italy
Group A	1:16.122	Nicola Larini	Alfa Romeo 155 GTA	1992 Vallelunga Italian Superturismo round
Group 4	1:23.000	Leo Kinnunen	Porsche 934	1976 6 Hours of Vallelunga
Group 2	1:23.020	Bruno Giacomelli	BMW 3.0 CSL	1979 Vallelunga ETCC round
Club Circuit (1971–present): 1.747 km (1.086 mi)
Group 6	0:49.100	"Gimax"	Osella PA7	1979 Vallelunga Group 6 race
ETCR	0:52.322	Mikel Azcona	Cupra e-Racer	2021 Vallelunga Pure ETCR round
Group 5	0:54.600	Luigi Moreschi	BMW 320i Turbo	1979 Vallelunga Group 5 race
Motorcycle Circuit (1987–2005): 3.253 km (2.021 mi)
Superbike	1:18.802	Lucio Pedercini	Ducati 998	2003 Vallelunga CIV Superbike round
Supersport	1:20.013	Massimo Roccoli	Yamaha YZF-R6	2004 2nd Vallelunga CIV Supersport round
International Circuit (1963–1970): 3.120 km (1.939 mi)
Formula Two	1:15.700	Johnny Servoz-Gavin	Matra MS7	1969 Rome Grand Prix
Group 6	1:25.100	Andrea de Adamich	Alfa Romeo T33	1967 V° Trofeo Ettore Bettoja Vallelunga
Formula One	1:29.000	Bob Anderson	Lola Mk4	1963 Rome Grand Prix
Group 4	1:30.600	Lorenzo Bandini	Ferrari Dino 166 P	1964 Roma Grand Prix
Group 3	1:34.300	Franco Failli	Ferrari 275 GTB/C	1967 Trofeo Ettore Bettoja Vallelunga
Club Circuit (1957–1970): 1.703 km (1.058 mi)
Formula One	0:58.100	Nino Vaccarella	Cooper T51	1961 Coppa Italia
Group 4	0:59.000	"Noris"	Porsche 906	1966 Coppa Settecolli
Group 3	1:05.100	Lorenzo Bandini	Abarth Simca 1300 GT	1962 Vallelunga Grand Touring race
