= Italian Championship =

Italian Championships or Italian Championship may refer to:

== Athletics ==
- Italian Athletics Championships
- Italian Athletics Clubs Championships
- Italian Athletics Indoor Championships
- Italian Cross Country Championships
- Italian Long Distance Mountain Running Championships
- Italian Mountain Running Championships
- Italian Skyrunning Championships
- Italian Vertical Kilometer Championships
- Italian Winter Throwing Championships

== Motorsports ==
- Italian Championship Group 6 (1976–1983) (racing cars)
- Italian F4 Championship (racing cars)
- Italian Formula Renault Championship (2000-2012) (formula Renault)
- Italian Formula Three Championship (formula three)
- Italian GT Championship (sports cars)
- Italian Rally Championship (rally)
- Italian Superturismo Championship (touring-type sports cars)

== Team sport ==
- Italian Baseball League (baseball)
- Lega Basket Serie A (basketball)
- Divisione Nazionale (football, 1926–1929)
- Serie A (football)
- Serie A (handball)
- Serie A (ice hockey)
- Lega Nazionale Hockey (roller hockey)
- Serie A (rugby union)
- Italian Volleyball League (volleyball)
- Serie A1 (water polo)

== Others ==
- Italian Alpine Ski Championships (alpine skiing)
- Italian Artistic Gymnastics Championships (artistic gymnastics)
- Italian National Badminton Championships (badminton)
- Italian Chess Championship (chess)
- Italian Curling Championship (curling)
- Italian National Road Race Championships (cycling)
- Italian National Cyclo-cross Championships (cyclo-cross)
- Italian Figure Skating Championships (figure skating)
- Italian Tennis Championships (tennis)
