= Kas Kastner =

American racing engineer (1928–2021)

- Born: 30 August 1928; Batavia, New York
- Died: 11 April 2021 (aged 92)

Robert William Kastner (30 August 1928 – 11 April 2021), commonly known as R.W. Kastner or Kas Kastner, was a builder and tuner of racing cars, a racing driver, and an author. He also raced sailing boats competitively. At different times he was Director of Motorsports in the United States for both the Triumph Motor Company and Nissan. Kastner has been called one of the most influential Americans in the history of Triumph cars. He coined the maxim "Never be beaten by equipment."

== Early years ==
Kastner was born in Batavia, New York. He graduated High School in 1945, then enlisted in the US Army for a two-year stint, during which he was stationed at Fort Carlson in Colorado. After his discharge he returned to Batavia briefly, where he taught himself to drive in a 1934 Plymouth. He soon returned to Colorado where he earned a living in a variety of jobs, including managing the pool-hall portion of a large bar, where he earned some extra money hustling pool. His next stop was working as a mechanic at a Chevrolet dealership in Delta, Colorado. In 1951 he bought his first sports car, a Crosley Super Sport, on the basis of a road test by Tom McCahill in Mechanix Illustrated.

Kastner then moved to Salt Lake City, Utah, where he bought an MG TD in 1952. He acquired a copy of the factory tuning manual for the TD, and with it taught himself how to repair and modify the car. To earn a living he worked as a plater of baby shoes, a credit manager for a Chevrolet dealer and a railroad telegrapher for Union Pacific. He continued to acquire manuals for imported cars and ordered English standard tools from overseas, over time becoming the local expert on foreign cars. After working as the manager of an MG/Jaguar distributor, in 1953 he opened his own automotive repair shop.

Seeing Ken Miles race his R1 MG Special at Pebble Beach in 1953 inspired Kastner to build his own special. He built his car with an engine and chassis from an MG and bodywork of 0.019 in (0.5 mm) thick aluminum paneling that was screwed in place to a framework made of welded electrical conduit. This car was eventually followed by another home-built MG Special. His first race was on the streets of Aspen, Colorado, where he placed second and won his class. From there he went on to compete in several hill climbs and other events. He first raced a Triumph in 1954 at Steamboat Springs, Colorado.

== Triumph ==
In 1956, Kastner moved with his wife and two children to California, where he went to work for Williamson Motors in Los Angeles as a mechanic. Less than 3 months later Kastner was their service manager. While still racing his MG-powered Special, Kastner went to work for Cal Sales, the Triumph distributor for the Western United States, in Gardenia, California as a mechanic. By June 1958 he had risen to the position of service and parts supervisor, where he managed a staff of 70.

Kastner continued to race, winning the 1959 Class E Championship with the California Sports Car Club and the SCCA national title. He also served as chief instructor for the California Sports Car Club at Riverside Raceway and as the National Licensing Chairman for the SCCA, as well as winning the SCCA's annual award for Best Technical Article (1963).

Kastner developed a reputation for getting more power out of the Triumph engine than anyone else, the factory included. He used well-known methods like porting and polishing ports and milling the heads to increase the compression ratio to as much as 12.6:1. Kastner and Dean Moon collaborated to develop a camshaft profile able to provide 150 hp (111.9 kW) with the factory SU carbs. When the Triumph factory questioned Kastner's claimed outputs, he shipped an engine to England, where it developed 152 hp (113.3 kW) on Triumph's own dynamometer.

The Cal Sales distributorship was purchased by the Triumph parent company in October 1960. Company policy barred any company executive from racing, including Kastner. He stopped racing, but continued building performance parts in his own garage, which he then sold to Cal Sales. He began to write manuals on how to tune and prepare Triumph cars for racing. He also instituted a driver assistance program, providing financial support for successful club racers.

In 1963, Kastner took three factory stock TR4s, prepared them, and took them to the 12 Hours of Sebring, where they finished first, second, and fourth in the 2.5 GT class. When Kastner asked to be compensated for the work he did preparing the Sebring cars, the president of Triumph refused. Kastner called Carroll Shelby, who offered him a position and a large increase in pay.

Triumph countered Shelby by offering to match the salary if Kastner would stay to establish and run a new US competition department. Kastner opted to stay. Bob Tullius was his principal driver. They won the SCCA E-Production title, and after being pushed up to D-Production, won that class twice.

Kastner's next project was preparing three TR4s for the 1964 Shell 4000 Rally from Vancouver to Montreal in Canada. The Triumph team won the GT Team prize for the five-day race.

Kastner fielded three Spitfires at Sebring in 1965, where they placed 29th and 30th overall with one DNF.

The Macau Spitfire was a special lightweight model built by the factory specifically to race in the 1965 Macau Grand Prix. The car had an all-aluminum tub, a single seat with a cover over the passenger's area, a head-fairing behind the driver and a Le Mans nose. The original engine was a Le Mans 70X displacing 1,147 cc (70.0 cu in) and producing 109 hp (81.3 kW). Power went to the rear through a GT6 transmission. The car finished third in the Grand Prix, after which it was shipped back to Coventry. In 1966 the car was sent to California, where Kastner substituted a 200 hp (149.1 kW) 2 L inline six and a TR4 transmission, added a larger radiator and fuel tank and modified the hood with a scoop to clear the longer engine. After racing the car briefly it was sold.

Kastner sent four TR4As to Sebring again in 1966, where they placed first, second and third in the 2.5 GT class.

In 1966 the SCCA would not homologate the new TR4A. As a concession they would allow it to race in the more competitive D-modified class. Kastner prepared a special "Super Stock" TR4A with fiberglass body panels and alloy wheels that helped reduce total weight to 1,700 lb (771.1 kg), and added a 160 hp (119.3 kW) engine. Special attention was paid to the new independent rear-suspension. The car won the 1966 D-modified National Championship.

The year after the team's 1-2-3 finish at Sebring, Kastner took a specially prepared TR4A to the Bonneville Salt Flats. This car received a full-width roll-bar, heavy duty springs, shock absorbers and axles, and a locked differential. The engine was bored out to 87 mm (3.4 in) to increase displacement to 2,187 cc (133.5 cu in), and was brought to the same level of tune as the Sebring cars, producing just over 140 hp (104.4 kW). At the Bonneville Nationals that year the car beat the previous record, but was in turn bettered by a tuned Daimler. The car then appeared at various drag strips in Southern California where it set several track records.

Kastner went to Triumph headquarters in Coventry to pitch a project for a new aerodynamic race car to run at Sebring. Reportedly all Kastner took with him was his reputation, a promise of a magazine cover page, and a single rough drawing done by Pete Brock, designer of the Shelby Daytona coupe. Kastner and Brock had been talking about this project for several years prior to Kastner's trip to England. Triumph approved the project, and provided a budget of $25,000. The car, christened the TR-250K, was based on a standard Triumph independent rear suspension chassis, but with a tubular structure added to support the alloy bodywork. Kastner moved the 2.5 L six-cylinder engine back 9.5 in (241 mm) in the chassis. The car used the fuel-injected engine from the TR5 as a base rather than the carburetted TR250 engine. Kastner also mentioned the Rover V8 engine as a possible future power-plant. Other changes were brakes from Airheart and a Corvette aluminum radiator. The aluminum bodywork, just 0.050 in (1 mm) thick, was strikingly sleek, and included a movable rear spoiler to control down-force. The finished car weighted just 1,550 lb (703.1 kg). Targeted at SCCA C-Production class, the TR-250K was raced at Sebring in 1968 but retired when a rear wheel, which had come from a Chaparral and had been machined to fit the Triumph hubs, broke and damaged the suspension.

Kastner left Triumph in 1970.

== After Triumph ==
Following his departure from Triumph, Kastner formed Kastner-Brophy Inc., and Kastner Brophy Racing with Los Angeles advertising executive and media personality John Brophy. The partners would both race their own cars and prepare cars and consult for other teams. Kastner-Brophy fielded a Triumph Vitesse in the Trans-Am series. Nicknamed the "Candybox" by Kastner's then-girlfriend for its bright, garish paint scheme, Kastner added Carillo rods, a lightened crankshaft, a Cline head and Weber carburetors to the 2.0 L straight-six engine. Power output was 245 bhp (182.7 kW). The car debuted at Road America, Elkhart Lake, Wisconsin on 17 July 1971, where it finished in eleventh place and earned a single championship point. Engine failures and tire problems plagued it for the rest of the season. Triumph stopped production of the Vitesse in 1971, and Kastner sold the car in 1973. The Kastner-Brophy stable also included two Triumph TR6s, a Spitfire and a GT6. They also bought a Lola T192, which was first loaned to George Bignotti for the 1971 Questor Grand Prix, where it was driven by Al Unser. Kastner-Brophy then raced the Lola in the SCCA Formula Continental series, with driver Jim Dittemore. Their highest finish was first in the "Seafair 200" at Pacific Raceways in 1971.

Kastner merged with Roy Woods Racing in 1973, becoming vice president and general manager. With sponsorship from Carling Black Label beer, Kastner led the team's efforts in Can-Am, Formula 5000 as well as three Indy 500 races.

Around this time, Kastner took up sailboat racing, winning a National Championship title for 13-foot Cyclone boats and another in the 30-foot keel boats class, in addition to several Fleet and District Championships. Attempts to turn his interest in sailing into viable businesses were unsuccessful.

Discussions with friend and early turbocharging expert Hugh MacInnes led Kastner to establish Arkay Incorporated in Hawthorne California. Arkay developed complete kits for aftermarket turbocharger installations for a wide variety of cars and engines. Arkay were also involved in general development and suspension work. NASA used Arkay-supplied parts in their evaluation of turbocharged rotary engines for aircraft use.

Through Arkay, Kastner was involved in a plan to sell a modified version of the AC 3000ME in the United States. One 3000ME chassis was shipped to the Arkay shops, where possible drivetrains, including a Chevrolet V6 and Ford inline-four, were evaluated. Eventually a Buick V6 was installed, but Buick pulled out of the project shortly after. Shelby employee Ray Geddes saw the car in Kastner's shop and got Shelby involved. At the time Shelby was working with Chrysler, for whom Kastner had already done a turbocharged 2.2 L engine. The project was renamed the Shelby ME 2.2 Turbo, but did not reach production.

Kastner sold Arkay Incorporated in 1985.

== Nissan ==
In 1986, Kastner was offered the position of National Motorsports Manager for Nissan by Nissan Marketing Director John Borgen. This put him in charge of the off-road truck programs, the amateur racing program, the showroom stock racing programs, and the GTP program. At the time, some of Nissan's upper management wanted to terminate the GTP program, which was operated by the Electramotive Team. Kastner hired Ashley Page as team manager and Trevor Harris as team engineer.

Kastner and his new GTP staff started making changes. The chassis was redesigned. A different gearbox was selected. Problems with tire supplies were resolved when Goodyear agreed to supply the team. A new all-aluminum engine block was developed by Electramotive.

At Kastner's direction, Electramotive was bought outright by Nissan, and a new group, Nissan Performance Technology Incorporated (NPTI), was established in Vista California with Kastner as Vice President of Operations. At NPTI Kastner had a team of over 225 working for him. Economic problems later forced Nissan to focus exclusively on their IMSA production efforts. All plans for the subsequent GTP season and all drivers contracts were cancelled. The team was disbanded, and Kastner formally retired from racing.

During Kastner's tenure, the Team Nissan GTP car won the drivers championship four years in a row, and the Manufacturers Championship three years in a row. In 1988 they won 8 consecutive GTP events.

== Personal life ==
Kastner's first wife died in 1997. He married long-time friend Peggy DeMerritt in November 2000. It was Peggy who encouraged him to get involved in vintage racing.

Kastner served as grand marshal at several vintage racing events, including the Kastner Cup, which is awarded to one Triumph competitor each year.

In 2016, Kastner received the Harry Webster award for his contributions to the Standard Triumph movement. Kastner was inducted into the British Sports Car Hall of Fame in 2017.

Kastner died 11 April 2021, aged 92.
