= Hurlock =

The name Hurlock can mean:

- Hurlock, Maryland, a town in the United States
- Madeline Hurlock (1899-1989), a silent film actress
- Derek Hurlock (1920–1992), a British businessman who was managing director and chairman of AC Cars
- Terry Hurlock (born 1958), a former professional footballer
- A type of Darkspawn creature in the Dragon Age media franchise
