= Osella PA8 =

Sports car prototype

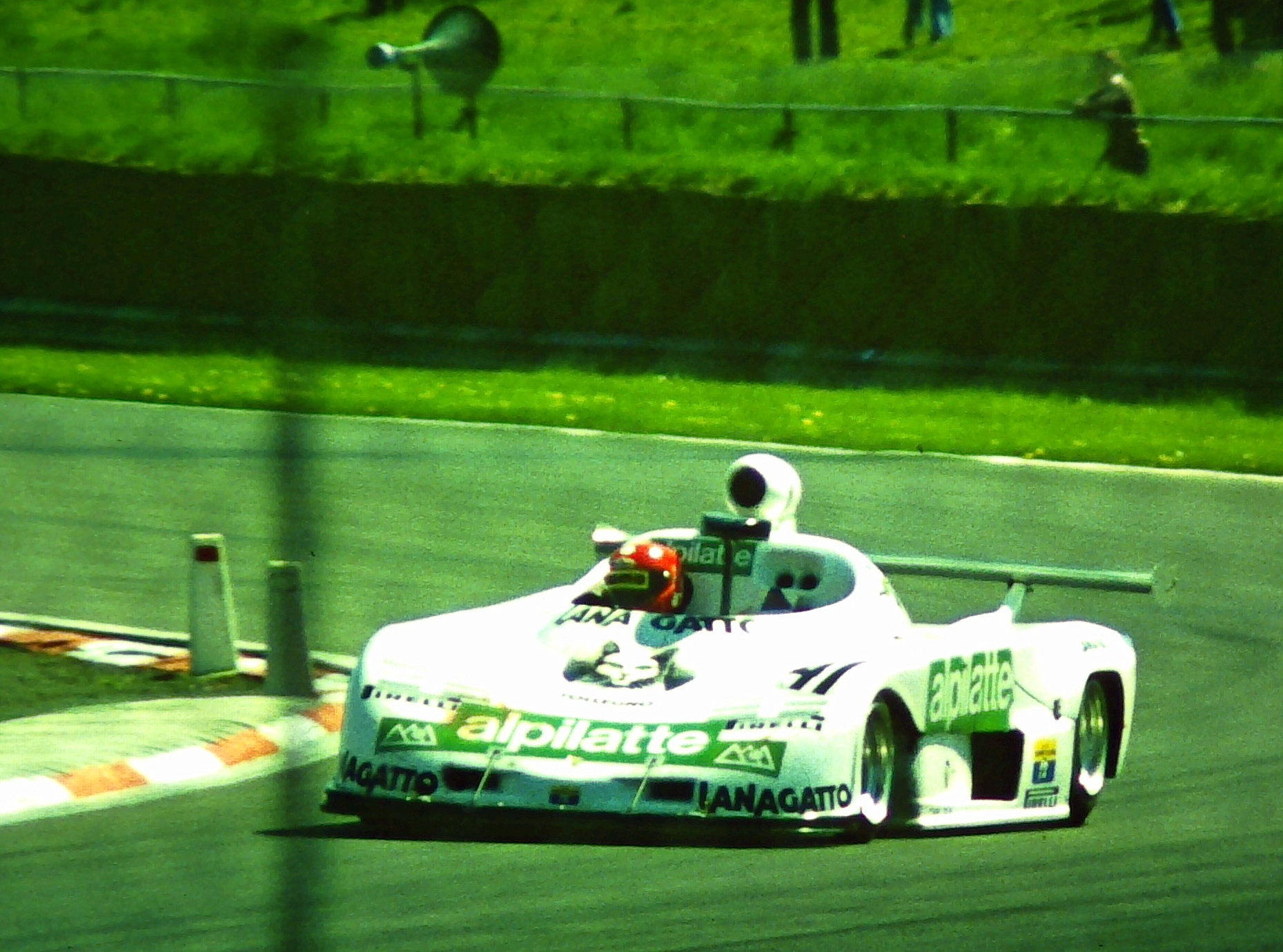
Front-view Vittorio Brambilla in the Osella PA8

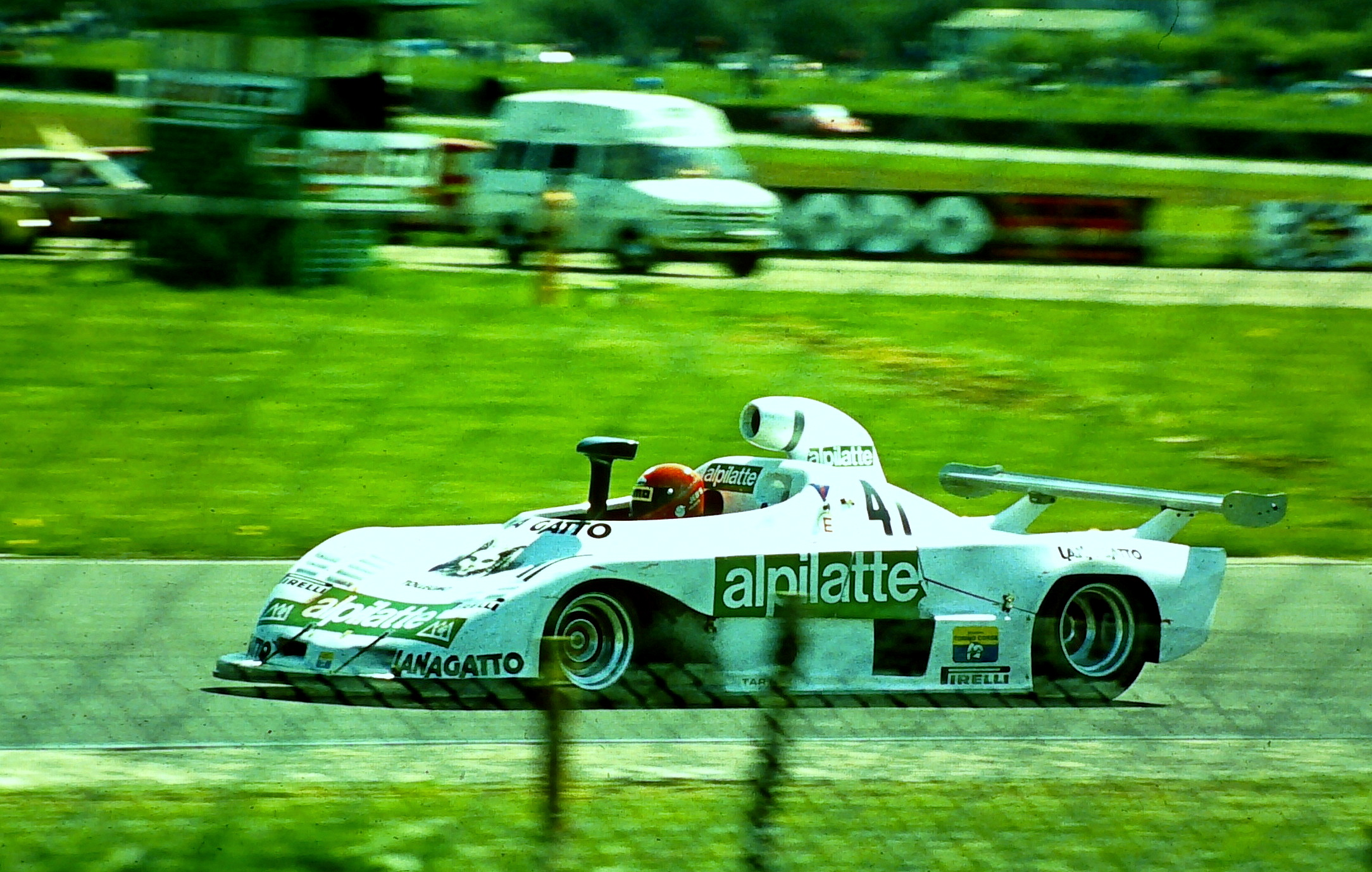
Side-view of Vittorio Brambilla in the Osella PA8

The Osella PA8 was a 2-liter, Group 6 (Sports 2000), sports car prototype, developed by Osella Squadra Corse in 1980, and used in sports car and Hillclimb races until 1988. It is powered by the naturally aspirated, 300 hp (220 kW), 2.0 L (120 cu in) BMW M12/7 engine, drives the rear wheels via a 5-speed Hewland LGA manual transmission.

== Development ==
Osella has been active as a producer of racing vehicles for sports car racing since the early 1970s. The first of these prototypes was the PA3, which appeared in 1974. The PA8 was the sixth model in the order of types, succeeding the PA7. What all PA prototypes of the 1980s had in common was that they were largely based on the PA3 and were only development stages of this racing car. Like the PA7, the PA8 was developed for the 2-liter racing formula. The racing vehicles were entered either in the Italian Group 6 Championship or the class for sports cars with a displacement of up to two liters in the World Sports Car Championship. From the mid-1980s, this car model was also used in the French Group 6 championship and the Interserie. The engines came almost exclusively from BMW, either the M12 2-liter engine from Formula 2 or, later in Interserie, the M12/13 1.5-liter turbo units, which had their origin in Formula 1.

== Racing Background ==
The PA8 made its racing debut in March 1980 at the Brands Hatch 6 Hours, the second round of the 1980 World Sportscar Championship. Lella Lombardi and Marco Rocca drove the factory car. The duo could not finish the race after an accident. Giorgio Francia celebrated his first race victory two weeks later at the Italian Group 6 championship race in Varano and, after five more victories, secured the championship title in a superior fashion.

In the 1980 24 Hours of Le Mans, Lella Lombardi and Mark Thatcher, son of former British Prime Minister Margaret Thatcher, piloted the works PA8. The race ended prematurely after 157 laps driven to an accident.

In 1981, the PA8s were replaced at the factory by the PA9s, and the existing chassis were sold to private teams. However, some drivers continued to use their racing cars successfully. Bruno Sotty won the 1985 Group 6 French Championship overall ahead of fellow make and type competitors José Thibault and Jean-Claude Justice.
