= Capoferri M1 =

- Category: Group 6
- Constructor: Capoferri
- Designer: Renzo Zorzi

Technical specifications
- Chassis: Aluminum monocoque covered in glass fiber-reinforced plastic panels
- Suspension (front): Double wishbone, coil springs over damper, anti-roll bar
- Suspension (rear): Reversed lower suspension, top links, twin trailing arms, coil springs over damper, anti-roll bar
- Length: 4,667 millimetres (183.7 in)
- Width: 2,000 millimetres (79 in)
- Height: 950 millimetres (37 in)
- Axle track: 1,270 millimetres (50 in) (Front); 1,280 millimetres (50 in)
- Wheelbase: 2,660 millimetres (105 in)
- Engine: Ford-Cosworth DFV 3.0 L (183 cu in) V8 engine twin-turbocharged mid-engined
- Transmission: Hewland DG-300 5-speed manual
- Power: 445 hp (332 kW); 250 lb⋅ft (340 N⋅m) of torque
- Weight: 667 kilograms (1,470 lb)

Competition history
Entries	Races	Wins	Podiums	Poles
4	4	1	0	0

The Capoferri M1 was a Group 6 sports prototype race car, designed, developed and built by Renzo Zorzi, in 1979. It was closely based on, and took similar design cues from the similar Lola T286, which was also a racing prototype. It won a single race, at Enna-Pergusa, in 1980, where it also won in its class, and took pole position for the race. Similar to the Lola, it was powered by a 3.0 L (180 cu in) naturally-aspirated Ford-Cosworth DFV V8 engine, producing around 445 hp (332 kW) @ 10,500 rpm.
