= 6 Hours of Vallelunga =

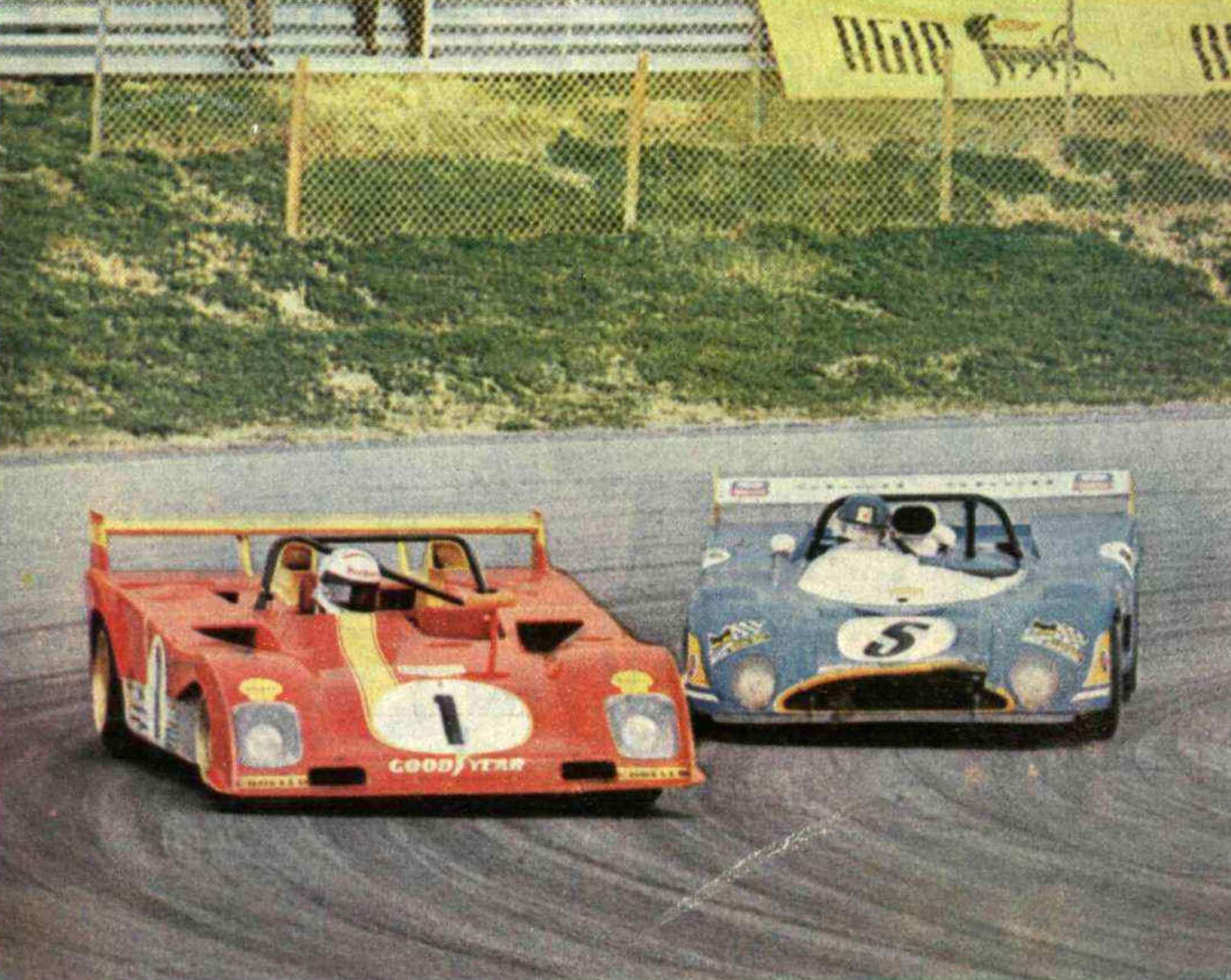
Brian Redman on Ferrari 312 PB ahead Gérard Larrousse on Matra-Simca MS670B during the Vallelunga 6-Hours' first edition, 25 March 1973

The 6 Hours of Vallelunga (6 Ore di Vallelunga in Italian), also called 6 Hours of Rome (6 Ore di Roma in Italian), is an endurance sports car racing event held annually at the ACI Vallelunga Circuit in Vallelunga, Italy.

First established in 1973, the six-hour race was initially held as a round of the World Championship for Makes until 1980, when it was no longer included in the World Championship calendar. It was not until 1991 that a six-hour race returned to Vallelunga, briefly part of the Italian GT Championship calendar in 1995 and later in 1999. It was also part of the brief Italian Endurance Challenge in 1997 and 1998. The Vallelunga Circuit was extended in 2005 from 3.2 km (2.0 mi) to 4.1 km (2.5 mi).

The event, currently organized by Peroni Promotion, now runs as a non-championship endurance held as a double weekend in the late autumn and is attended by several international teams.

== Winners ==
| Year | Date | Drivers | Team | Car | Championship |
|---|---|---|---|---|---|
| 1973 | March 25 | (France) Henri Pescarolo (France) Gérard Larrousse (France) François Cevert | (France) Equipe Matra-Simca | Matra-Simca MS670B | World Championship for Makes |
| 1974 – 1975 | not held | | | | |
| 1976 | April 4 | (Belgium) Jacky Ickx (West Germany) Jochen Mass | (West Germany) Martini Racing | Porsche 935 | World Championship for Makes |
| 1977 | October 23 | (Italy) Luigi Moreschi (Italy) "Dino" | (Italy) Scuderia Vesuvio | Porsche 935 | World Championship for Makes |
| 1978 | September 3 | (France) Henri Pescarolo (France) Bob Wollek | (West Germany) Porsche Kremer Racing | Porsche 935/77A | World Championship for Makes |
| 1979 | September 16 | (Italy) Giorgio Francia (Italy) Lella Lombardi | (Italy) Enzo Osella | Osella PA7-BMW | World Championship for Makes |
| 1980 | September 7 | (Italy) Giorgio Franchi (Italy) Roberto Marazzi | (Italy) Giorgio Franchi | Osella PA8-BMW | World Championship for Makes |
| 1981 – 1990 | not held | | | | |
| 1991 | November 17 | (Italy) Daniele Gasparri (Italy) Marco Micangeli (Italy) Carlo Pietromarchi | | BMW 635 CSi | Non-Championship |
| 1992 | November 15 | (Italy) Roberto Ragazzi (Italy) Luigi Taverna (Germany) Heiner Weis | (Italy) Veneto Sport Team | BMW M3 | Non-Championship |
| 1993 | November 21 | (Germany) Alexander Burgstaller (Germany) Altfrid Heger | | BMW M3 GTR | Non-Championship |
| 1994 | October 31 | (Italy) Luciano della Noce (Sweden) Anders Olofsson | (Sweden) Strandell Totip | Ferrari F40 GTE | Non-Championship |
| 1995 | November 19 | (Italy) Luciano della Noce (Sweden) Anders Olofsson | (Italy) Ennea Racing | Ferrari F40 GTE | Coppa GT |
| 1996 | November 17 | (Italy) Luciano della Noce (Italy) Mimmo Schiattarella | (Italy) Euro Racing | Ferrari F40 GTE | Non-Championship |
| 1997 | November 16 | (Germany) Thomas Bscher (Denmark) John Nielsen | (United Kingdom) GTC Competition | McLaren F1 GTR | Challenge Endurance Italia |
| 1998 | November 15 | (Italy) Fabio Mancini (Italy) Denny Zardo | (Italy) Tampolli Racing | Tampolli RTA98-Alfa Romeo | Challenge Endurance Italia |
| 1999 | November 21 | (Italy) Denny Zardo (Italy) Angelo Lancelotti | (Italy) Denny Zardo | Tampolli RTA98-Alfa Romeo | GT Italian Challenge |
| 2000 | November 12 | (Italy) Denny Zardo (Italy) Angelo Lancelotti | (Italy) Tampolli Engineering | Tampolli RTA98-Alfa Romeo | Non-Championship |
| 2001 | November 11 | (Italy) Massimo Saccomanno (Italy) Ernesto Saccomanno | (Italy) Audisio & Benvenuto | Lucchini SR2001-Alfa Romeo | Non-Championship |
| 2002 | November 10 | (Italy) Gianmaria Bruni (Italy) Michele Rugolo (Italy) Leonardo Maddalena | (Italy) Automotive Durango | GMS Durango 01-Judd | Non-Championship |
| 2003 | November 9 | (Italy) Filippo Vita (Italy) Luigi de Luca | (Italy) Team Siliprandi | Lucchini SR2002-Alfa Romeo | Non-Championship |
| 2004 | November 13 | (Italy) Stefano Zonca (Italy) Angelo Lancelotti | (United Kingdom) Lister Racing | Lister Storm LMP-Chevrolet | Non-Championship |
| 2005 | November 13 | (Italy) Davide Mastracci (Italy) Leonardo Maddalena (Italy) Michele Rugolo | (Italy) Racing Box SRL | Maserati MC12 GT1 | Non-Championship |
| 2006 | November 19 | (Portugal) Pedro Lamy (Italy) Marco Cioci (Italy) Piergiuseppe Perazzini | (Italy) Racing Box SRL | Maserati MC12 GT1 | Non-Championship |
| 2007 | November 18 | (Italy) Franco Ghiotto (Italy) Marco Didaio (Italy) Davide Uboldi | (Italy) WRC | Norma M20-BMW | Non-Championship |
| 2008 | November 22 | (Italy) Marco Cioci (Italy) Piergiuseppe Perazzini (Italy) Maurizio Mediani | (Italy) Advanced Engineering | Ferrari F430 GTC | Non-Championship |
| 2009 | November 22 | (Italy) Thomas Biagi (Italy) Filippo Francioni (Italy) Edoardo Piscopo | (Italy) Racing Box SRL | Lola B08/80-Judd | Non-Championship |
| 2010 | November 21 | (Italy) Alessandro Garofano (Italy) Luca Rangoni (Italy) Marco Mapelli | (Italy) AF Corse | Ferrari F430 GTC | Non-Championship |
| 2011 | November 20 | (Italy) Piergiuseppe Perazzini (Italy) Gianmaria Bruni (Italy) Marco Cioci | (Italy) AF Corse | Ferrari F430 GTC | Endurance Champions Cup |
| 2012 | November 25 | (Russia) Aleksandr Skryabin (Italy) Alessandro Balzan (Italy) Alessandro Pier Guidi | (Russia) Estamotorsport | Ferrari 458 Italia GT3 | Dunlop Endurance Champions Cup |
| 2013 | November 17 | (Italy) Andrea Bertolini (Italy) Piergiuseppe Perazzini (Italy) Marco Cioci | (Italy) AF Corse | Ferrari 458 Italia GT3 | Non-championship |
| 2014 | November 16 | (Italy) Giancarlo Fisichella (Italy) Piergiuseppe Perazzini (Italy) Marco Cioci | (Italy) AF Corse | Ferrari 458 Italia GT3 | Non-championship |
| 2015 | November 15 | (Italy) Ivan Bellarosa (Italy) Guglielmo Belotti | (San Marino) Avelon Formula | Wolf GB08-Honda | Non-championship |
| 2016 | November 13 | (Italy) Giorgio Mondini (Italy) Andrea Dromedari (Italy) Davide Uboldi | (United States) Eurointernational | Ligier JS P3-Nissan | Non-championship |
| 2017 | November 12 | (Italy) Marco Cioci (Denmark) Mikkel Jensen (Italy) Piergiuseppe Perazzini | (Italy) AF Corse | Ligier JS P3-Nissan | Non-championship |
| 2018 | November 11 | (Switzerland) Manuel Zumstein (Switzerland) Adrian Zumstein (Switzerland) Philipp Zumstein | (Germany) MDC Sports | Mercedes-AMG GT3 | Non-championship |
