= European Sportscar Championship =

The European Sportscar Championship was a name used by several sports car racing championships based in Europe. Initially created in 1970 by the Fédération Internationale du Sport Automobile (FISA) as the European 2-Litre Sports Car Championship for Makes, the series increased in popularity and eventually became part of the World Sports Car Championship in 1976 even after a troubled 1975 season. Only two years later, as interest in sports-prototypes faded, the championship was downgraded from World Championship status and a European championship returned once more, only to be cancelled after its sole 1978 season.

A European championship for sports cars was created once more in 1983, now named the European Endurance Championship, and combined several events from the World Endurance Championship with other European rounds. The concept was however not continued the following year.

In 2001 the European Endurance Championship was revived by IMSA for a single season as the European Le Mans Series, then in 2004 it was revived by the ACO as the Le Mans Endurance Series.

== History ==
=== 1970 – 1975 ===
By 1970, light open-cockpit sports prototypes which used engines under 2,000 cc (120 cu in) were becoming popular cars in the International Championship for Makes. Chassis manufacturers Lola, Chevron, Abarth, and Porsche all offered cars to customers which were designed for this category, leading FISA to create a championship specifically for these cars and serving as a junior formula for the International Championship. Races varied from 250 km (160 mi) to 500 km (310 mi), and ran either as a single event or in two heats. Grand tourer cars were also allowed to participate, although they were not included in the championship standings.

Ford-powered Chevrons won the inaugural Championship for Makes in the opening 1970 season, leading Lola by a single point. Lola triumphed in 1971, followed by Osella entering the series in partnership with Abarth and dominated the 1972 championship with five victories. Lola won the championship once more in 1973 before the new Alpine A441-Renault swept the 1974 season with nine wins in nine races.

The 1975 season was cancelled shortly after it had begun, only two rounds being completed before rising fuel costs forced a premature end to the championship. FISA however pressed forward with the creation of a World Championship for open-cockpit prototypes, combining not only 2-Litre entries from the European Championship, but also the prototypes with larger engines which had previously run in the World Championship for Makes.

=== 1976 – 1977 ===
During the 1976 and 1977 seasons, FISA established new rules for a Group 6 category of prototypes. 2-Litre sports cars from the former European Championship were part of the new Group 6 classification, competing alongside sports prototypes which used the 3-Litre and 5-Litre engine rules. The new World Sports Car Championship was created exclusively for the Group 6 category. Although a World Championship, only one race was held outside of Europe in 1976 season, and all events were within Europe in 1977.

Porsche's 3-Litre cars won every event in 1976 while Osella's 2-Litre cars were second in the Manufacturer's Championship. Osella once again led the 2-Litre category in 1977 while Alfa Romeo's 3-Litre cars won all eight rounds. At the end of the 1977 season, FISA chose to cancel the World Sports Car Championship in order to concentrate on the World Championship for Makes. The Group 6 category would however be allowed to compete in World Championship for Makes events once again, however they were not allowed to score points towards the Championship.

=== 1978 ===
After the cancellation of the World Sports Car Championship, the European Sports Car Championship was created for 1978 in order to allow Group 6 prototypes to continue to compete for their own championship. Manufacturers no longer were granted their own championship, and emphasis was instead placed on drivers. The series was also separated into two categories, one for the 2-Litre cars and the other for the larger capacity cars. Osellas once again led the 2-Litre field, led by driver "Gimax", who won the 2-Litre Drivers Championship. Porsche driver Reinhold Joest won the other Drivers Championship.

Diminishing support for sports prototypes and the large number of drivers which chose to compete in the Italian Group 6 Championship led FISA to cancel the European Championship outright after 1978. Group 6 cars continued to compete as guests in World Championship for Makes events until 1982 when regulations were once again changed and the Group C category was established.

=== 1983 ===
In 1981, the World Championship for Makes was succeeded by the World Endurance Championship with the introduction of the Group C and Group B regulations. As part of this change, a Drivers Championship was introduced for the first time alongside the Manufacturers Championship. However, as the majority of teams concentrated on the European events which were the majority of the schedule, a third Championship was created in 1983, known as the European Endurance Championship.

The European Endurance Championship was composed of five events which were part of the Manufacturers Championship, as well as three races which were not counted towards the Manufacturers Championship but were well attended by the teams. Porsche driver Bob Wollek won the 1983 Endurance Championship, although he was ranked fifth in the World Championship standings.

After 1983, FISA eliminated the European Endurance Championship, choosing to keep the World Championship for drivers instead.

== Champions ==
European 2-Litre Sports Car Championship for Makes
Year	Manufacturer	Driver
1970	(United Kingdom) Chevron	(Sweden) Jo Bonnier
1971	(United Kingdom) Lola	(Austria) Helmut Marko
1972	(Italy) Abarth-Osella	(Italy) Arturo Merzario
1973	(United Kingdom) Lola	(United Kingdom) Chris Craft
1974	(France) Alpine-Renault	(France) Alain Serpaggi
1975	Cancelled	
European Sports Car Championship
Year	Drivers	
1978	(Germany) Reinhold Joest (Class 1)	
1978	(Italy) "Gimax" (Class 2)	
European Endurance Championship
Year	Driver	
1983	(France) Bob Wollek	
