= Italian Championship Group 6 =

Automobile racing competition

- Category: Sportscar
- Country: Italy
- Inaugural season: 1976
- Folded: 1983

The Campionato Italiano di Gruppo 6, (Italian Championship Group 6), was a domestic championship which took place in Italy for Group 6 and also featured cars that were eligible for World Sportscar Championship when races were shared.
