= Osella PA6/PA7 =

Sports Prototype race car designed and built by Osella

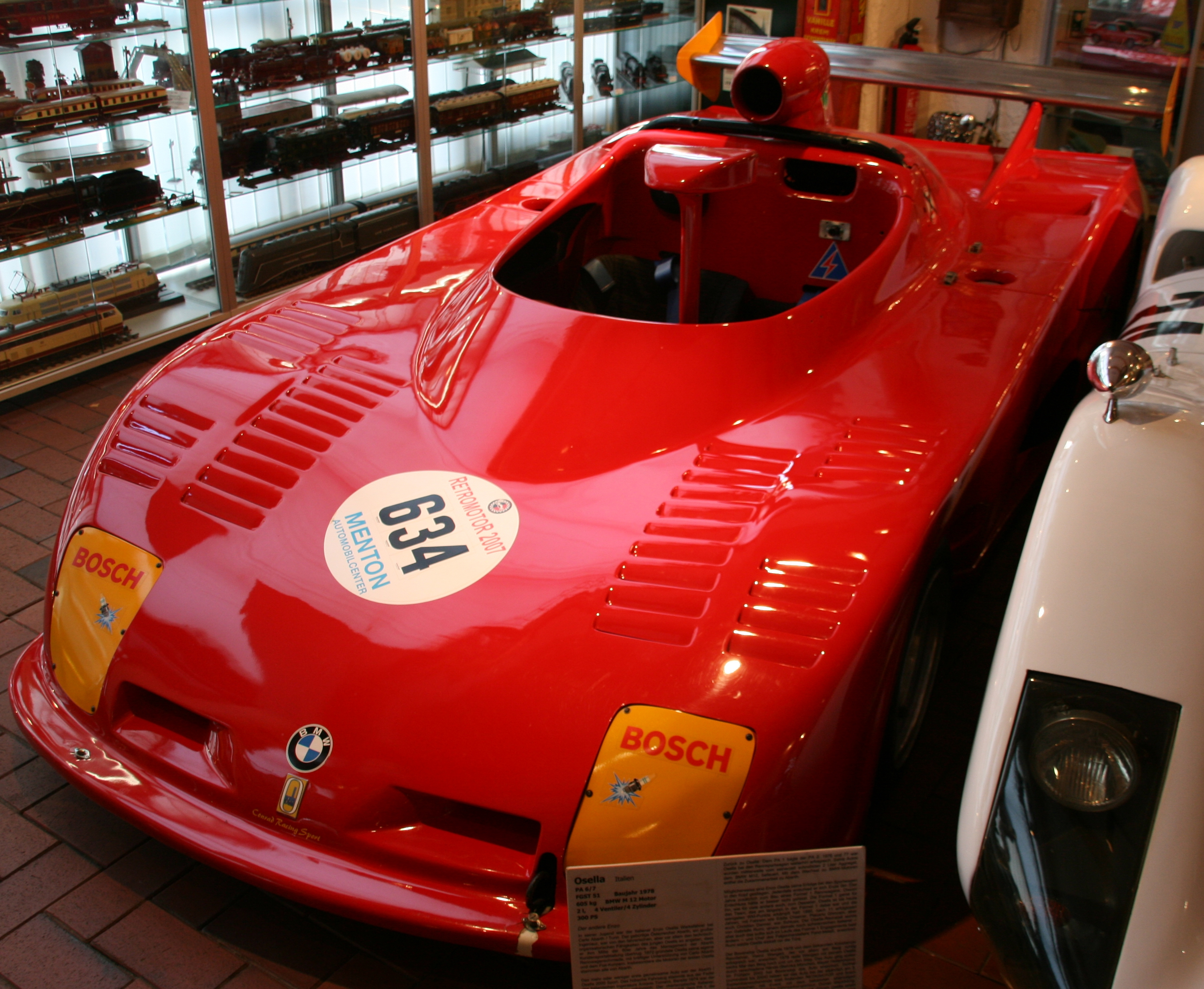
- Category: Group 6 (Sports 2000) prototype
- Designer(s): Osella
- Production: 1978-1982

Technical specifications
- Chassis: Fiberglass aluminum monocoque with steel tubular rear subframe
- Suspension (front): Double wishbones, Coil springs over Dampers, Anti-roll bar
- Suspension (rear): Single top links, twin lower links, Twin Radius arms, Coil springs over Dampers, Anti-roll bar
- Engine: BMW M12/7 turbo Cosworth BDG (PA6 only); Cosworth FVA (PA6 only) inline-four cylinder, 1,598–2,000 cc (97.5–122.0 cu in)
- Transmission: Hewland F.G.400 5-speed manual, rear wheel drive

Competition history
Entries	Wins	Podiums
175	20	47

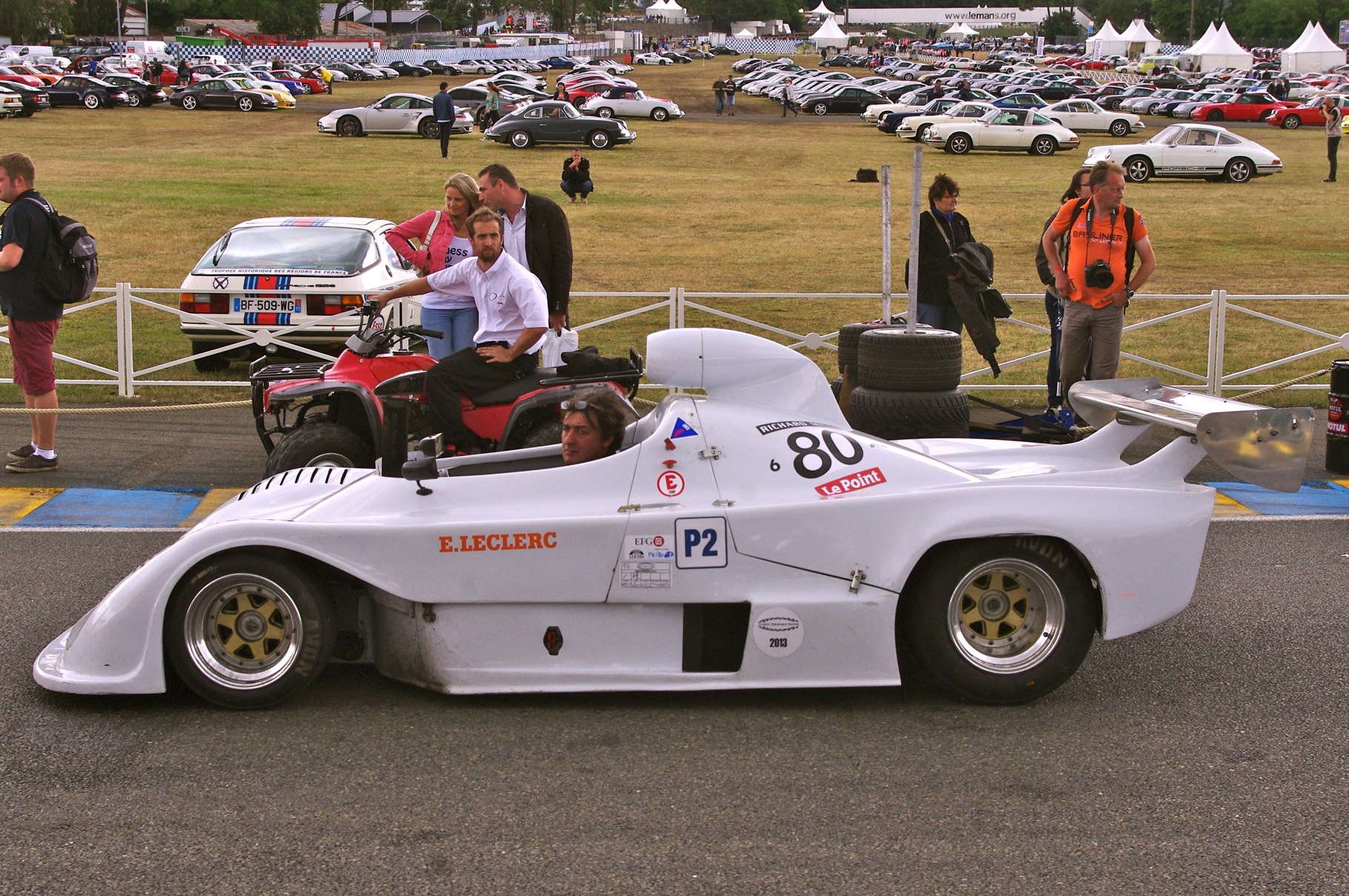
1978 Osella BMW PA6

The Osella PA6 and Osella PA7 are Group 6 (Sports 2000) prototype racing car designed, developed, and built by Osella, to compete in the World Sportscar Championship sports car racing series between 1978 and 1982. It was powered by a number of different engines, including the 2.0 L (120 cu in) BMW M12/7 and the Cosworth BDG, and the 1.6 L (98 cu in) Cosworth FVA was also used. After retiring from sports car racing, these cars later competed in hillclimb racing.

== Development ==
Osella has been active as a producer of racing sports cars since the early 1970s. The first of these prototypes was the PA3, which appeared in 1974. The PA7 was the fifth model in the series of developments. The car had an unladen weight of 710 kg, which corresponded to the minimum weight for sports cars with a displacement of up to 2 liters at the time of the regulations. The engines used were 2-litre, 4-cylinder engines from BMW, which were originally developed for single-seaters in Formula 2 racing. With an output of around 165 hp or 225 kW, the PA7s were up to 320 km/h fast.

== Racing history ==
In sports car races (except Hillclimb events), 62 entries were made for a PA7 in 32 races, and 114 entries were made for a PA6 in 49 events. The PA7 achieved 7 overall wins and 8 class victories. 17 podium finishes were achieved. The PA6 achieved 13 overall wins and 9 class victories. 30 podium finishes were achieved. This is a cumulative total of 20 wins, 17 class victories, and 47 total podium finishes between both cars.

== PA6 ==
=== 1978 ===
The PA6 achieved its first win/victory at the 1978 300 km Nürburgring. This was the first of 13 victories for the PA6 chassis. It would go on to achieve 12 more victories over the next 4 years, with its last victory coming in the hand of Ruedi Caprez at Hockenheim in 1982.

== PA7 ==
=== 1979 ===
When developing the PA7, Osella didn't just think about factory inserts of this type. The PA7 was built almost exclusively for customer use and many chassis were therefore sold to private drivers and private teams. One of the first chassis (079) went to the Italian racing driver Carlo Franchi, who started with it in the Italian Group 6 championship. However, the PA7 made its racing debut at the 1979 Mugello 6 Hours, an endurance race that counted for the World Sportscar Championship. Franchi contested the race together with Gianfranco Palazzoli (pseudonym Pal Joe) and finished in eighth place overall. That was second place in the class for 2-liter vehicles. The victory went to the brand colleagues Giorgio Francia and Lella Lombardi, who drove an Osella PA6.

The PA7's first race win is historic for Osella, marking the team's first of three overall victories in a World Sportscar Championship race. Lella Lombardi and Enrico Grimaldi won the 1979 Pergusa 6 Hours by a margin of 15 seconds over the Lancia Beta Montecarlo of Riccardo Patrese and Carlo Facetti.

=== 1980 to 1986 ===
In the years that followed, PA7s were mainly driven at national Italian sports car races and hill climbs. In 1980, Eugenio Renna (pseudonym Amphicar ) won the Group 6 race in Pergusa and a year later Gabriele Ciuti won this race. In 1984 and 1985 Herbert Stenger finished second overall in the racing cars in the European Hill Climb Championship with a PA7.
