= Giorgio Francia =

Italian racing driver (born 1947)

- Born: 8 November 1947 (age 79); Bologna, Italy

Formula One World Championship career
- Active years: 1977, 1981
- Team(s): Brabham, Osella
- Entries: 2 (0 starts)
- Championships: 0
- Wins: 0
- Podiums: 0
- Career points: 0
- Pole positions: 0
- Fastest laps: 0
- First entry: 1977 Italian Grand Prix
- Last entry: 1981 Spanish Grand Prix

Giorgio Francia (born 8 November 1947) is a former racing driver from Italy. He was the Polifac Formel 3 Trophy Champion in 1974 and the Monza Rally Show Winner in 1994.

Francia unsuccessfully entered two Formula One Grands Prix. The first was in a works Brabham BT45B, in Martini Racing colours, at the 1977 Italian Grand Prix. He was withdrawn during practice. His second attempt was with Osella at the 1981 Spanish Grand Prix, where he was the slowest in practice and failed to qualify.

Francia raced in many categories and competed in sports car racing and touring cars until the late 1990s, driving a works Osella sports prototype in endurance racing in the late 1970s and early 1980s, and also taking part in the factory Alfa Romeo team in the CIVT (Italian Superturismo) and the DTM.

== Complete Formula One results ==
(key)

Year	Entrant	Chassis	Engine	1	2	3	4	5	6	7	8	9	10	11	12	13	14	15	16	17	WDC	Points
1977	Martini Racing	Brabham BT45B	Alfa Romeo Flat-12	ARG	BRA	RSA	USW	ESP	MON	BEL	SWE	FRA	GBR	GER	AUT	NED	ITA; DNQ	USA	CAN	JPN	NC	0
1981	Osella Squadra Corse	Osella FA1B	Cosworth V8	USW	BRA	ARG	SMR	BEL	MON	ESP; DNQ	FRA	GBR	GER	AUT	NED	ITA	CAN	CPL			NC	0

Sporting positions
Preceded by None	Polifac Formel 3 Trophy champion 1974	Succeeded by None
