= John Hogan (motorsport executive) =

Australian Formula One advertising executive

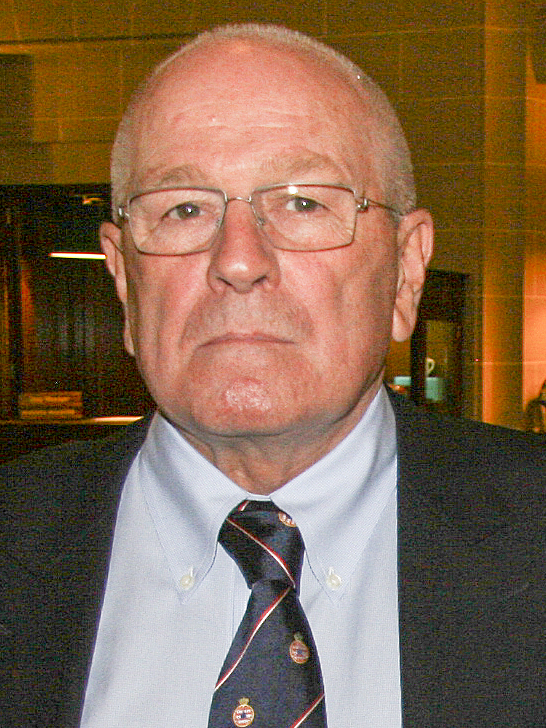
- Hogan in 2013
- Born: John Scott Hogan; 5 May 1943; Sydney, Australia
- Died: 3 January 2021 (aged 77); Verbier, Switzerland
- Occupations: Advertising and motorsport executive
- Years active: 1973–2003
- Spouse: Anne Couchman (m. 1966)
- Children: 2

John Scott Hogan (5 May 1943 – 3 January 2021; nicknamed "Hogie") was an Australian advertising and motorsport executive who led Marlboro's Formula One sponsorship program from 1973 to 2002. As the chief financial backer of McLaren Racing and, subsequently, Scuderia Ferrari, he helped grow Formula One into a global competition with nine-figure team budgets.

Hogan's influence in Formula One stretched across four decades. Hogan subsidised the early careers of several F1 superstars, including James Hunt, Gilles Villeneuve, Nelson Piquet, Alain Prost, Ayrton Senna, and Mika Häkkinen. He spearheaded McLaren's rise to prominence in the 1970s under Emerson Fittipaldi and Hunt, as well as its resurgence in the 1980s under Ron Dennis, Niki Lauda, Prost, and Senna. He bankrolled Michael Schumacher's dominant Ferrari teams at the turn of the 21st century. He also briefly served as sporting and commercial director of the Jaguar Formula One team.

== Early life and family ==
Hogan was born in Sydney on 5 May 1943, to Justin, an Australian Army officer, and Enid Hogan (née Kirkham). The family moved around Asia several times for Justin's various postings.

Hogan developed an interest in auto racing at a young age after watching racing movies and reading an Autocar article about Stirling Moss. While attending the English boarding school Cannock House, he became friends with classmate Malcolm McDowell, who also liked auto racing. Hogan and McDowell visited Aintree to watch Moss win the 1957 British Grand Prix.

After graduation, Hogan moved to London and entered the advertising business, (Note: Italian publication La Gazzetta dello Sport said Hogan also graduated from the University of Cambridge. Autosport said Hogan met Piers Courage while he was in London studying for the Cambridge entrance exams.) working for Nestlé and then various independent advertising agencies. In the early 1970s, he made an early foray into motorsport with Erwin Wasey, arranging for its client Coca-Cola to fund junior drivers.

== Marlboro in Formula One ==
In 1973, Hogan joined the Lausanne, Switzerland, office of Marlboro manufacturer Philip Morris (PM). When he joined PM, Marlboro had recently begun advertising in Formula One. Marlboro's masculine brand image, personified by the "Marlboro Man" advertising campaign, meshed well with Formula One, which had a similarly macho reputation at the time. Under Hogan, Marlboro became "by far the dominant sponsorship presence in F1", and its name became "synonymous with motor racing". As early as 1975, Marlboro's annual Formula One sponsorship budget was $1 million, at a time when the highest-paid drivers were paid $250,000.

=== Finding the advertising loophole ===
When Hogie first entered the paddock as a young advertising executive, Formula 1 was little more than a festival for motor racing anoraks, held mainly on a few European racetracks, and was rarely on television screens; when he left the sport he loved, it was a global television event with grands prix from Brazil to Bahrain and Austria to Austin, Texas.

— McLaren Racing's obituary for Hogan

Hogan was not the first advertising executive to link tobacco with Formula One. In 1968, the Fédération Internationale de l'Automobile (FIA) lifted its ban on corporate sponsorship unrelated to the auto industry, prompting John Love to rename his racing team after the Gunston cigarette brand in time for the season opener at Kyalami. By the next race, Colin Chapman's Team Lotus signed Imperial Tobacco (the manufacturer of Gold Leaf and John Player Special) as its title sponsor, entrenching the practice in the sport. Formula One was not a particularly large-scale enterprise at the time, and Imperial's payment of less than £100,000 covered most of Lotus' costs that year.

However, Hogan helped forge a link between tobacco and Formula One's growing presence on television. He said that while Imperial Tobacco was "a British company and happy to be at the British GP ... [Marlboro] wanted to be global." European governments began outlawing tobacco television commercials in the late 1960s. In response, Marlboro paid racing teams to put its corporate decals on F1 cars' racing liveries. Because the broadcaster of an auto race could hardly show the race without showing the cars, this strategy allowed tobacco companies to get their brands on television without violating the ban on purchasing ad time. Hogan later explained that he saw Formula One as a way to advertise on television "before the black curtain came down" and regulators introduced more stringent measures against tobacco advertising. In the analogous context of IndyCar, during the 1989 Marlboro Grand Prix, it was calculated that Marlboro's name was spoken or shown 5,933 times in 94 minutes, and that Marlboro's name was on television for 46 of those minutes.

Other tobacco companies followed PM and Imperial's lead, "driv[ing] Formula One into an era where big-name corporate sponsors were essential to fund technological advances and soaring salaries". In 2005, journalist Dieter Rencken found that every World Drivers' Champion since 1984 had been sponsored by a tobacco company. The clout of major advertisers Marlboro and Elf (a petrol company) was so great that the two sponsors helped play peacemaker during the FISA–FOCA war. With sponsorships on both sides of the conflict (Marlboro was the title sponsor for both the FOCA-affiliated McLaren and the FISA-affiliated Alfa Romeo in the early 1980s), Marlboro took "an inevitable neutral line", but Hogan pushed the parties to reach a compromise.

By the end of the 20th century, European regulators began cracking down more harshly on cigarette advertising. France adopted a law restricting tobacco marketing at sporting events (the loi Évin) in 1991, and other European countries eventually passed similar laws. Formula One Group chief Bernie Ecclestone lobbied the British government for help, telling Tony Blair that no other industry would match tobacco's financial commitment to the sport. In 1997, Blair asked European authorities to exempt F1 from tobacco advertising restrictions. Although his attempt to secure a permanent exemption was unsuccessful, Europe granted F1 an extended grace period "to allow recipients of tobacco cash to find other forms of funding." In addition, some European countries, like Italy, imposed only nominal fines for tobacco advertising. They were rewarded with multiple races per year.

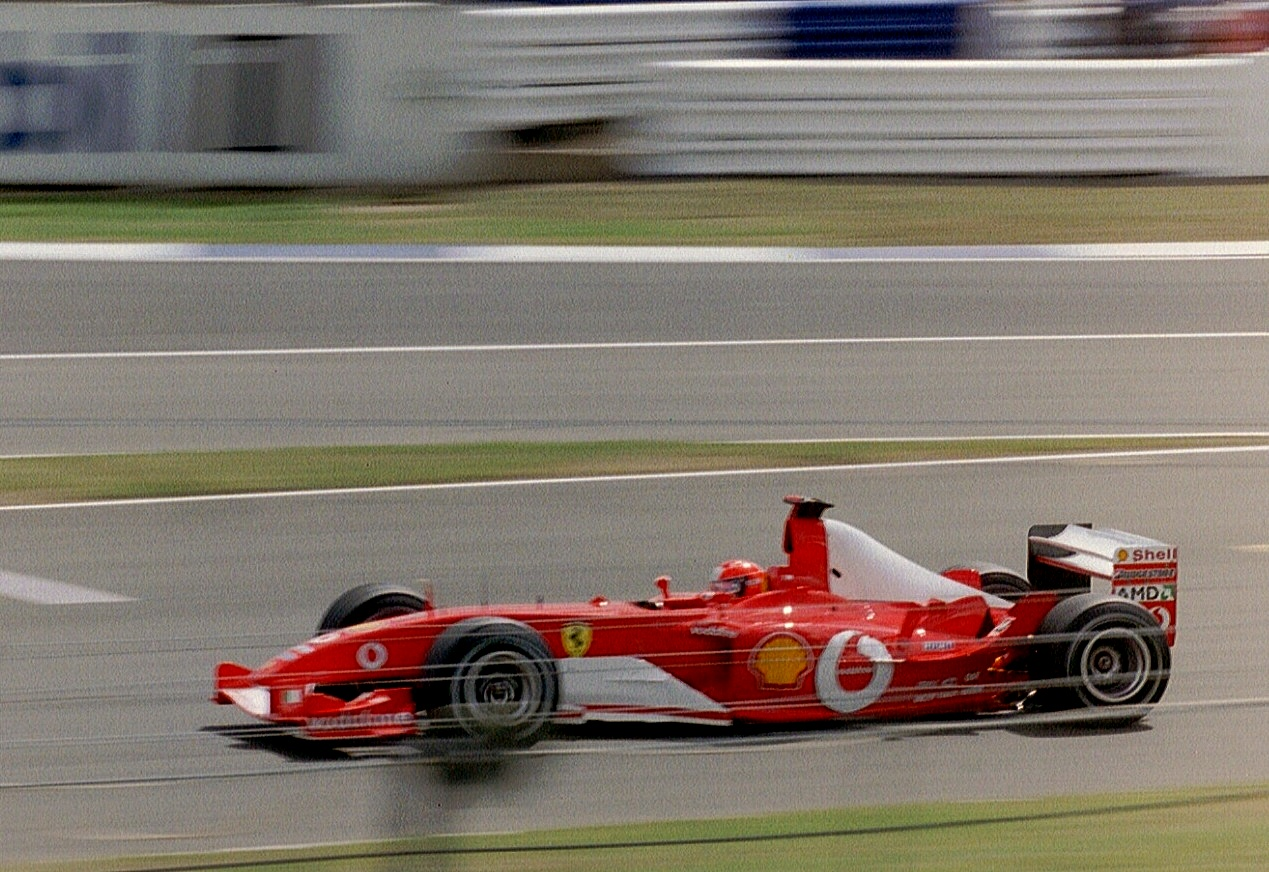
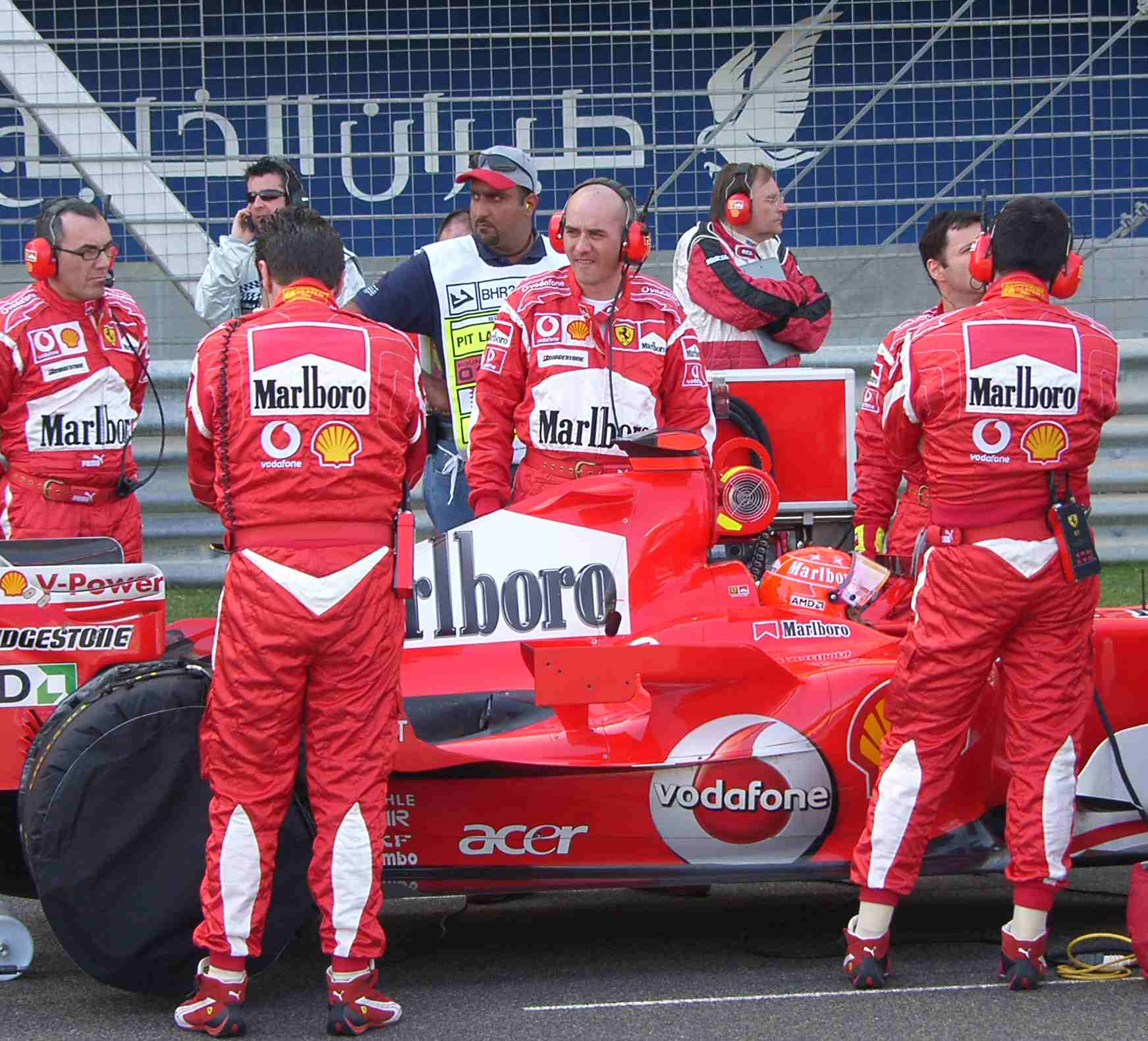
To avoid European restrictions on cigarette advertising, which required F1 teams to blank out tobacco decals on their liveries, cigarette brands like Marlboro encouraged Formula One to race in new markets like Bahrain. (Left: Photo of Michael Schumacher's Ferrari at the 2003 British Grand Prix. Right: Photo of the Ferrari team during the 2006 Bahrain Grand Prix.)

In response, the tobacco industry engineered Formula One's emergence as a global competition. Although European regulators could prevent tobacco advertising decals in races in Europe, races in countries where tobacco decals were legal could still be shown on European television. F1 added many non-European circuits to the race calendar, and "threatened to move [the sport] to Asia if the [1997 European tobacco advertising] ban was imposed immediately." FIA president Max Mosley said that tobacco companies funded this shift by bankrolling new circuits in the Far East.

Hogan also worked with Ecclestone to market Formula One around the world; he was credited with the invention of grid girls. In addition, he was chosen to represent F1's sponsors on the FIA's F1 Commission, which wrote the rules for the sport.

=== Drivers as marketing sensations ===
Hogan is perhaps best known for his patronage of James Hunt, the 1976 Formula One World Champion. He got to know Hunt before joining Marlboro, having subsidised Hunt's junior career during his years at Erwin Wasey. The 28-year-old Hogan cobbled together $2,000 (£820, or £10,424 in 2025 pounds) from Coca-Cola and Rose Bearings so that Hunt could compete in the 1971 British Formula Three season. Hogan recalled that the payment was "a fortune in those days." The two men became good friends. Although Hogan found Hunt's personality frustrating to deal with as a businessman, Hunt was a heavy smoker with a glamorous lifestyle, making him an ideal pitchman for the Marlboro brand.

Hogan was credited with steering Hunt to the Marlboro McLaren team, where he achieved his greatest successes. Fittipaldi abruptly left the team before the 1976 season. The two contenders for his race seat were Hunt and Jacky Ickx. Although McLaren's other sponsor Texaco wanted Ickx, team manager Alastair Caldwell said that Hogan essentially "forced" Hunt into the team. However, Hogan's true role in recruiting Hunt is unclear. He told Hunt's biographer that Ickx "was past his peak" and that he had wanted Hunt all along. However, in 2018, he said that he had wanted to sign Ickx, and that other decisionmakers at McLaren chose Hunt. (Note: In Hogan's words: "The options were James Hunt or Jacky Ickx. I never told James this, but I voted for Jacky Ickx. [Laughter.] So in the end, we went with James, and I had the task of going and finding James." [After being asked why he preferred Ickx] "It wasn't any reservation about James. It was just I knew Ickx was a very good driver.") In any event, Hogan drove a hard bargain with Hunt, offering him an incentive-based contract with a guaranteed salary of just $50,000, one-fifth of what McLaren had been paying Fittipaldi. By contrast, Hogan offered Wolf-Williams Racing up to £100,000 to sign Ickx for 1976.

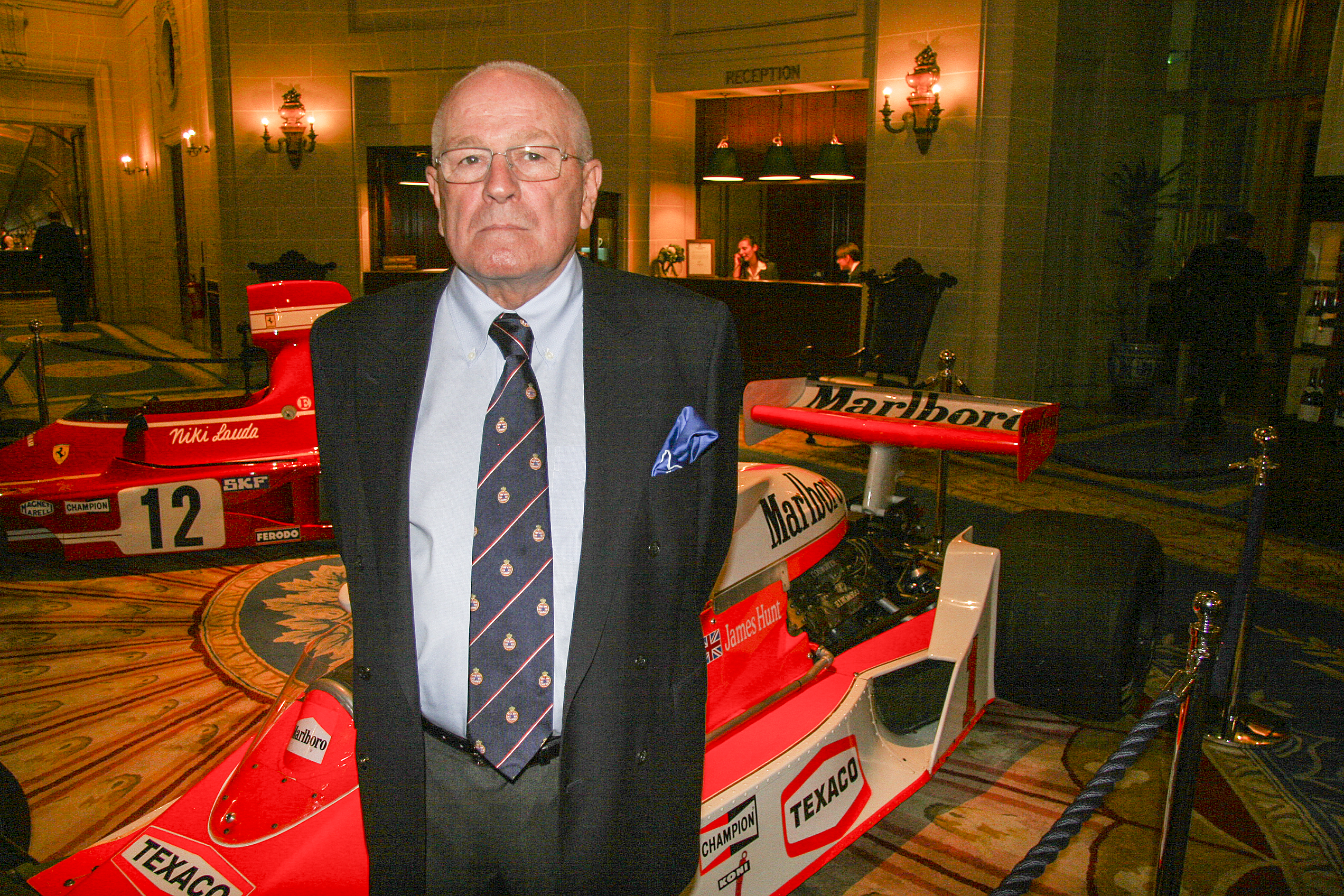
Hogan standing in front of James Hunt and Niki Lauda's cars at a promotional event for the film Rush (2013)

The two friends did not always see eye to eye as businessmen. Hunt refused to give up smoking Rothmans cigarettes, although he agreed to pretend to smoke Marlboros. In addition, Hunt declined Hogan's request to wear a jacket and tie at sponsor events, and angered Hogan by secretly signing another sponsorship deal with Olympus. Despite these tics in the relationship, Hogan foresaw that Hunt could establish a fierce rivalry with Ferrari's Niki Lauda, who was also sponsored by Marlboro. He told his bosses that Hunt could generate "a good story—the Brit against the German." (Note: Lauda was Austrian but the quote is otherwise accurate.)

After joining McLaren, Hunt immediately took the fight to Lauda, generating major exposure for Marlboro. The two drivers battled for the 1976 title until the end of the season. Hunt was so popular that the British Broadcasting Corporation—which had been refusing to show the sport on television due to a dispute about Formula One advertising practices—caved in and covered the final race of the season. When Hunt won the 1976 title, Hogan paid for a long string of parties, sponsor events, and press interviews. Marlboro's European sales increased significantly after Hunt's victory. The publicity value from the title race was estimated at as much as $500 million.

=== Creating the modern-day superheroes ===
Although Hunt never won another title, Hogan continued finding and sponsoring championship drivers. To maximise Marlboro's exposure on television, he hired ad men who "deliberately attempted to elevate the principal drivers from mere heroes to superhero status". Autoweek's Joe Saward wrote that Hogan, Bernie Ecclestone, and Elf's François Guiter were "the primary forces in creating modern F1, not only by providing money for the sport, but also by putting together great teams".

Under Hogan, PM set up the Marlboro World Championship Team, a predecessor of the modern-day driver academy, to provide financial support to promising junior drivers. After Hunt retired, Hogan hired him as an advisor and driver coach. Many of the best Marlboro-sponsored drivers got their starts at McLaren, which was Marlboro's flagship team for most of Hogan's career.

- In 1977, Hogan gave Gilles Villeneuve his Formula One debut with McLaren after receiving a glowing recommendation from James Hunt.
- In 1978, Hogan gave Brazilian rookie Nelson Piquet (a three-time champion) three races in a privateer McLaren M23, which, reportedly, convinced McLaren's Teddy Mayer to give Piquet a full-time McLaren drive for 1979. However, Piquet reneged on the deal to join Brabham, for which Hogan never forgave him. Piquet later complained that Marlboro wanted its drivers to attend sponsorship events with "people who don't understand racing."
- In 1980, Hogan arranged for Alain Prost (a four-time champion) to debut with McLaren. Mayer initially preferred Kevin Cogan, but relented and signed the Frenchman after an excellent performance in testing.
- In 1984, Hogan secured an option to sign Marlboro junior driver Ayrton Senna (a three-time champion) to the McLaren senior team, as part of a $10,000 junior driver sponsorship contract. However, McLaren opted for a Prost–Lauda pairing for 1984.
- In 1993, Hogan and Hunt successfully advocated for McLaren to sign Marlboro junior Mika Häkkinen (a two-time champion), who was coming off two somewhat disappointing years at Lotus.

Moreover, in at least one case, Marlboro placed a driver with McLaren because of the driver's personal ties to the tobacco industry: Philip Morris' leadership favoured Andrea de Cesaris, whose father was a PM distributor. However, de Cesaris spent only one season (1981) with McLaren. Marlboro also sponsored Alfa Romeo from 1980 to 1983, which overlapped with the years when de Cesaris drove for the team (1980, 1982, 1983).

=== Outside Formula One ===
During the Hogan years, Marlboro's sponsorship work extended beyond Formula One. In Hogan's native Australia, Marlboro backed Peter Brock and the Holden Dealer Team, as well as Nissan Motorsport, Glenn Seton Racing, and Stone Brothers Racing. In the United States, Hogan encouraged McLaren to start an IndyCar team in the mid-1980s, but John Barnard scuppered the deal because the IndyCar and Formula One chassis regulations were too different. Ultimately, Marlboro sponsored Team Penske's open-wheel driving operations until the late 2000s. At the end of the 1992 F1 season, Hogan arranged for Ayrton Senna to test a Penske IndyCar at Firebird Raceway.

== McLaren (1974–1996) ==
One of Hogan's first moves at Marlboro was to end its sponsorship of venerable British Racing Motors, whose days he felt were numbered. The company had already begun sponsoring Frank Williams Racing Cars (FWRC), the predecessor of the more well-known Williams Racing. As part of the arrangement, the FWRC were renamed "Iso-Marlboro" for the 1973 season. However, the Iso-Marlboro was unsuccessful, prompting Hogan to look elsewhere.

=== Teddy Mayer era ===
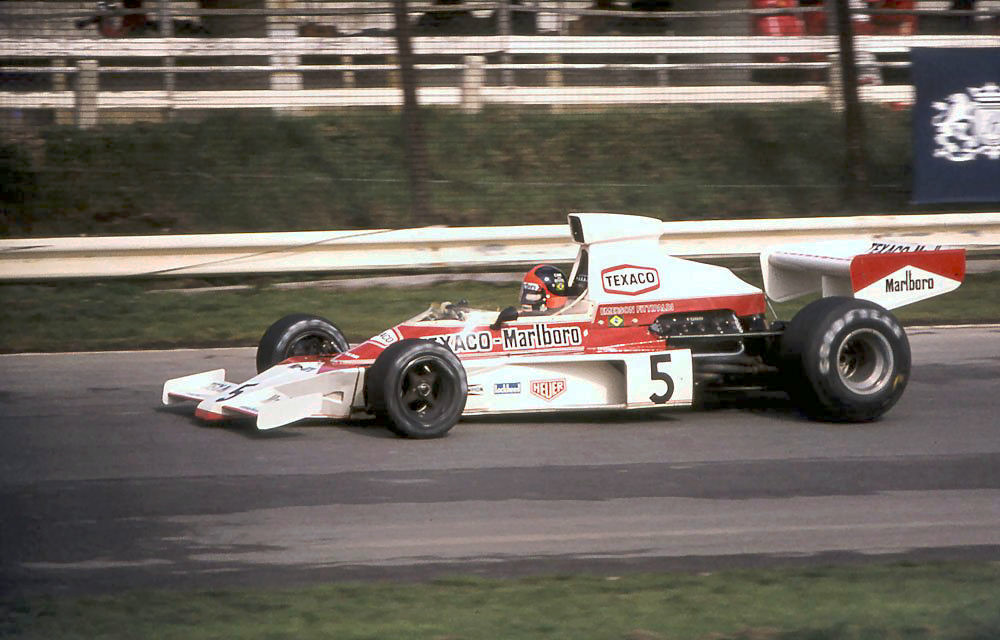
Emerson Fittipaldi driving his Marlboro-branded McLaren M23 at the 1974 British Grand Prix. Fittipaldi and McLaren won double world championships that season.

Ahead of the 1974 season, Hogan approached 1972 champion and free agent Emerson Fittipaldi with a deal, offering to sponsor Fittipaldi and pay his salary at the team of his choice. Fittipaldi met with Brabham, Tyrrell, and McLaren. Brabham and Tyrrell drivers had won five of the last seven Drivers' Championships. (Note: 1967 (Jack Brabham), 1968 (Denny Hulme), 1969, 1971, 1973 (Jackie Stewart)) By contrast, the McLaren team was a relative upstart. Started in 1970, its best season placement to that point was third in 1972 and 1973. Even so, Fittipaldi chose McLaren.

Aided by Fittipaldi's talent and Marlboro money, McLaren won its first Drivers' and Constructors' Championships in 1974. Marlboro sponsored McLaren from 1974 to 1996. During this period, the team won nine Drivers' Championships and seven Constructors' Championships.

Marlboro's scouting network funneled promising juniors to McLaren, which occasionally caused tensions with team principal Teddy Mayer. In 1977, Mayer released Gilles Villeneuve to Ferrari in the middle of his rookie season, over Hogan's objections, although in that case Hogan's Marlboro superiors supported the decision as they wanted a driver from France (Villeneuve was French Canadian) for marketing reasons. In 1980, Hogan decided to back Alain Prost, resolving to put him in the team even if Mayer disagreed. However, Prost had a falling-out with Mayer and left McLaren after his rookie year.

The team also fell behind technologically. Team Lotus outpaced McLaren during the ground effect revolution of the late 1970s. A frustrated Hogan considered switching Marlboro to a different team for 1980. In 1980, Hogan lured away Lotus star Mario Andretti and gave him a choice between McLaren and Alfa Romeo for 1981. Andretti chose Alfa Romeo over McLaren.

=== Ron Dennis era ===
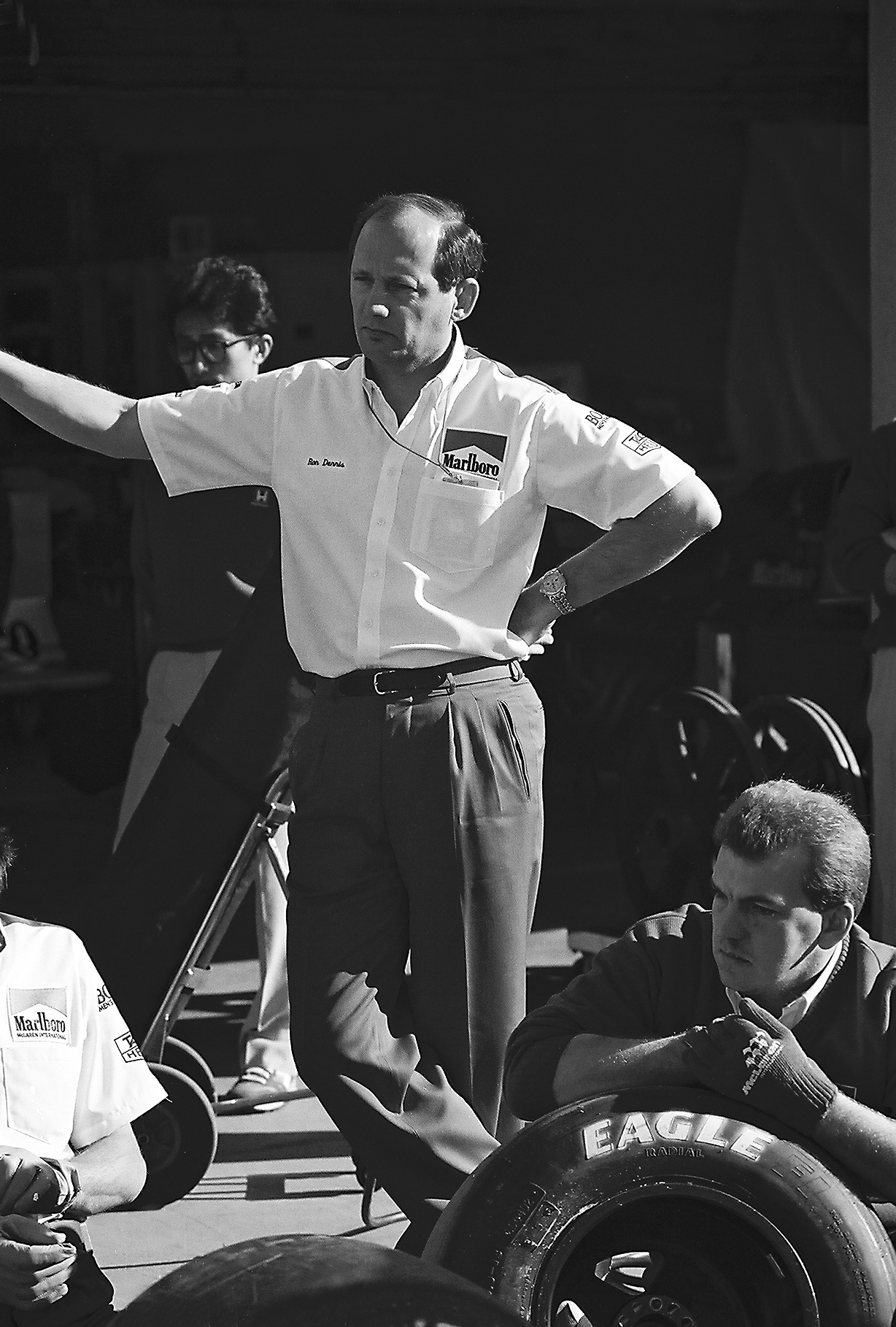
Hogan brought Ron Dennis to McLaren in 1981.

In 1981, Hogan arranged for Ron Dennis to join, and eventually replace, Teddy Mayer. Hogan and Dennis had known each other for nearly a decade, as Dennis had previously retained Hogan's ad agency to find sponsors for his Rondel Racing Formula Two team. Dennis led the team to seven constructors' titles and ten drivers' titles, all but four (1998 (2), 1999, 2008) with Marlboro. Due to Dennis' successes at McLaren, team CEO Zak Brown (a former protege of Hogan) said that Hogan is "probably as responsible as anyone at McLaren [for it] being where it is today".

Financed by Marlboro money, Dennis and John Barnard introduced the revolutionary carbon-fibre monocoque chassis to Formula One. At the time, the McLaren MP4/1 was considered "the most advanced and expensive race car in the world". (Depending on who was asked, the MP4 was short for either "Marlboro Project Four" or "McLaren Project Four".)

With Hunt's help, Hogan continued to attract elite drivers during the Dennis era. He arranged for Niki Lauda to return from retirement in 1982 (after James Hunt persuaded him to sponsor Lauda's comeback) and brokered Prost's return to McLaren for 1984, sealing a driver pairing that won two Drivers' Championships and two Constructors' Championships. He helped welcome Ayrton Senna to McLaren in 1988; Senna's competition for the seat was Nelson Piquet, against whom Hogan harbored a long-running grudge. After Senna proceeded to win three Drivers' Championships with McLaren, Hogan's Marlboro paid Senna $1 million per race in 1993, uncommonly high for its day.

Marlboro's grip on the team began to weaken in the late 1980s, when auto manufacturers (who could outspend even tobacco companies if motivated to do so) began to assert dominance over the sport. Honda Racing F1 joined McLaren in 1988 and was soon contributing three times as much money to the team as Marlboro. Following Honda's exit, McLaren eventually partnered with Mercedes, but Hogan grew disillusioned with the combination, explaining that Mercedes was "nowhere near ready" and that he expected "years of pain" before the team became competitive again. After an executive decision by Hogan, Marlboro stopped funding McLaren after the 1996 season. However, two years later, Ron Dennis and Mika Häkkinen (a formerly Marlboro-sponsored junior driver) led McLaren-Mercedes to a double world championship in 1998. Häkkinen also defended his Driver’s Championship in 1999.

== Ferrari (1982–2002) ==
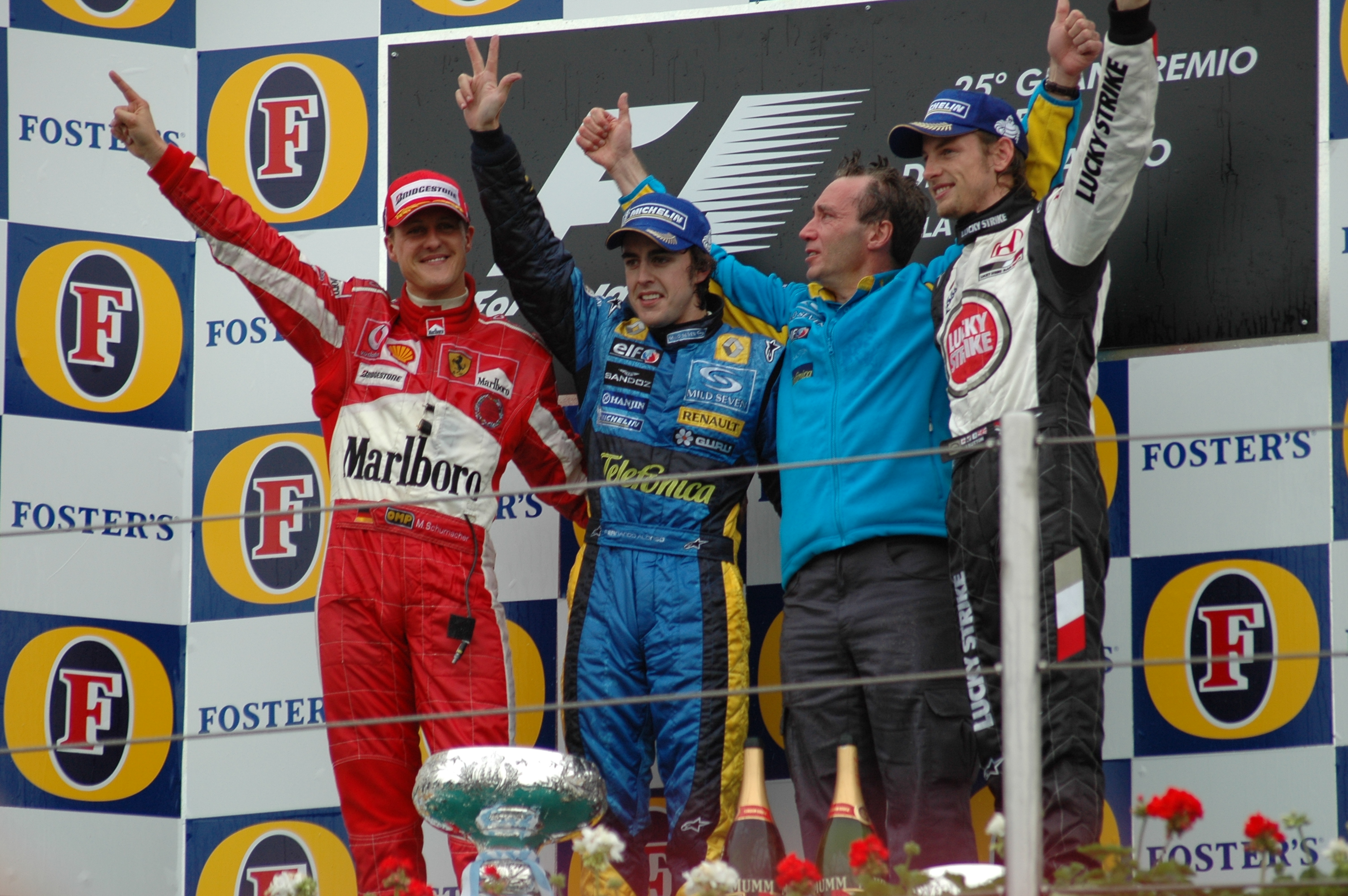
At the 2005 San Marino Grand Prix, podium finishers Michael Schumacher (left), Fernando Alonso (second from left), and Jenson Button (right) were all sponsored by tobacco brands.

Over the years, Hogan cultivated a relationship with Italian automaker Ferrari and its racing team, Scuderia Ferrari. He was attracted to Ferrari's large and devoted fanbase, explaining that "Ferrari is the only team you can go to and have a bad year." However, Enzo Ferrari was historically sceptical of advertising, and would not sell Marlboro ad space on his cars. Nevertheless, some Ferrari drivers, like Niki Lauda, supplemented their salaries with Marlboro personal sponsorship contracts. During Hogan's years with McLaren, the British team released Gilles Villeneuve during the Canadian's rookie year. Hogan arranged for Villeneuve to join Ferrari in 1978. Villeneuve eventually became a personal favourite of Enzo Ferrari, who allowed Villeneuve to lease out ad space on his race suit—thereby giving Marlboro a visual connection to the Ferrari brand.

As the costs of running a Formula One team spiraled upwards in the 1980s, Ferrari grew more open to tobacco money. In 1982, Hogan brokered a Ferrari sponsorship deal, which was "the first time [Ferrari] had agreed to sponsorship from a non-motor industry source". Ferrari's change of heart was prompted, in part, by Hogan's own work at McLaren, as Ron Dennis believed that "the only way to [dominate the sport] was to out-spend Ferrari". Although Ferrari initially limited the amount of ad space Hogan could buy, Marlboro eventually acquired prominent advertising spaces on the Ferrari chassis.

In 1996, Hogan brokered Michael Schumacher's move from Benetton (whose title sponsor was Marlboro rival Mild Seven) to Ferrari. Marlboro paid much of Schumacher's $25 million salary, which was the highest in the history of the sport. (It was rumored that Hogan had offered Schumacher even more money to join McLaren, but the German chose Ferrari instead.) The following year, Marlboro left McLaren and became Ferrari's title sponsor. It spent as much as £70m/year on the Italian team; one writer commented that "so vast were its resources it would come to effectively supplant Fiat as the race team's parent". A 2004 study found that Marlboro paid over a quarter of Ferrari's $336.2 million budget and that its annual expenditures on Ferrari exceeded backmarker Minardi's entire budget. The then-struggling Ferrari team went on to win eight Constructors' Championships in ten years from 1999 to 2008.

Hogan retired from Marlboro in 2002. Although Ferrari was still F1's dominant team, the sport was phasing out tobacco advertising. In 1997, the European Commission announced a ban on tobacco advertising in sports starting in 2006, by which point only three teams had cigarette companies as their title sponsors.

== Post-Marlboro career ==
=== Jaguar (2003) ===
After a year working as an advisor for Vodafone, Hogan joined Jaguar Racing for the 2003 season. That year, the team abolished the position of team principal and split the duties between Hogan (sporting and commercial director) and David Pitchforth (managing director).

At Jaguar, Hogan signed up-and-coming driver Mark Webber to replace Eddie Irvine, confirming one of Niki Lauda's final decisions as team principal. However, the team failed to improve on the prior year's seventh-place finish, and Hogan left within a year. Jaguar's parent company Ford sold the team to Red Bull a year later. After leaving Jaguar, Hogan expressed dismay that Ford wanted to run the team "on £150m a season".

=== Zak Brown ===
After leaving Jaguar, Hogan joined Zak Brown's marketing company Just Marketing International, later acquired by Chime Sports Marketing. Hogan introduced Brown to Formula One figures like Bernie Ecclestone, Luca di Montezemolo, Flavio Briatore, and Frank Williams. Brown called Hogan "the king of Formula One sponsorship". He said that "I didn’t think I had that much street cred [among Formula One decisionmakers] … until John took me."

Brown joined McLaren in 2017 and became its CEO in 2018. After Hogan's death, Brown said that Hogan was the man "who made the biggest impact for me in Formula One," explaining that he could not have gotten the McLaren job without Hogan's early mentorship.

== Personal life ==
Hogan married Annie Couchman in 1966. They had two children, Andrew and Ally. In 2003, The Guardian incorrectly reported that Hogan's brother was Crocodile Dundee actor Paul Hogan. On 3 January 2021, Hogan died from complications of COVID-19 in a hospital near Verbier, Switzerland.

Hogan was portrayed by Patrick Baladi in Ron Howard's Rush (2013), a film about the Hunt–Lauda rivalry. In the film, Hogan warns James Hunt that sponsors prefer Jacky Ickx, but Hunt persuades the McLaren leadership to give him a chance. A 2011 draft of the script included a scene where Hogan calls Niki Lauda and gloats that Hunt wanted to beat Lauda so badly, "he'd have taken [the job] for nothing!"

== Sources ==
- Henry, Alan (1996). Ferrari: The Battle for Revival. Sparkford, UK: Patrick Stephens Ltd. ISBN 978-1-85260-552-0.
- Henry, Alan (1990). The Turbo Years. Swindon, UK: Crowood Press. ISBN 978-1-85223-397-6.
- Rubython, Tom (2010). Shunt: The Story of James Hunt. London, UK: Myrtle. ISBN 978-0-9565656-0-0.
