= François Guiter =

French Formula One advertising executive (1928–2014)

- Guiter in 2009
- Born: François Émile Jean Guiter; 7 May 1928; Paris, France (VII^{e})
- Died: 9 November 2014 (aged 86); Paris, France (XV^{e})
- Occupation: Advertising executive
- Years active: 1967–1989
- Employer: Elf Aquitaine
- Spouse: Françoise (Grandidier)
- Children: 3

François Émile Jean Guiter (7 May 1928 — 9 November 2014) was a French businessman who served as Elf's head of marketing from 1967 to 1989. Through his control over the French state-owned oil company's marketing budget, he became one of Formula One's most important power brokers. Joe Saward of Autoweek described Guiter as one of "the primary forces in creating modern F1".

Guiter facilitated Formula One's path to broadcast television, winning a struggle with the BBC to permit large-scale advertising in the sport. He was the chief financial backer of Matra, Tyrrell, and Renault, the first two of which won titles while being sponsored by Elf. He championed Renault's introduction of turbocharged engines to Formula One in 1977, ushering in a new era of racing dominated by wealthy multinational automakers. Although Renault disbanded its Formula One works team in 1985, Elf helped persuade the company to resume building engines in 1989. Renault-powered Williams and Benetton won five Drivers' Championships and six Constructors' Championships in the 1990s.

Through Elf, Guiter pursued Charles de Gaulle and Georges Pompidou's goal to restore the reputation of French auto racing. Jackie Stewart won three Drivers' Championships in cars sponsored by Elf and painted in French racing blue. Led by Stewart, Équipe Matra won the Constructors' Championship in 1969; as of the 2024 season, it is the only constructor physically headquartered outside the United Kingdom or Italy to win the title. Through his involvement in the French junior racing pyramid, Guiter supported the junior careers of many future Formula One drivers, including four-time world champion Alain Prost. He also backed the Alpine-Renault endurance racing team, which won the 1978 24 Hours of Le Mans.

== Early life ==
Guiter was born in the 7th arrondissement of Paris, France, on 7 May 1928. His parents were Jean Guiter, a politician, and Odette Formigé, the daughter of architect Jules Formigé.

During World War II, a young Guiter joined the French Resistance. He worked as a frogman. He was missing several fingers, and the rumor in the racing press was that he lost the fingers while attaching a limpet mine to an enemy ship. He later studied architecture, but found it boring and quit after two years. He also spent time with the SDECE, France's secret service. Many years later, he would call on his secret service connections to have François Cevert's body promptly transported back to France after Cevert died in 1973.

After leaving the secret service, Guiter joined the film industry, producing several underwater films with Jacques Cousteau and Haroun Tazieff. In the 1960s, he worked on several episodes of the French television show Les Coulisses de l'exploit. However, in 1955, his brother Jean-Claude was killed during a television shoot with Tazieff. He got lost exploring a dangerous water-filled underground cavern at Font Estramar. Guiter dived to find him, and Cousteau dispatched his own team to continue the search, but neither attempt succeeded. After Jean-Claude's body was found in 1958, the cavern was sealed at Guiter's request.

To appease his parents, Guiter left underwater filmmaking for advertising, joining the French office of American oil company Caltex. After his arrival, the French government nationalised Caltex's French operations.

== Motorsports et la grandeur ==
In 1965, the French government merged Guiter's Caltex and several other companies into one large state-owned oil company, ERAP, which rebranded to Elf in April 1967. Guiter was named Elf's head of marketing. He searched for a way to promote his company's new name. Although Guiter admitted that he "had never watched a race before and knew nothing about [the sport]", market research convinced him that Elf's relatively young and urbanized customer base wanted to buy cutting-edge products and were interested in auto racing. In response, the company adopted the slogan "Elf looks at things from a different angle" (Elf voit les choses d'une autre façon). Guiter went into auto racing, emphasizing that technical innovation "must be at the heart of our image", and "we will prove it ... with our involvement in motorsport".

Guiter and Elf enjoyed the support of Charles de Gaulle, the president of France at the time. The Gaullist philosophy of de Gaulle and his successor, Georges Pompidou, encouraged France to grow self-reliant. Elf was located in the strategically valuable oil sector, and thus became "an instrument of the national independence and the grandeur of France", in contrast to Renault, the state-owned auto manufacturer. Elf used its political favor to influence Renault corporate policy. Elf also intertwined its operations with those of Renault's, each using its position to promote the other's products.

De Gaulle also wanted to restore the reputation of French auto racing. It was said that while "de Gaulle saw only a grand design for France" in auto racing, Pompidou actually liked cars. Guiter agreed with the plan, explaining that "we looked at racing ... and we realised the French had been pretty good at it: Delahaye, Delage, Talbot, Gordini, drivers like Wimille and Sommer. But there was nobody left. So, we rather pretentiously said, 'We're going to put France back on top of the racing world.'"

== Formula One sponsorship ==
=== Entering the television era ===
Elf directly advertised through title sponsorships, adding itself to the team names of Tyrrell and Renault. At various points, Elf also supplied race fuel to Matra, Williams, Benetton, Brabham, Lotus, McLaren, and Ligier. Due to Elf's omnipresence in Formula One advertising, Motor Sport wrote that "no matter where you go for a [...] Grand Prix you will be conscious of the name ELF". Recognising the increasing role of sponsors, the Commission Sportive Internationale (auto racing's top regulator) appointed Guiter and Marlboro's John Hogan to the Formula One Commission, which governed the sport.

At this moment, 53 networks televise Formula 1 regularly, and 650 million people watch each race. The BBC's position is just one out of 54.

— Guiter, quoted in Autosport in 1977

To reach this point, however, Guiter had to overcome opposition from the British Broadcasting Corporation, which disfavoured obtrusive advertising. In March 1976, the BBC decided to black out the 1976 Formula One season to protest the Surtees Racing Organisation's sponsorship with condom manufacturer Durex. A month later, it also threatened to black out the Formula Two season, pointing to a 55-square-inch limit on the size of advertising decals on racing cars. In response, Guiter threatened to have Elf produce the race broadcast itself and sell it to the BBC's rival, ITV-LWT. In the end, British audiences demanded to watch local star James Hunt challenge Niki Lauda for the Drivers' Championship at the 1976 Japanese Grand Prix. After ITV agreed to broadcast Formula One, the BBC caved in.

Guiter's struggle with the BBC continued into the 1977 season. The BBC accused Elf of "intransigence" and said that it would refuse to broadcast the season until Elf agreed to shrink its advertising decals from 15 inches to a maximum height of five inches. In response, Guiter filmed the entire Formula One and Formula Two seasons at Elf's expense and offered to give away the footage to the BBC's rivals for free. He also accused the BBC of hypocrisy for broadcasting Hunt's victory at the 1977 British Grand Prix, as Hunt's McLaren car advertised sponsors Marlboro and Texaco. In 1978, the BBC introduced Murray Walker's long-running TV programme Grand Prix to provide consistent coverage of all races, all season long.

Elf also tried to grow the sport. Upon arriving in Formula One, Guiter was unimpressed with the quality of the racing press. He pushed to further professionalise media coverage. Outlets he backed included TF1 television show Automoto and the French edition of Autosport magazine. He paid photojournalists Just Jaeckin and Emmanuel Zurini and film director Alain Boisnard to cover the sport. Working with Bernie Ecclestone, he also encouraged improvements to television coverage, including the introduction of onboard cameras. In addition, he was one of the first sponsors to provide centralized catering for racing journalists at Formula One races.

In his later years, Guiter clashed with Ecclestone and his ally Max Mosley, who wanted to maximise television revenue. His Elf "ma[d]e no bones about the fact that if Mr. Ecclestone and Mr. Mosley want[ed] to turn Formula 1 into a public spectacle and an entertainment above all else, with no thought for the future other than money-making[,] then [it would] pull out". Guiter felt that Formula One should not drive too hard a bargain for television rights, because it was in the sport's interest to keep the cost of broadcasting low and television networks happy. Mosley described Guiter's position as "an extraordinary mistake". He responded that television networks would not take Formula One seriously unless they were paying large amounts of money for it.

=== Matra: France's first champion ===
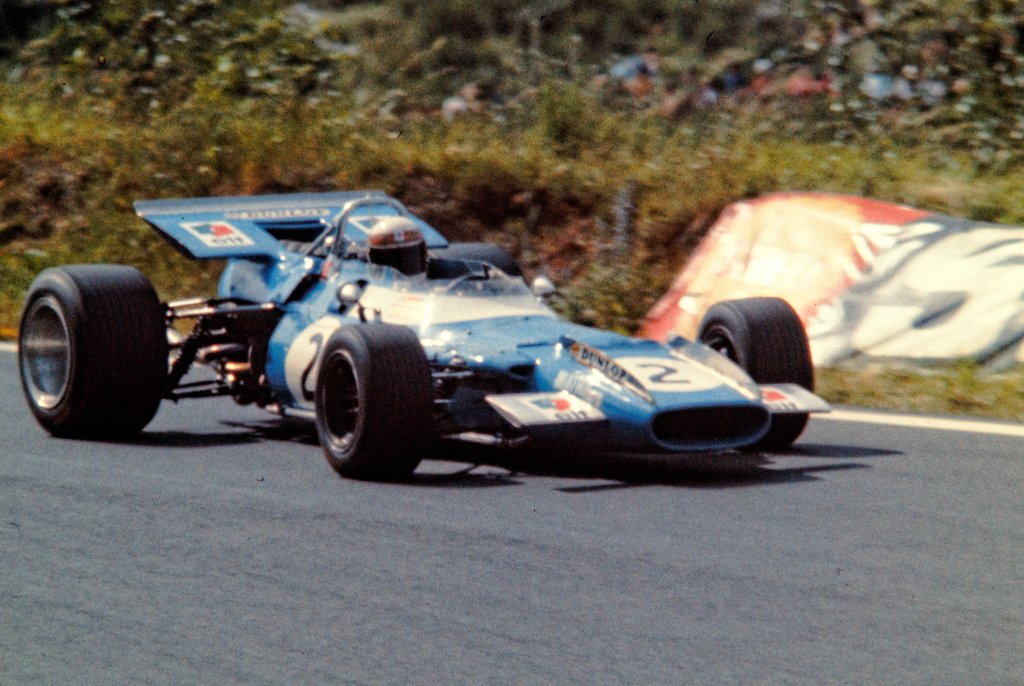
Driving the Matra MS80, Jackie Stewart won the 1969 French Grand Prix on his way to his first title.

Even before launching the Elf brand, Guiter had already signed a four-year sponsorship agreement with Equipe Matra Sports. In addition to Elf's support, the team received 6 million francs in direct funding from the French government. Matra was described as "a means of restoring French pride within the highest echelons of the sport". When the team was still new, Guiter promised that Matra would work its way up from Formula Three to Formula One and then Le Mans. He recalled that when he said it, "everyone just fell about laughing".

At Matra, Guiter formed a triumvirate with team principal Ken Tyrrell and company CEO Jean-Luc Lagardère. In a complicated arrangement, Tyrrell ran his own British team as Matra International, combining a French Matra chassis with Ford engines. The team was technically a privateer and operated separately from the Matra works team, but it received factory support from Matra. Tyrrell praised Matra's commitment, explaining that "the manufacturing methods they use are very expensive. I don't think any of the British Formula One manufacturers could afford to pay what it costs to produce a Matra Formula One".

Matra's Formula One efforts peaked in 1968 and 1969, after the Tyrrell team recruited Jackie Stewart from BRM. Elf paid his £80,000 salary. Guiter praised his work ethic, later calling him "the first real professional driver". In 1968, Stewart finished second in the Drivers' Championship, and Matra-Ford finished third in the Constructors' Championship. However, the Matra works team (which used in-house Matra engines) finished eighth. In 1969, Matra paused its works team, making Tyrrell its sole focus. The new Matra MS80 was the class of the field. Stewart won the first of his three Drivers' Championships in dominant fashion, scoring 63 points to Jacky Ickx's 37, and Matra-Ford won the Constructors' Championship. Matra remains the only chassis constructor with its headquarters outside the United Kingdom or Italy to win the Formula One constructors' title. (Note: The title-winning Renaults of the mid-2000s were built in Enstone, England; its engines were built in Viry-Châtillon, France.)

However, Matra's success was complicated by Elf's close relationship with Renault. Although Renault did not compete with Matra in Formula One, both automakers wanted to win the 24 Hours of Le Mans. According to reporter Jabby Crombac, the Renault-Matra rivalry was so intense that Georges Pompidou personally ordered Elf to stop sponsoring Matra. Guiter added that Renault was also jealous of Matra's success in Formula One. Matra eventually won Le Mans three years in a row (1972, 1973, and 1974), although by that point, Matra had a different fuel sponsor.

=== Tyrrell ===
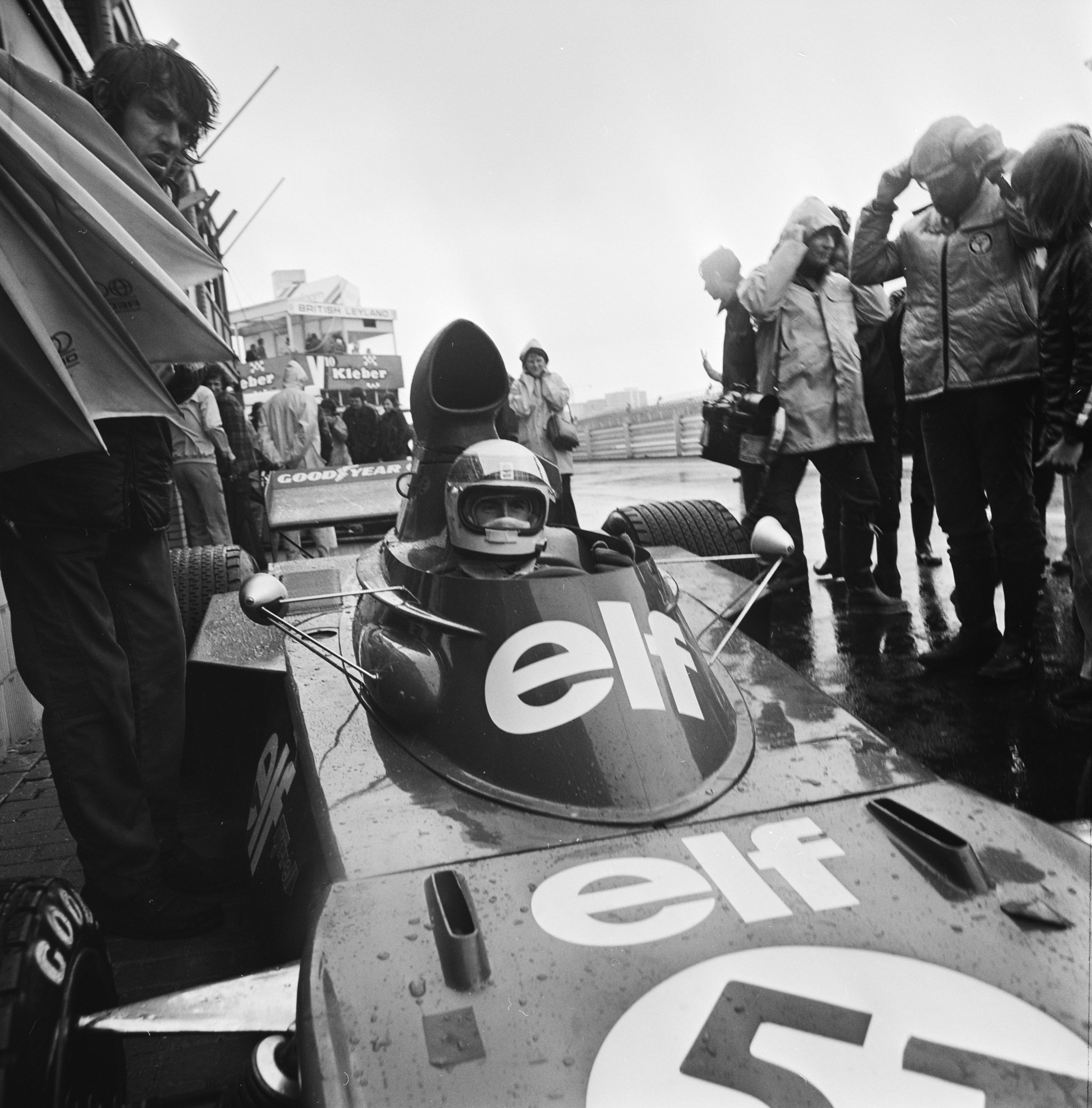
Stewart (pictured at the 1973 Dutch Grand Prix) won his third world title in 1973 with Elf Team Tyrrell. He retired after the season.

Matra split up after the 1969 double world championship. Matra asked Tyrrell to switch from Ford engines to Matra's own engines, which neither Stewart nor Tyrrell wanted to do. As a result, Tyrrell left Matra and started a fully independent racing team, the British Tyrrell Racing Organisation. Guiter threw his support behind Tyrrell, as the Matra parent company had recently partnered with French automaker Simca, which was allied with Elf's rival Shell. Guiter later revealed that Matra considered partnering with Renault instead of Simca, but negotiations with Renault fell through. Matra shifted its focus to endurance racing and shut down its Formula One team after the 1972 season. In 1976, Guy Ligier acquired Matra's racing assets and started his own F1 team, which competed until 1996.

Although Tyrrell Racing was a British team, it retained a certain French flavour. Tyrrell agreed to keep painting his cars French racing blue, and Guiter frequently placed French drivers with the team. Tyrrell initially replaced Matra with a privateer chassis from March, but Elf and Dunlop provided the financial support for Tyrrell to start building his own cars. Guiter's spending on the team rivaled even that of tobacco companies; by the mid-1970s, Tyrrell was spending six times as much money as Team Lotus in 1968, the year Lotus became the first major F1 team to sign a tobacco sponsorship deal. Aided by French money, the Tyrrell team continued to succeed: Jackie Stewart won two more titles with Tyrrell in 1971 and 1973, and Tyrrell won the Constructors' Championship in 1971. After Stewart retired in 1973, Guiter hired him as a company ambassador.

Elf remained with Tyrrell until 1978, but Guiter and Ken Tyrrell clashed over the fate of Renault's turbo engine project, which Elf was subsidising. Guiter admitted that Tyrrell had given him the idea to build a turbo engine in the first place, and that their initial plan was for Renault to build engines for Tyrrell. Guiter said that the notorious 1976/1977 "six-wheeler" Tyrrell P34 was originally designed for a Renault turbo, and Autosport reported on rumours that Tyrrell was planning to install a Renault turbo in 1978's Tyrrell 008, but none of these plans ever came to fruition and Renault started its own works team. Guiter claimed that Tyrrell was scared of "unnamed problems" with the turbo project and "gave up" on Renault. One Tyrrell engineer said that Keith Duckworth (whose Cosworth engine company would have lost Tyrrell as a customer if Guiter’s plan had succeeded) helped sway Tyrrell against turbos. However, by 1984 Motor Sport reported that Renault was affirmatively refusing to supply Tyrrell with turbo engines. Regardless of the reason, Tyrrell eventually campaigned to ban turbos from Formula One, and Elf stopped financially supporting the team.

Tyrrell Racing endured financial difficulties after Elf's departure and never contended for a title again. The team essentially went sponsor-less in 1979; Maurice Hamilton wrote that "Tyrrell had come to rely completely on [sponsorship from Elf and Citibank] without thinking about nurturing sponsorship from anywhere else". Tyrrell was one of the last major F1 teams to acquire turbo engines, when Renault agreed to supply it for 1985. By this time, the Renault works team was already on its way out. After several decades and multiple ownership changes, the Tyrrell outfit returned to title contention as Brawn GP and Mercedes, although neither team sourced its fuel from Elf.

== French talent pipeline ==
According to Joe Saward, Guiter, Formula One Group's Bernie Ecclestone, and Marlboro's John Hogan were "the primary forces in creating modern F1, not only by providing money for the sport, but also by putting together great teams". Guiter poured "vast sums of petro-francs" into building a French driver pipeline. Due to his significant influence, Jean Alesi said that Guiter "was like a king in France". Patrick Tambay said that Guiter and Enzo Ferrari were the only two people he met who demonstrated "absolute natural authority".

Guiter significantly increased France's presence in Formula One. In the 1970s and 1980s, 29 French drivers raced in Formula One. At the high-water-mark of the French phenomenon, the 1980 South African Grand Prix, seven of the 26 drivers who qualified to start were French. Autosport's French editor Pascal Dro—whose publication was supported by Elf—wrote that "all the French racing drivers who won in Formula 1 since the late 1960s owe their career to [Guiter]". On the other hand, Matt Bishop called Guiter's efforts "nakedly jingoistic".

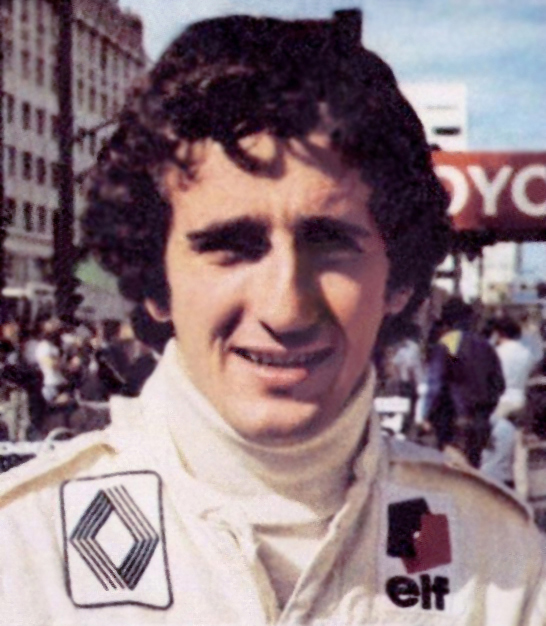
Alain Prost (pictured with Equipe Renault Elf in 1981) raced for the Écurie Elf junior team before becoming France's only Formula One World Drivers' Champion.

Guiter championed various driver development initiatives, including:

- Formula France (later Formula Renault): Elf sponsored the junior series from its introduction in 1967.
- The Winfield Racing School: Winfield maintained two junior driver academies at Magny-Cours and Paul Ricard. Its best graduates were awarded Elf sponsorship contracts that provided financial backing for advanced junior series. As many as 30 Winfield graduates became Formula One drivers.
- Volant Elf: The winner of this junior competition for young drivers received a fully funded season in Formula Renault. As such, the competition "quickly became the fast route for hopefuls to reach F1".
- Formula Three: At a time when Formula Three was "wasting away because it was prohibitively expensive to run", Guiter commissioned a new Formula Three engine for junior drivers to use.
- Women in motorsport: Guiter sponsored the Ecurie Elf Ladies' Team, which competed in endurance racing events. Lella Lombardi and Marie-Claude Charmasson raced for an Elf team at the 1975 24 Hours of Le Mans.

Guiter did more than write checks. Winfield School's Simon de Lautour said that Guiter "would go up to people in the F1 pits and say: 'I want you to try this driver' - and they'd jump to it. He had a lot of charisma and a lot of clout." Drivers aided by Guiter included François Cevert, Patrick Depailler, and Didier Pironi. He had a particularly warm relationship with Depailler. Guiter also stepped in to fund Rene Arnoux's junior career when Arnoux's prior benefactor, Shell, cut its funding during the 1973 oil crisis.

The most famous beneficiary of Guiter's support was Alain Prost, France's only Formula One World Champion, who credited Guiter with helping him "at a time when I was stuck". Prost, whose family could not afford to pay for a year in Formula Renault, saved his junior career by winning the Volant Elf. After Prost won the French Formula Three Championship in 1978, Guiter "took a personal interest" in the young man. He took him to the 1979 Monaco Grand Prix and introduced him to the racing press, telling Nigel Roebuck that "this one is special". He encouraged John Hogan—the power broker at McLaren—to give the young Prost a chance. Although McLaren team boss Teddy Mayer favored a different driver, Hogan helped persuade Mayer to let Prost spend his rookie year with McLaren. Prost later said that Guiter "opened the doors of F1 to me". Upon Guiter's death, he added that "French Formula 1 owes him a lot. I owe him everything."

Despite his staunch support for Formula One, Guiter was ambivalent about the junior program, citing the sport's unimpressive safety record at the time he began sponsoring the sport. He said that "when Elf started competing ... many people died in accidents. I felt that I was sending all of these boys to disaster. It was not consistent with what I used to do."

== The first Renault F1 team ==
=== The Alpine-Renault-Elf alliance ===
During Guiter's career, Renault—France's leading state-owned automaker—traditionally resisted the costs of auto racing. Its CEO, Pierre Dreyfus, said that "Renault is not a manufacturer of race cars and it will not become one". In the 1950s and 1960s, Dreyfus allowed Automobiles Alpine to borrow the Renault name and to enter Renault Dauphines in motorsport competitions. However, Renault provided no financial support, and the joke was that the Alpine team was branded "Renault-Alpine" when it won and "Alpine-Renault" when it lost. In addition, during the 1960s and 1970s, Renault grew suspicious of Alpine's financial management, as Alpine was deep in debt. Renault ultimately purchased majority control of Alpine in 1973 and full control in 1977.

At the end of 1967, Guiter approached Renault's communication director Jean Terramorsi with a proposal to start auto racing. In an arrangement that went beyond motorsports, Elf agreed to financially support the Renault-Alpine racing teams in exchange for various commercial concessions. In auto racing, Alpine provided the chassis, Renault and its subsidiary Gordini generally provided the engine, and Elf provided the money. Elf contributed 110 million francs (around £8.7m in 1972, or £101m in 2024) to the Alpine-Renault-Elf teams before the Renault takeover in 1973.

Over the next decade, Guiter overcame Renault's resistance to auto racing by bankrolling Renault teams in less expensive competitions until Renault finally agreed to join Formula One during the 1977 season. Because of his key role in Renault's racing operation, it was said that when the Renault F1 team had a bad day, Guiter and not Renault would "receive [the] phone calls from very high up in the French Government asking what [was] going on". Jean-Pierre Jabouille said that "if Guiter had never existed, Renault F1 would have never existed".

=== A decade of trying ===
At the start of the Alpine-Renault-Elf alliance, Elf encouraged Alpine to compete in multiple categories. The Alpine-Renault-Elf team, led by Jean-Claude Andruet, won the 1968 French rally championship. The team also entered the 1968 24 Hours of Le Mans, although it failed to win the general classification and only won a lesser category. In addition, while Renault did not want to fund a Formula One team, Guiter helped Alpine build a prototype race car for the 1968 Formula One season, the Alpine A350.

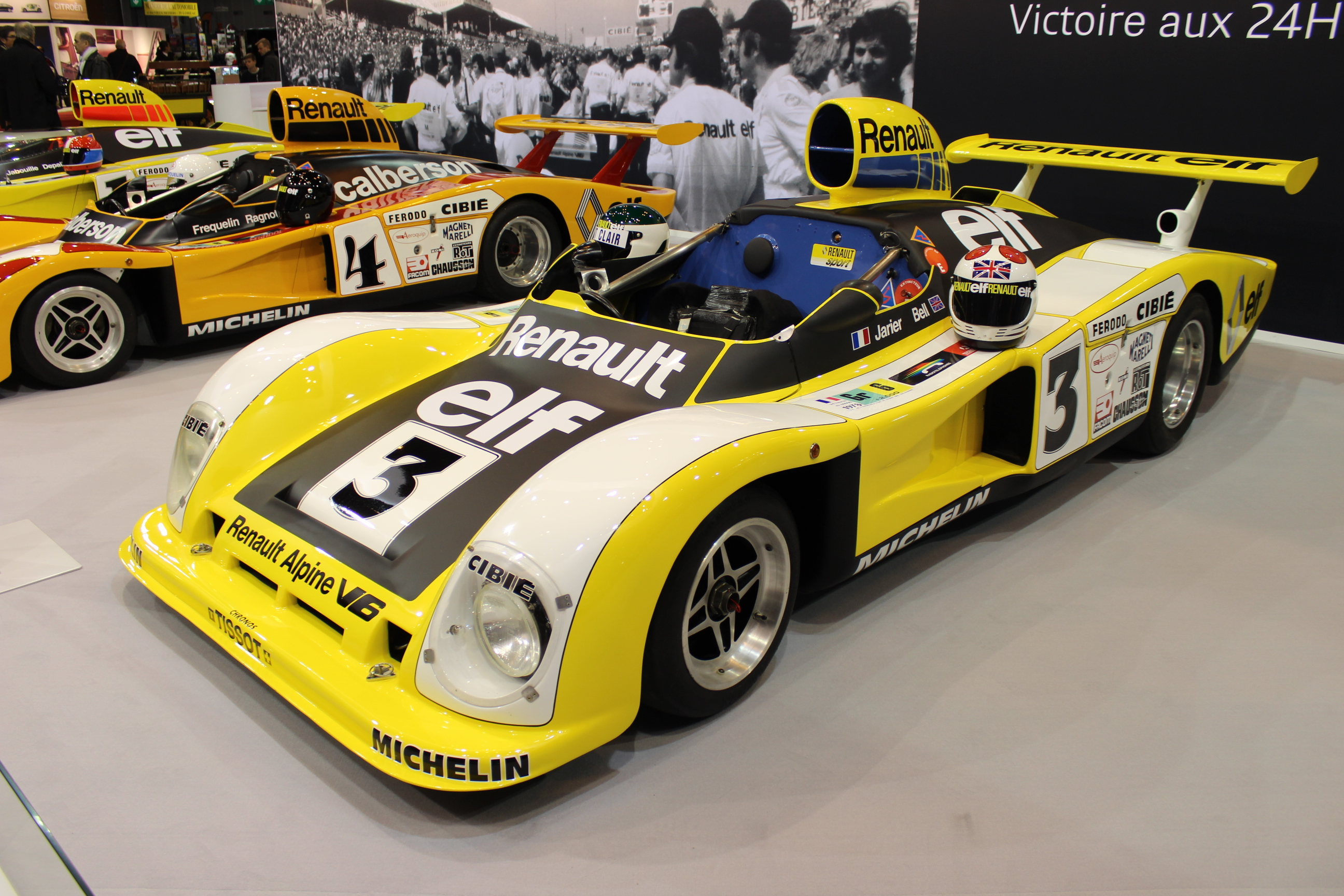
The Renault-Alpine team won the 1978 24 Hours of Le Mans with the turbo-powered Alpine A442B.

Renault soon reduced the alliance to rallying. Renault was relatively comfortable with rallying, which used stock cars. By contrast, Renault withdrew support for endurance racing after another disappointing Le Mans in 1969. In addition, Renault shut down the Formula One project before its first race, arguing that the project would not be competitive. Alpine kept the prototype in storage, but Renault had it destroyed after taking over Alpine in 1973. Guiter recalled that "at the time, it was almost forbidden to talk about [Formula One] with Renault".

However, Guiter did not give up. In 1972, he commissioned Renault subsidiary Gordini to build a new engine for a revival of the Alpine endurance racing team. Although Renault's leadership was not enthusiastic, Guiter "simply handed the budget to a new generation of engineers at Gordini's Viry-Châtillon factory and told them to get on with it". The team won the 1974 European Sportscar Championship, sweeping the top three places in the standings, and Alain Serpaggi won the Drivers' Championship in an Alpine A441. For its next step, Renault built a turbocharged sportscar engine, which debuted at Mugello in 1975. The Alpine A442 debuted at the 1976 24 Hours of Le Mans, setting the fastest lap. In 1978, Alpine won Le Mans for the first time. However, Renault left endurance racing after the 1978 victory to focus on Formula One.

Guiter also pressed on in formula racing. After the Tyrrell-Matra split, Elf began sponsoring an Alpine French Formula Three team, which won the 1971 title. Alpine progressed to Formula Two for the 1972 season, but Renault declined to develop a new engine, so Alpine purchased customer Ford-Hart engines, which were less successful.

=== Bringing turbos to Formula One ===
It has been a long project.

— Guiter after Renault won its first Grand Prix

In mid-1975, Bernard Vernier-Palliez succeeded the traditionalist Pierre Dreyfus as Renault's CEO. That same year, Renault centralised and formalised its racing operations (including Alpine and Gordini) under one banner, Renault Sport. Two years after destroying the Alpine A350, Renault authorised Alpine to design a new car, the Alpine A500, which eventually developed into the Renault RS01, the team's first Formula One car. Renault eventually agreed to join Formula One for the 1977 season. Elf signed a ten-year contract with Renault to become the team's title sponsor.

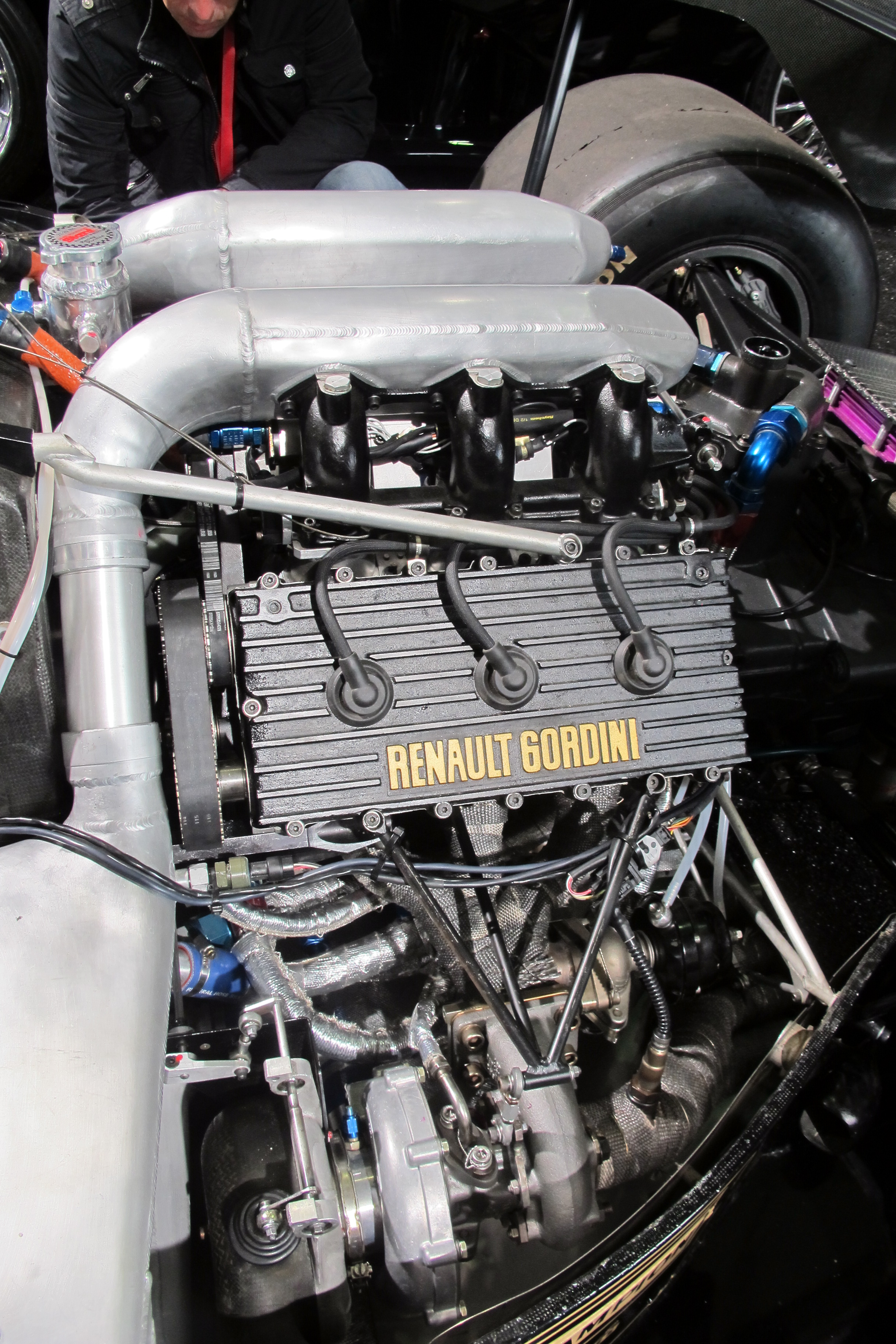
The mighty (if unreliable) Renault EF-Type engine introduced turbocharger technology to Formula One.

The most important decision facing the new team was whether to develop a naturally aspirated engine or a turbocharged engine. Formula One regulations permitted either option, but to that point, every team had picked the tried-and-true NA engines over the untested turbos. Guiter strongly supported the turbo project, as Elf felt that "something so different would make great marketing sense". In addition, Ken Tyrrell had advised him that it would be easier to invent something new than to out-develop the dominant, naturally aspirated Ford Cosworth engines. To sway Renault leadership, Guiter promised that Elf would pay for two engines itself.

When Renault joined the grid, it became the first Formula One team to use a turbocharged engine. Guiter estimated that the Renault turbos generated 500 horsepower, 50 more than Cosworth.

The engines' increased power was offset by decreased reliability, and Renault endured two difficult seasons in 1977 and 1978. The jilted Ken Tyrrell cuttingly dubbed the Renault "the yellow teapot" because of how frequently it retired with smoke bursting from the engine. Engine chief Bernard Dudot explained that Renault had not predicted how difficult it would be to perfect the new turbo technology, but pointed out that it was "because we didn't have a complete view of the problems ... [that] we were able to convince the president of the company that this was the way". However, his team continued improving the engine, and two years after Renault entered Formula One, Renault's Jean-Pierre Jabouille won the 1979 French Grand Prix. Guiter was finally able to celebrate what Autosport called "victory in France for a French driver, with a French chassis, engine, tyres, fuel. French everything." Looking back, Niki Lauda called Renault's win "the real beginning of the turbo era."

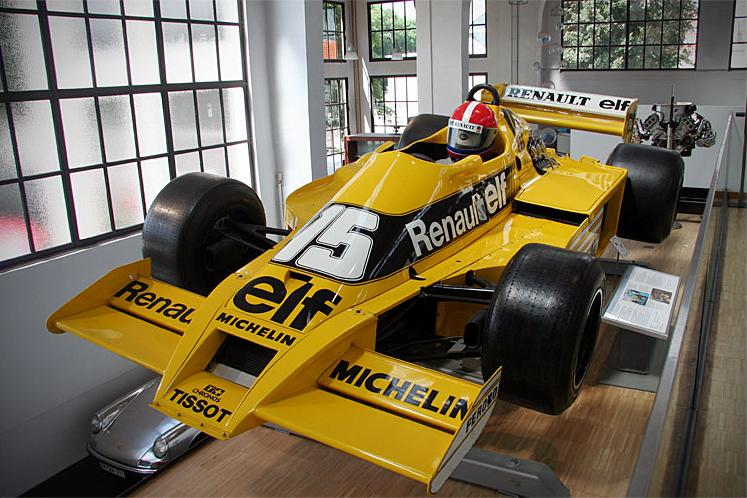
In 1977, Renault joined Formula One with the Renault RS01.

The power of the Renault turbos eventually shifted the balance of power in Formula One from small, mostly British racing teams to large automakers who could afford to develop complex engines. The British teams initially sought to ban or limit turbos. By contrast, Ferrari adopted turbochargers in 1981. The more powerful British teams eventually relented and found their own large automakers to build turbo engines for them, with Honda joining Williams, Porsche joining McLaren, and BMW joining Brabham. By 1983, every major team was using turbo engines. The turbo dispute overlapped with the FISA-FOCA war, when the teams representing auto manufacturers split with FOCA (which represented most of the British teams) over various issues related to the governance of the sport. Elf followed Renault and sided with FISA. Guiter warned FOCA to compromise before FISA cancelled the 1980 season, which eventually went ahead.

=== 1983 title controversy and decline ===
By 1980, Renault was competing at the top of Formula One. It finished 4th, 3rd, 3rd, and 2nd in the Constructors' Championship from 1980 to 1983. In 1983, Alain Prost narrowly lost the drivers' title to Brabham-BMW's Nelson Piquet. Post-race testing determined that Piquet's fuel (supplied by Elf's rival Wintershall) had an octane rating of 102.9, slightly above the limit of 102. Guiter wanted to challenge the result; through unknown means, he had acquired one of the fuel samples that Brabham had submitted to the regulators, and Elf independently confirmed the findings. However, FISA's Jean-Marie Balestre ruled in Piquet's favour, costing his countryman Prost the title. One writer characterised Balestre's decision as an attempt "to underline the new entente cordiale" between FISA and FOCA.

Renault declined to appeal the ruling. Various reasons were provided. Prost opined that Renault did not care because it had already decided to fire him at the end of the season, while Guiter felt that Renault's corporate leadership did not want to offend BMW. Others said that Renault was uncomfortable with the idea of winning a title in the courtroom. After Prost was fired and joined McLaren, the British team invited Elf to stay with Prost as a McLaren sponsor, but Guiter's superiors blocked the move in deference to Renault.

The 1970s-1980s incarnation of Renault never competed for a title again. Its results slid after Prost was fired. In addition, in early 1985, the French government replaced Renault CEO Bernard Hanon, a supporter of the team, with Georges Besse, who was not as enthusiastic about the project. Renault shut down its Formula One team after the 1985 season. In addition, it stopped manufacturing engines for other teams after the 1986 season, Besse having given Renault Sport an ultimatum to sign a works engine deal with McLaren, Lotus, or Williams or quit. Renault did not resume constructing cars until 2000, when it acquired Benetton Formula (renamed Renault in 2001).

== Final successes with Williams and Benetton ==
Following Renault's exit, Guiter kept Elf in Formula One. He initially backed Peter Warr's Lotus-Honda team, which employed French engineer Gérard Ducarouge and Brazilian driver Ayrton Senna. He proposed following Senna and Honda to McLaren in 1988, which would have also allowed him to reunite with Alain Prost. However, after some bureaucratic infighting within the Elf organisation, Elf renewed its contract with Lotus and McLaren remained with Shell.

=== Prost and Williams-Renault ===
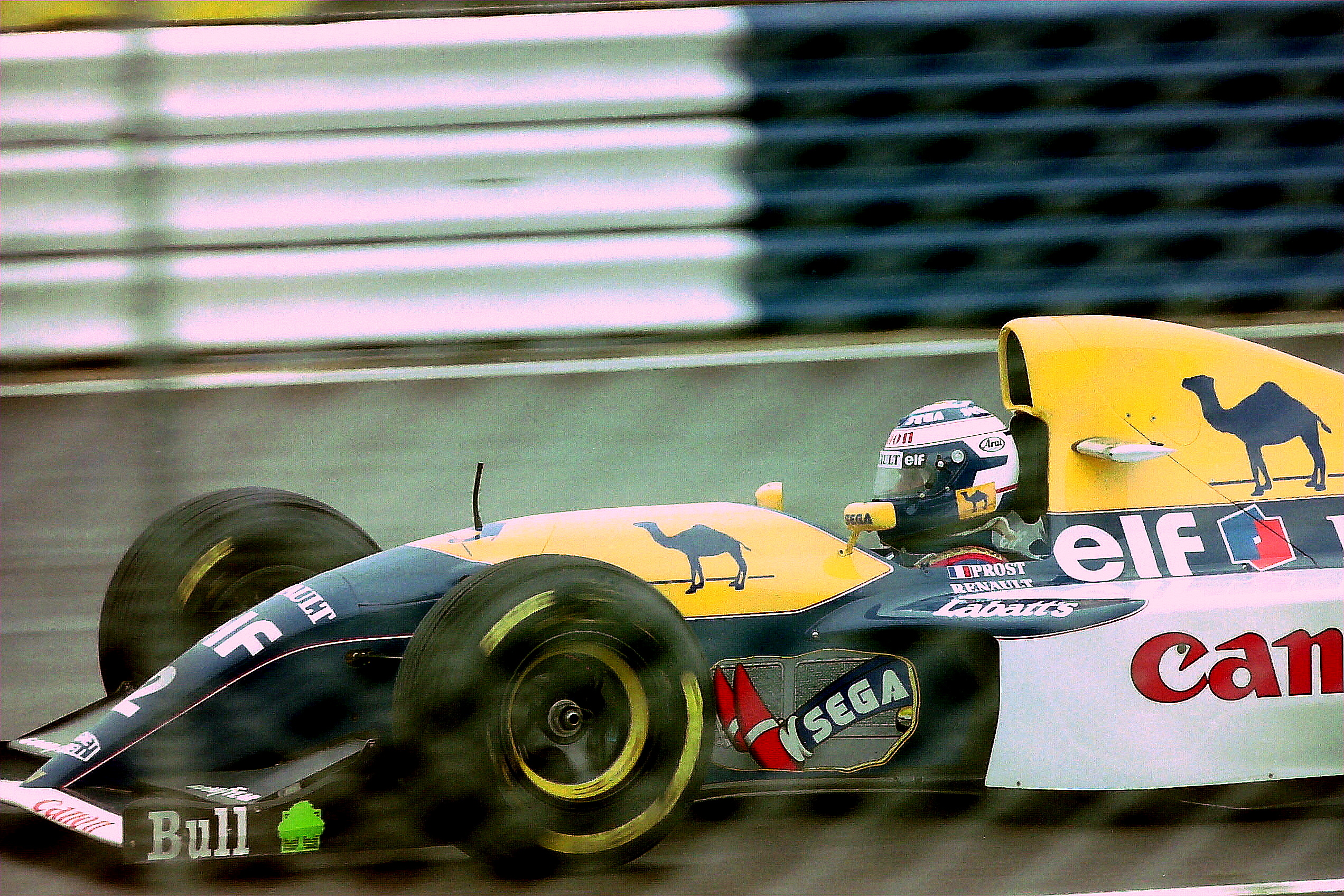
After Elf helped persuade Renault to rejoin Formula One, Alain Prost won the 1993 championship in an Elf-sponsored Williams-Renault.

After losing Senna, Guiter pivoted back to Renault, which agreed to return to Formula One as an engine supplier in 1989, the year turbochargers were banned. As before, Guiter took a close interest in the Renault engine project. To secure Renault power, Williams broke its contract with Mobil to sign with Elf. The Williams-Renault-Elf alliance won four Drivers' Championships and five Constructors' Championships in the 1990s.

Guiter retired from Elf in 1989 after reaching the mandatory retirement age of sixty. He returned to filmmaking, and produced a 1992 documentary on Senna, which was directed by his son Jean-Claude. However, he remained involved with Elf as an advisor for another seven years. He pushed Frank Williams to sign Prost for 1990, but Williams balked at Prost's high demands, and Prost went to Ferrari instead. Prost did not join Williams-Renault until 1993; the team's outgoing lead driver, 1992 champion Nigel Mansell, later claimed that Elf and Renault had tried to freeze him out to ensure Prost would be the primary focus of the team.

After Williams dominated the 1992 season, the FIA's Max Mosley attempted to "make racing more interesting for the public" by outlawing the special fuel that Elf had been supplying Williams, on the logic that Formula One should try to use the same petrol as ordinary consumers. During the 1993 season, Mosley accused Elf of violating this directive and threatened to disqualify Prost from several races, although no penalty was given. Guiter later complained that "the FIA was always trying to trap us"; Mosley had previously been accused of targeting Prost to "enliven" the competition, as Prost had by far the best car on the grid. After Prost won the title, Guiter remarked that "coming back to a problem you failed and succeeding ten years later is very rare".

=== Schumacher and Benetton ===
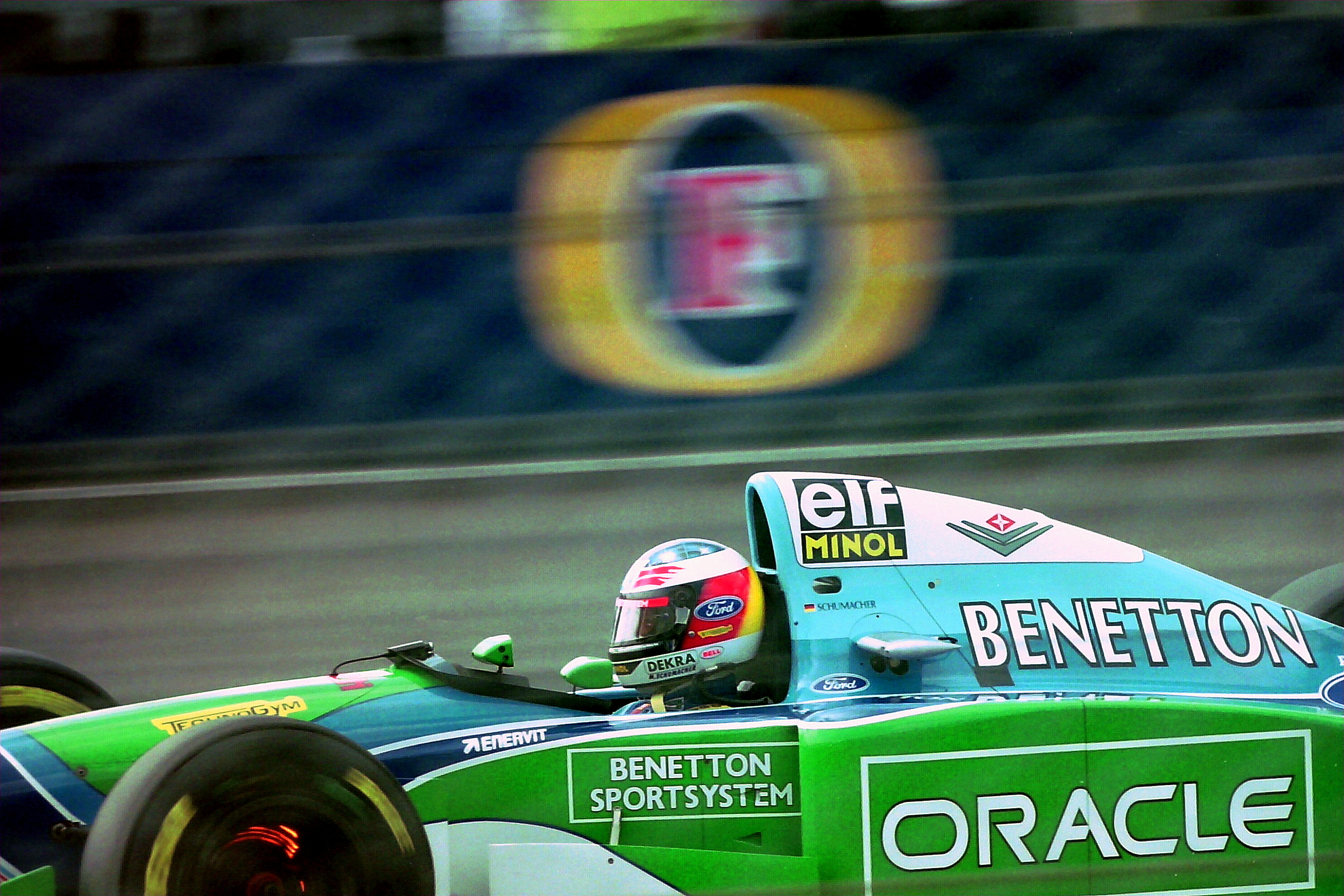
Elf also supported non-Renault teams. Michael Schumacher won the 1994 drivers' title in an Elf-sponsored Benetton-Ford.

Elf supplied fuel to at least six other teams during the Williams-dominated 1990s, including Williams' strongest competitor, Benetton Formula. Elf signed with Benetton-Ford in 1993. The following year, Benetton's Michael Schumacher won the 1994 drivers' title.

In 1995, Benetton switched to Renault power and contended for titles again. At the season-opening Brazilian Grand Prix, Schumacher and Williams' David Coulthard were temporarily disqualified due to an issue with Elf's fuel, but the FIA concluded that Elf's violation was a technicality. Even so, Max Mosley felt that some kind of penalty was necessary for the sake of "the whole system", so the teams lost their championship points while the drivers' disqualifications were reversed. Guiter commented that because Elf's fuel was not illegal, the FIA had to "reclassify Schumacher to avoid ridicule". Despite the penalty, Schumacher and Benetton-Renault won a double world championship that year.

== Exit from Formula One ==
Elf pulled out of Formula One after the 1996 season. Although the move was principally attributed to cost cuts associated with Elf's 1994 privatisation, Guiter's contemporary Mike Knight put some of the blame on Guiter, arguing that he could have done more to ensure that that his successor at Elf was also a supporter of auto racing.

Elf returned to Formula One after Renault purchased Benetton in 2000. However, by 2007, there were no French drivers on the grid. Renault switched its fuel and lubricants supplier to BP/Castrol in 2017, closing the book on a partnership spanning half a century.

== Personal life ==
Guiter and his wife Françoise (née Grandidier) had three children, named Jean-Claude, Sophie, and Florence. Françoise was a Chevalier of the Ordre des Arts et Lettres and the niece of sculptor Germaine Richier.

Guiter died on 9 November 2014 in the 15th arrondissement of Paris. He was cremated and his ashes were scattered at the cave where his brother died.

== Sources ==
- Casaert, Benoît (2020). "La Régie Renault et ELF en compétition (1955-1968): du début de la politique des partenariats aux accords de préconisation". Histoire, Économie et Société (in French). 39 (2): 86–100. doi:10.3917/hes.202.0086. ISSN 0752-5702. JSTOR 27104041.
- Collings, Timothy (2004). Jackie Stewart: A Restless Life. London: Virgin. ISBN 978-0-7535-0945-6.
- Loubet, Jean-Louis (2000). Renault: histoire d'une entreprise (in French). Boulogne-Billancourt: ETAI. ISBN 978-2-7268-8456-0.
- Ménard, Pierre (8 November 2014). "François Guiter, l'empreinte d'un géant". Classic Courses (in French).
- Prost, Alain (1990). Life in the Fast Lane. London: Stanley Paul. ISBN 978-0-09-174471-7.
- Smith, Roy (2010). Alpine & Renault: The Sports Prototypes, Volume 2: 1973-1978. United Kingdom: Veloce. ISBN 9781845842260.
- Stewart, Jackie (2007). Winning is not enough. London: Headline. ISBN 978-0-7553-1538-3.
