= Elf Aquitaine =

French petroleum brand owned by TotalEnergies

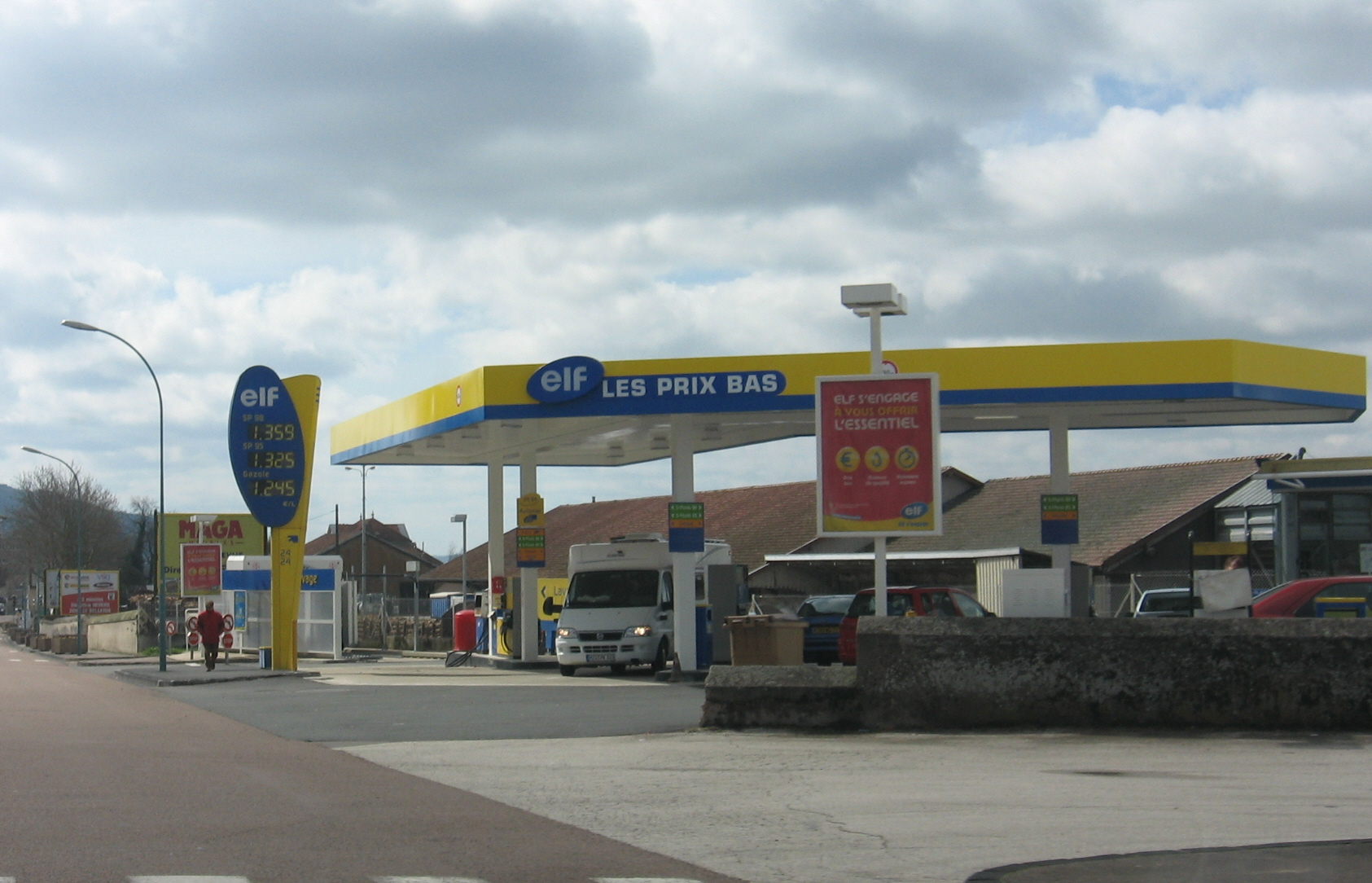
- Type: Société anonyme
- Traded as: Paris Bourse: ELF NYSE: ELF
- Industry: Petroleum
- Predecessor: Mineralöl- und Asphaltwerke
- Defunct: 2000; 26 years ago
- Fate: Merged to TotalEnergies in 2000, becoming a brand
- Successor: TotalEnergies
- Headquarters: Courbevoie, Hauts-de-Seine, Île-de-France, France
- Area served: Worldwide
- Products: Gasoline, motor oils, natural gas, brake fluids
- Parent: TotalEnergies
- Website: elf.com

Elf Aquitaine is a French brand of oils and other motor products (such as brake fluids) for automobiles and trucks. Elf is a former petroleum company which merged with TotalFina to form "TotalFinaElf". The new company changed its name to Total in 2003 and TotalEnergies in 2021. Elf has been a major brand of TotalEnergies since then.

== History ==
=== Founding and mergers (1965–1979) ===
Elf Aquitaine's heritage is rooted among three French oil companies: Régie Autonome des Pétroles (RAP), Société Nationale des Pétroles d'Aquitaine (SNPA), and Bureau de Recherches de Pétroles (BRP). These entities were formed to exploit a gas field discovered in Saint-Marcet in the Aquitaine region of south-western France in 1939.

In the early 1960s, with a view to create a French national champion with oil and gas considered as a strategic resource for economic development, under President de Gaulle's leadership, further state-owned companies were set up with specific objectives.

- Union Générale de Distribution de produits pétroliers (UGD) was established in April 1960 with the aim to regroup and manage smaller, but competing private oil and gas companies such as Avia, Caltex, Solydit, ButaFrance, ButaLacq, Lacq, La Mure and CFPP.
- To counter the influence in refining activities owned by foreign conglomorerates Shell, BP, Esso and Mobil, Union Générale des Pétroles (UGP) was born a month later, with the mission to create and operate a network of refining facilities and distribution as well as continuing in oil and gas exploration via Groupement des exploitants pétroliers (GEP).

In December 1965, RAP, SNPA and BRP were merged to form Entreprise de Recherches et d'Activités Pétrolières (ERAP), later Elf-ERAP (Essences et Lubrifiants de France). UGP eventually merged with UGD and integrated into the newly formed group. The resulting company achieved vertical integration, owning assets in all phases of the oil and gas business from exploration to production, refinery, distribution and research.

On April 28, 1967, the company's disparate brands and products were unified under the Elf brand. Elf was the first company to pioneer a completely synthetic racing oil.

In 1973, Elf diversified with subsidiary SNPA creating a pharmaceuticals subsidiary Sanofi, and acquired the pharmaceutical groups Labaz, Castaigne, and Robilliart as well as the purchase of minor interests in a cosmetics company.

In 1976, Elf-ERAP merged with Antar Pétroles de l'Atlantique to become Société Nationale Elf Aquitaine (SNEA), later Elf Aquitaine.

=== Hoax and merger (1979–1993) ===
In 1979, Elf Aquitaine lost over US$150 million in the Great Oil Sniffer Hoax to develop a new "gravity wave-based oil detection system", which was later revealed to be a scam.

In 1981, Elf Aquitaine bought Texasgulf for US $3 billion, despite a request by the US government to postpone the merger for time to study the implications. At the time, Texasgulf was the largest producer of sulphur in the world, with Elf Aquitaine gaining majority control. Texasgulf was over one-third owned by the government of Canada.

In 1991, Elf Aquitaine was listed on the NYSE.

In 1993, Elf was awarded an exclusive contract to the Iraqi oil fields by Iraqi leader Saddam Hussein.

=== Fraud scandals (1993-1996) ===
The Elf scandal which came to light in 1994 in France was according to The Guardian;

'the biggest fraud inquiry in Europe since the Second World War... Elf became a private bank for executives who spent £200 million on political favours, mistresses, jewellery, fine art, villas and apartments'.

Iraqi-born Nadhmi Auchi, at that time rumoured to be among the ten richest men in Britain, received a 15-month suspended sentence and a £1.5m fine for his involvement taking illegal commissions. Auchi was also linked to the Clearstream scandal. He is BNP Paribas bank's main private share-holder; and until 2001, the money for the Oil-for-Food programme transited through the escrow account of BNP Paribas.

Moreover, magistrate Eva Joly investigated the case. In the Leuna/Minol deal following German reunification, Elf Aquitaine took over circa 2,500 vacated gas station allottments in the former East Germany without paying the rightful owners.

=== Merger and Total S.A. (1996–2022) ===
In 1996, the French government sold its stake, retaining a golden share.

In 2000, Elf Aquitaine merged with Total Fina to form TotalFinaElf, which changed its name to Total in 2003.

Legal investigations into the company continued after it was purchased by Totalfina.

== Automobile and motorcycle partnerships ==
Elf Aquitaine is an official recommended fuel and motor oil for all Renault-Nissan-Mitsubishi Alliance marques (including Renault [shared with BP, Aral, and Castrol], Nissan, Dacia, Datsun, Alpine, Venucia, Renault Korea Motors and Infiniti) and Brough Superior for automobiles only as well as Kawasaki for motorcycles only.

== Motorsports ==
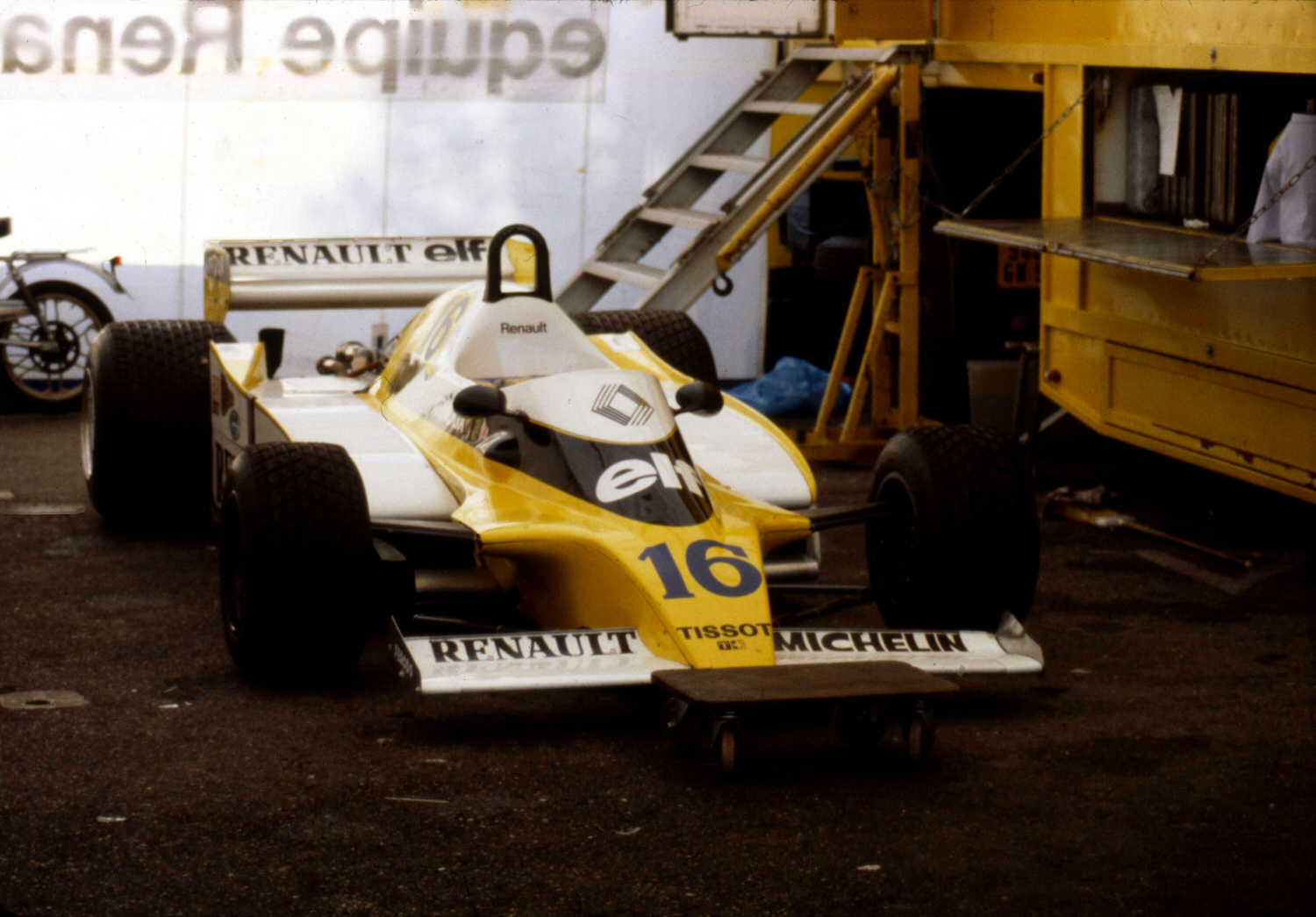
Renault RS10 Formula One car in 1979

From its very beginnings, Elf used motor racing as a means of promotion. It began with a four-year association with Matra in a French Formula Three program. This resulted in Henri Pescarolo winning the title. The European Formula Two Championship fell to Matra the following year with Jean-Pierre Beltoise. In 1969, the combination won the Formula One World Championship with Tyrrell and Jackie Stewart.

The goal of winning the Le Mans 24 Hours was not achieved until 1972, by which time Elf and Matra had gone their separate ways. Elf, at that time owned by France, then undertook a policy to rebuild and promote French motor racing. began a long-term relationship with Renault, which was also owned by the French government at the time. Renault promoted the use of Elf oils in its road cars, while its Formula One racing cars also carried Elf sponsorship. This changed in 2009, when the Renault Formula One cars replaced the Elf logos with Total logos.

The most famous of the schemes to promote young drivers dates back to the start of the 1970s, when Elf's marketing director François Guiter established what was known as the Volant Elf. The fastest drivers on each course at the Winfield Racing Schools, Magny Cours and Paul Ricard, were asked to return to the school in the autumn to establish the fastest driver of the year. The two winners were each given a full budget to race the following year in Formula Renault. If they were fast enough they would be retained by Elf in Formula Three and then Formula Two (or later Formula 3000), and eventually they would get a drive in Formula One. The first two Pilotes Elf were Patrick Tambay and Didier Pironi. Both went on to win Grands Prix.

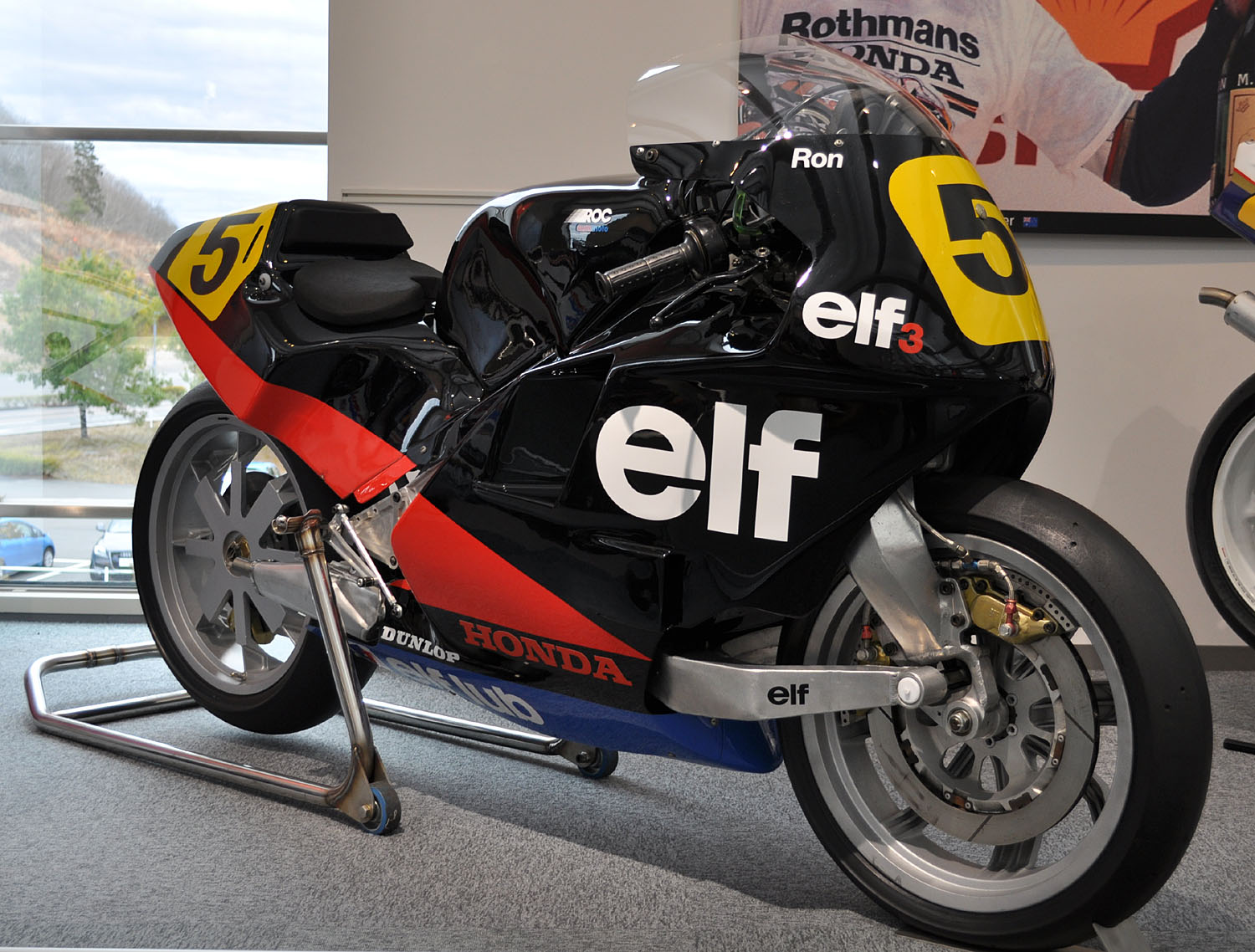
Elf Honda HRC 500 cc Grand Prix racing motorcycle of the mid-1980s

They were followed over the years by Alain Prost, Pascal Fabre, Olivier Grouillard, Paul Belmondo, Éric Bernard, Érik Comas and Olivier Panis, all of whom became Formula One drivers. In addition, Elf often picked up other good drivers and sponsored them, creating a generation of top French drivers in the 1980s and early 1990s.

When Guiter retired Elf decided to change the policy and a revised program was implemented. This aimed to create a scheme for drivers, mechanics and engineers. Called "La Filière;" it funded as many as eight drivers each year in Formula Renault Elf Campus and four in Formula Three. Budget cuts between 2008 and 2012 reduced the number of French drivers moving on to Formula One positions.

Elf also supplying fuels and lubricants for two Formula One junior feeder open-wheel single-seater formula auto racing tournaments GP2 Series (later rebranded as FIA Formula 2 Championship in 2017) since 2005 and GP3 Series since 2010 (later rebranded as FIA Formula 3 Championship in 2019) respectively due to in fact Mecachrome has a long-term technical partnership with Elf since 1969 until 2022.

Elf also supplying standard Ethanol E10 fuels for all SRO-owned GT championships. In 2023, Elf became a series sponsor of the TCR Australia series.

== See also ==
- André Tarallo – French businessman (1927–2018)
- List of largest mergers and acquisitions
- Angolagate – 1990s political scandal in France
- Roland Dumas – French lawyer and politician (1922–2024)
- Subsidiaries and affiliates of TotalEnergies – Including locations
